= List of state highways in Louisiana (850–899) =

The following is a list of state highways in the U.S. state of Louisiana designated in the 850–899 range.

== Louisiana Highway 850 ==
Louisiana Highway 850
- Location: Caldwell Parish
- Length: 8.980 mi (14.452 km)
- Existed: 1955–present

Louisiana Highway 850 (LA 850) runs 8.98 miles (14.45 km) in a north–south direction from LA 849 south of Grayson to LA 4 north of Grayson.

The entire highway is in Caldwell Parish.

Location	mi	km	Destinations	Notes
	0.000	0.000	LA 849	Southern terminus
Grayson	6.702	10.786	US 165 – Monroe, Alexandria	
Grayson	7.083	11.399	LA 126 – Holum, Rosefield, Sikes	
Pulpwood Spur	8.980	14.452	LA 4 – Columbia, Chatham	Northern terminus
1.000 mi = 1.609 km; 1.000 km = 0.621 mi

The entire route is set to be deleted and transferred to local control as part of Louisiana DOTD's "right-sizing" program.

== Louisiana Highway 851 ==
Louisiana Highway 851
- Location: Caldwell Parish
- Length: 2.574 mi (4.142 km)
- Existed: 1955–present

Louisiana Highway 851 (LA 851) runs 2.57 miles (4.14 km) in a general northwest to southeast direction from LA 126 to LA 849 southeast of Grayson.

The entire route is in Caldwell Parish.

mi	km	Destinations	Notes
0.000	0.000	LA 126 – Holum, Grayson	Western terminus
2.574	4.142	LA 849	Eastern terminus
1.000 mi = 1.609 km; 1.000 km = 0.621 mi

The entire route is set to be deleted and transferred to local control under Louisiana DOTD's "right-sizing" program.

== Louisiana Highway 852 ==
Louisiana Highway 852
- Location: Rayville
- Length: 4.988 mi (8.027 km)
- Existed: 1955–present

Louisiana Highway 852 (LA 852) runs 4.99 miles (8.03 km) in a southwest to northeast direction from US 80 in Rayville to LA 583 northeast of Rayville.

The entire highway is in Richland Parish.

Location	mi	km	Destinations	Notes
Rayville	0.000	0.000	US 80 (Harrison Street)	Western terminus
	4.961– 4.988	7.984– 8.027	LA 583	Eastern terminus
1.000 mi = 1.609 km; 1.000 km = 0.621 mi

== Louisiana Highway 853 ==
Louisiana Highway 853
- Location: Rayville
- Length: 0.8 mi (1,300 m)
- Existed: 1955–c. 1957

Louisiana Highway 853 (LA 853) ran 0.8 miles (1.3 km) in a general southwest to northeast direction from a local road southwest of Rayville to a second local road in Rayville.

The entire highway was in Richland Parish.

Location	mi	km	Destinations	Notes
	0.0	0.0	Begin state maintenance on Horn Road	Southern terminus
Rayville	0.8	1.3	End state maintenance on Ashley Avenue	Northern terminus
1.000 mi = 1.609 km; 1.000 km = 0.621 mi

== Louisiana Highway 854 ==
Louisiana Highway 854
- Location: Richland Parish
- Length: 9.418 mi (15.157 km)
- Existed: 1955–present

Louisiana Highway 854 (LA 854) runs 9.42 miles (15.16 km) in an east–west direction from LA 183 north of Holly Ridge to LA 17 north of Delhi.

The entire route is in Richland Parish.

mi	km	Destinations	Notes
0.000	0.000	LA 183 – Holly Ridge	Western terminus
9.418	15.157	LA 17 – Delhi, Epps	Eastern terminus
1.000 mi = 1.609 km; 1.000 km = 0.621 mi

== Louisiana Highway 855 ==
Louisiana Highway 855
- Location: Richland Parish
- Length: 1.782 mi (2.868 km)
- Existed: 1955–present

Louisiana Highway 855 (LA 855) runs 1.78 miles (2.86 km) in an east–west direction from the junction of two local roads to a junction with LA 17 north of Delhi.

The entire highway is in Richland Parish.

Location	mi	km	Destinations	Notes
	0.000	0.000	Begin state maintenance at junction of McGowen Road and Deerman Road	Western terminus
Warden	1.782	2.868	LA 17 – Delhi, Epps	Eastern terminus
1.000 mi = 1.609 km; 1.000 km = 0.621 mi

== Louisiana Highway 856 ==
Louisiana Highway 856
- Location: Richland Parish
- Length: 4.055 mi (6.526 km)
- Existed: 1955–present

Louisiana Highway 856 (LA 856) runs 4.06 miles (6.53 km) in an east–west direction from the concurrent US 425/LA 15 north of Mangham to a local road northeast of Mangham.

The entire highway is in Richland Parish.

Location	mi	km	Destinations	Notes
Archibald	0.000– 0.012	0.000– 0.019	US 425 / LA 15 – Rayville, Winnsboro	Western terminus
	4.055	6.526	End state maintenance	Eastern terminus
1.000 mi = 1.609 km; 1.000 km = 0.621 mi

== Louisiana Highway 857 ==
Louisiana Highway 857
- Location: Franklin Parish
- Length: 4.810 mi (7.741 km)
- Existed: 1955–present

Louisiana Highway 857 (LA 857) runs 4.81 miles (7.74 km) in a north–south direction from the concurrent US 425/LA 15 in Baskin to LA 132 northeast of Baskin.

The entire highway is in Franklin Parish.

Location	mi	km	Destinations	Notes
Baskin	0.000	0.000	US 425 / LA 15 – Winnsboro, Mangham	Southern terminus
	4.810	7.741	LA 132 – Mangham	Northern terminus
1.000 mi = 1.609 km; 1.000 km = 0.621 mi

== Louisiana Highway 858 ==
Louisiana Highway 858
- Location: Franklin Parish
- Length: 4.397 mi (7.076 km)
- Existed: 1955–present

Louisiana Highway 858 (LA 858) runs 4.40 miles (7.08 km) in an east–west direction from a local road to a junction with LA 17 north of Crowville.

The entire highway is in Franklin Parish.

Location	mi	km	Destinations	Notes
	0.000	0.000	Ray Walters Road	Western terminus
	2.656	4.274	LA 859	Southern terminus of LA 859
Bakers	4.397	7.076	LA 17 – Delhi, Winnsboro	Eastern terminus
1.000 mi = 1.609 km; 1.000 km = 0.621 mi

== Louisiana Highway 859 ==
Louisiana Highway 859
- Location: Franklin Parish
- Length: 4.192 mi (6.746 km)
- Existed: 1955–present

Louisiana Highway 859 (LA 859) runs 4.19 miles (6.74 km) in a north–south direction from LA 858 to LA 132 north of Crowville.

The entire route is in Franklin Parish.

mi	km	Destinations	Notes
0.000	0.000	LA 858	Southern terminus
4.192	6.746	LA 132	Northern terminus
1.000 mi = 1.609 km; 1.000 km = 0.621 mi

== Louisiana Highway 860 ==
Louisiana Highway 860
- Location: Franklin Parish
- Length: 3.086 mi (4.966 km)
- Existed: 1955–present

Louisiana Highway 860 (LA 860) runs 3.09 miles (4.97 km) in an east–west direction from the junction of two local roads north of Crowville, Franklin Parish to a junction with LA 577 at Warsaw Ferry, Madison Parish.

Parish	Location	mi	km	Destinations	Notes
Franklin		0.000	0.000	Begin state maintenance at junction of Union Church Road and Johnny Ford Road	Western terminus
Franklin		1.984	3.193	LA 17 – Winnsboro, Delhi	
Madison	Warsaw Ferry	3.086	4.966	LA 577	Eastern terminus
1.000 mi = 1.609 km; 1.000 km = 0.621 mi

== Louisiana Highway 861 ==
Louisiana Highway 861
- Location: Franklin Parish
- Length: 3.032 mi (4.880 km)
- Existed: 1955–present

Louisiana Highway 861 (LA 861) runs 3.03 miles (4.88 km) in an east–west direction from LA 17 to a dead end northeast of Crowville.

The entire highway is in Franklin Parish.

Location	mi	km	Destinations	Notes
Longview	0.000	0.000	LA 17 – Winnsboro, Delhi	Western terminus
	3.032	4.880	Dead end at Bayou Macon	Eastern terminus
1.000 mi = 1.609 km; 1.000 km = 0.621 mi

== Louisiana Highway 862 ==
Louisiana Highway 862
- Location: Franklin Parish
- Length: 0.997 mi (1,605 m)
- Existed: 1955–present

Louisiana Highway 862 (LA 862) runs 1.00 mile (1.61 km) in a general northwest to southeast direction from LA 610 to a local road east of Swampers.

The entire route is in Franklin Parish.

mi	km	Destinations	Notes
0.000	0.000	LA 610	Western terminus
0.997	1.605	End state maintenance	Eastern terminus
1.000 mi = 1.609 km; 1.000 km = 0.621 mi

== Louisiana Highway 863 ==
Louisiana Highway 863
- Location: Franklin Parish
- Length: 2.377 mi (3.825 km)
- Existed: 1955–present

Louisiana Highway 863 (LA 863) runs 2.38 miles (3.83 km) in an east–west direction from LA 4 to LA 578 east of Winnsboro.

The entire route is in Franklin Parish.

mi	km	Destinations	Notes
0.000	0.000	LA 4 – Winnsboro, Newellton	Western terminus
2.377	3.825	LA 578 – Crowville	Eastern terminus
1.000 mi = 1.609 km; 1.000 km = 0.621 mi

== Louisiana Highway 864 ==
Louisiana Highway 864
- Location: Winnsboro
- Length: 0.964 mi (1,551 m)
- Existed: 1955–present

Louisiana Highway 864 (LA 864) runs 0.96 miles (1.54 km) in a north–south direction along Loop Road from the concurrent US 425/LA 15 to the concurrent LA 4/LA 17 in Winnsboro.

The entire highway is in Winnsboro, Franklin Parish.

mi	km	Destinations	Notes
0.000	0.000	US 425 / LA 15 (Front Street)	Southern terminus
0.964	1.551	LA 4 / LA 17 (Main Street)	Northern terminus
1.000 mi = 1.609 km; 1.000 km = 0.621 mi

== Louisiana Highway 865 ==
Louisiana Highway 865
- Location: Franklin Parish
- Length: 7.948 mi (12.791 km)
- Existed: 1955–present

Louisiana Highway 865 (LA 865) consists of two disconnected road segments totaling 7.95 miles (12.79 km) within Franklin Parish. The southern segment extends from LA 4 south of Winnsboro to the concurrent US 425/LA 15 in Winnsboro. The northern segment extends from the concurrent LA 4/LA 17 in Winnsboro to the junction of two local roads north of Winnsboro.

The entire highway is in Franklin Parish.

Location	mi	km	Destinations	Notes
Brownell	0.000	0.000	LA 4 – Winnsboro, Columbia	Southern terminus
	3.435	5.528	LA 3201 (Riser Road)	
Winnsboro	4.193	6.748	US 425 / LA 15 (Front Street)	
Gap in LA 865; West Street continues northward under local control
Winnsboro	4.193	6.748	LA 4 / LA 17 (Main Street)	
	7.948	12.791	End state maintenance at junction of Courthouse Road and Cowart Road	Northern terminus
1.000 mi = 1.609 km; 1.000 km = 0.621 mi

== Louisiana Highway 866 ==
Louisiana Highway 866
- Location: Franklin Parish
- Length: 0.980 mi (1,577 m)
- Existed: 1955–present

Louisiana Highway 866 (LA 866) runs 0.98 miles (1.58 km) in an east–west direction from LA 3210 to a local road south of Winnsboro.

The entire highway is in Franklin Parish.

Location	mi	km	Destinations	Notes
Chase	0.000	0.000	LA 3210	Western terminus
	0.980	1.577	End state maintenance on Stuckey Lane	Eastern terminus
1.000 mi = 1.609 km; 1.000 km = 0.621 mi

== Louisiana Highway 867 ==
Louisiana Highway 867
- Location: Franklin Parish
- Length: 3.502 mi (5.636 km)
- Existed: 1955–present

Louisiana Highway 867 (LA 867) runs 3.50 miles (5.63 km) in a general east–west direction from the concurrent US 425/LA 15 south of Baskin to LA 577 east of Baskin.

The entire route is in Franklin Parish.

mi	km	Destinations	Notes
0.000– 0.012	0.000– 0.019	US 425 / LA 15 – Winnsboro, Rayville	Western terminus
1.052	1.693	LA 868	Northern terminus of LA 868
3.502	5.636	LA 577 – Baskin, Crowville	Eastern terminus
1.000 mi = 1.609 km; 1.000 km = 0.621 mi

== Louisiana Highway 868 ==
Louisiana Highway 868
- Location: Franklin Parish
- Length: 2.227 mi (3.584 km)
- Existed: 1955–present

Louisiana Highway 868 (LA 868) runs 2.23 miles (3.59 km) in a north–south direction from the concurrent US 425/LA 15 in Winnsboro to LA 867 southeast of Baskin. The route's mileposts increase from the northern end contrary to common practice.

The entire highway is in Franklin Parish.

Location	mi	km	Destinations	Notes
Winnsboro	2.227– 2.214	3.584– 3.563	US 425 / LA 15 – Winnsboro, Rayville	Southern terminus
	0.000	0.000	LA 867	Northern terminus
1.000 mi = 1.609 km; 1.000 km = 0.621 mi

== Louisiana Highway 869 ==
Louisiana Highway 869
- Location: Franklin Parish
- Length: 3.795 mi (6.107 km)
- Existed: 1955–present

Louisiana Highway 869 (LA 869) runs 3.80 miles (6.12 km) in an east–west direction, forming a loop off of LA 618 northwest of Winnsboro.

The entire route is in Franklin Parish.

mi	km	Destinations	Notes
0.000	0.000	LA 618	Western terminus
3.795	6.107	LA 618	Eastern terminus
1.000 mi = 1.609 km; 1.000 km = 0.621 mi

== Louisiana Highway 870 ==
Louisiana Highway 870
- Location: Liddieville
- Length: 0.937 mi (1,508 m)
- Existed: 1955–present

Louisiana Highway 870 (LA 870) runs 0.94 miles (1.51 km) in a north–south direction from LA 135 to a local road west of Winnsboro.

The entire highway is in Franklin Parish.

Location	mi	km	Destinations	Notes
Liddieville	0.000	0.000	LA 135 – Fort Necessity, Winnsboro	Southern terminus
	0.937	1.508	End state maintenance on Ogden Cemetery Loop	Northern terminus
1.000 mi = 1.609 km; 1.000 km = 0.621 mi

== Louisiana Highway 871 ==
Louisiana Highway 871
- Location: Franklin Parish
- Length: 3.019 mi (4.859 km)
- Existed: 1955–present

Louisiana Highway 871 (LA 871) runs 3.02 miles (4.86 km) in a north–south direction from a local road southeast of Fort Necessity to a junction with LA 562 at Fort Necessity.

The entire highway is in Franklin Parish.

Location	mi	km	Destinations	Notes
	0.000	0.000	Begin state maintenance on Sanders Road	Southern terminus
Fort Necessity	3.019	4.859	LA 562	Northern terminus
1.000 mi = 1.609 km; 1.000 km = 0.621 mi

== Louisiana Highway 872 ==
Louisiana Highway 872
- Location: Franklin Parish
- Length: 1.6 mi (2.6 km)
- Existed: 1955–1977

Louisiana Highway 872 (LA 872) ran 1.6 miles (2.6 km) in a north–south direction from the junction of two local roads to a junction with LA 871 southwest of Fort Necessity.

The entire route was in Franklin Parish.

mi	km	Destinations	Notes
0.0	0.0	Begin state maintenance at junction of local roads	Southern terminus
1.6	2.6	LA 871	Northern terminus
1.000 mi = 1.609 km; 1.000 km = 0.621 mi

== Louisiana Highway 873 ==
Louisiana Highway 873
- Location: Extension
- Length: 1.274 mi (2.050 km)
- Existed: 1955–present

Louisiana Highway 873 (LA 873) runs 1.27 miles (2.04 km) in an east–west direction from the junction of two local roads west of Extension to LA 562 at Extension. The route's mileposts increase from the eastern end contrary to common practice.

The entire highway is in Franklin Parish.

Location	mi	km	Destinations	Notes
	1.274	2.050	Begin state maintenance at junction of Homestead Lane and John Dailey Road	Western terminus
Extension	0.000	0.000	LA 562	Eastern terminus
1.000 mi = 1.609 km; 1.000 km = 0.621 mi

== Louisiana Highway 874 ==
Louisiana Highway 874
- Location: Franklin Parish
- Length: 3.012 mi (4.847 km)
- Existed: 1955–present

Louisiana Highway 874 (LA 874) runs 3.01 miles (4.84 km) in a north–south direction from the junction of two local roads south of Jigger to LA 128 at Jigger. The route's mileposts increase from the northern end contrary to common practice.

The entire highway is in Franklin Parish.

Location	mi	km	Destinations	Notes
	3.012	4.847	Begin state maintenance at junction of Jigger Point Road and Slick Williams Road	Southern terminus
Jigger	0.000	0.000	LA 128 – Gilbert, Fort Necessity	Northern terminus
1.000 mi = 1.609 km; 1.000 km = 0.621 mi

== Louisiana Highway 875 ==
Louisiana Highway 875
- Location: Franklin Parish
- Length: 9.189 mi (14.788 km)
- Existed: 1955–present

Louisiana Highway 875 (LA 875) runs 9.19 miles (14.79 km) in a loop from LA 562 southwest of Wisner to the concurrent US 425/LA 15 north of Wisner.

The entire highway is in Franklin Parish.

Location	mi	km	Destinations	Notes
Metropolis	0.000	0.000	LA 562	Southern terminus
	0.537	0.864	LA 876	Southern terminus of LA 876
	6.491	10.446	LA 876	
	9.176– 9.189	14.767– 14.788	US 425 / LA 15 – Wisner, Gilbert	Northern terminus
1.000 mi = 1.609 km; 1.000 km = 0.621 mi

== Louisiana Highway 876 ==
Louisiana Highway 876
- Location: Franklin Parish
- Length: 5.118 mi (8.237 km)
- Existed: 1955–present

Louisiana Highway 876 (LA 876) runs 5.12 miles (8.24 km) in a north–south direction from LA 875 west of Wisner to LA 128 west of Gilbert.

The entire route is in Franklin Parish.

mi	km	Destinations	Notes
0.000	0.000	LA 875	Southern terminus
2.507	4.035	LA 875	
5.118	8.237	LA 128 – Gilbert, Fort Necessity	Northern terminus
1.000 mi = 1.609 km; 1.000 km = 0.621 mi

== Louisiana Highway 877 ==
Louisiana Highway 877
- Location: East Carroll Parish
- Length: 14.293 mi (23.002 km)
- Existed: 1955–present

Louisiana Highway 877 (LA 877) runs 14.29 miles (23.00 km) in a southwest to northeast direction from LA 17 south of Epps, West Carroll Parish to LA 134 southwest of Lake Providence, East Carroll Parish.

Parish	Location	mi	km	Destinations	Notes
Richland–West Carroll parish line	Mitchiner	0.000	0.000	LA 17 – Epps, Delhi	Western terminus
West Carroll	No major junctions				
East Carroll		3.939	6.339	LA 577 south – Waverly	West end of LA 577 concurrency
East Carroll		5.569– 5.732	8.962– 9.225	LA 579 south	Northern terminus of LA 579
East Carroll	Monticello	6.119	9.848	LA 577 north	East end of LA 577 concurrency
East Carroll		10.367	16.684	LA 580	
East Carroll		14.293	23.002	LA 134 – Epps, Lake Providence	Eastern terminus
1.000 mi = 1.609 km; 1.000 km = 0.621 mi: Concurrency terminus

== Louisiana Highway 878 ==
Louisiana Highway 878
- Location: West Carroll Parish
- Length: 3.350 mi (5.391 km)
- Existed: 1955–present

Louisiana Highway 878 (LA 878) runs 3.35 miles (5.39 km) in a north–south direction from LA 2 to the junction of LA 585 and LA 587 west of Oak Grove.

The entire route is in West Carroll Parish.

mi	km	Destinations	Notes
0.000	0.000	LA 2 – Oak Grove, Mer Rouge	Southern terminus
3.350	5.391	LA 585 / LA 587 – Oak Grove, Goodwill	Northern terminus
1.000 mi = 1.609 km; 1.000 km = 0.621 mi

== Louisiana Highway 879 ==
Louisiana Highway 879
- Location: West Carroll Parish
- Length: 5.681 mi (9.143 km)
- Existed: 1955–present

Louisiana Highway 879 (LA 879) runs 5.68 miles (9.14 km) in an east–west direction from LA 585 at Fiske to LA 2 in Oak Grove. The route's mileposts increase from the eastern end contrary to common practice.

The entire highway is in West Carroll Parish.

Location	mi	km	Destinations	Notes
Fiske	5.681	9.143	LA 585	Western terminus
Oak Grove	0.000	0.000	LA 2 (West Main Street)	Eastern terminus
1.000 mi = 1.609 km; 1.000 km = 0.621 mi

== Louisiana Highway 880 ==
Louisiana Highway 880
- Location: Kilbourne
- Length: 2.490 mi (4.007 km)
- Existed: 1955–present

Louisiana Highway 880 (LA 880) runs 2.49 miles (4.01 km) in a southwest to northeast direction from LA 17 south of Kilbourne to LA 585 east of Kilbourne.

The entire route is in West Carroll Parish.

mi	km	Destinations	Notes
0.000	0.000	LA 17 – Kilbourne, Oak Grove	Southwestern terminus
2.490	4.007	LA 585	Northeastern terminus
1.000 mi = 1.609 km; 1.000 km = 0.621 mi

== Louisiana Highway 881 ==
Louisiana Highway 881
- Location: East Carroll Parish
- Length: 5.744 mi (9.244 km)
- Existed: 1955–present

Louisiana Highway 881 (LA 881) runs 5.74 miles (9.24 km) in an east–west direction from LA 134 to LA 581 west of Transylvania.

The entire route is in East Carroll Parish.

mi	km	Destinations	Notes
0.000	0.000	LA 134 – Lake Providence, Epps	Western terminus
5.744	9.244	LA 581	Eastern terminus
1.000 mi = 1.609 km; 1.000 km = 0.621 mi

== Louisiana Highway 882 ==
Louisiana Highway 882
- Location: East Carroll Parish
- Existed: 1955–2022

Louisiana Highway 882 (LA 882) runs 7.92 miles (12.75 km) in a general north–south direction, forming a loop off of LA 134 southwest of Lake Providence. The route's mileposts increase from the northern end contrary to common practice. By 2022, the route was removed from the state highway system and transferred to local control.

The entire route is in East Carroll Parish.

mi	km	Destinations	Notes
7.922	12.749	LA 134 – Lake Providence, Epps	Southern terminus
0.000	0.000	LA 134 – Lake Providence, Epps	Southern terminus
1.000 mi = 1.609 km; 1.000 km = 0.621 mi

== Louisiana Highway 883 ==
Louisiana Highway 883
- Location: Lake Providence
- Length: 2.336 mi (3.759 km)
- Existed: 1955–present

Louisiana Highway 883 (LA 883) consists of two road segments with a total length of 2.34 miles (3.77 km) that are located in the East Carroll Parish town of Lake Providence.

- LA 883-1 runs 1.77 miles (2.85 km) along 4th Street from LA 134 (Tensas Bayou Road) to US 65 (one-way pair of Scarborough and Sparrow Streets).
- LA 883-2 runs 0.57 miles (0.92 km) along Charles D. Jones Boulevard (formerly Gould Boulevard) from LA 883-1 (4th Street) to US 65 (Lake Street).

== Louisiana Highway 884 ==
Louisiana Highway 884
- Location: Madison Parish
- Length: 11.9 mi (19.2 km)
- Existed: 1955–c. 1957

Louisiana Highway 884 (LA 884) ran 11.9 miles (19.2 km) in a southwest to northeast direction from a dead end at the Tensas River to a junction with US 65 south of Tallulah.

The entire route was in Madison Parish.

mi	km	Destinations	Notes
0.0	0.0	Dead end at Tensas River	Western terminus
11.9	19.2	US 65 – Tallulah, Newellton	Eastern terminus
1.000 mi = 1.609 km; 1.000 km = 0.621 mi

== Louisiana Highway 885 ==
Louisiana Highway 885
- Location: Tensas Parish
- Length: 1.6 mi (2.6 km)
- Existed: 1955–1977

Louisiana Highway 885 (LA 885) ran 1.6 miles (2.6 km) in an east–west direction from LA 603 east of Afton, Madison Parish to a dead end alongside Bayou Vidal in Tensas Parish.

Parish	Location	mi	km	Destinations	Notes
Madison		0.0	0.0	LA 603	Western terminus
Tensas		1.6	2.6	Dead end alongside Bayou Vidal	Eastern terminus
1.000 mi = 1.609 km; 1.000 km = 0.621 mi

== Louisiana Highway 886 ==
Louisiana Highway 886
- Location: Tensas Parish
- Length: 4.2 mi (6.8 km)
- Existed: 1955–c. 1957

Louisiana Highway 886 (LA 886) ran 4.2 miles (6.8 km) in an east–west direction from LA 605 north of Newellton to LA 608 northeast of Newellton.

The entire route was in Tensas Parish.

mi	km	Destinations	Notes
0.0	0.0	LA 605	Western terminus
4.2	6.8	LA 608	Eastern terminus
1.000 mi = 1.609 km; 1.000 km = 0.621 mi

== Louisiana Highway 887 ==
Louisiana Highway 887
- Location: Newellton
- Length: 1.014 mi (1.632 km)
- Existed: 1955–present

Louisiana Highway 887 (LA 887) runs 1.01 miles (1.63 km) in an east–west direction, primarily along Hillcrest Drive, from LA 605 in Newellton to LA 608 east of Newellton.

The entire highway is in Tensas Parish.

Location	mi	km	Destinations	Notes
Newellton	0.000	0.000	LA 605 (Main Street)	Western terminus
	1.014	1.632	LA 608	Eastern terminus
1.000 mi = 1.609 km; 1.000 km = 0.621 mi

== Louisiana Highway 888 ==
Louisiana Highway 888
- Location: Tensas Parish
- Length: 19.831 mi (31.915 km)
- Existed: 1955–present

Louisiana Highway 888 (LA 888) runs 19.83 miles (31.91 km) in a general east–west direction from LA 4 west of Newellton to LA 605 north of Newellton.

The route initially heads northward from LA 4, roughly following the east bank of the Tensas River. Upon reaching a point known as Tensas Bluff, LA 888 turns eastward, makes a long curves to the north, then curves eastward again along the river. East of Westwood, LA 888 begins a brief concurrency with LA 575. The highway then makes a turn to the southeast while LA 575 continues due east. 3.9 miles (6.3 km) later, it intersects US 65. LA 888 proceeds a short distance to its end at LA 605 on Lake St. Joseph at Balmoral. It is an undivided two-lane highway for its entire length.

The entire highway is in Tensas Parish.

Location	mi	km	Destinations	Notes
	0.000	0.000	LA 4 – Newellton, Winnsboro	Western terminus
Westwood	11.253	18.110	LA 1079	Southern terminus of LA 1079
	12.668	20.387	LA 575 south	West end of LA 575 concurrency
	14.409	23.189	LA 575 east	East end of LA 575 concurrency
	18.328	29.496	US 65 – Tallulah, Newellton	
Balmoral	19.831	31.915	LA 605	Eastern terminus
1.000 mi = 1.609 km; 1.000 km = 0.621 mi: Concurrency terminus

== Louisiana Highway 889 ==
Louisiana Highway 889
- Location: Tensas Parish
- Length: 1.5 mi (2.4 km)
- Existed: 1955–1960s

Louisiana Highway 889 (LA 889) ran 1.5 miles (2.4 km) in an east–west direction from a local road to a junction with LA 4 west of Newellton.

The entire route was in Tensas Parish.

mi	km	Destinations	Notes
0.0	0.0	Begin state maintenance	Western terminus
1.5	2.4	LA 4 – Newellton, Winnsboro	Eastern terminus
1.000 mi = 1.609 km; 1.000 km = 0.621 mi

== Louisiana Highway 890 ==
Louisiana Highway 890
- Location: Tensas Parish
- Length: 3.2 mi (5.1 km)
- Existed: 1955–1990

Louisiana Highway 890 (LA 890) ran 3.2 miles (5.1 km) in a north–south direction from a local road southwest of Newellton to a junction with LA 4 west of Newellton.

The entire route was in Tensas Parish.

mi	km	Destinations	Notes
0.0	0.0	Begin state maintenance	Southern terminus
3.2	5.1	LA 4 – Newellton, Winnsboro	Northern terminus
1.000 mi = 1.609 km; 1.000 km = 0.621 mi

== Louisiana Highway 891 ==
Louisiana Highway 891
- Location: Tensas Parish
- Length: 2.0 mi (3.2 km)
- Existed: 1955–1960

Louisiana Highway 891 (LA 891) ran 2.0 miles (3.2 km) in an east–west direction from a local road west of Crimea to a junction with LA 128 at Crimea.

The entire highway was in Tensas Parish.

Location	mi	km	Destinations	Notes
	0.0	0.0	Begin state maintenance	Western terminus
Crimea	2.0	3.2	LA 128 – St. Joseph, Winnsboro	Eastern terminus
1.000 mi = 1.609 km; 1.000 km = 0.621 mi

== Louisiana Highway 892 ==
Louisiana Highway 892
- Location: Tensas Parish
- Length: 6.547 mi (10.536 km)
- Existed: 1955–present

Louisiana Highway 892 (LA 892) runs 6.55 miles (10.54 km) in a northwest to southeast direction from LA 573 to LA 568 west of St. Joseph.

The entire highway is in Tensas Parish.

Location	mi	km	Destinations	Notes
Ashland	0.000	0.000	LA 573	Western terminus
Mayflower	1.299	2.091	LA 3252 (Sundown Road)	Eastern terminus of LA 3252
Delta Bridge	3.006	4.838	LA 3024	Northern terminus of LA 3024
Wilsonia	6.514– 6.547	10.483– 10.536	LA 568	Eastern terminus
1.000 mi = 1.609 km; 1.000 km = 0.621 mi

== Louisiana Highway 893 ==
Louisiana Highway 893
- Location: Tensas Parish
- Length: 1.6 mi (2.6 km)
- Existed: 1955–c. 1957

Louisiana Highway 893 (LA 893) ran 1.6 miles (2.6 km) in an east–west direction from a dead end at the Tensas River to a junction with LA 573 at Cooter Point.

The entire highway was in Tensas Parish.

Location	mi	km	Destinations	Notes
	0.0	0.0	Dead end at Tensas River	Western terminus
Cooter Point	1.6	2.6	LA 573	Eastern terminus
1.000 mi = 1.609 km; 1.000 km = 0.621 mi

== Louisiana Highway 894 ==
Louisiana Highway 894
- Location: Tensas Parish
- Length: 3.0 mi (4.8 km)
- Existed: 1955–c. 1957

Louisiana Highway 894 (LA 894) ran 3.0 miles (4.8 km) in a southeast to northwest direction from LA 571 to a local road northwest of Waterproof.

The entire route was in Tensas Parish.

mi	km	Destinations	Notes
0.0	0.0	LA 571	Southern terminus
3.0	4.8	End state maintenance	Northern terminus
1.000 mi = 1.609 km; 1.000 km = 0.621 mi

== Louisiana Highway 895 ==
Louisiana Highway 895
- Location: Tensas Parish
- Length: 1.1 mi (1.8 km)
- Existed: 1955–c. 1957

Louisiana Highway 895 (LA 895) ran 1.1 miles (1.8 km) in a southwest to northeast direction from US 65 (now LA 568) north of Waterproof to a dead end alongside the Mississippi River levee.

The entire highway was in Tensas Parish.

Location	mi	km	Destinations	Notes
Hedgeland	0.0	0.0	US 65 – Waterproof, St. Joseph	Southern terminus
	1.1	1.8	Dead end alongside Mississippi River levee	Northern terminus
1.000 mi = 1.609 km; 1.000 km = 0.621 mi

== Louisiana Highway 896 ==
Louisiana Highway 896
- Location: Tensas Parish
- Length: 0.781 mi (1,257 m)
- Existed: 1955–present

Louisiana Highway 896 (LA 896) runs 0.78 miles (1.26 km) in a general north–south direction from US 65 to LA 568 north of Waterproof. The route's mileposts increase from the northern end contrary to common practice.

The entire route is in Tensas Parish.

mi	km	Destinations	Notes
0.781	1.257	US 65 – Waterproof, St. Joseph	Southern terminus
0.000	0.000	LA 568	Northern terminus
1.000 mi = 1.609 km; 1.000 km = 0.621 mi

== Louisiana Highway 897 ==
Louisiana Highway 897
- Location: St. Joseph
- Length: 3.650 mi (5.874 km)
- Existed: 1955–present

Louisiana Highway 897 (LA 897) consists of six road segments with a total length of 3.65 miles (5.87 km) that are located in the Tensas Parish town of St. Joseph.

- LA 897-1 runs 1.63 miles (2.62 km) along Levee Road from a point south of the corporate limits, continuing onto Front Street within the town, and turning onto Plank Road to the junction of LA 128 and LA 605 at Newton Road.
- LA 897-2 runs 0.35 miles (0.56 km) along 4th Street from the junction of LA 897-3 and LA 897-6 at Hancock Street to LA 128 (Plank Road).
- LA 897-3 runs 0.28 miles (0.45 km) along Hancock Street from the junction of LA 897-2 and LA 897-6 at 4th Street to LA 897-1 (Front Street).
- LA 897-4 runs 0.13 miles (0.21 km) along Washington Street from LA 897-5 (2nd Street) to LA 897-1 (Front Street).
- LA 897-5 runs 0.05 miles (0.080 km) along 2nd Street from LA 897-4 (Washington Street) to LA 897-3 (Hancock Street).
- LA 897-6 runs 1.21 miles (1.95 km) along 12th, Beech, 7th, and Hancock Streets from LA 128 (Plank Road) to the junction of LA 897-2 and LA 897-3 at 4th Street.

== Louisiana Highway 898 ==
Louisiana Highway 898
- Location: Somerset
- Length: 0.332 mi (534 m)
- Existed: 1955–present

Louisiana Highway 898 (LA 898) runs 0.61 miles (0.98 km) in a north–south direction, forming a loop off of US 65 at Somerset. Though signed in the field, the concurrency with LA 575 at its southern end is not counted in the official route mileage, resulting in a shorter figure of 0.33 miles (0.53 km).

The entire highway is in Somerset, Tensas Parish.

mi	km	Destinations	Notes
		US 65 – Newellton, Tallulah LA 575 ends	Southern terminus of LA 898; northern terminus of LA 575; south end of LA 575 concurrency
0.278-mile (0.447 km) concurrency with LA 575 not counted in route mileage
0.000	0.000	LA 575 south	North end of LA 575 concurrency
0.332	0.534	US 65 – Newellton, Tallulah	Northern terminus
1.000 mi = 1.609 km; 1.000 km = 0.621 mi: Concurrency terminus

== Louisiana Highway 899 ==
Louisiana Highway 899
- Location: Concordia Parish
- Length: 2.5 mi (4.0 km)
- Existed: 1955–c. 1957

Louisiana Highway 899 (LA 899) ran 2.5 miles (4.0 km) in an east–west direction from LA 566 to US 65 north of Clayton.

The entire route was in Concordia Parish.

mi	km	Destinations	Notes
0.0	0.0	LA 566	Western terminus
2.5	4.0	US 65 – Ferriday, Waterproof	Northern terminus
1.000 mi = 1.609 km; 1.000 km = 0.621 mi
