= Louisiana Highway 15 =

State highway in Louisiana, United States

Louisiana Highway 15

- Route of LA 15 highlighted in red

Route information
- Maintained by Louisiana DOTD
- Length: 194.102 mi (312.377 km)
- Existed: 1955 renumbering–present
- Tourist routes: National Scenic Byway: Great River Road

Major junctions
- South end: LA 1 / LA 970 in Lettsworth
- US 84 / US 425 in Ferriday; US 65 in Clayton; LA 8 in Sicily Island; LA 4 / LA 17 in Winnsboro; US 425 north of Mangham; I-20 / US 80 / US 165 in Monroe; LA 34 in West Monroe; LA 2 / LA 33 in Farmerville
- North end: US 63 / US 167 in Lillie

Location
- Country: United States
- State: Louisiana
- Parishes: Pointe Coupee, West Feliciana, Concordia, Catahoula, Franklin, Richland, Ouachita, Union

Highway system
- Louisiana State Highway System; Interstate; US; State; Scenic
← LA 14	→ LA 16

Louisiana Highway 15 (LA 15) is a state highway located in central and northern Louisiana. It runs 194.10 miles (312.37 km) in a north–south direction from the junction of LA 1 and LA 970 in Lettsworth to the concurrent U.S. Highways 63 and 167 in Lillie. The middle portion of the route, extending 56 miles (90 km) from Ferriday to just north of Mangham, is co-signed with US 425 and is a major four-lane highway through the area.

== Route description ==
LA 15 begins at a junction with LA 1 in Pointe Coupee Parish. The highway heads north and crosses several bridges spanning various channels of the Old River Control Structure. LA 15 parallels the Mississippi River through a remote rural section of Concordia Parish before reaching junctions with US 84 and US 425 in Ferriday.

Beginning in Ferriday, LA 15 is co-signed with US 425 and becomes a major four-lane through route. The highway passes through the communities of Clayton, Sicily Island, Wisner, and Gilbert before entering the city of Winnsboro. Here, US 425 and LA 15 make connections with LA 4 and LA 17.

Continuing northward, the highway travels through Baskin and Mangham. Just beyond Mangham, at a point known as Archibald, LA 15 turns northwest off of US 425 and proceeds into Monroe, one of northern Louisiana's two metropolitan areas. The route crosses mainline US 165 on the way into town then overlaps US 165 Bus. into the downtown area. During this stretch, LA 15 has a diamond interchange with I-20 and passes the Monroe Civic Center.

In Downtown Monroe, LA 15 turns west and runs concurrent with US 80 across the Ouachita River and into the neighboring city of West Monroe. Just beyond the Lea Joyner Bridge, US 80 and LA 15 intersect LA 34 then zigzag through town, intersecting several major thoroughfares that provide access to the parallel I-20. West of the city limits, LA 15 turns off of US 80 and heads northwest to Farmerville, situated on Lake D'Arbonne.

LA 15 overlaps both LA 33 and LA 2 in Farmerville. The route continues through rural Union Parish until reaching its terminus at US 63/US 167 at Lillie, just west of Spearsville.

== History ==
Much of the present route of LA 15 originated as State Route 15 prior to the 1955 Louisiana Highway renumbering. It was one of the few state highways whose number was carried over into the new system. Differences from the modern route include bypassed portions such as Old Highway 15, Louisiana Highway 3210, and various country roads. The highway south of Vidalia and into Pointe Coupee Parish was not part of LA 15 until the 1960s, after the renumbering. There is also a section of the Great River Road in Plaquemines Parish that is called Highway 15.

Beginning at Farmersville, through Monroe, Rhymes Store, Alta, R.S. Baughton's Store, Mangham, Winnsboro, Sicily Island, Clayton, to a point on Route 3.

— 1921 Louisiana Legislative Route Description

== Major intersections ==
Parish	Location	mi	km	Destinations	Notes
Pointe Coupee	Lettsworth	0.000	0.000	LA 1 – Simmesport, New Roads LA 970 south	Southern terminus; southern end of LA 970 concurrency; location also known as Keller
Pointe Coupee		2.653	4.270	LA 970 north	Northern end of LA 970 concurrency; to Pointe Coupee Parish Port
Pointe Coupee	Torras	4.907	7.897	LA 418	To Pointe Coupee Parish Port
Pointe Coupee		5.913– 6.081	9.516– 9.786	Bridge over Old River Lock	
West Feliciana	No major junctions				
Concordia		14.232– 17.063	22.904– 27.460	Three bridges over Old River Control Structure channels	
Concordia	Shaw	24.665	39.694	LA 910 (Dora Knapp Road)	Eastern terminus of LA 910
Concordia	Deer Park	42.243	67.984	LA 565 – Monterey	Southeastern terminus of LA 565
Concordia	St. Genevieve	51.109	82.252	LA 131 – Vidalia	Southern terminus of LA 131
Concordia		57.962	93.281	LA 3232	Western terminus of LA 3232
Concordia	Ferriday	59.110– 59.132	95.128– 95.164	US 84 west (Louisiana Avenue) – Jonesville	Southern end of US 84 concurrency
Concordia	Ferriday	59.613	95.938	US 84 east / US 425 south (E.E. Wallace Boulevard) – Vidalia, Natchez; LA 568 (Louisiana Avenue)	Northern end of US 84 concurrency; southern end of US 425 concurrency; southern terminus of LA 568
Concordia	Ferriday	59.946	96.474	LA 903 (Kentucky Avenue)	Eastern terminus of LA 903
Concordia	Clayton	65.617– 65.752	105.600– 105.818	US 65 north – Newellton, Tallulah	Southern terminus of US 65
Concordia	Clayton	66.229	106.585	LA 566 (McAdams Road, River Drive)	
Concordia–Catahoula parish line	Clayton	66.299– 66.437	106.698– 106.920	Bridge over Tensas River	
Catahoula	Lee Bayou	69.494	111.840	LA 567	Eastern terminus of LA 567
Catahoula	Foules	74.216	119.439	LA 921	
Catahoula	Sicily Island	78.465	126.277	LA 8 west (Newman Avenue) – Harrisonburg, Jena	Eastern terminus of LA 8
Catahoula	Peck	83.793	134.852	LA 913	Northern terminus of LA 913
Catahoula		85.518	137.628	LA 3148 (Norris Hill Road)	Western terminus of LA 3148
Franklin	Wisner	87.839	141.363	LA 562 west (Oak Street)	Southern end of LA 562 concurrency
Franklin	Wisner	88.140	141.848	LA 562 east	Northern end of LA 562 concurrency
Franklin		89.113	143.413	LA 875	Northern terminus of LA 875
Franklin	Gilbert	92.471	148.818	LA 128 west (Gill Street)	Southern end of LA 128 concurrency
Franklin	Gilbert	92.626	149.067	LA 572	Western terminus of LA 572
Franklin	Gilbert	93.046	149.743	LA 128 east (Lee Street)	Northern end of LA 128 concurrency
Franklin	Chase	96.212	154.838	LA 3210	Southern terminus of LA 3210
Franklin	Chase	97.878	157.519	LA 3210	Northern terminus of LA 3210
Franklin	Winnsboro	100.451	161.660	LA 3201	Eastern terminus of LA 3201
Franklin	Winnsboro	100.787	162.201	LA 864 (Loop Road)	Southern terminus of LA 864
Franklin	Winnsboro	101.480	163.316	LA 865 (West Street)	Northern terminus of LA 865 (southern segment)
Franklin	Winnsboro	102.009	164.168	LA 4 west (Prairie Road) – Columbia	Southern end of LA 4 concurrency
Franklin	Winnsboro	102.290– 102.333	164.620– 164.689	LA 4 east / LA 17 north (Kinloch Street) – Delhi LA 130 west (Taylor Avenue) – Liddieville	Northern end of LA 4 concurrency; southern terminus of LA 17; eastern terminus of LA 130
Franklin	Winnsboro	104.913	168.841	LA 868	Southern terminus of LA 868
Franklin		107.154	172.448	LA 867	Western terminus of LA 867
Franklin	Baskin	107.944	173.719	LA 577 – Crowville	Western terminus of LA 577
Franklin	Baskin	108.786	175.074	LA 857	Southern terminus of LA 857
Richland	Mangham	112.841	181.600	LA 132 west (Main Street)	Southern end of LA 132 concurrency
Richland	Mangham	113.568	182.770	LA 132	Northern end of LA 132 concurrency
Richland	Archibald	115.603	186.045	LA 856	Western terminus of LA 856
Richland	Archibald	115.888– 115.976	186.504– 186.645	US 425 north / LA 137 north to I-20 – Rayville	Northern end of US 425 concurrency; southern terminus of LA 137
Richland	Alto	120.792– 120.927	194.396– 194.613	LA 135 south	Southern end of LA 135 concurrency
Richland		121.574	195.654	LA 135 north – Rayville	Northern end of LA 135 concurrency
Richland		122.860– 122.954	197.724– 197.875	Bridge over Boeuf River	
Richland	Rhymes	124.044	199.629	LA 133 – Start, Columbia	
Ouachita	Pine Grove	135.155	217.511	LA 841 (Prairie Road)	Northern terminus of LA 841
Ouachita	Monroe	137.892– 137.910	221.916– 221.945	US 165 (Martin Luther King Jr. Drive) to I-20 – ULM, Columbia	
Ouachita	Monroe	139.899	225.146	LA 594 (Texas Avenue)	Southwestern terminus of LA 594
Ouachita	Monroe	140.062	225.408	US 165 Bus. south (Ouachita Avenue) To I-20 via South 3rd Street	Southern end of US 165 Bus. concurrency
Ouachita	Monroe	140.332– 140.485	225.842– 226.089	I-20 – Vicksburg, Shreveport	Exit 117C on I-20 (eastbound exit via 116B)
Ouachita	Monroe	141.303	227.405	US 80 east / US 165 Bus. north (Louisville Avenue)	Northern end of US 165 Bus. concurrency; southern end of US 80 concurrency
Ouachita	Monroe–West Monroe line	141.732– 141.959	228.096– 228.461	Lea Joyner Bridge over Ouachita River	
Ouachita	West Monroe	142.077	228.651	LA 34 south (Bridge Street) to I-20	Eastern terminus of LA 34
Ouachita	West Monroe	143.694– 143.701	231.253– 231.264	LA 143 (North 7th Street)	
Ouachita	West Monroe	144.258	232.161	LA 617 south (Thomas Road) to I-20	Southern end of LA 617 concurrency
Ouachita	West Monroe	144.519	232.581	LA 617 north (Warren Drive)	Northern end of LA 617 concurrency
Ouachita	West Monroe	145.332	233.889	To I-20 via Downing Pines Road	
Ouachita		146.390	235.592	LA 3249 (Well Road) to I-20	Northern terminus of LA 3249
Ouachita	Cheniere	149.642	240.825	US 80 west (Cypress Street) – Ruston LA 546 south (Cheniere Drew Road) to I-20 – Eros	Northern end of US 80 concurrency; northern terminus of LA 546
Ouachita	Drew	151.603	243.981	LA 616 (Ole Highway 15)	Western terminus of LA 616
Union		156.608	252.036	LA 552 – Wilhite, Point	Southern terminus of LA 552
Union	Terrills	163.065	262.428	LA 145 south – Downsville, Choudrant	Northern terminus of LA 145
Union	Terrills	163.328	262.851	LA 552 – Point, Wilhite	Northern terminus of LA 552
Union		170.199– 170.227	273.909– 273.954	LA 33 south – Ruston	Southern end of LA 33 concurrency
Union	Farmerville	171.445– 171.631	275.914– 276.213	James Peyton Smith Bridge over Lake D'Arbonne	
Union	Farmerville	172.762	278.033	LA 3281 (Park Street)	Eastern terminus of LA 3281; to National Guard Armory
Union	Farmerville	172.870	278.207	LA 2 east (East Water Street) – Sterlington, Bastrop	Southern end of LA 2 concurrency
Union	Farmerville	173.341	278.965	LA 33 north (Miller Street) – Marion	Northern end of LA 33 concurrency; to Farmerville Stadium
Union	Farmerville	173.421	279.094	LA 2 west – Bernice	Northern end of LA 2 concurrency; to Lake D'Arbonne State Park
Union	Farmerville	176.130	283.454	LA 549 – Truxno, Oakland	Southern terminus of LA 549
Union		184.875	297.527	LA 550	
Union	Mount Union	187.834– 187.871	302.290– 302.349	LA 558 – Lockhart, El Dorado	Southern terminus of LA 558
Union	Spearsville	190.795	307.055	LA 3269	Eastern terminus of LA 3269
Union	Spearsville	190.847– 190.871	307.138– 307.177	LA 3121 – Taylortown	Southern terminus of LA 3121
Union	Spearsville	190.896	307.217	LA 3269	Western terminus of LA 3269
Union	Lillie	194.070– 194.102	312.325– 312.377	US 63 / US 167 – Bernice, Junction City	Northern terminus
1.000 mi = 1.609 km; 1.000 km = 0.621 mi: Concurrency terminus

== Gallery ==
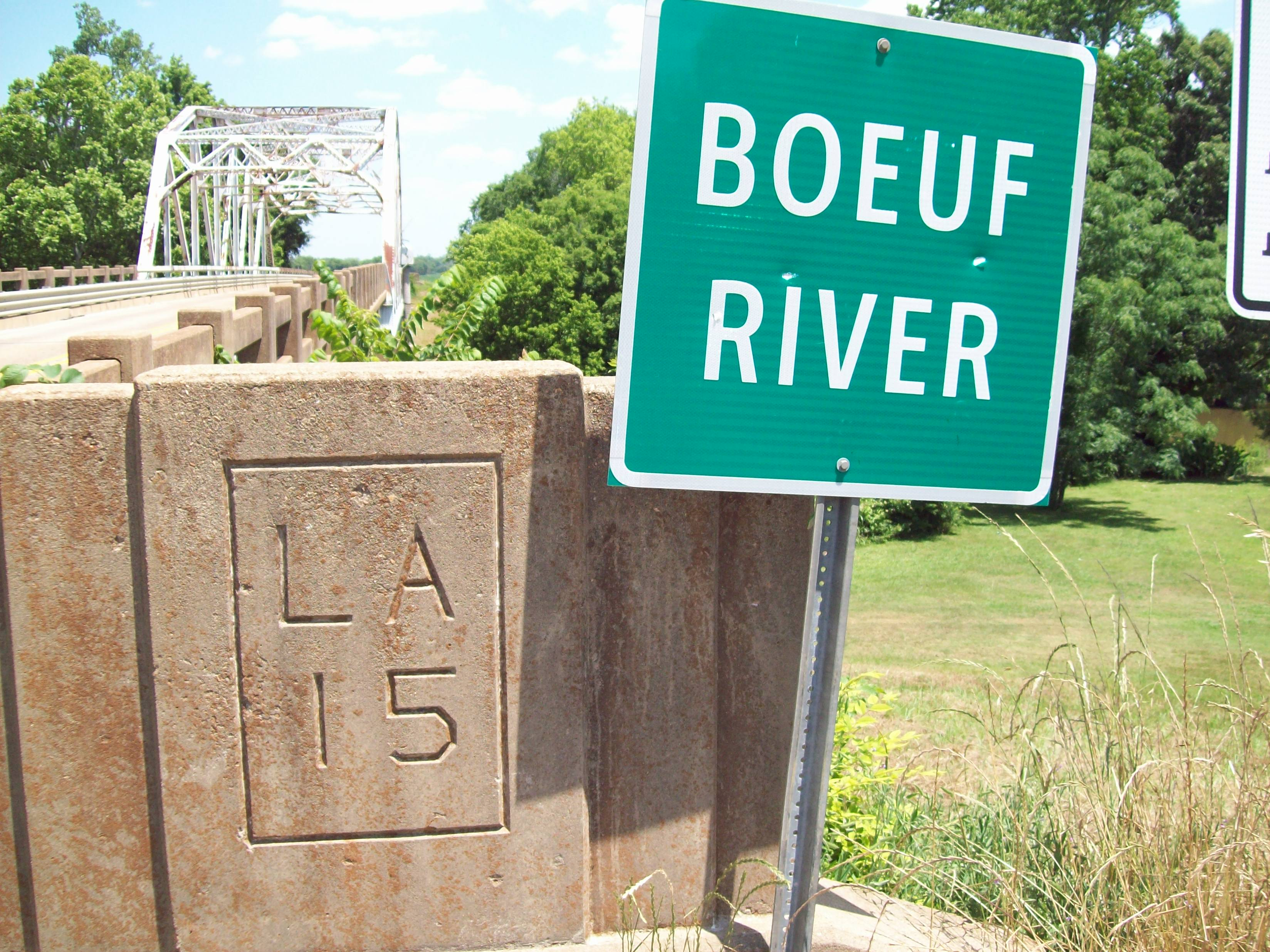
Bridge over the Boeuf River on LA 15

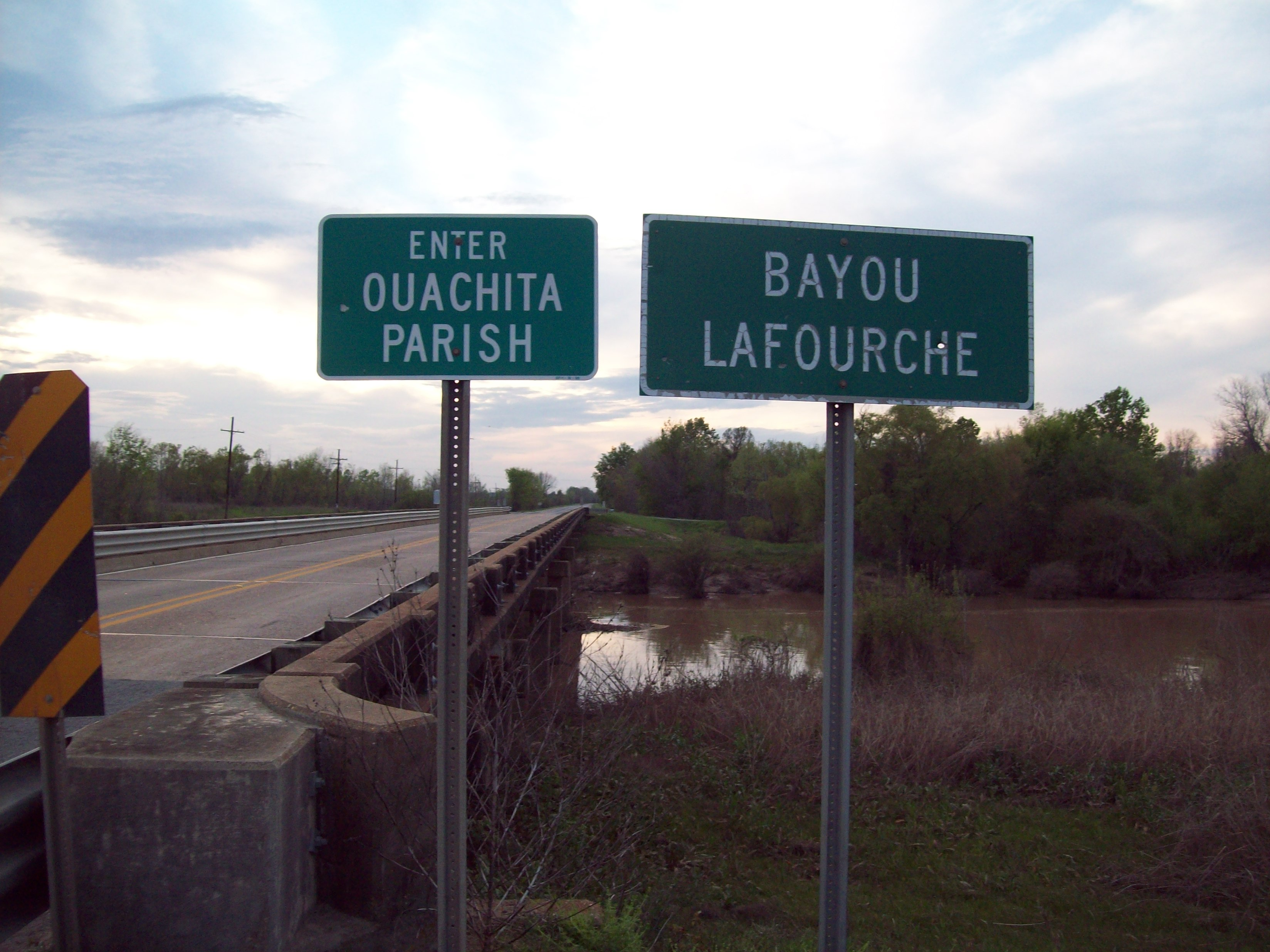
Ouachita/Richland Parish Line over Bayou Lafourche

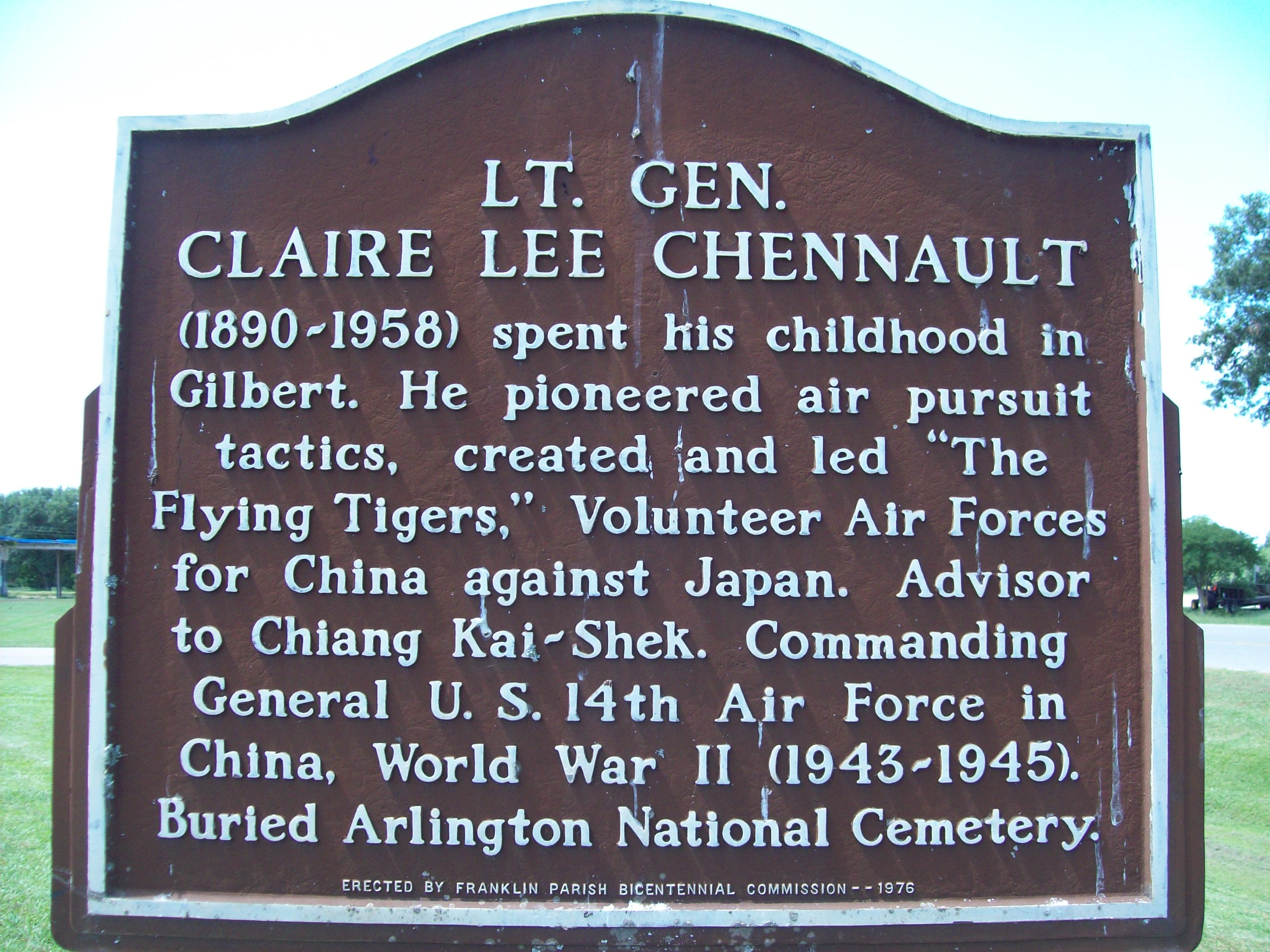
Historical marker for General Claire Chennault in Gibson

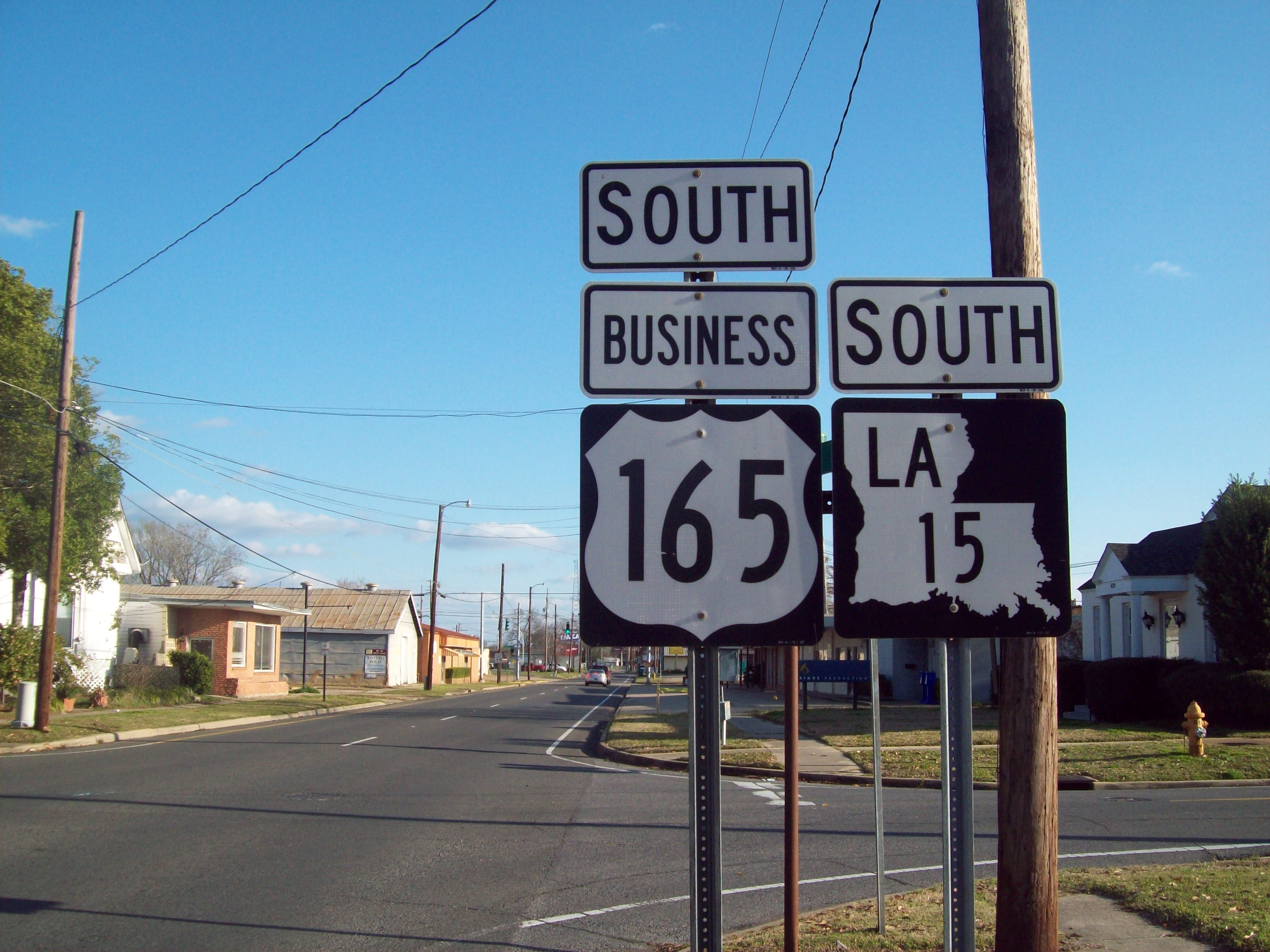
Signs along LA 15 in Monroe
