= Louisiana Highway 4 =

State highway in Louisiana, USA

Louisiana Highway 4

- Route of LA 4 highlighted in red

Route information
- Maintained by Louisiana DOTD
- Length: 164.537 mi (264.797 km)
- Existed: 1955 renumbering–present

Major junctions
- West end: US 71 at Loggy Bayou
- US 371 in Ringgold; LA 9 in Lucky; US 167 in Jonesboro; LA 34 in Chatham; US 165 in Columbia; US 425 / LA 15 / LA 17 in Winnsboro; US 65 in Newellton
- East end: LA 605 in Newellton

Location
- Country: United States
- State: Louisiana
- Parishes: Red River, Bienville, Jackson, Caldwell, Franklin, Tensas

Highway system
- Louisiana State Highway System; Interstate; US; State; Scenic
← LA 3	→ LA 5

Louisiana Highway 4 (LA 4) is a state highway located in northern Louisiana in the United States. It runs 164.54 miles (264.80 km) in an east–west direction from U.S. Highway 71 (US 71) at Loggy Bayou to LA 605 in Newellton.

The entire route parallels Interstate 20 (I-20) an average of about 20 miles (32 km) to the south. Along the way, it serves the city of Winnsboro and smaller towns such as Ringgold, Jonesboro, Chatham, Columbia, and Newellton (its eastern terminus). It also intersects many of the state's major north–south routes, such as US 71 (its western terminus), US 371, US 167, US 165, US 425, and US 65.

Though it runs primarily east–west, LA 4 meanders along rural roads for virtually its entire distance, bending considerably to the north and south in order to pass through the centers of various towns. LA 4 travels through five parishes, connecting the parish seats of the middle three (Jackson, Caldwell, and Franklin). Not quite a cross-state route, it begins at US 71 southeast of the Shreveport-Bossier City Metropolitan Area about 36 miles (58 km) east of the Texas state line and does not reach I-49, Louisiana's major north–south interstate. Its eastern terminus, however, comes within five miles (8.0 km) of the Mississippi state line at the Mississippi River.

== Route description ==
=== Western terminus to Jonesboro ===
From the west, LA 4 begins at an intersection with US 71 at the extreme southwest corner of Bienville Parish. It proceeds east as an undivided two-lane highway and runs along the Red River Parish line for 1.7 miles (2.7 km) before curving to the northeast toward Ringgold. After 6.2 miles (10.0 km), it intersects LA 790, which heads southeast to US 371 at Tullis. 2.2 miles (3.5 km) later, LA 4 enters Ringgold on Mill Street where it intersects LA 154 (School Street). The two highways proceed in a concurrency to the town's main junction at US 371 (Military Road), which connects to Minden on the north and Coushatta on the south. After making a brief jog south onto US 371, LA 4 and LA 154 turn east onto Bienville Road. At the eastern edge of town, LA 154 branches off to the northeast through Jamestown while LA 4 proceeds southeast for 8.9 miles (14.3 km) to Castor. Here it intersects LA 792, which also connects to Jamestown, and briefly turns southeast, continuing the route of that highway to the village's main junction. At a four-way intersection, LA 153 continues the route southeast to Ashland; LA 507 proceeds southwest toward Womack; and LA 4 turns northeast co-signed with LA 507 for one block until the latter turns north onto Kepler Road.

Leaving Castor, LA 4 proceeds in a general eastern direction for 11.2 miles (18.0 km) where it intersects LA 9 in an area known as Lucky. The immediate destinations of LA 9 are Bienville to the north and Saline to the south. 5.8 miles (9.3 km) later, LA 4 intersects LA 155, also connecting to LA 9 at Saline, and the two highways proceed in a concurrency to a point known as Friendship. Here, LA 501 heads south toward Calvin, and shortly thereafter, LA 155 splits off to the north toward Liberty Hill. Meanwhile, LA 4 curves to the southeast through Danville, a point on the Kansas City Southern Railway (KCS), and crosses the Dugdemona River into Jackson Parish 3.3 miles (5.3 km) later.

=== Jonesboro to Winnsboro ===
5.3 miles (8.5 km) inside the parish line, LA 4 enters Jonesboro, the parish seat, and widens to an undivided four-lane highway. It then turns east from South Cooper Street onto East Main Street, a divided two-lane street, and passes through the center of town. After crossing the KCS tracks, LA 4 intersects the concurrent US 167 and LA 147. US 167 connects to Ruston on the north and Winnfield on the south. After this junction, LA 4 narrows to an undivided two-lane highway and continues due east out of town for 5.0 miles (8.0 km) to Weston, where it intersects LA 811 (Gladway Road) and, 1.0 mile (1.6 km) later, LA 505. Following the latter intersection, LA 4 curves to the northeast for 9.7 miles (15.6 km) and crosses the Caney Creek Reservoir before entering the town of Chatham. Running through town on Shell Avenue, it intersects LA 146, another route into Ruston, and curves to the southeast. It then intersects LA 34, which heads to Winnfield on the south and the major city of Monroe to the northeast. Continuing southeast for 5.5 miles (8.9 km), LA 4 intersects LA 499 at a point near Hoods Mill and heads in a general eastward direction into Caldwell Parish.

After crossing the parish line, LA 4 curves to the southeast and intersects LA 557 at a point known as Vixen. 9.4 miles (15.1 km) later, LA 4 intersects LA 846 at Mount Pleasant. After a brief concurrency, LA 846 splits off to the north, running parallel to LA 4 toward the previous junction with LA 557. 2.4 miles (3.9 km) later, LA 4 intersects LA 3239, a gravel road that connects to LA 126 west of Grayson. After another 2.6 miles (4.2 km), LA 4 intersects LA 850 at Pulpwood Spur then curves to the northeast across the Union Pacific Railroad (UP) tracks to US 165 at Banks Springs, just north of Grayson. LA 4 turns northeast to follow US 165, becoming an undivided four-lane highway (with middle turning lane) into Columbia, the parish seat, intersecting LA 849 on the way. In Columbia, US 165 and LA 4 cross a high-level bridge over the Ouachita River, after which LA 4 resumes its eastward course as an undivided two-lane highway while US 165 continues north toward Monroe. Opposite a bend in the river, LA 4 intersects LA 133 and curves to the southeast, running roughly parallel to the river for 3.3 miles (5.3 km). LA 4 then turns back to the east while LA 559 continues south along the river. 5.7 miles (9.2 km) later, LA 4 crosses the Boeuf River into Franklin Parish after passing through the Boeuf Wildlife Management Area.

Continuing east for 6.5 miles (10.5 km), LA 4 reaches LA 135, the first of three junctions in an area known as Fort Necessity. Shortly afterward, LA 562 heads south and loops to the east across Turkey Creek Lake to Wisner, and finally, LA 128 heads east to Gilbert on US 425/LA 15. At this last junction, LA 4 curves to the northeast toward Winnsboro. After 6.1 miles (9.8 km), LA 4 intersects LA 865 at a point known as Brownell, followed 2.2 miles (3.5 km) later by LA 3201 (Riser Road), a connector to US 425/LA 15 on the south edge of Winnsboro.

=== Winnsboro to Newellton ===
LA 4 enters Winnsboro, which serves as the parish seat, and runs along Prairie Road. LA 4 then reaches the main thoroughfare, Front Street, an undivided four-lane roadway (with middle turning lane) and part of the concurrent US 425 and LA 15. LA 4 turns northwest onto Front Street, adding to the concurrency for a few blocks, to a four-way intersection where US 425 and LA 15 continue north toward Bastrop and Monroe, respectively; LA 130 heads west along Taylor Avenue; and LA 4 takes a sharp turn east onto Kinloch Street, becoming an undivided two-lane highway once again. This intersection also marks the western terminus of LA 17, which follows LA 4 east out of Winnsboro. Before exiting the city, LA 4 and LA 17 intersect the northern segment of LA 865 (Pine Street) and LA 864 (Loop Road), another connector to US 425/LA 15. Shortly after crossing the city limits, LA 17 splits off to the north toward Crowville.

After 3.3 miles (5.3 km), LA 4 intersects LA 863, which connects to LA 578 a short distance away. LA 4 turns to the southeast and intersects LA 578 itself, continuing the route of that highway south to a point known as Como, where it intersects and begins a concurrency with LA 128 northeast of Gilbert. Briefly following along a bend in Bayou Macon, LA 4 and LA 128 intersect LA 555, which travels northward along the bayou. Just east of the bayou is an intersection with LA 572 at Lorelein. 3.7 miles (6.0 km) east of this intersection, LA 4 and LA 128 cross the Tensas River into Tensas Parish.

2.1 miles (3.4 km) inside the parish line, LA 128 splits to the southeast toward St. Joseph. LA 4 proceeds eastward along the Tensas River for a short distance to LA 888 then continues for another 7.9 miles (12.7 km) to LA 575. Shortly afterward, LA 4 enters the town of Newellton, its final destination, and intersects US 65, which heads north to Tallulah and south to Ferriday. LA 4 follows Verona Street in Newellton and reaches its eastern terminus at LA 605 (Main Street), which runs along Lake St. Joseph, an ox-bow lake of the Mississippi River.

== History ==
In the original Louisiana Highway system in use between 1921 and 1955, the modern LA 4 made of parts of several routes, including: State Route 13 from the western terminus at US 71 to Ringgold; State Route 417 to Castor; State Route C-2203 to Friendship; State Route 13 again to Chatham; LA 17 to Winnsboro; State Route 16 east out of Winnsboro; State Route 48 to the modern junction with LA 128 east of the Tensas River; and State Route 76 to the eastern terminus in Newellton.

LA 4 was created with the 1955 Louisiana Highway renumbering, and its route has remained the same apart from a shift onto a new bridge at Columbia in Caldwell Parish.

In Columbia, LA 4 and US 165 originally curved slightly to the northeast at Church Street and crossed a vertical lift bridge over the Ouachita River. It then rejoined the location of the current alignment just south of the intersection where LA 4 turns eastward, separating from US 165. This bridge, built in 1935, was replaced by the current four-lane high-level span in 2007. This construction was part of a larger project to widen US 165 to four lanes throughout the state of Louisiana, completed in 2012. The original bridge has been demolished, but the approaches still exist as local roads.

== Major intersections ==
Parish	Location	mi	km	Destinations	Notes
Red River	Loggy Bayou	0.000	0.000	US 71 – Coushatta, Bossier City	Western terminus
Bienville		7.839	12.616	LA 790 east	Western terminus of LA 790
Bienville	Ringgold	11.507	18.519	LA 154 west (School Street) – Elm Grove	Western end of LA 154 concurrency
Bienville	Ringgold	11.920	19.183	US 371 north (Military Road) – Minden	Western end of US 371 concurrency
Bienville	Ringgold	11.964	19.254	US 371 south (Military Road) – Coushatta	Eastern end of US 371 concurrency
Bienville	Ringgold	12.797– 12.817	20.595– 20.627	LA 154 east – Jamestown	Eastern end of LA 154 concurrency
Bienville	Castor	21.686	34.900	LA 792 north – Jamestown	Southern terminus of LA 792
Bienville	Castor	22.109	35.581	LA 153 south (Front Street) – Ashland LA 507 south – Womack	Northern terminus of LA 153; western end of LA 507 concurrency
Bienville	Castor	22.137	35.626	LA 507 north (East Front Street) – Gibsland	Eastern end of LA 507 concurrency
Bienville	Lucky	33.322– 33.363	53.627– 53.693	LA 9 – Bienville, Saline	
Bienville		39.161– 39.179	63.024– 63.052	LA 155 south – Saline	Western end of LA 155 concurrency
Bienville	Friendship	41.054	66.070	LA 501 south – Calvin	Northern terminus of LA 501
Bienville		41.454– 41.539	66.714– 66.851	LA 155 north – Liberty Hill, Bienville	Eastern end of LA 155 concurrency
Jackson	Jonesboro	53.107	85.467	US 167 / LA 147 (Old Winnfield Road, Richard Zuber Thruway) – Ruston, Winnfield	
Jackson	Weston	58.160	93.599	LA 811 (Gladway Road)	Southern terminus of LA 811
Jackson	Weston	59.153	95.198	LA 505 – Wyatt, Dodson	Northern terminus of LA 505
Jackson		65.826	105.937	Lakeshore Drive – Jimmie Davis State Park	
Jackson	Chatham	69.332	111.579	LA 146 – Vernon, Ruston	Southern terminus of LA 146
Jackson	Chatham	69.957	112.585	LA 34 – Monroe, Winnfield	
Jackson	Hoods Mill	75.417	121.372	LA 499 south	Northern terminus of LA 499
Caldwell	Vixen	83.795	134.855	LA 557 – Monroe	Southern terminus of LA 557
Caldwell	Mount Pleasant	93.137	149.889	LA 846 west	Western end of LA 846 concurrency
Caldwell		94.365	151.866	LA 846 north	Eastern end of LA 846 concurrency
Caldwell		96.745	155.696	LA 3239	Northern terminus of LA 3239
Caldwell	Pulpwood Spur	99.349	159.887	LA 850	Northern terminus of LA 850
Caldwell	Banks Springs	100.411	161.596	US 165 south – Alexandria	Western end of US 165 concurrency
Caldwell	Columbia Heights	100.885	162.359	LA 849 – Copenhagen	Northern terminus of LA 849
Caldwell	Columbia	102.133– 102.716	164.367– 165.305	Governor John J. McKeithen Bridge over Ouachita River	
Caldwell		102.910	165.618	US 165 north – Monroe	Eastern end of US 165 concurrency
Caldwell		104.257	167.785	LA 133 north – Hebert, Start	Southern terminus of LA 133
Caldwell		107.587	173.144	LA 559 – Duty Ferry	Northern terminus of LA 559
Caldwell–Franklin parish line		113.134– 113.391	182.072– 182.485	Bridge over Boeuf River	
Franklin	Fort Necessity	119.795	192.791	LA 135 north – Liddieville	Southern terminus of LA 135
Franklin	Fort Necessity	120.167– 120.219	193.390– 193.474	LA 562	Western terminus of LA 562
Franklin		121.288– 121.350	195.194– 195.294	LA 128 east – Gilbert	Western terminus of LA 128
Franklin	Brownell	127.419	205.061	LA 865	Southern terminus of LA 865 (southern section)
Franklin		129.601	208.573	LA 3201 (Riser Road)	Western terminus of LA 3201
Franklin	Winnsboro	131.016	210.850	US 425 / LA 15 south (Front Street) – Ferriday	Western end of US 425/LA 15 concurrency
Franklin	Winnsboro	131.340	211.371	US 425 / LA 15 north (Front Street) – Monroe LA 17 begins LA 130 west (Taylor Avenue) – Liddieville	Eastern end of US 425/LA 15 concurrency; western terminus of LA 17; western end of LA 17 concurrency; eastern terminus of LA 130
Franklin	Winnsboro	131.898	212.269	LA 865 (Pine Street)	Southern terminus of LA 865 (northern section)
Franklin	Winnsboro	132.329	212.963	LA 864 (Loop Road)	Northern terminus of LA 864
Franklin		133.066	214.149	LA 17 north – Crowville, Delhi	Eastern end of LA 17 concurrency
Franklin		136.250– 136.347	219.273– 219.429	LA 863	Western terminus of LA 863
Franklin		138.865	223.482	LA 578 – Crowville	Southern terminus of LA 578
Franklin	Como	141.156– 141.272	227.169– 227.355	LA 128 west – Gilbert	Western end of LA 128 concurrency
Franklin		142.054	228.614	LA 555	Southern terminus of LA 555
Franklin	Lorelein	144.270	232.180	LA 572	Eastern terminus of LA 572
Franklin–Tensas parish line		147.974– 148.086	238.141– 238.321	Bridge over Tensas River	
Tensas		150.078	241.527	LA 128 east – St. Joseph	Eastern end of LA 128 concurrency
Tensas		154.443	248.552	LA 888	Southern terminus of LA 888
Tensas		162.339	261.259	LA 575	Southern terminus of LA 575
Tensas	Newellton	163.218– 163.261	262.674– 262.743	US 65 – Tallulah, Ferriday	
Tensas	Newellton	164.537	264.797	LA 605 (Main Street)	Eastern terminus
1.000 mi = 1.609 km; 1.000 km = 0.621 mi: Concurrency terminus
