= Louisiana Highway 130 =

State highway in Louisiana, United States

Louisiana Highway 130

- Route of LA 130 highlighted in red

Route information
- Maintained by Louisiana DOTD
- Length: 7.323 mi (11.785 km)
- Existed: 1955 renumbering–present

Major junctions
- West end: LA 135 north of Liddieville
- East end: US 425 / LA 4 / LA 15 / LA 17 in Winnsboro

Location
- Country: United States
- State: Louisiana
- Parishes: Franklin

Highway system
- Louisiana State Highway System; Interstate; US; State; Scenic
← LA 129	→ LA 131
← SR 238	239	→ SR 240

Louisiana Highway 130 (LA 130) is a state highway located in Franklin Parish, Louisiana. It runs 7.32 miles (11.78 km) in an east–west direction from LA 135 north of Liddieville to a junction with U.S. Highway 425 (US 425), LA 4, LA 15, and LA 17 in Winnsboro.

The route connects the rural area near Liddieville with the city of Winnsboro, the parish seat and only city in Franklin Parish.

== Route description ==
From the west, LA 130 begins at an intersection with LA 135 in Franklin Parish just north of Liddieville. LA 135 connects with LA 15 to Monroe on the north and to LA 4 at Fort Necessity on the south. LA 130 proceeds eastward through a rural area. After 6.4 miles (10.3 km), it enters the city of Winnsboro, the parish seat, where it becomes known as Taylor Avenue. Now passing through a largely residential area, LA 130 intersects LA 618 (Lone Cedar Road), which heads northwest to LA 135.

Shortly afterward, LA 130 curves slightly to the southeast and reaches its eastern terminus at a junction with US 425, LA 4, LA 15, and LA 17. From this intersection, US 425 and LA 15 travel concurrently along Front Street north toward Monroe and Bastrop and south toward Ferriday and Natchez, Mississippi. LA 4 also travels south briefly along Front Street before heading west toward Columbia via Fort Necessity. Straight ahead, LA 4 and LA 17 travel concurrently along Kinloch Street and Main Street before splitting to the east and north toward Newellton and Delhi, respectively.

The route is classified by the Louisiana Department of Transportation and Development (La DOTD) as a rural major collector from the western terminus to a point just west of Winnsboro and as an urban collector from there to the eastern terminus. Average daily traffic volume in 2013 is reported as 2,000 for the majority of the route, increasing to 7,600 east of Polk Street in Winnsboro. LA 130 is an undivided two-lane highway for its entire length with a posted speed limit of 55 mph (90 km/h), reduced to 35 mph (55 km/h) within the city of Winnsboro.

== History ==
=== Pre-1955 route numbering ===
State Route 239
- Location: Franklin Parish
- Length: 7.4 mi (11.9 km)
- Existed: 1928–1955

In the original Louisiana Highway system in use between 1921 and 1955, the modern LA 130 was designated as State Route 239.

Route 239. From Route No. 15 at Winnsboro, by Ogden to parish line, connecting with Columbia Highway.

— 1928 legislative route description

Route 239 was created in 1928 by an act of the state legislature. It originally followed a longer route that began on the Caldwell–Franklin parish line at the Boeuf River. From there, it proceeded east along the present route of LA 4 to a point just beyond Mason where it continued northeast onto what is now a local road to the present route of LA 135. It then followed LA 135 northward through Liddieville to the western terminus of the present LA 130, a point formerly known as Ogden. This western portion of the route overlapped six state route designations and was dropped prior to the 1955 Louisiana Highway renumbering. Only the portion between Ogden and Winnsboro remained under the designation of Route 239.

=== Post-1955 route history ===
LA 130 was created in 1955 as a direct renumbering of State Route 239.

La 130—From a junction with La 135 at or near Liddieville to a junction with La 15 at or near Winnsboro.

— 1955 legislative route description

Its route has remained the same to the present day. The eastern terminus at LA 15 in Winnsboro was then, as it remains today, also a junction with LA 4 and LA 17. US 425 was added to the list in 2005 after its extension from Bastrop southward to Natchez, Mississippi, overlapping LA 15 through Winnsboro.

== Major intersections ==
The entire highway is in Franklin Parish.

Location	mi	km	Destinations	Notes
	0.000	0.000	LA 135 – Liddieville	Western terminus
Winnsboro	7.032	11.317	LA 618 (Lone Cedar Road)	Eastern terminus of LA 618
Winnsboro	7.283– 7.323	11.721– 11.785	US 425 / LA 4 west / LA 15 (Front Street) – Monroe, Ferriday LA 4 east / LA 17 north (Kinloch Street) – Delhi	Eastern terminus
1.000 mi = 1.609 km; 1.000 km = 0.621 mi
