= U.S. Route 65 in Louisiana =

Section of U.S. Highway in Louisiana, United States

U.S. Highway 65
- Route of US 65 highlighted in red

Route information
- Maintained by Louisiana DOTD
- Length: 100.770 mi (162.174 km)
- Existed: 1926–present
- Tourist routes: Great River Road

Major junctions
- South end: US 425 / LA 15 in Clayton
- LA 4 in Newellton; I-20 in Tallulah; US 80 in Tallulah; LA 2 north of Lake Providence
- North end: US 65 at Arkansas state line north of Gassoway

Location
- Country: United States
- State: Louisiana
- Parishes: Concordia, Tensas, Madison, East Carroll

Highway system
- United States Numbered Highway System; List; Special; Divided; Louisiana State Highway System; Interstate; US; State; Scenic
← LA 64	→ LA 66

U.S. Highway 65 (US 65) is a part of the United States Numbered Highway System that spans 966 miles (1,555 km) from Clayton, Louisiana to Albert Lea, Minnesota. Within the state of Louisiana, the highway travels 100.77 miles (162.17 km) from the national southern terminus at US 425/LA 15 in Clayton to the Arkansas state line north of Lake Providence.

US 65 parallels the west bank of the Mississippi River through the northeastern portion of Louisiana. It traverses four parishes. Newellton, Tallulah, and Lake Providence, which constitute the largest towns along the route. In Tallulah, US 65 has a junction with Interstate 20, the principal highway across northern Louisiana. I-20 connects to a bridge across the Mississippi River at Vicksburg, Mississippi, which is the only automobile crossing between Greenville and Natchez.

The Natchez–Vidalia Bridge was part of US 65 prior to 2005 when the designation was replaced by that of US 425 between Clayton and Natchez. During the years 1936 to 1951, US 65 was more than double its present length as it overlapped US 61 from Natchez south to New Orleans.

== Route description ==
=== Clayton to Tallulah ===
From the south, US 65 begins at a junction with the concurrent US 425/LA 15 in Clayton, a small town in northern Concordia Parish. US 425/LA 15 travels along a widely spaced four-lane one-way pair through town en route to its immediate destinations of Ferriday and Sicily Island. US 65 heads northeast from this junction as an undivided two-lane highway and crosses into Tensas Parish. An intersection with LA 568 at Azucena leads to Lake St. John, an oxbow lake of the nearby Mississippi River. Soon afterward, US 65 passes through the western edge of Waterproof, the first of several towns on the route located along the river's west bank. Several minor state highways, such as LA 3209 (Church Lane), connect US 65 with Waterproof's main street.

Continuing northeast, US 65 bypasses St. Joseph, the parish seat. However, a junction with LA 128 at Avondale provides access to the town. Just north of St. Joseph, US 65 passes to the west of Lake Bruin, another oxbow lake. Points of interest in this area include Lake Bruin State Park and the Winter Quarters State Historic Site. US 65 proceeds through the western edge of Newellton, a town situated on Lake St. Joseph, a third oxbow lake of the Mississippi River. LA 4 (Verona Street) leads into the center of town and also connects to the city of Winnsboro in neighboring Franklin Parish. After passing through Somerset, US 65 crosses into Madison Parish at a point known as Quimby.

US 65 winds gently through southern Madison Parish for 11 miles (18 km) before entering Richmond, a small village adjacent to the parish seat, the city of Tallulah. The highway passes through an interchange with I-20 at exit 171, connecting with Vicksburg, Mississippi and Monroe, Louisiana. Entering Tallulah proper, US 65 crosses a bridge over Walnut Bayou and curves northeast onto the undivided four-lane thoroughfare of Bayou Drive, flanked by the bayou and a residential neighborhood.

=== Tallulah to Arkansas state line ===
Heading into the business section of Tallulah, US 65 divides onto the one-way pair of Cedar and Chestnut Streets, thus becoming a divided four-lane highway briefly. One block after crossing the Kansas City Southern Railway (KCS) line, the route intersects US 80 (East Green Street), which serves local traffic along the I-20 corridor. The travel lanes of US 65 converge as the highway heads out of Tallulah and begins to follow alongside the Delta Southern Railroad (DSRR) tracks.

North of Tallulah, US 65 travels through an extended stretch of open farmland. Immediately after crossing into East Carroll Parish, the highway passes through the tiny community of Sondheimer. At a point known as Alsatia, US 65 intersects LA 580, which heads west toward Poverty Point, a UNESCO World Heritage Site located near the village of Epps. Continuing due north, US 65 passes through such rural points as Transylvania and Hollybrook before entering the parish seat, Lake Providence, which is located on an oxbow lake of the same name. After crossing the corporate limits, US 65 immediately divides onto the one-way pair of Sparrow and Scarborough Streets. In the center of town, the route turns left onto Lake Street and becomes an undivided two-lane highway again.

US 65 takes on the character of a scenic drive as it travels out of town hugging the shore of Lake Providence. Along this stretch is a junction with LA 2 at its eastern terminus, connecting with Oak Grove and Bastrop. Departing from the lake shore, US 65 curves due north and rejoins the straight alignment of the DSRR tracks for its final 10 miles (16 km) in Louisiana. The highway crosses into the state of Arkansas just north of Gassoway and proceeds toward Eudora en route to Little Rock.

=== Route classification and data ===
US 65 alternates between a rural and urban principal arterial over the course of its route, as determined by the Louisiana Department of Transportation and Development (La DOTD). Daily traffic volume in 2013 peaked at 10,400 vehicles in Tallulah. The remainder of the route generally averaged between 2,200 and 5,800 vehicles with a low of 1,840 reported near the Arkansas state line. The posted speed limit is 55 mph (90 km/h) for most of the route but is reduced as low as 25 or 35 mph (40 or 55 km/h) within corporate limits.

Within Louisiana, the entirety of US 65 serves as part of a National Scenic Byway known as the Great River Road. This byway consists of a network of roads that parallel the Mississippi River through ten states. The Louisiana portion encompasses several state highways, extending as far south as Venice near the mouth of the river.

== History ==
=== Original route and southern extension ===
US 65 was designated in November 1926 as one of the inaugural routes of the numbered U.S. Highway system. It was routed entirely along the existing State Route 3, one of Louisiana's original state highways created only five years earlier. Known as the Scenic Highway, it paralleled the west bank of the Mississippi River through the northeastern portion of the state and served as an important connection between the capital cities of Louisiana and Arkansas. Like Route 3, US 65 once extended further south to Vidalia, a small city opposite Natchez, Mississippi. At the time, a ferry carried the route across the river to connect with US 61, the principal route to New Orleans.

In 1934, the US 65 Lakes-to-Gulf Highway Association was formed to promote travel between Minneapolis–St. Paul and New Orleans. One of its principal objectives was having US 65 officially extended from Natchez south to New Orleans. Two years later, the designation was applied to the entire route of US 61 south of Natchez as it traveled back into Louisiana and passed through Baton Rouge en route to its terminus in New Orleans. This change extended US 65 a distance of 187 miles (301 km) and allowed motorists to follow a single highway number from New Orleans to Little Rock, Arkansas. It came three years after US 61 was almost entirely relocated between New Orleans and Baton Rouge from its original path alongside the winding Mississippi River onto the modern, streamlined Airline Highway. This routing remained in effect until 1951 when the Louisiana Department of Highways eliminated such lengthy U.S. Highway concurrencies, and the southern terminus of US 65 was moved back to Natchez.

=== Early improvements and paving ===
When originally designated in 1926, US 65 was a gravel-surfaced highway throughout its route in Louisiana. Hard-surfacing of the highway was promised by Huey P. Long during his successful 1928 gubernatorial campaign and also by state senator and Louisiana Highway Commission chairman, O.K. Allen. By 1930, the perceived lack of initiative in fulfilling this promise drew much criticism from the pair's political opponents based in northeastern Louisiana. However, in October of that year, bidding was opened for 31 contracts in the "largest letting for road and bridge construction in the history of the state" up to that time. This included the paving of an 11-mile (18 km) stretch of US 65 in East Carroll Parish between Lake Providence and Transylvania that was completed the following year. The remainder of the highway south to Vidalia was provided for soon afterward and was completed by the summer of 1932.

This left only the portion between Lake Providence and the Arkansas state line to be hard-surfaced, which was not carried out until the spring of 1938. While the earlier paving projects had closely followed the established gravel alignment, this last project straightened the highway north of Lake Providence by following the Missouri Pacific Railroad line (now the Delta Southern Railroad). The original route had hugged the shore of two oxbow lakes known as Lake Providence and Old River between Highland and Millikin. (Note: The bypassed route north of Lake Providence was partially retained in the state highway system as State Route 3-D, indicating an earlier alignment of Route 3, the state highway counterpart to US 65. It then became LA 568 in the 1955 Louisiana Highway renumbering until being transferred to local control in 1974.)

=== Natchez–Vidalia Bridge ===
In 1940, US 65 received a major improvement when the first Natchez–Vidalia Bridge was constructed across the Mississippi River, replacing a ferry service that had existed for over a century. The bridge's construction was primarily advanced by the state of Mississippi and the local governments of Adams County and the city of Natchez. The project was financed through matching loans totaling almost $3,800,000 from two New Deal programs, the Public Works Administration and the Reconstruction Finance Corporation, which were approved in June 1936 and October 1938, respectively. A toll equaling that of the existing ferry would be charged only until the loans were repaid. Under this arrangement, the Louisiana Legislature aided the project by passing a special bill in June 1938 allowing the bridge to be exempt from state taxes. The location chosen for the new bridge was nearly the same as the ferry landing on the Louisiana side.

Construction began in December 1938, and the bridge was officially opened to traffic with great ceremony on September 26, 1940. US 65 shared the new bridge with US 84, which had been extended into Louisiana in 1934. The cantilevered through truss structure was designed by the engineering firm of Ash, Howard and Needles, which had been responsible for the US 80 bridge at Vicksburg a decade earlier. In 1952, the bridge's debts were paid off, and the toll was eliminated on the twelfth anniversary of its opening.

While the Natchez–Vidalia Bridge was under construction, virtually the entire town of Vidalia consisting of about 1,000 citizens, was demolished and rebuilt several blocks away from the river bank. This allowed for the construction of a setback levee that would enable the widening of the river at Natchez and reduce the pressure of the current on its banks, which was cited as a great hazard to both towns. The moving of Vidalia increased the construction cost of the bridge from its original estimate of $2,500,000 to $4,000,000.

=== Route relocation and further improvements ===
Between about 1949 and 1962, virtually the entire route of US 65 was relocated onto a streamlined alignment south of Tallulah, often following the now-abandoned Missouri Pacific Railroad line. (Note: All bypassed routes segments in Concordia and Tensas Parishes were designated as State Route C-2171 until the 1955 Louisiana Highway renumbering.) This work was accomplished in several stages, beginning with the construction of a new alignment between Ferriday and Waterproof in 1950. The new route traveled through Clayton, bypassing what is now LA 568 along the shore of Lake St. John. At the same time, the town of St. Joseph was bypassed, eliminating a sharp loop through the town that is now part of LA 128 and LA 605. In 1953, US 65 was straightened through the Newellton area, moving the route slightly outside of the town and bypassing another section of the current LA 605 along the shore of Lake St. Joseph. A small loop through the town of Waterproof was bypassed around 1958 and is now another part of LA 568. This was roughly concurrent with the slight straightening of the route through Vidalia, which eliminated some modest curves and bypassed what is now known as Murray Drive. The streamlined alignment between Waterproof and St. Joseph was opened by 1960, and in Madison Parish between Quimby and Tallulah around 1962.

Further improvements to US 65 during the mid- to late 1960s involved widening the highway to four lanes through Tallulah and between Vidalia and Ferriday. The four-lane highway was extended from Ferriday to Clayton around 1982 while construction was underway on a second span of the Natchez–Vidalia Bridge. By the late 1970s, daily traffic counts of 20,000 vehicles on the narrow two-lane span had necessitated the planning of a new crossing. Construction costs for the second span were estimated at $41 million, and the work was completed between 1985 and 1988. The new bridge was officially dedicated on June 21, 1988, and carried two-way traffic briefly while the original bridge was reconditioned. Each bridge then began to carry two lanes of traffic, creating a four-lane highway crossing of the Mississippi River at Natchez.

The only major change to US 65 since this time occurred when US 425 was extended from Bastrop, Louisiana to Natchez, Mississippi largely over the existing alignment of LA 15. US 65 was truncated to its present southern terminus in Clayton as the US 425 designation replaced it between Clayton and Natchez. This change was approved by the American Association of State Highway Officials (AASHTO) in 2005.

== Major intersections ==
Parish	Location	mi	km	Destinations	Notes
Concordia	Clayton	0.000– 0.157	0.000– 0.253	US 425 / LA 15 south – Ferriday, Natchez US 425 / LA 15 north – Sicily Island, Winnsboro	Southern terminus; one-way pair on US 425/LA 15
Concordia	Clayton	0.238	0.383	LA 900	Northern terminus of LA 900
Tensas	Azucena	7.479	12.036	LA 568 south – Lake St. John	South end of LA 568 concurrency
Tensas		10.019	16.124	LA 566 LA 568 north	Eastern terminus of LA 566; north end of LA 568 concurreny; 0.4 miles (0.64 km) south of Waterproof
Tensas		11.672	18.784	LA 3209 (Myrtle Grove Lane)	Western terminus of LA 3209
Tensas	Goldman	12.358– 12.375	19.888– 19.916	LA 568	
Tensas		15.965	25.693	LA 896	Eastern terminus of LA 896
Tensas	Avondale	22.000– 22.034	35.406– 35.460	LA 128 west – Winnsboro	South end of LA 128 concurrency
Tensas	Avondale	22.248	35.805	LA 128 east – St. Joseph	North end of LA 128 concurrency
Tensas		26.778	43.095	LA 607	Western terminus of LA 607
Tensas	Newellton	31.367– 31.405	50.480– 50.541	LA 4 (Verona Street) – Newellton, Winnsboro	
Tensas		35.705	57.462	LA 888	
Tensas		38.030	61.203	LA 605	Northern terminus of LA 605
Tensas	Somerset	38.787	62.422	LA 575 / LA 898	Northern terminus of LA 575; southern terminus of LA 898
Tensas	Somerset	39.299	63.246	LA 898	Northern terminus of LA 898
Madison	Quimby	43.341	69.751	LA 603	Southern terminus of LA 603
Madison	Laciede	52.304	84.175	LA 603	Northern terminus of LA 603
Madison	Richmond–Tallulah line	54.722– 55.135	88.067– 88.731	I-20 – Vicksburg, Monroe	Exit 171 on I-20
Madison	Tallulah	55.237	88.895	LA 3202 (Felicia Drive)	Western terminus of LA 3202
Madison	Tallulah	56.294	90.596	LA 601 (Dabney Street)	Northern terminus of LA 601
Madison	Tallulah	56.423	90.804	US 80 (East Green Street)	To Tensas River National Wildlife Refuge
East Carroll	Alsatia	71.656	115.319	LA 580	Eastern terminus of LA 580
East Carroll	Transylvania	76.188	122.613	LA 581	Eastern terminus of LA 581
East Carroll		83.560	134.477	LA 3181	Eastern terminus of LA 3181
East Carroll	Lake Providence	84.724	136.350	LA 883-1 (Fourth Street)	Eastern terminus of LA 883-1
East Carroll	Lake Providence	85.159	137.050	LA 596 (North Hood Street)	Southern terminus of LA 596
East Carroll	Lake Providence	85.949	138.322	LA 883-2 (Charles D. Jones Boulevard)	Northern terminus of LA 883-2
East Carroll		86.472	139.163	LA 134 west (Tensas Bayou Road) – Epps	Eastern terminus of LA 134
East Carroll		89.940– 90.006	144.744– 144.851	LA 2 west – Oak Grove, Bastrop	Eastern terminus of LA 2
East Carroll	Panola	94.084	151.414	LA 596	Northern terminus of LA 596
East Carroll	Gassoway	99.764	160.555	LA 585 – Kilbourne	Eastern terminus of LA 585
East Carroll		100.770	162.174	US 65 north – Eudora	Continuation in Arkansas
1.000 mi = 1.609 km; 1.000 km = 0.621 mi: Concurrency terminus

== Bypass route ==
U.S. Highway 65 Bypass
- Location: Baton Rouge
- Length: 10.4 mi (16.7 km)
- Existed: 1941–1951

U.S. Highway 65 Bypass (US 65 Byp.) ran 10.4 miles (16.7 km) in a general north–south direction around Baton Rouge, the capital city of Louisiana. It entirely duplicated the path of US 61 Byp. and existed during the period that US 65 was co-signed with US 61 between New Orleans, Louisiana and Natchez, Mississippi. (Note: US 61/65 Byp. also carried the hidden state route designation of State Route C-1500, which was applied to the entirety of Airline Highway prior to the 1955 Louisiana Highway renumbering.) The route followed the recently constructed Airline Highway around what was then the outside of town, allowing through traffic from the south and east to access the Mississippi River Bridge while avoiding the downtown area. The bypass is now part of mainline US 61 and US 190.

From the south, US 61/65 Byp. began in an area known as Nesser, which was at that time located outside the Baton Rouge city limits. It traveled northwest on Airline Highway as it branched off of mainline US 61/65 (Jefferson Highway). Directly east of the downtown area, the route intersected US 190 (Florida Boulevard) at a traffic circle that has since been replaced by a cloverleaf interchange. With mainline US 190 heading west directly into Downtown Baton Rouge, Airline Highway continued northwest as US 61/65/190 Byp. and intersected State Route 37 (Greenwell Springs Road). The route proceeded to make a bend around the northeast side of the city and crossed State Route 36 (Plank Road). Heading due west a short distance, the bypass rejoined all three mainline U.S. Routes at an interchange with Scenic Highway. From this junction, US 61/65 headed north toward Natchez, Mississippi while US 190 continued west across the old Mississippi River Bridge toward Opelousas co-signed with US 71.

Major intersections
The entire highway was in East Baton Rouge Parish.

Location	mi	km	Destinations	Notes
Nesser	0.0	0.0	US 61 / US 65 / SR 1 (Jefferson Highway) – Baton Rouge, New Orleans US 61 Byp. begins	Southern terminus of US 61/65 Byp.; south end of US 61 Byp. concurrency
	2.0	3.2	SR 7-D (Old Hammond Highway)	Western terminus of LA 7-D
Baton Rouge	3.7	6.0	US 190 / SR 7 (Florida Boulevard) – Baton Rouge, Hammond US 190 Byp. begins	Traffic circle; eastern terminus of US 190 Byp.; south end of US 190 Byp. concurrency
Baton Rouge	5.7	9.2	SR 37 (Greenwell Springs Road) – Greenwell Springs	
Baton Rouge	9.1	14.6	SR 36 (Plank Road) – Clinton	
Baton Rouge	10.4	16.7	US 61 / US 65 / US 190 east / SR 3 (Scenic Highway) – Baton Rouge, Natchez US 71 north / US 190 west (Airline Highway) – Opelousas US 61 Byp. / US 190 Byp. ends	Interchange; northern terminus of US 61/65 Byp.; southern terminus of US 71; western terminus of US 190 Byp.; north end of US 61/190 Byp. concurrency
1.000 mi = 1.609 km; 1.000 km = 0.621 mi: Concurrency terminus

== Notes ==
U.S. Route 65
Previous state: Terminus	Louisiana	Next state: Arkansas
