= Jigger, Louisiana =

- Unincorporated community
- Location within Louisiana Location within the United States
- Coordinates: 32°02′06″N 91°44′48″W
- Country: United States
- State: Louisiana
- Parish: Franklin
- Elevation: 66 ft (20 m)
- Time zone: UTC-6 (Central (CST))
  - Summer (DST): UTC-5 (CDT)
- ZIP code: 71249
- Area code: 318
- GNIS feature ID: 543343

Jigger is an unincorporated community in Franklin Parish, Louisiana, United States. Jigger is located on Louisiana Highway 128, five miles (8.0 kilometers) west-southwest of Gilbert. Jigger has a U.S. Postal Service office with ZIP code 71249. The community was named after the five-year-old son's dog of the first postmaster, whose name was selected for the community by the Postal Service.
