= Caleb Martin (American football) =

American football player (1924–1994)

No. 82
- Position: Tackle

Personal information
- Born: February 10, 1924; Winnsboro, Louisiana, U.S.
- Died: September 10, 1994 (aged 70); Winnsboro, Louisiana, U.S.
- Listed height: 6 ft 4 in (1.93 m)
- Listed weight: 245 lb (111 kg)

Career information
- High school: Winnsboro
- College: Louisiana Tech
- NFL draft: 1947: undrafted

Career history
- Chicago Cardinals (1947)

Awards and highlights
- NFL champion (1947)
- Stats at Pro Football Reference

Caleb Snyder Martin (February 10, 1924 – September 10, 1994) was an American professional football tackle who played one season with the Chicago Cardinals of the National Football League (NFL). He played college football at Louisiana Polytechnic Institute.

== Early life and college ==
Caleb Snyder Martin was born on February 10, 1924, in Winnsboro, Louisiana. He attended Winnsboro High School in Winnsboro.

He played college football for the Louisiana Tech Bulldogs of Louisiana Polytechnic Institute, lettering in 1946.

== Professional career ==
Martin went undrafted in the 1947 NFL draft and later signed with the Chicago Cardinals on July 14, 1947. He played in ten games for the Cardinals in 1947, recording one fumble recovery. The Cardinals beat the Philadelphia Eagles in the 1947 NFL Championship Game. He became a free agent after the 1947 season.

== Personal life ==
Martin served in the United States Army. He died on September 10, 1994, in Winnsboro.
