= Pine Grove, Ouachita Parish, Louisiana =

Pine Grove, Louisiana
- Unincorporated community
- Location within Louisiana Location within the United States
- Coordinates: 32°27′13″N 92°03′04″W
- Country: United States
- State: Louisiana
- Parish: Ouachita
- Elevation: 69 ft (21 m)
- Time zone: UTC-6 (Central (CST))
  - Summer (DST): UTC-5 (CDT)
- Area code: 318
- GNIS feature ID: 538164

Pine Grove is an unincorporated community in Ouachita Parish, Louisiana, United States. Pine Grove is located on Louisiana Highway 15, 5.5 miles (8.9 km) southeast of downtown Monroe.
