= Crimea, Louisiana =

Unincorporated community in Tensas Parish, Louisiana, USA

- Unincorporated community
- Location within Louisiana Location within the United States
- Coordinates: 31°58′38″N 91°20′11″W
- Country: United States
- State: Louisiana
- Parish: Tensas
- Elevation: 66 ft (20 m)
- Time zone: UTC-6 (Central (CST))
  - Summer (DST): UTC-5 (CDT)
- Area code: 318
- GNIS feature ID: 541080

Crimea is an unincorporated community in Tensas Parish, Louisiana, United States.

== In popular culture ==
The small community was referenced in the parody news website The Daily Currant describing that American patriots were protecting the community from invasion. This was a parody of the conflict in Crimea, a region disputed between Russia and Ukraine in an escalation of situations during the intervention.
