= Azucena, Louisiana =

Unincorporated community in Louisiana, U.S.

Coordinates: 31°46′41″N 91°26′16″W

Azucena is an unincorporated community in Tensas Parish, Louisiana, United States.

== History ==
Azucena was named after Azucena Plantation, which likely took its name from a character in Verdi's opera Il trovatore.
