= Extension, Louisiana =

- Unincorporated community
- Location within Louisiana Location within the United States
- Coordinates: 31°58′15″N 91°48′21″W
- Country: United States
- State: Louisiana
- Parish: Franklin
- Elevation: 62 ft (19 m)
- Time zone: UTC-6 (Central (CST))
  - Summer (DST): UTC-5 (CDT)
- ZIP code: 71243
- Area code: 318
- GNIS feature ID: 543195

Extension is an unincorporated community in Franklin Parish, Louisiana, United States. Its ZIP code is 71243.

== Notable people ==
Singer and songwriter Richard Berry was born in Extension. He is known for writing one of the world's most recorded songs, "Louie Louie."
