= Archibald, Louisiana =

Unincorporated community in Louisiana, U.S.

Coordinates: 32°20′57″N 91°46′38″W

Archibald is an unincorporated community in Richland Parish, Louisiana, United States. The ZIP Code for Archibald is 71218.

== History ==
Archibald was named for J. Burton Archibald, who was instrumental in bringing the railroad to the community.
