= Gilbert, Louisiana =

- Village
- Village of Gilbert
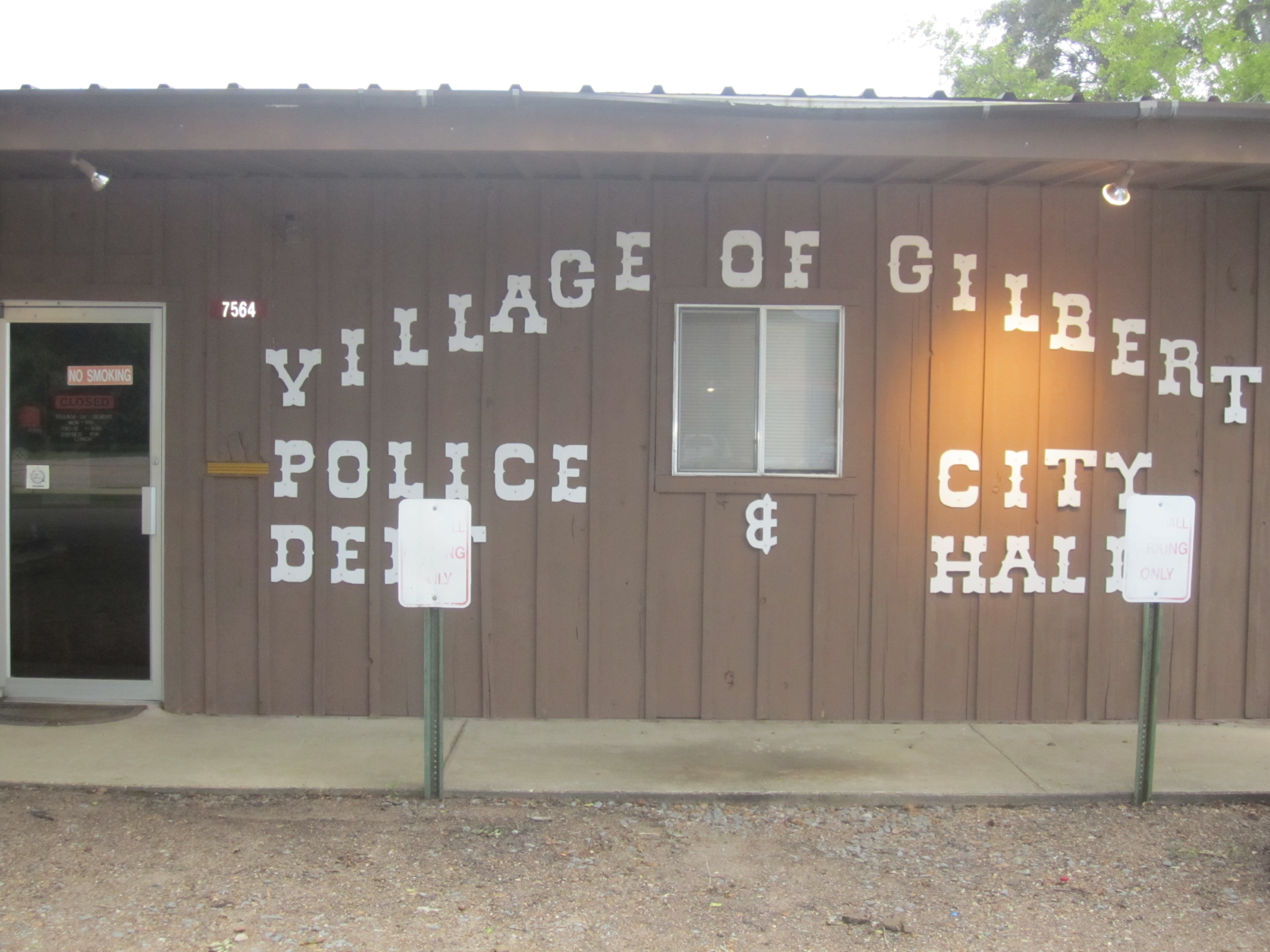
- Gilbert City Hall and Police Department

- Location of Gilbert in Franklin Parish, Louisiana.

- Location of Louisiana in the United States
- Coordinates: 32°03′03″N 91°39′24″W
- Country: United States
- State: Louisiana
- Parish: Franklin

Area
  - Total: 1.07 sq mi (2.76 km^{2})
  - Land: 1.05 sq mi (2.72 km^{2})
  - Water: 0.015 sq mi (0.04 km^{2})
- Elevation: 72 ft (22 m)

Population (2020)
  - Total: 449
  - Density: 428.2/sq mi (165.33/km^{2})
- Time zone: UTC-6 (CST)
  - Summer (DST): UTC-5 (CDT)
- Area code: 318
- FIPS code: 22-28940
- GNIS feature ID: 2407463

Gilbert is a village in Franklin Parish, Louisiana, United States. As of the 2020 census, Gilbert had a population of 449.

The Gilbert welcome sign describes the village as the home of U.S. Lieutenant General Claire Chennault.

== Geography ==
Gilbert is located in southern Franklin Parish along U.S. Route 425, which leads north 9.5 miles (15.3 km) to Winnsboro, the parish seat, and south 14 miles (23 km) to Sicily Island.

According to the United States Census Bureau, the village of Gilbert has a total area of 0.96 square miles (2.49 km^{2}), of which 0.94 square miles (2.44 km^{2}) is land and 0.02 square miles (0.04 km^{2}), or 1.77%, is water.

=== Climate ===
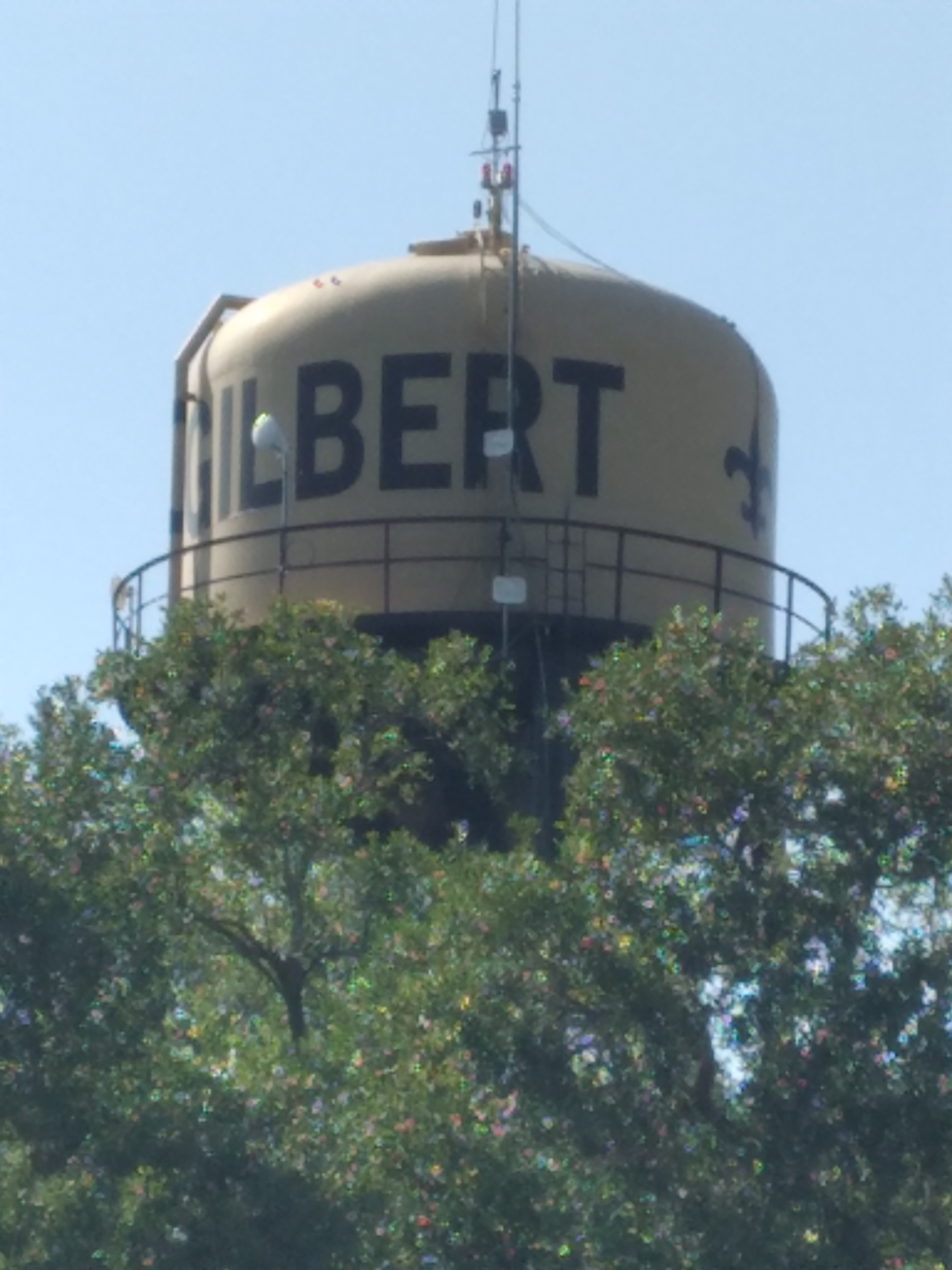
Gilbert Water Tower.

The climate in this area is characterized by hot, humid summers and generally mild to cool winters. According to the Köppen Climate Classification system, Gilbert has a humid subtropical climate, abbreviated "Cfa" on climate maps.

== Demographics ==
Historical population
Census	Pop.	Note	%±
1920	442		—
1930	496		12.2%
1940	428		−13.7%
1950	452		5.6%
1960	472		4.4%
1970	746		58.1%
1980	800		7.2%
1990	704		−12.0%
2000	561		−20.3%
2010	521		−7.1%
2020	449		−13.8%
2025 (est.)	436	▼	−2.9%
U.S. Decennial Census

As of the census of 2000, there were 561 people, 207 households, and 150 families residing in the village. The population density was 573.5 inhabitants per square mile (221.4/km^{2}). There were 231 housing units at an average density of 236.2 per square mile (91.2/km^{2}). The racial makeup of the village was 62.21% White, 35.83% African American, 0.18% Native American, 1.25% from other races, and 0.53% from two or more races. Hispanic or Latino of any race were 1.96% of the population.

There were 207 households, out of which 36.2% had children under the age of 18 living with them, 47.8% were married couples living together, 19.8% had a female householder with no husband present, and 27.1% were non-families. 24.6% of all households were made up of individuals, and 14.5% had someone living alone who was 65 years of age or older. The average household size was 2.71 and the average family size was 3.25.

In the village, the population was spread out, with 30.3% under the age of 18, 9.3% from 18 to 24, 26.4% from 25 to 44, 19.3% from 45 to 64, and 14.8% who were 65 years of age or older. The median age was 34 years. For every 100 females, there were 81.0 males. For every 100 females age 18 and over, there were 74.6 males.

The median income for a household in the village was $24,297, and the median income for a family was $26,667. Males had a median income of $24,000 versus $14,531 for females. The per capita income for the village was $15,270. About 21.7% of families and 22.4% of the population were below the poverty line, including 39.0% of those under age 18 and 14.1% of those age 65 or over.

== Notable people ==
- Willie L. Wilson businessman who in 2015 unsuccessfully ran for mayor of Chicago.
