= Fort Necessity, Louisiana =

- Unincorporated community
- Location within Louisiana Location within the United States
- Coordinates: 32°02′53″N 91°49′04″W
- Country: United States
- State: Louisiana
- Parish: Franklin
- Elevation: 69 ft (21 m)
- Time zone: UTC-6 (Central (CST))
  - Summer (DST): UTC-5 (CDT)
- ZIP code: 71243
- Area code: 318
- GNIS feature ID: 535049

Fort Necessity is an unincorporated community in Franklin Parish, Louisiana, United States. Its ZIP code is 71243.

The Franklin Parish School Board operates Fort Necessity School, a K-8 school. The sole high school in the parish is Franklin Parish High School, which formed in 2005 with the consolidations of Crowville and Winnsboro high schools.
