= Tensas River =

River in Louisiana

Tensas Bayou and Tensas River
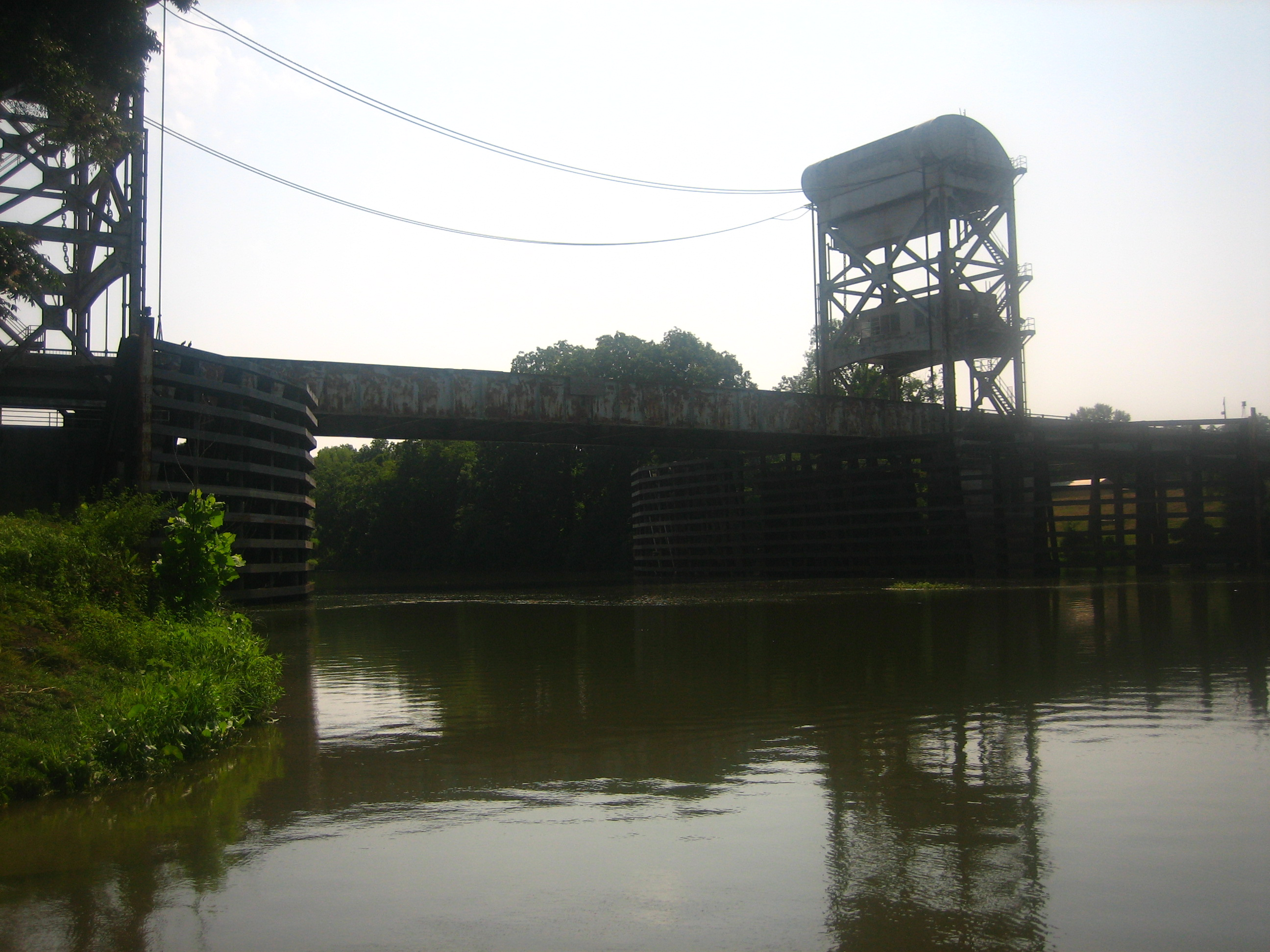
- Vertical lift bridge over the Tensas River at Clayton, Louisiana
- Tensas Bayou and Tensas River

Physical characteristics
- Source: Lake Providence (oxbow lake)
  - location: Lake Providence, Louisiana
  - coordinates: 32°48′45″N 91°11′31″W
- Mouth: Confluence with Ouachita River to form the Black River
  - location: Jonesville
  - coordinates: 31°37′54″N 91°48′20″W
- Length: 177 mi (285 km)
- Discharge
  - location: Tendall, LA (includes Bayou Macon)
  - average: 1,205 cu/ft. per sec.

The Tensas River /ˈtɛnsɔː/ is a river in Louisiana in the United States. The river, known as Tensas Bayou in its upper reaches, begins in East Carroll Parish in the northeast corner of the state and runs roughly southwest for 177 miles (285 km) more or less in parallel with the Mississippi River. The confluence of the Tensas and the Ouachita rivers, in Jonesville in Catahoula Parish, creates the Black River, not to be confused with Black Lake in Natchitoches Parish in north-central Louisiana.

For the twenty miles south of Interstate 20 between Delhi and Tallulah, the river winds its way through the Tensas River National Wildlife Refuge (in Madison, Franklin, and Tensas parishes), which was established in 1980 "for the preservation and development of environmental resources" about the river. In 1881 the Congress authorized the U.S. Army Corps of Engineers to improve the navigation by removing ordinary obstacles. The navigation work began at Dallas, a village on the stream in Madison Parish. The bottomland hardwood forest near the Tensas River is some of the remaining habitat of the Louisiana black bear.

The name Tensas is derived from the historic indigenous Taensa people. The first plantations along the Tensas River were established by settlers who had earlier plantations across the Mississippi River in the Natchez District.

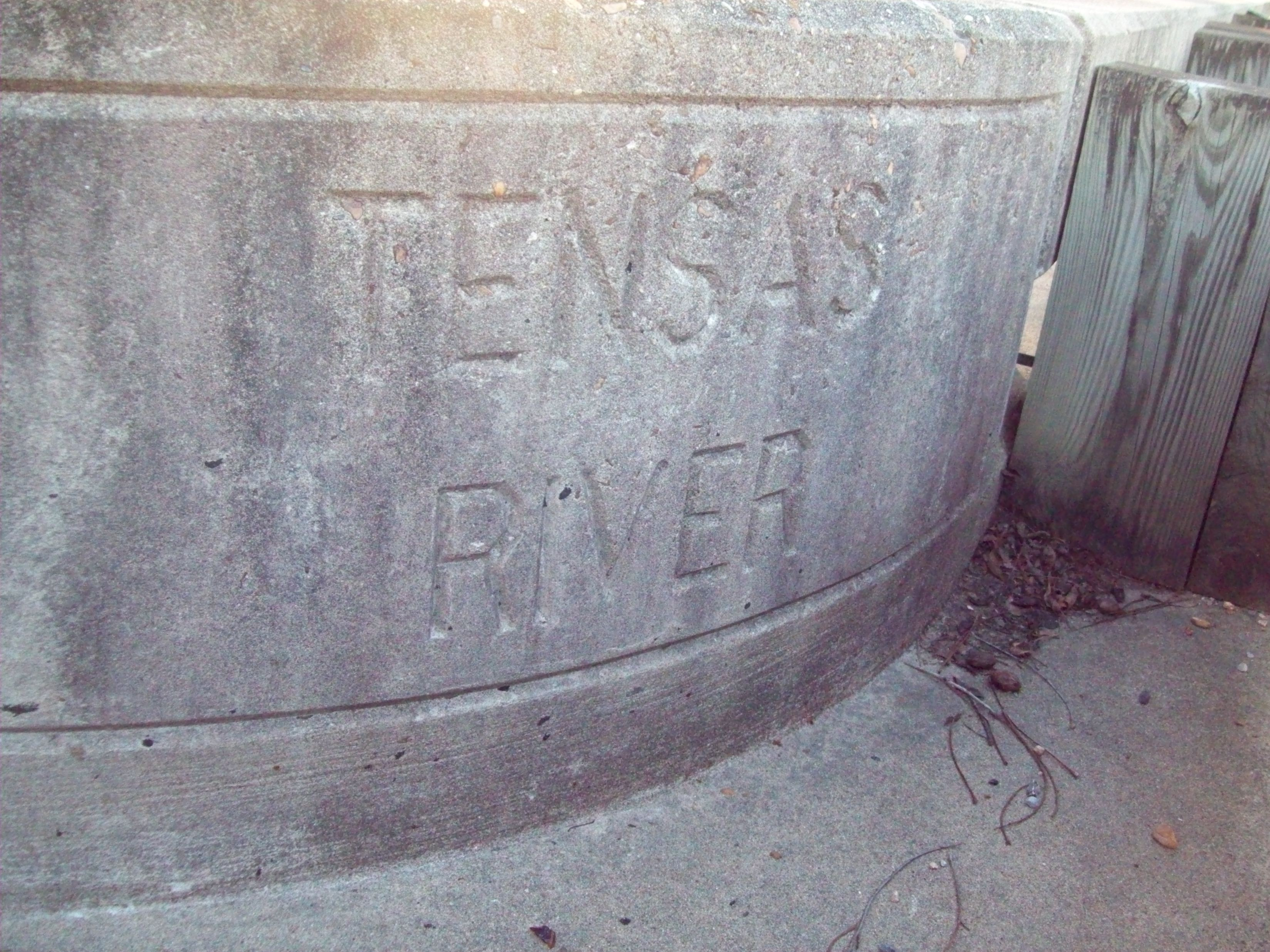
Bridge stamped with the Tensas River name

== See also ==
- List of Louisiana rivers
