= Crowville, Louisiana =

Unincorporated community in Franklin Parish, Louisiana

Coordinates: 32°14′27″N 91°35′24″W

Crowville is an unincorporated area with the only cluster of public services and commercial shopping within Ward 4, Franklin Parish, Louisiana. It serves as the center of commerce for all 11 villages. As such, Crowville services the network of families that live throughout the ward, a total of 3,911 persons and 1,087 households. Franklin Parish has 19,964 persons and 7,274 households. (as of 2020 census) Although unincorporated, Crowville has a post office with a ZIP code of 71230.

Crowville Township represents 11 villages within Ward 4 of Franklin Parish in northeast Louisiana at the crossroads of three state routes – Highways 17, 577, and 578.

Friends of Crowville aim to provide community-focused, quality-based educational programs and services throughout Franklin Parish.

Friends of Crowville seek to improve the overall quality of life for the residents and neighbors within Crowville and Franklin Parish; and to create a welcoming environment as guests visit from near and far.

Friends of Crowville mission is to enable and ensure quality community programs, education, and services are available throughout Franklin Parish.

== History ==
Crowville was settled in 1825. It was named for T. J. Crow, an early settler and storekeeper. Even as late as the 1830's, Indians were still in Franklin Parish and around the Crowville area. They were probably renegades from the mass movement of Indians to Oklahoma reservations. About 1831, families from various sections of Louisiana, neighboring states, and even northeastern states began to settle here. Naturally, farming was the chief occupation of these early settlers.
