= Winnsboro, Louisiana =

Winnsboro
- Town
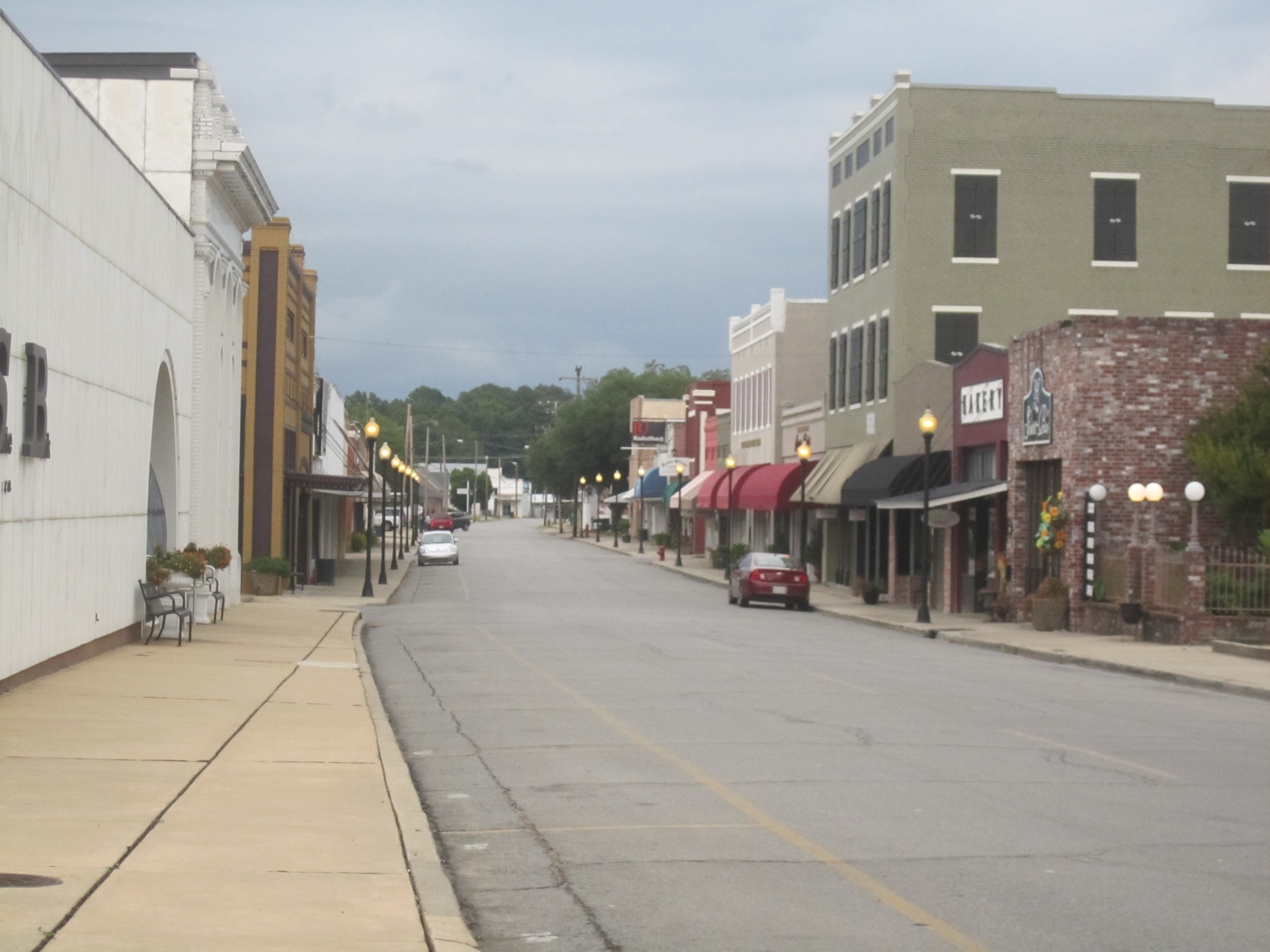
- Downtown Winnsboro
- Motto: The Stars and Stripes Capital of Louisiana
- Location of Winnsboro in Franklin Parish, Louisiana.

- Location of Louisiana in the United States
- Coordinates: 32°09′54″N 91°43′16″W
- Country: United States
- States: Louisiana
- Parish: Franklin

Government
  - Type: Mayor-council government
  - Mayor: Alice Wallace
  - Chief of Police: Tyrone Coleman

Area
  - Total: 4.06 sq mi (10.52 km^{2})
  - Land: 4.00 sq mi (10.35 km^{2})
  - Water: 0.062 sq mi (0.16 km^{2})
- Elevation: 75 ft (23 m)

Population (2020)
  - Total: 4,862
  - Density: 1,216.1/sq mi (469.54/km^{2})
- Demonym: Winnsboroian
- Time zone: UTC-6 (CST)
  - Summer (DST): UTC-5 (CDT)
- ZIP code: 71295
- Area code: 318
- FIPS code: 22-82495
- GNIS feature ID: 2405911
- Website: Official Website

Winnsboro is a town in, and the parish seat of Franklin Parish, Louisiana, United States. As of 2020, its population was 4,862.

== History ==
Franklin Parish was created on March 1, 1843, from portions of Ouachita, Catahoula, and Madison parishes through the efforts of Louisiana Senator John Winn. Land for a centrally located parish seat, Winnsborough (later Winnsboro), was purchased in 1844. It was designated as the parish seat of government in 1846 and incorporated on March 18, 1902.

Early Winnsboro City records show that the telephone came to Winnsboro in 1905; electricity in 1914; and water and sewer service in 1923. In 1924, a volunteer fire department was formed. Most of the community's streets were hard surfaced after 1950.

== Geography ==
According to the United States Census Bureau, the town has a total area of 4.14 square miles (10.73 km^{2}), of which 4.08 square miles (10.57 km^{2}) is land and 0.06 square miles (0.16 km^{2}), or 1.49%, is water.

=== Climate ===
Winnsboro has a humid subtropical climate (Köppen Cfa) with long, hot summers and short, mild winters.

Climate data for Winnsboro 5 SSE, Louisiana (1991–2020 normals, extremes 1893–present)
Month	Jan	Feb	Mar	Apr	May	Jun	Jul	Aug	Sep	Oct	Nov	Dec	Year
Record high °F (°C)	85 (29)	88 (31)	92 (33)	97 (36)	99 (37)	108 (42)	106 (41)	109 (43)	108 (42)	100 (38)	89 (32)	84 (29)	109 (43)
Mean maximum °F (°C)	75.0 (23.9)	78.3 (25.7)	82.8 (28.2)	87.7 (30.9)	92.5 (33.6)	95.9 (35.5)	99.0 (37.2)	99.7 (37.6)	97.2 (36.2)	91.1 (32.8)	83.4 (28.6)	77.9 (25.5)	100.8 (38.2)
Mean daily maximum °F (°C)	57.4 (14.1)	61.6 (16.4)	69.1 (20.6)	76.6 (24.8)	84.5 (29.2)	90.5 (32.5)	93.2 (34.0)	93.6 (34.2)	89.2 (31.8)	79.7 (26.5)	68.4 (20.2)	60.0 (15.6)	77.0 (25.0)
Daily mean °F (°C)	47.2 (8.4)	50.9 (10.5)	58.1 (14.5)	65.7 (18.7)	74.2 (23.4)	80.5 (26.9)	83.1 (28.4)	82.7 (28.2)	77.6 (25.3)	67.0 (19.4)	56.6 (13.7)	49.7 (9.8)	66.1 (18.9)
Mean daily minimum °F (°C)	36.9 (2.7)	40.3 (4.6)	47.1 (8.4)	54.8 (12.7)	63.9 (17.7)	70.5 (21.4)	73.0 (22.8)	71.8 (22.1)	66.0 (18.9)	54.2 (12.3)	44.8 (7.1)	39.4 (4.1)	55.2 (12.9)
Mean minimum °F (°C)	20.8 (−6.2)	25.8 (−3.4)	29.2 (−1.6)	37.7 (3.2)	48.9 (9.4)	60.8 (16.0)	66.1 (18.9)	64.0 (17.8)	51.2 (10.7)	37.1 (2.8)	27.9 (−2.3)	24.1 (−4.4)	19.3 (−7.1)
Record low °F (°C)	0 (−18)	−10 (−23)	17 (−8)	29 (−2)	38 (3)	39 (4)	51 (11)	48 (9)	35 (2)	23 (−5)	17 (−8)	5 (−15)	−10 (−23)
Average precipitation inches (mm)	5.55 (141)	5.37 (136)	5.28 (134)	6.25 (159)	4.62 (117)	4.22 (107)	4.50 (114)	4.31 (109)	3.60 (91)	4.68 (119)	4.43 (113)	5.46 (139)	58.27 (1,480)
Average snowfall inches (cm)	0.0 (0.0)	0.2 (0.51)	0.0 (0.0)	0.0 (0.0)	0.0 (0.0)	0.0 (0.0)	0.0 (0.0)	0.0 (0.0)	0.0 (0.0)	0.0 (0.0)	0.0 (0.0)	0.1 (0.25)	0.3 (0.76)
Average precipitation days (≥ 0.01 in)	8.8	7.7	8.2	6.6	7.4	8.5	7.7	6.7	5.1	5.8	6.9	8.5	87.5
Average snowy days (≥ 0.1 in)	0.1	0.1	0.0	0.0	0.0	0.0	0.0	0.0	0.0	0.0	0.0	0.0	0.2
Source: NOAAIEM

== Demographics ==
Historical population
Census	Pop.	Note	%±
1910	821		—
1920	1,176		43.2%
1930	1,965		67.1%
1940	2,834		44.2%
1950	3,655		29.0%
1960	4,437		21.4%
1970	5,349		20.6%
1980	5,921		10.7%
1990	5,755		−2.8%
2000	5,344		−7.1%
2010	4,910		−8.1%
2020	4,862		−1.0%
2025 (est.)	4,566	▼	−6.1%
U.S. Decennial Census

Winnsboro racial composition as of 2020
Race	Num.	Perc.
White (non-Hispanic)	1,073	22.07%
Black or African American (non-Hispanic)	3,538	72.77%
Native American	2	0.04%
Asian	23	0.47%
Other/Mixed	149	3.06%
Hispanic or Latino	77	1.58%

As of the 2020 United States census, there were 4,862 people, 1,504 households, and 1,007 families residing in the town.

== Economy ==
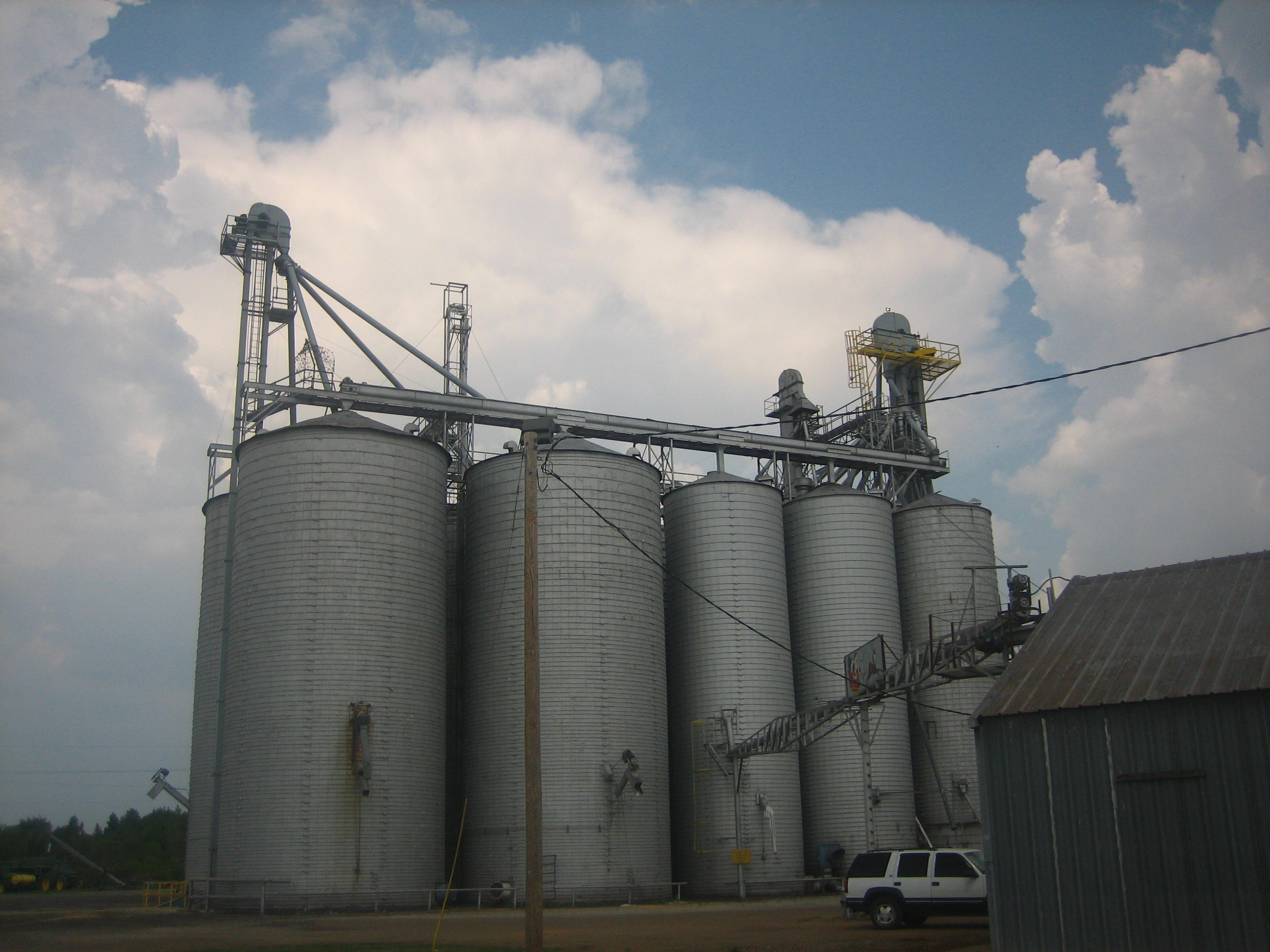
Grain elevator in Winnsboro

The economic base of Winnsboro consists of companies in the apparel, boat manufacturing, bottling and food products industries, aviation, healthcare, agriculture and agricultural related industries. There is a large grain elevator.

== Arts and culture ==
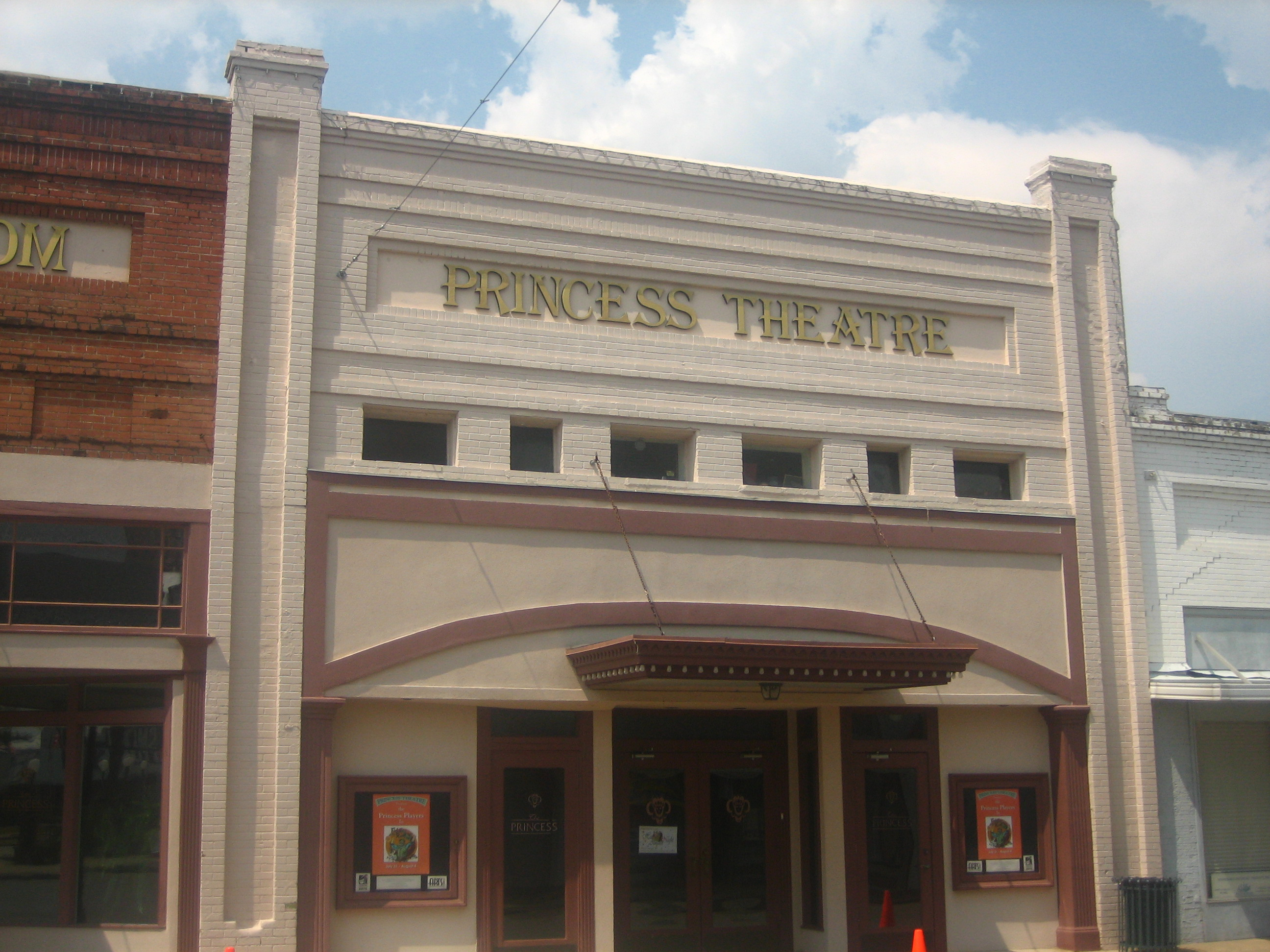
Princess Theatre

A post office, built in 1936, featured a New Deal program mural, Logging in Louisiana Swamps (1939), by Datus Ensign Myers. The building now contains the Old Post Office Museum.

The Princess Theatre was built in 1907, closed in 1988, and reopened as a live performance venue in 1994.

== Education ==
=== Public schools ===
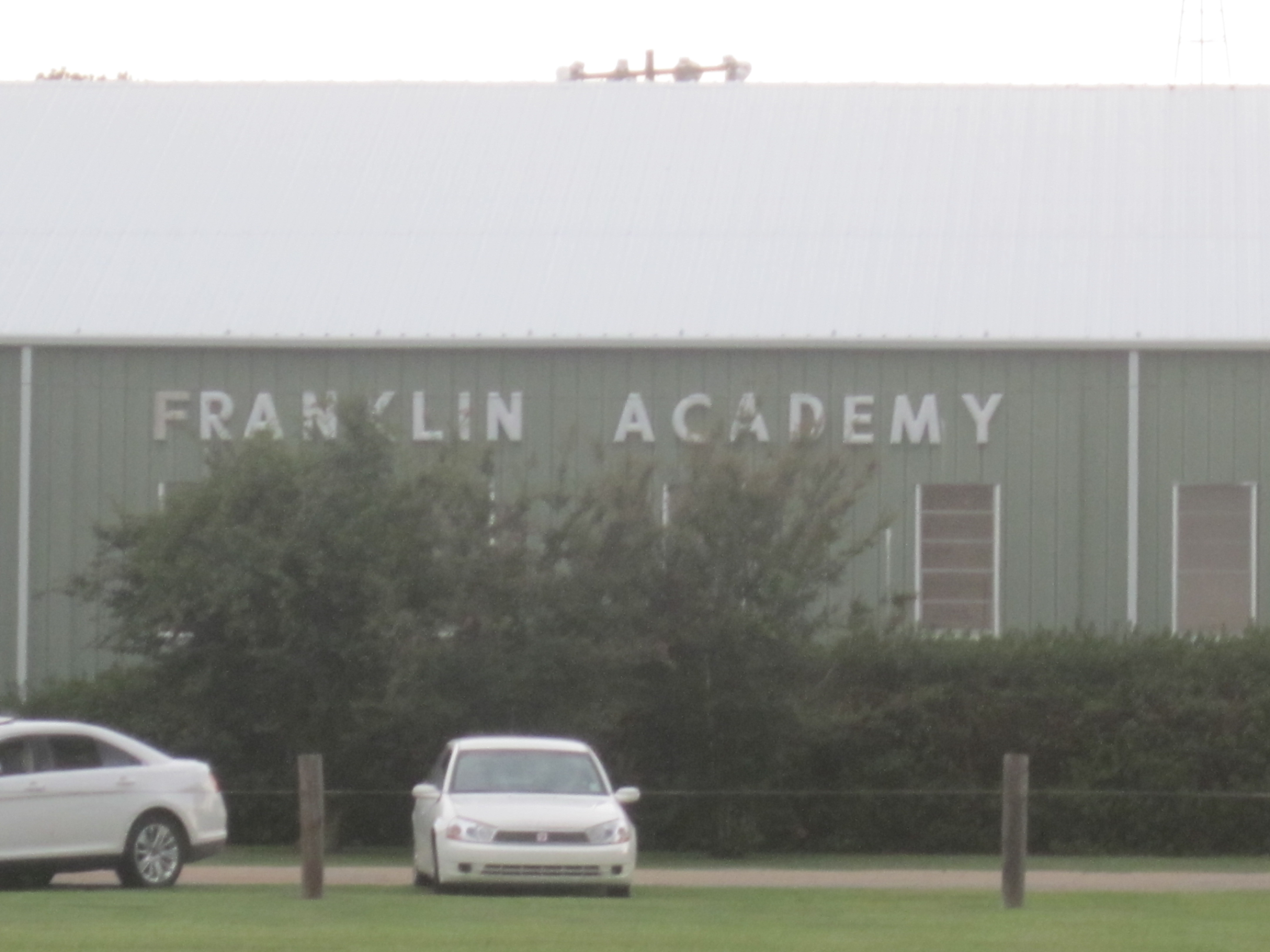
Franklin Academy in Winnsboro

Public education in Winnsboro is managed by the Franklin Parish School Board. There are two schools:

- Franklin Parish High School and Winnsboro Elementary School

Franklin Parish High formed in 2005 with the consolidations of Crowville and Winnsboro high schools.

=== Private schools ===
- Franklin Academy was founded in 1970.
- Family Community Christian School provides education from pre-kindergarten to 12th grade.

=== Higher education ===
Louisiana Technical College's Northeast Louisiana Campus is located in Winnsboro.

== Infrastructure ==
=== Healthcare ===
Winnsboro is the home of the only hospital located in Franklin Parish. Franklin Medical Center has been a part of Franklin Parish since 1970. The hospital is a 39-bed acute care facility. There are four health clinics owned by Franklin Medical Center located in Franklin and Tensas parishes.

=== National Guard ===
921st Engineer Company (Horizontal), part of the 528th Engineer Battalion which belongs to the 225th Engineer Brigade, is located in Winnsboro.

== Notable people ==
- Fred Carter, Jr., rock and roll guitarist and singer
- Ralph E. King, physician and state senator from 1944 to 1952 and 1956 to 1960
- Caleb Martin, American football player
- Anthony McFarland, professional football player and ESPN commentator
- John Moffitt, 2004 Olympic silver medalist
- Woody Sauldsberry, NBA player
- Chet D. Traylor, Associate Justice on the Louisiana Supreme Court
- Calvin A. H. Waller, Lieutenant General, U. S. Army; Operation Desert Storm
- Sammy White, professional football player
