= Louisiana Highway 17 =

State highway in Louisiana, United States

Louisiana Highway 17

- Route of LA 17 highlighted in red

Route information
- Maintained by Louisiana DOTD
- Length: 66.531 mi (107.071 km)
- Existed: 1955 renumbering–present

Major junctions
- South end: US 425 / LA 4 / LA 15 / LA 130 in Winnsboro
- I-20 in Delhi; US 80 in Delhi; LA 2 in Oak Grove
- North end: AR 159 at Arkansas state line in Kilbourne

Location
- Country: United States
- State: Louisiana
- Parishes: Franklin, Richland, West Carroll

Highway system
- Louisiana State Highway System; Interstate; US; State; Scenic
← LA 16	→ LA 18
← SR 15	SR 16	→ SR 17

Louisiana Highway 17 (LA 17) is a state highway located in northeastern Louisiana. It runs 66.53 miles (107.07 km) in a north–south direction from the junction of U.S. Highway 425 (US 425), LA 4, LA 15, and LA 130 in Winnsboro to the Arkansas state line at Kilbourne.

LA 17 traverses a mostly rural area on an alignment roughly midway between the parallel US 65 and US 425 corridors. Heading northeast from Winnsboro, the seat of Franklin Parish, LA 17 connects a number of tiny communities located on the west side of Bayou Macon. After crossing into Richland Parish, the highway passes through the town of Delhi and straightens to follow alongside the abandoned right-of-way of the Missouri Pacific Railroad. The northern half of LA 17 functions as the main north–south highway through West Carroll Parish, connecting the villages of Epps, Pioneer, Forest, and Kilbourne, as well as the parish seat of Oak Grove.

In Delhi, LA 17 connects with both Interstate 20 (I-20) and US 80, providing access to the ancient Native American earthworks at Poverty Point State Historic Site and National Monument. This site is located along LA 134 just east of Epps and was designated as a UNESCO World Heritage Site in 2014.

LA 17 was created in the 1955 Louisiana Highway renumbering, replacing the former State Route 16, one of the original 98 state highway designations assigned in 1921.

== Route description ==
=== Winnsboro to Delhi ===
From the south, LA 17 begins at a junction of five numbered highways located at the four-way intersection of Front Street, Kinloch Street, and Taylor Avenue in Winnsboro. US 425/LA 15 passes through this intersection on Front Street, the city's main thoroughfare, en route to Monroe on the north. To the south, US 425/LA 15 travels toward Natchez, Mississippi running briefly concurrent with westbound LA 4. Opposite the southern terminus of LA 17, LA 130 begins and heads west on Taylor Avenue toward Liddieville. From this junction, LA 17 heads east on Kinloch Street, an undivided two-lane thoroughfare, running concurrent with eastbound LA 4. After a few blocks, the highway makes a zigzag onto Main Street and widens to an undivided four-lane highway with a center turning lane.

Just outside the city limits, the roadway curves to the northeast while LA 4 turns off to the southeast toward Newellton. Returning to two-lane capacity, LA 17 proceeds through rural Franklin Parish. After 8.3 miles (13.4 km), the highway passes through the small community of Crowville and intersects several minor state highways, including LA 577, which connects to Baskin on the west. Over the remaining 12.9 miles (20.8 km) in Franklin Parish, LA 17 continues northeast through rural farmland and intersects several more minor highways, including LA 132 to Mangham.

=== Delhi to Arkansas state line ===
After crossing into Richland Parish, LA 17 passes Delhi Municipal Airport and enters the town of Delhi. Widening to four lanes, the highway passes through a diamond interchange with I-20, connecting with Monroe to the west and Vicksburg, Mississippi to the east. Traveling through the center of town on Broadway Street, LA 17 crosses the Kansas City Southern Railway (KCS) line at grade and intersects US 80 (1st Street). North of town, LA 17 intersects LA 854 and passes Poverty Point Reservoir State Park. After passing through the tiny community of Warden, LA 17 crosses into West Carroll Parish at Mitchiner and a junction with LA 877.

In West Carroll Parish, LA 17 proceeds northeast through the village of Epps. A junction with LA 134 here leads to the ancient Native American earthworks of the Poverty Point State Historic Site and National Monument, one of only 23 UNESCO World Heritage Sites in the United States. Over the next 18 miles (29 km), LA 17 passes through the rural communities of Darnell, Pioneer, and Forest before reaching the town of Oak Grove, the seat of West Carroll Parish. LA 17 heads north into town on Constitution Avenue and widens to an undivided four-lane highway with a center turning lane. In the center of Oak Grove, LA 17 intersects LA 2 (Main Street), connecting with Lake Providence to the east and Bastrop to the west. These are the seats of neighboring East Carroll and Morehouse parishes, respectively.

North of Oak Grove, LA 17 narrows to an undivided two-lane highway once again. After passing the tiny rural communities of Terry and Chickasaw, the highway enters the village of Kilbourne. Traveling on Kilbourne Avenue, LA 17 reaches its final junction, LA 585 (Louisiana Avenue). The highway ends 0.5 miles (0.80 km) later at the Arkansas state line, where the road continues towards Eudora, Arkansas as Arkansas Highway 159 (AR 159).

=== Route classification and data ===
LA 17 is classified by the Louisiana Department of Transportation and Development (La DOTD) as an urban minor arterial in the Winnsboro area and as a rural minor arterial otherwise. Daily traffic volume in 2013 peaked at 9,800 vehicles in Winnsboro and 10,300 at the I-20 interchange in Delhi. Most of the route averaged under 4,000 vehicles daily with a low of 1,930 reported north of Epps. The posted speed limit is generally 55 mph (90 km/h) in rural areas, reduced to between 30 mph (50 km/h) and 40 mph (65 km/h) through town.

== History ==
=== Pre-1955 route numbering ===
State Route 16
- Location: Winnsboro–Kilbourne
- Length: 67.2 mi (108.1 km)
- Existed: 1921–1955

In the original Louisiana Highway system in use between 1921 and 1955, LA 17 was designated as State Route 16. It was created in 1921 by an act of the state legislature as one of the first 98 state highway routes.

Route 16. Beginning at Arkansas State line at Kilbourne, through Oak Grove, Delhi, to Winnsboro.

— 1921 legislative route description

The western terminus of Route 16 was originally located just outside Winnsboro at the present junction of LA 4/LA 17 and LA 864. Route 15, which retained its number in the 1955 Louisiana Highway renumbering, followed the path of current LA 864 and LA 4/LA 17 through town at this time. In the early 1940s, Front Street was completed along the now-abandoned Missouri Pacific Railroad line, streamlining the path of Route 15 through Winnsboro. The Route 16 designation was then extended west into town to maintain its junction with Route 15.

The entirety of Route 16 was surfaced with gravel by the mid-1920s. In 1930, a short section of the route through Oak Grove was hard-surfaced. Paving was completed south from Oak Grove to Delhi in 1932 and north from Oak Grove to Kilbourne in 1936. The remainder of Route 16 between Winnsboro and Delhi was paved in 1941.

=== Post-1955 route history ===
LA 17 was created in 1955 as a direct renumbering of former Route 16.

La 17—From a junction with La 15 at or near Winnsboro through or near Crowville, Delhi and Oak Grove to the Arkansas State Line near Kilbourne.

— 1955 legislative route description

Since the 1955 renumbering, very few changes have been made to the alignment of LA 17. During the late 1980s, a curve was smoothed out between LA 132 and the Franklin–West Carroll parish line. McDowell Road, a local road, is a remnant of the original alignment there. About this same time, a more significant improvement was carried out that streamlined the route through Oak Grove. The original route followed the Missouri Pacific Railroad to the center of town then made a zigzag east onto Main Street and north onto Briggs Street to rejoin the railroad line and the current alignment. After the abandonment of the MoPac line, the four-lane Constitution Avenue alignment was constructed upon its right-of-way.

== Major intersections ==
Parish	Location	mi	km	Destinations	Notes
Franklin	Winnsboro	0.000	0.000	US 425 / LA 4 west / LA 15 (Front Street) – Monroe, Natchez LA 130 west (Taylor Avenue) – Liddieville	Southern terminus of LA 17; eastern terminus of LA 130; south end of LA 4 concurrency
Franklin	Winnsboro	0.558	0.898	LA 865 (Pine Street)	Southern terminus of LA 865 (northern section)
Franklin	Winnsboro	0.989	1.592	LA 864 (Loop Road)	Northern terminus of LA 864
Franklin		1.510	2.430	LA 4 east – Newellton	North end of LA 4 concurrency
Franklin	Bushes	7.620	12.263	LA 555	Northern terminus of LA 555
Franklin	Crowville	9.779	15.738	LA 577 west	South end of LA 577 concurrency
Franklin	Crowville	9.862	15.871	LA 578	Northern terminus of LA 578
Franklin	Crowville	10.046	16.167	LA 577 east	North end of LA 577 concurrency
Franklin	Longview	11.341	18.252	LA 861	Western terminus of LA 861
Franklin		14.705	23.665	LA 860	
Franklin	Bakers	17.300	27.842	LA 858	Eastern terminus of LA 858
Franklin		21.539	34.664	LA 132 west – Mangham	Eastern terminus of LA 132
Richland	Delhi	25.223– 25.368	40.592– 40.826	I-20 – Monroe, Vicksburg	Exit 153 on I-20
Richland	Delhi	26.317	42.353	US 80 (1st Street) – Tallulah, Monroe	
Richland		27.830	44.788	LA 854	Eastern terminus of LA 854
Richland	Warden	32.154	51.747	LA 855	Eastern terminus of LA 855
Richland–West Carroll parish line	Mitchiner	35.349	56.889	LA 877	Western terminus of LA 877
West Carroll	Epps	36.927	59.428	LA 134 – Oak Ridge, Lake Providence	To Poverty Point State Historic Site
West Carroll	Darnell	42.195	67.906	LA 577	
West Carroll	Pioneer	46.482	74.806	LA 588 west (Cherry Street)	South end of LA 588 concurrency
West Carroll		47.407	76.294	LA 588 east	North end of LA 588 concurrency
West Carroll	Forest	50.064	80.570	LA 582	
West Carroll	Forest	50.534	81.327	LA 589 east	South end of LA 589 concurrency
West Carroll	Forest	50.708	81.607	LA 589 west	North end of LA 589 concurrency
West Carroll	Oak Grove	55.542	89.386	LA 2 (Main Street) – Lake Providence, Bastrop	
West Carroll		60.033	96.614	LA 586	Eastern terminus of LA 586
West Carroll		64.449	103.721	LA 880	Western terminus of LA 880
West Carroll	Kilbourne	66.034	106.271	LA 585 (Louisiana Avenue)	
West Carroll	Kilbourne	66.531	107.071	AR 159 north – Eudora	Northern terminus; continuation in Arkansas
1.000 mi = 1.609 km; 1.000 km = 0.621 mi: Concurrency terminus
