= New Light =

New Light, new light, New Lights or new lights may refer to:

- New Light, North Carolina
- New Light, Richland Parish, Louisiana
- New Light (song), a song by John Mayer
- New Light (EP), an EP by the band Moving Mountains
- Old and New Lights, a Protestant concept

== See also ==
- Nai Roshni (disambiguation)
