= Start, Louisiana =

- Census-designated place
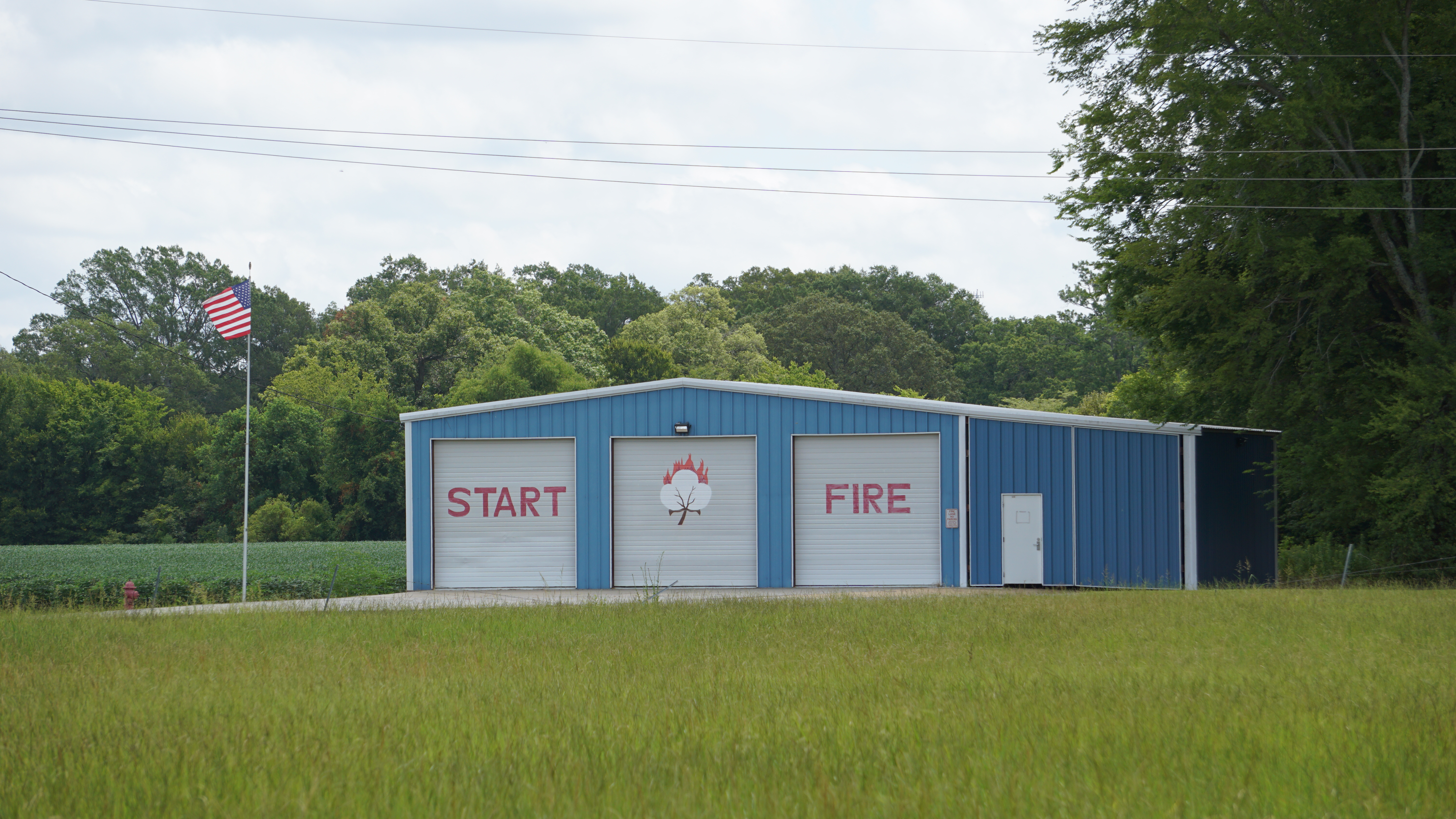
- The Start Fire Department's Station Two

- Location of Start in Richland Parish, Louisiana
- Coordinates: 32°29′11″N 91°51′33″W
- Country: United States
- State: Louisiana
- Parish: Richland

Area
  - Total: 3.61 sq mi (9.34 km^{2})
  - Land: 3.52 sq mi (9.11 km^{2})
  - Water: 0.089 sq mi (0.23 km^{2})
- Elevation: 75 ft (23 m)

Population (2020)
  - Total: 982
  - Density: 279/sq mi (107.8/km^{2})
- Time zone: UTC−6 (CST)
  - Summer (DST): UTC−5 (CDT)
- ZIP codes: 71279
- Area code: 318
- FIPS code: 22-73010
- GNIS feature ID: 2586713

Start is a census-designated place in Richland Parish, Louisiana, United States. The population was 982 at the 2020 census, up from 905 in 2010.

== History ==
Prior to the creation of Richland Parish in 1868, the area now recognized as Start was situated in Morehouse Parish. After the new parish of Richland was formed, this area was often referred to as Ward 3, Crew Lake, Charleston, or Wynn Island. Start officially derived its name in 1918 when the United States Postal Service officially accepted it as the new name of the community. Charleston was originally submitted, but this name was rejected. The owner of a small mercantile store in Start, James M. Morgan, was granted permission to receive mail at his store, but the area would need a permanent name. James Morgan's daughter, Rachel, suggested that they name the community Start, because they were making a new start. This name was officially approved by the USPS on September 7, 1918. Louisiana Public Broadcasting aired a segment in 2006 on Louisiana: The State We're In, detailing how the community came up with the name of Start. In the summer of 1923, the Richland Parish School Board passed a motion to advertise for bids on a new high school building, to be known once constructed as Start High School. Marie Robinson was the sole graduate of Start's first graduating class, held in the spring of 1925.

Up until November 29, 1930 mail was continually delivered to both Start and Crew Lake, (located directly west of Start.) After this date, Crew Lake ceased to also serve as a post office location, and the primary hub for mail became Start.

In 1937, Congressman Newt V. Mills announced that the Resettlement Administration, (a New Deal program initiated under President Franklin D. Roosevelt), had purchased the 3,000-acre Millsaps Plantation. This program provided for approximately 40 new families to move into the Start community.

== Geography ==
Start is located near the Boeuf River to the east and Lafourche Diversion Canal to its west. A small tributary called Crew Lake flows through the community.

== Demographics ==
Historical population
Census	Pop.	Note	%±
2010	905		—
2020	982		8.5%
U.S. Decennial Census

Start first appeared as a census designated place in the 2010 U.S. census.

=== 2020 census ===
As of the census of 2020, there were 982 people living in the CPD, for a population density of 279.0 people per square mile (107.8/km^{2}). There were 426 housing units. The racial makeup of the CPD was 90.3% White, 6.0% Black or African American, 0.1% Native American, 0.0% Asian, 0.0% Pacific Islander, 0.8% from some other race, and 2.7% from two or more races. 1.3% of the population were Hispanic or Latino of any race.

There were 555 households, out of which 37.3% had children under the age of 18 living with them, 35.1% were married couples living together, 6.3% had a male householder with no spouse present, and 29.9% had a female householder with no spouse present. 18.0% of all households were made up of individuals, and 11.5% were someone living alone who was 65 years of age or older. The average household size was 1.66, and the average family size was 2.04.

12.0% of the CPD's population were under the age of 18, 72.8% were 18 to 64, and 15.2% were 65 years of age or older. The median age was 47.5. For every 100 females, there were 100.0 males.

According to the U.S. Census American Community Survey, for the period 2016-2020 the estimated median annual income for a family in the CPD was $66,667. About 31.1% of the population were living below the poverty line, including 44.1% of those under age 18 and 45.7% of those age 65 or over. About 46.7% of the population were employed, and 20.4% had a bachelor's degree or higher.

== Infrastructure ==
- I-20, Exit 132
- US 80
- Louisiana Highway 133

The Kansas City Southern Railway also passes through the community, running east and west.

== Education ==
Start Elementary School, operated by the Richland Parish School Board, is a public school for pre-kindergarten through eight grade.

== Notable people ==
- Julia Letlow (born 1981), member of the United States House of Representatives, elected in a special election to fill her husband's term
- Luke Letlow (1979―2020), former member-elect to the United States House of Representatives who died of COVID-19 in December 2020.
