= Sacksonia, Louisiana =

- Unincorporated community
- Location within Louisiana Location within the United States
- Coordinates: 32°28′00″N 91°36′07″W
- Country: United States
- State: Louisiana
- Parish: Richland
- Elevation: 82 ft (25 m)
- Time zone: UTC-6 (Central (CST))
  - Summer (DST): UTC-5 (CDT)
- Area code: 318
- GNIS feature ID: 543634

Sacksonia is an unincorporated community in Richland Parish, Louisiana, United States. The community is located 6.4 miles (10.30 kilometres) W of Delhi, Louisiana.

== Name origins ==
The community is named after Benjamin Simon “B.S.” Sacksionie a prominent businessman and local proprietor that operated a saw mill near Dunn, Louisiana. Sacksionie and his colleague named Jacob P. Wolff established the colony around 1908 and operated the saw mill using immigrant labor. The exports of lumber to Europe was lucrative and a train depot was built to expedite trade. The train depot was named Sacksionie and then in 1933 USGS maps were updated using the modern name of Sacksonia.

== Sacksonia Gas Field ==
A large natural gas deposit is located in the area known as the Sacksonia Gas Field.
