= Four Forks, Richland Parish, Louisiana =

Unincorporated community in Louisiana

Four Forks, Louisiana
- Unincorporated community
- Location within Louisiana Location within the United States
- Coordinates: 32°19′13″N 91°52′10″W
- Country: United States
- State: Louisiana
- Parish: Richland
- Elevation: 69 ft (21 m)
- Time zone: UTC-6 (Central (CST))
  - Summer (DST): UTC-5 (CDT)
- Area code: 318
- GNIS feature ID: 541251

Four Forks is an unincorporated community located in Richland Parish, Louisiana, United States. The community is located 5 miles (8.05 kilometres) west of Mangham, Louisiana.
