= Gilleyville, Louisiana =

Unincorporated community in Louisiana

- Unincorporated community
- Location within Louisiana Location within the United States
- Coordinates: 32°18′11″N 91°53′40″W
- Country: United States
- State: Louisiana
- Parish: Richland
- Elevation: 72 ft (22 m)
- Time zone: UTC-6 (Central (CST))
  - Summer (DST): UTC-5 (CDT)
- Area code: 318
- GNIS feature ID: 543236

Gilleyville is an unincorporated community in Richland Parish, Louisiana, United States. The community is located 6.5 miles (10.46 kilometres) west of Mangham, Louisiana.
