= New Light, Richland Parish, Louisiana =

New Light, Louisiana
- Unincorporated community
- Location within Louisiana Location within the United States
- Coordinates: 32°15′41″N 91°47′01″W
- Country: United States
- State: Louisiana
- Parish: Richland
- Elevation: 72 ft (22 m)
- Time zone: UTC-6 (Central (CST))
  - Summer (DST): UTC-5 (CDT)
- Area code: 318
- GNIS feature ID: 537594
- FIPS code: 22-54070

New Light is an unincorporated community in Richland Parish, Louisiana, United States. The community is located 3.5 miles (5.63 kilometres) south of Mangham, Louisiana.

== Name origin ==
In a 1982 interview with Lula and Leo Cheek, it was speculated that the name of the community is symbolic and has biblical connotations.
