= Jonesburg, Louisiana =

- Unincorporated community
- Location within Louisiana Location within the United States
- Coordinates: 32°31′31″N 91°45′24″W
- Country: United States
- State: Louisiana
- Parish: Richland
- Elevation: 85 ft (26 m)
- Time zone: UTC-6 (Central (CST))
  - Summer (DST): UTC-5 (CDT)
- Area code: 318
- GNIS feature ID: 541117

Jonesburg is an unincorporated community in Richland Parish, Louisiana, United States. The community is located 18 miles (28.97 kilometres) E of Monroe, Louisiana.
