= Robert Max Ross =

- Born: August 5, 1933; Baskin; Franklin Parish, Louisiana
- Died: September 15, 2009 (aged 76); Baton Rouge, Louisiana
- Occupations: Second lieutenant in the United States Air Force; Major in the Air Force Reserves
- Spouse: Barbara Faye Paul "Bobbie" Ross
- Children: Cathy Ross Mitchell Kenneth Ross; Tricia Ross Guidry Christy Ross Maier
- Parent(s): Robert States Ross; Ruby Seymour Ross Clingham

Robert Max Ross (August 5, 1933 – September 15, 2009) was a Republican activist and a candidate for numerous statewide and local offices who resided in Mangham in northeastern Louisiana. He was among the earliest advocates for the Republican political movement at a time when no GOP candidate had been elected statewide in more than a century. He ran as one of two candidates in the Republican primaries for governor in 1972 and Louisiana's 5th congressional district seat in 1974. After Louisiana adopted the jungle primary system, Ross qualified again for governor in 1983 and also the United States Senate in 1984. He additionally ran for the Louisiana State Senate as well as mayor of Mangham during other election years.

== Biography ==
External image
- Robert Max Ross, pictured here, was the lone Republican challenger to Dave Treen in the 1971 Republican Gubernatorial Primary Election

Ross was born in Baskin in Franklin Parish to Robert States Ross and the former Ruby Seymour (1911-2002), and resided in Mangham in neighboring Richland Parish. In 1956, he obtained a Bachelor of Science degree, with a major in agriculture, from Louisiana State University in Baton Rouge. He was a 1962 graduate of the United States Air Force's Squadron Officer School at Maxwell Air Force Base in Montgomery, Alabama. He was decorated with the Bronze Star Medal at McChord Air Force Base for services while engaged in military operations against the Viet Cong in 1962.

== Political activism and campaigns ==
When Ross first qualified to run for any political office in 1974, Louisiana had been a one-party state for more than a century. Less than 1 percent of the state's voters were registered as Republicans. Following the end of Reconstruction, the Democratic Party had served as the only party to elect officials to public office at nearly every level of government except for U.S. President.

=== 1971–1972 Gubernatorial race ===
Louisiana has only had one contested Republican gubernatorial primary in its electoral history, the election of 1971–1972. Republicans did not usually appear on the ballot in previous elections dating back to Reconstruction. Ross announced his campaign for the 1972 gubernatorial election in February 1971, the first announced Republican to enter the race. When qualifying ended in August 1971, eighteen Democrats had qualified, and only two Republicans, Ross and Dave Treen, then a lawyer from Metairie in Jefferson Parish. Treen, had run unsuccessfully for the United States House of Representatives from suburban New Orleans in 1962, 1964, and 1968. in the gubernatorial primary, Treen carried the support of the party leadership, including GOP chairman Charles deGravelles, of Lafayette, while Ross was the "outsider." At the time 98.6 percent of state voters still registered as a Democrat. Ross was publicly critical of the leaders of the Louisiana Republican Party, and vowed to continue his fight for open elections within the party, as opposed to nominees being chosen by those in leadership. Ross also publicly criticized Treen by noting Treen had once been a Democrat, whereas Ross had been a lifelong Republican. Nonetheless, with party leaders heavily backing Treen, as well as support from President Richard Nixon and Governor Ronald Reagan of California, Ross stopped active campaigning for the nomination but did not officially remove his name from the ballot.

On Saturday, November 6, 1971, Treen defeated Ross overwhelmingly, 9,732 votes (92 percent) and 839 )8 percent) for Ross. Treen would go on to lose to Democrat Edwin Edwards in the general election held on February 1, 1972, but Republicans had their best showing in more than a century, as Treen polled 42.8 percent of the vote and carried many parishes in North Louisiana.

Despite Ross' poor showing, he and Treen remain the only Republicans to ever participate in a closed Republican gubernatorial statewide primary in Louisiana.

Treen was elected to the United States House of Representatives representing greater New Orleans the next year, the first Republican to represent Louisiana in Congress since Hamilton D. Coleman left office from Louisiana's 2nd congressional district in 1891. Republicans did not field a candidate in the election of 1975, and the new Louisiana Constitution of 1974 eliminated closed primary elections, creating the current jungle primary for future elections.

=== 1972 Louisiana State Senate race ===
Despite having also been a candidate for governor, Ross additionally filed as a Republican candidate for the Louisiana State Senate seat held by veteran Democratic incumbent Charles M. Brown, of Tallulah, Louisiana. In 1972, Louisiana had not elected a Republican to the Louisiana State Senate throughout the entire 20th century. Ross received more than five thousand votes in the general election but was still soundly defeated by Brown.

=== 1974 U.S. House of Representatives race ===
In 1974, Ross qualified as a candidate for the Republican congressional primary as a challenger to longtime U.S. Representative Otto Passman, in Louisiana's 5th congressional district. Passman was first elected in 1946, and had previously never faced a Republican challenger on the general election ballot. Ross was defeated by fellow Republican Ross Patrick Shirah (born August 6, 1940), then from Monroe, in the intra-party challenge to Passman. In 1974, there were fewer than 5,000 Republicans registered in the 5th District of Louisiana but more than 216,000 Democrats. Shirah eventually dropped out, and Passman was re-elected by default.

=== 1975 Louisiana State Senate race ===
In 1975, Ross qualified as the lone Republican candidate for the Louisiana State Senate in District 33. With the adoption of Louisiana's new jungle primary, Ross did not advance to the runoff.

=== 1983 Gubernatorial race ===
In 1983, he filed for the nonpartisan blanket primary for governor and polled a minuscule 7,625 ballots. The other Republican candidate that year was David Treen, by then the embattled incumbent governor, who failed in his bid for a second term. Treen received 588,508 ballots (36.9 percent), but the easy winner was the Democratic choice, former Governor Edwin Edwards, with 1,006,561 votes (63.1 percent). Ross challenged his former Republican rival in part because he believed Treen had not represented "true Republican philosophies." Treen was defeated in a landslide by former Governor Edwards. Ross received less than 1 percent of the vote, or 7,777 total votes statewide. Ross received his greatest number of votes in Lafayette Parish.

=== 1984 U.S. Senate race ===
In July 1984, Ross challenged the two-term incumbent U.S. Senator J. Bennett Johnston Jr. of Shreveport. Several minor candidates filed against Johnston in the jungle primary but none made a showing. He was defeated by Johnston and, 838,181 votes (85.7 percent) to 86,546 votes (8.9 percent) for Ross.

=== 1986 U.S. Senate race ===
When U.S. Senator Russell B. Long retired, Ross entered the primary for the open U.S. Senate seat in September 1986, but was soundly defeated in the field of fourteen candidates. Republican U.S. Representative Henson Moore of Louisiana's 6th congressional district faced Democratic Representative John Breaux of Louisiana's 7th congressional district. He resided in Crowley in Acadia Parish. Breaux went on to defeat Moore by 77,000 votes and held the seat for eighteen years until he retired in January 2005 and was succeeded by the Republican David Vitter.

== Death and legacy ==
Ross died from a lengthy illness at the Baton Rouge home of his daughter, Cathy Ross Mitchell, and her husband, Patrick Mitchell. In addition, he was survived by his wife of fifty-one years, the former Barbara Faye "Bobbie" Paul (born February 1940), originally from Simmesport in Pointe Coupee Parish; a son, Kenneth Ross and wife, Lottie Fields Ross, of Covington in St. Tammany Parish, and two other daughters, Tricia Ross Guidry and husband, Ricky Guidry, of Lake Charles, and Christy Ross Maier of Montgomery, Alabama; nine grandchildren, two sisters, Maxine Smart of Vidalia in Concordia Parish, and Terry Jean Agnew and husband, Raymond Agnew, of Monroe. Ross's late brother, Jimmy Dale Ross, was a Republican leader in Jonesville in Catahoula Parish. He also had a third sister, the late June Ross Rowland of Alto in Richland Parish.

Bennie McLain Hixon (1923-2014), an educator and former principal at Mangham High School, said that Ross may have been the first Republican in Mangham or at at least the first well-known member of his party there. "He helped break ground for the growth of the Republican Party in Richland Parish," said Hixon, a Democrat and the author of The History of Mangham and the Big Creek-Boeuf River to 1940.
