= Bardel, Louisiana =

Unincorporated community in Louisiana

- Unincorporated community
- Location within Louisiana Location within the United States
- Coordinates: 32°33′04″N 91°45′27″W
- Country: United States
- State: Louisiana
- Parish: Richland
- Elevation: 75 ft (23 m)
- Time zone: UTC-6 (Central (CST))
  - Summer (DST): UTC-5 (CDT)
- Area code: 318
- GNIS feature ID: 542951
- FIPS code: 22-04360

Bardel is an unincorporated community in Richland Parish, Louisiana, United States. The community is located 18 miles (28.97 kilometres) east of Monroe, Louisiana.
