= Richland Parish, Louisiana =

Parish in Louisiana, United States

- Parish
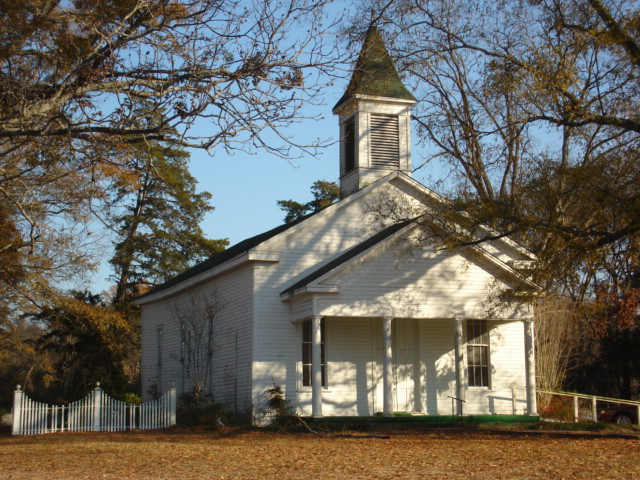
- Alto Presbyterian Church

- Location within the U.S. state of Louisiana
- Coordinates: 32.421736°N 91.762070°W
- Country: United States
- State: Louisiana
- Founded: September 29, 1878
- Named for: Fertile (rich) land in the area
- Seat: Rayville
- Largest town: Rayville

Area
  - Total: 576 sq mi (1,490 km^{2})
  - Land: 559 sq mi (1,450 km^{2})
  - Water: 9.375 sq mi (24.28 km^{2}) 1.6%

Population (2020)
  - Total: 20,043
  - Estimate (2025): 19,582 ▼
  - Density: 35.9/sq mi (13.8/km^{2})
- Time zone: UTC−6 (Central)
  - Summer (DST): UTC−5 (CDT)

Richland Parish is a parish located in the North Louisiana Delta Country in the U.S. state of Louisiana, known for its fertile, flat farmland, cane brakes, and open spaces. The parish had a population of 20,043 at the 2020 United States census. The name Richland was chosen due to the rich production from farming. The parish seat and largest community is Rayville.

== History ==
The parish was officially created on September 29, 1868. Rayville, Louisiana, the parish seat, was named for John Ray, a politician from Monroe with large land holdings in present-day Rayville.

Richland Parish is home to the first public parish library in the State of Louisiana, the Rhymes Memorial Library. The library was built in 1925 by the Lambda Kappa Club of Rayville. R.R. Rhymes donated the original building in memory of his wife, Nonnie Roark Rhymes.

In 2024, Louisiana state political leaders cleared regulatory and tax disincentives to attract a data center for Meta called Hyperion to be built upon approximately six square miles in Richland Parish. The legislation was created and passed in secret, with state officials and legislators bound by controversial non-disclosure agreements. The data center is located on mostly abandoned former rice and soybean farms. As temporary workers arrived to build the project, some longtime residents saw rents increase six-fold and were forced to relocate to areas not affected by the influx.

== Geography ==
Bayou Macon flows through the eastern areas of Richland. Other tributaries in the parish include Crew Lake, and the Lafourche Diversion Canal are located in the western portion of the parish. Boeuf River flows from the northern end to the southern end in the center of the parish.

=== Adjacent parishes ===
- Morehouse Parish (north)
- West Carroll Parish (northeast)
- East Carroll Parish (east)
- Madison Parish (east)
- Franklin Parish (south)
- Caldwell Parish (southwest)
- Ouachita Parish (west)

=== Parks and wildlife management areas ===
- Poverty Point Reservoir State Park
- Russell Sage Wildlife Management Area

== Communities ==
=== Towns ===
- Delhi
- Rayville (parish seat and largest municipality)

=== Village ===
- Mangham

=== Unincorporated areas ===
==== Census-designated place ====
- Start

==== Unincorporated communities ====
- Alto
- Archibald
- Bardel
- Bee Bayou
- Buckner
- Charlieville
- Crew Lake
- Dehlco
- Dunn
- Four Forks
- Gilleyville
- Girard
- Holly Ridge
- Jonesburg
- Mitchiner
- New Light
- Rhymes
- Sacksonia
- Warden

== Transportation ==
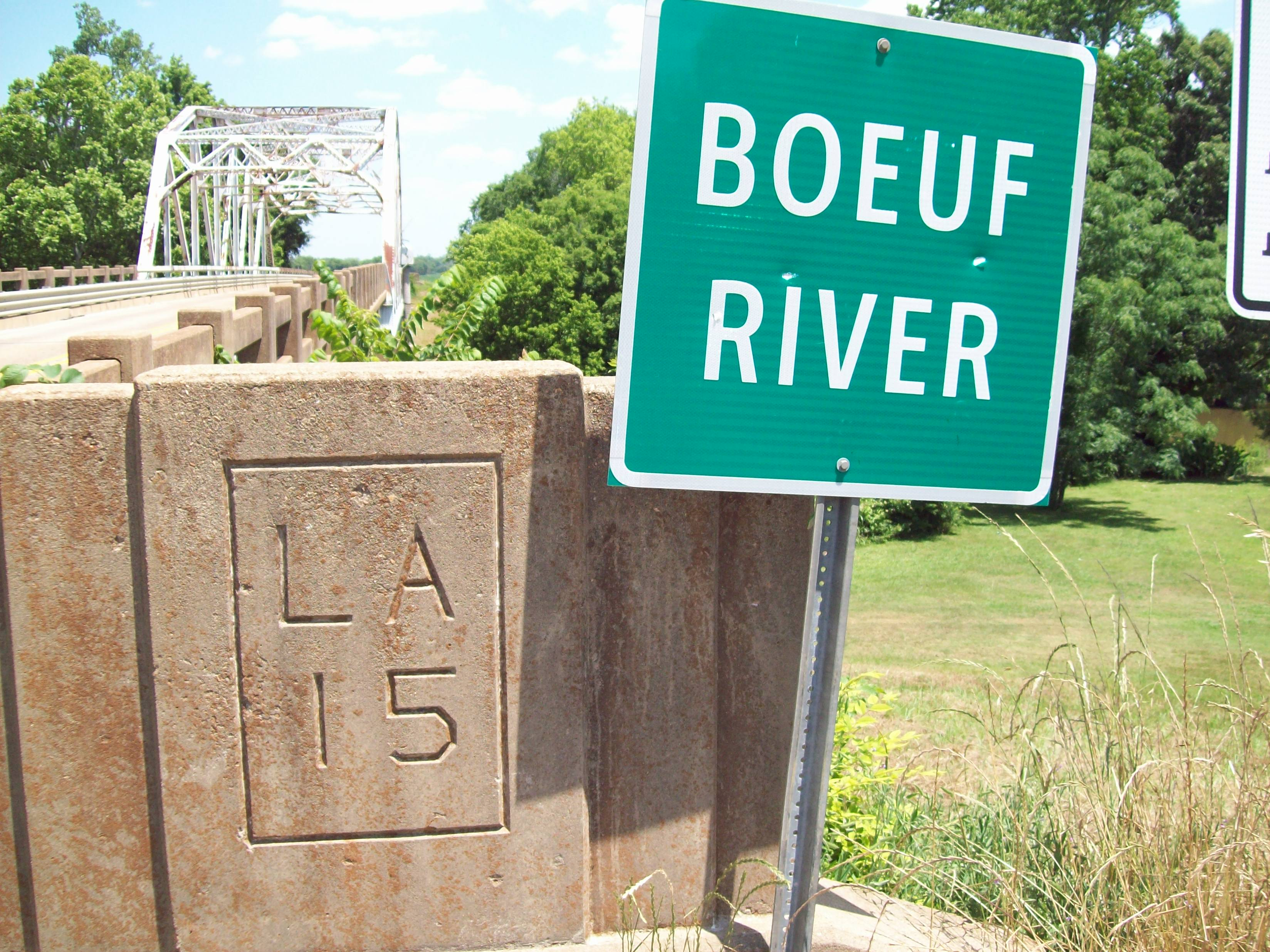
Bridge crossing the Boeuf River on Hwy 15 near Alto, LA

Interstates and State Highways
Interstate 20
U.S. Highway 80
U.S. Highway 425
Louisiana Highway 15
Louisiana Highway 17
Louisiana Highway 132
Louisiana Highway 133
Louisiana Highway 134
Louisiana Highway 135
Louisiana Highway 183
Louisiana Highway 561
Louisiana Highway 576
Louisiana Highway 583
Louisiana Highway 584
Louisiana Highway 585
Louisiana Highway 595
Louisiana Highway 609
Louisiana Highway 622
Louisiana Highway 852
Louisiana Highway 854
Louisiana Highway 855
Louisiana Highway 856
Louisiana Highway 877
Louisiana Highway 3048

Air, Rail, Levee
Rayville Municipal Airport
Delhi Municipal Airport
Monroe Regional Airport
Kansas City Southern Railroad
Tensas Basin Levee District

== Demographics ==
Historical population
Census	Pop.	Note	%±
1870	5,110		—
1880	8,440		65.2%
1890	10,230		21.2%
1900	11,116		8.7%
1910	15,769		41.9%
1920	20,860		32.3%
1930	26,374		26.4%
1940	28,829		9.3%
1950	26,672		−7.5%
1960	23,824		−10.7%
1970	21,774		−8.6%
1980	22,187		1.9%
1990	20,629		−7.0%
2000	20,981		1.7%
2010	20,725		−1.2%
2020	20,043		−3.3%
2025 (est.)	19,582	▼	−2.3%
U.S. Decennial Census; 1790–1960 1900–1990; 1990–2000 2010

=== 2020 census ===
As of the 2020 census, the parish had a population of 20,043, a median age of 40.4 years, with 23.3% of residents under the age of 18 and 18.0% of residents 65 years of age or older; for every 100 females there were 98.4 males and for every 100 females age 18 and over there were 95.5 males age 18 and over.

There were 7,674 households in the parish, including 4,972 families; 32.4% had children under the age of 18, 42.4% were married-couple households, 18.2% were households with a male householder and no spouse or partner present, 33.3% were households with a female householder and no spouse or partner present, 27.8% consisted of individuals, and 12.2% had someone living alone who was 65 years of age or older.

The racial makeup of the parish was 58.8% White, 36.6% Black or African American, 0.3% American Indian and Alaska Native, 0.2% Asian, <0.1% Native Hawaiian and Pacific Islander, 0.9% from some other race, and 3.2% from two or more races. Hispanic or Latino residents of any race comprised 2.0% of the population.

<0.1% of residents lived in urban areas, while 100.0% lived in rural areas.

There were 8,628 housing units, of which 11.1% were vacant; 68.6% of occupied housing units were owner-occupied and 31.4% were renter-occupied. The homeowner vacancy rate was 1.2% and the rental vacancy rate was 5.5%.

=== Racial and ethnic composition ===
Richland Parish, Louisiana – Racial and ethnic composition Note: the US Census treats Hispanic/Latino as an ethnic category. This table excludes Latinos from the racial categories and assigns them to a separate category. Hispanics/Latinos may be of any race.
Race / Ethnicity (NH = Non-Hispanic)	Pop 1980	Pop 1990	Pop 2000	Pop 2010	Pop 2020	% 1980	% 1990	% 2000	% 2010	% 2020
White alone (NH)	14,153	12,910	12,667	12,714	11,667	63.79%	62.58%	60.37%	61.35%	58.21%
Black or African American alone (NH)	7,754	7,492	7,927	7,406	7,303	34.95%	36.32%	37.78%	35.73%	36.44%
Native American or Alaska Native alone (NH)	11	14	26	57	53	0.05%	0.07%	0.12%	0.28%	0.26%
Asian alone (NH)	21	13	36	54	50	0.09%	0.06%	0.17%	0.26%	0.25%
Native Hawaiian or Pacific Islander alone (NH)	x	x	0	2	0	x	x	0.00%	0.01%	0.00%
Other race alone (NH)	2	1	3	6	66	0.01%	0.00%	0.01%	0.03%	0.33%
Mixed race or Multiracial (NH)	x	x	95	154	504	x	x	0.45%	0.74%	2.51%
Hispanic or Latino (any race)	246	199	227	332	400	1.11%	0.96%	1.08%	1.60%	2.00%
Total	22,187	20,629	20,981	20,725	20,043	100.00%	100.00%	100.00%	100.00%	100.00%

== Education ==
=== Public schools ===
- Delhi Elementary
- Delhi Middle School
- Delhi High School
- Holly Ridge Elementary
- Mangham Elementary
- Mangham Junior High
- Mangham High School
- Rayville Elementary
- Rayville Junior High
- Rayville High School
- Start Elementary

=== Private schools ===
- Riverfield Academy, K–12

=== Charter schools ===
- Delhi Charter, K–12

=== Community and technical colleges ===
- Louisiana Delta Community College, (with campus locations in neighboring Tallulah, Winnsboro, Lake Providence, Bastrop, Monroe, and West Monroe.)

=== Regional universities ===
- University of Louisiana at Monroe
- Louisiana Tech University, (Ruston)
- Grambling State University, (Grambling)

== Government ==
Parish Administration	Administrators
Sheriff	Gary Gilley, No Party
Coroner	Dr. Matt Prine, Republican
Assessor	Lee Brown, III, Democrat
School Board Superintendent	Sheldon Jones
Homeland Security	Dawn Williams

Parish Police Jury	Police Jurors
District 1, Delhi	Steve Craig, Republican
District 2, Delhi	Patrick Stubblefield, Democrat
District 3, Rayville	Sharon Gee, Democrat
District 4, Rayville	Steve Lofton, Republican
District 5, Rayville	Paul Slayter, Republican
District 6, Rayville	Althan Smith, Democrat
District 7, Alto	Cecil Reddick, Republican
District 8, Start	Elliot Colvin, Republican
District 9, Mangham	Roy Wiggins Jr., Republican

5th Judicial District	Parish Judicial Leaders
Division "A"	Clay Hamilton, Republican
Division "B"	Will Rhymes Barham, Republican
Division "C"	Steve Dean, Republican
Clerk of Court	Stacie Williamson, Republican

Parish School Board	Board Members
District 1, Delhi	Billy Calvert, No Party
District 2, Delhi	Eugene Young Jr., Democrat
District 3, Rayville	Moses "DeJohn" Wilkins, Democrat
District 4, Rayville	James Hough, Republican
District 5, Rayville	Alece Copeland, No Party
District 6, Rayville	Marie Lewis, Democrat
District 7, Archibald	Joe Chapman, No Party
District 8, Start	Kevin Eppinette, No Party
District 9, Mangham	Chris Pruitt, Republican

== Notable people ==
- Julia Letlow, from Start, elected Member of Congress in the United States House of Representatives.
- Luke Letlow, from Start, elected to the United States House of Representatives, but died of a heart attack caused by COVID-19 before he could be seated.
- Ralph Abraham, from Alto, elected Member of Congress in United States House of Representatives.
- Harry W. Addison was a Southern author and humorist who resided in Rayville from 1945 to 1957.
- Jamar Adcock, a politician and banker in Monroe, born in Richland Parish.
- Terry Doughty, is a federally appointed judge for the Western District of Louisiana.
- Elvin Hayes, Hall of Fame basketball player, born in Rayville.
- Arlene Howell, Miss Louisiana USA 1958, Miss USA 1958.
- Ralph E. King, Winnsboro physician who represented Richland Parish in the Louisiana State Senate from 1944 to 1952 and again from 1956 to 1960.
- William L. Kirk, of Rayville was a United States Air Force four-star general who served as Commander in Chief, U.S. Air Forces in Europe/Commander, Allied Air Forces Central Europe.
- Ernie Ladd, a football player/professional wrestler, born in Rayville.
- Moses J. Liddell was appointed by President Grover Cleveland as a judge for the Supreme Court of the Montana Territory.
- Wiley Person Mangham, an American publisher and editor. He is the namesake of the town of Mangham, Louisiana.
- Tim McGraw, Country musician, born in Delhi, and raised in Start.
- Robert Max Ross, was a Republican politician and activist who qualified to run for governor, U.S. Senate, and the U.S. House, for the purpose of advancing the two-party system in Louisiana, at a time it did not exist.
- Francis C. Thompson served in the Louisiana House of Representatives from 1975 until 2008, in the Louisiana State Senate from 2008 until 2020, and again in the Louisiana House of Representatives from 2020 to present.
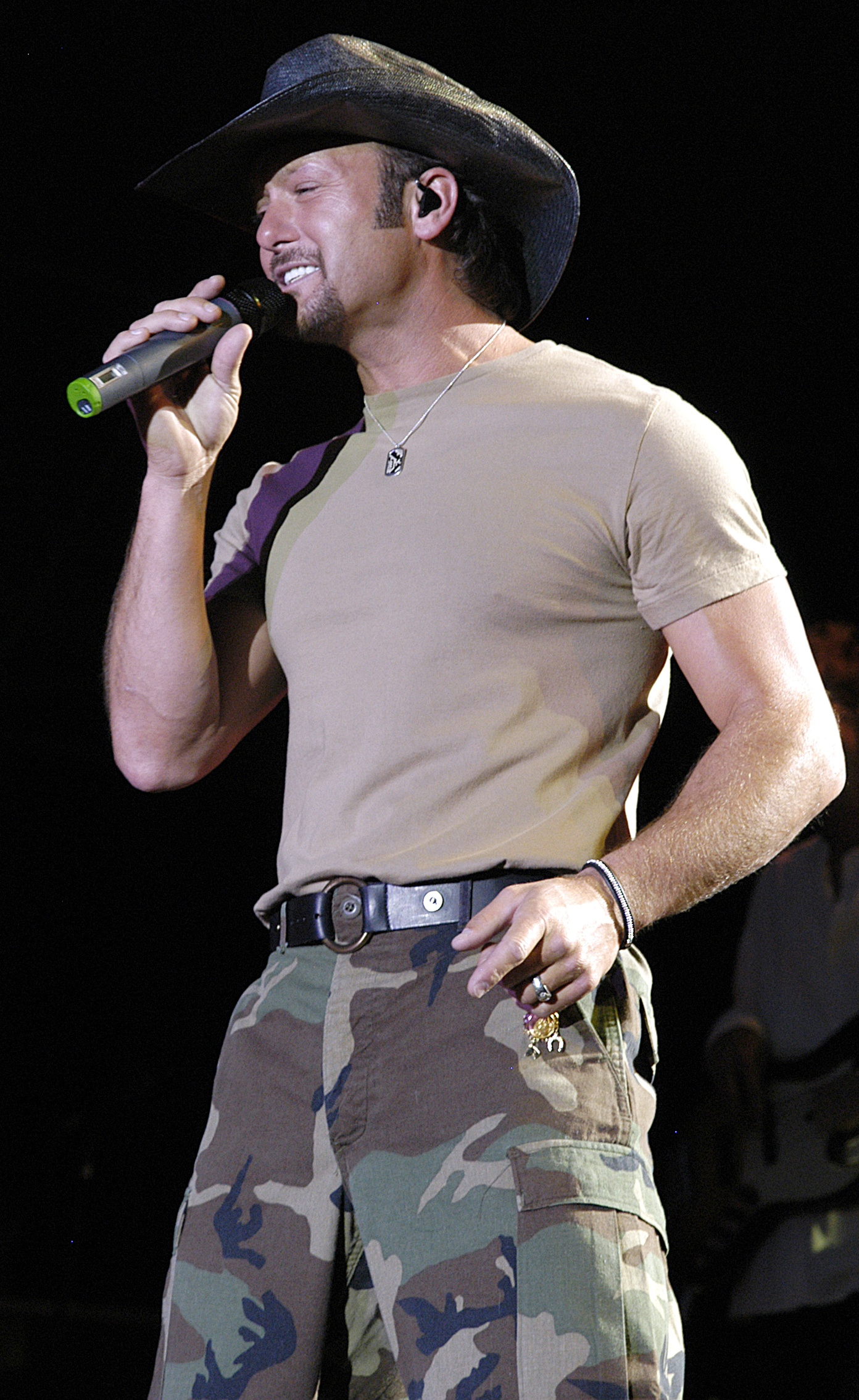
Tim McGraw, a famous country musician.

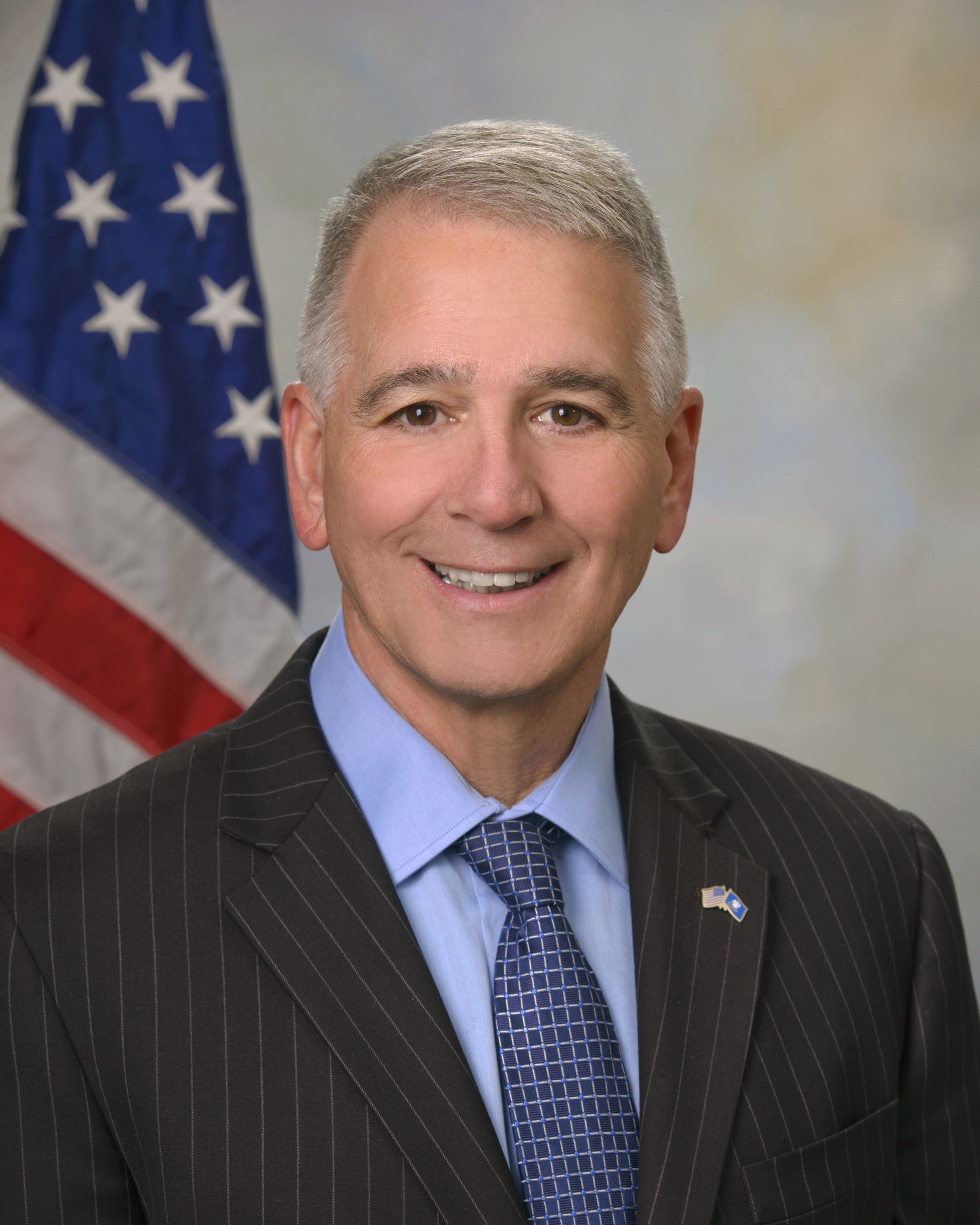
Ralph Abraham, U.S. House of Representatives.

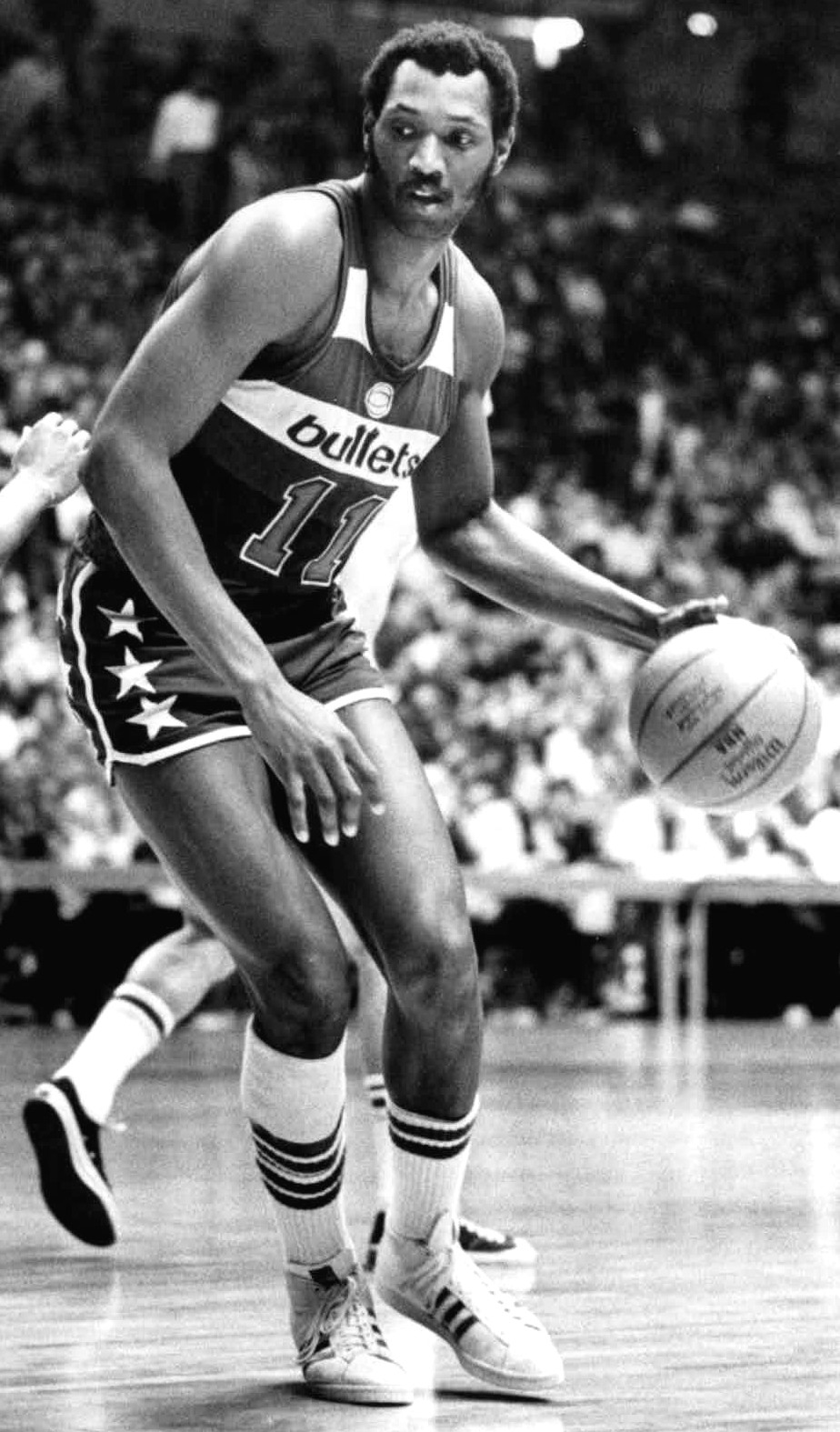
Elvin Hayes, NBA's 50th Anniversary All-Time Team.

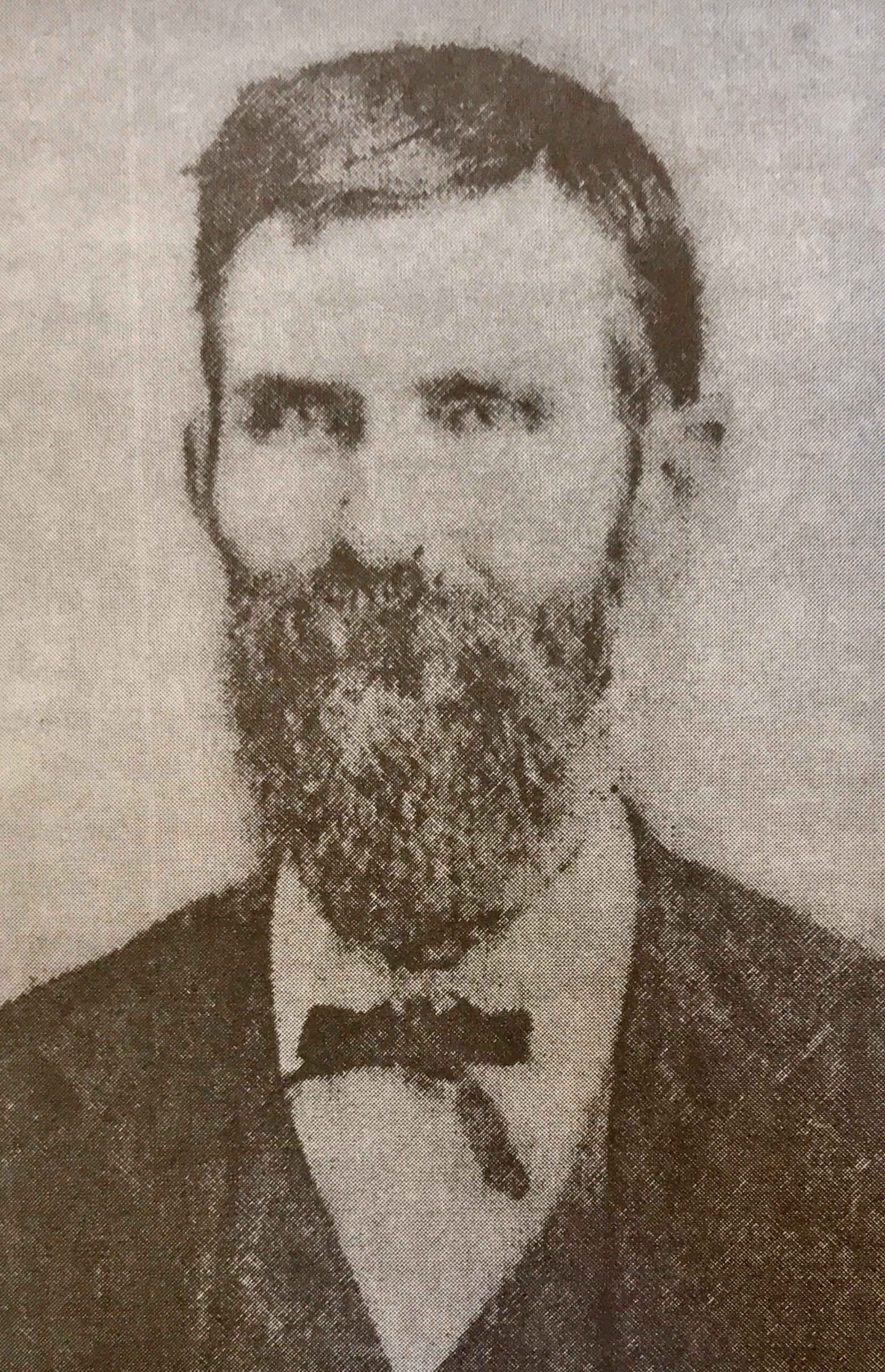
Wiley Person Mangham, American Publisher and Editor.

== Gallery ==
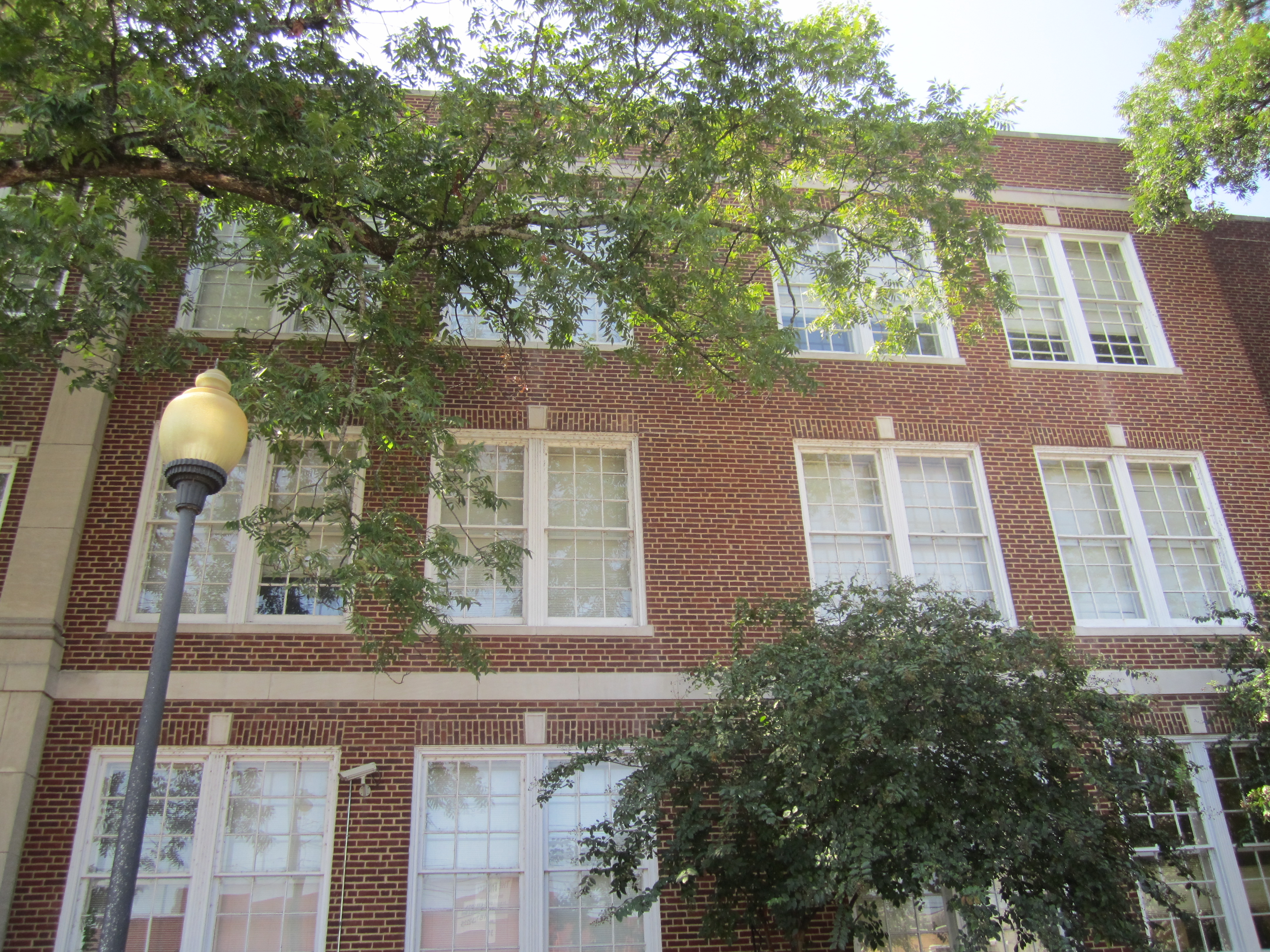
Former Rayville High School, operated by the Richland Parish School Board and originally designed by the Shreveport architect Edward F. Neild, was renovated into an apartment complex

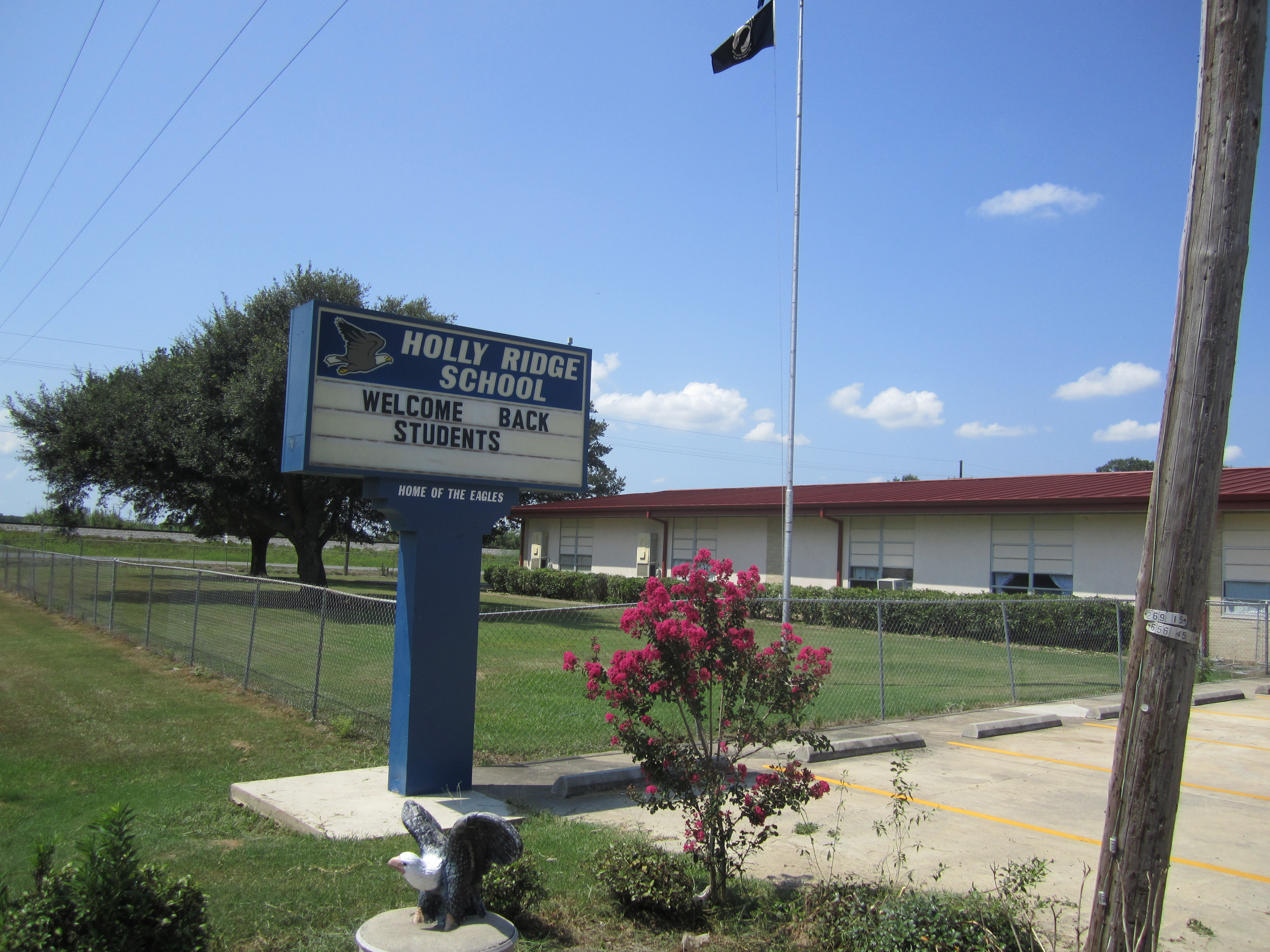
Holly Ridge High School in Holly Ridge in rural Richland Parish

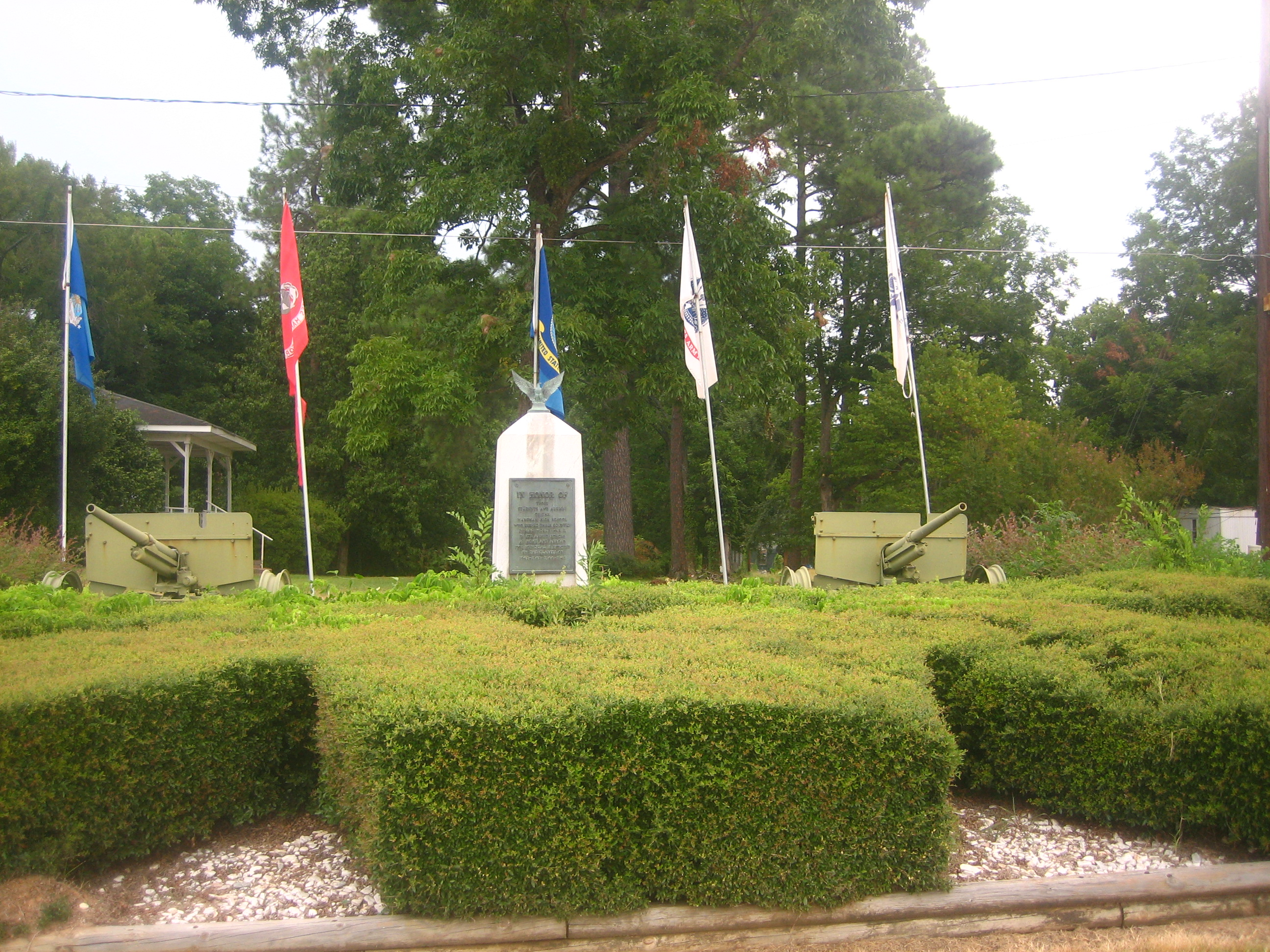
Veteran's Memorial in Mangham

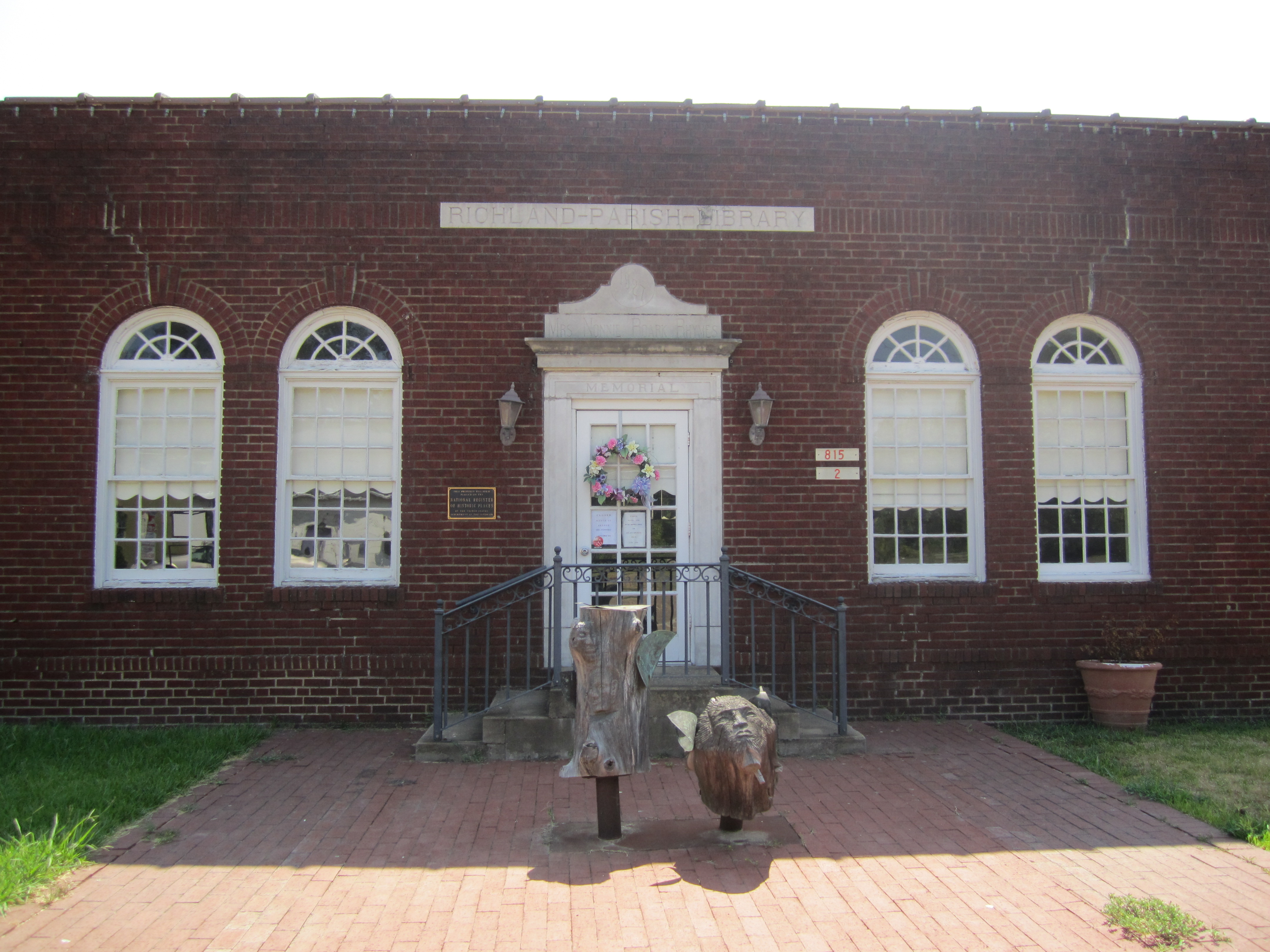
Rhymes Memorial Library in Rayville was the first parish wide public library in Louisiana.

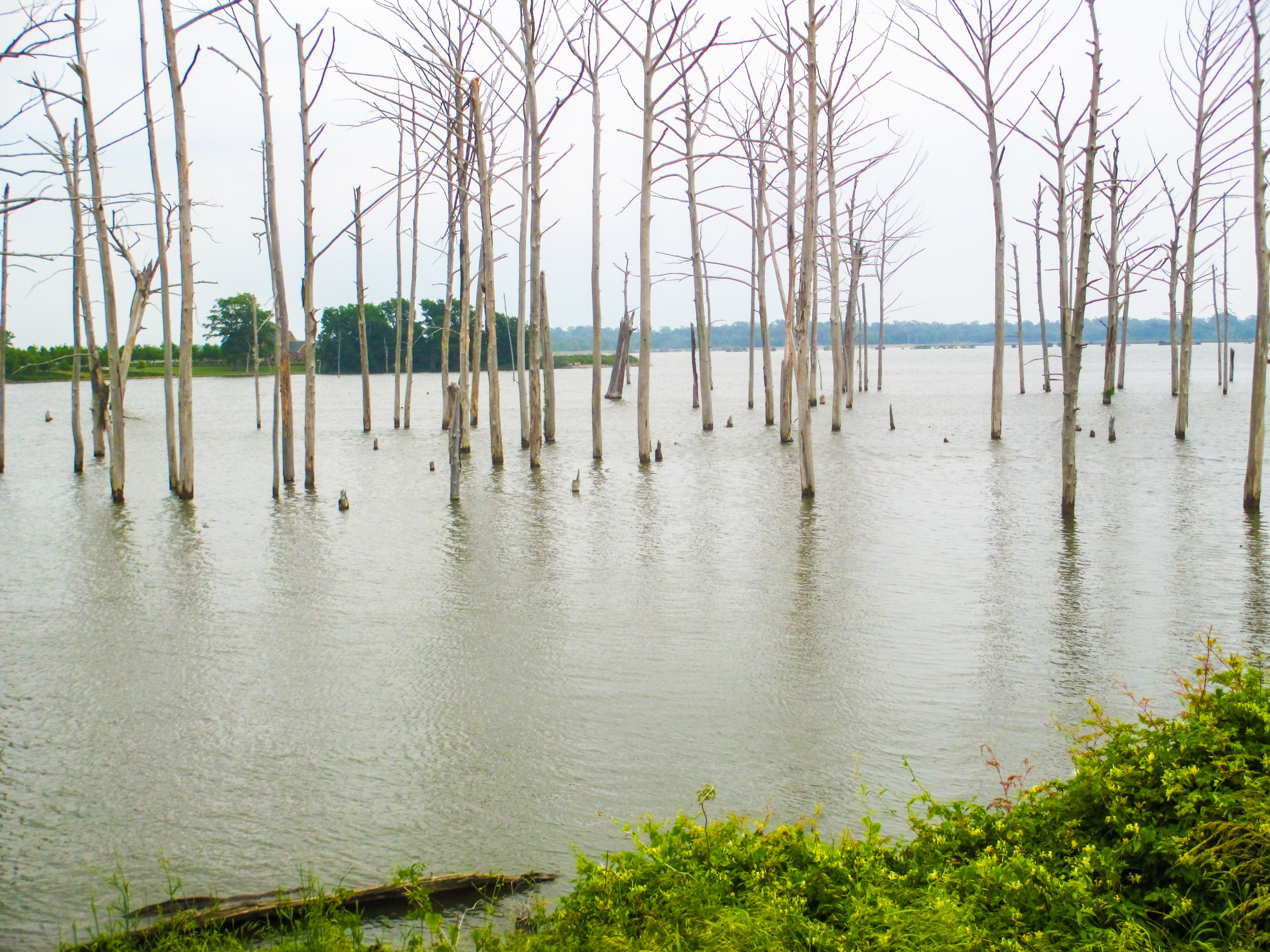
Poverty Point Reservoir in Delhi.

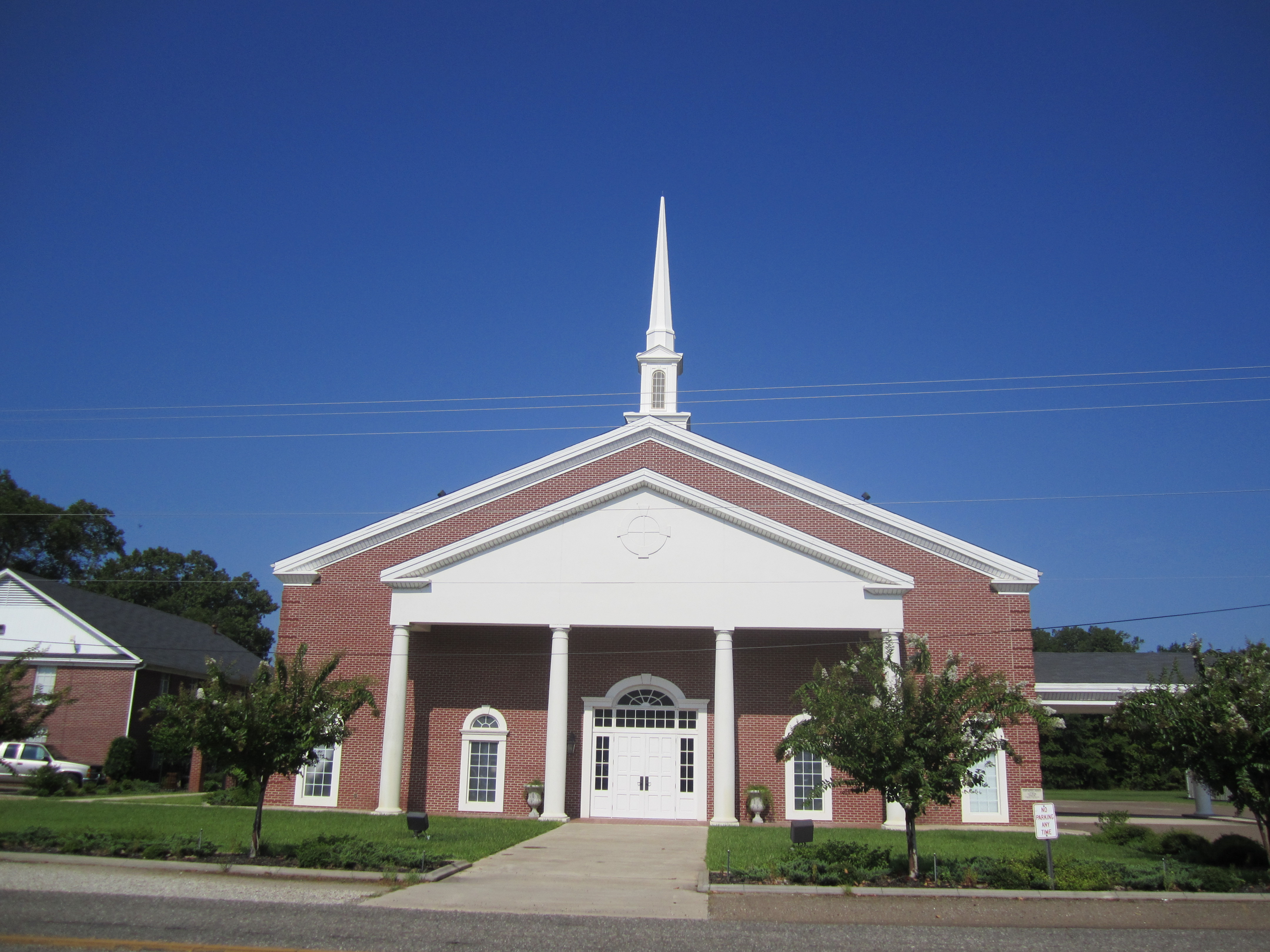
Start Baptist Church

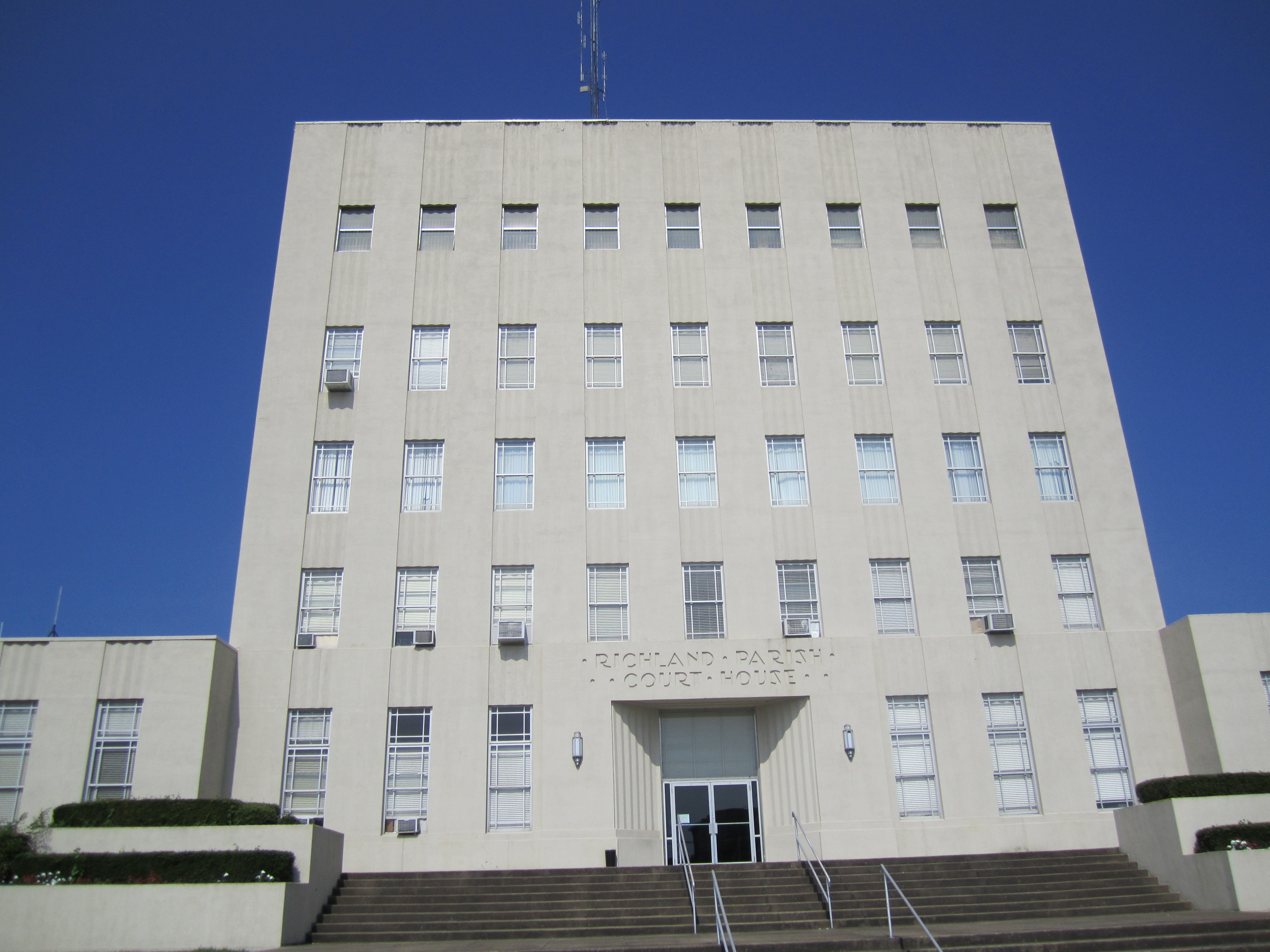
Richland Parish Courthouse, in Rayville

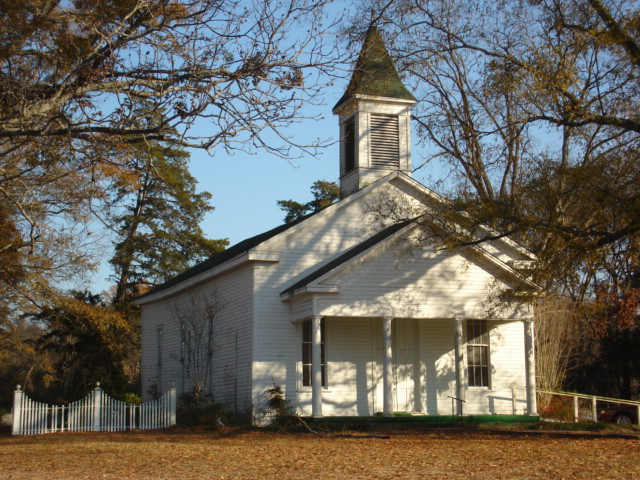
Alto Presbyterian Church, built in 1873

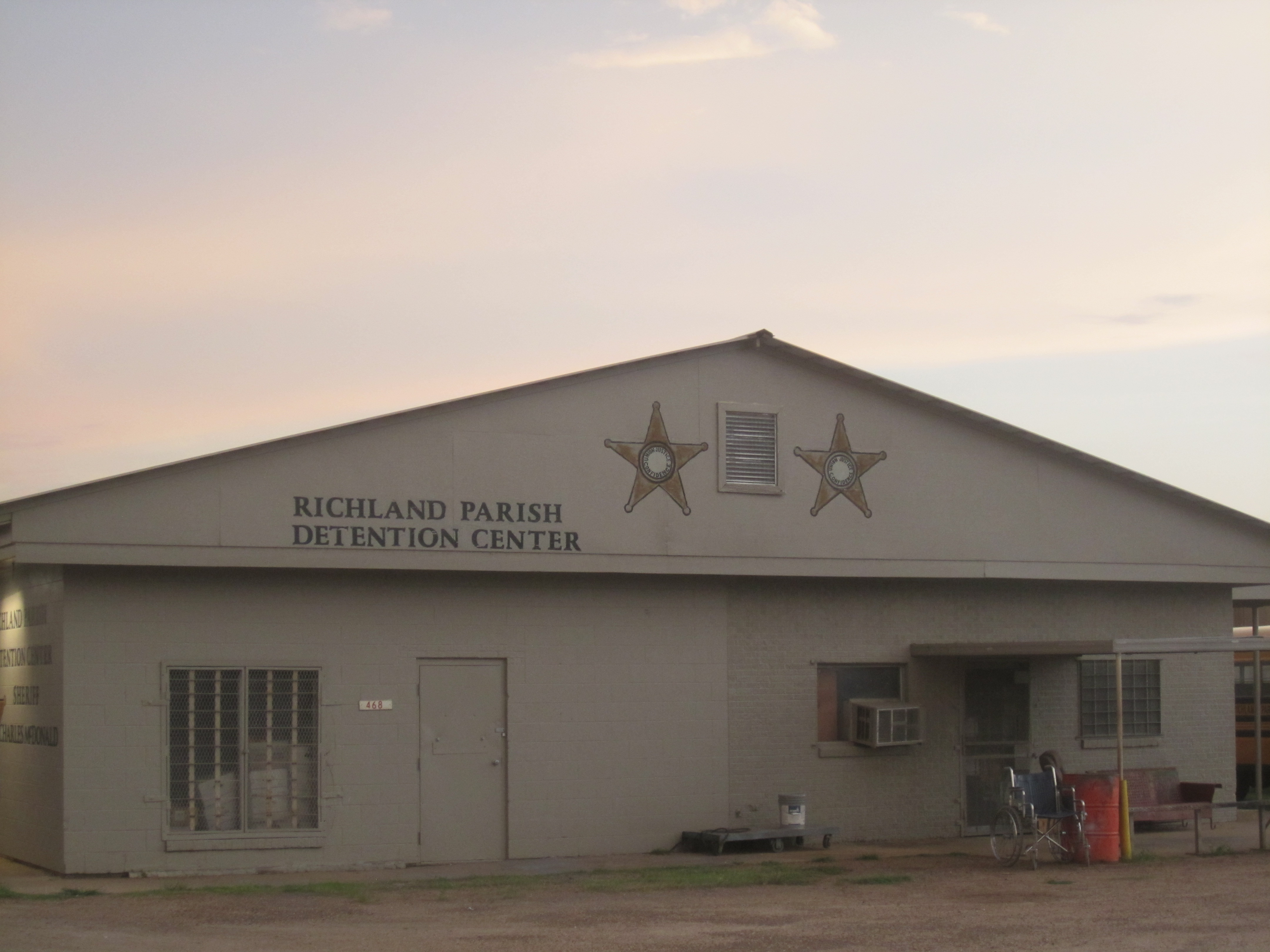
Richland Parish Detention Center near Alto, Louisiana

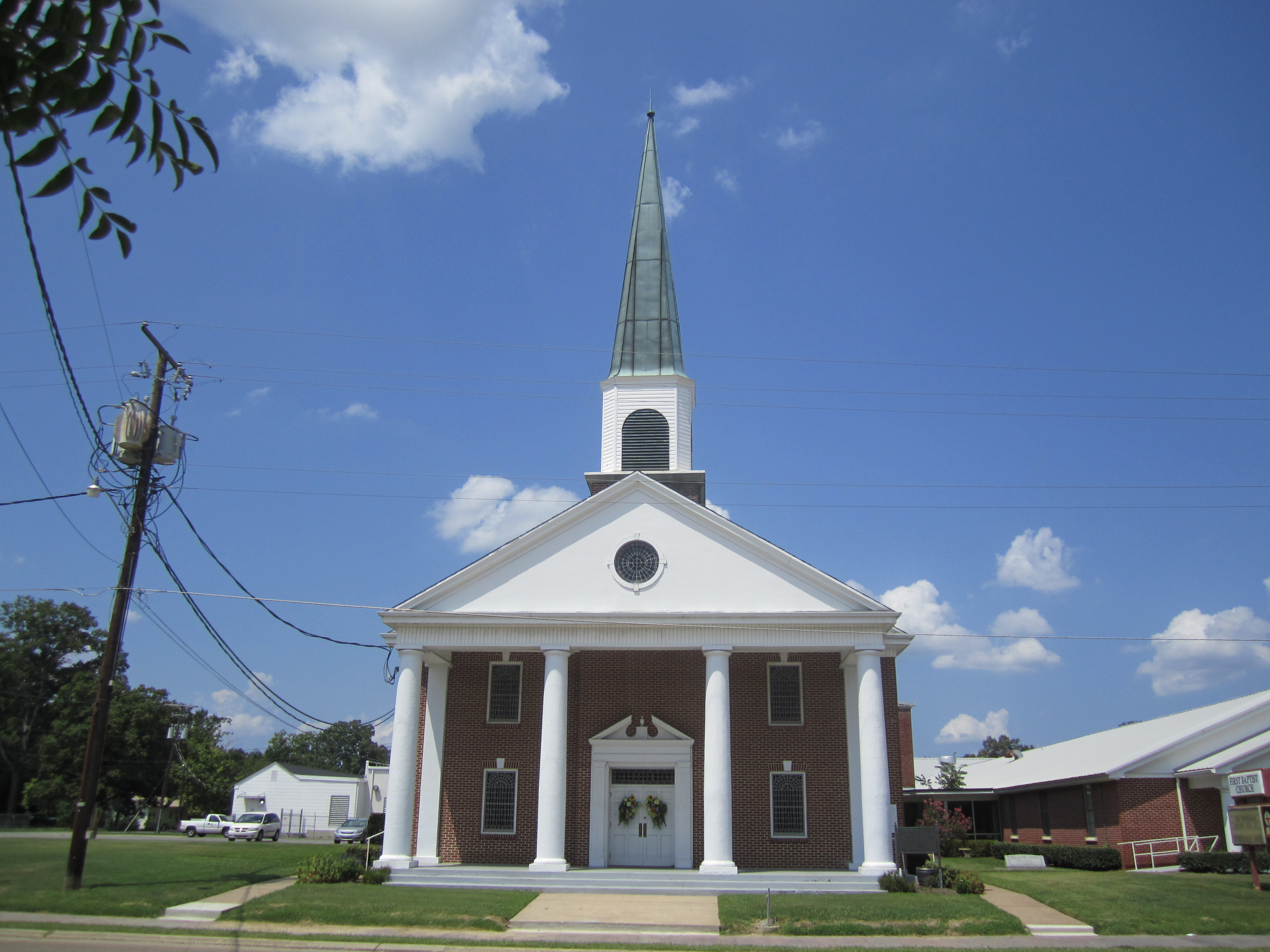
First Baptist Church in Delhi

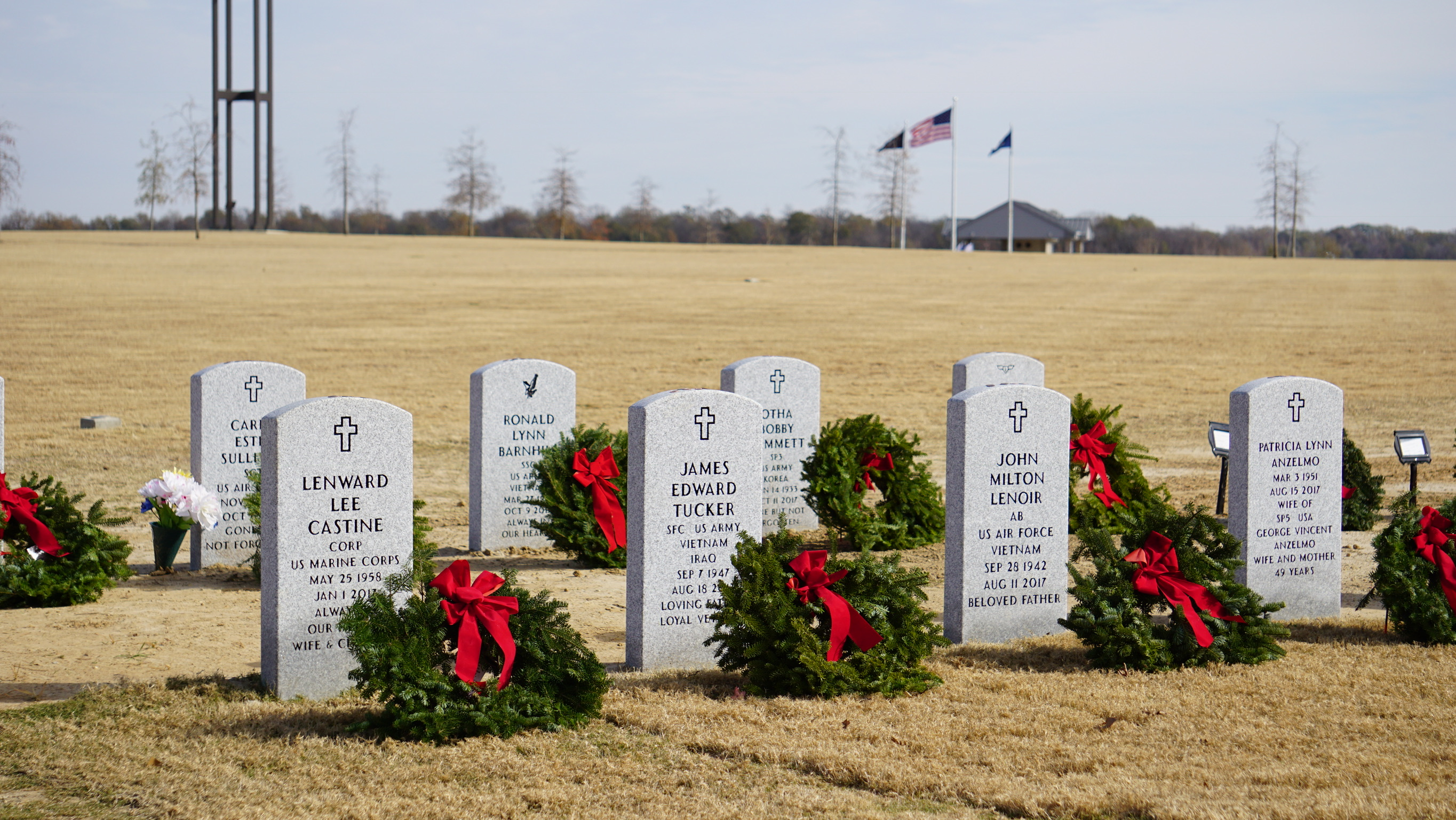
Northeast Louisiana Veterans Cemetery

== Politics ==
United States presidential election results for Richland Parish, Louisiana
Year	Republican		Democratic		Third party(ies)	
Year	No.	%	No.	%	No.	%
1912	2	0.46%	393	89.93%	42	9.61%
1916	7	1.07%	650	98.93%	0	0.00%
1920	50	7.00%	664	93.00%	0	0.00%
1924	116	14.61%	678	85.39%	0	0.00%
1928	242	18.26%	1,083	81.74%	0	0.00%
1932	46	2.53%	1,773	97.42%	1	0.05%
1936	165	6.36%	2,425	93.48%	4	0.15%
1940	310	11.37%	2,417	88.63%	0	0.00%
1944	488	18.95%	2,087	81.05%	0	0.00%
1948	119	4.69%	960	37.87%	1,456	57.44%
1952	1,645	39.70%	2,499	60.30%	0	0.00%
1956	1,063	29.88%	1,094	30.76%	1,400	39.36%
1960	1,378	35.62%	996	25.74%	1,495	38.64%
1964	4,498	85.76%	747	14.24%	0	0.00%
1968	1,031	15.95%	1,017	15.74%	4,415	68.31%
1972	4,304	70.80%	1,335	21.96%	440	7.24%
1976	3,630	49.93%	3,495	48.07%	145	1.99%
1980	4,772	54.57%	3,745	42.83%	227	2.60%
1984	5,980	65.84%	2,918	32.13%	185	2.04%
1988	5,226	62.85%	2,833	34.07%	256	3.08%
1992	3,808	42.77%	3,706	41.63%	1,389	15.60%
1996	3,765	43.23%	4,143	47.57%	802	9.21%
2000	4,895	57.69%	3,282	38.68%	308	3.63%
2004	5,471	63.14%	3,082	35.57%	112	1.29%
2008	5,751	62.64%	3,311	36.06%	119	1.30%
2012	5,846	62.66%	3,387	36.31%	96	1.03%
2016	6,287	65.51%	3,157	32.90%	153	1.59%
2020	6,607	66.47%	3,225	32.44%	108	1.09%
2024	6,354	69.12%	2,732	29.72%	107	1.16%

== See also ==
- National Register of Historic Places listings in Richland Parish, Louisiana
