= Rhymes, Louisiana =

- Unincorporated community
- Location within Louisiana Location within the United States
- Coordinates: 32°22′45″N 91°53′56″W
- Country: United States
- State: Louisiana
- Parish: Richland
- Elevation: 72 ft (22 m)
- Time zone: UTC-6 (Central (CST))
  - Summer (DST): UTC-5 (CDT)
- Area code: 318
- GNIS feature ID: 541173
- FIPS code: 22-64405

Rhymes is an unincorporated community in Richland Parish, Louisiana, United States. The community is located 10 miles (16.09 kilometres) SW of Rayville, Louisiana.

== Name origin ==
It is speculated that the name of the community is derived from the local Rhymes plantation that was built during the Antebellum period.
