= Nai Roshni =

Nai Roshni (lit. 'New Light' in Hindi) may refer to these Indian films:

- Nai Roshni (1941 film), an Indian drama film
- Nai Roshni (1967 film), a Bollywood film

== See also ==
- New Light (disambiguation)
