= Dehlco, Louisiana =

- Unincorporated community
- Location within Louisiana Location within the United States
- Coordinates: 32°23′48″N 91°46′10″W
- Country: United States
- State: Louisiana
- Parish: Richland
- Elevation: 89 ft (27 m)
- Time zone: UTC-6 (Central (CST))
  - Summer (DST): UTC-5 (CDT)
- Area code: 318
- GNIS feature ID: 554217

Dehlco is an unincorporated community in Richland Parish, Louisiana, United States. The community is located 5 miles (8.05 kilometres) S. of Rayville, Louisiana.
