= Wiley Person Mangham =

American publisher and editor

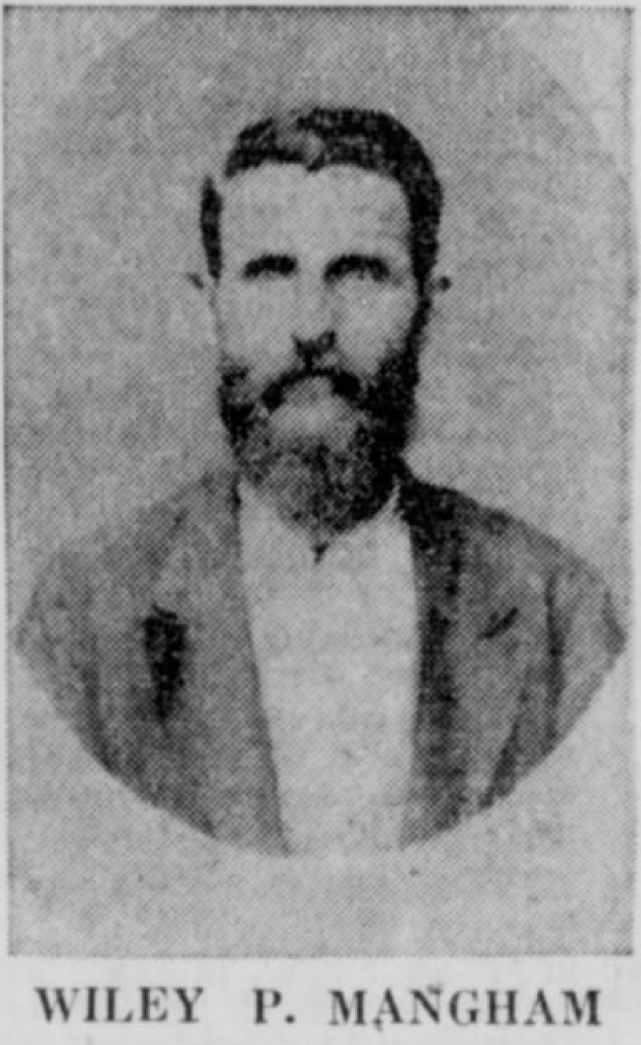
- Founding Editor and Publisher of the Richland Beacon News
- Born: January 1, 1838; Russell County, Alabama
- Died: September 26, 1896 (aged 58); Richland Parish, Louisiana
- Occupations: Editor and Publisher
- Spouse: Caroline Frances Emaline "Fannie" Lynn
- Children: 10 Children (first 5 died young)
- Parent(s): Thomas R. Mangham and Matilda Dandridge Grant

Wiley Person Mangham (1838–1896) was an American publisher and editor, who was born in Russell County, Alabama and died in Richland Parish, Louisiana. The town of Mangham, Louisiana was named for him.

== Biography ==
Wiley P. Mangham was the founding publisher and editor for the Richland Beacon News, and was the first parish recorder for Richland Parish at the time of its founding in 1868. At the close of the Civil War, he came to Northeast Louisiana and in 1869, founded the Richland Beacon, the first weekly newspaper in the parish.

=== Early life ===
Wiley Mangham was the youngest of 10 children born to Thomas R. Mangham and Matilda Dandridge Grant Mangham. Thomas was the first clerk of Stewart County, Georgia, at the time of its creation. He later moved to Russell County Alabama, where he found great success as a planter and land speculator. His home and property however was destroyed by Native Americans who lived near the father Mangham's new home. Thomas died in 1861. Wiley P. Mangham was educated in the Baptist High School in Jacksonville, Alabama. The Mangham family were strict Baptists in their religious beliefs.

Wiley Mangham enlisted with the Confederacy once the Civil War was underway, and was promoted to the level of drill instructor with the 25th Alabama Infantry, until he was urged to resign due to poor health.

=== Marriage and moving ===
At the close of the war, Mangham married Caroline Frances Emaline "Fannie" Lynn and in 1866, he would come to Louisiana to visit his brother, Henry G. Mangham, who had settled near Nelson Bend, in Richland Parish.

=== Family and Children ===
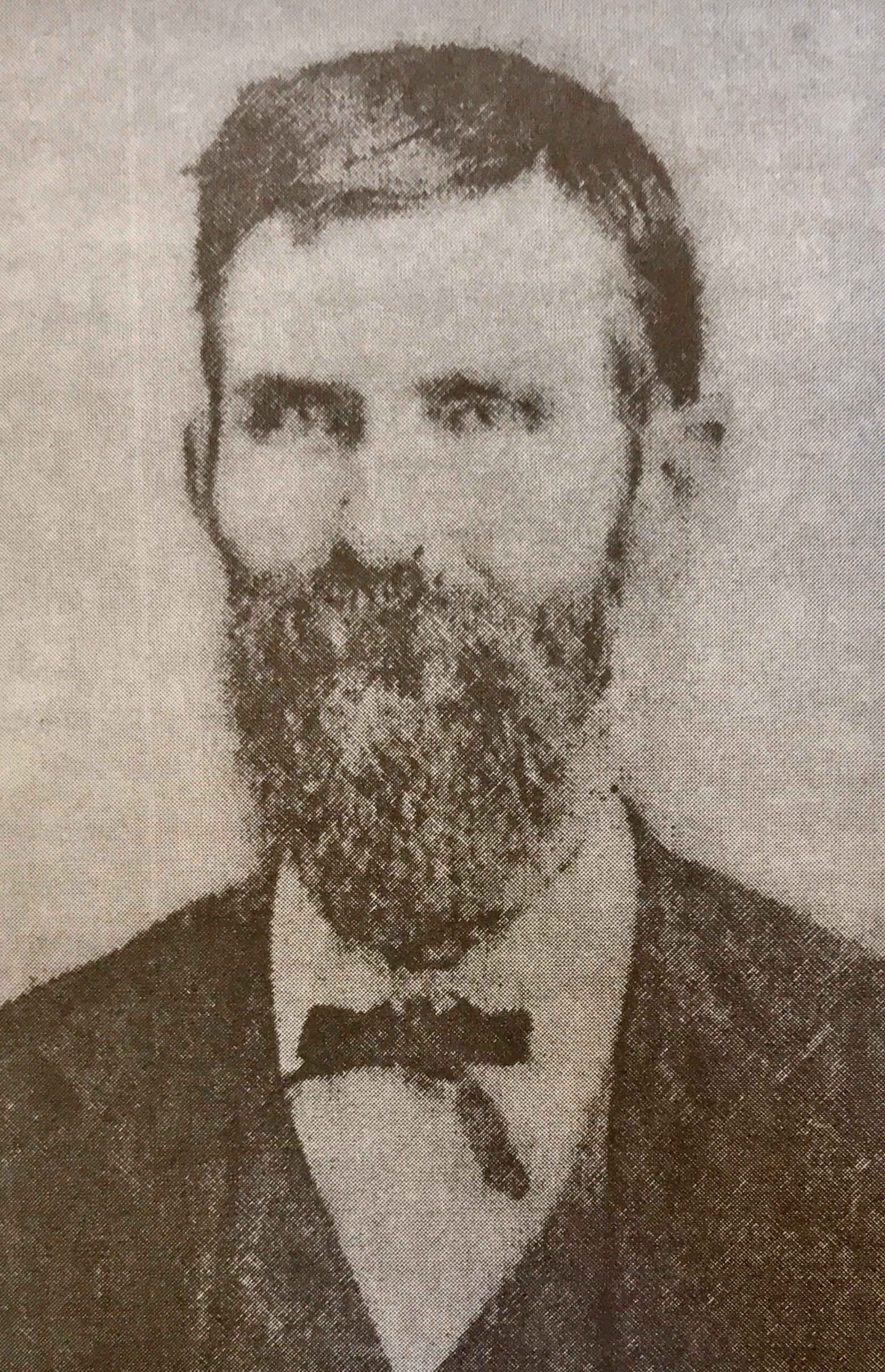
Wiley Person Mangham (1838-1896)

Fannie and Wiley P. Mangham would have a total of 10 children, but their family would lose the first five children to early deaths.

- Jennie L. Mangham (1866–1867) Died of illness.
- Mary A. Mangham (1869–1876) Died of illness.
- Jesse H. Mangham (1871–1871) Died of illness.
- Fannie C. Mangham (1875–1876) Died of illness.
- Wiley S. Mangham (1876-1876) Died of illness.
- Eunice T. Mangham (1877–1967)
- Nettie I. Mangham (1879–1969)
- Robert W. Mangham (1879–1965)
- Horrace A. Mangham (1882–1961)
- Hervey E. Mangham (1889–1908) Died of injury while playing baseball for the LSU Tigers Baseball team.

=== Professional career ===
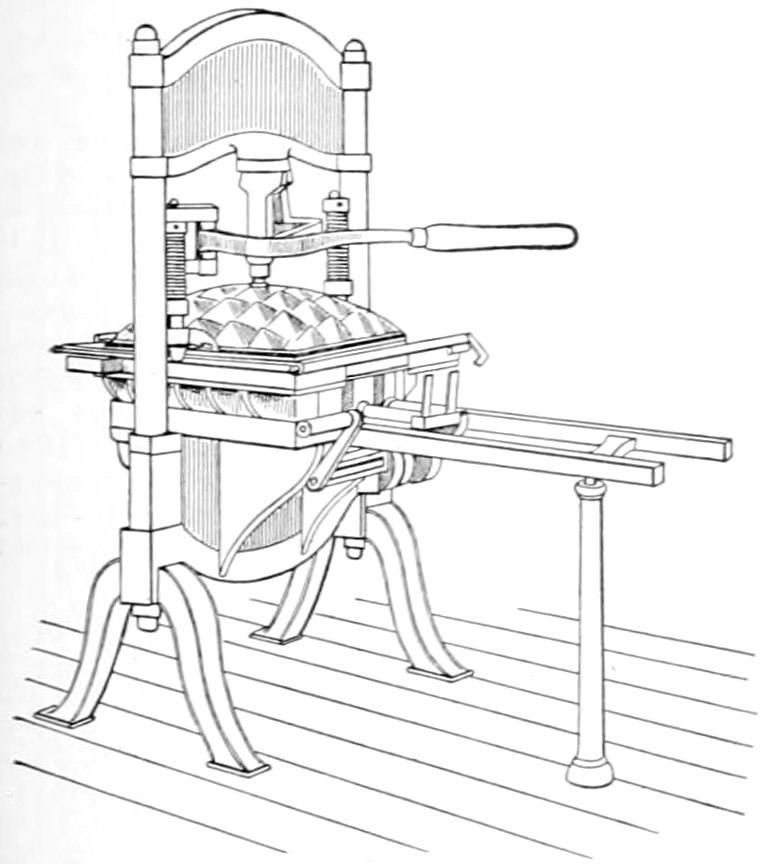
Washington Hand Press

While visiting in Northeast Louisiana in 1868, he paid a visit to Monroe, where he was offered a job in the newspaper office. That same year, the new parish of Richland was created by the Louisiana State Legislature, and Mangham sensed an opportunity for potentially good business ventures. At this time, the town of Rayville was little more than a small courthouse. Mangham purchased land adjacent to the courthouse, and ordered a Washington Hand Press. On January 14, 1869, the first edition of the Richland Beacon News went up for sale. An annual subscription could be purchased for $3.00, but Mangham kindly requested that payment be made up front.

Mangham eventually acquired additional land throughout the parish over the next several years, and eventually he would sell a portion of his land to the railroad company which would enable a new town to be formed, 12 miles south of Rayville. The founders of that town honored Wiley P. Mangham by naming the new town after him, and this town is still known today as Mangham, Louisiana. The streets in Mangham were named after Wiley P.'s children.

== Philosophical and/or political views ==
Mangham was a staunch Democrat, and served as the chairman of the Democratic Executive Committee for Richland Parish at times, and remained very active politically in opposition to the reconstruction politics that followed the close of the Civil War. Mangham penned numerous editorials over the course of his being the publisher and editor of the Richland Beacon. Mangham and his wife were both active members of the Baptist church, and he and his wife Fannie helped start the First Baptist Church of Rayville, where the original members met at their home before a church building was constructed. Mangham also was a member of the Masonic fraternity and the Knights of Pythias.

== Death and legacy ==
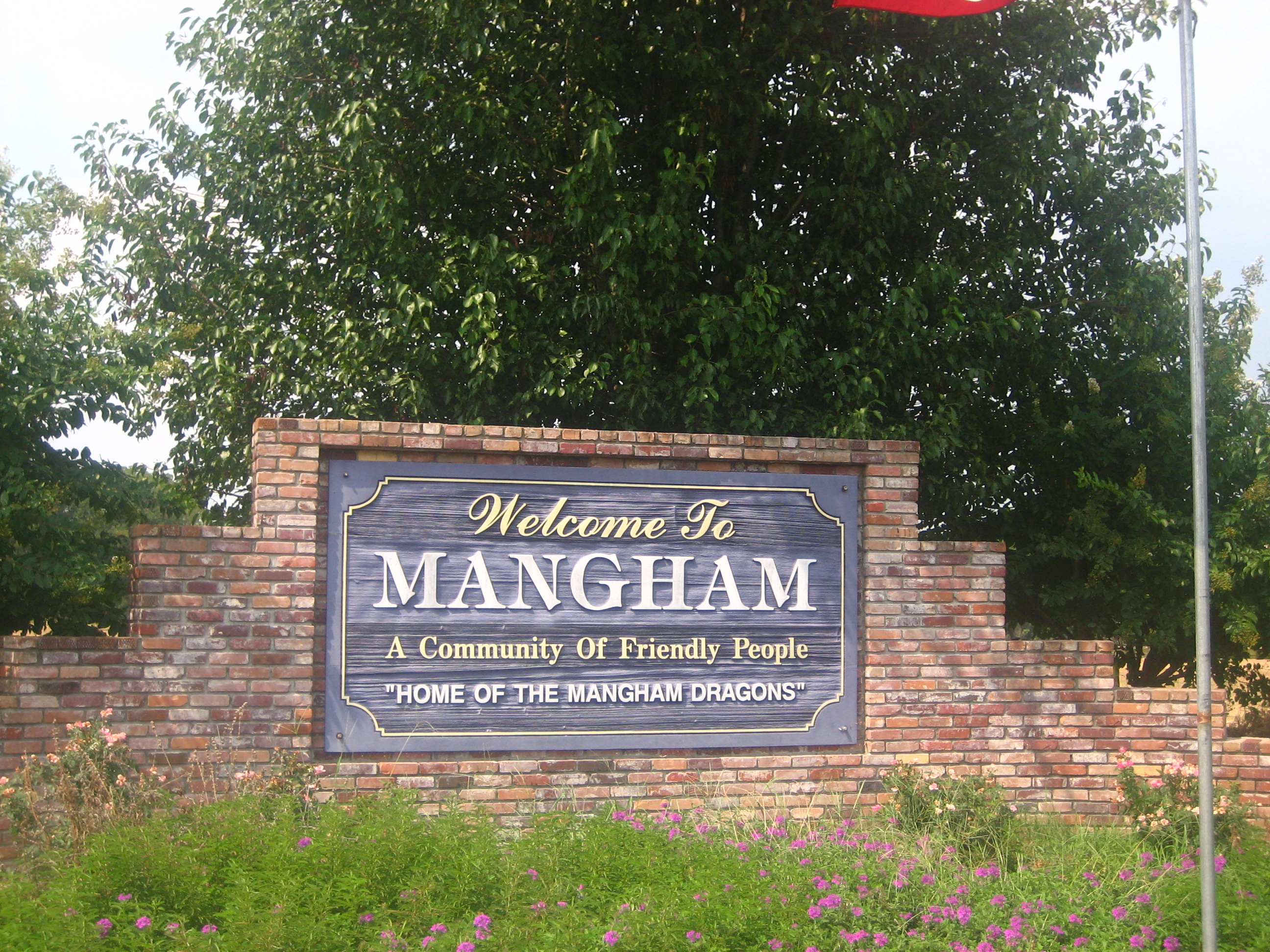
Welcome sign to town of Mangham, La

In 1896, Wiley P. Mangham went on an excursion to Colorado, organized by the Louisiana Press Association. While traveling, he developed pneumonia, and died soon after returning home. He was 58 years of age. Only four of his ten children were living at the time of his death. The Richland Beacon News printed the following description of Wiley P. Mangham in remembering his contributions to the newspaper industry in Louisiana.

"Mr. Mangham was an able and influential journalist, and was recognized as prominent is his profession at the recent press convention, having been long known throughout the State as a man of sterling integrity and a true and loyal Democrat."
