= Mitchiner, Louisiana =

- Unincorporated community
- Location within Louisiana Location within the United States
- Coordinates: 32°34′53″N 91°29′10″W
- Country: United States
- State: Louisiana
- Parish: Richland
- Elevation: 95 ft (29 m)
- Time zone: UTC-6 (Central (CST))
  - Summer (DST): UTC-5 (CDT)
- Area code: 318
- GNIS feature ID: 543478

Mitchiner is an unincorporated community in Richland Parish, Louisiana, United States. The community is located 8 miles (12.87 kilometres) N of Delhi, Louisiana.
