= Dunn, Louisiana =

- Unincorporated community
- Location within Louisiana Location within the United States
- Coordinates: 32°27′52″N 91°34′42″W
- Country: United States
- State: Louisiana
- Parish: Richland
- Elevation: 89 ft (27 m)
- Time zone: UTC-6 (Central (CST))
  - Summer (DST): UTC-5 (CDT)
- Area code: 318
- GNIS feature ID: 543156
- FIPS code: 22-22010

Dunn is an unincorporated community in Richland Parish, Louisiana, United States. The community is located 10 miles (16.09 kilometres) E of Rayville, Louisiana.

== Geography ==
Dunn is located within the Boeuf-Tensas River basin, serving as an intersection where U.S. Route 80, Louisiana Highway 609, and the Kansas City Southern Railway line converge.
