= Crew Lake, Louisiana =

Unincorporated community in Louisiana, U.S.

Coordinates: 32°29′18″N 91°53′13″W

Crew Lake is an unincorporated community in Richland Parish, Louisiana, United States.

== History ==
Crew Lake took the name of the river nearby.
