= Warden, Louisiana =

- Unincorporated community
- Location within Louisiana Location within the United States
- Coordinates: 32°32′16″N 91°29′49″W
- Country: United States
- State: Louisiana
- Parish: Richland
- Elevation: 92 ft (28 m)
- Time zone: UTC-6 (Central (CST))
  - Summer (DST): UTC-5 (CDT)
- Area code: 318
- GNIS feature ID: 556359
- FIPS code: 22-79625

Warden is an unincorporated community in Richland Parish, Louisiana, United States. The community is located 5 miles (8.05 kilometres) N of Delhi, Louisiana.

== Name origin ==
The community was once named Richland but in 1929 Mary Southall, the local postmaster at that time, changed the name to Warden using the surname of a local resident. The name of the community was changed because mail was mistakenly being sent to another town called Richland.
