= Grayson House =

Grayson House may refer to:

- Grayson House (Fort Necessity, Louisiana), listed on the National Register of Historic Places in Franklin Parish, Louisiana
- Grayson House (Monroe, Louisiana), listed on the National Register of Historic Places in Ouachita Parish, Louisiana
- Dr. C. S. Grayson House, High Point, North Carolina, listed on the National Register of Historic Places in Guilford County, North Carolina
- John Grayson House, Graysontown, Virginia, NRHP-listed
- Grayson-Gravely House, Graysontown, Virginia, NRHP-listed
