= Elections in Louisiana =

Between the 2000 and 2010 censuses, New Orleans's population fell from 484,674 to 343,829, a decline of 29.1 percent. Much of the population loss was attributed to Hurricane Katrina in 2005. Louisiana had voted for Republican presidential nominee George W. Bush in 2004, before the hurricane. New Orleans remained Democratic, electing Mitch Landrieu as mayor in February 2010. In 2008, Republican presidential nominee John McCain carried Louisiana, while Democratic U.S. Senator Mary Landrieu won reelection. The other senator, at the time, was Republican David Vitter.

Republicans regained control of all statewide elected executive offices when Jeff Landry succeeded John Bel Edwards as governor in January 2024. Republicans also hold two-thirds supermajorities in both chambers of the state legislature. Both U.S. Senators, Bill Cassidy and John Kennedy, are Republicans. Republicans also hold four of the six U.S. Representative seats from Louisiana. Every statewide office is held by a Republican, and both chambers of the state legislature are majority Republican. By contrast, in 1960, not a single Republican served in either house of the Louisiana legislature. The first Republicans to serve in the legislature since Reconstruction were not elected until 1964, and both—Morley A. Hudson and Taylor W. O'Hearn—came from Shreveport.

In 2010, several Democrats switched parties bringing the statehouse under Republican control. In 2011, the special election victories of Fred Mills and Jonathan Perry switched the balance of power in the state senate, leaving Republicans in control of the state legislature for the first time since Reconstruction. Also, the party switch of Attorney General Buddy Caldwell caused the Republican party to control every statewide office. However, this was broken in 2015, when Democrat John Bel Edwards won the governor's race.

Republicans won the first Senate seat since Reconstruction in 2004, with the election of David Vitter. He became the first popularly elected Republican Senator as well. In 2014, Republicans won both Senate seats for the first time since 1872.

United States presidential election results for Louisiana
Year	Republican / Whig		Democratic		Third party(ies)	
Year	No.	%	No.	%	No.	%
1828	4,082	46.99%	4,605	53.01%	0	0.00%
1832	2,429	38.33%	3,908	61.67%	0	0.00%
1836	3,583	48.26%	3,842	51.74%	0	0.00%
1840	11,296	59.73%	7,616	40.27%	0	0.00%
1844	13,083	48.70%	13,782	51.30%	0	0.00%
1848	18,487	54.59%	15,379	45.41%	0	0.00%
1852	17,255	48.06%	18,647	51.94%	0	0.00%
1856	0	0.00%	22,164	51.70%	20,709	48.30%
1860	0	0.00%	7,625	15.10%	42,885	84.90%
1868	33,263	29.31%	80,225	70.69%	0	0.00%
1872	71,663	55.69%	57,029	44.31%	0	0.00%
1876	75,315	51.65%	70,508	48.35%	0	0.00%
1880	38,978	37.31%	65,047	62.27%	437	0.42%
1884	46,347	42.37%	62,594	57.22%	458	0.42%
1888	30,660	26.46%	85,032	73.37%	199	0.17%
1892	26,963	23.47%	87,926	76.53%	0	0.00%
1896	22,037	21.81%	77,175	76.38%	1,834	1.82%
1900	14,234	20.96%	53,668	79.03%	4	0.01%
1904	5,205	9.66%	47,708	88.50%	995	1.85%
1908	8,958	11.93%	63,568	84.63%	2,591	3.45%
1912	3,833	4.84%	60,871	76.81%	14,544	18.35%
1916	6,466	6.95%	79,875	85.90%	6,641	7.14%
1920	38,538	30.49%	87,519	69.24%	339	0.27%
1924	24,670	20.23%	93,218	76.44%	4,063	3.33%
1928	51,160	23.70%	164,655	76.29%	18	0.01%
1932	18,853	7.01%	249,418	92.79%	533	0.20%
1936	36,791	11.16%	292,894	88.82%	93	0.03%
1940	52,446	14.09%	319,751	85.88%	108	0.03%
1944	67,750	19.39%	281,564	80.59%	69	0.02%
1948	72,657	17.45%	136,344	32.75%	207,335	49.80%
1952	306,925	47.08%	345,027	52.92%	0	0.00%
1956	329,047	53.28%	243,977	39.51%	44,520	7.21%
1960	230,980	28.59%	407,339	50.42%	169,572	20.99%
1964	509,225	56.81%	387,068	43.19%	0	0.00%
1968	257,535	23.47%	309,615	28.21%	530,300	48.32%
1972	686,852	65.32%	298,142	28.35%	66,497	6.32%
1976	587,446	45.95%	661,365	51.73%	29,628	2.32%
1980	792,853	51.20%	708,453	45.75%	47,285	3.05%
1984	1,037,299	60.77%	651,586	38.18%	17,937	1.05%
1988	883,702	54.27%	717,460	44.06%	27,040	1.66%
1992	733,386	40.97%	815,971	45.58%	240,660	13.44%
1996	712,586	39.94%	927,837	52.01%	143,536	8.05%
2000	927,871	52.55%	792,344	44.88%	45,441	2.57%
2004	1,102,169	56.72%	820,299	42.22%	20,638	1.06%
2008	1,148,275	58.56%	782,989	39.93%	29,497	1.50%
2012	1,152,262	57.78%	809,141	40.58%	32,662	1.64%
2016	1,178,638	58.09%	780,154	38.45%	70,240	3.46%
2020	1,255,776	58.46%	856,034	39.85%	36,252	1.69%
2024	1,208,505	60.22%	766,870	38.21%	31,600	1.57%

== Louisiana primary ==
Louisiana introduced its two-round system for state elections in 1975 under Governor Edwin Edwards. The first round is commonly called the Louisiana primary or jungle primary. All candidates for an office appear on the same ballot, regardless of party affiliation. A candidate who receives a majority wins outright; otherwise, the two candidates receiving the most votes advance to a runoff.

The system remains in use for gubernatorial, state legislative and most other state and local elections, but not presidential elections. It was first used for congressional elections in 1978. In Foster v. Love (1997), the U.S. Supreme Court ruled that Louisiana could not conclude congressional elections in October, before the November election day established by federal law. Congressional elections used party primaries in 2008 and 2010. On election day, all candidates for the same office appear together on the ballot, often including several candidates from each major party. If one candidate receives over half of the vote in the first round, that candidate wins outright. Otherwise, the top two candidates, regardless of partisan affiliation, proceed to a runoff election.

This primary system is used for state, parish, municipal, and congressional races, but is not used for presidential elections. Louisiana's unique primary system was instituted in 1975 by Democratic governor Edwin Edwards. Until 1997, the open primary election was held in October, meaning that no election would be held in November if the leading candidate won over 50 percent of the vote in October. Between 2008 and 2010, federal races did not use the jungle primary system.

Though strictly speaking it occurs during the general election and so is not a primary election, the general election serves much the same role as a primary if no candidate wins a majority. If no candidate wins a simple majority in the first round, there is a runoff one month later between the top two candidates to determine the winner. This system is also used for United States Senate special elections in Mississippi and Texas, and all special elections for partisan offices in Georgia. It is also used for municipal elections in Chicago.

In May 2005, Louisiana passed a law moving the primary back to October, with provisions intended to follow federal law. In June 2006, Louisiana Governor Kathleen Blanco signed Senate Bill No. 18 (later Act No. 560) into law, which took effect in 2008 and returned Congressional races to the closed primary system.

In 2010, the legislature voted to revert federal elections to the nonpartisan blanket primary system with the passage of House Bill 292, which was signed into law by Governor Bobby Jindal on June 25, 2010. Since Louisiana's primary is virtually identical to the Washington state primary system, which was upheld by the US Supreme Court in Washington State Grange v. Washington State Republican Party (2008), it appears to satisfy constitutional concerns.

Louisiana reverted to semi-open party primaries for Congressional elections starting in 2026, with unaffiliated voters allowed to choose which primary they wish to vote in.

=== Comparison with other voting models ===
The Louisiana primary is a two-round system. The other popular version is the nonpartisan blanket primary (or top two primary) currently used in Washington and California. In both models, all candidates regardless of party identification run against each other in the first round, and (usually) the top two run against each other in a second round. The differences are:

- In the top two system there is always a second round even if the leader gets a simple majority.
- The first round in the Louisiana primary (for governor and other statewide officials) is held in October, and the runoff is about a month later. The top two primary holds the second round on election day in November and holds the first round months earlier.

== Administration ==
The only party labels originally permitted under Louisiana law were Democratic, Republican, and No Party; however, as of 2008, candidates may take the identity of any "registered political party". The primary has been used in statewide elections since 1975. The system was designed by then-Governor Edwin Edwards after he had to run in two grueling rounds of the Democratic Primary in 1971 (he won the primary runoff by 4,488 votes over then-state Senator J. Bennett Johnston) before facing a general election against a well-funded and well-rested Republican, Dave Treen. (Treen was elected governor under the new system in 1979, defeating five major Democratic candidates.)

Louisiana is one of only five states that elects its state officials in odd-numbered years. Louisiana holds elections for these offices every four years in the year preceding a presidential election.

Louisiana is one of 18 states with separate elections for governor and lieutenant governor, a process that has resulted in governor-lieutenant governor pairs from different parties.

Between the passage of the Voting Rights Act of 1965 and Shelby County v. Holder (a 2013 Supreme Court case), changes to Louisiana election law required preclearance with the United States Department of Justice. In a 2020 study, Louisiana was ranked as the 24th hardest state for citizens to vote in.

As of 2024, Louisiana is the only remaining state without auditable paper ballots, an established best practice for recounts and audits, in any jurisdiction.

== See also ==
- New Orleans mayoral elections
- Political party strength in Louisiana
- 2020 Louisiana elections
- United States presidential elections in Louisiana
