= Winnsboro Commercial Historic District =

Historic district in Louisiana, United States

- U.S. National Register of Historic Places
- U.S. Historic district
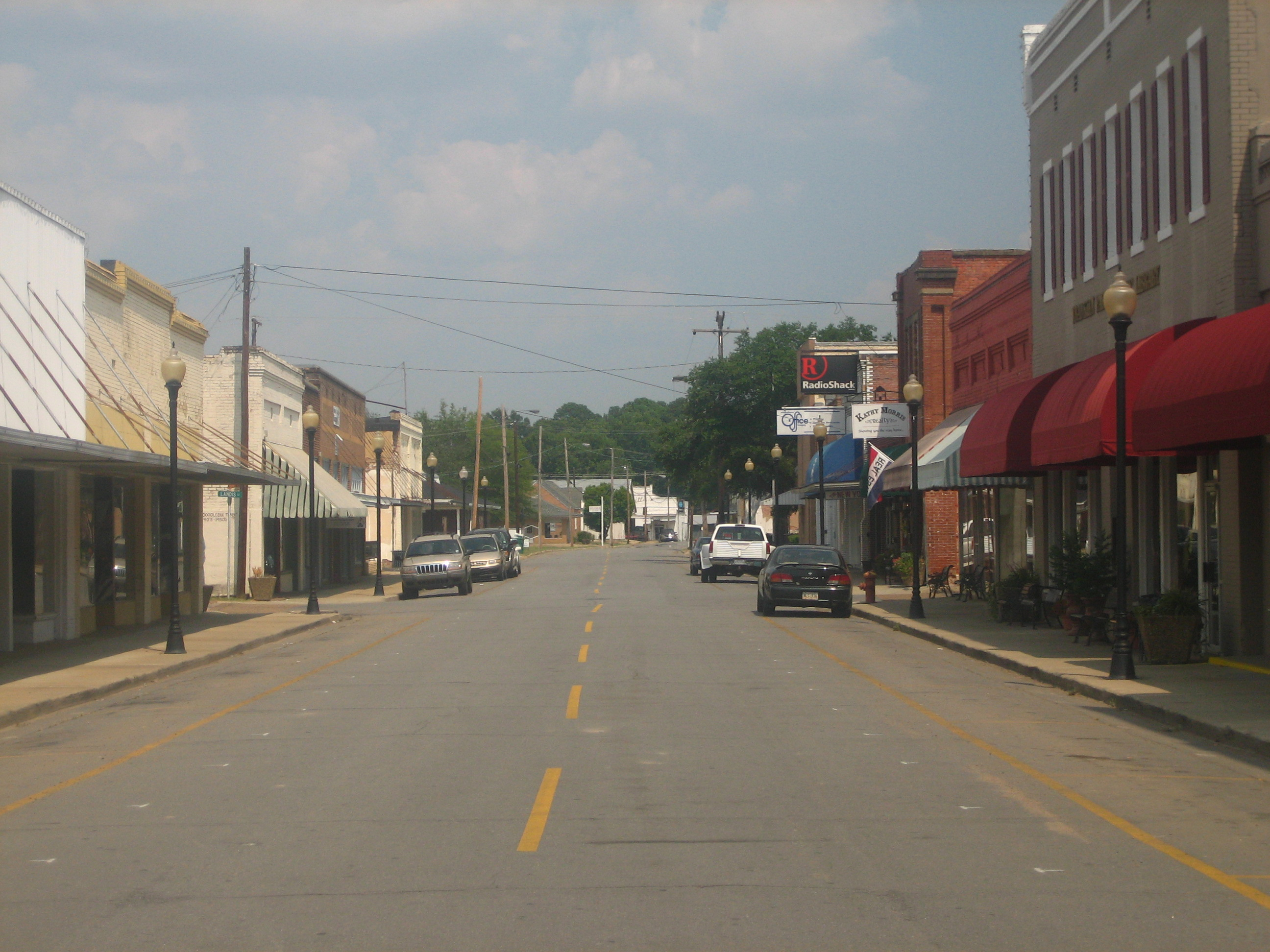
- A view of Prairie Street

- Location within Louisiana Location within the United States
- Location: Prairie Street, Winnsboro, Louisiana
- Coordinates: 32°09′52″N 91°43′07″W
- Area: 5.2 acres (2.1 ha)
- Architectural style: Colonial Revival, Early Commercial
- NRHP reference No.: 82002774
- Added to NRHP: July 9, 1982

The Winnsboro Commercial Historic District is a 5.2 acres (2.1 ha) historic district located along Prairie Street in Winnsboro in Franklin Parish, Louisiana.

When first created, the district comprised a total of 31 structures, mainly one-story brick commercial buildings, of which 20 were considered contributing properties. After a reexamination, the district now comprises 22 contributing properties on a total of 28 buildings.

The historic district was listed on the National Register of Historic Places on July 9, 1982.

== Contributing Properties ==
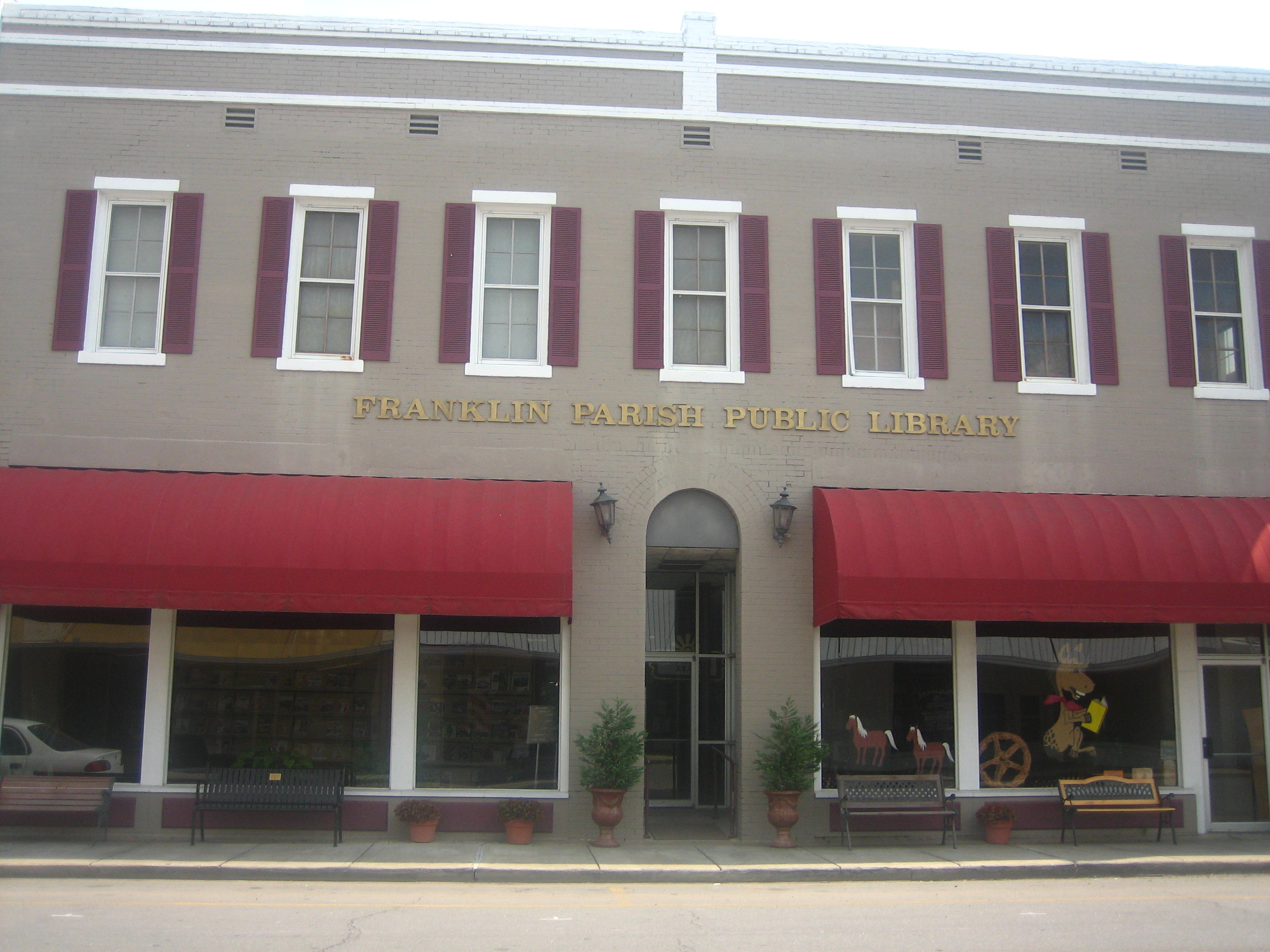
Franklin Parish Library at 705 Prairie Street

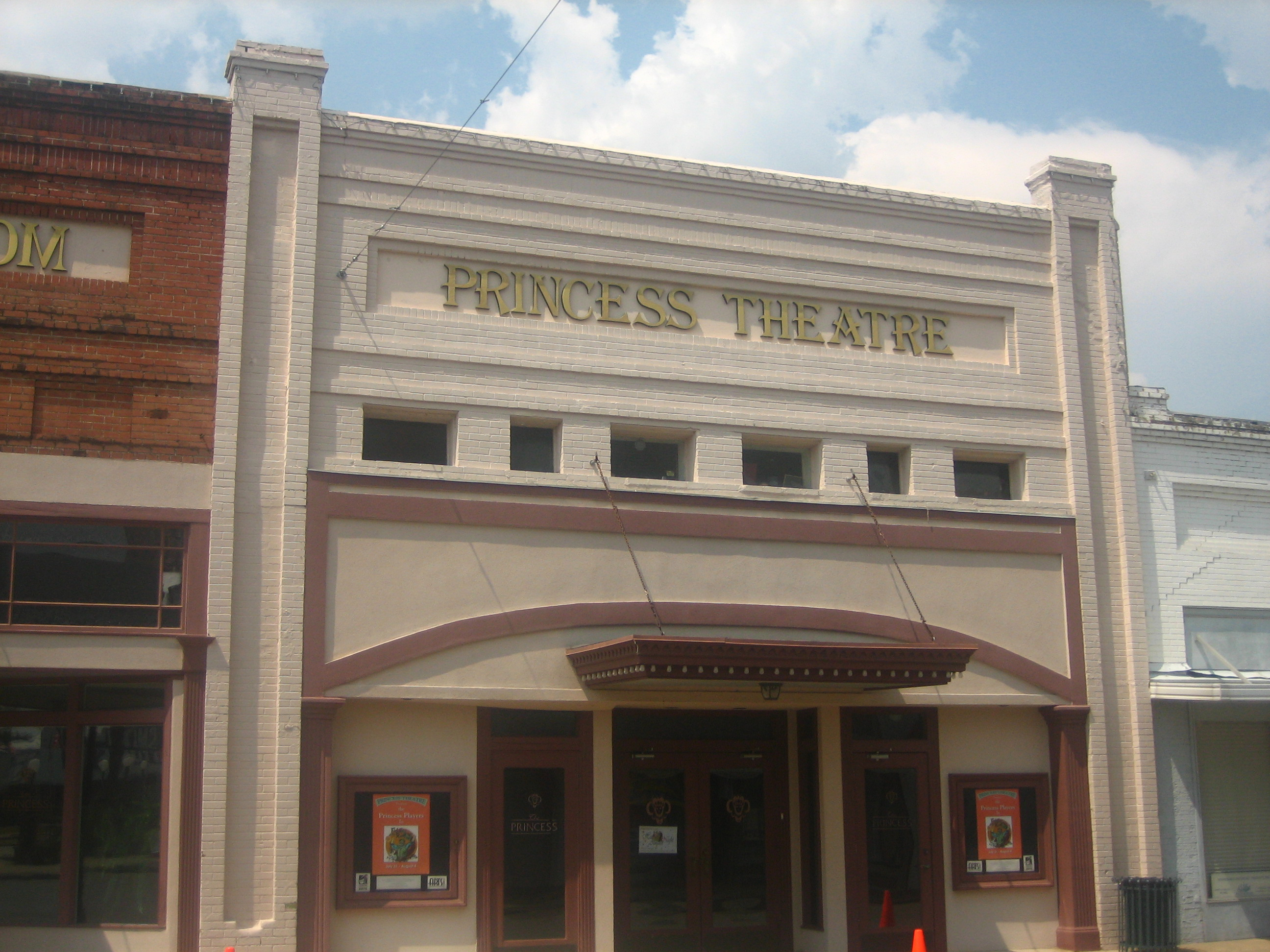
Princess Theater at 714 Prairie Street

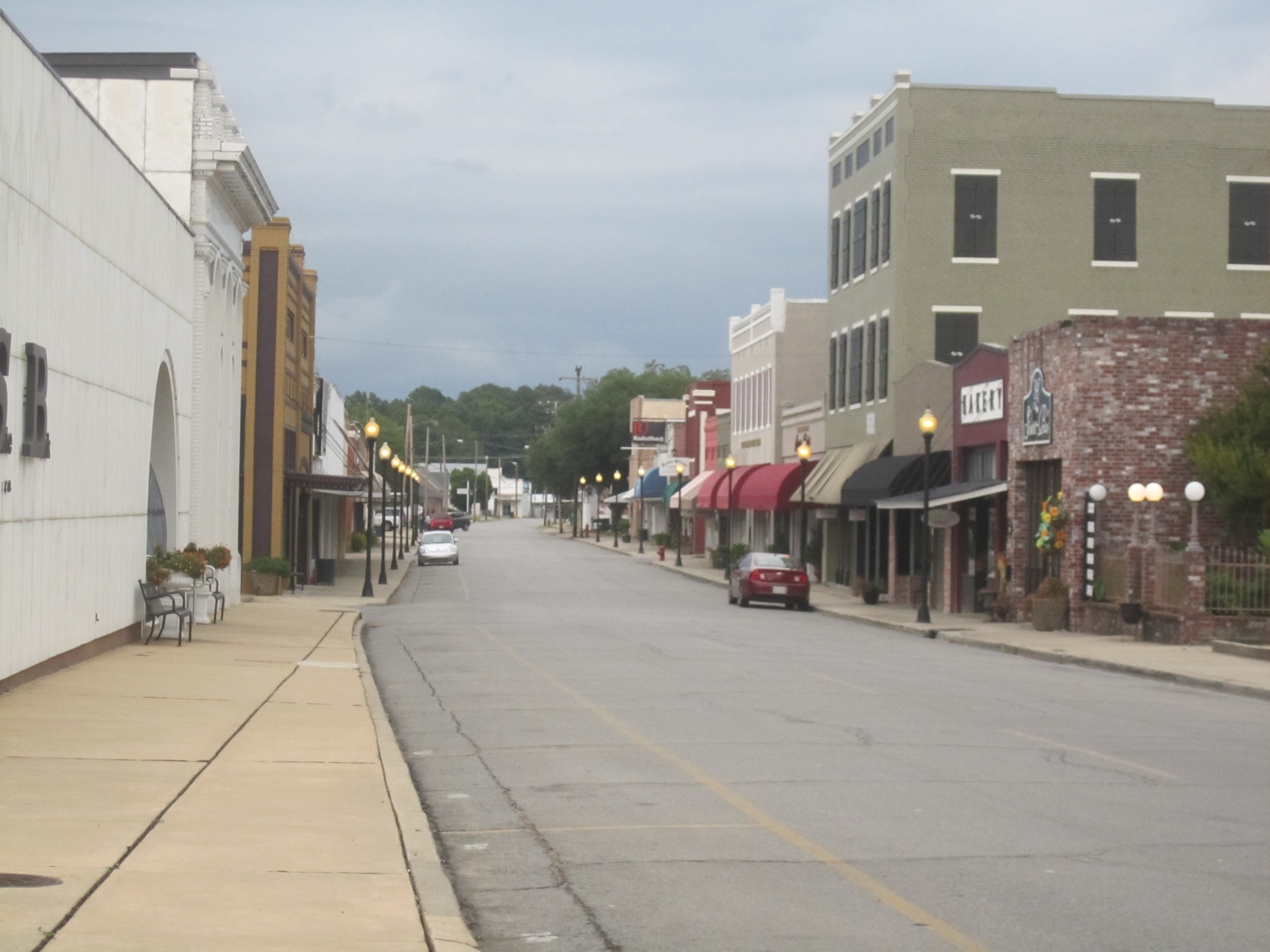
A view of Prairie Street

The historical district contains a total of 22 contributing properties, built between c.1905 and c.1945:

- Building at 600-604 Prairie Street, 32°09′53″N 91°43′04″W, built c.1915.
- Building at 608 Prairie Street, 32°09′53″N 91°43′05″W, built 1911. No more existing
- Building at 612-614 Prairie Street, 32°09′53″N 91°43′06″W, built c.1945.
- Building at 616 Prairie Street, 32°09′52″N 91°43′06″W, built c.1925.
- Building at 618 Prairie Street, 32°09′53″N 91°43′07″W, built c.1915.
- Building at 702 Prairie Street, 32°09′52″N 91°43′08″W, built c.1915.
- Building at 710 Prairie Street, 32°09′52″N 91°43′09″W, built c.1915.
- Princess Theater, at 714 Prairie Street, 32°09′52″N 91°43′09″W, built c.1915.
- Princess Room, at 720 Prairie Street, 32°09′52″N 91°43′10″W, built c.1915.
- Building at 503-505 Prairie Street, 32°09′51″N 91°43′01″W, built 1920s.
- Old Post Office, at 513 Prairie Street, 32°09′51″N 91°43′03″W, built 1936. Since 2010 this has been home of the Old Post Office Museum.
- Building at 607 Prairie Street, 32°09′51″N 91°43′05″W, built c.1915.
- Building at 611 Prairie Street, 32°09′51″N 91°43′05″W, built c.1915.
- Building at 613 Prairie Street, 32°09′51″N 91°43′06″W, built c.1905.
- Building at 617-621 Prairie Street, 32°09′51″N 91°43′06″W, built c.1945.
- Building at 623 Prairie Street, 32°09′51″N 91°43′07″W, built c.1905.
- Building at 701-703 Prairie Street, 32°09′51″N 91°43′07″W, built c.1915.
- Franklin Parish Public Library, at 705 Prairie Street, 32°09′51″N 91°43′08″W, built c.1915.
- Commercial Building #1, 32°09′51″N 91°43′09″W, built c.1915. Now hosting the Franklin Parish Library Learning Center.
- Building at 713-717 Prairie Street, 32°09′51″N 91°43′09″W, built c.1915.
- Building at 719-721 Prairie Street, 32°09′51″N 91°43′10″W, built c.1915.
- Building at 801-803 Prairie Street, 32°09′51″N 91°43′10″W, built c.1915.

== See also ==
- National Register of Historic Places listings in Franklin Parish, Louisiana
