= Jackson House (Winnsboro, Louisiana) =

Historic house in Louisiana, United States

- U.S. National Register of Historic Places
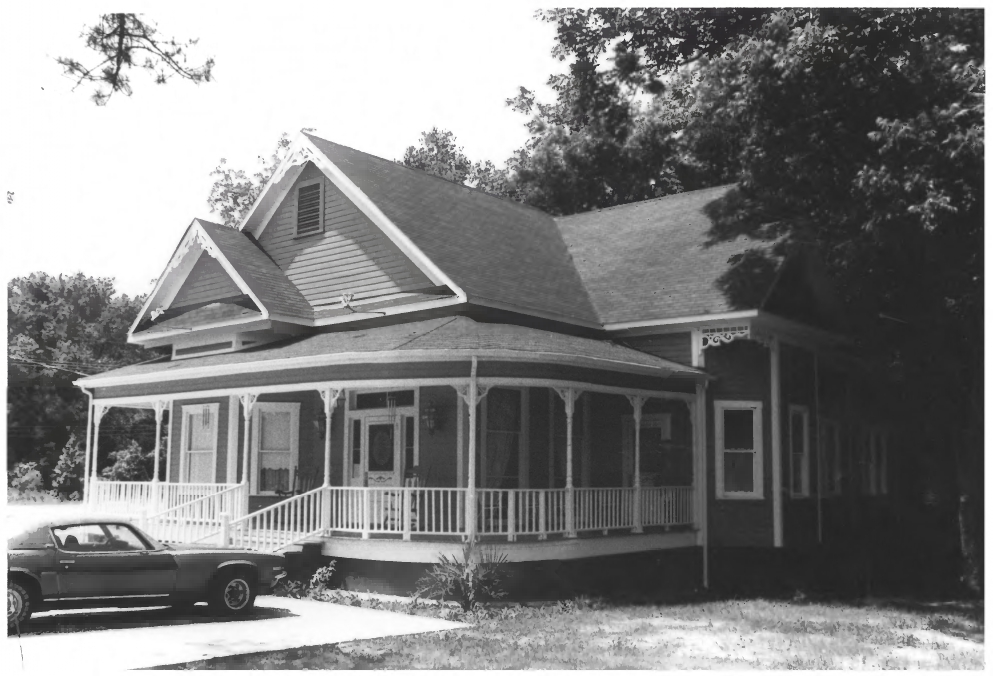

- Location within Louisiana Location within the United States
- Location: 703 Jackson Street, Winnsboro, Louisiana
- Coordinates: 32°09′59″N 91°42′50″W
- Area: 0.25 acres (0.10 ha)
- Built: 1900
- Architectural style: Queen Anne Revival
- NRHP reference No.: 82002773
- Added to NRHP: September 21, 1982

The Jackson House is a historic house located at 703 Jackson Street in Winnsboro in Franklin Parish, Louisiana.

Built in 1900 in Queen Anne style, the house is distinguished by "three semi-hexagonal bays set beneath gables, its curving Eastlake front gallery, and its decoratively cut brackets and gable aprons. There is also a large forward facing gable on the front and side facades which encompasses the smaller gable over the bay. The house also features plate glass windows, clapboard sheathing, and Colonial Revival mantels."

It was moved to its present location in 1980 when widening of Louisiana Highway 165 endangered the building. In 1982, it was used as a restaurant.

The house was listed on the National Register of Historic Places on September 21, 1982.

== See also ==
- Jackson Street Historic District: adjacent to the house
- National Register of Historic Places listings in Franklin Parish, Louisiana
