= Franklin Parish School Board =

School district in Louisiana, United States

Address
- 7293 Prairie Road Winnsboro, Louisiana, 71295; United States
- Coordinates: 32.1523°N 91.7282°W

District information
- Type: Public
- Grades: PreK–12
- NCES District ID: 2200660

Students and staff
- Students: 2,842 (2020–2021)
- Teachers: 182.74 (on an FTE basis)
- Staff: 203.09 (on an FTE basis)
- Student–teacher ratio: 15.55:1

Other information
- Website: www.fpsb.us

Franklin Parish School Board is a school district headquartered in Winnsboro, Louisiana, United States. The district serves all of Franklin Parish.

The Franklin Parish superintendent is John Gullet, a former superintendent of Caldwell Parish Schools.

== School uniforms ==
The district requires all students to wear school uniforms.

== Schools ==
=== High schools ===
- Franklin Parish High School (Winnsboro)
  - Formed in 2005 with the consolidations of Crowville and Winnsboro high schools.

=== Pre-K–8 schools ===
- Baskin School (Baskin)
  - The school, initially an elementary and middle school began in the latter part of the 1800s, with Cumming's Gin and a facility on a private property housing initial classes. A building made of brick opened in 1916. 1920 was the year that the first class graduated. The 1926 Baskin High School Building opened, with senior high school becoming a part of the school. In 1977 it moved to a different facility. The high school division closed in 1997 and it became a PreKindergarten through 8th grade facility. The 1926 building, which had been listed on the National Register of Historic Places, was demolished in 2021.
- Crowville School (Crowville)
- Fort Necessity Junior High School (Fort Necessity)
- Gilbert Junior High School (Gilbert)

=== Elementary schools ===
- PreK-5: Winnsboro Elementary School (Winnsboro)

=== Alternative schools ===
- Horace G. White Sr. Learning Center

=== Former schools ===
- Crowville High School (Crowville) - Closed in 2005 with the formation of Franklin Parish High School
- Winnsboro High School (Winnsboro) - Closed in 2005 with the formation of Franklin Parish High School
- Ward III School
