= 1896 United States presidential election in Louisiana =

- November 3, 1896

Nominee	William Jennings Bryan	William McKinley
Party	Democratic	Republican
Alliance	Populist
Home state	Nebraska	Ohio
Running mate	Arthur Sewall (Democratic); Thomas E. Watson (Populist)	Garret Hobart
Electoral vote	8	0
Popular vote	77,175	22,037
Percentage	76.38%	21.81%
Parish results
Bryan
40–50%
50–60%
60–70%
70–80%
80–90%
90–100%
McKinley
50–60%
60–70%
70–80%
80–90%
President before election
Grover Cleveland
Democratic
Elected President
William McKinley
Republican

The 1896 United States presidential election in Louisiana took place on November 3, 1896. All contemporary 45 states were part of the 1896 United States presidential election. State voters chose eight electors to the Electoral College, which selected the president and vice president.

Following the overthrow of Reconstruction Republican government, Louisiana, like most of the former Confederacy, established a Democratic-dominated but highly fraudulent political system that would from 1890 be challenged by the rise of the Populist Party due to declining conditions for farmers. Both the Populists and the earlier Greenback Party — who shared key leaders like James B. Weaver — would be supported by the state Republican Party. At the same time, outside of Acadiana — where French Catholic beliefs produced less hardline attitudes towards black voting — intimidation was already either drastically reducing the number of black voters or counting them for Democrats hostile to their interests.

By the 1890s the Louisiana Republican Party was deeply divided between “black and tans” and an insurgent “lily white” faction led by Acadian sugar planters, and the state Democratic Party was divided less deeply between pro- and anti-lottery factions. To avert the fragmented 1892 gubernatorial election, both Republican factions would organize a fusion with the Populist Party, who had run a separate candidate that year. This fusion ticket, headed by sugar planter John Pharr, would be denied according to later analysis by the persistent electoral fraud, and in the immediate aftermath of a potential civil war due to a planned Populist march on Baton Rouge, the Democrats would pass laws to disenfranchise the remaining black voters and also many poor whites — which they would complete during the ensuing gubernatorial term.

Louisiana was won by the Democratic nominees, former U.S. Representative William Jennings Bryan of Nebraska and his running mate Arthur Sewall of Maine, though four electors would cast their vice presidential ballots for Thomas E. Watson. They defeated the Republican nominees, former Ohio Governor William McKinley and his running mate Garret Hobart of New Jersey. Bryan won the state by a landslide margin of 54.57%.

As this was the last election before disfranchising constitutional conventions ended black voting in Acadiana as well as the rest of the state, McKinley did retain overwhelming support in several sugarcane-growing parishes opposed to the anti-tariff Democratic policy.

Bryan would later win Louisiana against McKinley again four years later and would later win it again in 1908 against William Howard Taft.

== Results ==
1896 United States presidential election in Louisiana
Party	Candidate	Votes	Percentage	Electoral votes
Democratic	William Jennings Bryan	77,175	76.38%	4
Populist	William Jennings Bryan	0	0.00%	4
Total	William Jennings Bryan	77,175	76.38%	8
Republican	William McKinley	22,037	21.81%	0
National Democratic	John M. Palmer	1,834	1.82%	0
Totals		101,046	100.00%	8
Voter turnout				—

=== Results by parish ===
1896 United States presidential election in Louisiana by parish
Parish	William Jennings Bryan Democratic		William McKinley Republican		John McAuley Palmer National Democratic		Margin		Total votes cast
Parish	#	%	#	%	#	%	#	%	Total votes cast
Acadia	1,082	81.54%	234	17.63%	11	0.83%	848	63.90%	1,327
Ascension	737	49.07%	722	48.07%	43	2.86%	15	1.00%	1,502
Assumption	344	23.66%	1,070	73.59%	40	2.75%	-726	-49.93%	1,454
Avoyelles	1,657	88.00%	214	11.36%	12	0.64%	1,443	76.63%	1,883
Bienville	1,491	96.01%	51	3.28%	11	0.71%	1,440	92.72%	1,553
Bossier	1,146	97.28%	22	1.87%	10	0.85%	1,124	95.42%	1,178
Caddo	1,812	83.70%	285	13.16%	68	3.14%	1,527	70.53%	2,165
Calcasieu	2,658	74.27%	891	24.90%	30	0.84%	1,767	49.37%	3,579
Caldwell	610	95.46%	26	4.07%	3	0.47%	584	91.39%	639
Cameron	251	85.37%	37	12.59%	6	2.04%	214	72.79%	294
Catahoula	811	91.33%	74	8.33%	3	0.34%	737	83.00%	888
Claiborne	1,757	95.80%	53	2.89%	24	1.31%	1,704	92.91%	1,834
Concordia	1,085	92.58%	80	6.83%	7	0.60%	1,005	85.75%	1,172
De Soto	1,940	91.55%	153	7.22%	26	1.23%	1,787	84.33%	2,119
East Baton Rouge	1,412	68.38%	595	28.81%	58	2.81%	817	39.56%	2,065
East Carroll	235	52.93%	185	41.67%	24	5.41%	50	11.26%	444
East Feliciana	1,548	98.47%	15	0.95%	9	0.57%	1,533	97.52%	1,572
Franklin	871	94.88%	28	3.05%	19	2.07%	843	91.83%	918
Grant	780	85.15%	123	13.43%	13	1.42%	657	71.72%	916
Iberia	939	70.02%	391	29.16%	11	0.82%	548	40.87%	1,341
Iberville	358	36.68%	600	61.48%	18	1.84%	-242	-24.80%	976
Jackson	705	97.24%	18	2.48%	2	0.28%	687	94.76%	725
Jefferson	1,383	79.30%	352	20.18%	9	0.52%	1,031	59.12%	1,744
Lafayette	825	81.68%	167	16.53%	18	1.78%	658	65.15%	1,010
Lafourche	1,129	73.94%	386	25.28%	12	0.79%	743	48.66%	1,527
Lincoln	1,241	95.02%	40	3.06%	25	1.91%	1,201	91.96%	1,306
Livingston	693	90.23%	72	9.38%	3	0.39%	621	80.86%	768
Madison	1,248	92.04%	96	7.08%	12	0.88%	1,152	84.96%	1,356
Morehouse	853	94.15%	46	5.08%	7	0.77%	807	89.07%	906
Natchitoches	1,656	98.10%	23	1.36%	9	0.53%	1,633	96.74%	1,688
Orleans	17,487	65.81%	8,295	31.22%	789	2.97%	9,192	34.59%	26,571
Ouachita	2,712	96.31%	93	3.30%	11	0.39%	2,619	93.00%	2,816
Plaquemines	1,502	73.16%	540	26.30%	11	0.54%	962	46.86%	2,053
Pointe Coupee	773	64.04%	410	33.97%	24	1.99%	363	30.07%	1,207
Rapides	2,600	93.56%	142	5.11%	37	1.33%	2,458	88.45%	2,779
Red River	832	96.41%	26	3.01%	5	0.58%	806	93.40%	863
Richland	706	90.75%	61	7.84%	11	1.41%	645	82.90%	778
Sabine	1,469	97.22%	36	2.38%	6	0.40%	1,433	94.84%	1,511
Saint Bernard	569	89.47%	66	10.38%	1	0.16%	503	79.09%	636
Saint Charles	125	29.90%	282	67.46%	11	2.63%	-157	-37.56%	418
Saint Helena	522	88.62%	59	10.02%	8	1.36%	463	78.61%	589
Saint James	210	12.57%	1,417	84.85%	43	2.57%	-1,207	-72.28%	1,670
Saint John the Baptist	180	24.32%	539	72.84%	21	2.84%	-359	-48.51%	740
Saint Landry	1,786	87.04%	242	11.79%	24	1.17%	1,544	75.24%	2,052
Saint Martin	679	89.11%	76	9.97%	7	0.92%	603	79.13%	762
Saint Mary	591	49.25%	580	48.33%	29	2.42%	11	0.92%	1,200
Saint Tammany	636	60.80%	317	30.31%	93	8.89%	319	30.50%	1,046
Tangipahoa	1,429	76.99%	395	21.28%	32	1.72%	1,034	55.71%	1,856
Tensas	1,108	82.13%	236	17.49%	5	0.37%	872	64.64%	1,349
Terrebonne	597	62.12%	348	36.21%	16	1.66%	249	25.91%	961
Union	1,586	93.46%	86	5.07%	25	1.47%	1,500	88.39%	1,697
Vermilion	702	77.40%	196	21.61%	9	0.99%	506	55.79%	907
Vernon	697	94.57%	35	4.75%	5	0.68%	662	89.82%	737
Washington	1,168	95.11%	48	3.91%	12	0.98%	1,120	91.21%	1,228
Webster	774	88.36%	97	11.07%	5	0.57%	677	77.28%	876
West Baton Rouge	237	43.73%	279	51.48%	26	4.80%	-42	-7.75%	542
West Carroll	637	99.84%	1	0.16%	0	0.00%	636	99.69%	638
West Feliciana	919	93.58%	44	4.48%	19	1.93%	875	89.10%	982
Winn	682	93.42%	42	5.75%	6	0.82%	640	87.67%	730
Totals	77,172	76.38%	22,037	21.81%	1,834	1.82%	55,135	54.57%	101,043

== See also ==
- United States presidential elections in Louisiana
