= 1900 United States presidential election in Louisiana =

- November 6, 1900

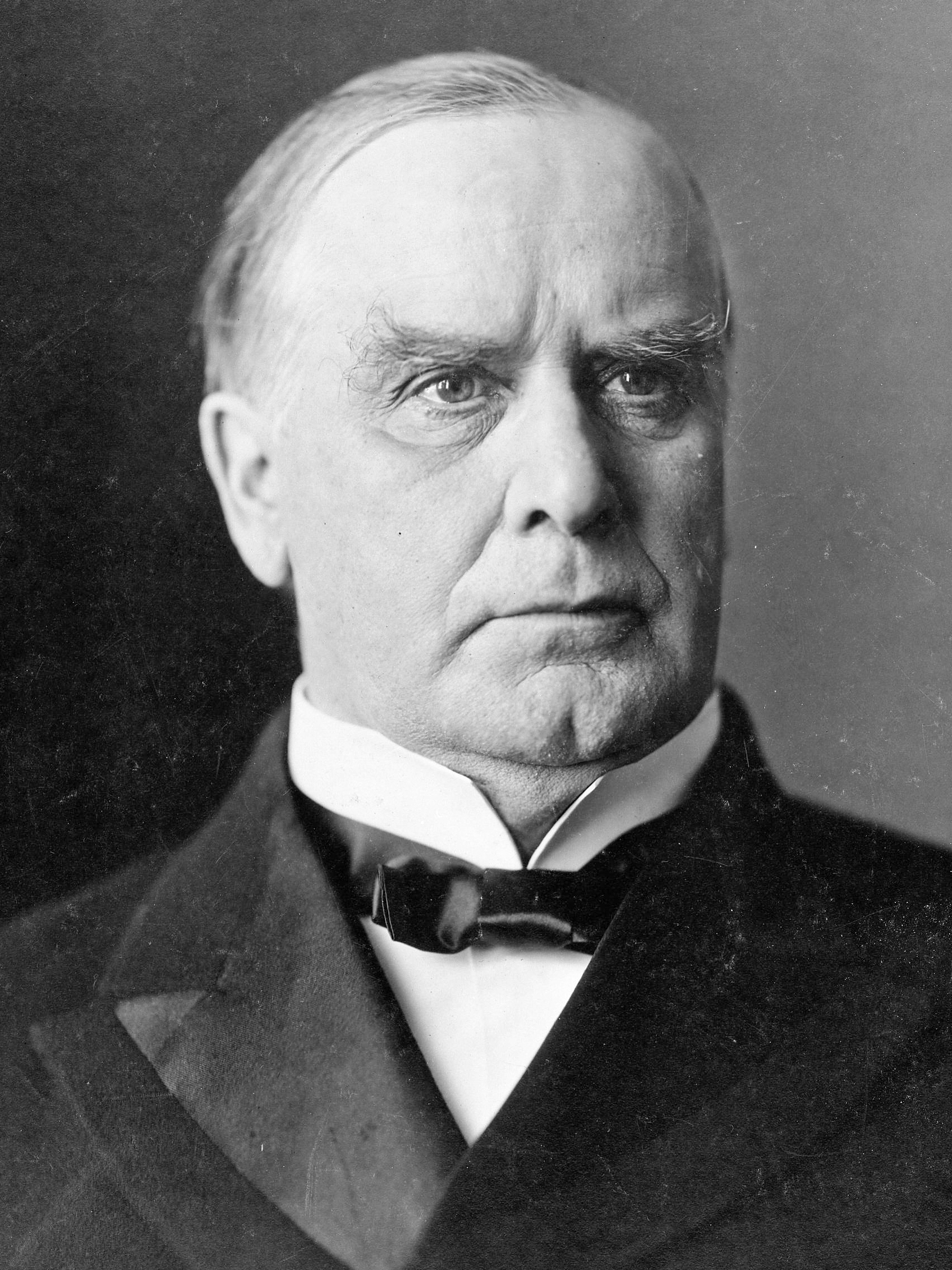
Nominee	William Jennings Bryan	William McKinley
Party	Democratic	Republican
Home state	Nebraska	Ohio
Running mate	Adlai Stevenson I	Theodore Roosevelt
Electoral vote	8	0
Popular vote	53,668	14,234
Percentage	79.03%	20.96%
Parish results
Bryan
50–60%
60–70%
70–80%
80–90%
90–100%
McKinley
50–60%
President before election
William McKinley
Republican
Elected President
William McKinley
Republican

The 1900 United States presidential election in Louisiana took place on November 6, 1900. All contemporary 45 states were part of the 1900 United States presidential election. State voters chose eight electors to the Electoral College, which selected the president and vice president.

Following the overthrow of Reconstruction Republican government, Louisiana, like most of the former Confederacy, established a Democratic-dominated but highly fraudulent political system that would, from 1890, be challenged by the rise of the Populist Party due to declining conditions for farmers. Both the Populists and the earlier Greenback Party — who shared key leaders like James B. Weaver — would be supported by the state Republican Party. At the same time, outside of Acadiana — where French Catholic beliefs produced less hardline attitudes towards black voting — intimidation was already drastically reducing the number of black voters.

Although the state GOP was deeply divided between “black and tans” and an insurgent “lily white” faction led by Acadian sugar planters, a multi-party fusion candidacy in the 1896 gubernatorial election gave a strong showing against the Democratic Party, being denied according to most analyses by the persistent fraud. Fear of a return to “carpetbag” and black rule amongst the state's plantation elite was so strong that this group radically rewrote the state's constitution in the ensuing gubernatorial term. A poll tax, a literacy test, a grandfather clause, and a secret ballot all made voting by the lower classes much more difficult, producing a reduction in the number of registered black voters by 96 percent, and virtual elimination of black voting in Acadiana until the 1950s. In the remainder of the state very few blacks could vote until after the Voting Rights Act of 1965.

In Louisiana, the Republican party lacked any white base because Louisiana completely lacked upland or German refugee whites opposed to secession. Consequently, the state after the elimination of its black electorate became a one-party state dominated by the Democratic Party. After 1900, not until 1964 would another Republican serve in the state legislature.

Louisiana was won by the Democratic nominees, former U.S. Representative William Jennings Bryan of Nebraska and his running mate Adlai Stevenson I of Illinois. They defeated the Republican nominees, incumbent President William McKinley of Ohio and his running mate Theodore Roosevelt of New York. Bryan won the state by a landslide margin of 58.07%. With 79.03% of the popular vote, Louisiana would prove to be Bryan's third strongest state in the 1900 presidential election only after South Carolina and Mississippi.

Bryan had previously won Louisiana against McKinley four years earlier and would later win the state again in 1908 against William Howard Taft. This is the last time a Republican won two terms without ever winning the state.

== Results ==
General Election Results
Party	Pledged to	Elector	Votes
Democratic Party	William Jennings Bryan	Robert H. Snyder	53,671 (Note: The parish figures add up to 53,668)
Democratic Party	William Jennings Bryan	William O. Hart	53,594
Democratic Party	William Jennings Bryan	Thomas H. Lewis	53,593
Democratic Party	William Jennings Bryan	Charles J. Theard	53,591
Democratic Party	William Jennings Bryan	Edward McCollom	53,588
Democratic Party	William Jennings Bryan	S. D. Ellis	53,563
Democratic Party	William Jennings Bryan	Allen Barksdale	53,561
Democratic Party	William Jennings Bryan	H. T. Liverman	53,559
Republican Party	William McKinley	W. G. Wyly	14,233 (Note: The parish figures add up to 14,234)
Republican Party	William McKinley	Henry McCall	14,228
Republican Party	William McKinley	Vincent Foulon	14,211
Republican Party	William McKinley	Jacob Libermuth	14,211
Republican Party	William McKinley	R. R. Stone	14,209
Republican Party	William McKinley	J. B. Slattery	14,207
Republican Party	William McKinley	Henry W. Robinson	14,205
Republican Party	William McKinley	James C. Weaks	14,202
Write-in		Scattering	4
Votes cast (Note: Based on totals for highest elector on each ticket)			67,908

=== Results by parish ===
1900 United States presidential election in Louisiana by parish
Parish	William Jennings Bryan Democratic		William McKinley Republican		Scattering		Margin		Total votes cast
Parish	#	%	#	%	#	%	#	%	Total votes cast
Acadia	577	70.02%	247	29.98%	0	0.00%	330	40.05%	824
Ascension	824	56.36%	638	43.64%	0	0.00%	186	12.72%	1,462
Assumption	584	53.53%	507	46.47%	0	0.00%	77	7.06%	1,091
Avoyelles	951	85.06%	167	14.94%	0	0.00%	784	70.13%	1,118
Bienville	889	93.19%	65	6.81%	0	0.00%	824	86.37%	954
Bossier	635	99.06%	6	0.94%	0	0.00%	629	98.13%	641
Caddo	1,338	96.05%	55	3.95%	0	0.00%	1,283	92.10%	1,393
Calcasieu	1,559	70.93%	639	29.07%	0	0.00%	920	41.86%	2,198
Caldwell	283	80.63%	68	19.37%	0	0.00%	215	61.25%	351
Cameron	185	71.98%	72	28.02%	0	0.00%	113	43.97%	257
Catahoula	526	78.51%	144	21.49%	0	0.00%	382	57.01%	670
Claiborne	885	96.30%	34	3.70%	0	0.00%	851	92.60%	919
Concordia	362	95.51%	17	4.49%	0	0.00%	345	91.03%	379
De Soto	923	98.19%	17	1.81%	0	0.00%	906	96.38%	940
East Baton Rouge	837	84.89%	149	15.11%	0	0.00%	688	69.78%	986
East Carroll	176	95.65%	8	4.35%	0	0.00%	168	91.30%	184
East Feliciana	551	96.50%	20	3.50%	0	0.00%	531	92.99%	571
Franklin	362	92.35%	30	7.65%	0	0.00%	332	84.69%	392
Grant	350	69.17%	156	30.83%	0	0.00%	194	38.34%	506
Iberia	1,030	60.66%	668	39.34%	0	0.00%	362	21.32%	1,698
Iberville	674	64.50%	371	35.50%	0	0.00%	303	29.00%	1,045
Jackson	333	80.24%	82	19.76%	0	0.00%	251	60.48%	415
Jefferson	1,282	95.60%	59	4.40%	0	0.00%	1,223	91.20%	1,341
Lafayette	696	67.31%	338	32.69%	0	0.00%	358	34.62%	1,034
Lafourche	1,230	59.77%	828	40.23%	0	0.00%	402	19.53%	2,058
Lincoln	517	89.45%	61	10.55%	0	0.00%	456	78.89%	578
Livingston	399	96.38%	15	3.62%	0	0.00%	384	92.75%	414
Madison	153	96.84%	5	3.16%	0	0.00%	148	93.67%	158
Morehouse	461	98.29%	8	1.71%	0	0.00%	453	96.59%	469
Natchitoches	845	88.20%	113	11.80%	0	0.00%	732	76.41%	958
Orleans	18,168	79.98%	4,549	20.02%	0	0.00%	13,619	59.95%	22,717
Ouachita	663	93.51%	46	6.49%	0	0.00%	617	87.02%	709
Plaquemines	567	83.14%	115	16.86%	0	0.00%	452	66.28%	682
Pointe Coupee	586	96.38%	22	3.62%	0	0.00%	564	92.76%	608
Rapides	1,420	81.52%	319	18.31%	3	0.17%	1,101	63.21%	1,742
Red River	462	98.51%	6	1.28%	1	0.21%	456	97.23%	469
Richland	304	95.90%	13	4.10%	0	0.00%	291	91.80%	317
Sabine	543	91.26%	52	8.74%	0	0.00%	491	82.52%	595
Saint Bernard	398	89.64%	46	10.36%	0	0.00%	352	79.28%	444
Saint Charles	435	90.25%	47	9.75%	0	0.00%	388	80.50%	482
Saint James	395	48.59%	418	51.41%	0	0.00%	-23	-2.83%	813
Saint John the Baptist	331	78.62%	90	21.38%	0	0.00%	241	57.24%	421
Saint Landry	1,297	84.99%	229	15.01%	0	0.00%	1,068	69.99%	1,526
Saint Martin	538	82.64%	113	17.36%	0	0.00%	425	65.28%	651
Saint Mary	818	57.44%	606	42.56%	0	0.00%	212	14.89%	1,424
Saint Tammany	515	76.41%	159	23.59%	0	0.00%	356	52.82%	674
Tangipahoa	938	80.38%	229	19.62%	0	0.00%	709	60.75%	1,167
Tensas	212	97.70%	5	2.30%	0	0.00%	207	95.39%	217
Terrebonne	740	60.16%	490	39.84%	0	0.00%	250	20.33%	1,230
Union	750	87.72%	105	12.28%	0	0.00%	645	75.44%	855
Vermilion	625	62.75%	371	37.25%	0	0.00%	254	25.50%	996
Vernon	522	66.67%	261	33.33%	0	0.00%	261	33.33%	783
Washington	449	89.26%	54	10.74%	0	0.00%	395	78.53%	503
Webster	604	98.53%	9	1.47%	0	0.00%	595	97.06%	613
West Baton Rouge	185	82.96%	38	17.04%	0	0.00%	147	65.92%	223
West Carroll	173	98.86%	2	1.14%	0	0.00%	171	97.71%	175
West Feliciana	320	94.40%	19	5.60%	0	0.00%	301	88.79%	339
Winn	293	55.60%	234	44.40%	0	0.00%	59	11.20%	527
Saint Helena (Note: No returns were canvassed for Saint Helena Parish)	N/A	N/A	N/A	N/A	N/A	N/A	N/A	N/A	N/A
Totals	53,668	79.03%	14,234	20.96%	4	0.01%	39,434	58.07%	67,906

== See also ==
- United States presidential elections in Louisiana
