= Jackson Street Historic District =

Historic district in Louisiana, United States

- U.S. National Register of Historic Places
- U.S. Historic district
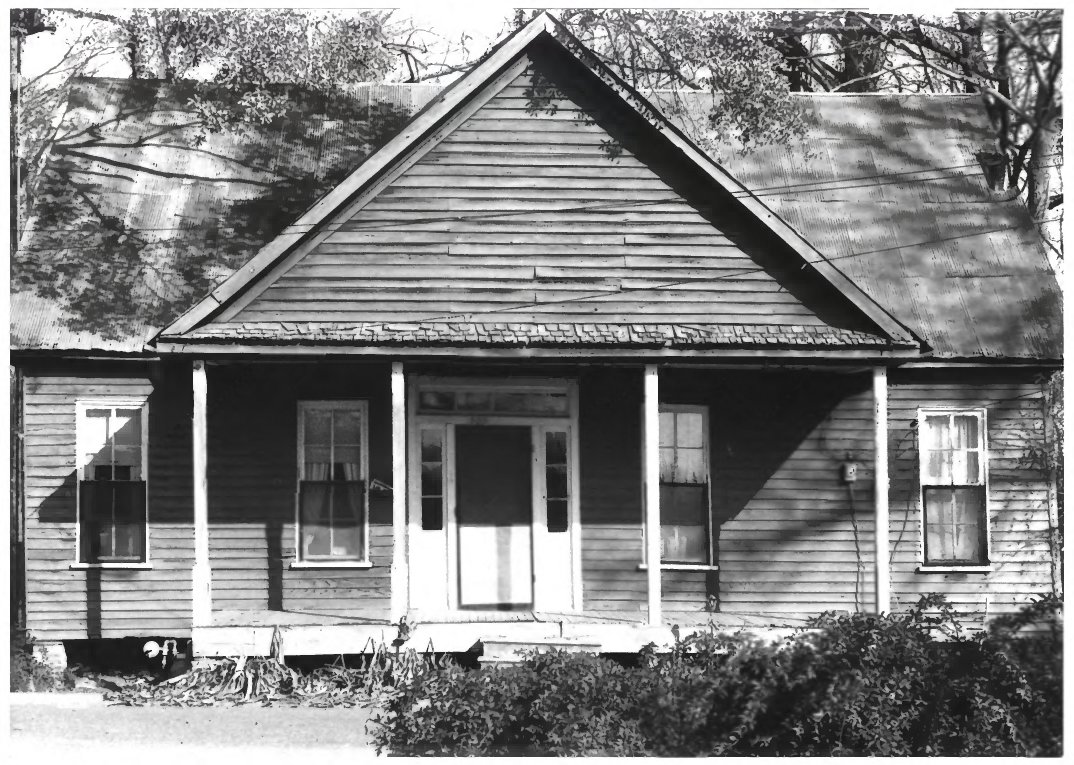

- Location within Louisiana Location within the United States
- Location: Jackson Street, Winnsboro, Louisiana
- Coordinates: 32°09′59″N 91°42′47″W
- Area: 4 acres (1.6 ha)
- Built: 1891
- Architectural style: Greek Revival, Stick-Eastlake, Queen Anne Revival
- NRHP reference No.: 82000436
- Added to NRHP: October 5, 1982

The Jackson Street Historic District located in Winnsboro, Louisiana is a 4-acre (1.6 ha) historic district which was listed on the National Register of Historic Places on October 5, 1982.

== Contributing properties ==
At the time of its enlistment it included eight contributing buildings, comprinsing three houses and five outbuildings:

- Belle Fann (1891), 32°09′58″N 91°42′46″W, a one-story, five-bay, galleried, retardaire Greek Revival building. Apparently no more standing.
- Godfrey House (1900), 32°09′57″N 91°42′47″W, a one-story, five-bay, framed, pitched-roof structure with a five-bay Eastlake gallery under a separate roof. It is now hosting the Jackson Street Guest House.
- Scott Elam House (1906), 32°09′59″N 91°42′48″W, a one-story, five-bay, framed structure with four posts supporting a central Queen Anne Revival front porch gable.
- Smokehouse (c.1900) of Belle Fann farm, hip-roofed board and batten structure
- Outhouse
- Barn (c.1900) is a board-and-batten structure with a low-pitched roof,
- Shed (c.1900)
- Maid's house (c.1900), a small one-room frame cottage.

== See also ==
- Jackson House: adjacent to the district
- National Register of Historic Places listings in Franklin Parish, Louisiana
