= Bishop House (Graysontown, Virginia) =

Historic house in Virginia, United States

- U.S. National Register of Historic Places
- Virginia Landmarks Register
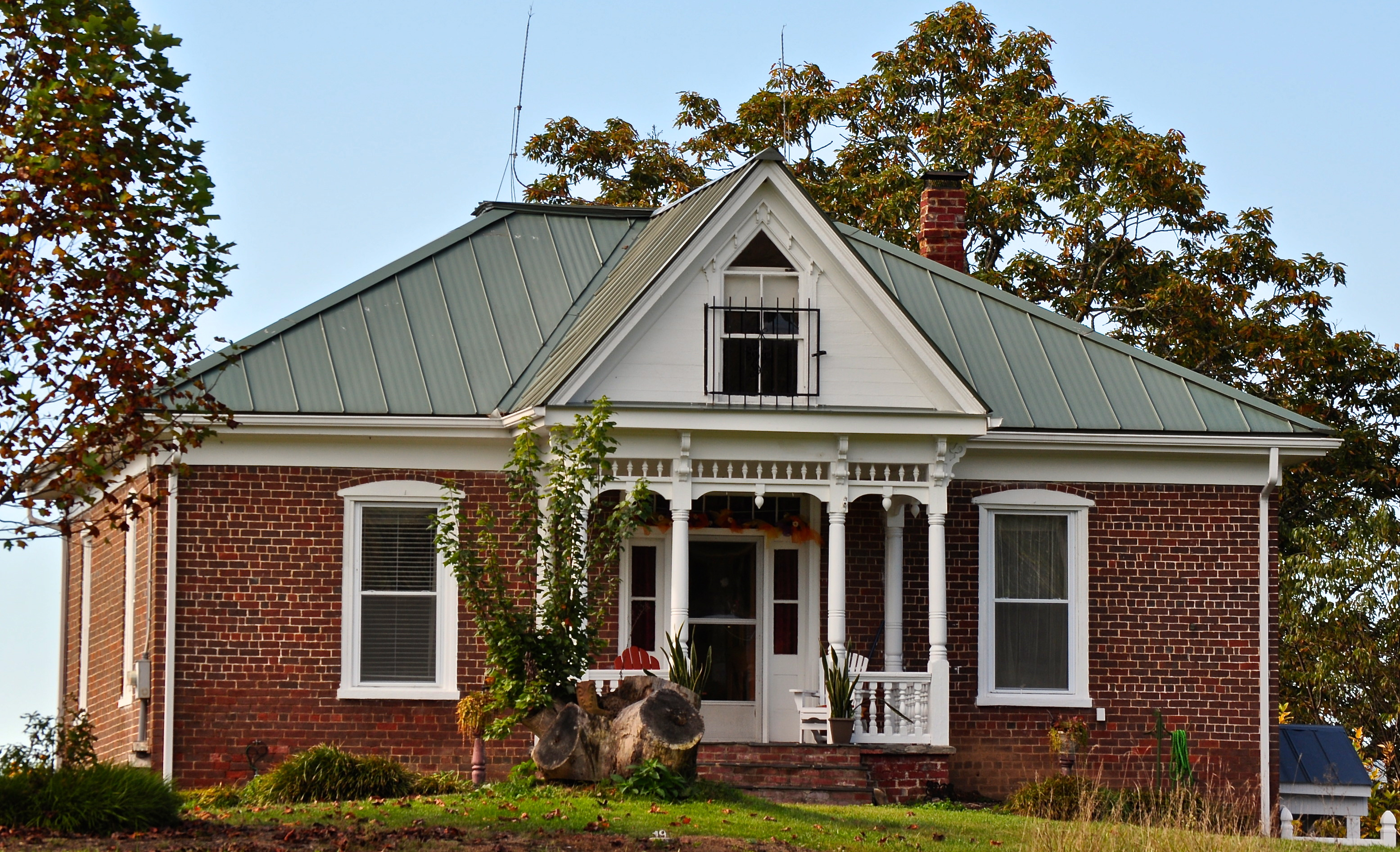
- Bishop House, October 2013

- Location within Virginia Location within the United States
- Location: 0.1 miles (0.16 km) north of the junction of VA 693 and 613, near Graysontown, Virginia
- Coordinates: 37°2′16″N 80°33′19″W
- Area: less than one acre
- Built: c. 1890
- Architectural style: Double-pile center-passage
- MPS: Montgomery County MPS
- NRHP reference No.: 89001812
- VLR No.: 060-0107

Significant dates
- Added to NRHP: November 13, 1989
- Designated VLR: June 20, 1989

Bishop House is a historic home located near Graysontown, Montgomery County, Virginia. The house was built about 1890, and is a one- to two-story, three-bay, brick dwelling with a double pile central passage plan. It has a standing seam metal gable roof. Its front porch features turned posts and a baluster bracketed spindle frieze with drop pendants, and a pointed window in the steep pedimented gable.

It was listed on the National Register of Historic Places in 1989.
