= 1908 United States presidential election in Louisiana =

- November 3, 1908
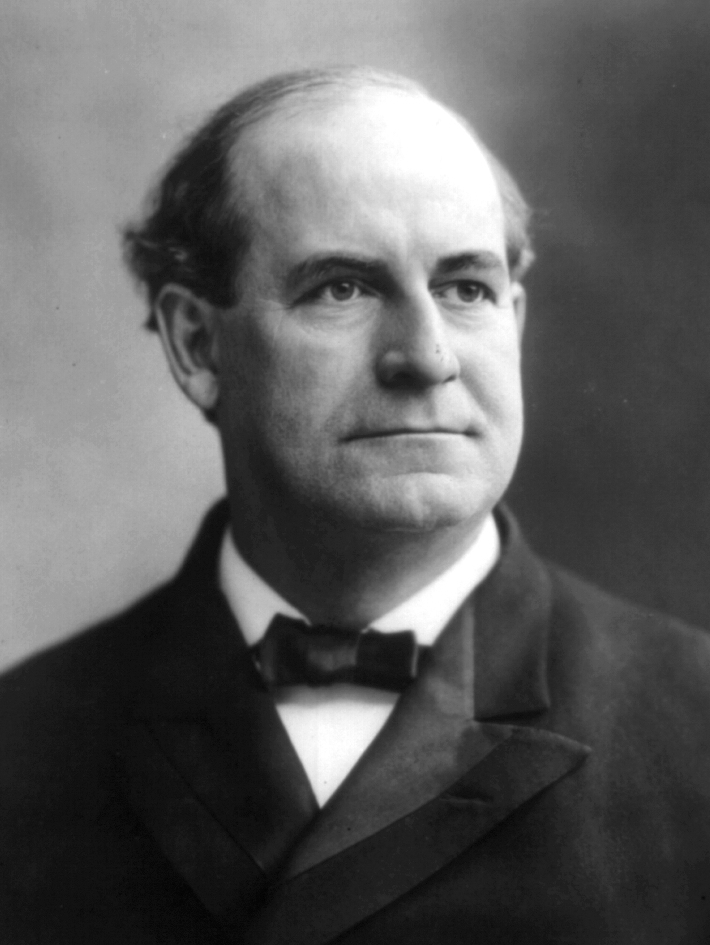

Nominee	William Jennings Bryan	William Howard Taft
Party	Democratic	Republican
Home state	Nebraska	Ohio
Running mate	John W. Kern	James S. Sherman
Electoral vote	9	0
Popular vote	63,568	8,958
Percentage	84.63%	11.93%
Parish results
Bryan
50–60%
60–70%
70–80%
80–90%
90–100%
President before election
Theodore Roosevelt
Republican
Elected President
William Howard Taft
Republican

The 1908 United States presidential election in Louisiana took place on November 3, 1908. All contemporary 46 states were part of the 1908 United States presidential election. State voters chose nine electors to the Electoral College, which selected the president and vice president.

Following the passage of a new constitution in 1898, Louisiana became a one-party state dominated by the Democratic Party. The Republican Party became moribund due to the disenfranchisement of blacks and the complete absence of other support bases as Louisiana completely lacked upland or German refugee whites opposed to secession. Despite this absolute single-party dominance, non-partisan tendencies remained strong among wealthy sugar planters in Acadiana, within the business elite of New Orleans, and even amongst the “lily-white” faction of the moribund state GOP that supported black disenfranchisement in the effort to become respectable amongst the white elite.

Following disfranchisement, the state's politics became dominated by the Choctaw Club of Louisiana, generally called the “Old Regulars”. This political machine was based in New Orleans and united with Black Belt cotton planters. Although white Republicans continued to work towards taking over Federal patronage from the “black and tans”, throughout most of the 1900s Louisiana politics was under firm Choctaw control as the Populist movement weakened with the disenfranchisement of many poor whites via the poll tax.

Louisiana was won by the Democratic nominees, former Representative William Jennings Bryan of Nebraska and his running mate John W. Kern of Indiana. They defeated the Republican candidates, United States Secretary of War William Howard Taft of Ohio and his running mate James S. Sherman of New York. Bryan won the state by a landslide margin of 72.7%.

With 84.63 percent of the popular vote, Louisiana would also prove to be Bryan's third strongest victory in terms of percentage in the popular vote only after South Carolina and Mississippi.

Bryan had previously defeated William McKinley in Louisiana in both 1896 and 1900.

== Results ==
1908 United States presidential election in Louisiana
Party	Candidate	Votes	Percentage	Electoral votes
Democratic	William Jennings Bryan	63,568	84.63%	9
Republican	William Howard Taft	8,958	11.93%	0
Socialist	Eugene V. Debs	2,514	3.35%	0
Independent	Thomas L. Hisgen	77	0.10%	0
Totals		75,117	100.00%	9
Voter turnout				—

=== Results by parish ===
1908 United States presidential election in Louisiana by parish
Parish	William Jennings Bryan Democratic		William Howard Taft Republican		Eugene Victor Debs Socialist		Thomas Louis Hisgen Independent		Margin		Total votes cast
Parish	#	%	#	%	#	%	#	%	#	%	Total votes cast
Acadia	1,017	74.07%	214	15.59%	141	10.27%	1	0.07%	803	58.49%	1,373
Ascension	551	82.61%	107	16.04%	9	1.35%	0	0.00%	444	66.57%	667
Assumption	511	71.97%	198	27.89%	1	0.14%	0	0.00%	313	44.08%	710
Avoyelles	1,240	94.87%	50	3.83%	16	1.22%	1	0.08%	1,190	91.05%	1,307
Bienville	926	82.38%	65	5.78%	131	11.65%	2	0.18%	795 (Note: In this parish where Debs ran second ahead of Taft, margin given is Bryan vote minus Debs vote and percentage margin Bryan percentage minus Debs percentage)	70.73%	1,124
Bossier	470	96.51%	8	1.64%	9	1.85%	0	0.00%	461	94.66%	487
Caddo	1,733	91.26%	125	6.58%	40	2.11%	1	0.05%	1,608	84.68%	1,899
Calcasieu	1,975	69.35%	683	23.98%	185	6.50%	5	0.18%	1,292	45.37%	2,848
Caldwell	314	79.70%	21	5.33%	58	14.72%	1	0.25%	256	64.98%	394
Cameron	280	94.28%	15	5.05%	2	0.67%	0	0.00%	265	89.23%	297
Catahoula	660	76.48%	88	10.20%	114	13.21%	1	0.12%	546	63.27%	863
Claiborne	874	93.28%	38	4.06%	24	2.56%	1	0.11%	836	89.22%	937
Concordia	288	95.05%	4	1.32%	11	3.63%	0	0.00%	277	91.42%	303
De Soto	881	93.72%	17	1.81%	41	4.36%	1	0.11%	840	89.36%	940
East Baton Rouge	1,090	91.29%	83	6.95%	20	1.68%	1	0.08%	1,007	84.34%	1,194
East Carroll	194	96.52%	6	2.99%	1	0.50%	0	0.00%	188	93.53%	201
East Feliciana	589	97.68%	12	1.99%	2	0.33%	0	0.00%	577	95.69%	603
Franklin	456	94.41%	15	3.11%	12	2.48%	0	0.00%	441	91.30%	483
Grant	388	73.90%	83	15.81%	52	9.90%	2	0.38%	305	58.10%	525
Iberia	820	68.33%	328	27.33%	52	4.33%	0	0.00%	492	41.00%	1,200
Iberville	500	91.91%	44	8.09%	0	0.00%	0	0.00%	456	83.82%	544
Jackson	493	78.88%	77	12.32%	51	8.16%	4	0.64%	416	66.56%	625
Jefferson	1,122	97.40%	30	2.60%	0	0.00%	0	0.00%	1,092	94.79%	1,152
Lafayette	725	74.28%	128	13.11%	121	12.40%	2	0.20%	597	61.17%	976
Lafourche	1,072	78.08%	296	21.56%	5	0.36%	0	0.00%	776	56.52%	1,373
Lincoln	634	89.04%	52	7.30%	26	3.65%	0	0.00%	582	81.74%	712
Livingston	448	90.14%	19	3.82%	30	6.04%	0	0.00%	418	84.10%	497
Madison	156	96.30%	6	3.70%	0	0.00%	0	0.00%	150	92.59%	162
Morehouse	458	92.15%	20	4.02%	19	3.82%	0	0.00%	438	88.13%	497
Natchitoches	792	81.06%	143	14.64%	42	4.30%	0	0.00%	649	66.43%	977
Orleans	25,678	87.77%	3,288	11.24%	253	0.86%	36	0.12%	22,390	76.53%	29,255
Ouachita	851	90.53%	60	6.38%	27	2.87%	2	0.21%	791	84.15%	940
Plaquemines	416	74.55%	127	22.76%	15	2.69%	0	0.00%	289	51.79%	558
Pointe Coupee	653	96.60%	23	3.40%	0	0.00%	0	0.00%	630	93.20%	676
Rapides	1,302	86.68%	159	10.59%	40	2.66%	1	0.07%	1,143	76.10%	1,502
Red River	386	83.19%	6	1.29%	72	15.52%	0	0.00%	314	67.67%	464
Richland	445	98.02%	9	1.98%	0	0.00%	0	0.00%	436	96.04%	454
Sabine	593	87.46%	47	6.93%	38	5.60%	0	0.00%	546	80.53%	678
Saint Bernard	356	95.19%	18	4.81%	0	0.00%	0	0.00%	338	90.37%	374
Saint Charles	215	90.72%	22	9.28%	0	0.00%	0	0.00%	193	81.43%	237
Saint Helena	281	88.92%	34	10.76%	1	0.32%	0	0.00%	247	78.16%	316
Saint James	364	73.24%	123	24.75%	8	1.61%	2	0.40%	241	48.49%	497
Saint John the Baptist	287	89.13%	33	10.25%	2	0.62%	0	0.00%	254	78.88%	322
Saint Landry	1,395	84.60%	238	14.43%	14	0.85%	2	0.12%	1,157	70.16%	1,649
Saint Martin	651	91.95%	39	5.51%	18	2.54%	0	0.00%	612	86.44%	708
Saint Mary	767	71.68%	273	25.51%	27	2.52%	3	0.28%	494	46.17%	1,070
Saint Tammany	755	80.58%	107	11.42%	73	7.79%	2	0.21%	648	69.16%	937
Tangipahoa	1,116	80.64%	240	17.34%	27	1.95%	1	0.07%	876	63.29%	1,384
Tensas	300	97.72%	7	2.28%	0	0.00%	0	0.00%	293	95.44%	307
Terrebonne	634	62.59%	372	36.72%	7	0.69%	0	0.00%	262	25.86%	1,013
Union	634	89.17%	53	7.45%	24	3.38%	0	0.00%	581	81.72%	711
Vermilion	547	72.64%	156	20.72%	50	6.64%	0	0.00%	391	51.93%	753
Vernon	618	54.21%	273	23.95%	241	21.14%	8	0.70%	345	30.26%	1,140
Washington	550	91.51%	49	8.15%	1	0.17%	1	0.17%	501	83.36%	601
Webster	853	85.73%	32	3.22%	109	10.95%	1	0.10%	744	74.78%	995
West Baton Rouge	198	95.65%	9	4.35%	0	0.00%	0	0.00%	189	91.30%	207
West Carroll	189	76.83%	11	4.47%	46	18.70%	0	0.00%	143	58.13%	246
West Feliciana	350	94.09%	22	5.91%	0	0.00%	0	0.00%	328	88.17%	372
Winn	527	59.48%	153	17.27%	206	23.25%	0	0.00%	321	36.23%	886
Totals	63,568	84.62%	8,958	11.92%	2,514	3.35%	82	0.11%	54,610	72.70%	75,122

== See also ==
- United States presidential elections in Louisiana
