= Baskin High School Building =

- Formerly listed on the U.S. National Register of Historic Places
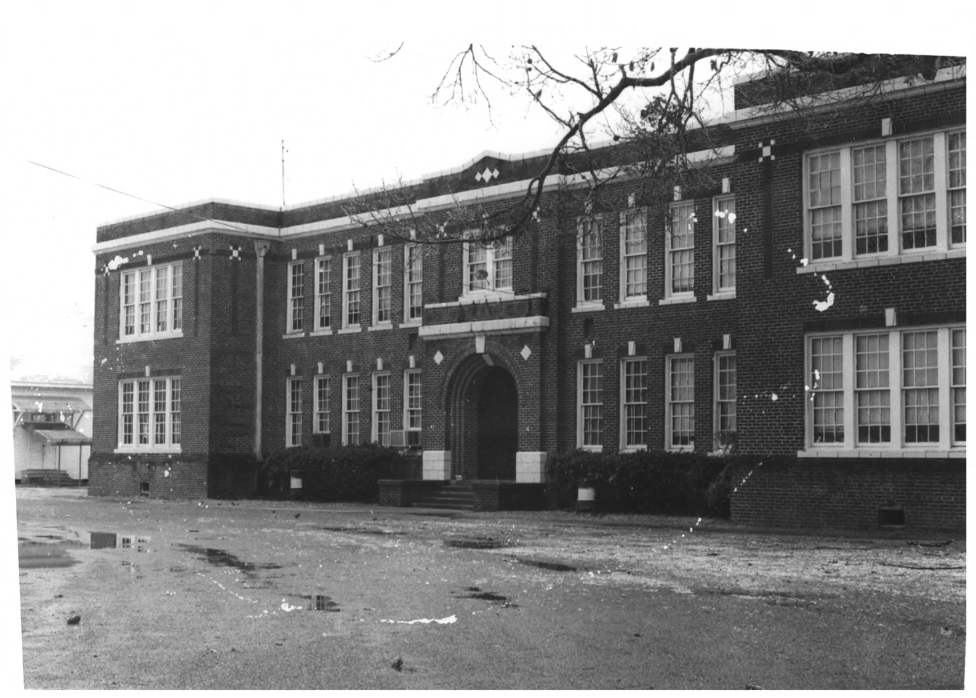

- Location within Louisiana Location within the United States
- Location: Along LA 857, Baskin, Louisiana
- Coordinates: 32°15′42″N 91°44′41″W
- Area: 1 acre (0.40 ha)
- Built: 1925
- NRHP reference No.: 81000295

Significant dates
- Added to NRHP: October 7, 1981
- Removed from NRHP: March 13, 2024

Baskin High School Building was a historic school building located along Louisiana Highway 857 in Baskin, Louisiana. When it was an active school, it was operated by the Franklin Parish School Board.

== History ==
Built in 1925–26, its facility was a two-story brick building with 11 bays along its front facade. It has a two-story auditorium extending to the rear.

It was deemed "significant in the area of architecture as Baskin's most pretentious and monumental structure." Since its construction it has been a community focal point.

The school moved into a different building in 1977. The 1926 building was listed on the National Register of Historic Places as "Baskin High School Building" on October 7, 1981.

The school district and the Louisiana Trust for Historical Preservation (LTHP) agreed in 2009 that if repairs were done to the school, then it would not be demolished. LTHP spent $31,000 in order to fix the building's roof.

The district moved to have the school demolished when the agreement expired on August 10, 2019. The school was razed in July 2021, and its listing was removed from the National Register in 2024.

== See also ==
- National Register of Historic Places listings in Franklin Parish, Louisiana
