= Grayson House (Fort Necessity, Louisiana) =

Historic house in Louisiana, United States

- U.S. National Register of Historic Places
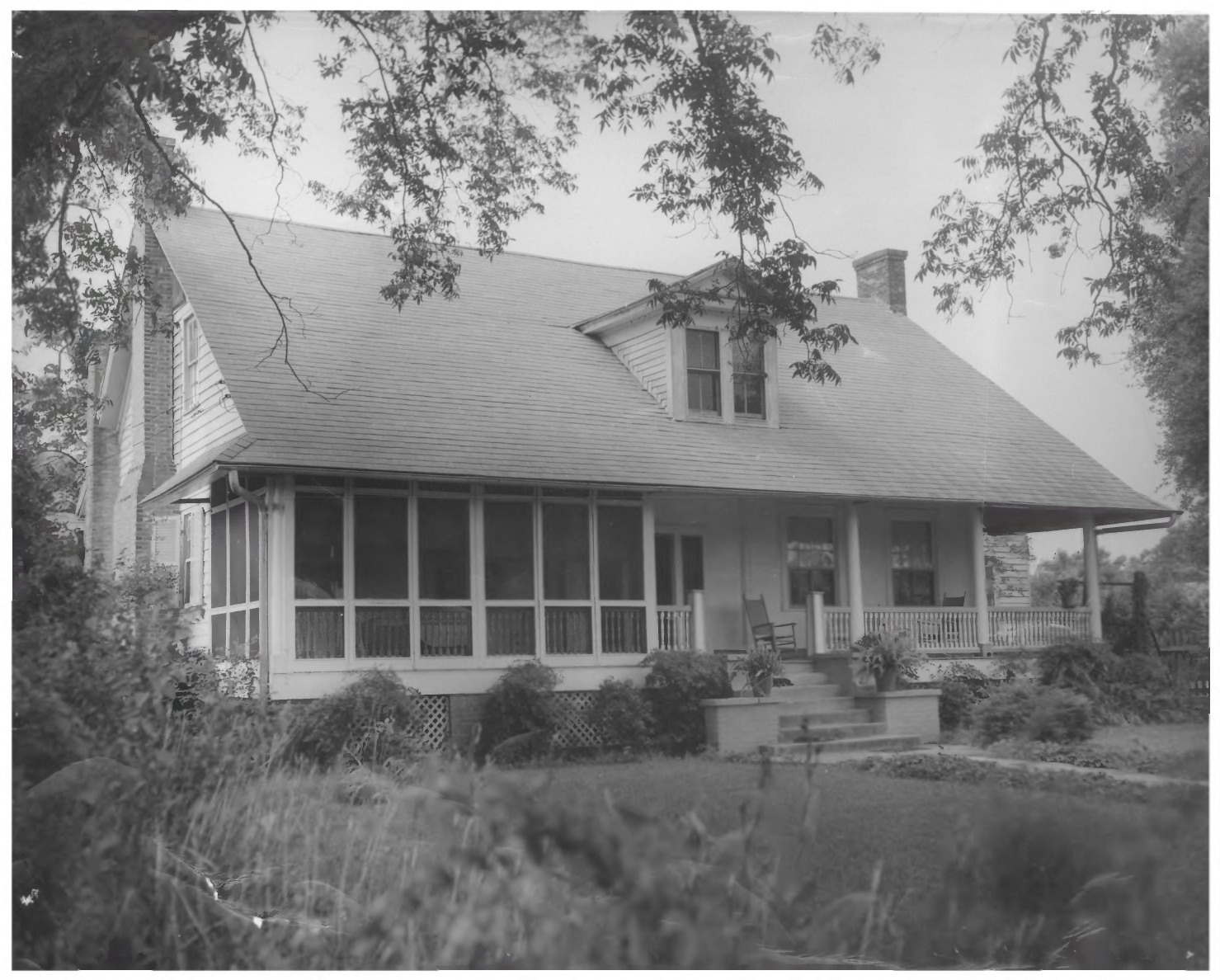

- Location within Louisiana Location within the United States
- Location: Along LA 562, about 4.8 miles (7.7 km) south of Fort Necessity, Louisiana
- Nearest city: Fort Necessity, Louisiana
- Coordinates: 31°58′40″N 91°48′19″W
- Area: 0.7 acres (0.28 ha)
- Built: c.1836
- Built by: Wiley B. Grayson
- Architectural style: Federal
- NRHP reference No.: 82000435
- Added to NRHP: October 27, 1982

The Grayson House was a historic plantation house located in Franklin Parish, Louisiana, about 4.8 miles (7.7 km) south of Fort Necessity.

Built in c.1836 in Federal style by Wiley B. Grayson, it was originally a galleried dogtrot structure two rooms deep with four chimneys set against the exteriors of side walls. The house went under a major renovation in 1910, with the open dogtrot passage being enclosed, an outbuilding being moved and connected to the west side of the house, a rear kitchen being built and the front and rear dormers being added.

The house was listed on the National Register of Historic Places on October 27, 1982. It has been destroyed some time after its enlistment.

== See also ==
- National Register of Historic Places listings in Franklin Parish, Louisiana
