= National Register of Historic Places listings in Franklin Parish, Louisiana =

Location of Franklin Parish in Louisiana

This is a list of the National Register of Historic Places listings in Franklin Parish, Louisiana.

This is intended to be a complete list of the properties on the National Register of Historic Places in Franklin Parish, Louisiana, United States. The locations of National Register properties for which the latitude and longitude coordinates are included below, may be seen in a map.

There are 4 properties listed on the National Register in the parish. Two properties were once listed, but have since been removed.

This National Park Service list is complete through NPS recent listings posted December 12, 2025.

== Current listings ==
	Name on the Register	Image	Date listed	Location	City or town	Description
1	Grayson House	Grayson House	October 27, 1982 (#82000435)	Along LA 562, about 4.8 miles (7.7 km) south of Fort Necessity; 31°58′40″N 91°48′19″W	Fort Necessity vicinity	The house was destroyed some time after its enlistment.
2	Jackson House	Jackson House	September 21, 1982 (#82002773)	703 Jackson Street; 32°09′59″N 91°42′50″W	Winnsboro	
3	Jackson Street Historic District	Jackson Street Historic District	October 5, 1982 (#82000436)	Jackson Street; 32°09′59″N 91°42′47″W	Winnsboro	
4	Winnsboro Commercial Historic District	Winnsboro Commercial Historic District	July 9, 1982 (#82002774)	Prairie Street; 32°09′52″N 91°43′07″W	Winnsboro	

== Former listings ==
	Name on the Register	Image	Date listed	Date removed	Location	City or town	Description
1	Baskin High School Building	Baskin High School Building	October 7, 1981 (#81000295)	March 13, 2024	Along Louisiana Highway 857; 32°15′42″N 91°44′41″W	Baskin	Building razed in July 2021
2	Chennault House	Chennault House	June 23, 1983 (#83000505)	November 29, 2016	Louisiana Highway 15 south of Gilbert; 32°02′35″N 91°39′25″W	Gilbert vicinity	Building burned in the early 1990s.

== See also ==
- List of National Historic Landmarks in Louisiana
- National Register of Historic Places listings in Louisiana
