= Graysontown Methodist Church =

Historic church in Virginia, United States

- U.S. National Register of Historic Places
- Virginia Landmarks Register
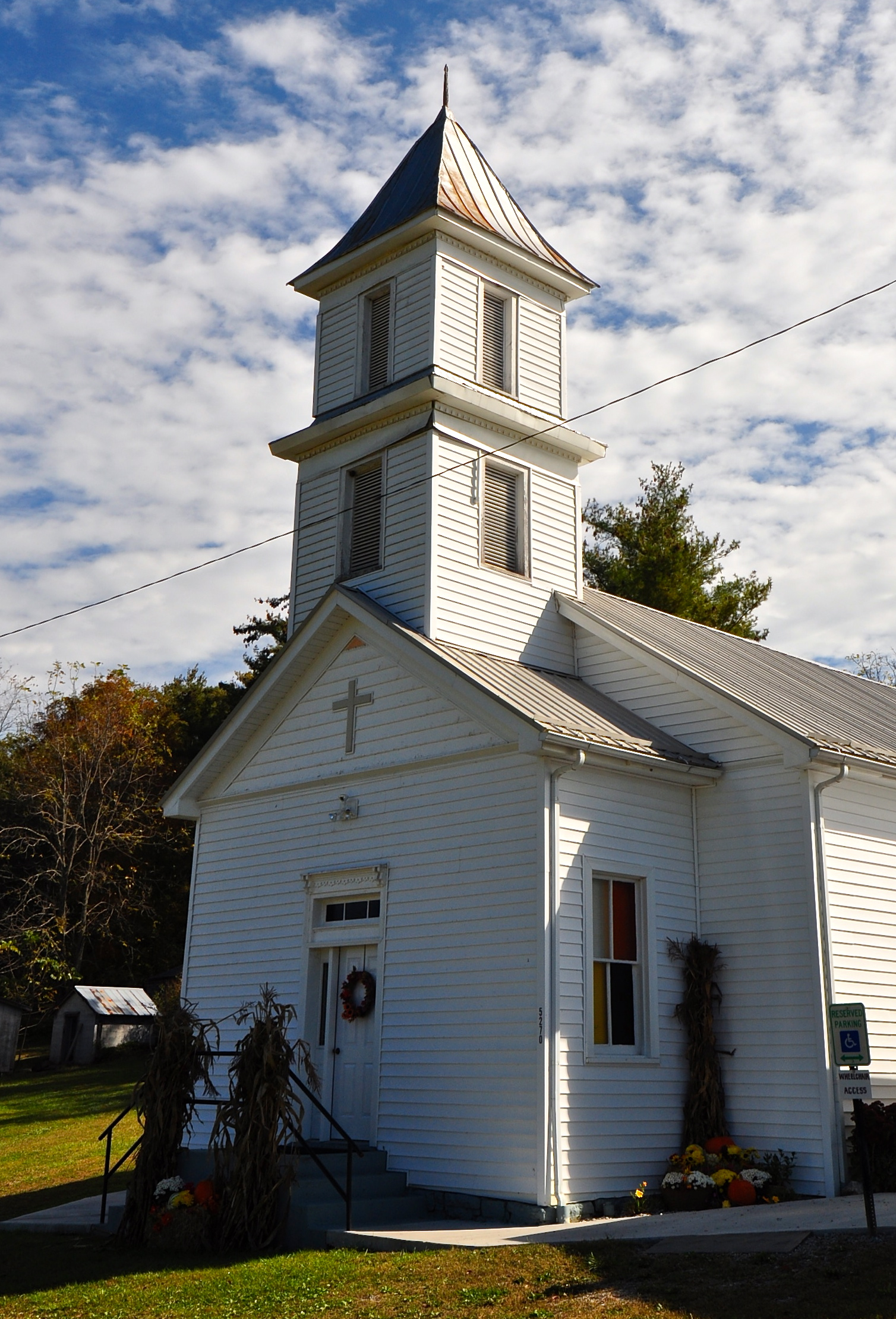
- Graysontown Methodist Church, October 2013

- Location within Virginia Location within the United States
- Location: VA 613, Graysontown, Virginia
- Coordinates: 37°2′13″N 80°33′40″W
- Area: less than one acre
- Built: 1895
- Architectural style: Nave plan
- MPS: Montgomery County MPS
- NRHP reference No.: 89001889
- VLR No.: 060-0109

Significant dates
- Added to NRHP: November 13, 1989
- Designated VLR: June 20, 1989

Graysontown Methodist Church is a historic Methodist church building located near Graysontown, Montgomery County, Virginia. It was built in 1895, and is a one-story, three-bay, nave plan frame structure clad in weatherboard. It has a two-stage central tower, with bracketed friezes and pyramidal roof.

It was listed on the National Register of Historic Places in 1989.
