= Graysontown, Virginia =

Unincorporated community in Virginia, United States

- Unincorporated community
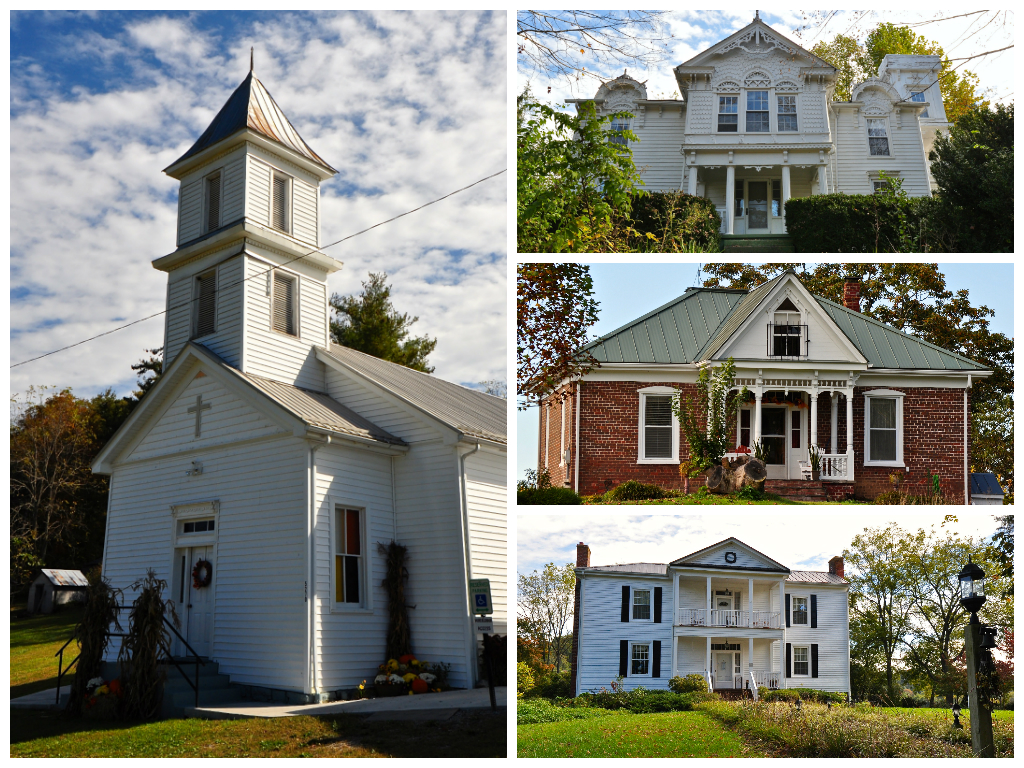
- National Register of Historic Places for Graysontown Virginia. Starting clockwise, Grayson-Gravely House, Bishop House, John Grayson House, and Graysontown Methodist Church.

- Location within Shenandoah Valley Location within Virginia Location within the United States
- Coordinates: 37°02′18″N 80°33′40″W
- Country: United States
- State: Virginia
- County: Montgomery
- Elevation: 1,854 ft (565 m)
- Time zone: UTC-5 (Eastern (EST))
  - Summer (DST): UTC-4 (EDT)
- Area code: 540
- GNIS feature ID: 1499492

Graysontown is an unincorporated community in Montgomery County, Virginia, United States. Graysontown is located on the Little River, 6.5 miles (10.5 km) south of Radford.

== History ==
Graysontown was named for John Grayson, a pioneer settler.

The Bishop House, John Grayson House, Grayson-Gravely House, and Graysontown Methodist Church are listed on the National Register of Historic Places in 1989.
