= Baskin, Louisiana =

- Village
- Village of Baskin
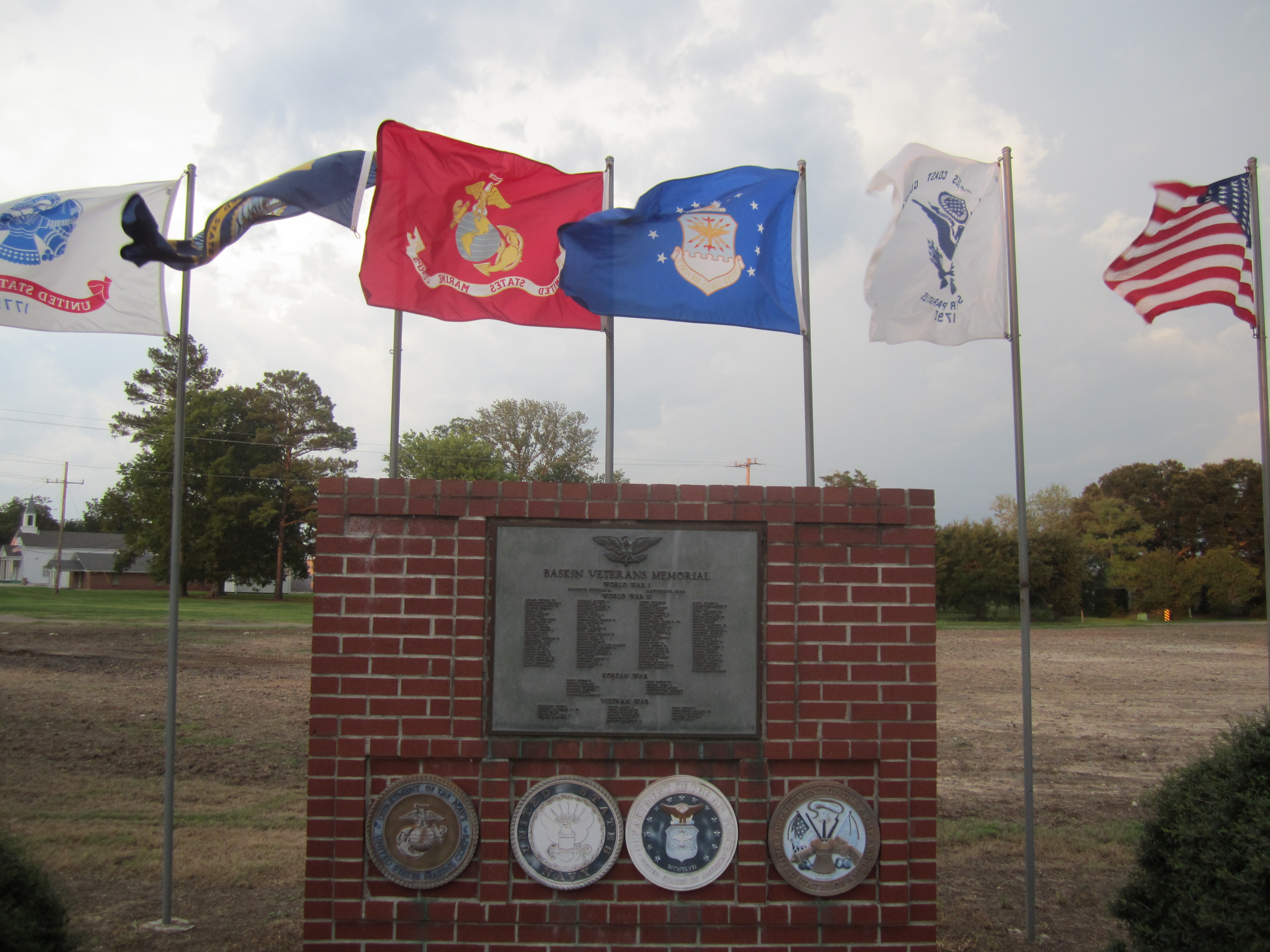
- Baskin Veterans Memorial

- Location of Baskin in Franklin Parish, Louisiana.

- Location of Louisiana in the United States
- Coordinates: 32°15′27″N 91°44′47″W
- Country: United States
- State: Louisiana
- Parish: Franklin

Area
  - Total: 1.33 sq mi (3.45 km^{2})
  - Land: 1.33 sq mi (3.45 km^{2})
  - Water: 0 sq mi (0.00 km^{2})
- Elevation: 72 ft (22 m)

Population (2020)
  - Total: 210
  - Density: 157.5/sq mi (60.83/km^{2})
- Time zone: UTC-6 (CST)
  - Summer (DST): UTC-5 (CDT)
- Area code: 318
- FIPS code: 22-04615
- GNIS feature ID: 2407415

Baskin is a village in Franklin Parish, Louisiana, United States. The population was 210 at the 2020 census, up from 188 in 2000. Baskin is located north of the parish seat of Winnsboro.

== History ==
Baskin was named in honor of Dr. Adolphus McDuffie Baskin, a pioneer settler.

== Geography ==
Baskin is located in northwestern Franklin Parish along U.S. Route 425, which leads south 7 miles (11 km) to Winnsboro and north 16 miles (26 km) to Rayville.

According to the United States Census Bureau, the village has a total area of 1.33 square miles (3.45 km^{2}), all land.

== Demographics ==
Historical population
Census	Pop.	Note	%±
1920	654		—
1930	416		−36.4%
1940	330		−20.7%
1950	117		−64.5%
1960	238		103.4%
1970	177		−25.6%
1980	286		61.6%
1990	243		−15.0%
2000	188		−22.6%
2010	254		35.1%
2020	210		−17.3%
2025 (est.)	205	▼	−2.4%
U.S. Decennial Census

As of the census of 2000, there were 188 people, 77 households, and 47 families residing in the village. The population density was 140.6 inhabitants per square mile (54.3/km^{2}). There were 86 housing units at an average density of 64.3 per square mile (24.8/km^{2}). The racial makeup of the village was 94.68% White, 2.66% African American, 0.53% Native American, and 2.13% from two or more races. Hispanic or Latino of any race were 0.53% of the population.

There were 77 households, out of which 32.5% had children under the age of 18 living with them, 48.1% were married couples living together, 9.1% had a female householder with no husband present, and 37.7% were non-families. 33.8% of all households were made up of individuals, and 26.0% had someone living alone who was 65 years of age or older. The average household size was 2.36 and the average family size was 3.04.

In the village, the population was spread out, with 26.6% under the age of 18, 5.9% from 18 to 24, 25.0% from 25 to 44, 21.3% from 45 to 64, and 21.3% who were 65 years of age or older. The median age was 42 years. For every 100 females, there were 77.4 males. For every 100 females age 18 and over, there were 72.5 males.

The median income for a household in the village was $18,000, and the median income for a family was $31,875. Males had a median income of $26,250 versus $12,321 for females. The per capita income for the village was $16,034. About 22.0% of families and 24.3% of the population were below the poverty line, including 22.2% of those under the age of eighteen and 31.7% of those 65 or over.

== Education ==
It is in the Franklin Parish School Board.

Baskin School, a K-8 school, is in the town. Franklin Parish High School in Winnsboro is the sole public high school of the parish. Residents of Baskin move on to Franklin Parish High.

Baskin School, initially an elementary and middle school began in the latter part of the 1800s, with Cumming's Gin and a facility on a private property housing initial classes. A building made of brick opened in 1916. 1920 was the year that the first class graduated. The 1926 Baskin High School Building opened, with senior high school becoming a part of the school. In 1977 it moved to a different facility. The high school division closed in 1997 and it became a PreKindergarten through 8th grade facility. The 1926 building, which had been listed on the National Register of Historic Places, was demolished in 2021.

== Sports ==
The Baskin High School women's basketball team holds the record for longest winning streak in organized sports. The Lady Rams won 218 consecutive games from 1948 to 1953—a span of six years. Once the streak was broken, another 71 game streak continued. In the span of ten years, the Lady Rams led by Hall of Fame coach, Edna "Tiny" Tarbutton, would go 315–2 with nine state titles and an average winning margin of more than 30 points. In 1993, Tarbutton was inducted into the Louisiana Sports Hall of Fame located in Natchitoches.

== Notable person ==
Lainey Wilson, a 2024 Grammy Award winning country music singer, was born in Baskin.
