= 1960 United States presidential election in Louisiana =

- November 8, 1960

Nominee	John F. Kennedy	Richard Nixon	Unpledged electors
Party	Democratic	Republican	States' Rights
Home state	Massachusetts	California
Running mate	Lyndon B. Johnson	Henry Cabot Lodge Jr.
Electoral vote	10	0	0
Popular vote	407,339	230,980	169,752
Percentage	50.42%	28.59%	20.99%
Parish results
Kennedy
30–40%
40–50%
50–60%
60–70%
70–80%
80–90%
Nixon
30–40%
40–50%
50–60%
Unpledged
30–40%
40–50%
50–60%
60–70%
President before election
Dwight D. Eisenhower
Republican
Elected President
John F. Kennedy
Democratic

The 1960 United States presidential election in Louisiana took place on November 8, 1960, as part of the 1960 United States presidential election. State voters chose ten representatives, or electors, to the Electoral College, who voted for president and vice president.

Louisiana was won by Senator John F. Kennedy (D–Massachusetts), running with Texas Senator Lyndon B. Johnson, with 50.42% of the popular vote against incumbent Vice President Richard Nixon (R–California), running with United States Ambassador to the United Nations Henry Cabot Lodge Jr., with 28.59% of the popular vote. There was also a failed effort in Louisiana to influence electors to vote for Nixon instead of Kennedy.

Louisiana has a higher Roman Catholic population than the rest of Southern United States, which benefitted Kennedy, the second Roman Catholic to head a major party ticket. This Catholic base was concentrated in the southern half of the state, especially Acadiana. Nixon and a slate of unpledged electors aligned with the National States' Rights Party split the northern Protestant parishes, with Nixon winning the less fertile poor white parishes and the unpledged slate the northern Black Belt.

As of the 2024 presidential election, this is the last election in which Jefferson and St. Tammany Parishes in the New Orleans suburbs have voted for a Democratic presidential candidate.

== Results ==
1960 United States presidential election in Louisiana
Party	Candidate	Votes	%
Democratic	John F. Kennedy	407,339	50.42%
Republican	Richard Nixon	230,980	28.59%
States' Rights	Unpledged electors	169,572	20.99%
Total votes		807,891	100%

=== Results by parish ===
Parish	John F. Kennedy Democratic		Richard Nixon Republican		Unpledged electors States’ Rights		Margin		Total votes cast
Parish	#	%	#	%	#	%	#	%	Total votes cast
Acadia	11,440	75.84%	2,616	17.34%	1,028	6.82%	8,824	58.50%	15,084
Allen	3,719	59.84%	1,676	26.97%	820	13.19%	2,043	32.87%	6,215
Ascension	5,689	74.76%	1,012	13.30%	909	11.94%	4,677	61.46%	7,610
Assumption	3,019	71.69%	766	18.19%	426	10.12%	2,253	53.50%	4,211
Avoyelles	7,625	75.98%	1,270	12.66%	1,140	11.36%	6,355	63.32%	10,035
Beauregard	2,903	48.67%	2,432	40.77%	630	10.56%	471	7.90%	5,965
Bienville	625	17.62%	1,230	34.67%	1,693	47.72%	-463 (Note: In this parish where Kennedy ran third behind both Nixon and the unpledged slate, margin given is Nixon vote minus unpledged vote and percentage margin Nixon percentage minus unpledged percentage.)	-13.05%	3,548
Bossier	2,198	25.21%	3,429	39.32%	3,093	35.47%	336	3.85%	8,720
Caddo	11,481	24.80%	25,139	54.29%	9,681	20.91%	-13,658	-29.49%	46,301
Calcasieu	24,233	64.40%	10,243	27.22%	3,151	8.37%	13,990	37.18%	37,627
Caldwell	694	34.00%	716	35.08%	631	30.92%	-22	-1.08%	2,041
Cameron	1,944	83.08%	322	13.76%	74	3.16%	1,622	69.32%	2,340
Catahoula	558	26.17%	971	45.54%	603	28.28%	368	17.26%	2,132
Claiborne	489	12.69%	1,336	34.67%	2,029	52.65%	-693	-17.98%	3,854
Concordia	768	23.06%	1,009	30.29%	1,554	46.65%	-545	-16.36%	3,331
DeSoto	1,183	26.65%	1,603	36.11%	1,653	37.24%	-50	-1.13%	4,439
East Baton Rouge	26,326	46.65%	17,749	31.45%	12,360	21.90%	8,577	15.20%	56,435
East Carroll	364	23.88%	448	29.40%	712	46.72%	-264	-17.32%	1,524
East Feliciana	475	24.65%	313	16.24%	1,139	59.11%	-664 (Note: In this parish where Nixon ran third behind both Kennedy and the unpledged slate, margin given is Kennedy vote minus unpledged vote and percentage margin Kennedy percentage minus unpledged percentage.)	-34.46%	1,927
Evangeline	7,865	80.55%	1,105	11.32%	794	8.13%	6,760	69.23%	9,764
Franklin	1,213	30.03%	1,336	33.08%	1,490	36.89%	-154	-3.81%	4,039
Grant	1,219	31.40%	1,254	32.30%	1,409	36.30%	-155	-4.00%	3,882
Iberia	9,235	59.70%	3,551	22.95%	2,684	17.35%	5,684	36.75%	15,470
Iberville	4,558	72.25%	1,000	15.85%	751	11.90%	3,558	56.40%	6,309
Jackson	1,398	34.10%	1,799	43.88%	903	22.02%	-401	-9.78%	4,100
Jefferson	32,119	51.28%	17,215	27.48%	13,304	21.24%	14,904	23.80%	62,638
Jefferson Davis	5,904	67.77%	2,251	25.84%	557	6.39%	3,653	41.93%	8,712
Lafayette	14,132	62.30%	6,047	26.66%	2,505	11.04%	8,085	35.64%	22,684
Lafourche	12,244	76.26%	2,930	18.25%	881	5.49%	9,314	58.01%	16,055
LaSalle	843	21.94%	2,123	55.26%	876	22.80%	1,247	32.46%	3,842
Lincoln	1,051	20.57%	2,766	54.14%	1,292	25.29%	1,474	28.85%	5,109
Livingston	2,881	43.47%	954	14.39%	2,793	42.14%	88	1.33%	6,628
Madison	235	12.45%	629	33.32%	1,024	54.24%	-395	-20.92%	1,888
Morehouse	1,085	22.70%	2,551	53.37%	1,144	23.93%	1,407	29.44%	4,780
Natchitoches	2,781	39.39%	2,562	36.29%	1,717	24.32%	219	3.10%	7,060
Orleans	87,242	49.64%	47,111	26.80%	41,414	23.56%	40,131	22.84%	175,767
Ouachita	5,202	26.97%	10,525	54.56%	3,564	18.47%	-5,323	-27.59%	19,291
Plaquemines	1,087	21.12%	712	13.84%	3,347	65.04%	-2,260	-43.92%	5,146
Pointe Coupee	2,953	71.81%	674	16.39%	485	11.79%	2,279	55.42%	4,112
Rapides	9,651	40.58%	8,155	34.29%	5,976	25.13%	1,496	6.29%	23,782
Red River	377	19.67%	406	21.18%	1,134	59.15%	-728	-37.97%	1,917
Richland	996	25.74%	1,378	35.62%	1,495	38.64%	-117	-3.02%	3,869
Sabine	2,412	40.96%	2,419	41.08%	1,058	17.97%	-7	-0.12%	5,889
St. Bernard	4,660	42.56%	1,431	13.07%	4,858	44.37%	-198	-1.81%	10,949
St. Charles	4,708	71.31%	1,377	20.86%	517	7.83%	3,331	50.45%	6,602
St. Helena	678	37.48%	296	16.36%	835	46.16%	-157	-8.68%	1,809
St. James	4,362	82.09%	620	11.67%	332	6.25%	3,742	70.42%	5,314
St. John the Baptist	3,782	80.13%	488	10.34%	450	9.53%	3,294	69.79%	4,720
St. Landry	14,625	72.18%	3,083	15.22%	2,554	12.60%	11,542	56.96%	20,262
St. Martin	5,506	77.96%	858	12.15%	699	9.90%	4,648	65.81%	7,063
St. Mary	6,671	61.59%	2,992	27.62%	1,169	10.79%	3,679	33.97%	10,832
St. Tammany	5,179	46.81%	2,850	25.76%	3,034	27.42%	2,145	19.39%	11,063
Tangipahoa	6,648	46.32%	3,285	22.89%	4,418	30.79%	2,230	15.53%	14,351
Tensas	247	20.45%	510	42.22%	451	37.33%	59	4.89%	1,208
Terrebonne	8,992	68.07%	3,126	23.66%	1,092	8.27%	5,866	44.41%	13,210
Union	1,034	25.45%	2,017	49.64%	1,012	24.91%	-983	-24.19%	4,063
Vermilion	11,257	77.13%	2,170	14.87%	1,168	8.00%	9,087	62.26%	14,595
Vernon	3,145	51.06%	1,991	32.32%	1,024	16.62%	1,154	18.74%	6,160
Washington	5,678	49.81%	1,847	16.20%	3,875	33.99%	1,803	15.82%	11,400
Webster	1,273	16.60%	3,139	40.94%	3,255	42.45%	-116	-1.51%	7,667
West Baton Rouge	2,315	73.70%	390	12.42%	436	13.88%	1,879	59.82%	3,141
West Carroll	784	32.36%	742	30.62%	897	37.02%	-113	-4.66%	2,423
West Feliciana	271	30.42%	196	22.00%	424	47.59%	-153	-17.17%	891
Winn	1,108	27.05%	1,839	44.90%	1,149	28.05%	690	16.85%	4,096
Totals	407,339	50.42%	230,980	28.59%	169,572	20.99%	176,359	21.83%	807,891

==== Parishes that flipped from Republican to Democratic ====
- Allen
- Beauregard
- Assumption
- Calcasieu
- East Baton Rouge
- Iberia
- Jefferson Davis
- Jefferson
- Lafourche
- Lafayette
- Natchitoches
- Orleans
- Rapides
- Saint Charles
- St. James
- St. John the Baptist
- St. Landry
- St. Martin
- St. Mary
- St. Tammany
- Tangipahoa
- Terrebonne
- Vernon

==== Parishes that flipped from Republican to Unpledged ====
- Bienville
- Claiborne
- Concordia
- DeSoto
- Grant
- Plaquemines
- Saint Bernard
- West Feliciana
- Webster

==== Parishes that flipped from Unpledged to Republican ====
- Caldwell

==== Parishes that flipped from Democratic to Unpledged ====
- East Carroll
- East Feliciana
- Franklin
- Red River
- St. Helena

== See also ==
- United States presidential elections in Louisiana
