= Grayson–Gravely House =

Historic house in Virginia, United States

- U.S. National Register of Historic Places
- Virginia Landmarks Register
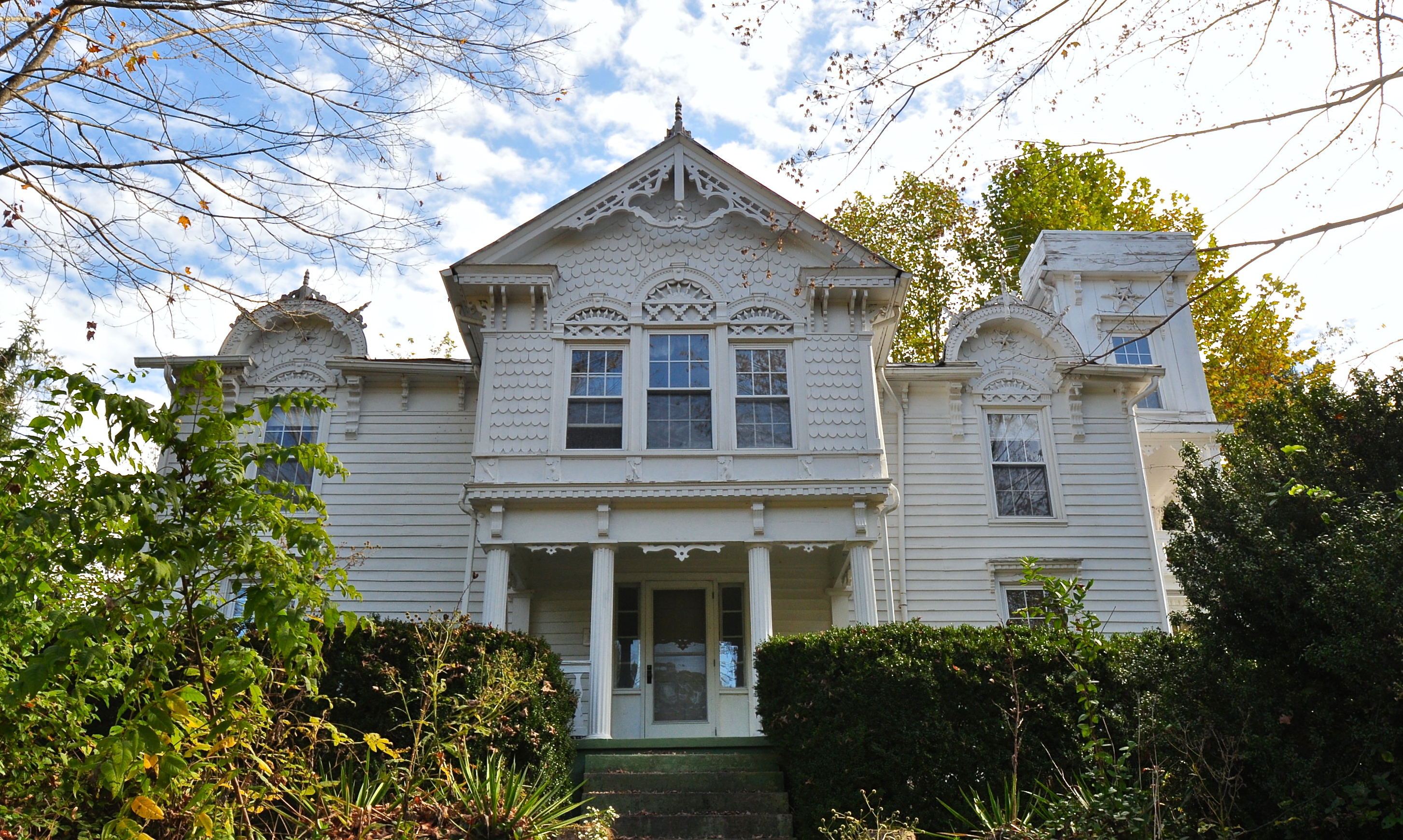
- Grayson–Gravely House, October 2013

- Location within Virginia Location within the United States
- Location: VA 613 at Little River Bridge, near Graysontown, Virginia
- Coordinates: 37°2′36″N 80°33′46″W
- Area: less than one acre
- Built: 1891
- Architectural style: Late Victorian
- MPS: Montgomery County MPS
- NRHP reference No.: 89001813
- VLR No.: 060-0117

Significant dates
- Added to NRHP: November 13, 1989
- Designated VLR: June 20, 1989

Grayson–Gravely House is a historic home located near Graysontown, Montgomery County, Virginia. The house was built in 1891, and is a two-story, three-bay, frame Victorian dwelling with a central passage plan. It has a standing seam metal gable roof. It has a three-bay porch supported by Doric order columns and a three-stage tower with rooms on the first and third floors and a porch on the second, The porches feature a number of decorative elements including elaborate sawn balusters, a frieze with brackets, dentils, and tablets.

It was listed on the National Register of Historic Places in 1989.
