= John Grayson House =

Historic house in Virginia, United States

- U.S. National Register of Historic Places
- Virginia Landmarks Register
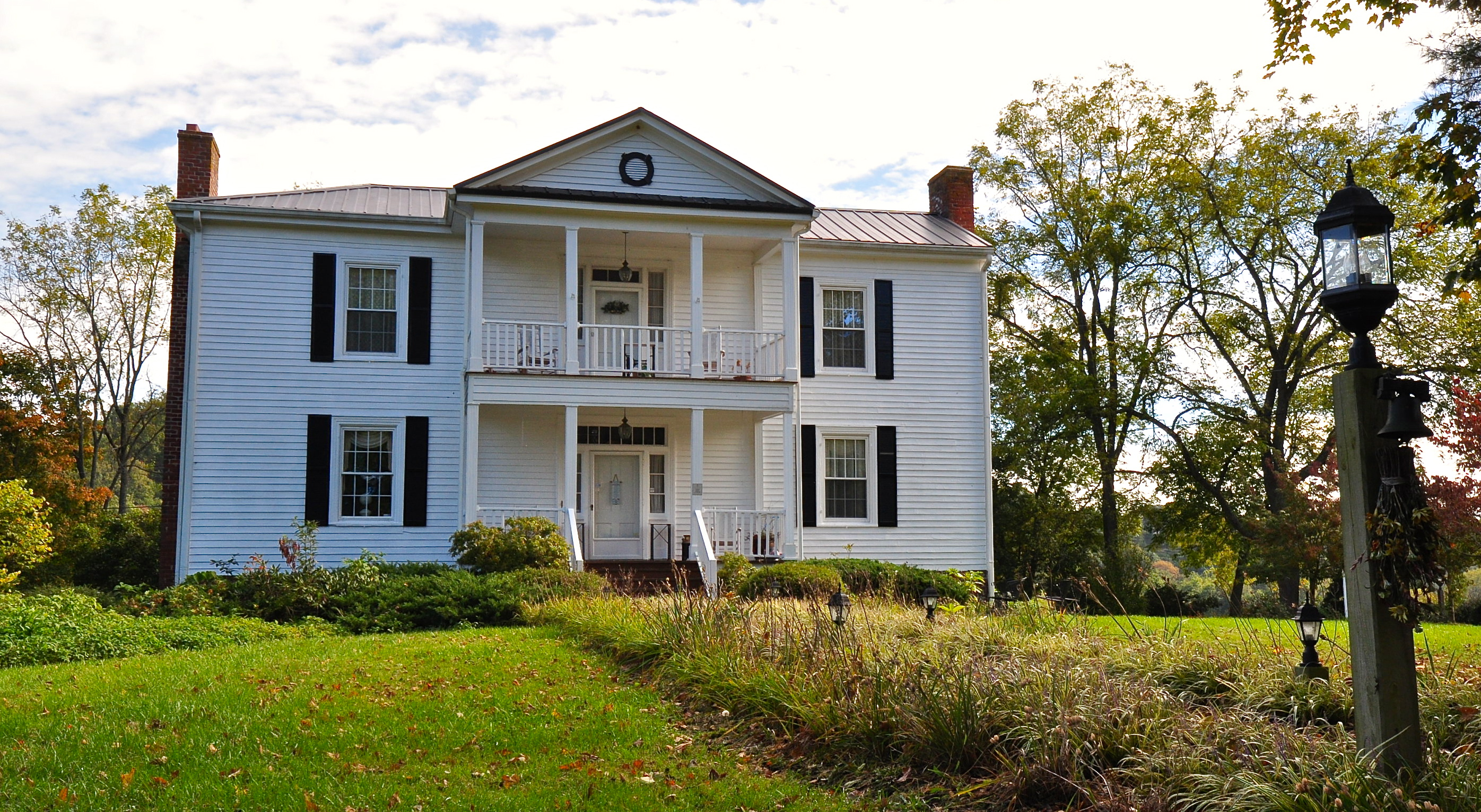
- John Grayson House, October 2013

- Location within Virginia Location within the United States
- Location: 0.5 miles (0.80 km) northeast of VA 613 bridge over Little River, near Graysontown, Virginia
- Coordinates: 37°2′52″N 80°33′28″W
- Area: less than one acre
- Built: c. 1850
- Architectural style: Single-pile center-passage
- MPS: Montgomery County MPS
- NRHP reference No.: 89001896
- VLR No.: 060-0118

Significant dates
- Added to NRHP: November 13, 1989
- Designated VLR: June 20, 1989

John Grayson House is a historic home located near Graysontown, Montgomery County, Virginia. The house was built about 1850, and is a two-story, three-bay, frame dwelling with a single pile central passage plan. It has a two-story ell and a standing seam metal roof. Its front facade features a two-story pedimented porch containing a circular louvered vent in the gable. Also on the property is a tall frame smokehouse with a stone foundation and a pyramidal standing-seam metal roof.

It was listed on the National Register of Historic Places in 1989.
