= Franklin Parish, Louisiana =

Parish in Louisiana, United States

Franklin Parish
- Parish
- Parish of Franklin; Paroisse de Franklin (French); Parroquia de Franklin (Spanish)
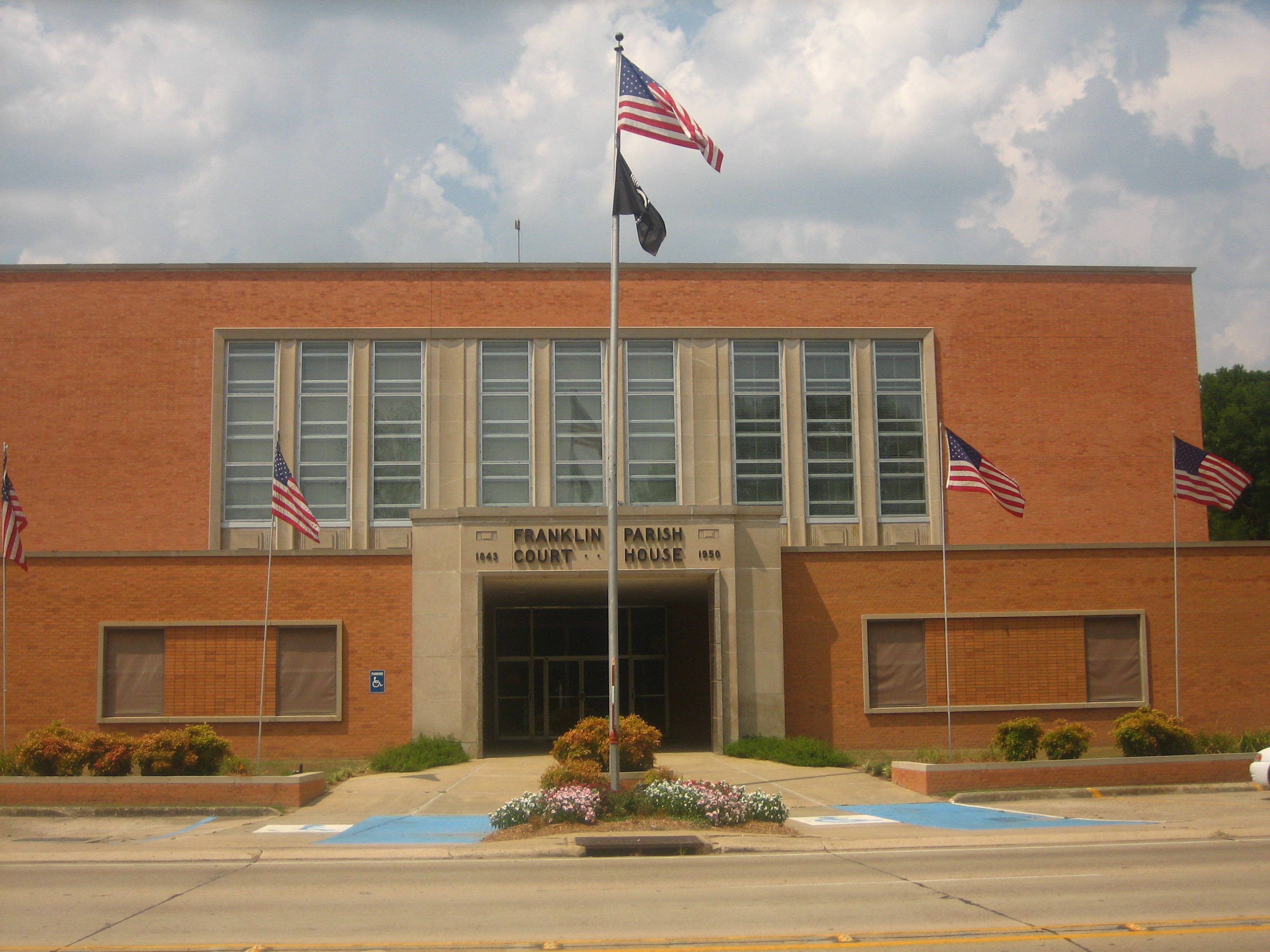
- Franklin Parish Courthouse in Winnsboro

- Location within the U.S. state of Louisiana
- Coordinates: 32°08′N 91°40′W
- Country: United States
- State: Louisiana
- Founded: 1843
- Named for: Benjamin Franklin
- Seat: Winnsboro
- Largest city: Winnsboro

Area
  - Total: 635 sq mi (1,640 km^{2})
  - Land: 625 sq mi (1,620 km^{2})
  - Water: 11 sq mi (28 km^{2}) 1.7%

Population (2020)
  - Total: 19,774
  - Estimate (2025): 19,002 ▼
  - Density: 31/sq mi (12/km^{2})
- Time zone: UTC−6 (Central)
  - Summer (DST): UTC−5 (CDT)
- Congressional district: 5th

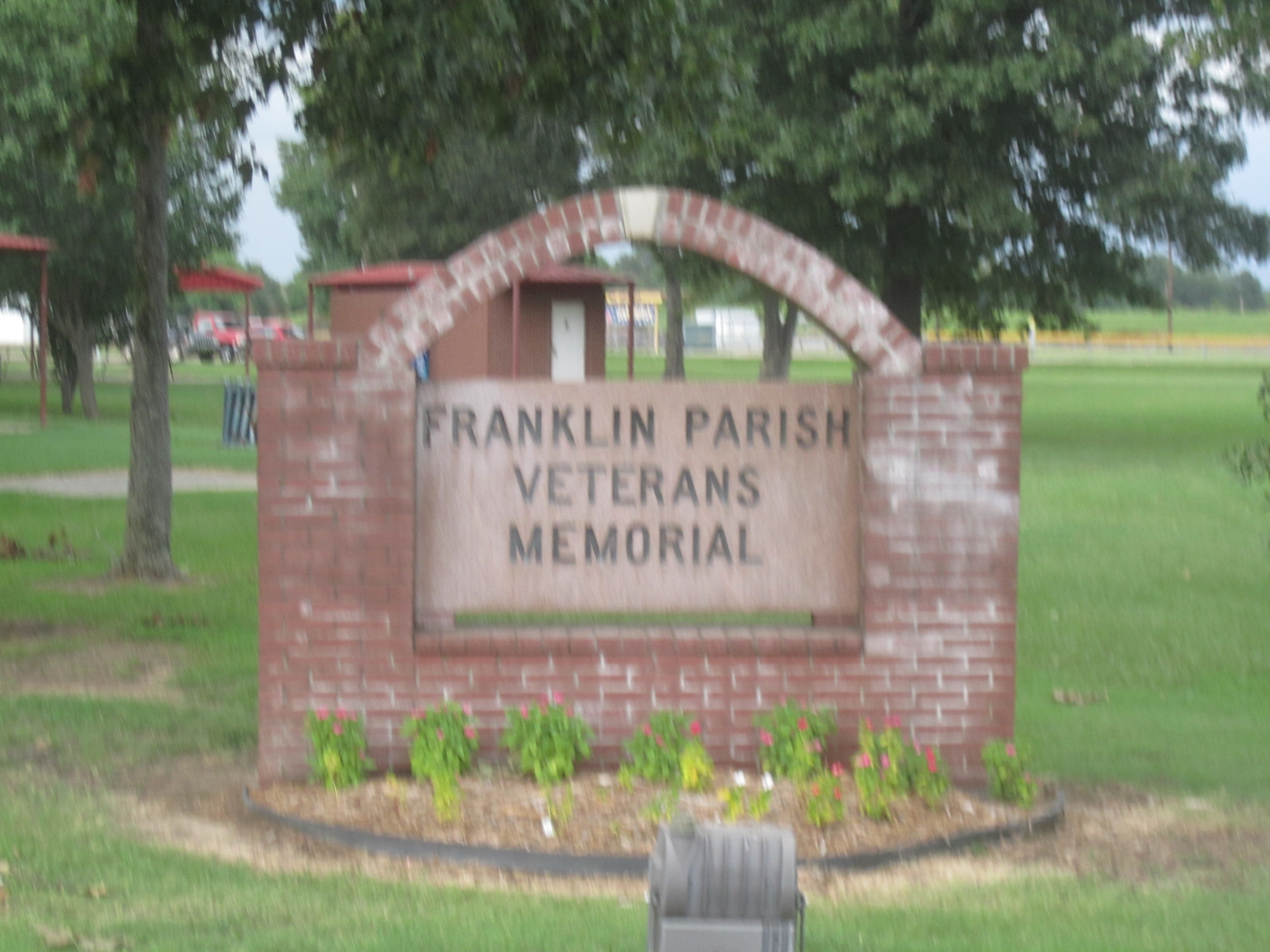
Franklin Parish Veterans Memorial sign in Winnsboro, Louisiana

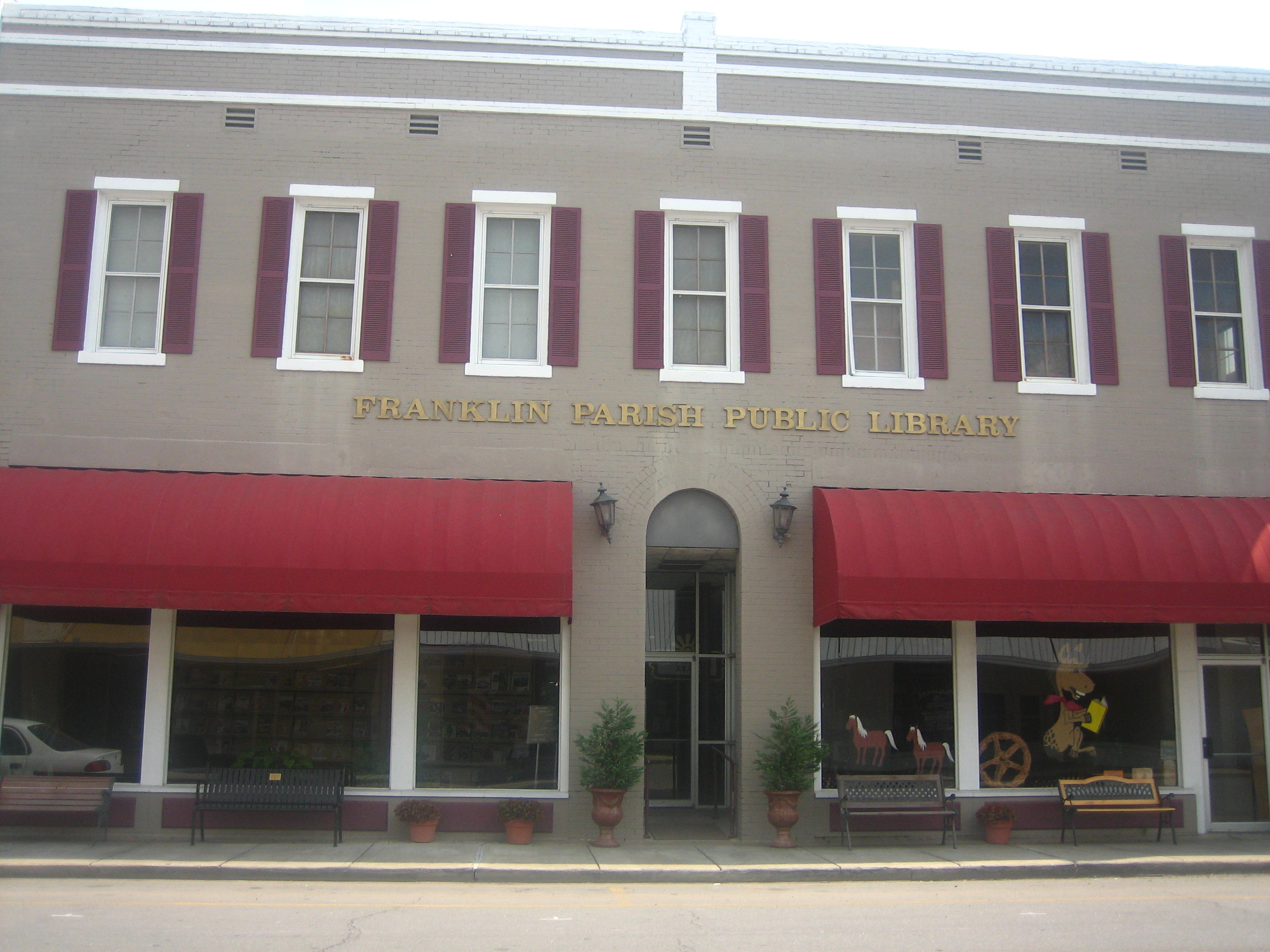
Franklin Parish Library in downtown Winnsboro historic district

Franklin Parish (French: Paroisse de Franklin, Spanish: Parroquia de Franklin) is a parish located in the northeastern part of the U.S. state of Louisiana. As of the 2020, its population was 19,774. The parish seat and the most populous municipality is Winnsboro. The parish was founded in 1843 and named for Benjamin Franklin.

== Geography ==
According to the U.S. Census Bureau, the parish has a total area of 635 square miles (1,640 km^{2}), of which 625 square miles (1,620 km^{2}) is land and 11 square miles (28 km^{2}) (1.7%) is water.

=== Major highways ===
- U.S. Highway 425 / Louisiana Highway 15
- Louisiana Highway 4
- Louisiana Highway 17
- Louisiana Highway 128
- Louisiana Highway 130
- Louisiana Highway 132
- Louisiana Highway 135
- Louisiana Highway 555
- Louisiana Highway 562
- Louisiana Highway 572
- Louisiana Highway 577
- Louisiana Highway 578
- Louisiana Highway 610
- Louisiana Highway 618
- Louisiana Highway 857
- Louisiana Highway 858
- Louisiana Highway 859
- Louisiana Highway 860
- Louisiana Highway 861
- Louisiana Highway 862
- Louisiana Highway 863
- Louisiana Highway 864
- Louisiana Highway 865
- Louisiana Highway 866
- Louisiana Highway 867
- Louisiana Highway 868
- Louisiana Highway 869
- Louisiana Highway 870
- Louisiana Highway 871
- Louisiana Highway 873
- Louisiana Highway 874
- Louisiana Highway 875
- Louisiana Highway 876
- Louisiana Highway 1242
- Louisiana Highway 3201
- Louisiana Highway 3210

=== Adjacent parishes ===
- Richland Parish (north)
- Madison Parish (northeast)
- Tensas Parish (southeast)
- Catahoula Parish (south)
- Caldwell Parish (west)

=== National protected area ===
- Tensas River National Wildlife Refuge (part)

== Communities ==
=== Towns ===
- Winnsboro (parish seat and largest municipality)
- Wisner

=== Villages ===
- Baskin
- Gilbert

=== Unincorporated communities ===
- Chase
- Crowville
- Extension
- Fort Necessity
- Jigger
- Liddieville

== Demographics ==
Historical population
Census	Pop.	Note	%±
1850	3,251		—
1860	6,162		89.5%
1870	5,078		−17.6%
1880	6,495		27.9%
1890	6,900		6.2%
1900	8,890		28.8%
1910	11,989		34.9%
1920	24,100		101.0%
1930	30,530		26.7%
1940	32,382		6.1%
1950	29,376		−9.3%
1960	26,088		−11.2%
1970	23,946		−8.2%
1980	24,141		0.8%
1990	22,387		−7.3%
2000	21,263		−5.0%
2010	20,767		−2.3%
2020	19,774		−4.8%
2025 (est.)	19,002	▼	−3.9%
U.S. Decennial Census; 1790-1960 1900-1990; 1990-2000 2010-2013

=== 2020 census ===
As of the 2020 census, the parish had a population of 19,774 and a median age of 40.4 years. 24.0% of residents were under the age of 18 and 19.2% were 65 years of age or older. For every 100 females there were 97.8 males, and for every 100 females age 18 and over there were 95.3 males age 18 and over.

As of the 2020 census, there were 7,727 households and 5,130 families residing in the parish. Of those households, 32.0% had children under the age of 18 living in them, 41.0% were married-couple households, 19.7% were households with a male householder and no spouse or partner present, and 33.8% were households with a female householder and no spouse or partner present. About 31.2% of all households were made up of individuals and 15.1% had someone living alone who was 65 years of age or older.

As of the 2020 census, there were 8,883 housing units, of which 13.0% were vacant. Among occupied units, 71.3% were owner-occupied and 28.7% were renter-occupied; the homeowner vacancy rate was 1.6% and the rental vacancy rate was 5.9%.

The racial makeup of the parish was 63.2% White, 33.1% Black or African American, 0.2% American Indian and Alaska Native, 0.2% Asian, <0.1% Native Hawaiian and Pacific Islander, 0.4% from some other race, and 2.9% from two or more races. Hispanic or Latino residents of any race comprised 1.4% of the population.

As of the 2020 census, 26.0% of residents lived in urban areas while 74.0% lived in rural areas.

=== Racial and ethnic composition ===
Franklin Parish, Louisiana – Racial and ethnic composition Note: the US Census treats Hispanic/Latino as an ethnic category. This table excludes Latinos from the racial categories and assigns them to a separate category. Hispanics/Latinos may be of any race.
Race / Ethnicity (NH = Non-Hispanic)	Pop 1980	Pop 1990	Pop 2000	Pop 2010	Pop 2020	% 1980	% 1990	% 2000	% 2010	% 2020
White alone (NH)	16,293	15,197	14,197	13,853	12,430	67.49%	67.88%	66.77%	66.71%	62.86%
Black or African American alone (NH)	7,645	7,015	6,692	6,500	6,508	31.67%	31.34%	31.47%	31.30%	32.91%
Native American or Alaska Native alone (NH)	6	31	55	36	26	0.02%	0.14%	0.26%	0.17%	0.13%
Asian alone (NH)	31	24	39	42	38	0.13%	0.11%	0.18%	0.20%	0.19%
Native Hawaiian or Pacific Islander alone (NH)	x	x	1	6	0	x	x	0.00%	0.03%	0.00%
Other race alone (NH)	8	0	1	5	17	0.03%	0.00%	0.00%	0.02%	0.09%
Mixed race or Multiracial (NH)	x	x	118	129	479	x	x	0.55%	0.62%	2.42%
Hispanic or Latino (any race)	158	120	160	196	276	0.65%	0.54%	0.75%	0.94%	1.40%
Total	24,141	22,387	21,263	20,767	19,774	100.00%	100.00%	100.00%	100.00%	100.00%

== Education ==
Franklin Parish School Board operates local public schools. Franklin Parish High School is the sole public high school in the parish.

The parish also hosts two private schools. One of them, Franklin Academy in Winnsboro, was opened as a segregation academy on September 14, 1970, three weeks after parish schools were ordered by a federal judge to desegregate. Franklin Academy's student body is 97% white, while Franklin Parish High School's is majority Black.

== Culture ==
Franklin Parish hosts the annual Franklin Parish Catfish Festival with music, attractions and hundreds of vendors. The 2018 festival was attended by over 10,000 people in bad weather but usually the draw is between 15,000 and 20,000. People from across the region are attracted by the relatively high vendor count and this has an important economic contribution for local businesses. In past years the festival has included an antique car show, a zoo exhibit for children and an exhibit about Louisiana's contributions during World War II, along with performances from Grammy-winning artists Jo-El Sonnier and Jason Crabb.

== Notable people ==
- Ralph E. King, Winnsboro physician who represented Catahoula, Franklin, and Richland parishes in the Louisiana State Senate from 1944 to 1952 and again from 1956 to 1960
- Anthony "Booger" McFarland, Winnsboro native; All-American football player at Louisiana State University; played in National Football League for Tampa Bay Buccaneers
- Lainey Wilson, a 2024 Grammy Award winning country music singer, was born in Baskin.

== Politics ==
United States presidential election results for Franklin Parish, Louisiana
Year	Republican		Democratic		Third party(ies)	
Year	No.	%	No.	%	No.	%
1912	8	1.37%	449	76.88%	127	21.75%
1916	10	1.44%	684	98.56%	0	0.00%
1920	173	16.15%	898	83.85%	0	0.00%
1924	143	17.23%	687	82.77%	0	0.00%
1928	492	30.13%	1,141	69.87%	0	0.00%
1932	78	2.59%	2,930	97.34%	2	0.07%
1936	231	7.25%	2,948	92.50%	8	0.25%
1940	292	8.46%	3,159	91.54%	0	0.00%
1944	597	19.43%	2,476	80.57%	0	0.00%
1948	149	3.84%	1,857	47.80%	1,879	48.37%
1952	1,614	36.29%	2,833	63.71%	0	0.00%
1956	1,130	32.69%	1,352	39.11%	975	28.20%
1960	1,336	33.08%	1,213	30.03%	1,490	36.89%
1964	5,470	87.82%	759	12.18%	0	0.00%
1968	1,052	14.76%	681	9.56%	5,394	75.68%
1972	4,967	73.76%	1,272	18.89%	495	7.35%
1976	3,947	49.39%	3,824	47.85%	220	2.75%
1980	5,301	54.38%	4,177	42.85%	270	2.77%
1984	6,708	67.80%	2,937	29.68%	249	2.52%
1988	5,520	62.19%	3,043	34.28%	313	3.53%
1992	3,889	40.29%	4,127	42.75%	1,637	16.96%
1996	3,961	44.01%	4,076	45.29%	963	10.70%
2000	5,363	64.18%	2,792	33.41%	201	2.41%
2004	6,141	67.46%	2,828	31.07%	134	1.47%
2008	6,278	67.09%	2,961	31.64%	119	1.27%
2012	6,294	67.42%	2,921	31.29%	121	1.30%
2016	6,514	71.10%	2,506	27.35%	142	1.55%
2020	6,970	71.71%	2,658	27.35%	92	0.95%
2024	6,524	74.15%	2,196	24.96%	78	0.89%

== See also ==
- National Register of Historic Places listings in Franklin Parish, Louisiana
