= National Register of Historic Places listings in Richland Parish, Louisiana =

Location of Richland Parish in Louisiana

This is a list of the National Register of Historic Places listings in Richland Parish, Louisiana.

This is intended to be a complete list of the properties on the National Register of Historic Places in Richland Parish, Louisiana, United States. The locations of National Register properties for which the latitude and longitude coordinates are included below, may be seen in a map.

There are 10 properties listed on the National Register in the parish. One property was once listed, but has since been removed.

This National Park Service list is complete through NPS recent listings posted May 22, 2026.

== Current listings ==
	Name on the Register	Image	Date listed	Location	City or town	Description
1	Delhi Municipal Baseball Park	Delhi Municipal Baseball Park	January 28, 2000 (#00000007)	Chicago and Louisiana Sts. 32°27′19″N 91°29′48″W	Delhi	
2	Downtown Delhi Historic District	Downtown Delhi Historic District	March 14, 1997 (#97000234)	606-708 1st St. and 115-201 Broadway; 32°27′26″N 91°29′36″W	Delhi	
3	Marsden Mounds		August 4, 2004 (#04000803)	32°29′11″N 91°29′30″W	Delhi vicinity	A multimound archaeological site near Delhi, Louisiana, with a Poverty Point period component (1500 BCE) and a Coles Creek component (400 to 1200 CE).
4	Miles-Hanna House	Miles-Hanna House	October 18, 1996 (#96001161)	206 Charter; 32°27′31″N 91°29′36″W	Delhi	
5	Poplar Chapel AME Church		June 2, 1989 (#89000475)	Louisiana Highway 135; 32°23′55″N 91°50′02″W	Rayville vicinity	
6	Rayville High School	Rayville High School	October 29, 1992 (#92001491)	109 Madeline St. 32°28′33″N 91°45′25″W	Rayville	
7	Nonnie Roark Rhymes Memorial Library	Nonnie Roark Rhymes Memorial Library	November 2, 1990 (#90001736)	206 S. Louisa St. 32°28′31″N 91°45′25″W	Rayville	
8	St. David's Episcopal Church	St. David's Episcopal Church	September 27, 2007 (#07001006)	834 Louisa St. 32°28′27″N 91°45′29″W	Rayville	
9	Trio Plantation House		February 26, 1999 (#99000257)	312 Trio Rd. 32°32′00″N 91°43′07″W	Rayville vicinity	
10	Vickers House	Vickers House	May 15, 1986 (#86001056)	Louisiana Highway 15; 32°21′30″N 91°51′37″W	Alto	Greek Revival house from c.1870 deemed most significant historical architecture in Richland Parish

== Former listing ==
	Name on the Register	Image	Date listed	Date removed	Location	City or town	Description
3	Mangham State Bank Building		May 9, 1985 (#85000975)	May 2, 2016	Main and Horace Sts. 32°18′29″N 91°46′33″W	Mangham	

== See also ==
- List of National Historic Landmarks in Louisiana
- National Register of Historic Places listings in Louisiana
