= Girard, Louisiana =

- Community Settlement
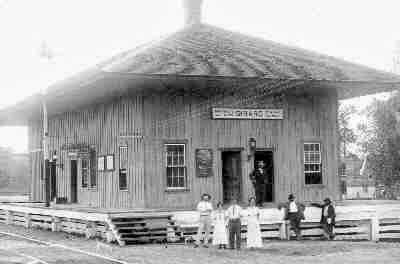
- Girard Rail Depot (no longer exists.)

- Location in Louisiana
- Coordinates: 32°28′55″N 91°48′23″W
- Country: United States
- State: Louisiana
- Parish: Richland
- Girard's Plantation: 1821
- Founder: Stephen Girard, Henry Bry

Girard is an unincorporated community in Richland Parish, Louisiana, United States.

== Geography ==
Girard is located on the west bank of Boeuf River. US Hwy 80 and the Kansas City Southern railroad also pass through Girard. At the time it was first settled, it fell into the historical boundaries of Ouachita Parish, and later Morehouse Parish, both predating the creation of present-day Richland Parish, which was established in 1868.

== History ==
Girard is often referenced as the oldest known (non Native-American) settlement in Richland Parish.

=== Named for Stephen Girard ===
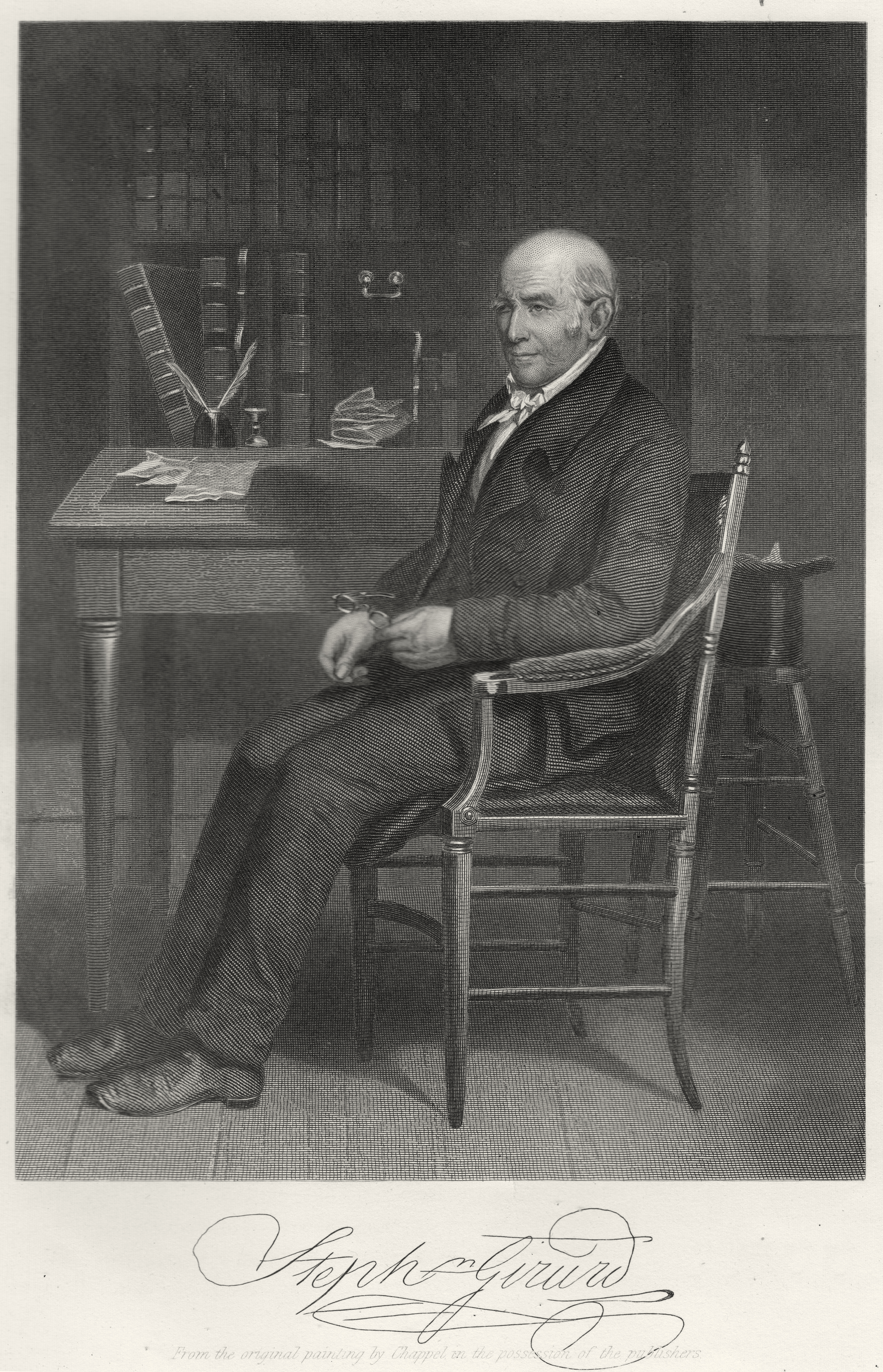
Portrait of Stephen Girard

Girard was named for the wealthy shipping merchant and financier, Stephen Girard, of Philadelphia. Well before construction of the railroad, Girard's location along Boeuf River provided a valuable means for transporting both labor as well as agricultural goods and supplies to markets downriver such as New Orleans.

=== Baron de Bastrop and Abraham Morehouse ===
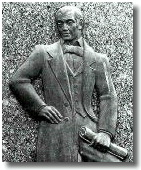
Baron de Bastrop

Girard purchased the land for Girard from Col. Abraham Morehouse. The land and title had been under some dispute as a result of its original claimant, the Baron de Bastrop. In 1821, Girard financed the settlement of a plantation here, under oversight from his friend Henry Bry, of Monroe. In its earliest days, Girard primarily consisted of "Girard's Plantation."

Stephen Girard's hope that Boeuf River could serve as a navigable shipping channel to New Orleans did prove to be true. Boeuf River, however, was difficult to navigate in low-water seasons and the success of its utilization did present considerable challenges.

=== Willed to New Orleans and Philadelphia ===
Stephen Girard had no heirs, and thus wrote a unique clause in his will, providing for management and oversight of the plantation to his friend, Henry Bry, for a total of twenty years, with instruction to then deed the plantation and all valued property (including slaves) to the cities of Philadelphia and New Orleans. A lawsuit would ultimately be required to resolve the ownership of Girard. The plantation was eventually dissolved and the lands were auctioned off.

=== Railroad ===
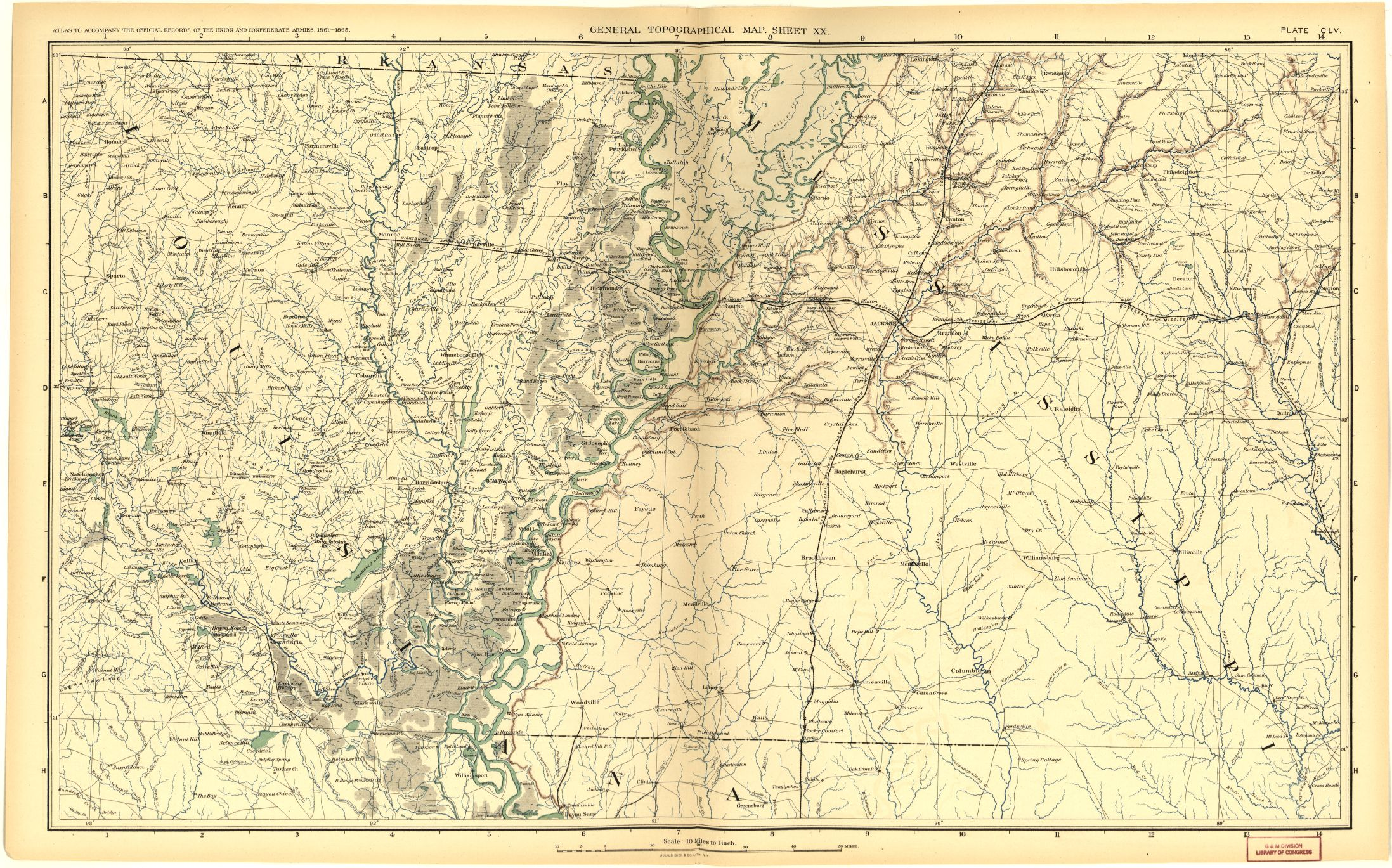
Map showing Girard on the unfinished railroad lines at the start of the American Civil War.

In 1860, a railroad was under construction but had not been completed as the American Civil War began. Early in the war, rail use was still possible for transporting soldiers from Girard to stations to the east, but was later tactically destroyed by Union troops to prevent usage by the Confederacy as the Siege of Vicksburg began.

=== Post Civil War ===
Following the Civil War, the rail line was completed from Monroe to Vicksburg, and Girard station became an equally valuable transport location for goods being moved from river to rail. Steamboats continued to utilize Boeuf River with Girard as a docking location up until the latter part of the 19th-century. At one time, Girard consisted of a hotel, race track, several doctors offices, a post office, school, and train depot.

=== Growth of Rayville; fire destruction ===
When Richland Parish was founded in 1868, Girard became a logical consideration as the parish seat. John Ray, a Whig party supporter who had opposed secession while becoming a landholder with considerable property to the east of Girard, pushed for an alternative location. Ray was an elected state legislator from Monroe, but was the driving force behind the cause of a new parish. After Ray passed legislation creating the new parish, the new town of Rayville, named for its founder John Ray, was officially declared as the parish seat.

In 1895, a fire destroyed several of the commercial buildings and stores in Girard.

== 20th century ==
As the railroad continually became a more prominent mode of transporting crops and commuting settlers, Girard's location on Boeuf River further decreased in value. As settlements developed to its east and west, Girard continued to lose significance as a commercial hub throughout the 20th century.

== 21st century ==
Girard in the 21st century serves almost solely as a bedroom community. There are no longer any businesses, churches, or schools, and Boeuf River is no longer maintained as a navigable waterway. The train station and post office also no longer exist. Girard Cemetery is essentially all that visibly remains from the original location of Girard's plantation.
