= Bayou Macon =

River in the United States of America

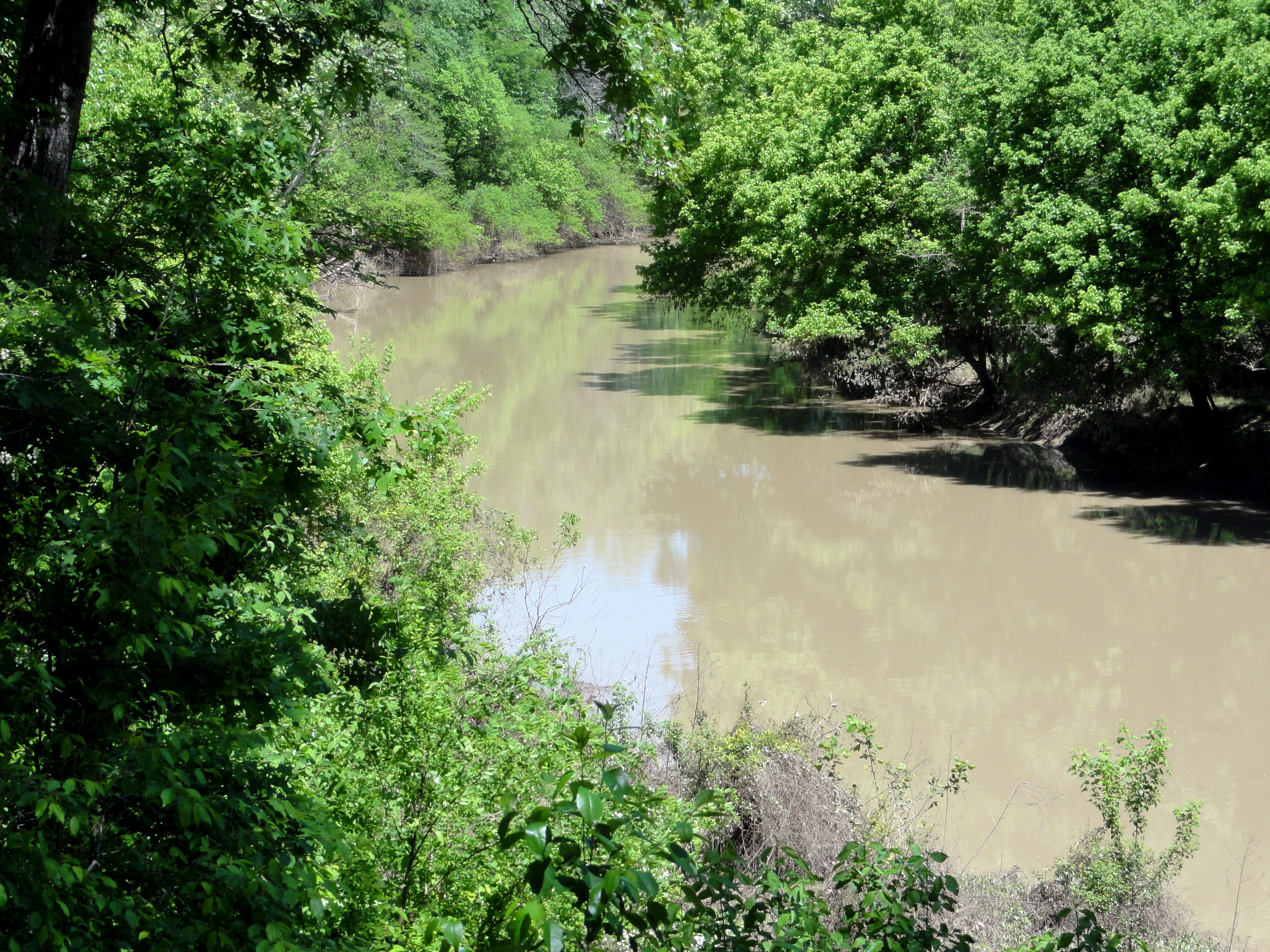
- Bayou Macon as seen from Poverty Point Reservoir State Park
- Bayou Macon

Location
- Country: United States
- States: Arkansas; Louisiana
- County: Chicot
- Parishes: West Carroll; East Carroll; Richland; Madison; Franklin

Physical characteristics
- Source
  - location: Desha County, Arkansas
  - coordinates: 33°46′15″N 91°26′15″W
- Mouth: Confluence with the Tensas River
  - location: Catahoula Parish, Louisiana
  - coordinates: 31°54′49″N 91°32′52″W
  - elevation: 33 ft.
- Length: 218 miles (351 km)
- Discharge
  - location: Delhi, Louisiana
  - average: 844 cu/ft. per sec.

Bayou Macon is a bayou in Arkansas and Louisiana. It begins in Desha County, Arkansas, and flows south, between the Boeuf River to its west and the Mississippi River to its east, before joining Joe's Bayou south of Delhi in Richland Parish, Louisiana. Bayou Macon is about 218 miles (351 km) long.

The bayou area saw action during the American Civil War including from the 1st Regiment Kansas Volunteer Infantry in May 1863 in the areas then known as Caledonia and Pin Hook.

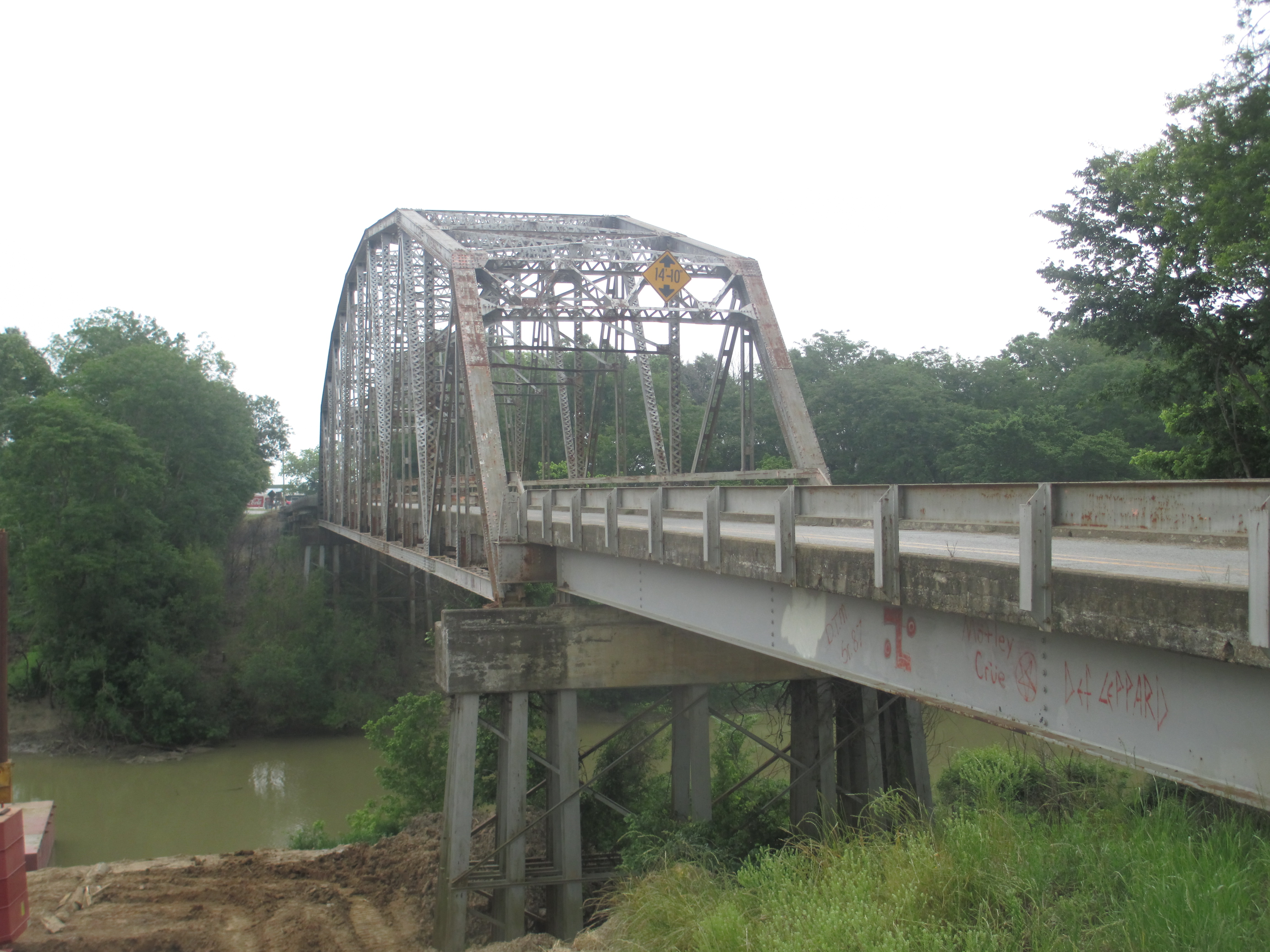
This 1962 bridge over Bayou Macon (2013 photograph) between East and West Carroll Parish in northeastern Louisiana was replaced effective March 24, 2014 with a new structure valued at $4.6 million. Some seven hundred vehicles on Louisiana Highway 134 cross the bridge daily. Governor Bobby Jindal came to West Carroll Parish for the bridge dedication.

The Bayou Macon Wildlife Management Area comprises 6,919 acres in East Carroll Parish and was acquired by the Louisiana Department of Wildlife and Fisheries in 1991.

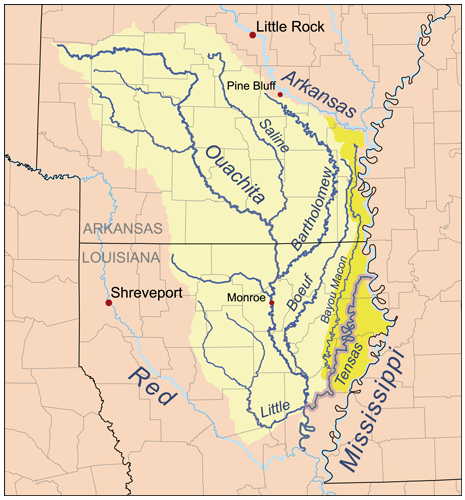
Watershed Map of Bayou Macon
