= Miles-Hanna House =

Historic house in Louisiana, United States

- U.S. National Register of Historic Places
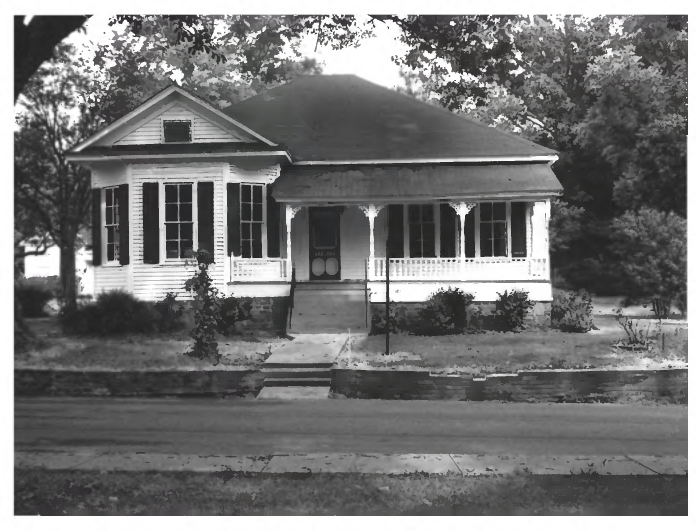

- Location within Louisiana Location within the United States
- Location: 206 Charter, Delhi, Louisiana
- Coordinates: 32°27′31″N 91°29′36″W
- Area: less than one acre
- Built: 1892
- Architectural style: Queen Anne, Stick/eastlake
- NRHP reference No.: 96001161
- Added to NRHP: October 18, 1996

The Miles-Hanna House, located at 206 Charter in Delhi, Louisiana, was built in 1892. It was listed on the National Register of Historic Places in 1996.

It is a frame one-story Queen Anne house with Eastlake details.

It was built in 1892 for Harriet Purvis Miles and Frank A. Miles, Sr., who had married on October 28, 1891. It remained in the family until 1989. The house was deemed to be a local landmark, and it was noted that "while a middle-class Queen Anne cottage of the type represented by the Miles-Hanna House would be typical in many Louisiana communities, it stands out in Delhi."

In 1996 the house was owned by the town of Delhi and was operated as a local history museum.

== See also ==
- Vickers House: another historic house in Richland Parish
- National Register of Historic Places listings in Richland Parish, Louisiana
