= St. David's Episcopal Church (Rayville, Louisiana) =

Historic church in Louisiana, United States

- U.S. National Register of Historic Places
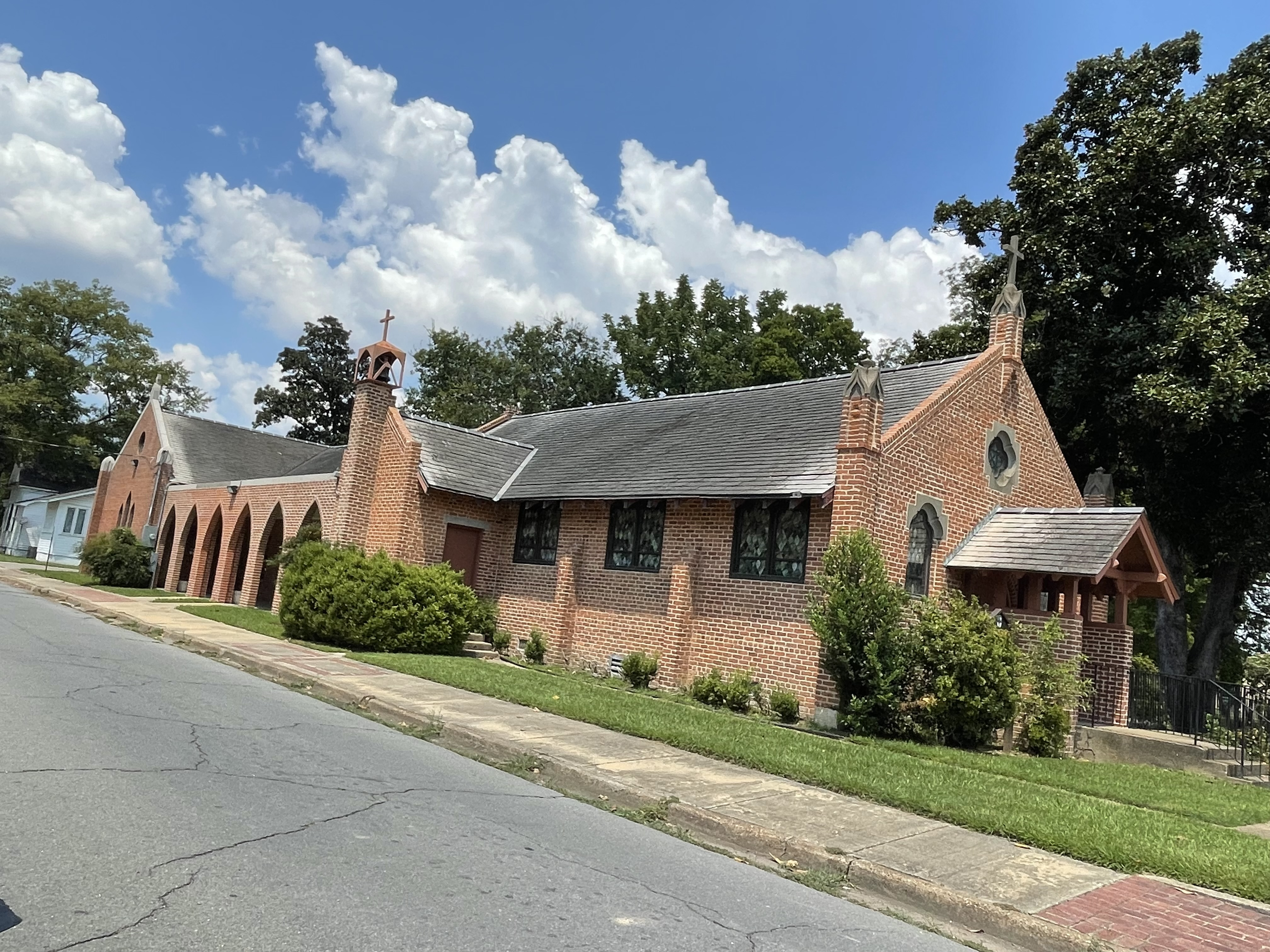

- Location within Louisiana Location within the United States
- Location: 834 Louisa St., Rayville, Louisiana
- Coordinates: 32°28′27″N 91°45′29″W
- Area: less than one acre
- Built: 1909
- Architectural style: Gothic Revival, Bungalow/craftsman
- NRHP reference No.: 07001006
- Added to NRHP: September 27, 2007

The St. David's Episcopal Church at 834 Louisa Street in Rayville, Louisiana was built in 1909. It was added to the National Register of Historic Places in 2007.

It is a one-story brick building with cast stone ornament. Its architecture shows influence of both Gothic Revival and Craftsman styles.

It was deemed " a rare architectural landmark in a community with few examples of high style architecture."

== See also ==
- Poplar Chapel AME Church also in Rayville
- National Register of Historic Places listings in Richland Parish, Louisiana
