= Poplar Chapel AME Church =

Historic church in Louisiana, United States

- U.S. National Register of Historic Places
- Location within Louisiana Location within the United States
- Location: Louisiana Highway 135, southwest of Rayville, Louisiana
- Coordinates: 32°23′55″N 91°50′2″W
- Area: less than one acre
- Built: 1903
- NRHP reference No.: 89000475
- Added to NRHP: June 2, 1989

Poplar Chapel AME Church was a historic African Methodist Episcopal church near Rayville, Louisiana. Located on Louisiana Highway 135, it was built in 1903. It was added to the National Register in 1989.

It was a four bay basilica style church with vaguely Queen Anne Revival and Romanesque Revival style influences. It was deemed notable "as a rare survivor of a vernacular archetype".

However, the chapel has been destroyed.

== See also ==
- St. David's Episcopal Church (Rayville, Louisiana)
- National Register of Historic Places listings in Richland Parish, Louisiana
