= Vickers House =

- U.S. National Register of Historic Places
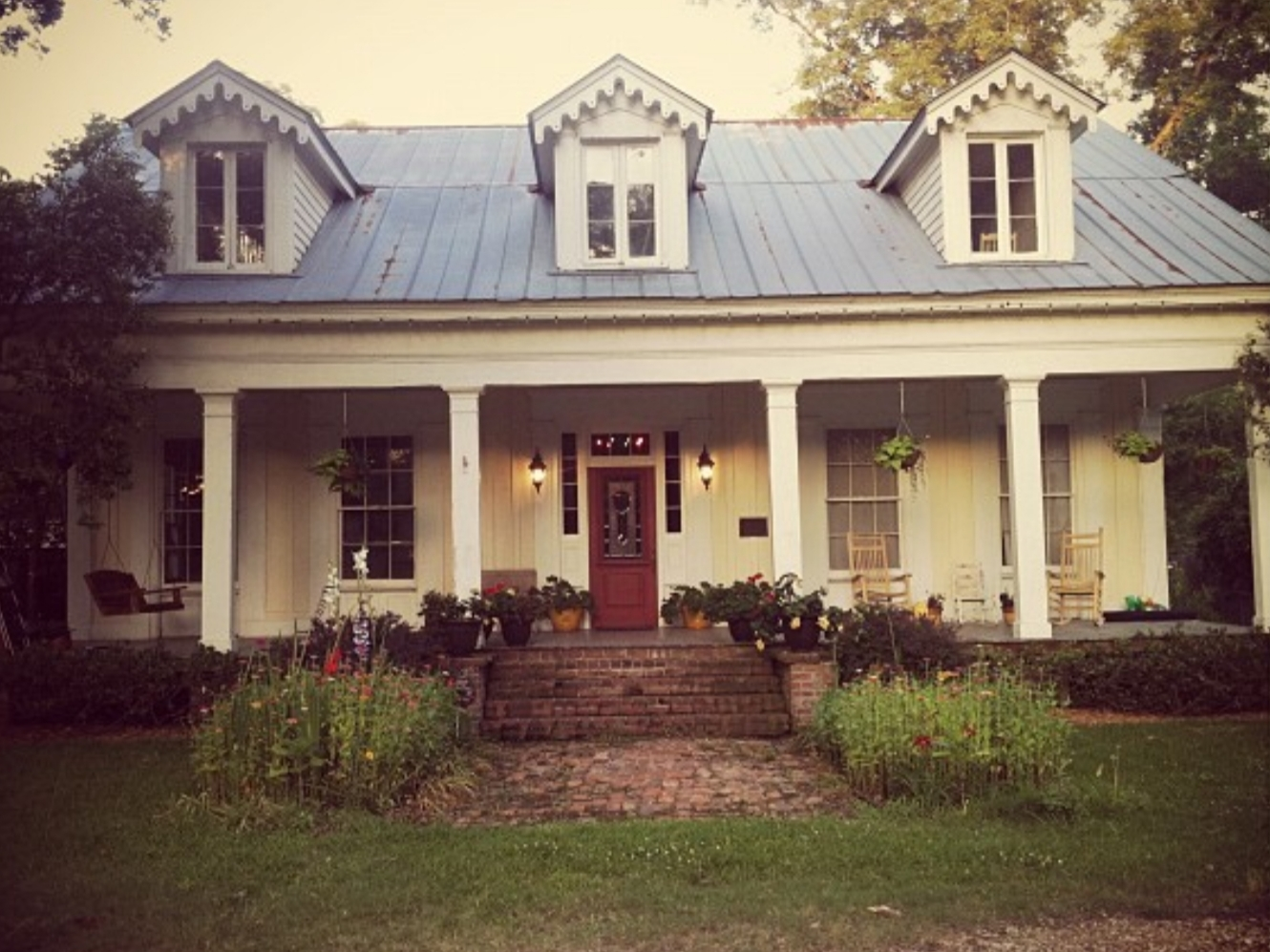

- Location within Louisiana
- Location: LA 15, Alto, Louisiana
- Coordinates: 32.35824°N 91.86026°W
- Area: 0.7 acres (0.28 ha)
- Built: c. 1870
- Architect: Capt. Vickers
- Architectural style: Greek Revival
- NRHP reference No.: 86001056
- Added to NRHP: May 15, 1986

The Vickers House, on Louisiana Highway 15 in the rural Richland Parish, Louisiana community of Alto, Louisiana, was built around 1870. It was listed on the National Register of Historic Places in 1986.

It is Greek Revival in style; its gallery along the front of the house has six Tuscan order columns.

Its interior woodwork of mantels and doors, etc., is almost all false-grained (painted to resemble wood grain).

It is significant as the most important historical architectural work in Richland Parish. As noted in 1986 the house:

is easily the most important historic building known to exist in Richland Parish. No survey exists for the parish, but the State Historic Preservation Office staff is familiar with the area, having tried on and off for several years to, find Register eligible properties. (Until recently Richland was the only parish without a Register listing.) The parish's patrimony is characterized almost entirely by ordinary bungalows, plain cottages, and pedestrian commercial buildings. The only known exceptions are two early twentieth century bank buildings and the Vickers House. Taken within this context, the Vickers House is of immense architectural importance on the local level. It is the parish's only intact example of the Greek Revival style. (The only other example is a very plain, greatly altered country Greek Revival church.) The Vickers House is also a noteworthy Greek Revival residence for reasons other than rarity. Its impressive front gallery, aedicule motif fenestration, false graining, and overall intactness would establish it as an important example in any parish in northern Louisiana, and most certainly in Richland Parish.

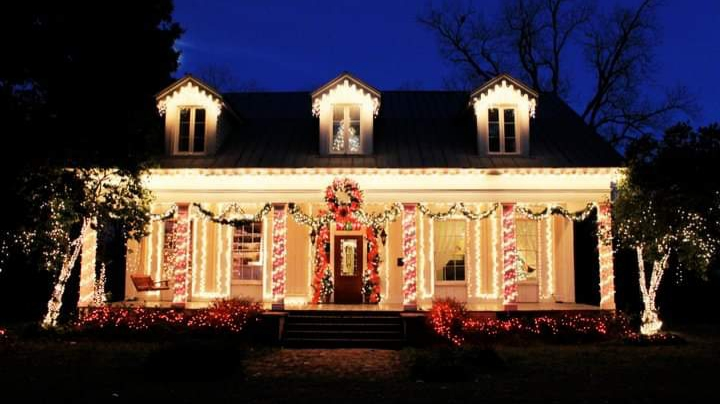
Decorated for Christmas in 2019

== See also ==
- Miles-Hanna House: another historic house in Richland Parish
- National Register of Historic Places listings in Richland Parish, Louisiana
