= John Ray (Louisiana politician) =

American politician 1816–1888

John Ray (1816 – 1888) was a lawyer and politician in Louisiana. He served in the state house in 1844 and the state senate in 1850. He was elected to the U.S. Congress after the war but was prevented from taking office. Rayville, Louisiana is named for him.

He was a Whig and then a Republican. James Ray was his brother.
