= Poverty Point Reservoir State Park =

State park in Louisiana, United States

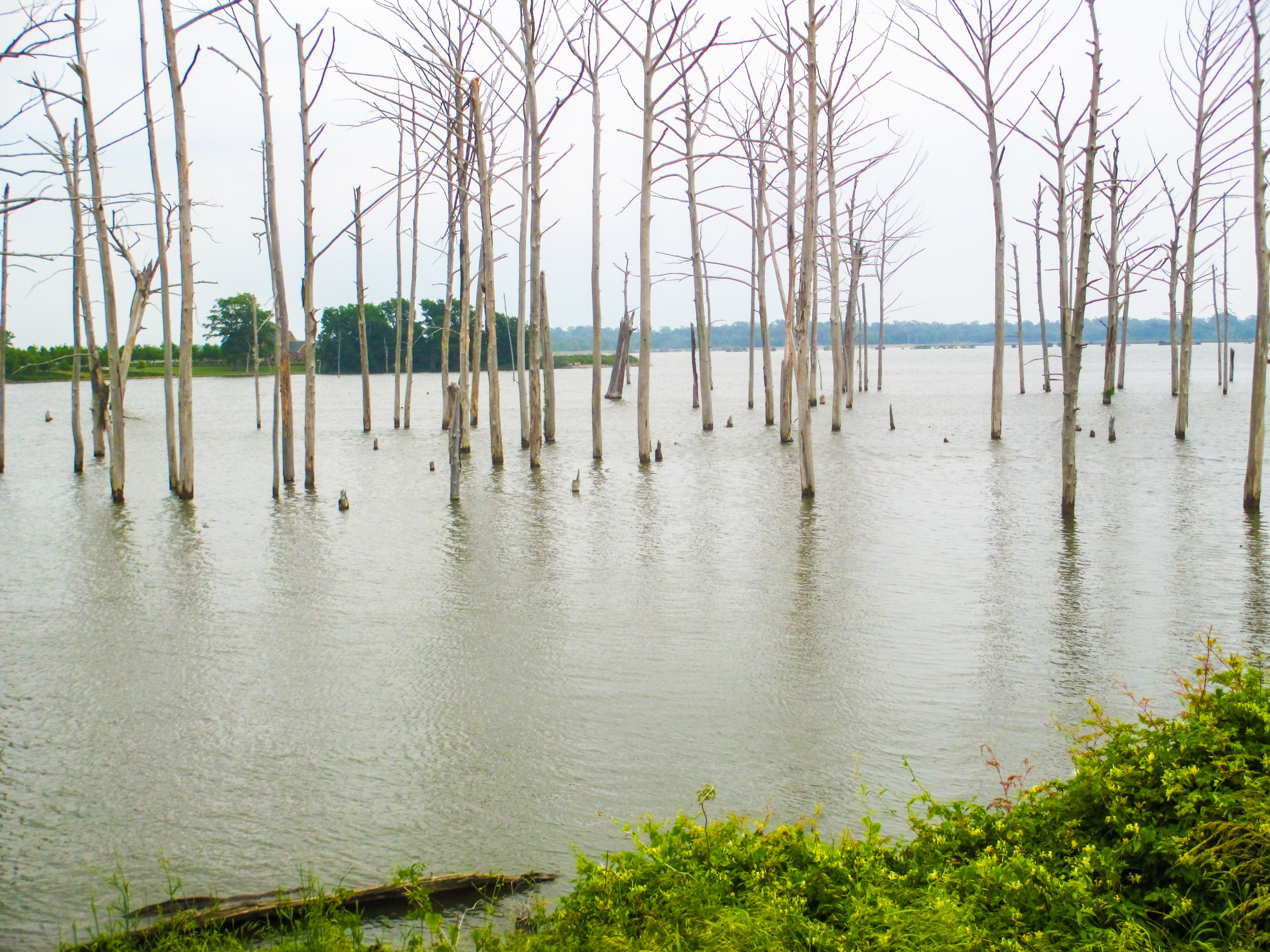
- Poverty Point Reservoir State Park, May 2013

- Location within Louisiana Location within the United States
- Location: Richland Parish, Louisiana, United States of America
- Coordinates: 32°28′57″N 91°29′41″W
- Area: 2,700 acres (11 km^{2}; 4.2 sq mi)
- Established: 2005
- Visitors: 102,406 (in 2022)
- Governing body: Louisiana Office of State Parks
- Website: http://www.crt.state.la.us/parks/ireservoir.aspx

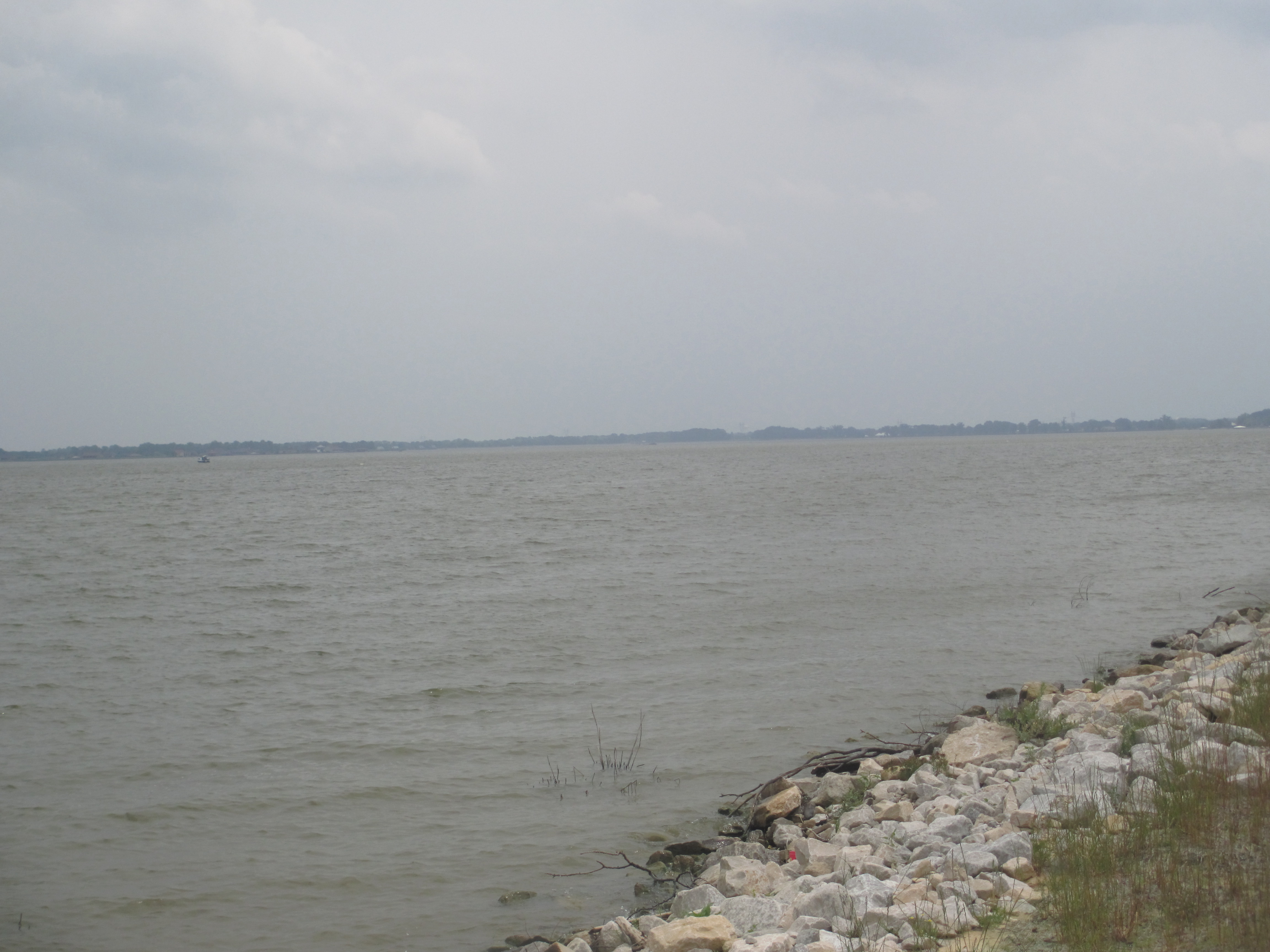
A view of the lake near the state park

Poverty Point Reservoir State Park is a state park in Richland Parish in northeastern Louisiana located along a 2,700-acre (4.2 sq mi) man-made reservoir offering camping and watersport activities, swimming, hiking, and fishing. The reservoir is named after nearby Poverty Point, an archeological site settled between 1,400 and 700 BC consisting of Native American earthworks and other artifacts. The park has eight deluxe cabins, four standard cabins, and fifty-four campsites.

Birding is excellent since the region falls in the Mississippi Flyway for many winged species. Depending on the season, visitors can expect to see cormorants, bald eagles, ducks, geese and pelicans.

Fishing is a supported at the park via a 48 slip marina, boat launch, fish cleaning station, and concession area. Fisherman may expect to catch largemouth bass, black crappie, blue gill and channel catfish.

Visitors may take advantage of the .5-mile (0.80 km) walking trail near Bayou Macon, but should be advised of black bears.
