= Delhi, Louisiana =

- City
- Town of Delhi
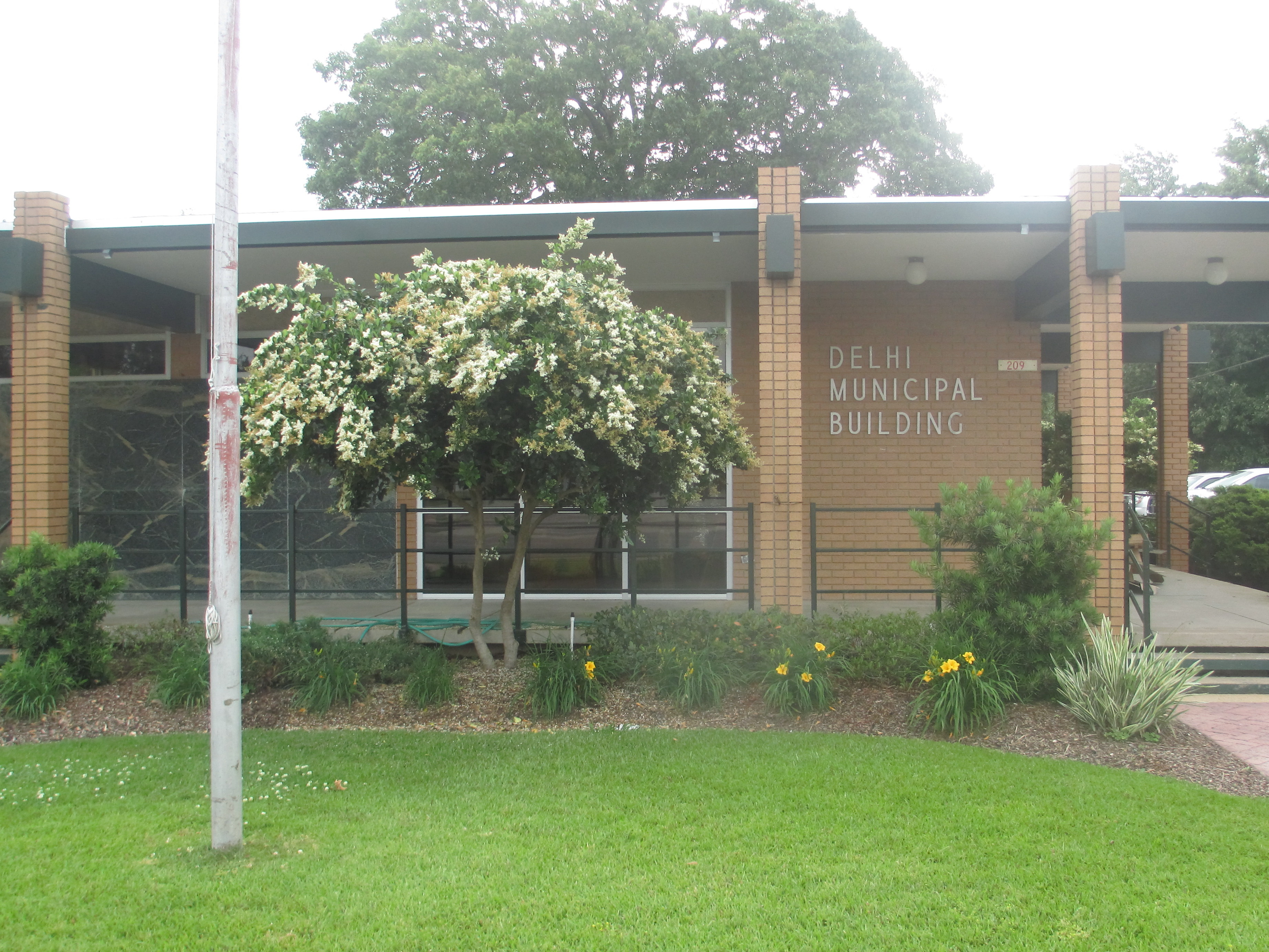
- Delhi City Hall

- Location of Delhi in Richland Parish, Louisiana.

- Location of Louisiana in the United States
- Coordinates: 32°27′13″N 91°29′46″W
- Country: United States
- State: Louisiana
- Parish: Richland

Government
  - Type: Mayor-council
  - Mayor: Jesse Washington(D) (D)

Area
  - Total: 2.94 sq mi (7.62 km^{2})
  - Land: 2.87 sq mi (7.44 km^{2})
  - Water: 0.073 sq mi (0.19 km^{2})
- Elevation: 92 ft (28 m)

Population (2020)
  - Total: 2,622
  - Density: 913.1/sq mi (352.55/km^{2})
- Time zone: UTC-6 (CST)
  - Summer (DST): UTC-5 (CDT)
- ZIP code: 71232
- Area code: 318
- FIPS code: 22-20190
- GNIS feature ID: 2406371
- Website: townofdelhi.municipalimpact.com

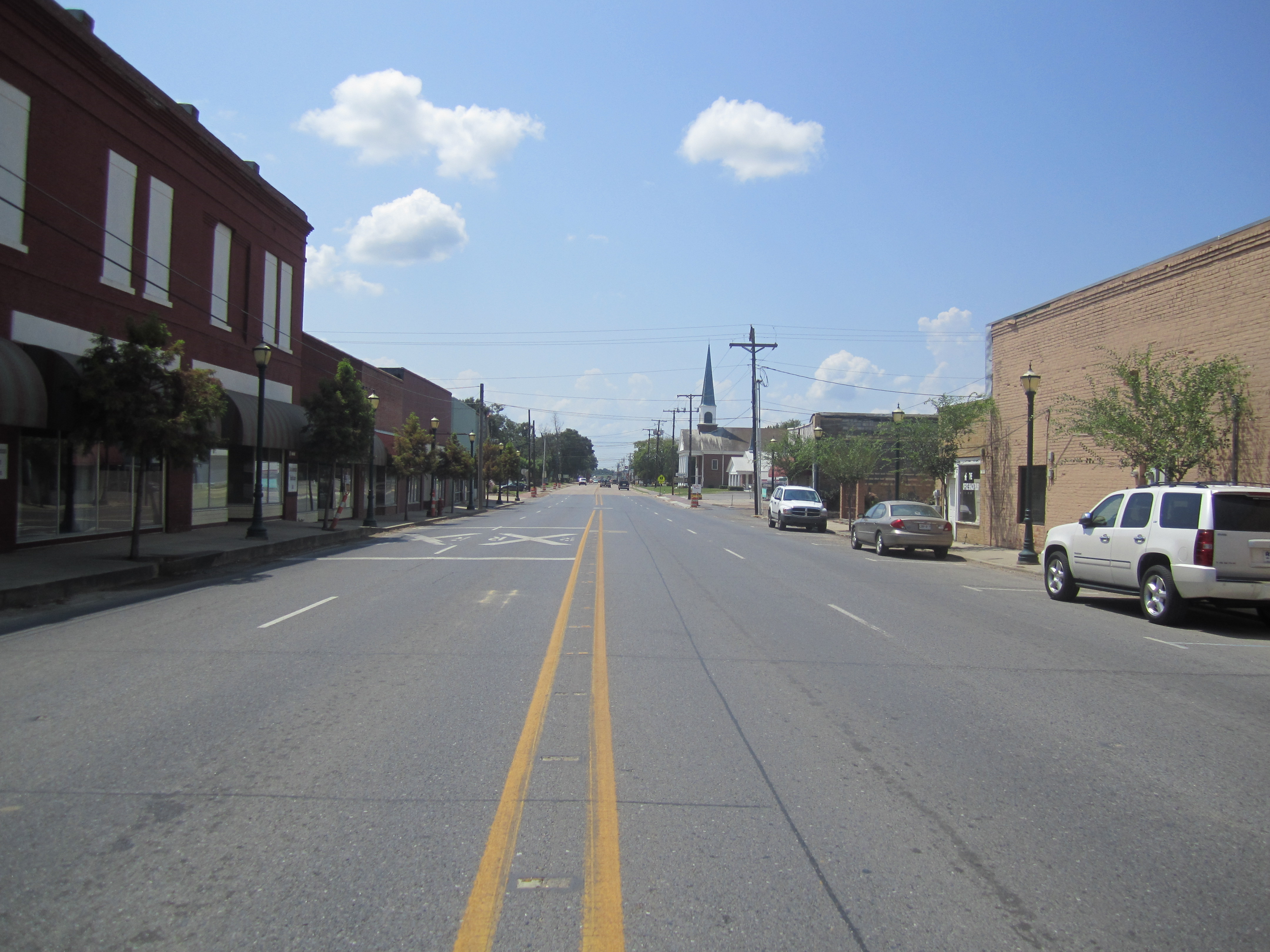
Downtown Delhi looking south along La 17

Delhi (/ˈdɛl.haɪ/), originally called Deerfield, is a town in Richland Parish, Louisiana, United States. As of the 2020 census, the town population was 2,622.

== History ==
In 1890, the Delhi Institute was founded in Delhi, Louisiana; a Black private school affiliated with the A.M.E. church. Delhi Institute was renamed to Lampton College; after a 1907 fire, the campus was moved to Alexandria, Louisiana, before being absorbed sometime after 1945 by Campbell College in Jackson, Mississippi.

In the 1940s, Delhi was the center of a large natural gas boom. Numerous workers came to work in the industry. Several functioning gas fields still surround the town.

From 1968 until 1969, Delhi Fire Department was home to the now-defunct Louisiana State Police – Troop O. The site was abandoned in 1969 after thirteen months' operation, with state services reverting to Troop F in Monroe.

On February 21, 1971, as part of the February 1971 Mississippi Delta tornado outbreak, Louisiana's only recorded F5 tornado struck outside of Delhi. It resulted in forty-seven deaths and was the deadliest F5 tornado to hit the United States since the Jackson, Mississippi, Candlestick Park tornado in 1966. It was the earliest confirmed F5 tornado during a year.

== Geography ==
Delhi is located at 32°27′21″N 91°29′36″W (32.455948, -91.493345). The town lies at the confluence of U.S. Route 80 and Louisiana Highway 17, and near to Interstate 20.

According to the United States Census Bureau, the town has a total area of 2.6 square miles (6.7 km^{2}), of which 2.5 square miles (6.5 km^{2}) is land and 0.1 square mile (2.33%) is water.

The town's elevation of 89 ft (27 m) spared Delhi from the brunt of the Great Mississippi Flood of 1927 that destroyed most of the surrounding Mississippi River Delta area.

The Poverty Point Reservoir, which hosts the acclaimed Black Bear Golf Club and the Poverty Point Reservoir State Park, is located just north of Delhi on Louisiana Highway 17 near Warden. The reservoir project was pushed to fruition by State Senator Francis C. Thompson of Delhi.

== Demographics ==
Historical population
Census	Pop.	Note	%±
1870	186		—
1880	315		69.4%
1890	620		96.8%
1900	507		−18.2%
1910	685		35.1%
1920	980		43.1%
1930	1,043		6.4%
1940	1,192		14.3%
1950	1,861		56.1%
1960	2,514		35.1%
1970	2,887		14.8%
1980	3,290		14.0%
1990	3,169		−3.7%
2000	3,066		−3.3%
2010	2,919		−4.8%
2020	2,622		−10.2%
2025 (est.)	2,519	▼	−3.9%
U.S. Decennial Census

Delhi racial composition as of 2020
Race	Num.	Perc.
White (non-Hispanic)	789	30.09%
Black or African American (non-Hispanic)	1,727	65.87%
Native American	8	0.31%
Asian	8	0.31%
Other/Mixed	44	1.68%
Hispanic or Latino	46	1.75%

As of the 2020 United States census, there were 2,622 people, 1,082 households, and 641 families residing in the town.

== Education ==
Public schools in Richland Parish are operated by the Richland Parish School Board. Three campuses serve the town of Delhi – Delhi Elementary School (Grades PK–4), Delhi Middle School (Grades 5–8), and Delhi High School (Grades 9–12).

Delhi Charter School (DCS) (K–12) is an area charter school.

== Name ==
The origin of the name Delhi is uncertain. According to The Delhi Dispatch, one story says that a Professor Allen chose the name after reading the poem "Lalla Rookh" by Thomas Moore. The other story says that the name stuck when a tree with "Delhi" carved into it was used by travelers for navigation.

== Notable people ==
- Earl Holliman, Golden Globe award-winning film and television actor
- Arlene Howell, Miss Louisiana USA 1958, Miss USA 1958
- Bnois King, jazz and blues musician, born in Delhi
- Bob Love, basketball player, went to high school in Delhi
- Toussaint McCall, blues singer, born in Delhi
- Tim McGraw, country singer
- Andrew "Blueblood" McMahon, Chicago blues bass guitarist
- Pat "Gravy" Patterson, baseball coach at Louisiana Tech University
- Steven Pylant, Republican member of the Louisiana House of Representatives
- Johnny Robinson, NFL player with the Kansas City Chiefs
- Charles Wyly and Sam Wyly, businessmen who endowed Wyly Tower of Learning at Louisiana Tech University

== Gallery ==
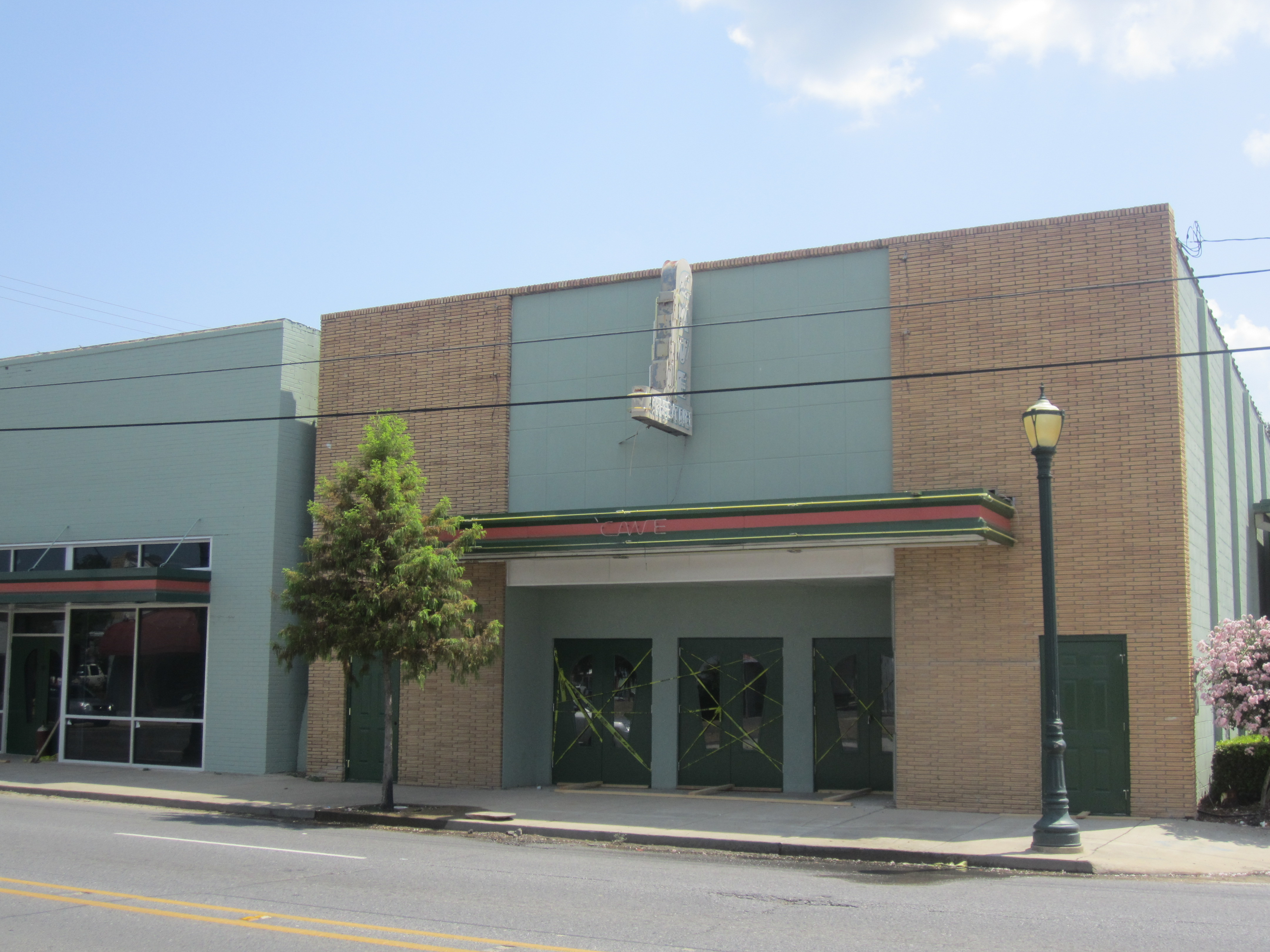
Abandoned theater in downtown Delhi

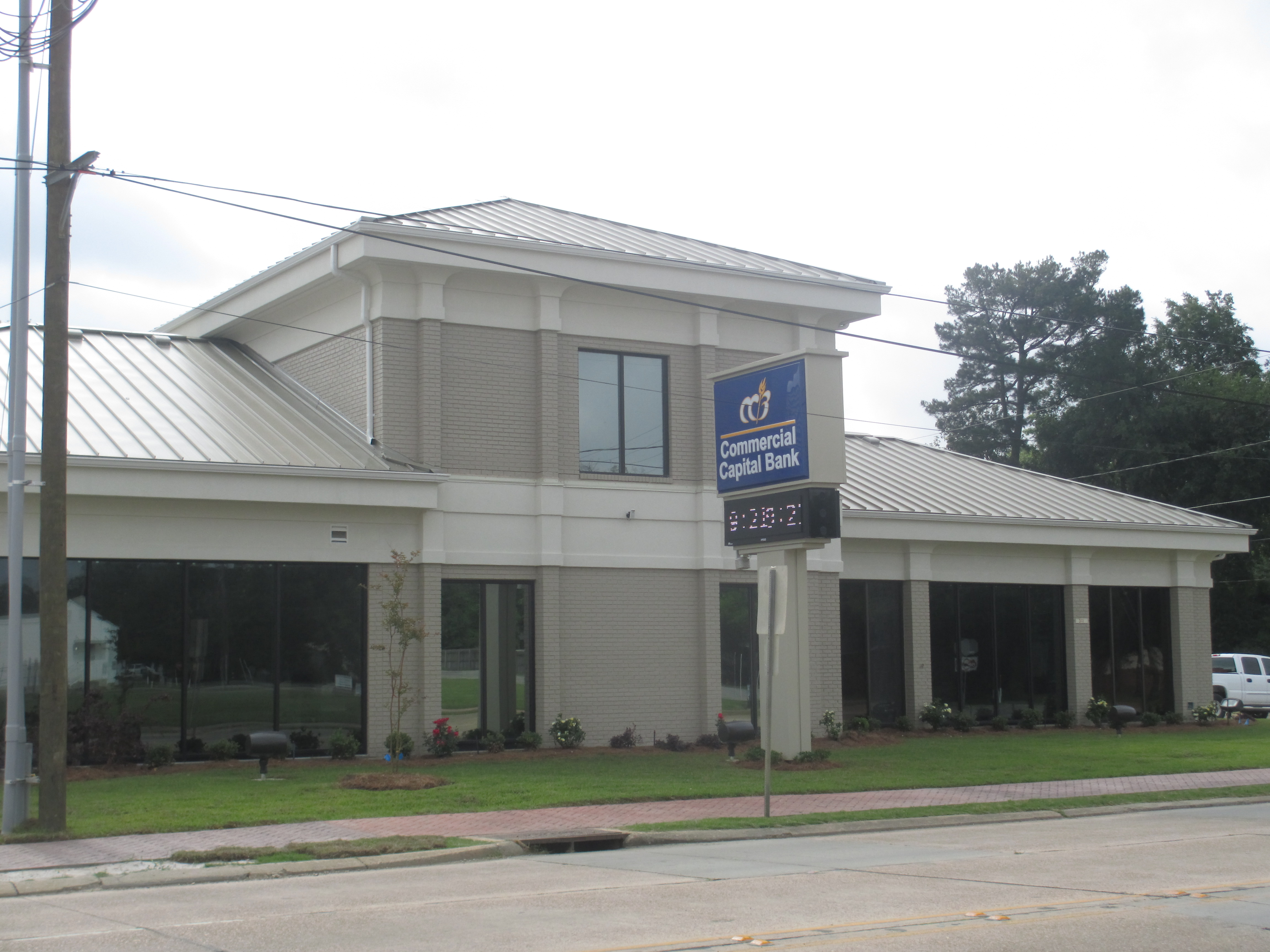
Commercial Capital Bank is located in downtown Delhi across the street from the First Baptist Church.

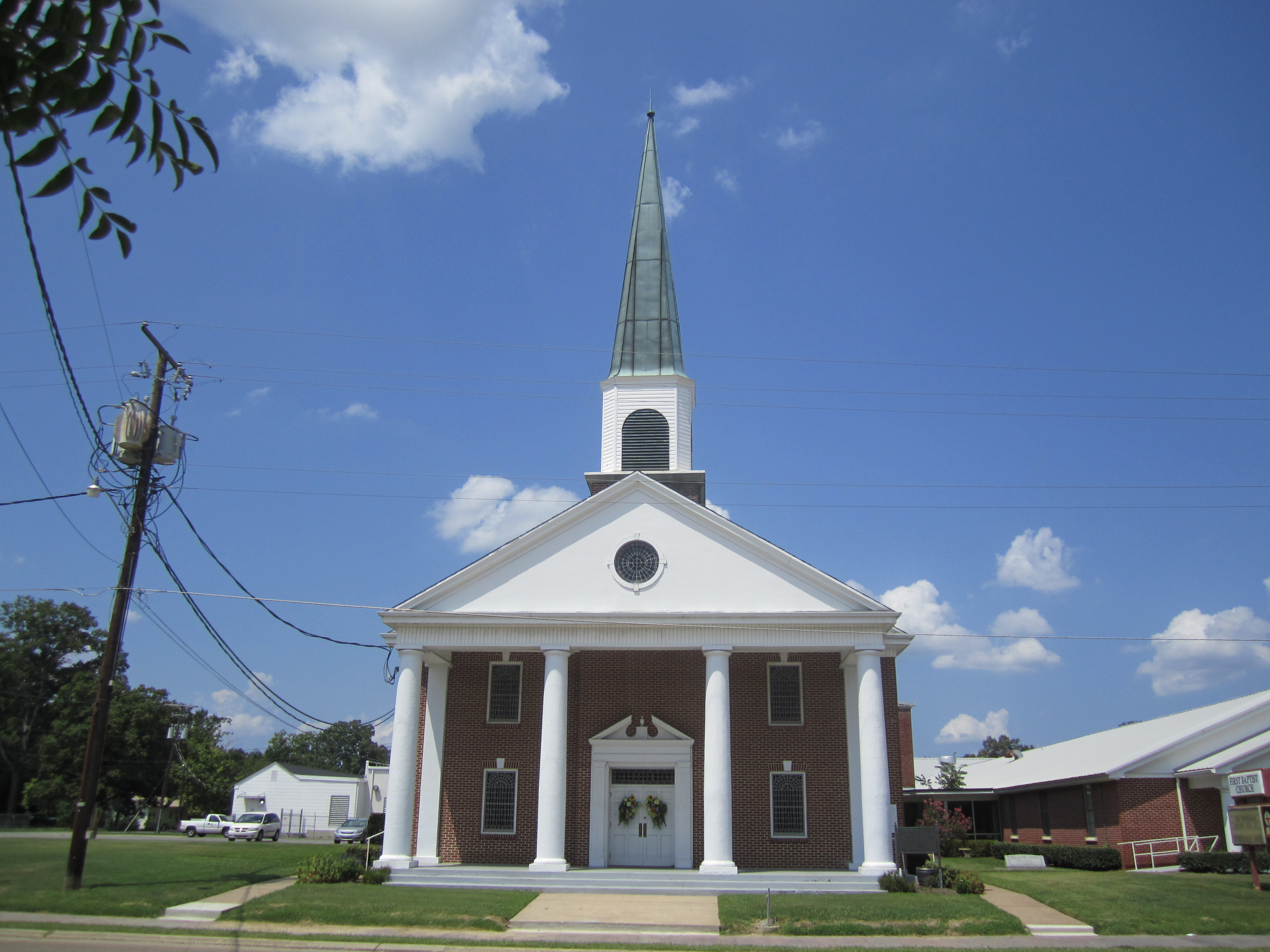
First Baptist Church at 306 Broadway Street in downtown Delhi

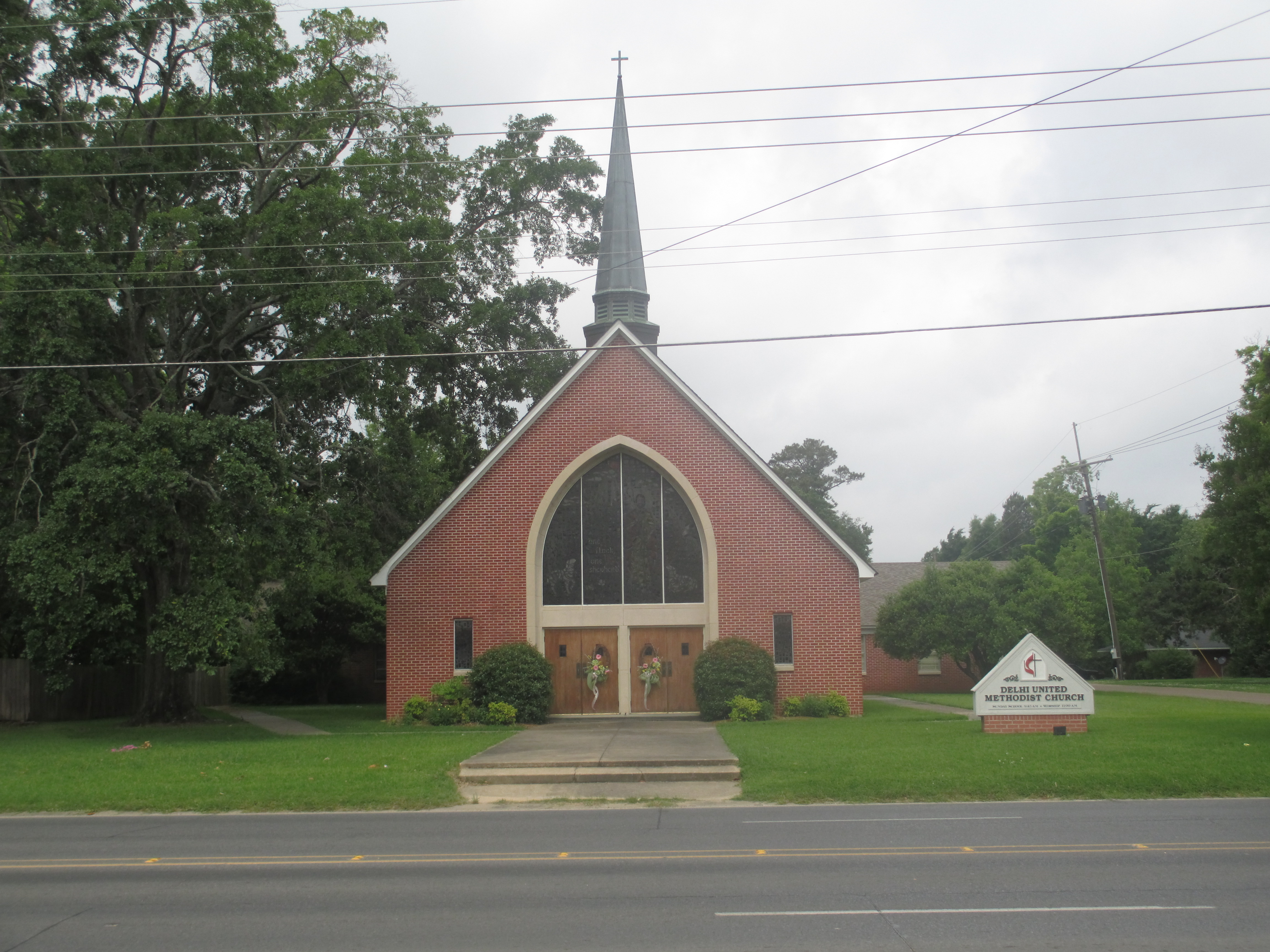
Delhi United Methodist Church is located across the street from Delhi High School.

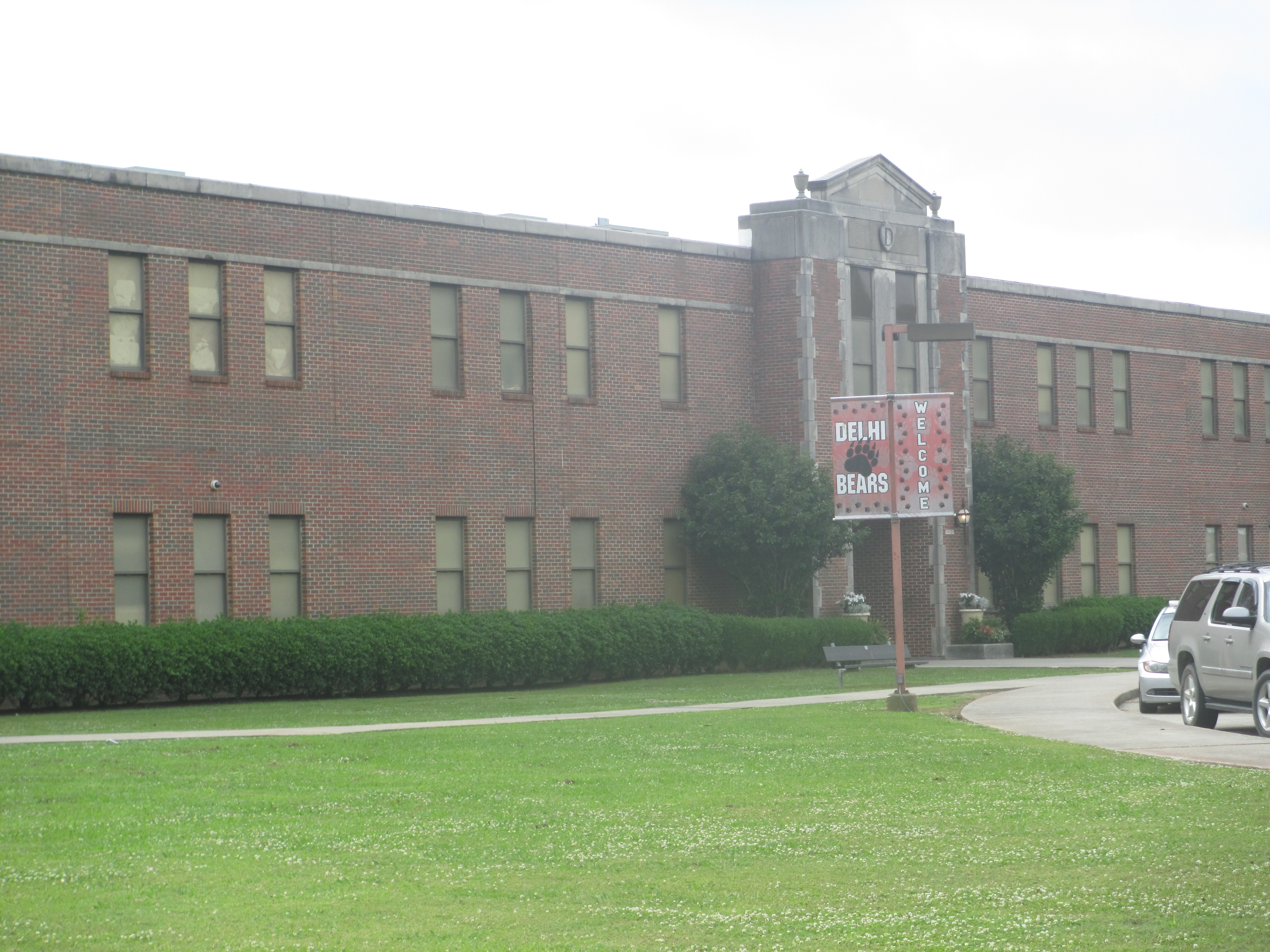
Delhi High School, with mascot "The Bears", is operated by the Richland Parish School Board.

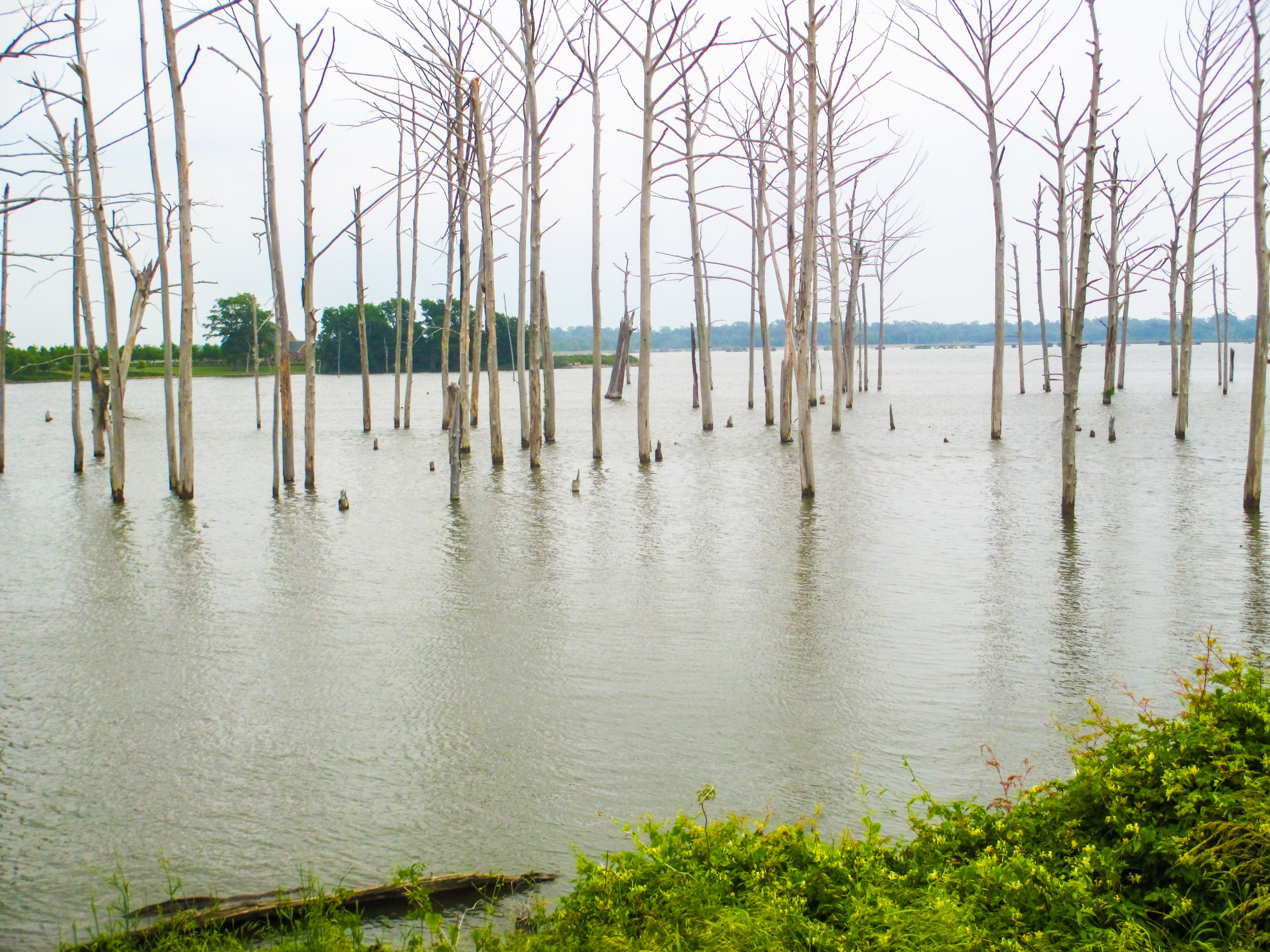
Trees in the reservoir north of Poverty Point Reservoir State Park near Delhi

== See also ==
- KGGM: oldies radio station in Delhi
- Miles-Hanna House: listed on the National Register of Historic Places
