= Alto, Louisiana =

Unincorporated community in Louisiana, U.S.

- Unincorporated community
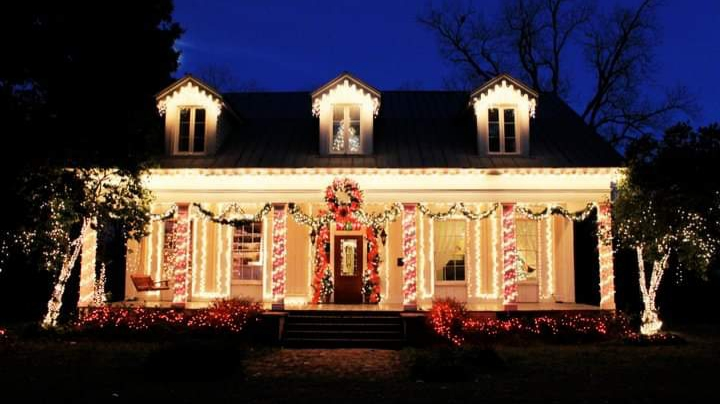
- The Vickers House at Christmas, 2019

- Location within Louisiana Location within the United States
- Coordinates: 32°21′28″N 91°51′35″W
- Country: United States
- State: Louisiana
- Parish: Richland
- Time zone: UTC-6 (Central (CST))
  - Summer (DST): UTC-5 (CDT)
- ZIP code: 71269
- Area code: 318
- GNIS feature ID: 532147

Alto is an unincorporated community in Richland Parish, Louisiana, United States. The Vickers House, an 1870 Greek Revival building, is on the National Register of Historic Places.

== Etymology ==
Alto was likely named due to its lofty elevation.
