= Rayville, Louisiana =

- Town
- Town of Rayville
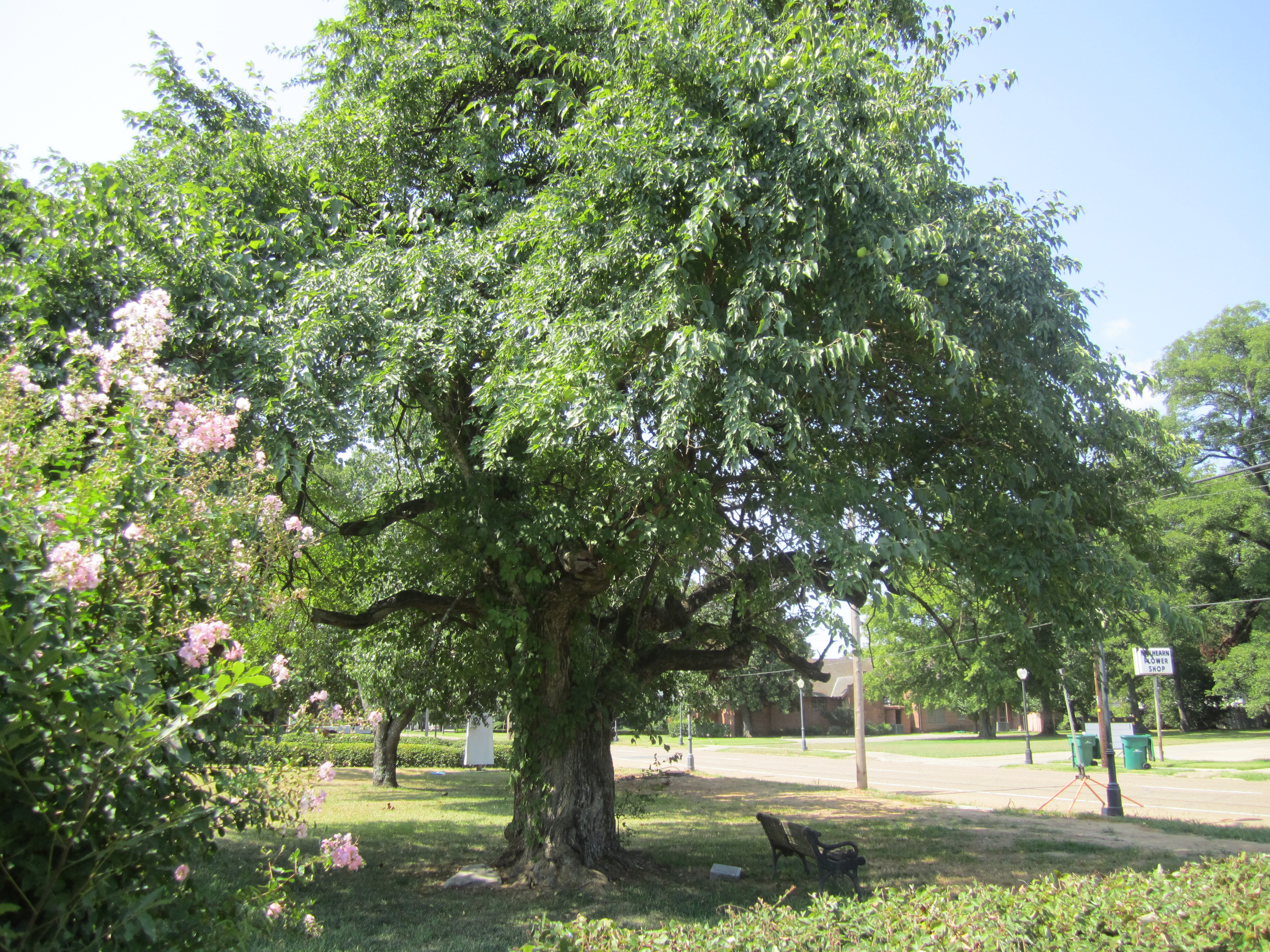
- Bodock tree, the oldest in Rayville, is located between the Civic Center and the Rhymes Memorial Library.

- Location of Rayville in Richland Parish, Louisiana.

- Location of Louisiana in the United States
- Coordinates: 32°28′12″N 91°45′27″W
- Country: United States
- State: Louisiana
- Parish: Richland

Area
  - Total: 2.34 sq mi (6.06 km^{2})
  - Land: 2.31 sq mi (5.98 km^{2})
  - Water: 0.031 sq mi (0.08 km^{2})
- Elevation: 82 ft (25 m)

Population (2020)
  - Total: 3,347
  - Density: 1,449.2/sq mi (559.52/km^{2})
- Time zone: UTC-6 (CST)
  - Summer (DST): UTC-5 (CDT)
- ZIP Code: 71269
- Area code: 318
- FIPS code: 22-63680
- GNIS feature ID: 2407181
- Website: www.townofrayville.com

Rayville is a town in and the parish seat of Richland Parish in northeastern Louisiana, United States. The population was 3,347 in the 2020 census, down nearly 21 percent from 4,234 in 2000.

The City Hall, located next to the U.S. Post Office across from U.S. Highway 80, is named for former Rayville Mayor Joe Kalil (1922–1996).

== History ==
Rayville was named for John Ray.

== Geography ==
According to the United States Census Bureau, the town has a total area of 2.3 square miles (5.9 km^{2}), of which 2.2 square miles (5.8 km^{2}) is land and 0.04 square mile (0.1 km^{2}) (1.32%) is water.

=== Climate ===
Climate data for Rayville, Louisiana (1991–2020)
Month	Jan	Feb	Mar	Apr	May	Jun	Jul	Aug	Sep	Oct	Nov	Dec	Year
Mean daily maximum °F (°C)	57.4 (14.1)	61.6 (16.4)	69.8 (21.0)	77.6 (25.3)	84.0 (28.9)	90.1 (32.3)	92.7 (33.7)	93.6 (34.2)	88.5 (31.4)	80.1 (26.7)	68.3 (20.2)	59.7 (15.4)	77.0 (25.0)
Daily mean °F (°C)	47.7 (8.7)	51.3 (10.7)	59.0 (15.0)	66.6 (19.2)	74.0 (23.3)	80.7 (27.1)	83.5 (28.6)	83.6 (28.7)	77.9 (25.5)	68.0 (20.0)	57.0 (13.9)	49.8 (9.9)	66.6 (19.2)
Mean daily minimum °F (°C)	38.0 (3.3)	41.0 (5.0)	48.2 (9.0)	55.6 (13.1)	64.1 (17.8)	71.4 (21.9)	74.3 (23.5)	73.6 (23.1)	67.2 (19.6)	56.0 (13.3)	45.7 (7.6)	40.0 (4.4)	56.3 (13.5)
Average precipitation inches (mm)	5.54 (141)	5.11 (130)	5.65 (144)	6.70 (170)	5.25 (133)	4.75 (121)	4.16 (106)	3.88 (99)	3.82 (97)	4.63 (118)	4.73 (120)	5.78 (147)	60 (1,526)
Average snowfall inches (cm)	0.3 (0.76)	0.4 (1.0)	0.0 (0.0)	0.0 (0.0)	0.0 (0.0)	0.0 (0.0)	0.0 (0.0)	0.0 (0.0)	0.0 (0.0)	0.0 (0.0)	0.0 (0.0)	0.0 (0.0)	0.7 (1.76)
Source: NOAA

== Demographics ==
Historical population
Census	Pop.	Note	%±
1870	106		—
1880	316		198.1%
1890	366		15.8%
1910	1,079		—
1920	1,499		38.9%
1930	2,976		98.5%
1940	2,412		−19.0%
1950	3,138		30.1%
1960	4,052		29.1%
1970	3,962		−2.2%
1980	4,610		16.4%
1990	4,411		−4.3%
2000	4,234		−4.0%
2010	3,695		−12.7%
2020	3,347		−9.4%
2025 (est.)	3,176	▼	−5.1%
U.S. Decennial Census

=== 2020 census ===
As of the 2020 census, Rayville had a population of 3,347. The median age was 38.3 years. 25.2% of residents were under the age of 18 and 16.8% were 65 years of age or older. For every 100 females there were 86.6 males, and for every 100 females age 18 and over there were 79.1 males age 18 and over.

There were 1,336 households in Rayville, including 892 family households. Of all households, 33.9% had children under the age of 18, 21.0% were married-couple households, 21.9% were households with a male householder and no spouse or partner present, and 48.8% were households with a female householder and no spouse or partner present. About 33.8% of all households were made up of individuals and 13.1% had someone living alone who was 65 years of age or older.

0.0% of residents lived in urban areas, while 100.0% lived in rural areas. There were 1,479 housing units, of which 9.7% were vacant. The homeowner vacancy rate was 2.3% and the rental vacancy rate was 5.3%.

Rayville racial composition as of 2020
Race	Num.	Perc.
White (non-Hispanic)	727	21.72%
Black or African American (non-Hispanic)	2,424	72.42%
Native American	8	0.24%
Asian	19	0.57%
Other/Mixed	108	3.23%
Hispanic or Latino	61	1.82%

== Education ==
Public schools in Richland Parish are operated by the Richland Parish School Board. Three campuses serve the town of Rayville - Rayville Elementary School (Grades PK-6), Rayville Junior High School (Grades 7–8), and Rayville High School (Grades 9–12). Rayville is also served by Riverfield Academy (Grades PK-12) a non-denominational private school.

== Notable people ==
- Ralph Abraham, politician
- William L. Kirk, Four Star General U S Air Force
- George Ballas; invented of the “Weed Eater” line trimmer
- Garland Boyette, football player
- Reggie Burnette, football player
- Charles "Bubba" Chaney, state representative from Rayville
- Hardy Fox, co-founder and primary composer of the avant-garde music group The Residents
- Bunny Greenhouse, U.S. Army Corps of Engineers whistleblower
- Elvin Hayes, Hall of Fame basketball player
- Edgar Jones, Baltimore Ravens football player
- Ernie Ladd, professional wrestler and football player
- Roosevelt Potts, Indianapolis Colts football player
- Stanley Williams, one of the early leaders of the Crips.

== Gallery ==
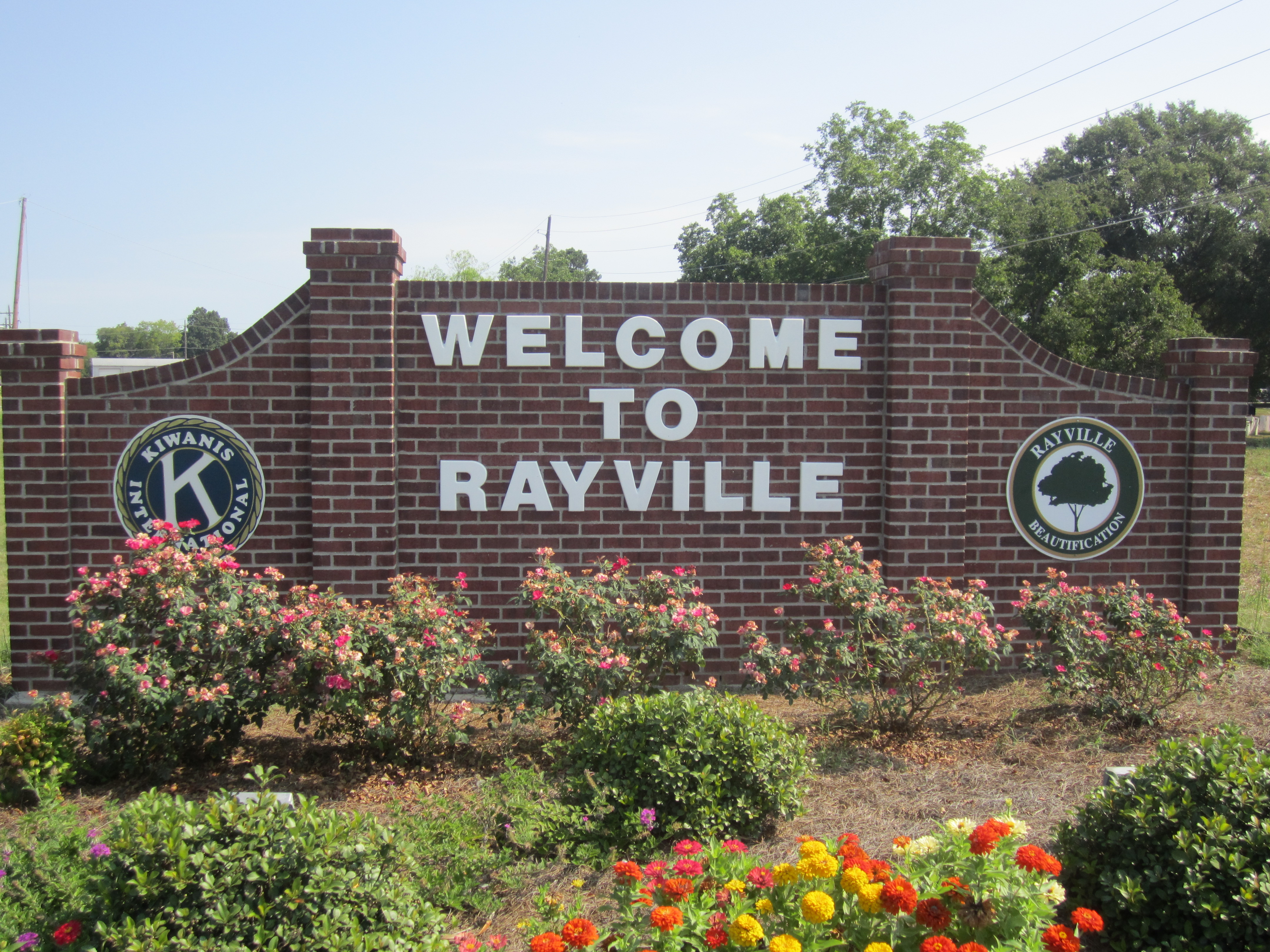
Rayville welcome sign

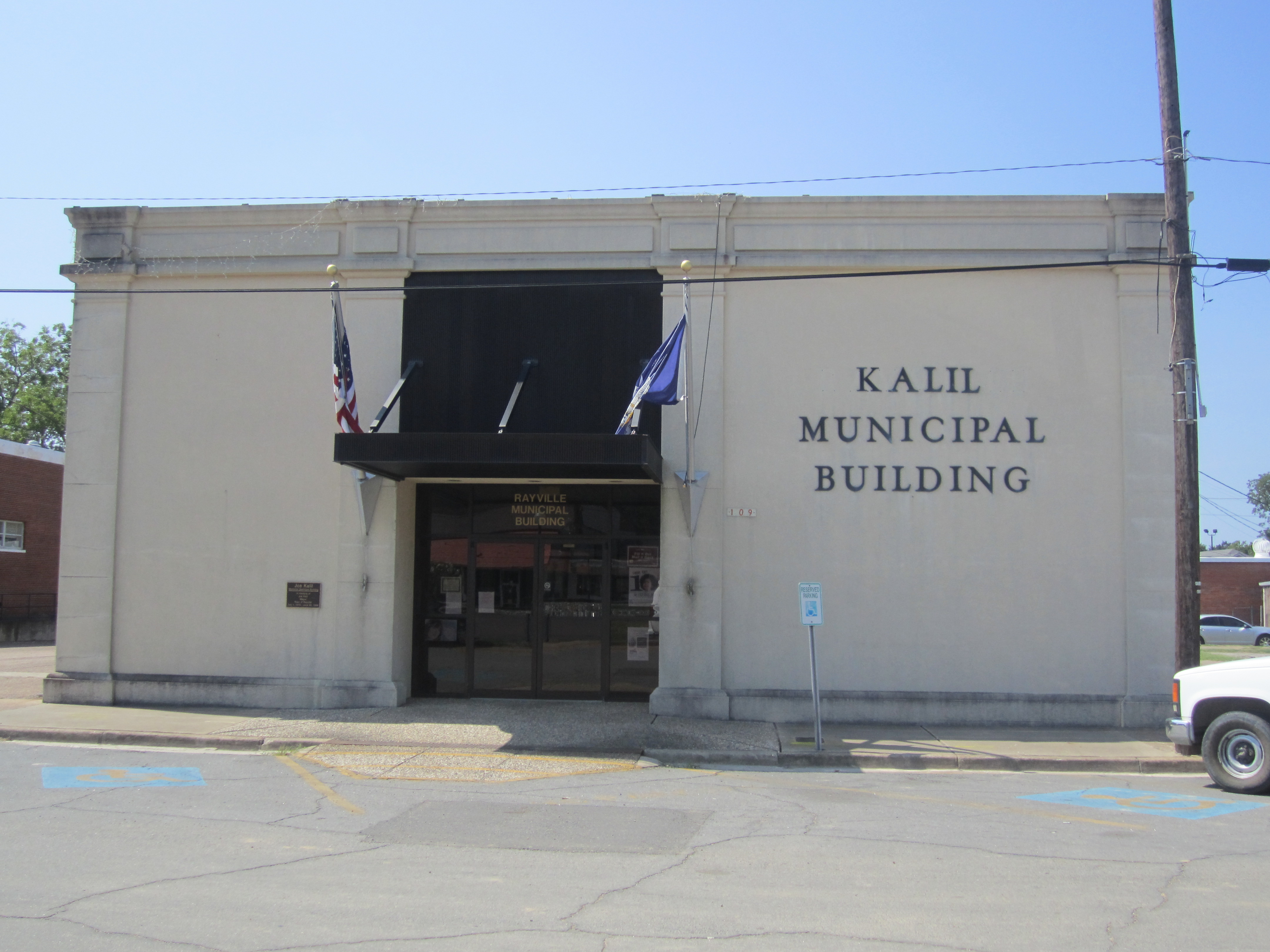
Kalil Municipal Building

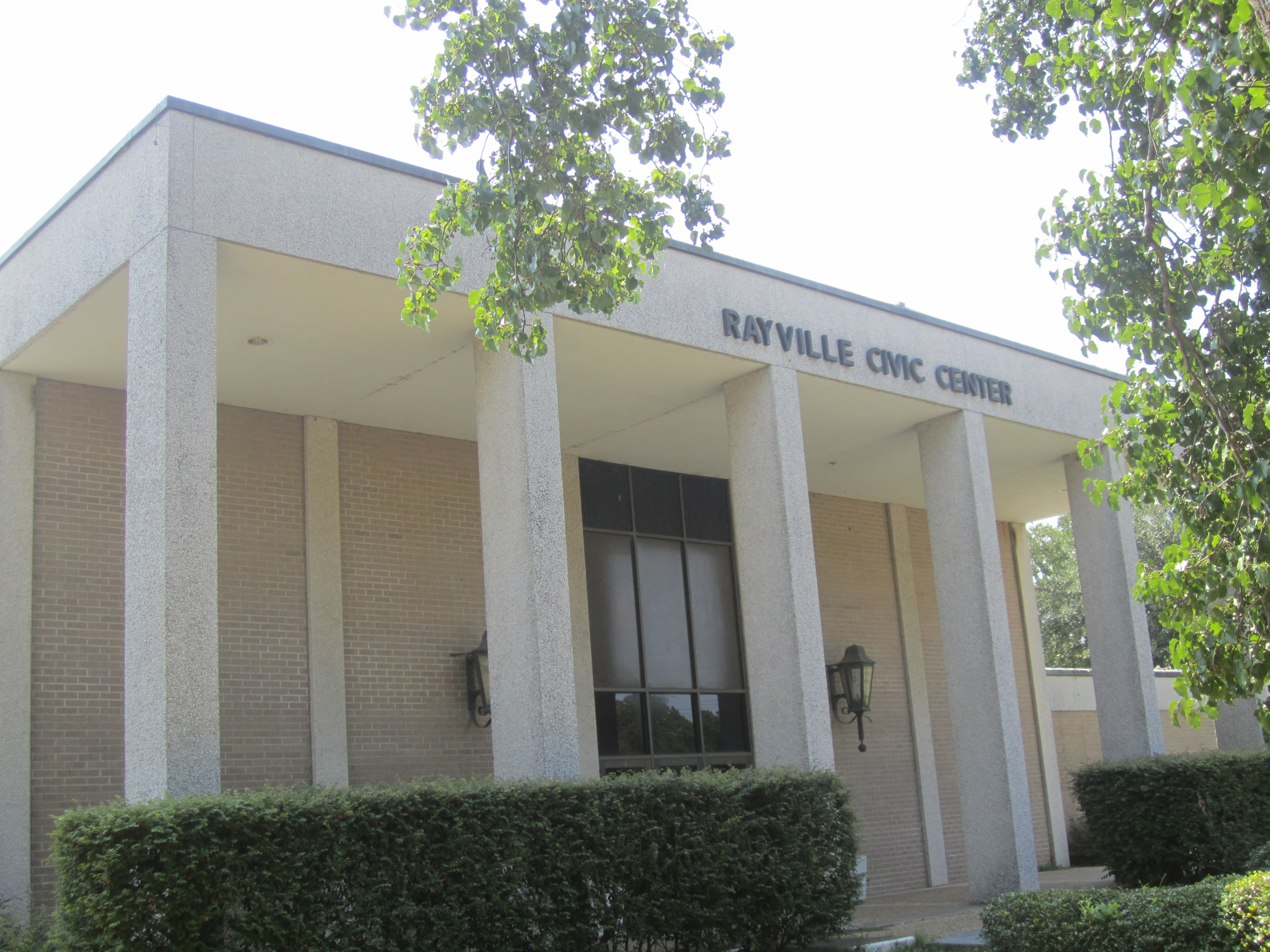
Rayville Civic Center

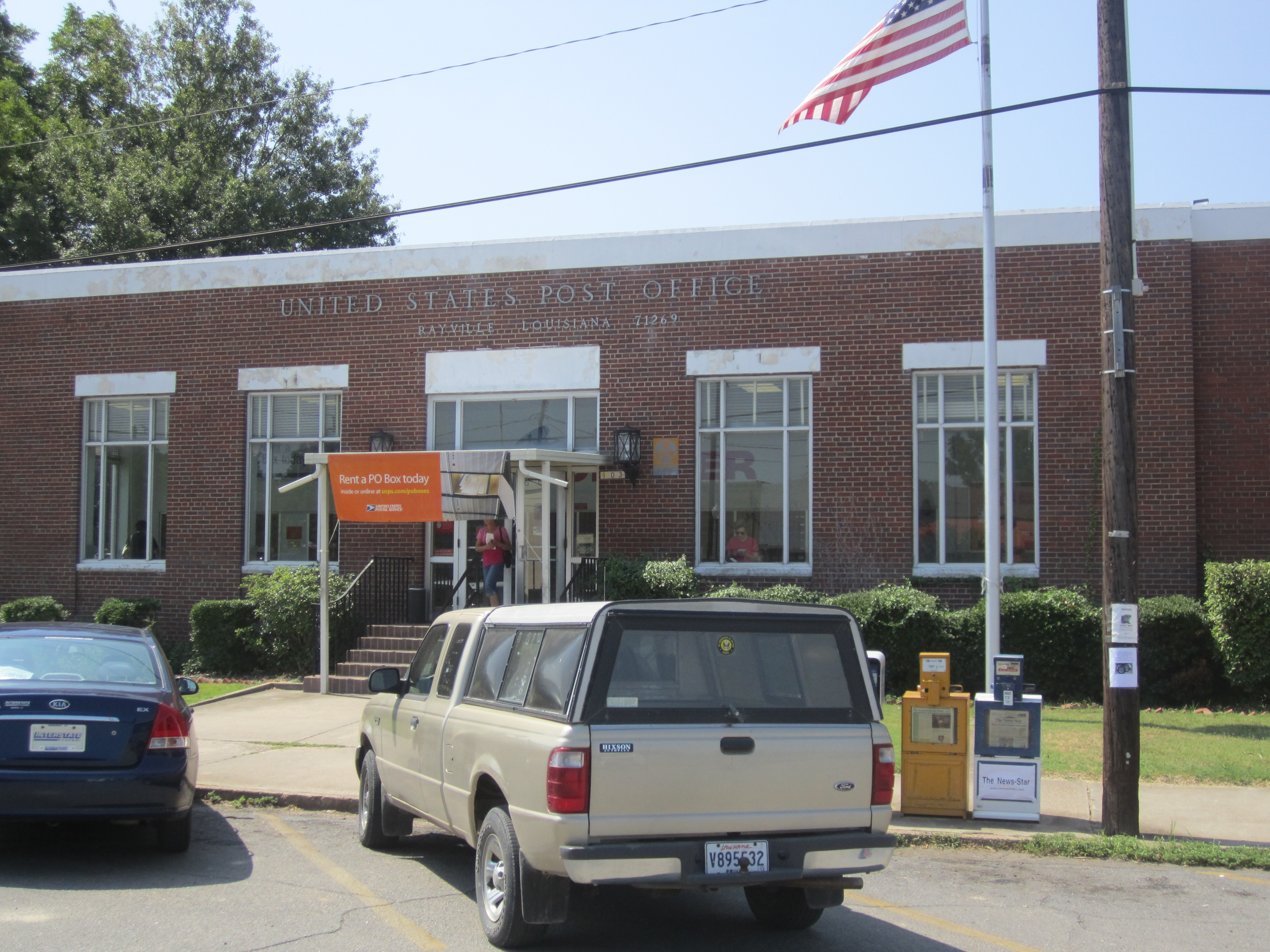
U.S. Post Office in Rayville

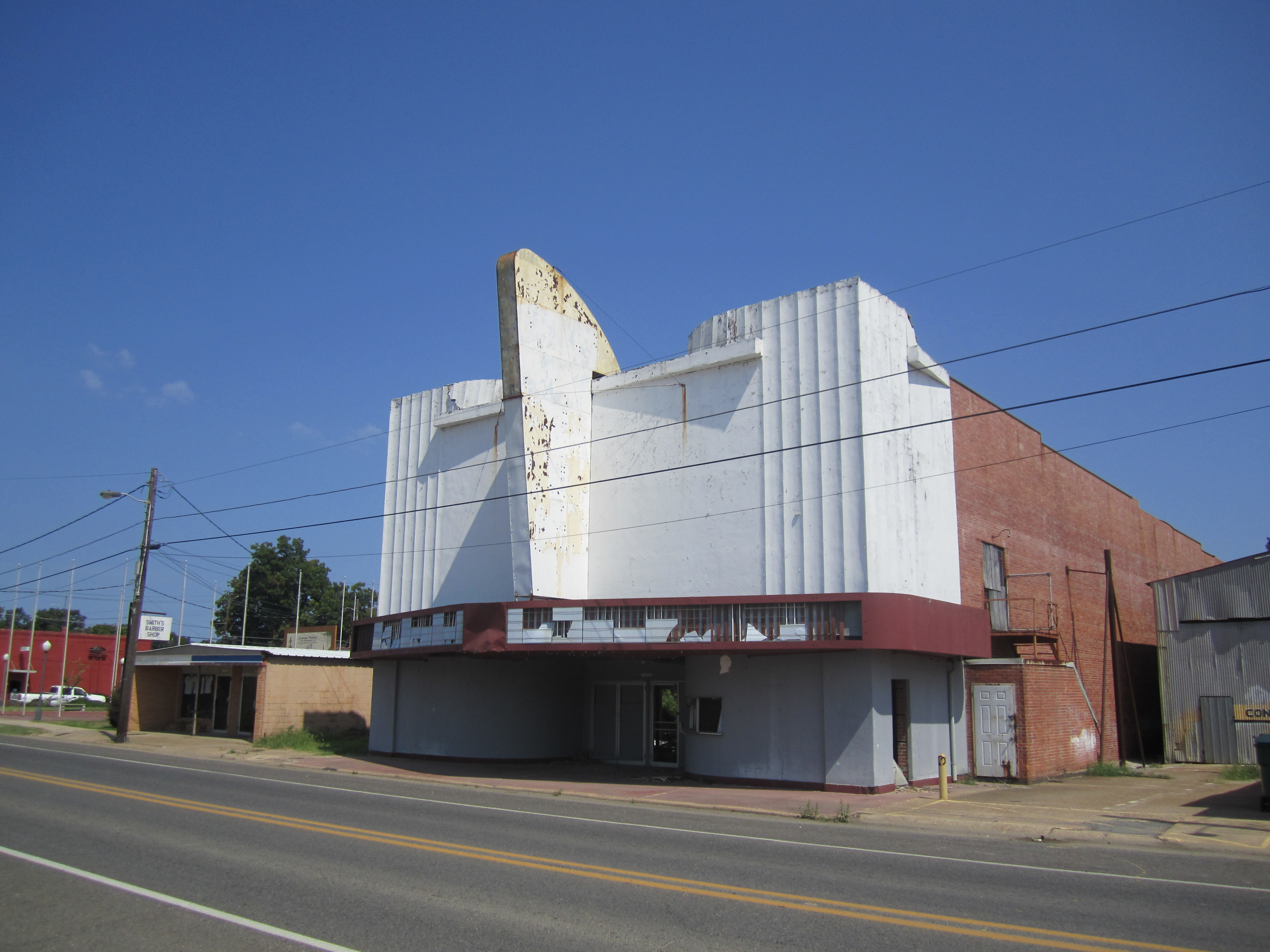
Abandoned Joy Theater in Rayville

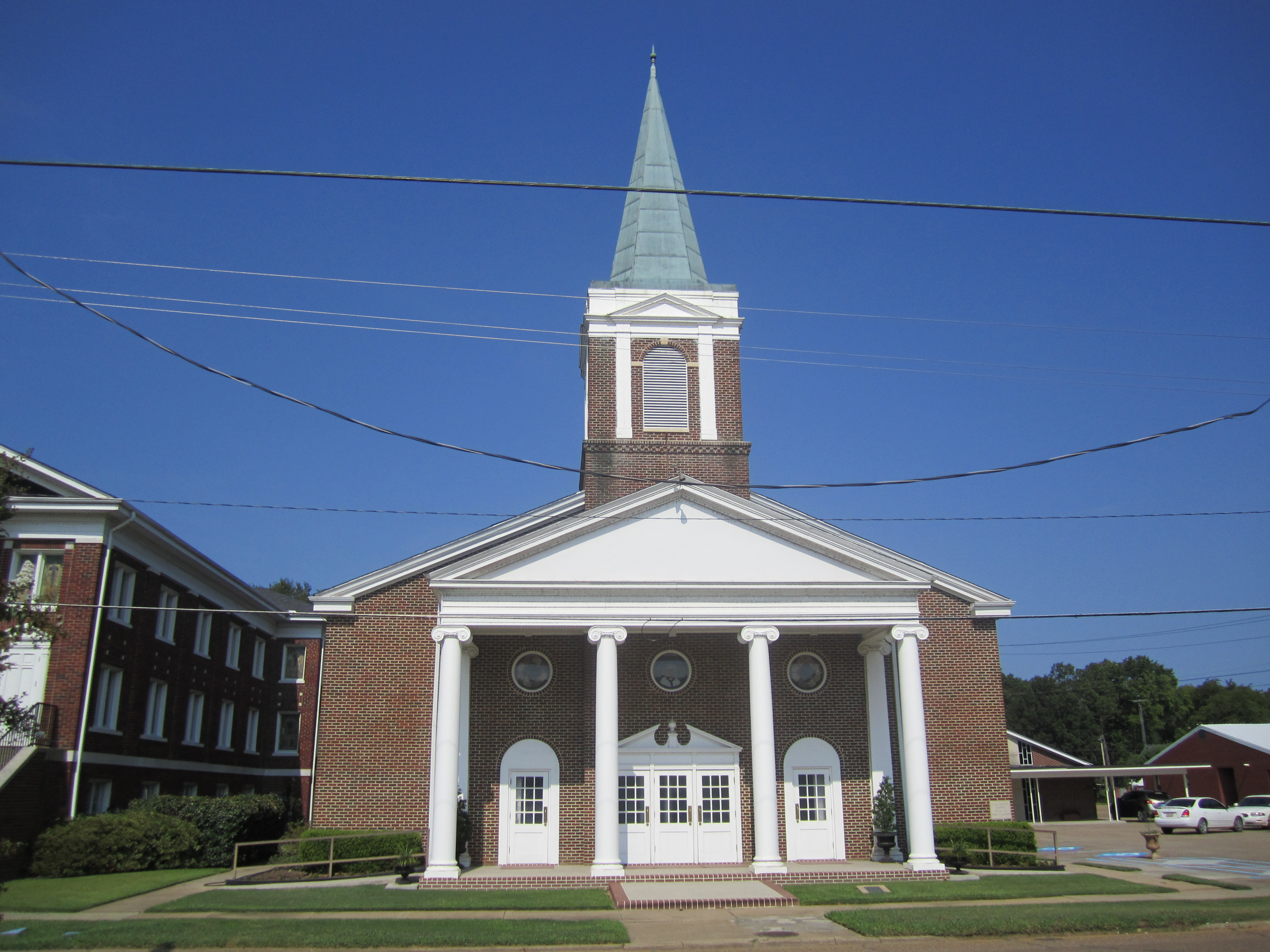
First Baptist Church of Rayville

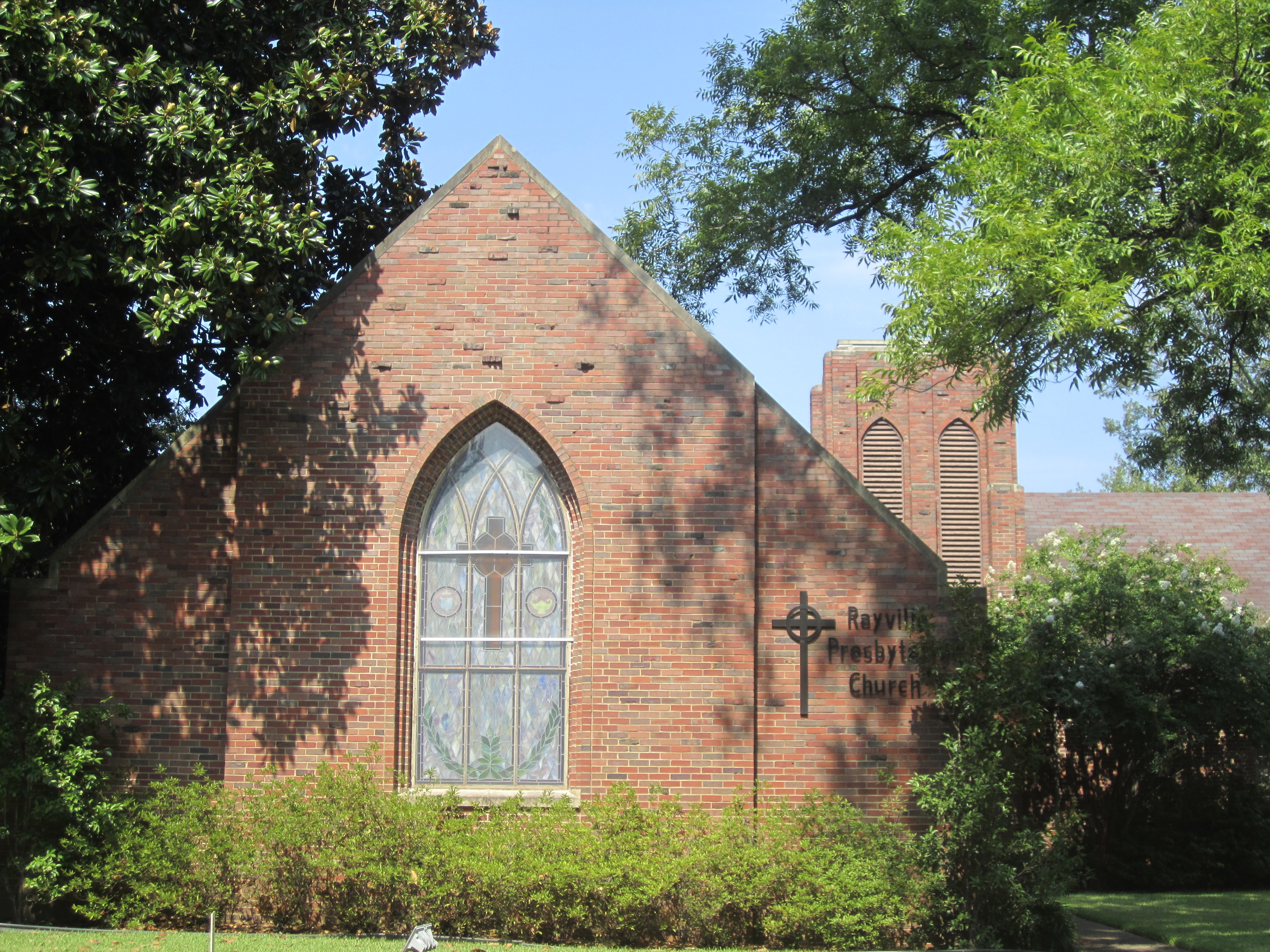
Rayville Presbyterian Church

== See also ==
- Poplar Chapel AME Church
- St. David's Episcopal Church (Rayville, Louisiana)
