= List of state highways in Louisiana (800–849) =

The following is a list of state highways in the U.S. state of Louisiana designated in the 800–849 range.

== Louisiana Highway 800 ==
Louisiana Highway 800
- Location: Webster Parish
- Length: 0.5 mi (800 m)
- Existed: 1955–c. 1957

Louisiana Highway 800 (LA 800) ran 0.5 miles (0.80 km) in a north–south direction from the intersection of two local roads to a junction with LA 163 south of Doyline. The route is now part of LA 527.

The entire route was in Webster Parish.

mi	km	Destinations	Notes
0.0	0.0	Begin state maintenance at junction of two local roads	Southern terminus
0.5	0.80	LA 163	Northern terminus
1.000 mi = 1.609 km; 1.000 km = 0.621 mi

== Louisiana Highway 801 ==
Louisiana Highway 801
- Location: Doyline
- Length: 5.1 mi (8.2 km)
- Existed: 1955–1960

Louisiana Highway 801 (LA 801) ran 5.1 miles (8.2 km) in a north–south direction from LA 166 south of Doyline to LA 163 in Doyline.

The entire highway was in Webster Parish.

Location	mi	km	Destinations	Notes
	0.0	0.0	LA 166	Southern terminus
Doyline	5.1	8.2	LA 163 (Fuller Street)	Northern terminus
1.000 mi = 1.609 km; 1.000 km = 0.621 mi

== Louisiana Highway 802 ==
Louisiana Highway 802
- Location: Webster Parish
- Length: 3.770 mi (6.067 km)
- Existed: 1955–present

Louisiana Highway 802 (LA 802) runs 3.77 miles (6.07 km) in an east–west direction from US 371 south of Cullen to LA 2 northeast of Sarepta.

The entire highway is in Webster Parish.

Location	mi	km	Destinations	Notes
Porterville	0.000	0.000	US 371 – Cullen, Springhill, Sarepta	Western terminus
	3.770	6.067	LA 2 – Sarepta, Shongaloo	Eastern terminus
1.000 mi = 1.609 km; 1.000 km = 0.621 mi

== Louisiana Highway 803 ==
Louisiana Highway 803
- Location: Springhill
- Length: 0.563 mi (906 m)
- Existed: 1955–present

Louisiana Highway 803 (LA 803) currently consists of one road segment with a total length of 0.56 miles (0.90 km) that is located in the Webster Parish city of Springhill. Two of the original three segments, which existed in Springhill and the adjacent town of Cullen, have been deleted from the state highway system.

- LA 803-1 runs 0.563 miles (0.906 km), primarily along South Main Street, from US 371 (South Arkansas Street) to LA 157 at the intersection of Main and Reynolds Streets in Springhill.
- LA 803-2 ran 2.2 miles (3.5 km), primarily along South Main Street and Coyle Avenue, from LA 803-1 at Vine Street in Springhill to US 371 in Cullen. The route was deleted in 1960.
- LA 803-3 ran 1.3 miles (2.1 km) along East Road from LA 803-2 (Coyle Avenue) in Cullen to a local road east of the corporate limits. It was incorporated into the route of LA 803-2 around 1957.

== Louisiana Highway 804 ==
Louisiana Highway 804
- Location: Minden
- Length: 0.5 mi (800 m)
- Existed: 1955–c. 1957

Louisiana Highway 804 (LA 804) ran 0.5 miles (0.80 km) in an east–west direction from the concurrent US 79/US 80 to a second junction with US 80 in Minden.

The entire highway was in Minden, Webster Parish.

mi	km	Destinations	Notes
0.0	0.0	US 79 / US 80 (Broadway Street)	Western terminus
0.5	0.80	US 80 (East Union Street)	Eastern terminus
1.000 mi = 1.609 km; 1.000 km = 0.621 mi

== Louisiana Highway 805 ==
Louisiana Highway 805
- Location: Athens
- Length: 0.480 mi (772 m)
- Existed: 1955–present

Louisiana Highway 805 (LA 805) runs 0.48 miles (0.77 km) in a north–south direction from the concurrent LA 154/LA 518 to LA 9 in Athens.

The entire highway is in Athens, Claiborne Parish.

mi	km	Destinations	Notes
0.000	0.000	LA 154 / LA 518 (Athens Avenue)	Southern terminus
0.480	0.772	LA 9 – Arcadia, Homer	Northern terminus
1.000 mi = 1.609 km; 1.000 km = 0.621 mi

== Louisiana Highway 806 ==
Louisiana Highway 806
- Location: Claiborne Parish
- Length: 2.971 mi (4.781 km)
- Existed: 1955–present

Louisiana Highway 806 (LA 806) runs 2.97 miles (4.78 km) in a north–south direction along Arizona Road from Robinson Lane to a junction with LA 2 east of Homer. The route's mileposts increase from the northern end contrary to common practice.

The entire route is in Claiborne Parish.

mi	km	Destinations	Notes
2.971	4.781	Begin state maintenance at junction of Arizona Road and Robinson Lane	Southern terminus
0.000	0.000	LA 2 – Homer, Bernice	Northern terminus
1.000 mi = 1.609 km; 1.000 km = 0.621 mi

== Louisiana Highway 807 ==
Louisiana Highway 807
- Location: Haynesville
- Length: 0.234 mi (377 m)
- Existed: 1955–present

Louisiana Highway 807 (LA 807) runs 0.23 miles (0.37 km) in a north–south direction from LA 2 Alt. to a point near Holly Circle in Haynesville.

The entire highway is in Haynesville, Claiborne Parish.

mi	km	Destinations	Notes
0.000	0.000	LA 2 Alt. (East Sherman Street, El Dorado Highway) – Haynesville, Summerfield	Southern terminus
0.234	0.377	End state maintenance on Highway 807	Northern terminus
1.000 mi = 1.609 km; 1.000 km = 0.621 mi

== Louisiana Highway 808 ==
Louisiana Highway 808
- Location: Haynesville
- Length: 7.589 mi (12.213 km)
- Existed: 1955–present

Louisiana Highway 808 (LA 808) runs 7.59 miles (12.21 km) in a general east–west direction from LA 615 northeast of Shongaloo, Webster Parish to a second junction with LA 615 in Haynesville, Claiborne Parish.

Parish	Location	mi	km	Destinations	Notes
Webster		0.000	0.000	LA 615 – Haynesville, Springville	Western terminus
Claiborne	Millerton	2.469	3.973	LA 521 south – Leton	Northern terminus of LA 521
Claiborne	Haynesville	7.589	12.213	LA 615 – Haynesville, Springville	Eastern terminus
1.000 mi = 1.609 km; 1.000 km = 0.621 mi

== Louisiana Highway 809 ==
Louisiana Highway 809
- Location: Jackson Parish
- Length: 1.35 mi (2.17 km)
- Existed: 1955–2012

Louisiana Highway 809 (LA 809) ran 1.35 miles (2.17 km) in an east–west direction along Siloam Church Road from LA 505 to the Siloam Springs Methodist Church south of Jonesboro.

The entire route was in Jackson Parish.

mi	km	Destinations	Notes
0.00	0.00	LA 505	Western terminus
1.35	2.17	End state maintenance on Siloam Church Road	Eastern terminus
1.000 mi = 1.609 km; 1.000 km = 0.621 mi

== Louisiana Highway 810 ==
Louisiana Highway 810
- Location: Jackson Parish
- Length: 8.320 mi (13.390 km)
- Existed: 1955–present

Louisiana Highway 810 (LA 810) runs 8.31 miles (13.37 km) in an east–west direction from LA 505 east of Jonesboro to LA 34 south of Chatham.

The entire highway is in Jackson Parish.

Location	mi	km	Destinations	Notes
Weston	0.000	0.000	LA 505	Western terminus
	8.320	13.390	LA 34 – Winnfield, Monroe	Eastern terminus
1.000 mi = 1.609 km; 1.000 km = 0.621 mi

== Louisiana Highway 811 ==
Louisiana Highway 811
- Location: Jackson Parish
- Length: 9.544 mi (15.360 km)
- Existed: 1955–present

Louisiana Highway 811 (LA 811) runs 9.54 miles (15.35 km) in a southeast to northwest direction from LA 4 east of Jonesboro to US 167 north of Hodge.

The entire highway is in Jackson Parish.

Location	mi	km	Destinations	Notes
Weston	0.000	0.000	LA 4 – Jonesboro, Chatham	Southern terminus
	5.581	8.982	LA 542 (Beech Springs Road)	
	9.544	15.360	US 167 – Jonesboro, Ruston	Northern terminus
1.000 mi = 1.609 km; 1.000 km = 0.621 mi

== Louisiana Highway 812 ==
Louisiana Highway 812
- Location: Jackson Parish
- Length: 0.28 mi (450 m)
- Existed: 1955–2012

Louisiana Highway 812 (LA 812) ran 0.28 miles (0.45 km) in an east–west direction along Zion Rest Road from LA 811 to the Zion Rest Primitive Baptist Church east of Jonesboro.

The entire route was in Jackson Parish.

mi	km	Destinations	Notes
0.00	0.00	LA 811 (Gladway Road)	Western terminus
0.28	0.45	End state maintenance on Zion Rest Road	Eastern terminus
1.000 mi = 1.609 km; 1.000 km = 0.621 mi

== Louisiana Highway 813 ==
Louisiana Highway 813
- Location: Hodge
- Length: 2.510 mi (4.039 km)
- Existed: 1955–present

Louisiana Highway 813 (LA 813) currently consists of one road segment with a total length of 2.51 miles (4.04 km) that is located in and near the Jackson Parish village of Hodge. Two of the original three segments, which existed in the nearby town of Jonesboro, have been deleted from the state highway system.

- LA 813-1 ran 0.5 miles (0.80 km) along Old Winnfield Road from US 167 to LA 147 at Walker Road in Jonesboro. The route became part of US 167 in 2004.
- LA 813-2 ran 2.0 miles (3.2 km), primarily along Country Road and 3rd Street, from Bear Creek west of Jonesboro to US 167 (Polk Avenue) in town.
- LA 813-3 runs 2.510 miles (4.039 km) along East Pine Street and its extension from US 167 (Main Street) in Hodge to LA 542 (Beech Springs Road) east of town. In 2019, the portion from US 167 to the Hodge city boundary was removed from the state highway system and transferred to local control.

== Louisiana Highway 814 ==
Louisiana Highway 814
- Location: Jackson Parish
- Length: 2.5 mi (4.0 km)
- Existed: 1955–c. 1959

Louisiana Highway 814 (LA 814) ran 2.5 miles (4.0 km) in a northwest to southeast direction from LA 4 to a local road southeast of Chatham.

The entire route was in Jackson Parish.

mi	km	Destinations	Notes
0.0	0.0	LA 4 – Chatham, Columbia	Western terminus
2.5	4.0	End state maintenance at junction of CC Camp Road and May Road	Eastern terminus
1.000 mi = 1.609 km; 1.000 km = 0.621 mi

== Louisiana Highway 815 ==
Louisiana Highway 815
- Location: Lincoln Parish
- Length: 3.738 mi (6.016 km)
- Existed: 1955–present

Louisiana Highway 815 (LA 815) runs 3.74 miles (6.02 km) in an east–west direction from LA 147 to LA 507 southeast of Simboro.

The entire highway is in Lincoln Parish.

Location	mi	km	Destinations	Notes
Oak Grove	0.000	0.000	LA 147 – Arcadia, Hodge	Western terminus
	3.738	6.016	LA 507	Eastern terminus
1.000 mi = 1.609 km; 1.000 km = 0.621 mi

== Louisiana Highway 816 ==
Louisiana Highway 816
- Location: Lincoln Parish
- Length: 3.2 mi (5.1 km)
- Existed: 1955–1961

Louisiana Highway 816 (LA 816) ran 3.2 miles (5.1 km) in a northwest to southeast direction from LA 563 south of Simsboro to a local road southwest of Grambling.

The entire route was in Lincoln Parish.

mi	km	Destinations	Notes
0.0	0.0	LA 563	Western terminus
1.8	2.9	LA 3005	Western terminus of LA 3005
3.2	5.1	End state maintenance at junction of Mondy Road and Madden Road	Eastern terminus
1.000 mi = 1.609 km; 1.000 km = 0.621 mi

== Louisiana Highway 817 ==
Louisiana Highway 817
- Location: Simsboro
- Length: 0.096 mi (154 m)
- Existed: 1955–present

Louisiana Highway 817 (LA 817) currently consists of one road segment with a total length of 0.10 miles (0.16 km) that is located in the Lincoln Parish village of Simsboro. Two of the original three segments have been deleted from the state highway system.

- LA 817-1 ran 0.5 miles (0.80 km) along Martha Street, Braswell Lane, and Walnut Creek Road from the junction of US 80 and LA 507 to Cranford Street. The route is now mostly part of LA 507, which was extended northward to connect with I-20.
- LA 817-2 ran 0.35 miles (0.56 km) along Tiger Drive and Rose Street in a loop off of US 80 around the perimeter of Simsboro High School. The route was deleted in 2008.
- LA 817-3 runs 0.096 miles (0.154 km) along 2nd Street from LA 507 (Martha Street) to Tiger Drive opposite Simsboro High School.

== Louisiana Highway 818 ==
Louisiana Highway 818
- Location: Clay–Ruston
- Length: 8.724 mi (14.040 km)
- Existed: 1955–present

Louisiana Highway 818 (LA 818) runs 8.72 miles (14.03 km) in a north–south direction from the junction of US 167 and LA 148 at Clay, Jackson Parish to LA 150 in Ruston, Lincoln Parish.

A spur described in the official route description became LA 3012.

Parish	Location	mi	km	Destinations	Notes
Jackson	Clay	0.000	0.000	US 167 (Clay-Ansley Highway) – Ruston, Jonesboro LA 148 east – Vernon	Southern terminus of LA 818; western terminus of LA 148
Lincoln		5.747	9.249	LA 3061 east	Western terminus of LA 3061
Lincoln	Ruston	6.530	10.509	US 80 east (West California Avenue) – Ruston	South end of US 80 concurrency
Lincoln	Ruston	6.660	10.718	US 80 west (West California Avenue) – Simsboro	North end of US 80 concurrency; location also known as Barnet Springs
Lincoln	Ruston	7.943	12.783	LA 3012 east (West Barnett Springs Avenue)	Western terminus of LA 3012
Lincoln	Ruston	8.724	14.040	LA 150	Northern terminus
1.000 mi = 1.609 km; 1.000 km = 0.621 mi: Concurrency terminus

== Louisiana Highway 819 ==
Louisiana Highway 819
- Location: Choudrant
- Length: 0.583 mi (938 m)
- Existed: 1955–present

Louisiana Highway 819 (LA 819) consists of five road segments with a total length of 0.58 miles (0.93 km) that are located in the Lincoln Parish village of Choudrant.

- LA 819-1 runs 0.272 miles (0.438 km) along Oak Street from LA 819-5 (North Depot Street) to a dead end north of US 80.
- LA 819-2 runs 0.108 miles (0.174 km) along Pecan Street from LA 819-3 (Green Street) to US 80.
- LA 819-3 runs 0.064 miles (0.103 km) along Green Street from LA 819-2 (Pecan Street) to LA 819-1 (Oak Street).
- LA 819-4 runs 0.072 miles (0.116 km) along Allen Street from LA 819-1 (Oak Street) to LA 145 (Elm Street).
- LA 819-5 runs 0.067 miles (0.108 km) along North Depot Street from LA 819-1 (Oak Street) to LA 145 (Elm Street).

== Louisiana Highway 820 ==
Louisiana Highway 820
- Location: Choudrant–Cedarton
- Length: 6.724 mi (10.821 km)
- Existed: 1955–present

Louisiana Highway 820 (LA 820) runs 6.72 miles (10.81 km) in a north–south direction from LA 145 in Choudrant to the concurrent LA 33/LA 822 at Cedarton.

The entire highway is in Lincoln Parish.

Location	mi	km	Destinations	Notes
Choudrant	0.000	0.000	LA 145 – Choudrant, Sibley	Southern terminus
Douglas	3.093– 3.116	4.978– 5.015	LA 821 – Sibley, Ruston	
Cedarton	6.724	10.821	LA 33 / LA 822 – Ruston, Farmerville	Northern terminus
1.000 mi = 1.609 km; 1.000 km = 0.621 mi

== Louisiana Highway 821 ==
Louisiana Highway 821
- Location: Lincoln Parish
- Length: 8.186 mi (13.174 km)
- Existed: 1955–present

Louisiana Highway 821 (LA 821) runs 8.19 miles (13.18 km) in an east–west direction from LA 33 north of Ruston to LA 145 in Sibley.

The entire highway is in Lincoln Parish.

Location	mi	km	Destinations	Notes
	0.000	0.000	LA 33 – Ruston, Farmerville	Western terminus
Douglas	4.472– 4.512	7.197– 7.261	LA 820 – Choudrant, Cedarton	
Sibley	8.186	13.174	LA 145 – Choudrant, Downsville	Eastern terminus
1.000 mi = 1.609 km; 1.000 km = 0.621 mi

== Louisiana Highway 822 ==
Louisiana Highway 822
- Location: Lincoln Parish
- Length: 21.971 mi (35.359 km)
- Existed: 1955–present

Louisiana Highway 822 (LA 822) runs 21.97 miles (35.36 km) in a general east–west direction from LA 146 northwest of Vienna to LA 145 in Downsville.

The entire highway is in Lincoln Parish.

Location	mi	km	Destinations	Notes
	0.000	0.000	LA 146 – Vienna, Homer	Western terminus
	4.469– 4.489	7.192– 7.224	US 63 / US 167 south – Ruston	West end of US 63/US 167 concurrency
Unionville	5.489– 5.507	8.834– 8.863	US 63 / US 167 north – Dubach	East end of US 63/US 167 concurrency
	12.532	20.168	LA 33 south – Ruston	West end of LA 33 concurrency
Cedarton	14.695	23.649	LA 820 south – Douglas, Choudrant	Northern terminus of LA 820
	15.412	24.803	LA 33 north – Farmerville	East end of LA 33 concurrency
Downsville	21.971	35.359	LA 145 – Downsville, Choudrant	Eastern terminus
1.000 mi = 1.609 km; 1.000 km = 0.621 mi: Concurrency terminus

== Louisiana Highway 823 ==
Louisiana Highway 823
- Location: Lincoln Parish
- Length: 2.388 mi (3.843 km)
- Existed: 1955–present

Louisiana Highway 823 (LA 823) runs 2.39 miles (3.85 km) in an east–west direction from LA 151 to the Lincoln–Union parish line northeast of Dubach.

Parish	Location	mi	km	Destinations	Notes
Lincoln		0.000	0.000	LA 151 – Dubach, Downsville	Western terminus
Lincoln–Union parish line		2.388	3.843	End state maintenance at east end of Bayou D'Arbonne bridge	Eastern terminus
1.000 mi = 1.609 km; 1.000 km = 0.621 mi

== Louisiana Highway 824 ==
Louisiana Highway 824
- Location: Dubach
- Length: 0.377 mi (607 m)
- Existed: 1955–present

Louisiana Highway 824 (LA 824) consists of three road segments with a total length of 0.38 miles (0.61 km) that are located in the Lincoln Parish town of Dubach.

- LA 824-1 runs 0.236 miles (0.380 km) along Main Street from LA 151 (Annie Lee Street) to LA 824-2 (Wynn Street).
- LA 824-2 runs 0.071 miles (0.114 km) along Wynn Street from the concurrent US 63/US 167 (McMullen Street) to LA 824-1 (Main Street).
- LA 824-3 runs 0.070 miles (0.113 km) along East Hico Street from the junction of US 63/US 167 (McMullin Street) and LA 151 (Hico Street) to LA 824-1 (Main Street).

== Louisiana Highway 825 ==
Louisiana Highway 825
- Location: Union Parish
- Length: 7.1 mi (11.4 km)
- Existed: 1955–1967

Louisiana Highway 825 (LA 825) ran 7.1 miles (11.4 km) in a north–south direction from LA 15 in Spearsville to the Arkansas state line east of Junction City.

The route had a spur that ran from LA 15 and LA 825 eastward 0.11 miles (0.18 km) to the Spearsville school.

The entire highway was in Union Parish.

Location	mi	km	Destinations	Notes
Spearsville	0.0	0.0	LA 15 – Lillie, Farmerville	Southern terminus
Spearsville	0.1	0.16	LA 15 / LA 825 Spur – Lillie, Farmerville	Western terminus of LA 825 Spur
	7.1	11.4	End state maintenance at Arkansas state line	Northern terminus
1.000 mi = 1.609 km; 1.000 km = 0.621 mi

== Louisiana Highway 826 ==
Louisiana Highway 826
- Location: Union Parish
- Length: 2.106 mi (3.389 km)
- Existed: 1955–present

Louisiana Highway 826 (LA 826) runs 2.11 miles (3.40 km) in an east–west direction from LA 33 to the junction of two local roads north of Marion.

The entire highway is in Union Parish.

Location	mi	km	Destinations	Notes
Sadie	0.000	0.000	LA 33 – Marion, Huttig	Western terminus
Litroe	2.106	3.389	End state maintenance at Huttig Road	Eastern terminus
1.000 mi = 1.609 km; 1.000 km = 0.621 mi

== Louisiana Highway 827 ==
Louisiana Highway 827
- Location: Marion–Dean
- Length: 5.516 mi (8.877 km)
- Existed: 1955–present

Louisiana Highway 827 (LA 827) runs 5.52 miles (8.88 km) in an east–west direction from LA 143 in Marion to the junction of two local roads at Dean.

The entire highway is in Union Parish.

Location	mi	km	Destinations	Notes
Marion	0.000	0.000	LA 143 (Main Street) – Farmerville, Sterlington	Western terminus
Dean	5.516	8.877	End state maintenance at junction of Dean Church Road and Dean Haile Road	Eastern terminus
1.000 mi = 1.609 km; 1.000 km = 0.621 mi

== Louisiana Highway 828 ==
Louisiana Highway 828
- Location: Farmerville
- Length: 7.9 mi (12.7 km)
- Existed: 1955–present

Louisiana Highway 828 (LA 828) runs 7.9 miles (12.7 km) in an east–west direction from the Farmerville corporate limits to a junction with LA 2 east of Farmerville.

The route formerly extended west into Farmerville to a junction with LA 33, but this mileage was transferred to local control in 2019 as part of the La DOTD's Road Transfer Program.

The entire highway is in Union Parish.

Location	mi	km	Destinations	Notes
Farmerville	0.0	0.0	Begin state maintenance at corporate limits	Western terminus
	7.9	12.7	LA 2 – Farmerville, Sterlington	Eastern terminus
1.000 mi = 1.609 km; 1.000 km = 0.621 mi

== Louisiana Highway 829 ==
Louisiana Highway 829
- Location: Morehouse Parish
- Length: 4.1 mi (6.6 km)
- Existed: 1955–1961

Louisiana Highway 829 (LA 829) ran 4.1 miles (6.6 km) in an east–west direction from a local road west of Humphreys to a junction with LA 142 northwest of Beekman.

The entire route was in Morehouse Parish.

mi	km	Destinations	Notes
0.0	0.0	Begin state maintenance at Missouri Pacific Railroad crossing	Western terminus
4.1	6.6	LA 142 – Crossett, Bastrop	Eastern terminus
1.000 mi = 1.609 km; 1.000 km = 0.621 mi

== Louisiana Highway 830 ==
Louisiana Highway 830
- Location: Bastrop
- Length: 13.702 mi (22.051 km)
- Existed: 1955–present

Louisiana Highway 830 (LA 830) consists of six road segments with a total length of 13.70 miles (22.05 km) that are located in the Morehouse Parish city of Bastrop. One of the original five routes was deleted soon after the 1955 renumbering, and two more have since been added.

- LA 830-1 runs 2.821 miles (4.540 km), primarily along Van Avenue and Pleasant Drive, from US 425 (North Washington Street) to LA 592 (Cave Off Road).
- LA 830-2 runs 2.238 miles (3.602 km) along Shelton Road from US 425 (Crossett Road) to Crestwood Drive.
- LA 830-3 runs 3.581 miles (5.763 km) along Cherry Ridge Road and Peach Orchard Road from US 425 (North Washington Street, Crossett Road) to the concurrent US 165/US 425/LA 2 (Mer Rouge Road).
- LA 830-4 runs 2.091 miles (3.365 km) along Cooper Lake Road from US 165/US 425/LA 2 (East Madison Avenue) to LA 830-3 (Cherry Ridge Road).
- LA 830-5 originally ran 0.8 miles (1.3 km) along Pruett Street and West Cypress Avenue from US 165/LA 2 (West Madison Avenue) to LA 139 (North Washington Street). The route was deleted around 1957.
- LA 830-5 currently runs 1.436 miles (2.311 km) along Elm Street from LA 593 (Collinston Road) to US 165/US 425/LA 2 (East Madison Avenue, East Jefferson Avenue). The route was added in 1970.
- LA 830-6 runs 1.535 miles (2.470 km) along McCreight Street from US 165/US 425/LA 2 (East Madison Avenue) to US 425 (Crossett Road). The route was added in 1970.

== Louisiana Highway 831 ==
Louisiana Highway 831
- Location: Morehouse Parish
- Length: 3.1 mi (5.0 km)
- Existed: 1955–c. 1957

Louisiana Highway 831 (LA 831) ran 3.1 miles (5.0 km) in a general east–west direction from the junction of LA 139 and LA 554 west of Collinston to LA 138 southwest of Collinston.

The entire route was in Morehouse Parish.

mi	km	Destinations	Notes
0.0	0.0	LA 139 – Bastrop, Monroe LA 554 west – Perryville	Western terminus of LA 831; eastern terminus of LA 554
3.1	5.0	LA 138 – Collinston, Monroe	Eastern terminus
1.000 mi = 1.609 km; 1.000 km = 0.621 mi

== Louisiana Highway 832 ==
Louisiana Highway 832
- Location: Morehouse Parish
- Length: 2.9 mi (4.7 km)
- Existed: 1955–1961

Louisiana Highway 832 (LA 832) ran 2.9 miles (4.7 km) in an east–west direction from US 165 to LA 599 south of Bonita.

The entire route was in Morehouse Parish.

mi	km	Destinations	Notes
0.0	0.0	US 165 – Bonita, Bastrop	Western terminus
2.9	4.7	LA 599	Eastern terminus
1.000 mi = 1.609 km; 1.000 km = 0.621 mi

== Louisiana Highway 833 ==
Louisiana Highway 833
- Location: Morehouse Parish
- Length: 4.910 mi (7.902 km)
- Existed: 1955–present

Louisiana Highway 833 (LA 833) runs 4.91 miles (7.90 km) in a southwest to northeast direction along Jones Cutoff Road from LA 140 west of Bonita to US 165 in Jones.

The entire highway is in Morehouse Parish.

Location	mi	km	Destinations	Notes
	0.000	0.000	LA 140 (Old Bonita Road) – Bonita, Bastrop	Southern terminus
Jones	4.910	7.902	US 165 (Wilmot Highway) – Wilmot, Mer Rouge	Northern terminus
1.000 mi = 1.609 km; 1.000 km = 0.621 mi

== Louisiana Highway 834 ==
Louisiana Highway 834
- Location: Morehouse Parish
- Length: 9.626 mi (15.492 km)
- Existed: 1955–present

Louisiana Highway 834 (LA 834) runs 9.63 miles (15.50 km) in an east–west direction, primarily along Hopkins Hill Road, from LA 591 west of Jones to the junction of US 165 and LA 835 in Jones.

The route initially heads due east from LA 591. After 2.7 miles (4.3 km), it begins a winding path that soon follows the north side of Bayou Bartholomew. Near the end of its route, LA 834 crosses the bayou and turns to the southeast toward the community of Jones. Here, the highway turns sharply to the east, immediately crossing the Union Pacific Railroad (UP) tracks at grade and intersecting US 165. The road continues eastward across US 165 as LA 835 toward Kilbourne. LA 834 is an undivided two-lane highway for its entire length.

The entire highway is in Morehouse Parish.

Location	mi	km	Destinations	Notes
	0.000	0.000	LA 591 (Old Berlin Road)	Western terminus
Jones	9.626	15.492	US 165 (Wilmot Highway) – Wilmot, Mer Rouge; LA 835 (Kilbourne Highway) – Kilbourne	Eastern terminus of LA 834; western terminus of LA 835
1.000 mi = 1.609 km; 1.000 km = 0.621 mi

== Louisiana Highway 835 ==
Louisiana Highway 835
- Location: Morehouse Parish
- Length: 12.094 mi (19.463 km)
- Existed: 1955–present

Louisiana Highway 835 (LA 835) runs 12.09 miles (19.46 km) in an east–west direction from the junction of US 165 and LA 834 in Jones, Morehouse Parish to LA 585 southwest of Kilbourne, West Carroll Parish.

Parish	Location	mi	km	Destinations	Notes
Morehouse	Jones	0.000	0.000	US 165 (Wilmot Highway) – Wilmot, Mer Rouge; LA 834 (Jones-165 Cross Over)	Western terminus of LA 835; eastern terminus of LA 834
West Carroll		12.094	19.463	LA 585 – Kilbourne	Eastern terminus
1.000 mi = 1.609 km; 1.000 km = 0.621 mi

== Louisiana Highway 836 ==
Louisiana Highway 836
- Location: Morehouse Parish
- Length: 3.5 mi (5.6 km)
- Existed: 1955–1962

Louisiana Highway 836 (LA 836) ran 3.5 miles (5.6 km) in a northwest to southeast direction from US 165 north of Jones to LA 835 east of Jones.

The entire highway was in Morehouse Parish.

Location	mi	km	Destinations	Notes
McGinty Spur	0.0	0.0	US 165 – Wilmot, Bonita	Western terminus
	3.5	5.6	LA 835	Eastern terminus
1.000 mi = 1.609 km; 1.000 km = 0.621 mi

== Louisiana Highway 837 ==
Louisiana Highway 837
- Location: Ouachita Parish
- Length: 4.587 mi (7.382 km)
- Existed: 1955–present

Louisiana Highway 837 (LA 837) runs 4.59 miles (7.39 km) in a general southeast to northwest direction from LA 151 at Carlton to a second junction with LA 151 at Pleasant Valley.

The entire highway is in Ouachita Parish.

Location	mi	km	Destinations	Notes
Carlton	0.000	0.000	LA 151 – Calhoun, Pleasant Valley, Downsville	Southern terminus
Pleasant Valley	4.569– 4.587	7.353– 7.382	LA 151 – Calhoun, Downsville	Northern terminus
1.000 mi = 1.609 km; 1.000 km = 0.621 mi

== Louisiana Highway 838 ==
Louisiana Highway 838
- Location: Ouachita Parish
- Length: 9.170 mi (14.758 km)
- Existed: 1955–present

Louisiana Highway 838 (LA 838) runs 9.17 miles (14.76 km) in an east–west direction along New Natchitoches Road from LA 546 northeast of Cadeville to LA 617 south of West Monroe.

The route heads northeast from LA 546 and parallels it for several miles. It then turns east as it nears the Kansas City Southern Railway (KCS) tracks. Near the end of its route, LA 838 intersects LA 3033 (Washington Street), after which it proceeds due east a short distance to an intersection with LA 617 (Thomas Road) just outside the corporate limits of West Monroe. LA 838 is an undivided two-lane highway for its entire length.

The entire route is in Ouachita Parish.

mi	km	Destinations	Notes
0.000	0.000	LA 546 – Cheniere, Eros	Western terminus
7.080	11.394	PR 55 (Well Road) to I-20	
8.168	13.145	LA 3033 (Washington Street)	Northern terminus of LA 3033
9.170	14.758	LA 617 (Thomas Road)	Eastern terminus
1.000 mi = 1.609 km; 1.000 km = 0.621 mi

== Louisiana Highway 839 ==
Louisiana Highway 839
- Location: Ouachita Parish
- Length: 3.6 mi (5.8 km)
- Existed: 1955–c. 1957

Louisiana Highway 839 (LA 839) ran 3.6 miles (5.8 km) in a north–south direction from a local road at the Caldwell–Ouachita parish line to a junction with LA 557 at Luna.

Parish	Location	mi	km	Destinations	Notes
Caldwell–Ouachita parish line		0.0	0.0	Begin state maintenance on Pine Bluff Road	Southern terminus
Ouachita	Luna	3.6	5.8	LA 557	Northern terminus
1.000 mi = 1.609 km; 1.000 km = 0.621 mi

== Louisiana Highway 840 ==
Louisiana Highway 840
- Location: Monroe–West Monroe
- Length: 5.184 mi (8.343 km)
- Existed: 1955–present

Louisiana Highway 840 (LA 840) currently consists of two road segments with a total length of 5.18 miles (8.34 km) that are located in and near the adjacent Ouachita Parish cities of Monroe and West Monroe. Four of the original six segments have been deleted from the state highway system.

- LA 840-1 runs 1.214 miles (1.954 km) along Smith Street from LA 3033 (Washington Street) to LA 34 (Jonesboro Road) south of West Monroe.
- LA 840-2 ran 1.1 miles (1.8 km) along Reagan Street, Montgomery Avenue, and Coleman Avenue from LA 34 (Jonesboro Road) to Phillips Street in West Monroe. The route was deleted around 1957.
- LA 840-3 ran 1.8 miles (2.9 km) along North 7th Street from LA 34 (Natchitoches Street) to the concurrent US 80/LA 15 (Dixie Overland Highway) in West Monroe. The route was deleted in 1962.
- LA 840-4 ran 0.7 miles (1.1 km) along South Grand Street from US 165 (Jackson Street) to Vernon Street in Monroe. The route was deleted around 1957.
- LA 840-5 ran 0.7 miles (1.1 km) along DeSiard Street from South 26th Street to the junction of US 80 and US 165 at the intersection of Louisville Avenue, Powell Avenue, and Island Road in Monroe. The route was deleted around 1957.
- LA 840-6 runs 3.970 miles (6.389 km) along North 18th Street, Forsythe Avenue, and Forsythe Bypass from the concurrent US 80/US 165 Bus. (Louisville Avenue) to mainline US 165 (Sterlington Road) in Monroe.

== Louisiana Highway 841 ==
Louisiana Highway 841
- Location: Ouachita Parish
- Length: 9.430 mi (15.176 km)
- Existed: 1955–present

Louisiana Highway 841 (LA 841) runs 9.43 miles (15.18 km) in a north–south direction along Prairie Road from US 165 to LA 15 south of Monroe.

The entire highway is in Ouachita Parish.

Location	mi	km	Destinations	Notes
Fondale	0.000– 0.021	0.000– 0.034	US 165 – Monroe, Columbia	Southern terminus
Pine Grove	9.430	15.176	LA 15 (Winnsboro Road) – Monroe, Winnsboro	Northern terminus
1.000 mi = 1.609 km; 1.000 km = 0.621 mi

== Louisiana Highway 842 ==
Louisiana Highway 842
- Location: Caldwell Parish
- Length: 2.3 mi (3.7 km)
- Existed: 1955–1970

Louisiana Highway 842 (LA 842) ran 2.3 miles (3.7 km) in a north–south direction from US 165 south of Kelly to LA 506 in Kelly.

The entire highway was in Caldwell Parish.

Location	mi	km	Destinations	Notes
Spaulding	0.0	0.0	US 165 – Columbia, Alexandria	Southern terminus
	1.3	2.1	LA 843	Northern terminus of LA 843
Kelly	2.3	3.7	LA 506	Northern terminus
1.000 mi = 1.609 km; 1.000 km = 0.621 mi

== Louisiana Highway 843 ==
Louisiana Highway 843
- Location: Caldwell Parish
- Length: 5.983 mi (9.629 km)
- Existed: 1955–present

Louisiana Highway 843 (LA 843) runs 5.98 miles (9.62 km) in a north–south direction from LA 124 east of Olla, LaSalle Parish to LA 506 in Kelly, Caldwell Parish. The route's mileposts increase from the northern end contrary to common practice.

The route from its intersection with US-165 to its Southern terminus at LA-124 is set to be deleted (transferred to local government) under Louisiana DOTD's "right-sizing" program.

Parish	Location	mi	km	Destinations	Notes
LaSalle		5.983	9.629	LA 124 – Olla, Rosefield	Southern terminus
Caldwell		1.329– 1.312	2.139– 2.111	US 165 – Columbia, Alexandria	
Caldwell	Kelly	0.000	0.000	LA 506	Northern terminus
1.000 mi = 1.609 km; 1.000 km = 0.621 mi

== Louisiana Highway 844 ==
Louisiana Highway 844
- Location: Clarks
- Length: 3.079 mi (4.955 km)
- Existed: 1955–present

Louisiana Highway 844 (LA 844) runs 3.08 miles (4.96 km) in a southwest to northeast direction from US 165 south of Clarks to a second junction with US 165 between Clarks and Grayson.

The entire highway is in Caldwell Parish.

Location	mi	km	Destinations	Notes
	0.000– 0.017	0.000– 0.027	US 165 – Columbia, Alexandria	Southern terminus
Clarks	1.836	2.955	LA 547	Eastern terminus of LA 547
	3.066– 3.079	4.934– 4.955	US 165 – Columbia, Alexandria	Northern terminus
1.000 mi = 1.609 km; 1.000 km = 0.621 mi

== Louisiana Highway 845 ==
Louisiana Highway 845
- Location: Clarks
- Length: 1.938 mi (3.119 km)
- Existed: 1955–present

Louisiana Highway 845 (LA 845) runs 1.94 miles (3.12 km) in a north–south direction from LA 547 in Clarks to LA 126 west of Grayson.

The entire highway is in Caldwell Parish.

Location	mi	km	Destinations	Notes
Clarks	0.000	0.000	LA 547 (Main Street, 1st Street)	Southern terminus
	1.938	3.119	LA 126 – Grayson, Sikes	Northern terminus
1.000 mi = 1.609 km; 1.000 km = 0.621 mi

== Louisiana Highway 846 ==
Louisiana Highway 846
- Location: Caldwell Parish
- Length: 19.136 mi (30.796 km)
- Existed: 1955–present

Louisiana Highway 846 (LA 846) runs 19.14 miles (30.80 km) in a general north–south direction from a local road northwest of Mount Pleasant to the Caldwell–Ouachita parish line.

Under the Louisiana DOTD's "right-sizing" road transfer program, the first 5.566 miles of the route (from Countrywood Drive to LA-4) is set to be deleted and transferred to the local government.

Under the Louisiana DOTD's road transfer program, Pine Bluff Road from the intersection of LA-557 in Ouachita Parish to the Caldwell-Ouachita Parish line is set to be transferred back to State control. It was previously transferred to Ouachita Parish control under the same program, and has fallen into disrepair.

Parish	Location	mi	km	Destinations	Notes
Caldwell		0.000	0.000	Begin state maintenance at Countrywood Drive	Southwestern terminus
Caldwell	Mount Pleasant	5.566	8.958	LA 4 west – Chatham	West end of LA 4 concurrency
Caldwell		6.766	10.889	LA 4 east – Columbia	East end of LA 4 concurrency
Caldwell–Ouachita parish line		19.136	30.796	End state maintenance at Pine Bluff Road	Northeastern terminus
1.000 mi = 1.609 km; 1.000 km = 0.621 mi: Concurrency terminus

== Louisiana Highway 847 ==
Louisiana Highway 847
- Location: Caldwell Parish
- Length: 5.462 mi (8.790 km)
- Existed: 1955–present

Louisiana Highway 847 (LA 847) runs 5.46 miles (8.79 km) in an east–west direction from US 165 north of Columbia to LA 133 northwest of Hebert.

The entire route is in Caldwell Parish.

mi	km	Destinations	Notes
0.000– 0.016	0.000– 0.026	US 165 – Columbia, Monroe	Western terminus
4.378– 4.471	7.046– 7.195	Bridge over Bayou Lafourche Cutoff	
5.462	8.790	LA 133 – Hebert	Eastern terminus
1.000 mi = 1.609 km; 1.000 km = 0.621 mi

== Louisiana Highway 848 ==
Louisiana Highway 848
- Location: Caldwell Parish
- Length: 4.949 mi (7.965 km)
- Existed: 1955–present

Louisiana Highway 848 (LA 848) runs 4.95 miles (7.97 km) in a north–south direction from a local road southeast of Hebert to a junction with LA 561 in Hebert. The route's mileposts increase from the northern end contrary to common practice.

The entire highway is in Caldwell Parish.

Location	mi	km	Destinations	Notes
	4.949	7.965	Begin state maintenance at Carson Road	Southern terminus
Hebert	0.015– 0.000	0.024– 0.000	LA 561	Northern terminus
1.000 mi = 1.609 km; 1.000 km = 0.621 mi

The entire route is set to be deleted and transferred to local control as part of the Louisiana DOTD's "right-sizing" program.

== Louisiana Highway 849 ==
Louisiana Highway 849
- Location: Caldwell Parish
- Length: 12.791 mi (20.585 km)
- Existed: 1955–present

Louisiana Highway 849 (LA 849) runs 12.79 miles (20.58 km) in a general north–south direction from LA 506 east of Kelly to US 165 south of Columbia.

The entire highway is in Caldwell Parish.

Location	mi	km	Destinations	Notes
	0.000	0.000	LA 506	Southern terminus
	0.777	1.250	LA 850	Southern terminus of LA 850
Holum	3.181	5.119	LA 126 east – Rosefield	South end of LA 126 concurrency
Holum	3.400	5.472	LA 126 west – Grayson	North end of LA 126 concurrency
	4.955	7.974	LA 851	Eastern terminus of LA 851
Columbia Heights	12.791	20.585	US 165 – Columbia, Alexandria	Northern terminus
1.000 mi = 1.609 km; 1.000 km = 0.621 mi: Concurrency terminus

Under the Louisiana DOTD's "right-sizing" program, the Southern end (the first 3.181 miles) of the route is set to be deleted and transferred to local control.
