= Louisiana Highway 33 =

State highway in Louisiana, United States

Louisiana Highway 33

- Route of LA 33 highlighted in red

Route information
- Maintained by Louisiana DOTD
- Length: 44.029 mi (70.858 km)
- Existed: 1955 renumbering–present

Major junctions
- South end: US 80 in Ruston
- I-20 in Ruston; LA 151 in D'Arbonne; LA 2 / LA 15 in Farmerville; LA 143 in Marion
- North end: AR 129 at Arkansas state line north of Marion

Location
- Country: United States
- State: Louisiana
- Parishes: Lincoln, Union

Highway system
- Louisiana State Highway System; Interstate; US; State; Scenic
← LA 32	→ LA 34

Louisiana Highway 33 (LA 33) is a state highway located in northern Louisiana. It runs 44.03 miles (70.86 km) in a southwest to northeast direction from U.S. Highway 80 (US 80) in Ruston to the Arkansas state line north of Marion.

The route begins east of Ruston's downtown area and provides access to one of the city's three interchanges with Interstate 20 (I-20). Midway along its route, LA 33 joins LA 15 across Lake D'Arbonne, a popular recreational spot, and through the adjacent town of Farmerville. North of Marion, the roadway continues as Arkansas Highway 129 toward Huttig, Arkansas.

LA 33 was designated in the 1955 Louisiana Highway renumbering, replacing portions of three routes: State Route 44, State Route 11, and State Route 156. This created a single highway designation connecting the seats of Lincoln and Union parishes to each other and with the Arkansas state line.

== Route description ==
=== Ruston to Farmerville ===
From the south, LA 33 begins at a junction with US 80 (East Georgia Avenue) in Ruston, a city in Lincoln Parish. It heads northeast on Farmerville Highway, an undivided four-lane thoroughfare, and passes through a diamond interchange with I-20 at exit 86. I-20 parallels US 80 throughout the state and connects with the metropolitan areas of Shreveport to the west and Monroe to the east. Gaining a center turning lane, LA 33 proceeds through a growing commercial corridor that extends out of the Ruston city limits.

The surroundings become largely rural near an intersection with LA 821, and LA 33 narrows to an undivided two-lane highway. Shortly afterward is an intersection with LA 3072, a short connector to the nearby town of Vienna. LA 33 curves slightly more to the east and overlaps LA 822 through an area known as Cedarton. About midway along this concurrency is a junction with LA 820, connecting with Choudrant to the south.

LA 33 crosses into Union Parish and immediately intersects LA 151 in the community of D'Arbonne, providing connections to Downsville and Dubach. About five miles (8.0 km) later, LA 33 begins a concurrency with LA 15, and the two routes proceed across Lake D'Arbonne along a narrow embankment. Approaching the opposite shore, the roadway transitions onto the James Peyton Smith Bridge, a low beam bridge that spans an open stretch of the lake.

=== Farmerville to Arkansas line ===
Once on shore, LA 15 and LA 33 enter the town of Farmerville, which is also the parish seat. The highway travels along Main Street and curves due north through the center of town. An intersection with LA 3281 (Park Street), provides access to the nearby Louisiana National Guard Armory. Two blocks later at Water Street, LA 2 turns north to join LA 15 and LA 33 through the business section. LA 33 departs from the concurrency by turning east onto Miller Street. It then curves northeast onto Marion Highway past Farmerville Stadium and out of the town.

LA 33 continues northeast for about 11 miles (18 km) through sparsely populated pine forests before reaching the town of Marion. Here, the highway turns east onto Main Street through the town center then north onto Taylor Street at an intersection with LA 143. LA 33 continues north through rural Union Parish for another 7.5 miles (12.1 km) before reaching the Arkansas state line just north of Sadie. The road continues toward Huttig as Arkansas Highway 129 (AR 129).

=== Route classification and data ===
LA 33 is generally classified by the Louisiana Department of Transportation and Development (La DOTD) as an urban principal arterial in Ruston and as a rural major collector northward. Daily traffic volume in 2013 peaked at 18,600 vehicles in Ruston and 11,600 in Farmerville, tapering down to 1,010 near the Arkansas state line. The posted speed limit is 55 mph (90 km/h) for most of the route but is reduced to 35 mph (55 km/h) in Ruston and 25 mph (40 km/h) in both Farmerville and Marion.

== History ==
In the original Louisiana Highway system in use between 1921 and 1955, LA 33 was part of four different routes: State Route 44 from Ruston to Farmerville; State Route 15 through Farmerville; State Route 11 from Farmerville to Marion; and State Route 156 from Marion to the Arkansas state line. These highways were joined together under the single designation of LA 33 when the Louisiana Department of Highways renumbered the state highway system in 1955. LA 15 remained on the Farmerville segment co-signed with the new LA 33 as it was one of the few pre-1955 routes to retain its identity after the 1955 renumbering.

La 33—From a junction with La-US 80 at or near Ruston to a junction with La 15 at or near Farmerville and from a junction with La 2 at or near Farmerville through or near Marion to the Arkansas State Line.

— 1955 legislative route description

Since the 1955 renumbering, LA 33 has changed very little. Its only realignment occurred in the early 1960s in connection with the Bayou D'Arbonne crossing. In November 1963, the bayou and two other small waterways near Farmerville were impounded to create Bayou D'Arbonne Lake, more commonly known as Lake D'Arbonne. That year, an embankment and bridge were constructed on the concurrent LA 15/LA 33 to cross the new man-made lake. In May 2013, Louisiana Governor Bobby Jindal signed a bill into law renaming the bridge in honor of James Peyton Smith, the state representative from Union and Morehouse parishes from 1964 to 1972. Though the old bayou bridge was demolished, much of the original roadway still exists to the north of the current alignment and is now used as a boat launch. LA 15 was also realigned near its junction with LA 33, which was moved 0.3 miles (0.48 km) to the southwest. The original roadbed of LA 15 here is now partially submerged in the lake waters.

Another improvement affecting LA 33 was the opening of the interchange with I-20 in April 1960. This portion of I-20, extending 7.8 miles (12.6 km) from Ruston to Choudrant, was the first rural segment of interstate highway to be completed in Louisiana. LA 33 was subsequently widened southward from the interchange to handle the increased traffic, which included the replacement of the original two-lane overpass across I-20 with the current five-lane span in 1991. The highway was widened northward from I-20 through the remainder of its distance in Ruston more recently, around 2010.

== Major intersections ==
Parish	Location	mi	km	Destinations	Notes
Lincoln	Ruston	0.000	0.000	US 80 (East Georgia Avenue)	Southern terminus
Lincoln	Ruston	0.572– 0.738	0.921– 1.188	I-20 – Monroe, Shreveport	Exit 86 on I-20
Lincoln		3.333	5.364	LA 821 east	Western terminus of LA 821
Lincoln		4.857	7.817	LA 3072 west – Vienna, Homer	Eastern terminus of LA 3072
Lincoln		7.450	11.990	LA 822 west – Mineral Springs, Dubach	South end of LA 822 concurrency
Lincoln	Cedarton	9.597	15.445	LA 820 south – Douglas, Choudrant	Northern terminus of LA 820
Lincoln		10.314	16.599	LA 822 east	North end of LA 822 concurrency
Union	D'Arbonne	14.003	22.536	LA 151 – Downsville, Dubach	
Union	Farmerville	19.392– 19.438	31.208– 31.282	LA 15 south – West Monroe, Monroe	South end of LA 15 concurrency
Union	Farmerville	20.638– 20.824	33.214– 33.513	James Peyton Smith Bridge over Bayou D'Arbonne Lake (or Lake D'Arbonne)	
Union	Farmerville	21.953	35.330	LA 3281 (Park Street)	Eastern terminus of LA 3281; to Louisiana National Guard Armory
Union	Farmerville	22.059	35.501	LA 2 east (East Water Street) – Sterlington, Bastrop	South end of LA 2 concurrency
Union	Farmerville	22.659	36.466	LA 2 west / LA 15 north (North Main Street) – Bernice, Spearsville	North end of LA 2 and LA 15 concurrencies; to Lake D'Arbonne State Park
Union		32.923	52.984	LA 348	Eastern terminus of LA 348
Union	Marion	35.843	57.684	LA 551 (M.L.K. Jr. Drive)	Southern terminus of LA 551
Union	Marion	36.361	58.517	LA 143 south (Main Street) – Sterlington	Northern terminus of LA 143
Union	Sadie	42.488	68.378	LA 826 east – Litroe	Western terminus of LA 826
Union		44.029	70.858	AR 129 north – Huttig	Northern terminus; continuation in Arkansas
1.000 mi = 1.609 km; 1.000 km = 0.621 mi: Concurrency terminus
