= Monroe metropolitan area, Louisiana =

Greater Monroe
- Metropolitan statistical area
- Monroe, LA metropolitan statistical area
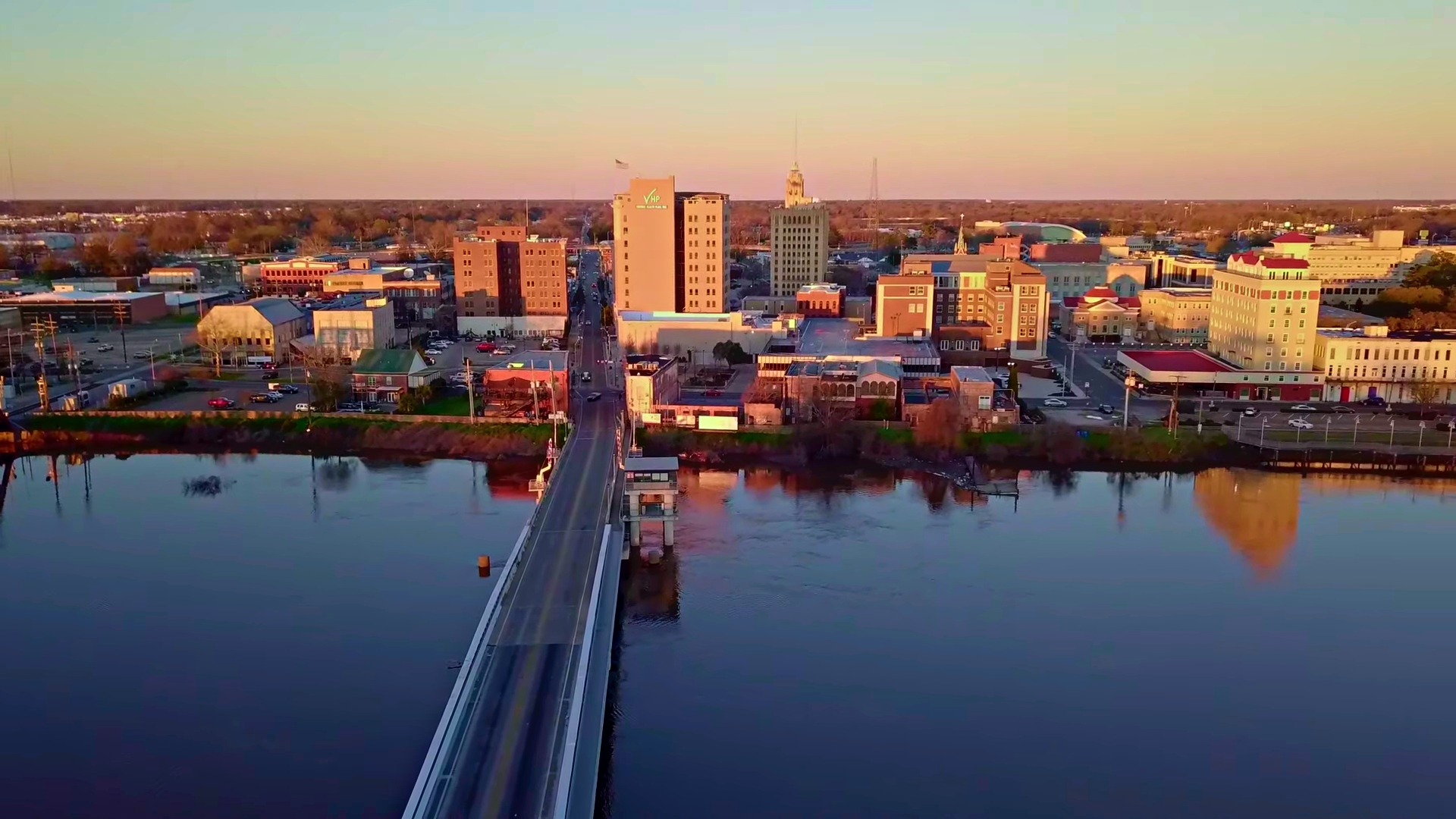
- Downtown Monroe
Interactive Map of Monroe–Ruston, LA CSA
City of Monroe
Monroe, LA MSA
Ruston, LA µSA
- Country: United States
- State: Louisiana
- Principal city: Monroe
- Other cities: West Monroe; Bastrop; Farmerville; Ruston

Population (2020)
  - Total: 207,104
- Time zone: UTC-6 (CST)
  - Summer (DST): UTC-5 (CDT)
- River: Ouachita River

The Monroe metropolitan area, officially the Monroe metropolitan statistical area, is a metropolitan statistical area in Northern Louisiana that covers three parishes—Ouachita, Union, and Morehouse. According to the 2020 census, the MSA had a population of 207,104.

== Parishes ==
- Morehouse
- Ouachita
- Richland
- Union

== Communities ==
=== Cities ===
- Monroe (Principal city)
- West Monroe (Suburb of Monroe)
- Bastrop

=== Towns ===
- Bernice
- Farmerville
- Marion
- Richwood
- Sterlington

=== Villages ===
- Bonita
- Collinston
- Conway
- Downsville
- Junction City
- Lillie
- Mer Rouge
- Oak Ridge
- Spearsville
- Truxno

=== Census-designated places ===
- Brownsville-Bawcomville
- Calhoun
- Claiborne
- Lakeshore
- Swartz

== Demographics ==
As of the census of 2000, there were 170,053 people, 64,073 households, and 44,731 families residing within the MSA. By the publication of the 2020 United States census, its population increased to 207,104. With the publication of the 2020 American Community Survey, its population decreased to an estimated 202,138.

In 2000, the racial and ethnic makeup of Metropolitan Monroe was 65.19% White, 32.87% African American, 0.22% Native American, 0.59% Asian, 0.03% Pacific Islander, 0.45% from other races, and 0.65% from two or more races. Hispanic or Latinos of any race were 1.30% of the population; the 2020 American Community Survey's 5-year census estimates program determined its racial and ethnic makeup was 58% White, 38% Black or African American, 1% Asian, 1% multiracial, and 2% Hispanic or Latino of any race.

At the 2000 census, the median income for a household in the MSA was $30,544, and the median income for a family was $38,120. Males had a median income of $31,055 versus $22,105 for females. The per capita income for the MSA was $15,952; in 2020, its median income increased to $43,212 with 23.5% of its population living at or below the poverty line.

== See also ==
- Louisiana census statistical areas
- List of cities, towns, and villages in Louisiana
- List of census-designated places in Louisiana
