= Banks Springs, Louisiana =

- Census-designated place
- Location in Caldwell Parish and the state of Louisiana.
- Coordinates: 32°04′35″N 92°05′06″W
- Country: United States
- State: Louisiana
- Parish: Caldwell

Area
  - Total: 3.14 sq mi (8.12 km^{2})
  - Land: 3.14 sq mi (8.12 km^{2})
  - Water: 0 sq mi (0.00 km^{2})
- Elevation: 200 ft (61 m)

Population (2020)
  - Total: 1,136
  - Density: 362.4/sq mi (139.91/km^{2})
- Time zone: UTC-6 (CST)
  - Summer (DST): UTC-5 (CST)
- ZIP Codes: 71418
- Area Code: 318
- FIPS code: 22-04230
- GNIS feature ID: 2586664

Banks Springs is an unincorporated community and census-designated place (CDP) in Caldwell Parish, Louisiana, United States. As of the 2020 census it had a population of 1136. It is located near the center of Caldwell Parish 2 miles (3 km) south of Columbia, the parish seat, and 2.5 miles (4.0 km) north of Grayson. The CDP includes the neighborhood of Columbia Heights.

U.S. Route 165 passes through the center of Banks Springs, leading north 34 miles (55 km) to Monroe and southwest 62 miles (100 km) to Alexandria.

The community was home to one of the Rosenwald Schools in the 19th-century.

== Demographics ==
Historical population
Census	Pop.	Note	%±
2010	1,192		—
2020	1,136		−4.7%
U.S. Decennial Census

Banks Springs was first listed as a census designated place in the 2010 U.S. census.

Banks Springs CDP, Louisiana – Racial and ethnic composition Note: the US Census treats Hispanic/Latino as an ethnic category. This table excludes Latinos from the racial categories and assigns them to a separate category. Hispanics/Latinos may be of any race.
Race / Ethnicity (NH = Non-Hispanic)	Pop 2010	Pop 2020	% 2010	% 2020
White alone (NH)	511	485	42.87%	42.69%
Black or African American alone (NH)	629	566	52.77%	49.82%
Native American or Alaska Native alone (NH)	1	1	0.08%	0.09%
Asian alone (NH)	10	4	0.84%	0.35%
Native Hawaiian or Pacific Islander alone (NH)	0	0	0.00%	0.00%
Other race alone (NH)	0	2	0.00%	0.18%
Mixed race or Multiracial (NH)	20	48	1.68%	4.23%
Hispanic or Latino (any race)	21	30	1.76%	2.64%
Total	1,192	1,136	100.00%	100.00%
