= Caldwell Parish, Louisiana =

Parish in Louisiana, United States

- Parish
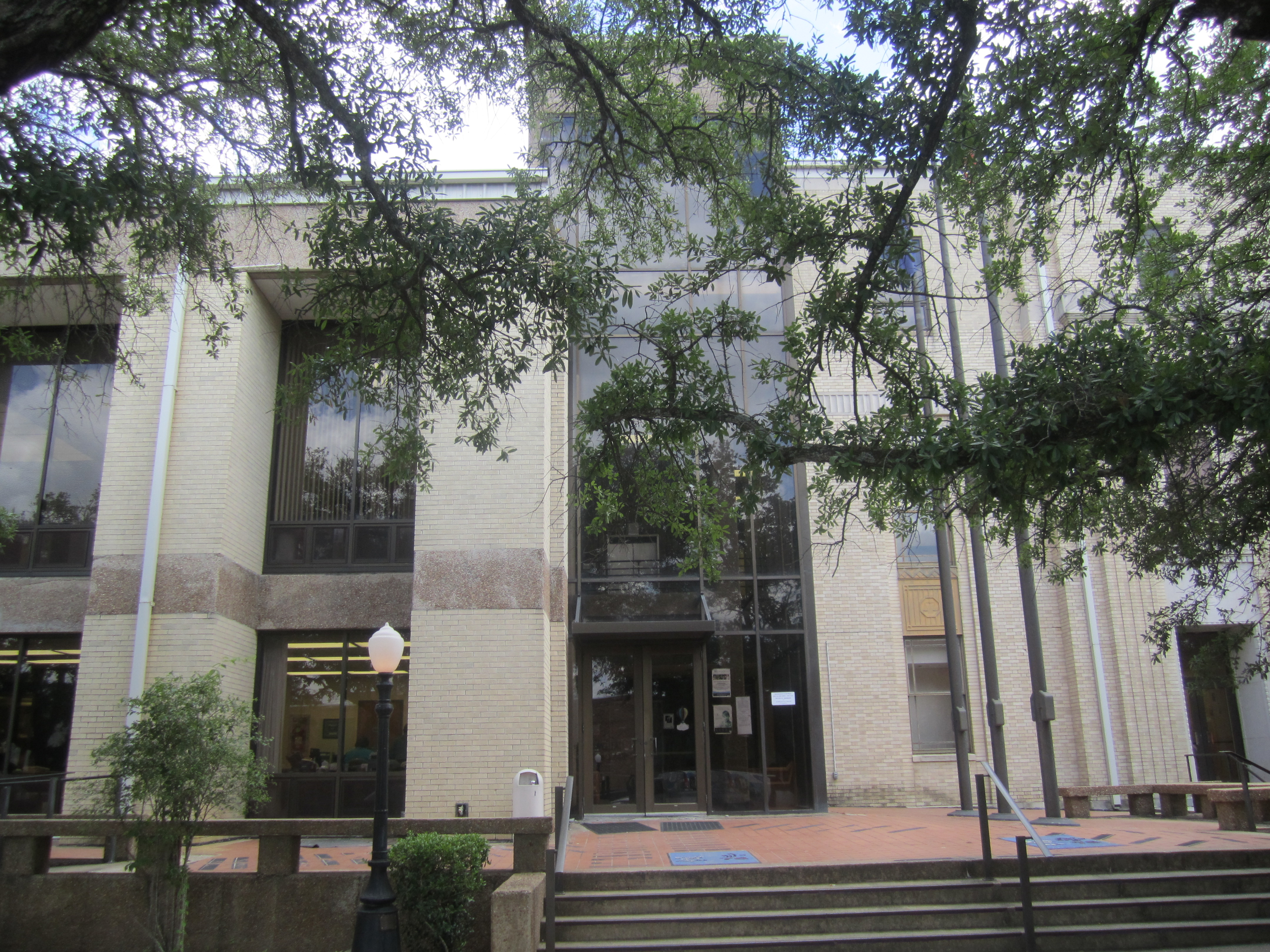
- Caldwell Parish Courthouse in Columbia

- Seal

- Location within the U.S. state of Louisiana
- Coordinates: 32°05′N 92°07′W
- Country: United States
- State: Louisiana
- Founded: 1838
- Named for: Local Caldwell family
- Seat: Columbia
- Largest village: Clarks

Area
  - Total: 541 sq mi (1,400 km^{2})
  - Land: 529 sq mi (1,370 km^{2})
  - Water: 11 sq mi (28 km^{2}) 2.1%

Population (2020)
  - Total: 9,645
  - Estimate (2025): 9,344 ▼
  - Density: 18.2/sq mi (7.04/km^{2})
- Time zone: UTC−6 (Central)
  - Summer (DST): UTC−5 (CDT)
- Congressional district: 5th
- Website: www.caldwellparish.org

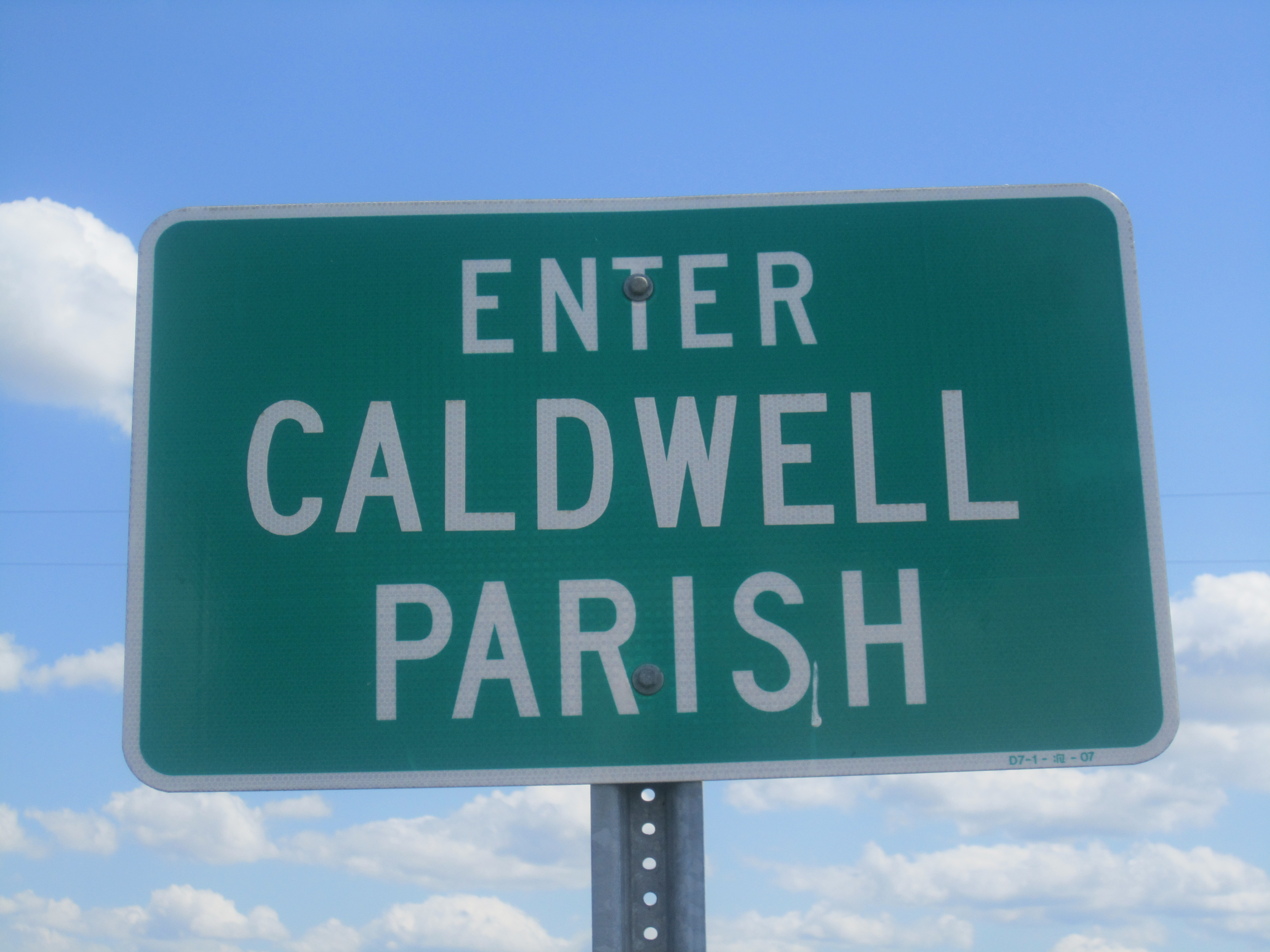

Caldwell Parish is a parish located in the U.S. state of Louisiana. As of 2020, its population was 9,645. The parish seat is Columbia.

== Geography ==
According to the U.S. Census Bureau, the parish has a total area of 541 square miles (1,400 km^{2}), of which 529 square miles (1,370 km^{2}) is land and 11 square miles (28 km^{2}) (2.1%) is water.

=== Major highways ===
- U.S. Highway 165
- Louisiana Highway 4
- Louisiana Highway 126
- Louisiana Highway 127
- Louisiana Highway 133
- Louisiana Highway 506
- Louisiana Highway 547
- Louisiana Highway 557
- Louisiana Highway 559
- Louisiana Highway 561
- Louisiana Highway 843
- Louisiana Highway 844
- Louisiana Highway 845
- Louisiana Highway 846
- Louisiana Highway 847
- Louisiana Highway 848
- Louisiana Highway 849
- Louisiana Highway 850
- Louisiana Highway 851

=== Adjacent parishes ===
- Jackson Parish (northwest)
- Ouachita Parish (north)
- Richland Parish (northeast)
- Franklin Parish (east)
- Catahoula Parish (southeast)
- La Salle Parish (south)
- Winn Parish (southwest)

== Communities ==
=== Towns ===
- Columbia (parish seat)

=== Villages ===
- Clarks
- Grayson

=== Census-designated place ===
- Banks Springs

=== Unincorporated communities ===
- Bosco
- Copenhagen
- Corey
- Hebert
- Kelly
- Ward 5

== Demographics ==
Historical population
Census	Pop.	Note	%±
1840	2,017		—
1850	2,815		39.6%
1860	4,833		71.7%
1870	4,820		−0.3%
1880	5,767		19.6%
1890	5,814		0.8%
1900	6,917		19.0%
1910	8,593		24.2%
1920	9,514		10.7%
1930	10,430		9.6%
1940	12,046		15.5%
1950	10,293		−14.6%
1960	9,004		−12.5%
1970	9,354		3.9%
1980	10,761		15.0%
1990	9,810		−8.8%
2000	10,560		7.6%
2010	10,132		−4.1%
2020	9,645		−4.8%
2025 (est.)	9,344	▼	−3.1%
U.S. Decennial Census; 1790-1960 1900-1990; 1990-2000 2010-2013

=== 2020 census ===
As of the 2020 census, the parish had a population of 9,645, 3,752 households, and 2,534 families. The median age was 41.2 years, 22.5% of residents were under the age of 18, and 18.9% were 65 years of age or older; for every 100 females there were 108.0 males, and for every 100 females age 18 and over there were 107.3 males age 18 and over.

There were 4,583 housing units, of which 18.1% were vacant. Among occupied housing units, 76.7% were owner-occupied and 23.3% were renter-occupied; the homeowner vacancy rate was 1.5% and the rental vacancy rate was 10.4%. About 30.4% of all households were made up of individuals and 13.8% had someone living alone who was 65 years of age or older.

<0.1% of residents lived in urban areas, while 100.0% lived in rural areas.

The racial makeup of the parish was 79.3% White, 15.9% Black or African American, 0.2% American Indian and Alaska Native, 0.4% Asian, <0.1% Native Hawaiian and Pacific Islander, 0.6% from some other race, and 3.6% from two or more races; Hispanic or Latino residents of any race comprised 2.3% of the population.

=== Racial and ethnic composition ===
Caldwell Parish, Louisiana – Racial and ethnic composition Note: the US Census treats Hispanic/Latino as an ethnic category. This table excludes Latinos from the racial categories and assigns them to a separate category. Hispanics/Latinos may be of any race.
Race / Ethnicity (NH = Non-Hispanic)	Pop 1980	Pop 1990	Pop 2000	Pop 2010	Pop 2020	% 1980	% 1990	% 2000	% 2010	% 2020
White alone (NH)	8,628	7,868	8,396	8,045	7,551	80.18%	80.20%	79.51%	79.40%	78.29%
Black or African American alone (NH)	1,958	1,760	1,884	1,735	1,528	18.20%	17.94%	17.84%	17.12%	15.84%
Native American or Alaska Native alone (NH)	1	9	47	19	19	0.01%	0.09%	0.45%	0.19%	0.20%
Asian alone (NH)	13	12	15	25	42	0.12%	0.12%	0.14%	0.25%	0.44%
Native Hawaiian or Pacific Islander alone (NH)	x	x	0	0	3	x	x	0.00%	0.00%	0.03%
Other race alone (NH)	0	1	4	2	6	0.00%	0.01%	0.04%	0.02%	0.06%
Mixed race or Multiracial (NH)	x	x	57	84	275	x	x	0.54%	0.83%	2.85%
Hispanic or Latino (any race)	161	160	157	222	221	1.50%	1.63%	1.49%	2.19%	2.29%
Total	10,761	9,810	10,560	10,132	9,645	100.00%	100.00%	100.00%	100.00%	100.00%

=== 2000 census ===
As of the 2000 census, there were 10,560 people, 3,941 households, and 2,817 families residing in the parish. The population density was 20 people per square mile (7.7 people/km^{2}). There were 5,035 housing units at an average density of 10 per square mile (3.9/km^{2}).

In 2000, the racial makeup of the parish was 80.43% White, 17.90% Black or African American, 0.45% Native American, 0.14% Asian, 0.47% from other races, and 0.61% from two or more races. 1.49% of the population were Hispanic or Latino of any race.

== Law enforcement ==
The Caldwell Parish Sheriff's Office is the primary law enforcement agency of the parish.

== Politics ==
Caldwell Parish has been a Republican stronghold since the 1960s. Bill Clinton carried it in 1992 and 1996, which was partly due to heavy third-party presence in those presidential elections. Since then, the Republican strength in the Parish has improved in every single election, with Donald Trump obtaining nearly 86% of the vote in 2024.

United States presidential election results for Caldwell Parish, Louisiana
Year	Republican		Democratic		Third party(ies)	
Year	No.	%	No.	%	No.	%
1912	18	3.57%	366	72.62%	120	23.81%
1916	20	3.47%	554	96.01%	3	0.52%
1920	128	19.19%	539	80.81%	0	0.00%
1924	77	14.72%	442	84.51%	4	0.76%
1928	288	26.42%	802	73.58%	0	0.00%
1932	86	5.58%	1,448	93.96%	7	0.45%
1936	235	14.63%	1,371	85.37%	0	0.00%
1940	318	16.01%	1,668	83.99%	0	0.00%
1944	505	30.66%	1,142	69.34%	0	0.00%
1948	151	8.64%	777	44.45%	820	46.91%
1952	961	45.27%	1,162	54.73%	0	0.00%
1956	587	35.17%	468	28.04%	614	36.79%
1960	716	35.08%	694	34.00%	631	30.92%
1964	2,534	80.62%	609	19.38%	0	0.00%
1968	490	13.19%	973	26.19%	2,252	60.62%
1972	2,306	76.99%	508	16.96%	181	6.04%
1976	1,890	49.66%	1,830	48.08%	86	2.26%
1980	2,653	57.91%	1,786	38.99%	142	3.10%
1984	3,341	69.33%	1,348	27.97%	130	2.70%
1988	2,997	65.74%	1,423	31.21%	139	3.05%
1992	1,752	37.40%	2,061	44.00%	871	18.60%
1996	1,842	40.40%	2,117	46.44%	600	13.16%
2000	2,817	65.09%	1,359	31.40%	152	3.51%
2004	3,308	69.61%	1,384	29.12%	60	1.26%
2008	3,696	75.54%	1,118	22.85%	79	1.61%
2012	3,640	77.18%	1,016	21.54%	60	1.27%
2016	3,822	81.46%	788	16.79%	82	1.75%
2020	3,976	83.49%	745	15.64%	41	0.86%
2024	3,724	85.93%	580	13.38%	30	0.69%

== Notable people ==
- Buddy Caldwell, Louisiana State Attorney General, 2008–2016
- Graves B. Erskine, Marine Corps General Officer (4-Star)
- Garland Gregory, LA Tech Football
- Pam Kelly, recipient of the Wade Trophy
- John J. McKeithen, Governor of Louisiana (1964–1972)
- W. Fox McKeithen, Louisiana House of Representatives (1984–1988)
- Clay Parker, LSU baseball pitcher and football punter (1981-1985)
- Neil Riser, Louisiana State Senator elected in 2007
- Chet D. Traylor, Louisiana Supreme Court, 1997–2009

== Gallery ==
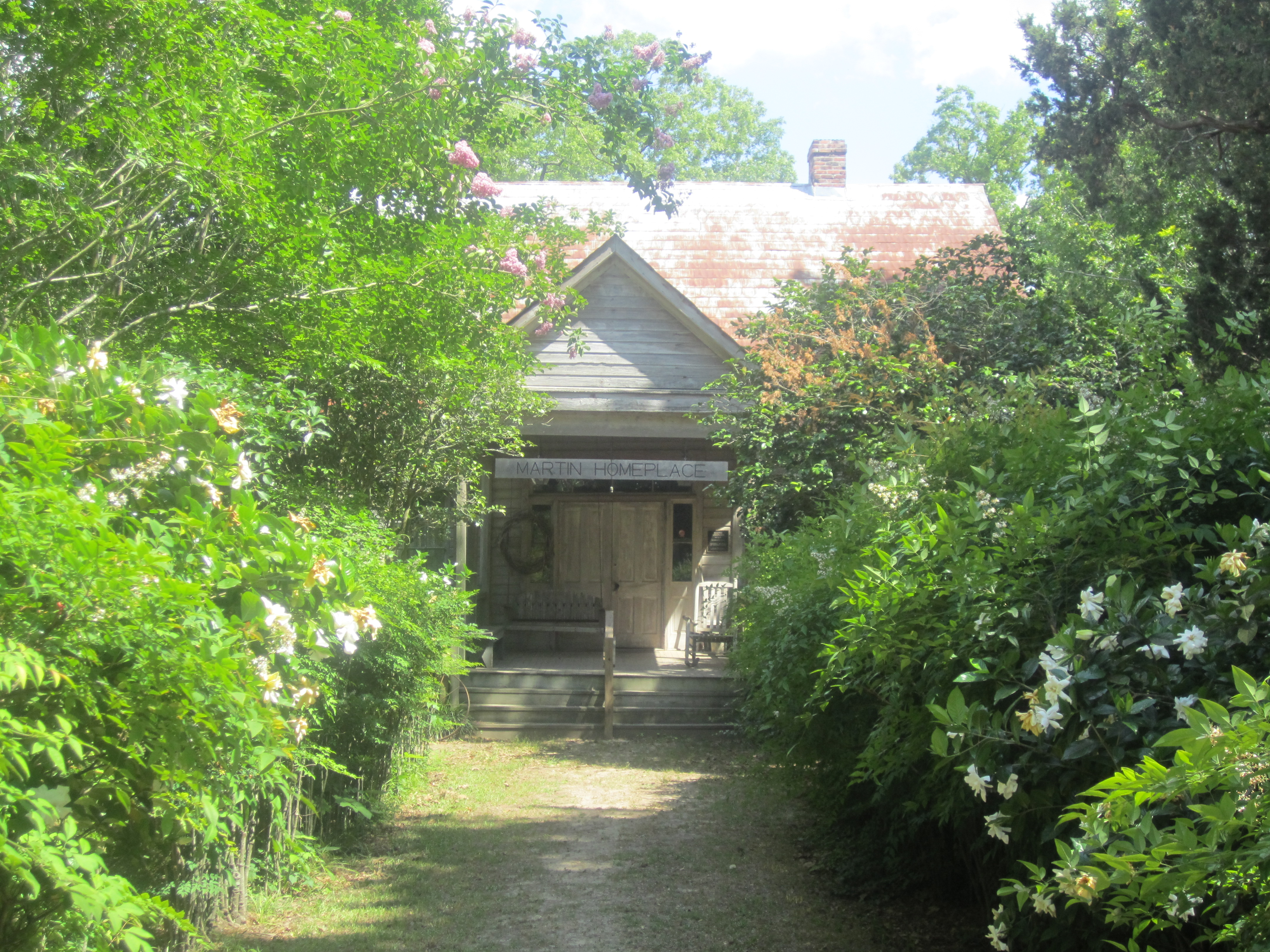
Martin Homeplace Museum outside Columbia

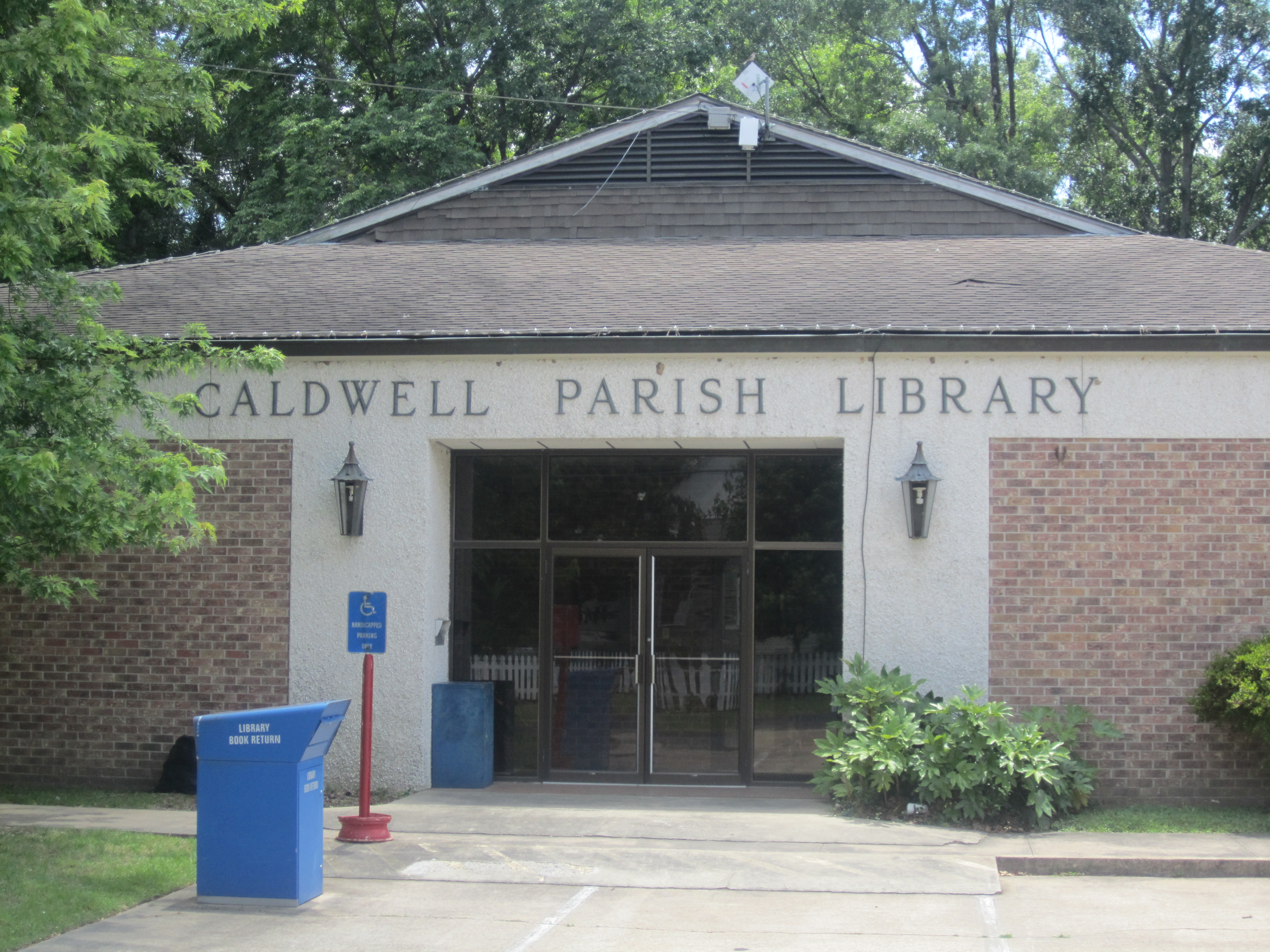
The Caldwell Parish Library is located behind the courthouse in Columbia

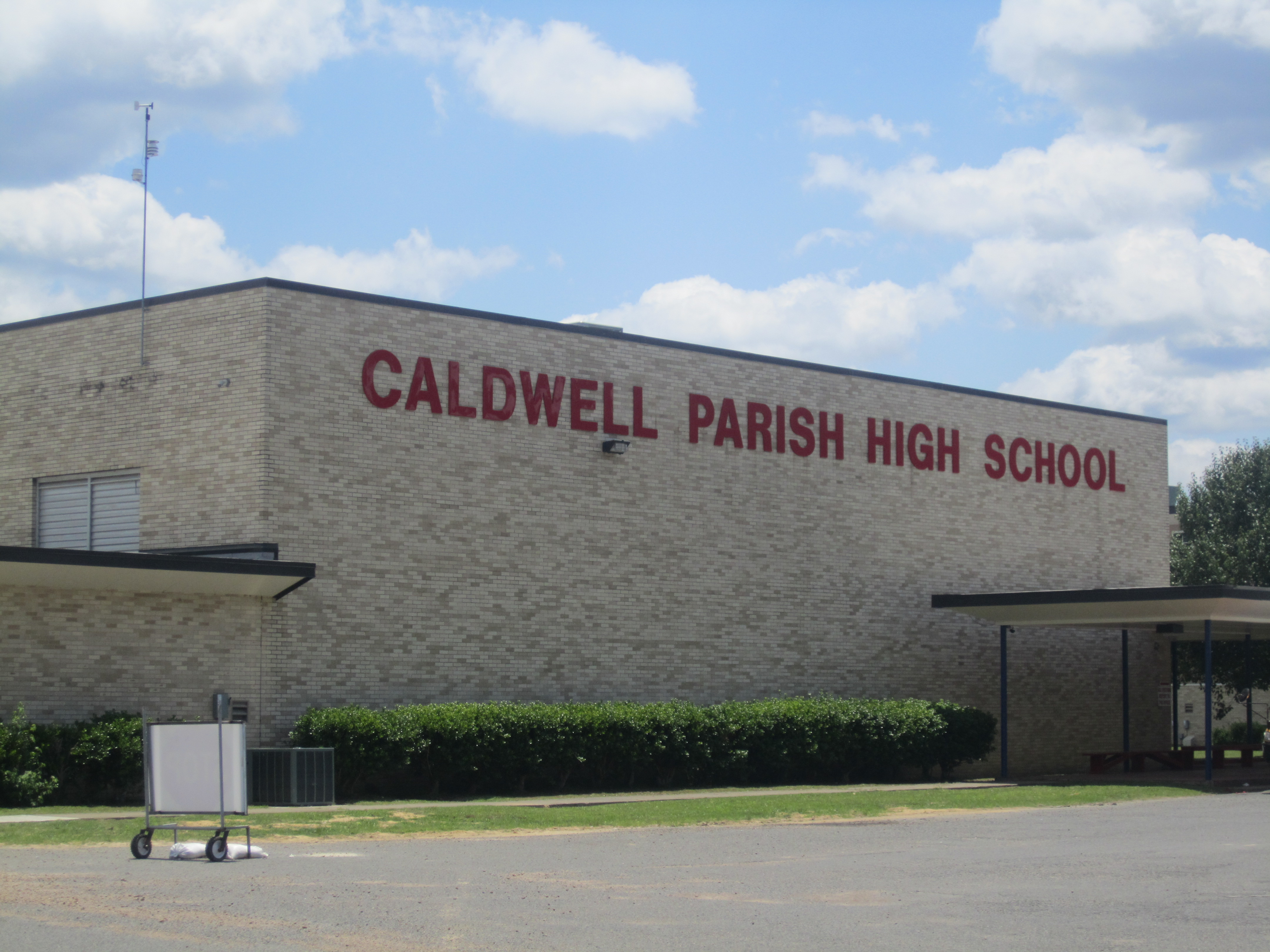
Caldwell Parish High School

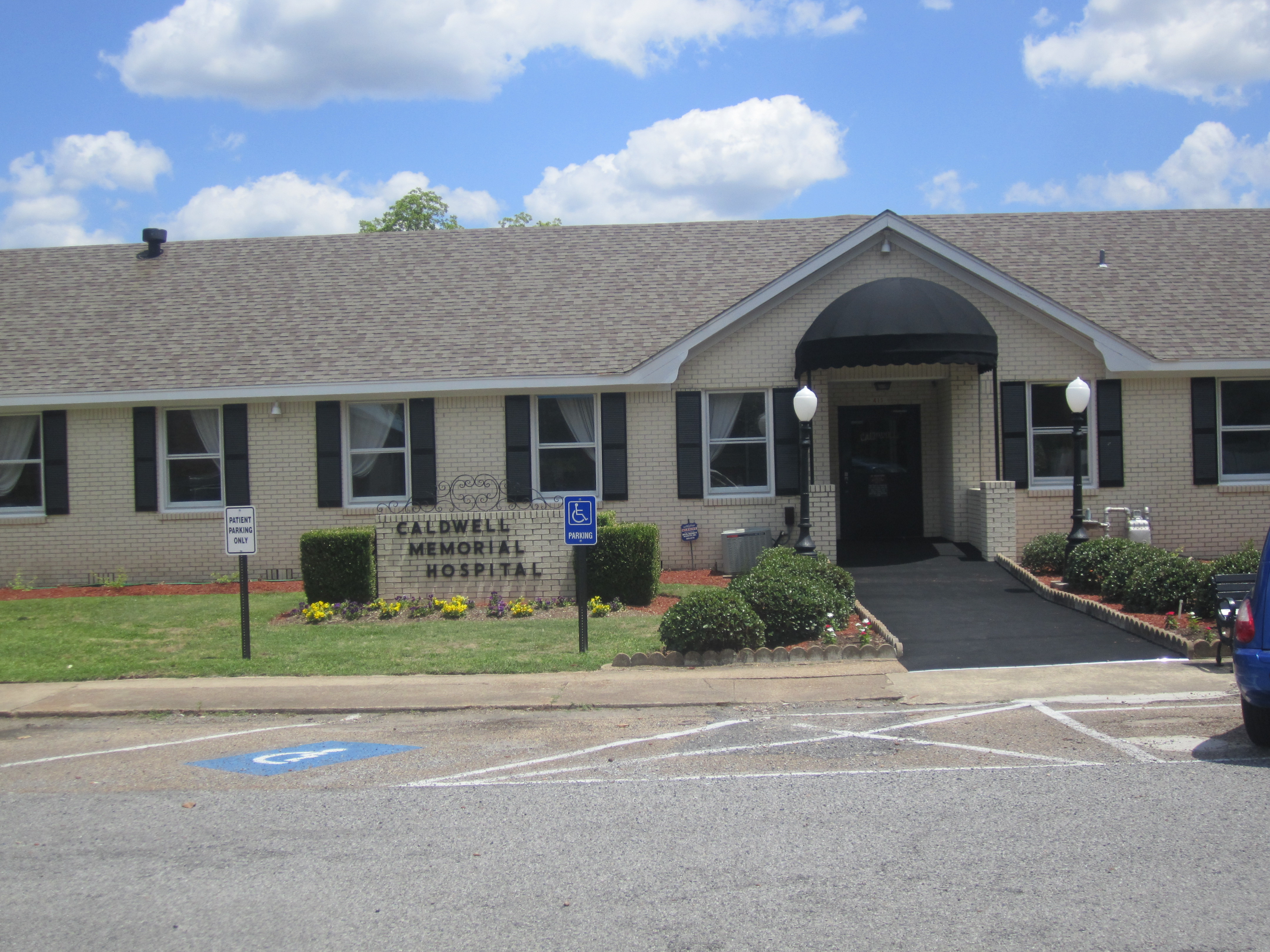
Caldwell Memorial Hospital in Columbia

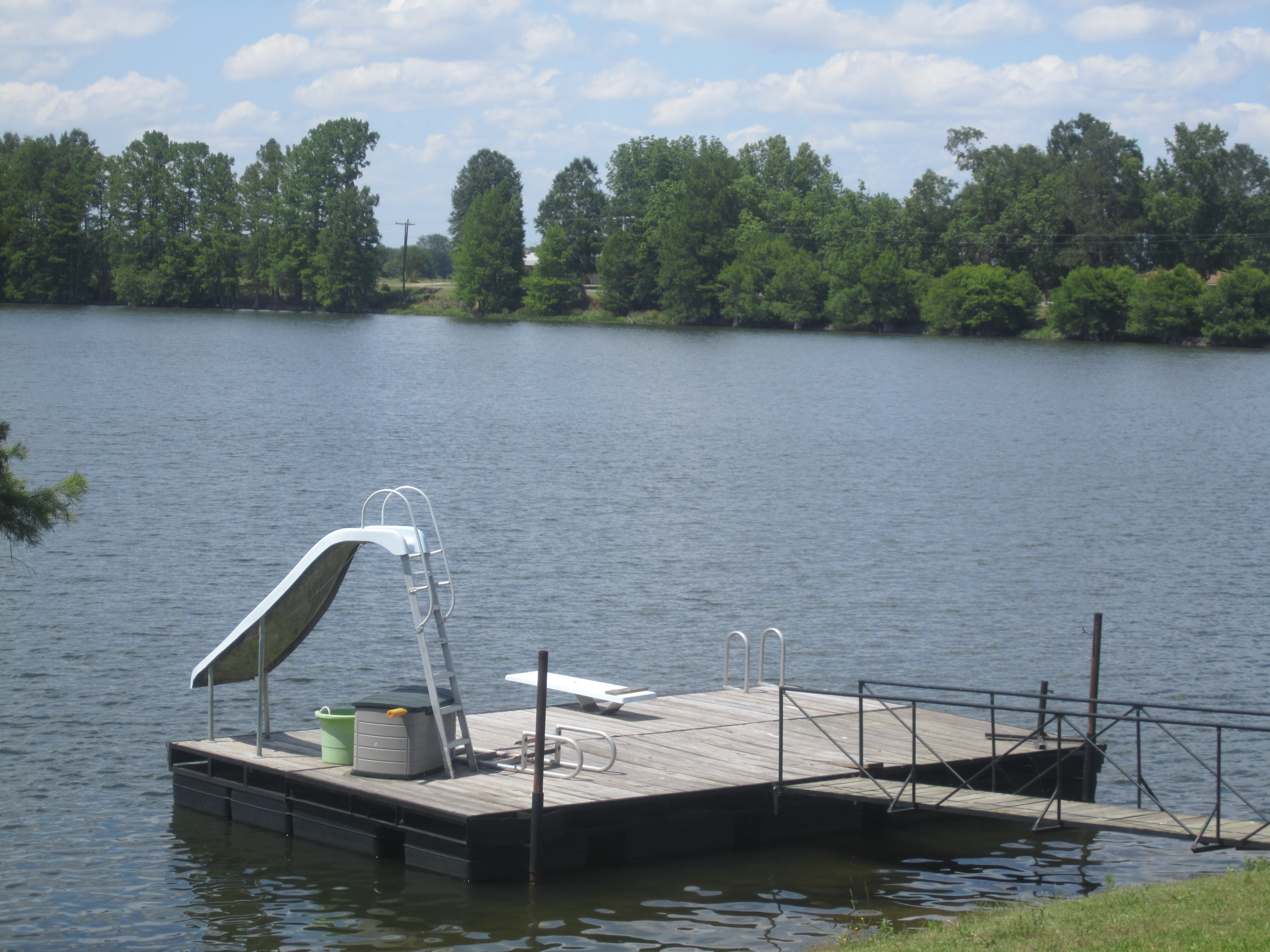
Long Lake in Caldwell Parish; a landowner builds a pier with slide and diving board.

== See also ==
- National Register of Historic Places listings in Caldwell Parish, Louisiana

== See also ==
- Caldwell Parish School Board
