= Copenhagen, Louisiana =

- Unincorporated community
- Location within Louisiana Location within the United States
- Coordinates: 32°01′26″N 92°02′20″W
- Country: United States
- State: Louisiana
- Parish: Caldwell
- Elevation: 213 ft (65 m)
- Time zone: UTC-6 (Central (CST))
  - Summer (DST): UTC-5 (CDT)
- ZIP code: 71418
- Area code: 318
- GNIS feature ID: 554086

Copenhagen is an unincorporated community in Caldwell Parish, Louisiana, United States. It is located northeast of Holum, on Highway 849, west and south of the Ouachita River. Its ZIP code is 71418.
