= Marion, Louisiana =

- Town
- Location of Marion in Union Parish, Louisiana.

- Location of Louisiana in the United States
- Coordinates: 32°54′09″N 92°14′46″W
- Country: United States
- State: Louisiana
- Parish: Union

Area
  - Total: 3.22 sq mi (8.34 km^{2})
  - Land: 3.21 sq mi (8.31 km^{2})
  - Water: 0.012 sq mi (0.03 km^{2})
- Elevation: 187 ft (57 m)

Population (2020)
  - Total: 623
  - Density: 194.1/sq mi (74.93/km^{2})
- Time zone: UTC-6 (CST)
  - Summer (DST): UTC-5 (CDT)
- Area code: 318
- FIPS code: 22-48645
- GNIS feature ID: 2406100
- Website: marionla.org

Marion is a town in Union Parish, Louisiana, United States. As of the 2020 census, Marion had a population of 623. This population includes the village of Truxno in the northwestern corner of the city limits. It is part of the Monroe Metropolitan Statistical Area.

== History ==
Little is known about the early history of Marion, but it is believed that the first settlers of the area were the family of a man named David Stewart who came from Marion, Alabama in 1832. This has caused confusion as some sources state this is how the town got its name, while others argue it was named after the Lieutenant Colonel and later Brigadier General Francis Marion of the American Revolutionary War. Also known as the "swamp fox".

Marion was a part of Ouachita Parish until 1839 when it became a part of the new Union Parish.

Marion was incorporated as a town in 1852.

== Geography ==
According to the United States Census Bureau, the town has a total area of 3.2 square miles (8.3 km^{2}), of which, 3.2 square miles (8.3 km^{2}) of it is land and 0.31% is water.

== Demographics ==
Historical population
Census	Pop.	Note	%±
1910	226		—
1920	371		64.2%
1930	444		19.7%
1940	481		8.3%
1950	685		42.4%
1960	685		0.0%
1970	796		16.2%
1980	989		24.2%
1990	775		−21.6%
2000	806		4.0%
2010	765		−5.1%
2020	623		−18.6%
2025 (est.)	595	▼	−4.5%
U.S. Decennial Census

Marion racial composition as of 2020
Race	Number	Percentage
White (non-Hispanic)	232	37.24%
Black or African American (non-Hispanic)	361	57.95%
Native American	1	0.16%
Other/Mixed	22	3.53%
Hispanic or Latino	7	1.12%

As of the 2020 United States census, there were 623 people, 294 households, and 211 families residing in the town.

== Education ==
Residents were assigned to Union Parish Public Schools' Marion High School (K-12) until June 2013, when the school closed down due to a lack of students in the 2012–13 school year. Marion students since the 2013–14 academic season go to the Union Parish High School located in Farmerville, Louisiana.

== Notable people ==
- John David Crow, Heisman Trophy Winner, 1957; born in Marion, 1935
- Walt Goldsby (1861–1914), 19th century baseball player, born in Marion

== See also ==
- LA 143
