= Jones, Louisiana =

- Unincorporated community
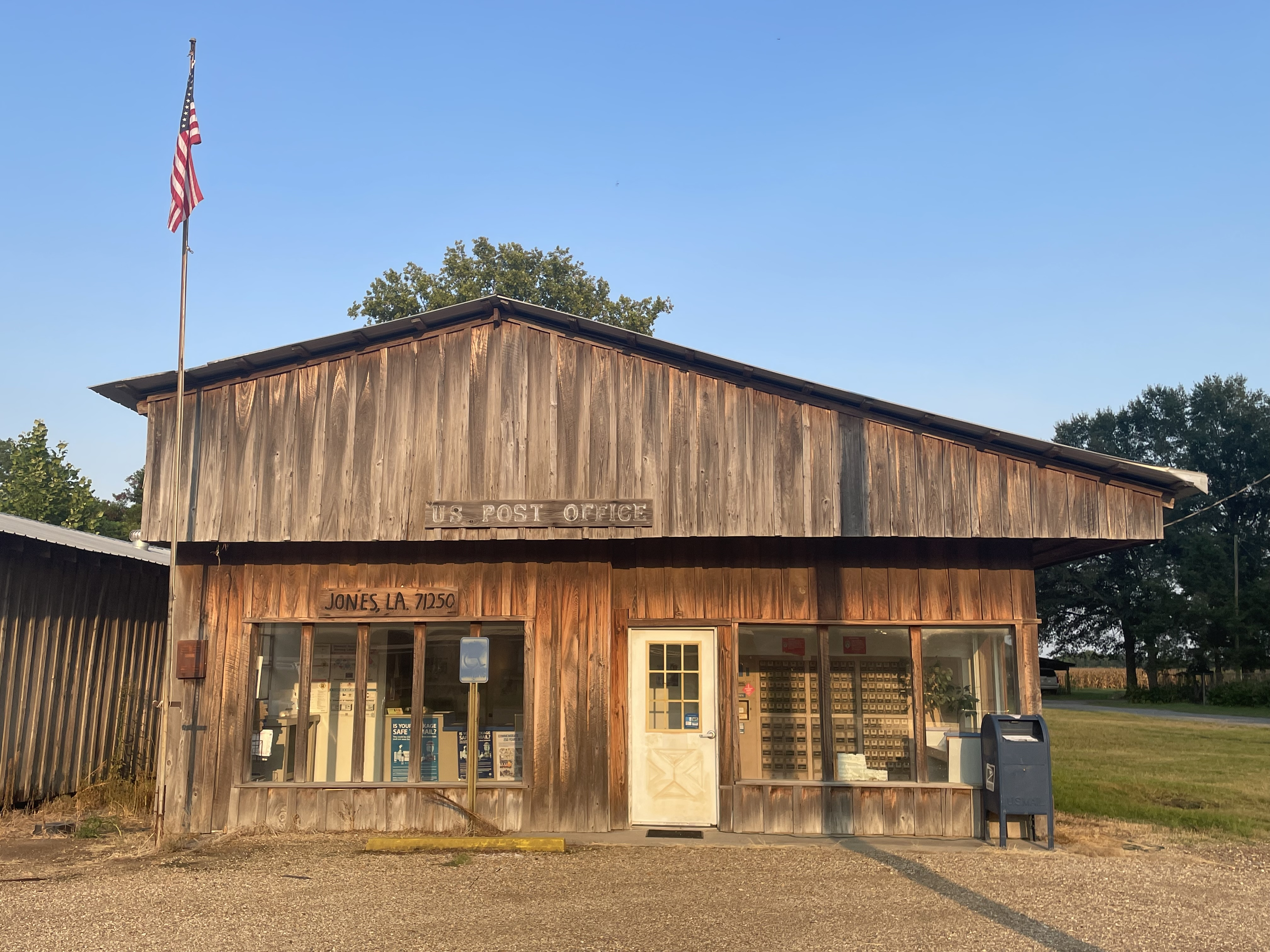
- Jones Post Office

- Location within Louisiana Location within the United States
- Coordinates: 32°58′03″N 91°38′53″W
- Country: United States
- State: Louisiana
- Parish: Morehouse
- Elevation: 105 ft (32 m)
- Time zone: UTC-6 (Central (CST))
  - Summer (DST): UTC-5 (CDT)
- ZIP code: 71250
- Area code: 318
- GNIS feature ID: 543346

Jones is an unincorporated community in Morehouse Parish, Louisiana, United States. The community is located along U.S. Route 165, 3.7 miles (6.0 km) north-northeast of Bonita. Jones has a post office with ZIP code 71250.
