= Lake D'Arbonne State Park =

State park in Louisiana, United States

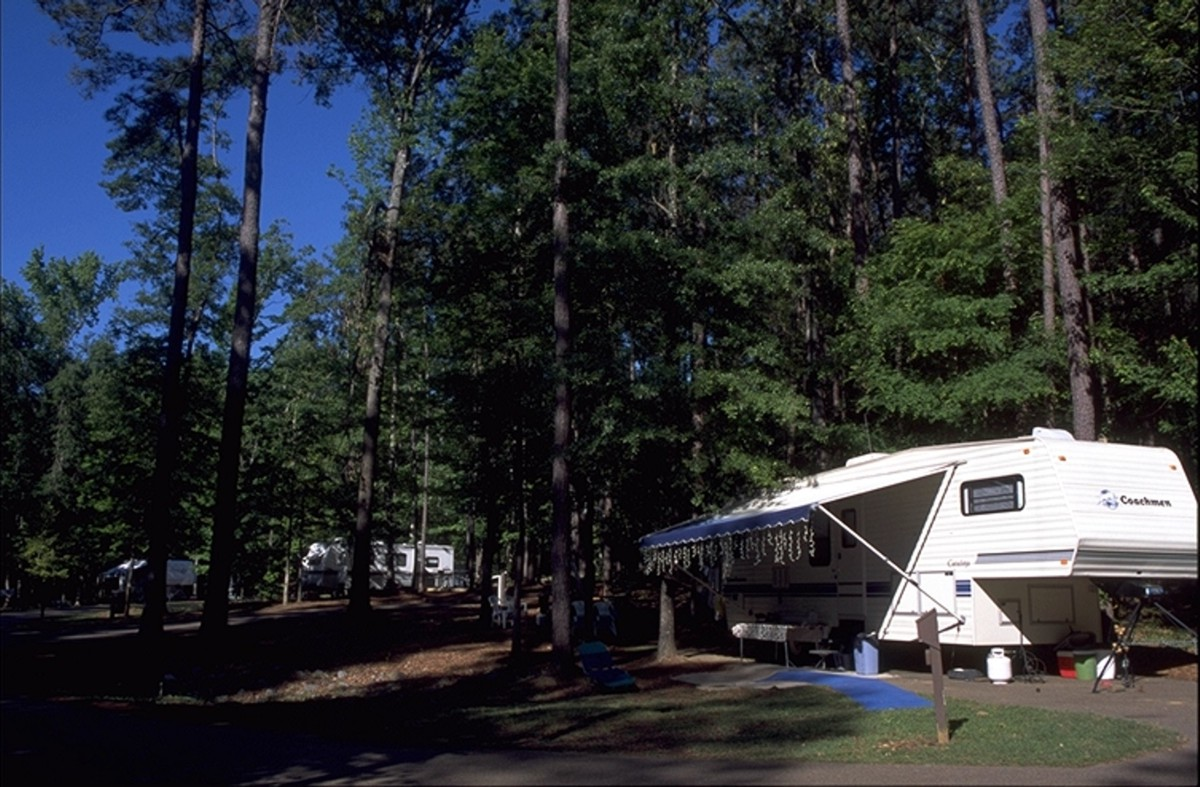
- Camping area at the park

- Location within Louisiana
- Location: Union Parish, Louisiana, United States of America
- Coordinates: 32°47′12″N 92°29′24″W
- Area: 655 acres (2.65 km^{2}; 1.023 sq mi)
- Established: 1967
- Visitors: 62,897 (in 2022)
- Governing body: Louisiana Office of State Parks
- Website: Official website

Lake D'Arbonne State Park is 655 acres (2.65 km^{2}) in size and lies in a hilly region adjacent to Lake D'Arbonne in Union Parish, Louisiana, USA. It can be reached by taking La. Hwy. 2 west from Farmerville about 5 miles (8.0 km), then left (south) on Evergreen Road, then 0.25 miles (0.40 km) take another left at the park entrance.

The state park is a popular place to play disc golf, fish, camp and hike. Accommodations at the park include 58 campsites (51 improved, 7 deluxe), 16 cabins and 2 lodges. A network of hiking and walking trails go throughout the park (one of which has one of the most grueling and difficult disc golf courses in the world). The four main trails are color-coded Orange, Green, White and Blue. Visitors may rent kayaks, by the day or hour. It is also the only State Park in Louisiana with tennis courts.

Wildlife is abundant in the mixed pine-hardwood forest at Lake D'Arbonne and deer sightings occur regularly.
