= Clarks, Louisiana =

- Village
- Village of Clarks
- Location of Clarks in Caldwell Parish, Louisiana.

- Location of Louisiana in the United States
- Coordinates: 32°01′44″N 92°08′27″W
- Country: United States
- State: Louisiana
- Parish: Caldwell

Area
  - Total: 0.96 sq mi (2.49 km^{2})
  - Land: 0.96 sq mi (2.49 km^{2})
  - Water: 0 sq mi (0.00 km^{2})
- Elevation: 148 ft (45 m)

Population (2020)
  - Total: 1,052
  - Rank: CW: 1st
  - Density: 1,096.1/sq mi (423.19/km^{2})
- Time zone: UTC-6 (CST)
  - Summer (DST): UTC-5 (CDT)
- Area code: 318
- FIPS code: 22-15780
- GNIS feature ID: 2407433
- Website: townofclarksla.org

Clarks is a rural village in Caldwell Parish, Louisiana, United States. As of the 2020 census, Clarks had a population of 1,052. Clarks is the largest community by population in Caldwell Parish.

== Geography ==
Clarks is located southwest of the center of Caldwell Parish. U.S. Route 165 passes by the east side of the village, leading northeast 7 miles (11 km) to Columbia, the parish seat, and southwest 11 miles (18 km) to Olla.

According to the United States Census Bureau, Clarks has a total area of 0.97 square miles (2.5 km^{2}), all land.

== Demographics ==
Historical population
Census	Pop.	Note	%±
1950	1,345		—
1960	940		−30.1%
1970	889		−5.4%
1980	931		4.7%
1990	650		−30.2%
2000	1,071		64.8%
2010	1,017		−5.0%
2020	1,052		3.4%
2025 (est.)	1,034	▼	−1.7%
U.S. Decennial Census; 1950 1960 1970 1980; 1990 2000 2010

Clarks first appeared as an unincorporated place in the 1950 U.S. census; and as a town in the 1960 U.S. census.

As of the census of 2000, there were 1,071 people, 246 households, and 160 families residing in the village. The population density was 1,112.7 inhabitants per square mile (429.6/km^{2}). There were 270 housing units at an average density of 280.5 per square mile (108.3/km^{2}). The racial makeup of the village was 48.74% White, 47.90% African American, 1.21% Native American, 0.09% Asian, 1.40% from other races, and 0.65% from two or more races. Hispanic or Latino of any race were 2.24% of the population.

There were 246 households, out of which 29.3% had children under the age of 18 living with them, 47.6% were married couples living together, 12.6% had a female householder with no husband present, and 34.6% were non-families. 30.1% of all households were made up of individuals, and 17.5% had someone living alone who was 65 years of age or older. The average household size was 2.39 and the average family size was 2.98.

In the village, the population was spread out, with 14.0% under the age of 18, 21.8% from 18 to 24, 38.1% from 25 to 44, 17.2% from 45 to 64, and 9.0% who were 65 years of age or older. The median age was 31 years. For every 100 females, there were 200.8 males. For every 100 females age 18 and over, there were 225.4 males.

The median income for a household in the village was $19,583, and the median income for a family was $27,083. Males had a median income of $22,500 versus $18,438 for females. The per capita income for the village was $7,039. About 19.9% of families and 27.1% of the population were below the poverty line, including 26.9% of those under age 18 and 38.2% of those age 65 or over.

In 2010, Clarks had the 13th-lowest median household income of all places in the United States with a population over 1,000.
