= Rosefield, Louisiana =

Coordinates: 31°53′28″N 91°59′55″W

Rosefield is an unincorporated community in Catahoula Parish, Louisiana. and Lasalle Parish, Louisiana. Both parishes run through Rosefield. The area code is 318.

The United States Postal Service office in Olla, Louisiana serves residents in the Rosefield area. The corresponding zip code is 71465. A post office used to stand in Rosefield during the early to mid-20th century but was decommissioned after the World War II. There was also a public school in the community but it was closed sometime during the 1930s or 1940's. All that remains of the community is the Rosefield Baptist Church and the Rosefield Cemetery.

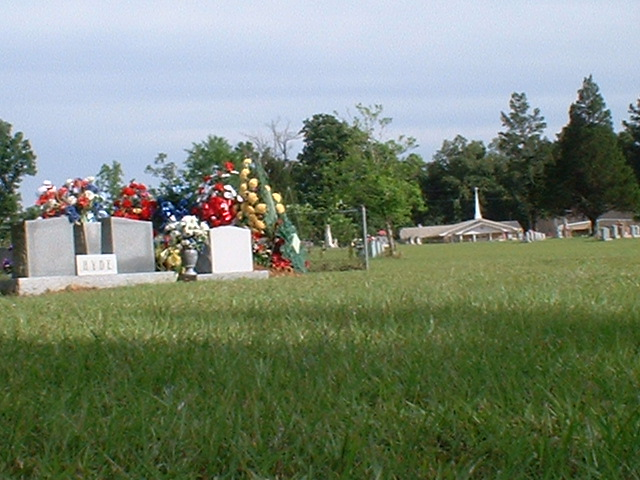
Rosefield graveyard with Rosefield Baptist Church in the background

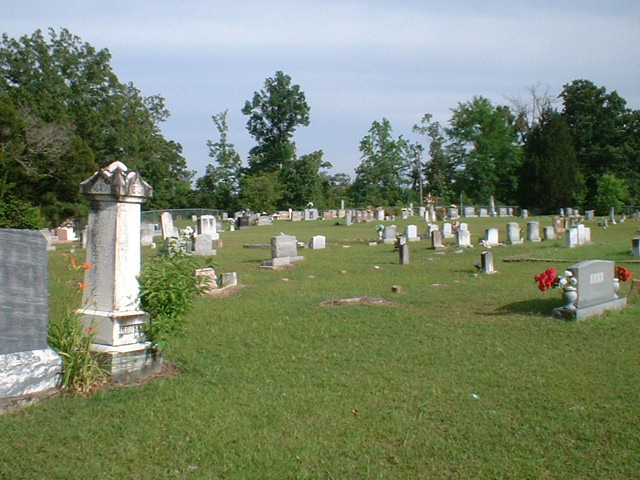
Rosefield graveyard
