= Lake D'Arbonne =

Lake D’Arbonne
- Location within Louisiana Location within the United States
- Location: Union Parish, near Farmerville, Louisiana
- Coordinates: 32°45′41″N 92°25′26″W
- Type: reservoir
- Basin countries: United States
- Surface area: 15,250 acres (62 km^{2})
- Surface elevation: 79 ft (24 m)

Lake D’Arbonne is a man-made reservoir located near and around the town of Farmerville in Union Parish in north Louisiana. Lake D’Arbonne State Park, a state-maintained camping and recreation area, is located on the lake. Louisiana State Highway 33 bridge crosses the lake.

== History ==
The lake has a combined estimated area of 15,250 acres (62 km^{2}), first planned in 1957. In 1961, a 2,450 feet (750 m)-long, 54 feet (16 m) tall concrete dam was built by the Louisiana Department of Public Works. The lake began to fill by 1963. Lake D’Arbonne State Park, a state-maintained camping and recreation area, is located on the lake.

The Louisiana State Highway 33 bridge crosses the lake and named for James Peyton Smith, the state representative from Union and Morehouse parishes from 1964 to 1972.

The larger lower portion, called the big or main section, is fed by Stowe, Bear, and Hurricane Creeks. The smaller section above the bridge is fed by the Corney and Little D’Arbonne creeks. In the northern part, Louisiana Highway 2 crosses the lake with two bridges.
