= Lillie, Louisiana =

- Village
- Village of Lillie
- Location of Lillie in Union Parish, Louisiana.

- Location of Louisiana in the United States
- Coordinates: 32°55′19″N 92°39′41″W
- Country: United States
- State: Louisiana
- Parish: Union

Area
  - Total: 1.94 sq mi (5.02 km^{2})
  - Land: 1.93 sq mi (5.00 km^{2})
  - Water: 0.012 sq mi (0.03 km^{2})
- Elevation: 171 ft (52 m)

Population (2020)
  - Total: 111
  - Density: 57.5/sq mi (22.22/km^{2})
- Time zone: UTC-6 (CST)
  - Summer (DST): UTC-5 (CDT)
- Area code: 318
- FIPS code: 22-43920
- GNIS feature ID: 2407490

Lillie is a village in Union Parish, Louisiana, United States. As of the 2020 census, Lillie had a population of 111. It is part of the Monroe Metropolitan Statistical Area.

According to a 2007 report Lillie was named one of the 10 worst speed traps in the state of Louisiana. Lillie made 85.59% of its revenue, an average of roughly $508 per capita population, from fines and forfeitures in the 2005 fiscal year.

== Geography ==
According to the United States Census Bureau, the village has a total area of 1.9 square miles (5.0 km^{2}), of which 1.9 square miles (5.0 km^{2}) is land and 0.04 square mile (0.1 km^{2}) (1.03%) is water.

Lillie has a humid subtropical climate (Koppen Cfa). It experiences hot, humid summers and mild winters.

== Demographics ==
Historical population
Census	Pop.	Note	%±
1970	160		—
1980	172		7.5%
1990	145		−15.7%
2000	139		−4.1%
2010	118		−15.1%
2020	111		−5.9%
2025 (est.)	109	▼	−1.8%
U.S. Decennial Census

As of the census of 2000, there were 139 people, 54 households, and 36 families residing in the village. The population density was 72.3 inhabitants per square mile (27.9/km^{2}). There were 65 housing units at an average density of 33.8 per square mile (13.1/km^{2}). The racial makeup of the village was 72.66% White, 23.74% African American, 2.88% from other races, and 0.72% from two or more races. Hispanic or Latino of any race were 4.32% of the population.

There were 54 households, out of which 25.9% had children under the age of 18 living with them, 53.7% were married couples living together, 13.0% had a female householder with no husband present, and 31.5% were non-families. 29.6% of all households were made up of individuals, and 20.4% had someone living alone who was 65 years of age or older. The average household size was 2.57 and the average family size was 3.24.

In the village, the population was spread out, with 20.9% under the age of 18, 13.7% from 18 to 24, 23.7% from 25 to 44, 24.5% from 45 to 64, and 17.3% who were 65 years of age or older. The median age was 39 years. For every 100 females, there were 98.6 males. For every 100 females age 18 and over, there were 100.0 males.

The median income for a household in the village was $29,167, and the median income for a family was $40,000. Males had a median income of $28,750 versus $21,250 for females. The per capita income for the village was $14,404. There were 5.0% of families and 10.6% of the population living below the poverty line, including 6.3% of under eighteens and 8.0% of those over 64.
