= Downsville, Louisiana =

- Village
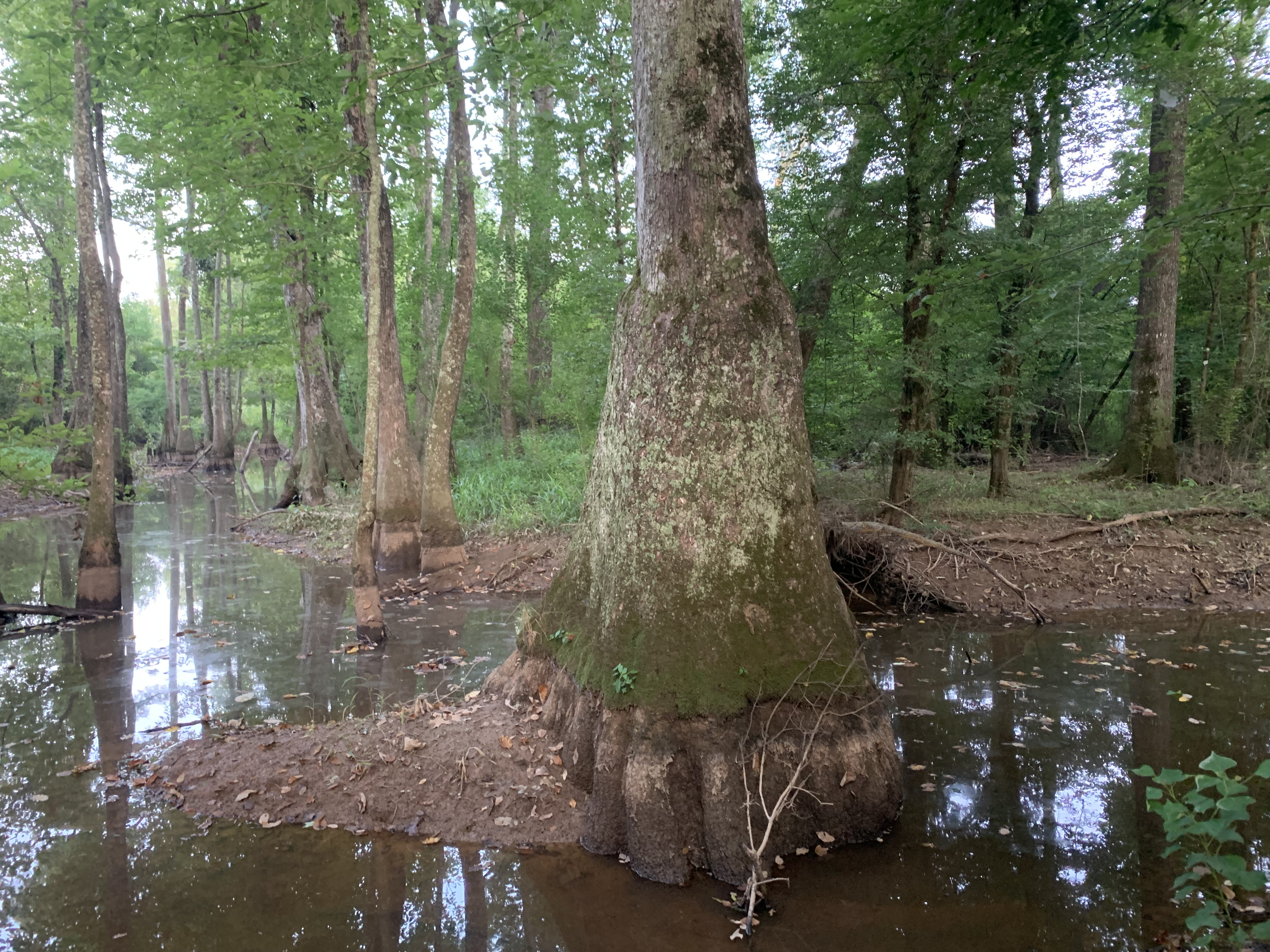

- Location of Downsville in Union Parish, Louisiana.

- Location of Louisiana in the United States
- Coordinates: 32°37′28″N 92°24′47″W
- Country: United States
- State: Louisiana
- Parishes: Lincoln, Union

Area
  - Total: 0.75 sq mi (1.93 km^{2})
  - Land: 0.75 sq mi (1.93 km^{2})
  - Water: 0 sq mi (0.00 km^{2})
- Elevation: 243 ft (74 m)

Population (2020)
  - Total: 120
  - Density: 161/sq mi (62.3/km^{2})
- Time zone: UTC-6 (CST)
  - Summer (DST): UTC-5 (CDT)
- Area code: 318
- FIPS code: 22-21450
- GNIS feature ID: 2407442

Downsville is a village in Lincoln and Union parishes in the U.S. state of Louisiana. As of the 2020 census, Downsville had a population of 120.

The Lincoln Parish portion of Downsville is part of the Ruston Micropolitan Statistical Area, while the Union Parish portion is part of the Monroe Metropolitan Statistical Area. Downsville is made up of many communities, including Downtown Downsville, Holmesville, Point-Wilhite, and the Mt. Ararat Baptist Church community. There are several more.

Downsville was named for U.S. Senator Solomon W. Downs.

== Geography ==
According to the United States Census Bureau, the village has a total area of 0.8 square miles (1.9 km^{2}), all land.

== Demographics ==
Historical population
| Census | Pop. | Note | %± |
|---|---|---|---|
| 1980 | 213 | | — |
| 1990 | 101 | | −52.6% |
| 2000 | 118 | | 16.8% |
| 2010 | 141 | | 19.5% |
| 2020 | 120 | | −14.9% |
| 2025 (est.) | 113 | ▼ | −5.8% |
U.S. Decennial Census

=== 2000 census ===
As of the census of 2000, there were 118 people, 46 households, and 35 families residing in the village. The population density was 158.0 inhabitants per square mile (61.0/km^{2}). There were 53 housing units at an average density of 71.0 units per square mile (27.4 units/km^{2}). The racial makeup of the village was 97.46% White, and 2.54% African American.

There were 46 households, out of which 34.8% had children under the age of 18 living with them, 60.9% were married couples living together, 10.9% had a female householder with no husband present, and 23.9% were non-families. 23.9% of all households were made up of individuals, and 19.6% had someone living alone who was 65 years of age or older. The average household size was 2.57 and the average family size was 3.06.

In the village, the population was spread out, with 26.3% under the age of 18, 11.0% from 18 to 24, 22.9% from 25 to 44, 23.7% from 45 to 64, and 16.1% who were 65 years of age or older. The median age was 38 years. For every 100 females, there were 71.0 males. For every 100 females age 18 and over, there were 67.3 males.

The median income for a household in the village was $51,250, and the median income for a family was $58,333. Males had a median income of $40,250 versus $21,250 for females. The per capita income for the village was $23,468. There were 7.9% of families and 6.0% of the population living below the poverty line, including 5.7% of under eighteens and 5.0% of those over 64.

=== 2010 census ===
According to the census of 2010, the population grew to 141 people.

=== 2020 census ===
Downsville racial composition
| Race | Number | Percentage |
|---|---|---|
| White (non-Hispanic) | 101 | 84.17% |
| Native American | 3 | 2.5% |
| Asian | 3 | 2.5% |
| Other/Mixed | 5 | 4.17% |
| Hispanic or Latino | 8 | 6.67% |

As of the 2020 United States census, there were 120 people, 49 households, and 35 families residing in the village.

== Education ==
Union Parish residents are assigned to Union Parish Public Schools's Downsville Community Charter School (K-12).
