= Spearsville, Louisiana =

- Village
- Village of Spearsville
- Location of Spearsville in Union Parish, Louisiana.

- Location of Louisiana in the United States
- Coordinates: 32°55′55″N 92°36′00″W
- Country: United States
- State: Louisiana
- Parish: Union

Area
  - Total: 2.37 sq mi (6.13 km^{2})
  - Land: 2.37 sq mi (6.13 km^{2})
  - Water: 0 sq mi (0.00 km^{2})
- Elevation: 167 ft (51 m)

Population (2020)
  - Total: 126
  - Density: 53.3/sq mi (20.56/km^{2})
- Time zone: UTC-6 (CST)
  - Summer (DST): UTC-5 (CDT)
- Area code: 318
- FIPS code: 22-72170
- GNIS feature ID: 2407552

Spearsville is a village in Union Parish, Louisiana, United States. The population was 126 at the 2020 census, a decrease from 137 in 2010. It is part of the Monroe Metropolitan Statistical Area.

== History ==
Almost all of Spearsville's early history seems to have been lost as little is known about the origin of the village. It is believed that the lack of governmental records supports the idea that Spearsville began as a trading post. The earliest confirmed record of settlement in the area is from 1875 when the Spearsville Church of Christ was built. An 1895 map of Union Parish claims that a post office was operating since 1848, as well as the fact that the settlement was known as "Spears Store" at one point in time. It is unknown if these two claims are legitimate.

Spearsville was incorporated as a village in 1958.

== Geography ==
According to the United States Census Bureau, the village has a total area of 2.1 square miles (5.3 km^{2}), all land.

== Demographics ==
Historical population
Census	Pop.	Note	%±
1880	84		—
1970	197		—
1980	181		−8.1%
1990	132		−27.1%
2000	155		17.4%
2010	137		−11.6%
2020	126		−8.0%
2025 (est.)	123	▼	−2.4%
U.S. Decennial Census

As of the census of 2000, there were 155 people, 71 households, and 42 families residing in the village. The population density was 75.4 inhabitants per square mile (29.1/km^{2}). There were 87 housing units at an average density of 42.3 per square mile (16.3/km^{2}). The racial makeup of the village was 96.77% White, 3.23% from other races. Hispanic or Latino of any race were 3.23% of the population.

There were 71 households, out of which 23.9% had children under the age of 18 living with them, 54.9% were married couples living together, 1.4% had a female householder with no husband present, and 40.8% were non-families. 39.4% of all households were made up of individuals, and 29.6% had someone living alone who was 65 years of age or older. The average household size was 2.18 and the average family size was 2.95.

In the village, the population was spread out, with 23.9% under the age of 18, 7.7% from 18 to 24, 18.1% from 25 to 44, 22.6% from 45 to 64, and 27.7% who were 65 years of age or older. The median age was 46 years. For every 100 females, there were 86.7 males. For every 100 females age 18 and over, there were 84.4 males.

The median income for a household in the village was $26,250, and the median income for a family was $36,719. Males had a median income of $38,125 versus $16,667 for females. The per capita income for the village was $13,542. About 23.4% of families and 23.3% of the population were below the poverty line, including 12.5% of those under the age of eighteen and 32.0% of those 65 or over.

== Education ==
Residents are assigned to Union Parish Public Schools.
