= Kelly, Louisiana =

- Unincorporated community
- Location within Louisiana Location within the United States
- Coordinates: 31°58′51″N 92°10′36″W
- Country: United States
- State: Louisiana
- Parish: Caldwell
- Elevation: 118 ft (36 m)
- Time zone: UTC-6 (Central (CST))
  - Summer (DST): UTC-5 (CDT)
- ZIP code: 71441
- Area code: 318
- GNIS feature ID: 536160

Kelly is an unincorporated community in Caldwell Parish, Louisiana, United States. Its ZIP code is 71441.
