= Vienna, Louisiana =

- Town
- Location in Lincoln Parish, Louisiana

- Location of Louisiana in the United States
- Coordinates: 32°37′10″N 92°38′53″W
- Country: United States
- State: Louisiana
- Parish: Lincoln

Area
  - Total: 3.47 sq mi (8.98 km^{2})
  - Land: 3.47 sq mi (8.98 km^{2})
  - Water: 0 sq mi (0.00 km^{2})
- Elevation: 217 ft (66 m)

Population (2020)
  - Total: 483
  - Density: 139.3/sq mi (53.78/km^{2})
- Time zone: UTC-6 (CST)
  - Summer (DST): UTC-5 (CDT)
- Area code: 318
- FIPS code: 22-78540
- GNIS feature ID: 2406800

Vienna is a town in Lincoln Parish, Louisiana, United States. The population was 483 in 2020.

During the American Civil War, Confederate troops drilled at a new camp established in 1862 in Vienna. Later in the war, a parolee camp was established at Vienna.

Vienna was the parish seat of Lincoln Parish from its creation in 1873 until 1884, when a parish-wide vote moved it to the new railroad town of Ruston.

== History ==
Daniel Colvin settled near what is now Vienna in about 1812.

The Colvins operated a store or relay station of some kind. Their house was near the trail that led from Monroe to Shreveport. Jephthah (son of Daniel) opened the first post office in the region in 1838, originally known as Colvin's Post Office. The name was changed to Vienna in 1850.

Vienna was an overnight stop the stagecoaches on the Monroe-Shreveport Stagecoach Road (later called the Old Wire Road).

== Geography ==
Vienna is located in central Lincoln Parish. U.S. Routes 63 and 167 pass through the center of town together, leading south 5 miles (8 km) to Ruston, the parish seat, and north 17 miles (27 km) to Bernice. Vienna is 3.5 miles (5.6 km) north of Exit 85 on Interstate 20 in Ruston.

According to the United States Census Bureau, Vienna has a total area of 3.5 square miles (9.0 km^{2}), all land.

== Demographics ==
Historical population
Census	Pop.	Note	%±
1880	358		—
1970	59		—
1980	519		779.7%
1990	404		−22.2%
2000	424		5.0%
2010	386		−9.0%
2020	483		25.1%
2025 (est.)	475	▼	−1.7%
U.S. Decennial Census

Vienna racial composition as of 2020
Race	Number	Percentage
White (non-Hispanic)	406	84.06%
Black or African American (non-Hispanic)	21	4.35%
Asian	3	0.62%
Other/Mixed	24	4.97%
Hispanic or Latino	29	6.0%

As of the 2020 United States census, there were 483 people, 201 households, and 153 families residing in the town.
