= Truxno, Louisiana =

Coordinates: 32°56′51″N 92°24′22″W

Truxno is a village in Union Parish, Louisiana, United States. It sits at an elevation of 223 feet. The community sits at the intersection of Louisiana Highway 549 and Parish Road 6640. Bird's Chapel Cemetery lies approximately one mile to the northeast along Bird Chapel Road.

== Major highway ==
- Louisiana Highway 549
