= Union Parish School District =

School district in Louisiana, United States

Coordinates: 32.7936°N 92.3880°W

Address
- 1206 Marion Highway Farmerville, Louisiana, 71241; United States

District information
- Type: Public
- Grades: PreK–12
- NCES District ID: 2201770

Students and staff
- Students: 1,919 (2020–2021)
- Teachers: 104.15 (on an FTE basis)
- Staff: 124.84 (on an FTE basis)
- Student–teacher ratio: 18.43:1

Other information
- Website: unionparishschools.org

The Union Parish School District is a school district headquartered in Farmerville, Louisiana, United States. It operates under the governance of the Union Parish School Board and serves the Union Parish.

In the 2012–2013 school year, Union Parish public schools had the highest rate of improvement statewide in the annual end-of-course examinations administered in Algebra I and English II.

== Schools ==
=== High schools ===
- Union Parish High School, sometimes abbreviated as UPHS. (Farmerville)

•D’Arbonne Woods Charter School, sometimes abbreviated as DWCS. •Union Christian Academy, sometimes abbreviated as UCA.

=== Junior high schools ===
- Union Parish Junior High School, sometimes abbreviated as UPJH. (Farmerville)

Union Parish Junior High was originally named Farmerville Junior High, but was changed in 2014. The principal of this complex is currently Kristy Auger.

=== Elementary schools ===
- Farmerville Elementary School (Unincorporated area, located on Louisiana Highway 33)

== Former Schools ==
- Farmerville High School

== Notes ==
- Bernice and Downsville plan to close in preparation for the integration of a high school serving all of Union Parish.
- The district is known for having the oldest fleet of school buses in the state.
- The Union Parish High School football team won the 2013 3-A State Championship game on December 13, 2013, securing a 14–1 season with a 33–27 win against Livonia High School in their first state championship since 2001. The game was a memorial to Jaleel Gipson, who died earlier that year from injuries he sustained during a playoff at the age of 17.
