= Bonita, Louisiana =

- Village
- Location in Morehouse Parish, Louisiana

- Location of Louisiana in the United States
- Coordinates: 32°55′14″N 91°40′30″W
- Country: United States
- State: Louisiana
- Parish: Morehouse

Area
  - Total: 1.35 sq mi (3.49 km^{2})
  - Land: 1.35 sq mi (3.49 km^{2})
  - Water: 0 sq mi (0.00 km^{2})
- Elevation: 105 ft (32 m)

Population (2020)
  - Total: 170
  - Density: 126.0/sq mi (48.66/km^{2})
- Time zone: UTC-6 (CST)
  - Summer (DST): UTC-5 (CDT)
- Area code: 318
- FIPS code: 22-08535
- GNIS feature ID: 2407422

Bonita is a village in Morehouse Parish, Louisiana, United States. The population was 170 at the 2020 census, down from 284 in 2010.

== History ==
Not much is known about the early history of Bonita, but it is believed that the extension of the Missouri Pacific Railroad through Morehouse Parish in the 1890s is what triggered the establishment of the town. The construction of a post office around the same period solidifies this.

Bonita was incorporated as a village in 1901.

Six churches serve the small village: St. Mark Missionary Baptist Church, St. Luke Baptist Church, St. Joe Ame Church, the Bonita Church of God, Bonita Baptist Church, and Holy Ghost Disturbed Church.

== Geography ==
Bonita is located in northeastern Morehouse Parish. U.S. Route 165 passes through the village, leading southwest 12 miles (19 km) to Mer Rouge and 20 miles (32 km) to Bastrop, the parish seat, while to the northeast it leads 11 miles (18 km) to Wilmot, Arkansas.

According to the United States Census Bureau, Bonita has a total area of 1.35 square miles (3.50 km^{2}), all of it recorded as land. Bayou Bonne Idee winds through the east side of the village, running south to the Boeuf River east of Oak Ridge. It is part of the Ouachita River watershed.

== Demographics ==
Historical population
Census	Pop.	Note	%±
1910	273		—
1920	310		13.6%
1930	507		63.5%
1940	422		−16.8%
1950	504		19.4%
1960	574		13.9%
1970	533		−7.1%
1980	503		−5.6%
1990	265		−47.3%
2000	335		26.4%
2010	284		−15.2%
2020	170		−40.1%
2025 (est.)	159	▼	−6.5%
U.S. Decennial Census

=== 2020 census ===
Bonita village, Louisiana – Racial and ethnic composition Note: the US Census treats Hispanic/Latino as an ethnic category. This table excludes Latinos from the racial categories and assigns them to a separate category. Hispanics/Latinos may be of any race.
Race / Ethnicity (NH = Non-Hispanic)	Pop 2000	Pop 2010	Pop 2020	% 2000	% 2010	% 2020
White alone (NH)	143	87	55	42.69%	30.63%	32.35%
Black or African American alone (NH)	186	170	99	55.52%	59.86%	58.24%
Native American or Alaska Native alone (NH)	0	0	0	0.00%	0.00%	0.00%
Asian alone (NH)	1	5	1	0.30%	1.76%	0.59%
Native Hawaiian or Pacific Islander alone (NH)	0	0	0	0.00%	0.00%	0.00%
Other race alone (NH)	0	0	1	0.00%	0.00%	0.59%
Mixed race or Multiracial (NH)	0	1	4	0.00%	0.35%	2.35%
Hispanic or Latino (any race)	5	21	10	1.49%	7.39%	5.88%
Total	335	284	170	100.00%	100.00%	100.00%

== 2000 census ==
As of the census of 2000, there were 335 people, 122 households, and 87 families residing in the village. The population density was 247.0 inhabitants per square mile (95.4/km^{2}). There were 143 housing units at an average density of 105.4 per square mile (40.7/km^{2}). The racial makeup of the village was 42.69% White, 55.52% African American, 0.30% Asian, 1.49% from other races. Hispanic or Latino of any race were 1.49% of the population.

There were 122 households, out of which 30.3% had children under the age of 18 living with them, 50.0% were married couples living together, 16.4% had a female householder with no husband present, and 27.9% were non-families. 25.4% of all households were made up of individuals, and 14.8% had someone living alone who was 65 years of age or older. The average household size was 2.75 and the average family size was 3.35.

In the village, the population was spread out, with 26.9% under the age of 18, 8.7% from 18 to 24, 23.0% from 25 to 44, 22.4% from 45 to 64, and 19.1% who were 65 years of age or older. The median age was 39 years. For every 100 females, there were 92.5 males. For every 100 females age 18 and over, there were 91.4 males.

The median income for a household in the village was $22,727, and the median income for a family was $25,227. Males had a median income of $19,167 versus $19,688 for females. The per capita income for the village was $25,029. About 25.0% of families and 30.1% of the population were below the poverty line, including 37.6% of those under age 18 and 27.0% of those age 65 or over.
