= List of state highways in Louisiana (550–599) =

The following is a list of state highways in the U.S. state of Louisiana designated in the 550-599 range.

== Louisiana Highway 550 ==
Louisiana Highway 550
- Location: Union Parish
- Length: 18.89 mi (30.40 km)
- Existed: 1955–present

Louisiana Highway 550 (LA 550) runs 18.89 miles (30.40 km) in a north–south direction from LA 2 east of Bernice to the Arkansas state line north of Laran, Union Parish.

The route heads northeast from LA 2 and intersects LA 15 southeast of Spearsville. LA 550 then curves northward and passes through Laran before crossing the Arkansas state line. The road continues toward Hillsboro, Arkansas and US 82 as Union County Road 32. It is an undivided two-lane highway for its entire length.

The entire route is in Union Parish.

mi	km	Destinations	Notes
0.0	0.0	LA 2 – Bernice, Farmerville	Southern terminus
10.0	16.1	LA 15 – Spearsville, Farmerville	
18.9	30.4	CR 32 (Hillsboro Road) – Hillsboro	Northern terminus; continuation in Arkansas
1.000 mi = 1.609 km; 1.000 km = 0.621 mi

== Louisiana Highway 551 ==
Louisiana Highway 551
- Location: Marion–Oakland
- Length: 9.33 mi (15.02 km)
- Existed: 1955–present

Louisiana Highway 551 (LA 551) runs 9.33 miles (15.02 km) in a north–south direction from LA 33 in Marion to LA 549 in Oakland, Union Parish.

The route heads northwest out of Marion, traversing a rural area and skirting the northeast side of the Union Wildlife Management Area. Its northern terminus at LA 549 is located 1.08 miles (1.74 km) south of the Arkansas state line. LA 551 is an undivided two-lane highway for its entire length.

== Louisiana Highway 552 ==
Louisiana Highway 552
- Location: Union Parish
- Length: 12.27 mi (19.75 km)

Louisiana Highway 552 (LA 552) runs 12.27 miles (19.75 km) in Union Parish.

== Louisiana Highway 553 ==
Louisiana Highway 553
- Location: Monroe–Sterlington
- Length: 12.82 mi (20.63 km)
- Existed: 1955–present

Louisiana Highway 553 (LA 553) runs 12.82 miles (20.63 km) in a north–south direction from US 165 in Monroe to LA 2 in Sterlington, Ouachita Parish.

== Louisiana Highway 554 ==
Louisiana Highway 554
- Location: Perryville–Collinston
- Length: 8.02 mi (12.91 km)
- Existed: 1955–present

Louisiana Highway 554 (LA 554) runs 8.02 miles (12.91 km) in an east–west direction from a junction with US 165 and LA 2 at Perryville to LA 138 southwest of Collinston.

The western terminus at US 165 and LA 2 is located on the Ouachita–Morehouse parish line. From this point, the route heads eastward through Ouachita Parish for 2.6 miles (4.2 km) before crossing Little Bayou Boeuf into Morehouse Parish. LA 554 intersects LA 139, which connects to Monroe and Bastrop. It continues eastward then makes a sharp curve to the south near its eastern terminus at LA 138. LA 554 is an undivided two-lane highway for its entire length.

Parish	Location	mi	km	Destinations	Notes
Ouachita–Morehouse parish line	Perryville	0.0	0.0	US 165 / LA 2 – Monroe, Bastrop	Western terminus
Morehouse		4.9	7.9	LA 139 (Old Monroe Road) – Monroe, Bastrop	
Morehouse		8.0	12.9	LA 138 (Doss Highway) – Collinston, Monroe	Eastern terminus
1.000 mi = 1.609 km; 1.000 km = 0.621 mi

== Louisiana Highway 555 ==
Louisiana Highway 555
- Location: Franklin Parish
- Length: 12.38 mi (19.92 km)

Louisiana Highway 555 (LA 555) runs 12.38 miles (19.92 km) in Franklin Parish.

== Louisiana Highway 556 ==
Louisiana Highway 556
- Location: Choudrant–Indian Village
- Length: 8.05 mi (12.96 km)

Louisiana Highway 556 (LA 556) runs 8.05 miles (12.96 km) from Choudrant to Indian Village.

== Louisiana Highway 557 ==
Louisiana Highway 557
- Location: Vixen–Summit
- Length: 14.72 mi (23.69 km)

Louisiana Highway 557 (LA 557) runs 14.72 miles (23.69 km) from Vixen to Summit.

== Louisiana Highway 558 ==
Louisiana Highway 558
- Location: Mount Union–Lockhart
- Length: 5.94 mi (9.56 km)
- Existed: 1955–present

Louisiana Highway 558 (LA 558) runs 5.94 miles (9.56 km) in a north–south direction along Iron Mountain Road from LA 15 in Mount Union to the Arkansas state line at Lockhart, Union Parish.

The route heads north from LA 15 at a point about 2.0 miles (3.2 km) east of Spearsville. Just before crossing the state line, LA 558 intersects LA 3121 in Lockhart. It continues toward El Dorado, Arkansas and US 167 as Arkansas Highway 7. LA 558 is an undivided two-lane highway for its entire length.

The entire highway is in Union Parish.

Location	mi	km	Destinations	Notes
Mount Union	0.0	0.0	LA 15 – Spearsville, Farmerville	Southern terminus
Lockhart	5.6	9.0	LA 3121 – Taylortown	Northern terminus of LA 3121
Lockhart	6.0	9.7	AR 7 north – El Dorado	Northern terminus; continuation in Arkansas
1.000 mi = 1.609 km; 1.000 km = 0.621 mi

== Louisiana Highway 559 ==
Louisiana Highway 559
- Location: Enterprise–Columbia
- Length: 13.83 mi (22.26 km)

Louisiana Highway 559 (LA 559) runs 13.83 miles (22.26 km) from Enterprise to Columbia.

== Louisiana Highway 560 ==
Louisiana Highway 560
- Location: Jefferson Parish
- Length: 1.03 mi (1.66 km)
- Existed: 1955–present

Louisiana Highway 560 (LA 560) is a collection of two current and two former state-maintained streets in Marrero and Crown Point, Jefferson Parish. All four routes were established with the 1955 Louisiana Highway renumbering.

== Louisiana Highway 561 ==
Louisiana Highway 561
- Location: Hebert–Richland Parish
- Length: 11.78 mi (18.96 km)

Louisiana Highway 561 (LA 561) runs 11.78 miles (18.96 km) from Hebert to Richland Parish.

== Louisiana Highway 562 ==
Louisiana Highway 562
- Location: Fort Necessity–Wisner
- Length: 26.80 mi (43.13 km)

Louisiana Highway 562 (LA 562) runs 26.80 miles (43.13 km) from Fort Necessity to Wisner.

== Louisiana Highway 563 ==
Louisiana Highway 563
- Location: Simsboro
- Length: 13.38 mi (21.53 km)

Louisiana Highway 563 (LA 563) runs 13.38 miles (21.53 km) in Simsboro.

== Louisiana Highway 564 ==
Louisiana Highway 564
- Location: Catahoula Parish
- Length: 4.86 mi (7.82 km)

Louisiana Highway 564 (LA 564) runs 4.86 miles (7.82 km) in Catahoula Parish.

== Louisiana Highway 565 ==
Louisiana Highway 565
- Location: Wildsville–Deer Park
- Length: 28.54 mi (45.93 km)

Louisiana Highway 565 (LA 565) runs 28.54 miles (45.93 km) from Wildsville to Deer Park.

== Louisiana Highway 566 ==
Louisiana Highway 566
- Location: Elkhorn–Clayton
- Length: 30.09 mi (48.43 km)
- Existed: 1955–present

Louisiana Highway 566 (LA 566) runs 30.09 miles (48.43 km) in a southwest to northeast direction from US 84 at Elkhorn, Concordia Parish to a junction with LA 568 and LA 570 south of Waterproof, Tensas Parish.

The route heads northward from US 84 and follows Brushy Bayou for about 3.0 miles (4.8 km). It then curves slightly northeast to a point on the Tensas River known as Dunbarton. LA 566 turns east and roughly follows the river into the town of Clayton. Here, it intersects the concurrent US 425 and LA 15 at the foot of a twin bridge across the Tensas River. LA 566 curves to the north with the river and crosses from Concordia Parish into Tensas Parish.

Soon after crossing the parish line, LA 566 intersects LA 571, the route of which follows a semi-circle west of Waterproof. LA 566 turns to the southeast at a second intersection with LA 571 and passes through Troy to a point on US 65 and LA 568 just southwest of Waterproof. LA 566 officially proceeds with LA 568 a short distance further to an intersection with LA 570, but this portion of the route is signed in the field only as LA 568.

== Louisiana Highway 567 ==
Louisiana Highway 567
- Location: Lee Bayou
- Length: 3.26 mi (5.25 km)

Louisiana Highway 567 (LA 567) runs 3.26 miles (5.25 km) in Lee Bayou.

== Louisiana Highway 568 ==
Louisiana Highway 568
- Location: Ferriday–Avondale
- Length: 32.5 mi (52.3 km)

Louisiana Highway 568 (LA 568) runs 32.5 miles (52.3 km) from Ferriday to Avondale.

== Louisiana Highway 569 ==
Louisiana Highway 569
- Location: Spokane–Lake St. John
- Length: 12.24 mi (19.70 km)

Louisiana Highway 569 (LA 569) runs 12.24 miles (19.70 km) from Spokane to Lake St. John.

== Louisiana Highway 570 ==
Louisiana Highway 570
- Location: Waterproof
- Length: 4.16 mi (6.69 km)

Louisiana Highway 570 (LA 570) runs 4.16 miles (6.69 km) in Waterproof.

== Louisiana Highway 571 ==
Louisiana Highway 571
- Location: Tensas Parish
- Length: 12.13 mi (19.52 km)
- Existed: 1955–present

Louisiana Highway 571 (LA 571) runs 12.13 miles (19.52 km) in a southwest to northeast semi-circle from LA 566 north of Clayton to a second junction with LA 566 west of Waterproof, Tensas Parish.

== Louisiana Highway 572 ==
Louisiana Highway 572
- Location: Gilbert–Talbot Landing
- Length: 10.33 mi (16.62 km)

Louisiana Highway 572 (LA 572) runs 10.33 miles (16.62 km) from Gilbert to Talbot Landing.

== Louisiana Highway 573 ==
Louisiana Highway 573
- Location: Goldman–Saranac
- Length: 21.35 mi (34.36 km)

Louisiana Highway 573 (LA 573) runs 21.35 miles (34.36 km) from Goldman to Saranac.

== Louisiana Highway 574 ==
Louisiana Highway 574
- Location: Grand Isle
- Length: 2.72 mi (4.38 km)
- Existed: 1955–present

Louisiana Highway 574 (LA 574) runs 2.72 miles (4.38 km) in Grand Isle.

== Louisiana Highway 575 ==
Louisiana Highway 575
- Location: Newellton–Somerset
- Length: 14.82 mi (23.85 km)

Louisiana Highway 575 (LA 575) runs 14.82 miles (23.85 km) from Newellton to Somerset.

== Louisiana Highway 576 ==
Louisiana Highway 576
- Location: Charlieville–Mangham
- Length: 17.08 mi (27.49 km)

Louisiana Highway 576 (LA 576) runs 17.08 miles (27.49 km) from Charlieville to Mangham.

== Louisiana Highway 577 ==
Louisiana Highway 577
- Location: Baskin–Darnell
- Length: 61.20 mi (98.49 km)

Louisiana Highway 577 (LA 577) runs 61.20 miles (98.49 km) from Baskin to Darnell.

== Louisiana Highway 578 ==
Louisiana Highway 578
- Location: Crowville
- Length: 7.71 mi (12.41 km)

Louisiana Highway 578 (LA 578) runs 7.71 miles (12.41 km) from Crowville.

== Louisiana Highway 579 ==
Louisiana Highway 579
- Location: Waverly–Monticello
- Length: 12.86 mi (20.70 km)

Louisiana Highway 579 (LA 579) runs 12.86 miles (20.70 km) from Waverly to Monticello.

== Louisiana Highway 580 ==
Louisiana Highway 580
- Location: Monticello–Alsatia
- Length: 12.30 mi (19.79 km)

Louisiana Highway 580 (LA 580) runs 12.30 miles (19.79 km) from Monticello to Alsatia.

== Louisiana Highway 581 ==
Louisiana Highway 581
- Location: Waddell–Transylvania
- Length: 6.94 mi (11.17 km)

Louisiana Highway 581 (LA 581) runs 6.94 miles (11.17 km) from Waddell to Transylvania.

== Louisiana Highway 582 ==
Louisiana Highway 582
- Location: Redwing–Lake Providence
- Length: 16.93 mi (27.25 km)

Louisiana Highway 582 (LA 582) runs 16.93 miles (27.25 km) from Redwing to Lake Providence.

== Louisiana Highway 583 ==
Louisiana Highway 583
- Location: Bee Bayou–Hegwood Island
- Length: 10.47 mi (16.85 km)

Louisiana Highway 583 (LA 583) runs 10.47 miles (16.85 km) from Bee Bayou to Hegwood Island.

== Louisiana Highway 584 ==
Louisiana Highway 584
- Location: Richland Parish
- Length: 8.01 mi (12.89 km)
- Existed: 1955–present

Louisiana Highway 584 (LA 584) runs 8.01 miles (12.89 km) in an east–west direction from LA 135 to a point just east of LA 3048 in an area south of Rayville, Richland Parish.

== Louisiana Highway 585 ==
Louisiana Highway 585
- Location: Richland Parish–Gassoway
- Length: 46.48 mi (74.80 km)
- Existed: 1955–present

Louisiana Highway 585 (LA 585) runs 46.48 miles (74.80 km) in a southwest to northeast direction from LA 134 west of Epps, Richland Parish to US 65 at Gassoway, East Carroll Parish.

The route heads due north from LA 134 and crosses from Richland Parish into West Carroll Parish. It then zigzags northward across LA 2 at Goodwill to a point on the Boeuf River west of Oak Grove. It then zigzags east and north to Fiske, where it begins to take a winding course parallel to the Boeuf River to LA 835 near Concord. LA 585 curves eastward to Kilbourne, where it intersects LA 17 just south of the Arkansas state line. The highway proceeds east across Bayou Macon into East Carroll Parish to its terminus at US 65 near Gassoway Lake.

== Louisiana Highway 586 ==
Louisiana Highway 586
- Location: Concord–Terry
- Length: 7.00 mi (11.27 km)

Louisiana Highway 586 (LA 586) runs 7.00 miles (11.27 km) from Concord to Terry.

== Louisiana Highway 587 ==
Louisiana Highway 587
- Location: Oak Grove
- Length: 4.63 mi (7.45 km)

Louisiana Highway 587 (LA 587) runs 4.63 miles (7.45 km) in Oak Grove.

== Louisiana Highway 588 ==
Louisiana Highway 588
- Location: East Carroll Parish
- Length: 17.40 mi (28.00 km)

Louisiana Highway 588 (LA 588) runs 17.40 miles (28.00 km) in East Carroll Parish.

== Louisiana Highway 589 ==
Louisiana Highway 589
- Location: East Carroll Parish
- Length: 12.99 mi (20.91 km)

Louisiana Highway 589 (LA 589) runs 12.99 miles (20.91 km) in East Carroll Parish.

== Louisiana Highway 590 ==
Louisiana Highway 590
- Location: Morehouse Parish
- Length: 5.85 mi (9.41 km)

Louisiana Highway 590 (LA 590) runs 5.85 miles (9.41 km) in Morehouse Parish.

== Louisiana Highway 591 ==
Louisiana Highway 591
- Location: Morehouse Parish
- Length: 9.04 mi (14.55 km)

Louisiana Highway 591 (LA 591) runs 9.04 miles (14.55 km) in Morehouse Parish.

== Louisiana Highway 592 ==
Louisiana Highway 592
- Location: Bastrop
- Length: 3.88 mi (6.24 km)

Louisiana Highway 592 (LA 592) runs 3.88 miles (6.24 km) in Bastrop.

== Louisiana Highway 593 ==
Louisiana Highway 593
- Location: Collinston–Bastrop
- Length: 17.23 mi (27.73 km)
- Existed: 1955–present

Louisiana Highway 593 (LA 593) runs 17.23 miles (27.73 km) in a north–south direction from LA 138 in Collinston to US 425 north of Bastrop.

The route heads northwest from Collinston and shortly intersects LA 3079. It travels through sparsely populated areas until passing just west of the Morehouse Memorial Airport, entering the city of Bastrop. LA 593 intersects LA 139, and the two highways run concurrently into the center of town, becoming a one-way couplet at the Morehouse General Hospital. A few blocks later, LA 593 intersects the one-way couplet of US 165/US 425/LA 2, ending its concurrency with LA 139 and beginning one with US 425. The one-way couplet ends two blocks to the north, and LA 593 splits from US 425 soon afterward. North of town, LA 593 passes by the Morehouse Country Club, the Georgia Pacific Wildlife Management Area, and Bussy Brake, all to the west of the road. LA 593 loops back to the east and ends at a final junction with US 425.

The entire highway is in Morehouse Parish.

Location	mi	km	Destinations	Notes
Collinston	0.0	0.0	LA 138	Southern terminus
	1.4	2.3	LA 3079	Western terminus of LA 3079
Bastrop	5.2	8.4	LA 830-5	Southern terminus of LA 830-5
Bastrop	5.8	9.3	LA 139 south	South end of LA 139 concurrency
Bastrop	6.8	10.9	US 165 / US 425 south / LA 2 / LA 139	North end of LA 139 concurrency; south end of US 425 concurrency
Bastrop	7.2	11.6	LA 830-1	Eastern terminus
Bastrop	7.7	12.4	US 425 north	North end of US 425 concurrency
	17.4	28.0	US 425	Northern terminus
1.000 mi = 1.609 km; 1.000 km = 0.621 mi: Concurrency terminus

== Louisiana Highway 594 ==
Louisiana Highway 594
- Location: Monroe–Swartz
- Length: 13.54 mi (21.79 km)
- Existed: 1955–present

Louisiana Highway 594 (LA 594) runs 13.54 miles (21.79 km) in a general southwest to northeast direction from LA 15 in Monroe to LA 139 in Swartz, Ouachita Parish.

LA 594 initially heads northeast on Texas Avenue from LA 15, near the latter's intersection with US 165 Business. The highway crosses over I-20 and immediately intersects 18th Street, connecting to a tight diamond interchange with the interstate. LA 594 turns to the east parallel with I-20 and intersects mainline US 165 near the Pecanland Mall. After a few miles, LA 594 reaches Millhaven and turns due north. It intersects US 80 as it passes Ouachita Parish High School and continues north through Swartz to its terminus at LA 139.

LA 594 is an undivided two-lane highway for its entire length.

The entire highway is in Ouachita Parish.

Location	mi	km	Destinations	Notes
Monroe	0.0	0.0	LA 15	Southwestern terminus
Monroe	0.6– 0.9	0.97– 1.4	To I-20 – Shreveport, Vicksburg via 18th Street	Exit 117B on I-20
Monroe	1.8	2.9	US 165	
	9.2	14.8	US 80	
Swartz	13.5	21.7	LA 139	Northeastern terminus
1.000 mi = 1.609 km; 1.000 km = 0.621 mi

== Louisiana Highway 595 ==
Louisiana Highway 595
- Location: Richland Parish
- Length: 3.41 mi (5.49 km)
- Existed: 1955–present

Louisiana Highway 595 (LA 595) runs 3.41 miles (5.49 km) in a north–south direction from a junction with US 80 and LA 133 in Start to the Richland–Morehouse parish line.

The route heads north from the concurrent US 80 and LA 133 in Start, a small community in northwestern Richland Parish. After curving westward, LA 595 turns north at a T-intersection with a local road. State maintenance ends at a bridge over Bayou Lafourche, which forms the boundary between Richland Parish and Morehouse Parish. LA 595 is an undivided two-lane highway for its entire length.

The entire highway is in Richland Parish.

Location	mi	km	Destinations	Notes
Start	0.0	0.0	US 80 / LA 133 – Monroe, Tallulah	Southern terminus
	3.4	5.5	End state maintenance at Bayou Lafourche bridge	Northern terminus
1.000 mi = 1.609 km; 1.000 km = 0.621 mi

== Louisiana Highway 596 ==
Louisiana Highway 596
- Location: Lake Providence–Panola
- Length: 10.70 mi (17.22 km)
- Existed: 1955–present

Louisiana Highway 596 (LA 596) runs 10.70 miles (17.22 km) in a north–south direction from US 65 in Lake Providence to a second junction with US 65 at Panola, East Carroll Parish.

== Louisiana Highway 597 ==
Louisiana Highway 597
- Location: Forest
- Length: 2.04 mi (3.28 km)

Louisiana Highway 597 (LA 597) runs 2.04 miles (3.28 km) in Forest.

== Louisiana Highway 599 ==
Louisiana Highway 599
- Location: Morehouse Parish
- Length: 13.14 mi (21.15 km)

Louisiana Highway 599 (LA 599) runs 13.14 miles (21.15 km) in Morehouse Parish.
