= Louisiana Highway 139 =

Highway in Louisiana

Louisiana Highway 139

- Route of LA 139 highlighted in red

Route information
- Maintained by Louisiana DOTD
- Length: 20.203 mi (32.514 km)
- Existed: 1955 renumbering–present

Major junctions
- South end: US 80 in Monroe
- LA 134 southeast of Sterlington
- North end: US 165 / US 425 / LA 2 / LA 593 in Bastrop

Location
- Country: United States
- State: Louisiana
- Parishes: Ouachita, Morehouse

Highway system
- Louisiana State Highway System; Interstate; US; State; Scenic
← LA 138	→ LA 140

Louisiana Highway 139 (LA 139) is a state highway located in northeastern Louisiana. It runs 20.20 miles (32.51 km) in a north–south direction from U.S. Highway 80 (US 80) in Monroe to the junction of US 165, US 425, LA 2, and LA 593 in Bastrop.

The route is one of two connecting Monroe and Bastrop, the seats of Ouachita Parish and Morehouse Parish, respectively. It runs parallel to US 165 and traverses the eastern suburbs of Monroe, skirting the east bank of Bayou DeSiard. North of Swartz, LA 139 travels through rural surroundings until reaching Bastrop, where it serves as the main north–south thoroughfare on the south side of town.

LA 139 was designated in the 1955 Louisiana Highway renumbering from a portion of former State Route 14. It also served as the original alignment of US 165 from 1926 until its re-routing in 1937. As originally designated, LA 139 continued north from Bastrop to the Arkansas state line along the pre-1955 State Route 204. In 1989, this portion was transferred to the newly created US 425, shortening the route of LA 139 by almost 17 miles (27 km).

== Route description ==
From the south, LA 139 begins at a junction with US 80, continuing the route of DeSiard Street outside of the Monroe city limits. LA 139 heads northeast on Old Bastrop Road as an undivided four-lane highway with a center turning lane through the Lakeshore suburb situated along Bayou DeSiard. After a short distance, the local name changes to Lincoln Road until reaching an area known as Frizzell Spur, where the center lane is discontinued. LA 139 continues northeast through Swartz as the suburban development becomes more sparse and intersects LA 594. Here, the highway narrows to two lanes, and the surroundings become increasingly rural. Four miles (6.4 km) later, LA 139 curves northward and begins a concurrency with LA 134, which connects with Oak Ridge to the east. After less than three miles (4.8 km), LA 134 departs to the west toward Fairbanks, and LA 139 crosses Little Bayou Boeuf from Ouachita Parish into Morehouse Parish.

In Morehouse Parish, LA 139 becomes known as Old Monroe Road and intersects LA 554 (Perryville Road), connecting with the nearby small communities of Collinston and Perryville. Five miles (8.0 km) later, LA 139 enters the Bastrop city limits at Naff Avenue and continues onto South Washington Street. Widening again to an undivided, four-lane highway, LA 139 intersects LA 593 (Collinston Road), and the two highways proceed into town concurrently. Soon after crossing underneath the Arkansas, Louisiana and Mississippi Railroad (ALM) line, LA 139/LA 539 transitions onto the one-way couplet of South Franklin Street (northbound) and South Washington Street (southbound) in the downtown area, effectively becoming a divided four-lane highway. Over the next three blocks, the highway passes the Morehouse Parish jail and sheriff's office complexes before reaching the city's courthouse square. This marks the northern terminus of LA 139 and consists of a junction with the concurrent US 165/LA 2, which passes through town on the one-way couplet of Jefferson Avenue (eastbound) and Madison Avenue (westbound). Additionally, US 425 follows US 165/LA 2 eastward from the courthouse square and continues the route of LA 139 northward, briefly maintaining the concurrency with LA 593. The various routes intersecting in the center of Bastrop connect to such nearby communities as Mer Rouge, Oak Ridge, and Sterlington.

=== Route classification and data ===
LA 139 is classified by the Louisiana Department of Transportation and Development (La DOTD) as an urban minor arterial from Monroe to Swartz and within Bastrop. The middle portion of the route is classified as a rural major collector. Daily traffic volume in 2013 peaked at 18,100 vehicles in the suburbs northeast of Monroe and 10,900 vehicles in Bastrop. The rural portions of the route averaged between 3,100 and 4,800 vehicles daily. The posted speed limit is generally 55 mph (90 km/h) in rural areas, reduced to 45 mph (70 km/h) between Monroe and Swartz and to 35 mph (55 km/h) in Bastrop.

== History ==
In the original Louisiana Highway system in use between 1921 and 1955, LA 139 was part of State Route 14. Five years after its designation, Route 14 was chosen as the alignment of US 165 between Alexandria and the Arkansas state line when the U.S. Highway system was implemented in 1926. Route 14 remained entirely co-signed with US 165 until the latter was moved onto a newer alignment between Monroe and Bastrop in 1937. When the Louisiana Department of Highways renumbered the state highway system in 1955, unnecessary concurrencies between state and U.S. highways were eliminated. Only the portion of Route 14 no longer concurrent with US 165 retained a separate state designation, as LA 139. (Note: An unrelated State Route 139 in Pointe Coupee Parish existed in the original state highway system. It was designated in 1926 and became part of LA 413 and LA 414 in the 1955 renumbering.)

Class "A": La 139—From a junction with La-US 165 at or near Bastrop through or near Log Cabin to the Arkansas State Line south of Hamburg, Arkansas.
Class "B": La 139—From a junction with La-US 80 at or near Sicard through or near Wham to a junction with La-US 165 at or near Bastrop.

— 1955 legislative route description

With the 1955 renumbering, the state highway department initially categorized all routes into three classes: "A" (primary), "B" (secondary), and "C" (farm-to-market). This system has since been updated and replaced by a more specific functional classification system.

As the original route description indicates, LA 139 once extended northward from Bastrop to the Arkansas state line en route to Hamburg. This alignment made up the entirety of pre-1955 State Route 204 and was part of LA 139 from the 1955 renumbering until being transferred to the newly designated US 425 in 1989. This shortened the designation of LA 139 by almost 17 miles (27 km).

== Major intersections ==
Parish	Location	mi	km	Destinations	Notes
Ouachita	Monroe	0.000	0.000	US 80 (DeSiard Street) – Monroe, Rayville	Southern terminus; location also known as Sicard
Ouachita	Swartz	4.529	7.289	LA 594	Northern terminus of LA 594
Ouachita	Wham	8.667	13.948	LA 134 east – Oak Ridge, Collinston	South end of LA 134 concurrency
Ouachita		11.316	18.211	LA 134 west – Fairbanks	North end of LA 134 concurrency
Morehouse		13.719	22.079	LA 554 (Perryville Road) – Collinston, Perryville	
Morehouse	Bastrop	19.165	30.843	LA 593 south (Collinston Road) – Collinston, Oak Ridge	South end of LA 593 concurrency
Morehouse	Bastrop	20.136– 20.203	32.406– 32.514	US 165 north / US 425 south / LA 2 east (East Jefferson Avenue, East Madison Avenue) – Mer Rouge, Oak Ridge US 165 south / LA 2 west (West Madison Avenue, West Jefferson Avenue) – Sterlington, Monroe US 425 north / LA 593 north – Chemin-A-Haut State Park	Northern terminus; north end of LA 593 concurrency; junction of one-way pairs
1.000 mi = 1.609 km; 1.000 km = 0.621 mi: Concurrency terminus
