= Julice Mound =

Archaeological site in Louisiana, United States

- Location within Louisiana today
- 32°41′19.5″N 91°13′2.4″W
- Cultures: Plaquemine Mississippian culture
- Location: Transylvania, Louisiana, East Carroll Parish, Louisiana, USA
- Region: East Carroll Parish, Louisiana

History
- Built: 1200 CE
- Abandoned: 1541 CE

Julice Mound is an archaeological site in East Carroll Parish, Louisiana with a Plaquemine culture component dating to 1200–1541 CE and located less than one mile from Transylvania Mounds.

== Description ==
The site is located less than a mile from Transylvania Mounds and it is extremely likely that Julice is part of that complex. The site has a single platform mound and is located near a channel that feeds into the Mississippi River and right next to Louisiana Highway 581. A survey from 1954 describes it as being 8 feet (2.4 m) in height and having a small platform on its summit. The route for HWY 581 runs over the former location of a large section of the mound, of which only about one third remains and recent measurements of the mound put it at 9 feet (2.7 m) in height and 130 feet (40 m) by 65 feet (20 m) at its base. Pottery discovered at the site date its occupation to 1200–1541 CE.

== See also ==
- Culture, phase, and chronological table for the Mississippi Valley
