= Louisiana Highway 138 =

State highway in Louisiana, United States

Louisiana Highway 138

- Route of LA 138 highlighted in red

Route information
- Maintained by Louisiana DOTD
- Length: 12.740 mi (20.503 km)
- Existed: 1955 renumbering–present

Major junctions
- South end: LA 134 south of Collinston
- North end: US 165 / US 425 / LA 2 in Mer Rouge

Location
- Country: United States
- State: Louisiana
- Parishes: Morehouse

Highway system
- Louisiana State Highway System; Interstate; US; State; Scenic
← LA 137	→ LA 139
← SR C-1556	C-1557	→ SR C-1558

Louisiana Highway 138 (LA 138) is a state highway located in Morehouse Parish, Louisiana. It runs 12.74 miles (20.50 km) in a north–south direction from LA 134 south of Collinston to a junction with U.S. Highway 165 (US 165), U.S. Highway 425 (US 425), and LA 2 in Mer Rouge.

A largely rural route, LA 138 connects the small villages of Collinston and Mer Rouge, located northeast of Monroe. Its southern terminus (LA 134) leads to Monroe in neighboring Ouachita Parish, as well as the village of Oak Ridge in southern Morehouse Parish. The northern terminus is located at the east end of the concurrency of US 165 and US 425. The two highways split toward Monroe and the Arkansas state line, respectively, after heading west into Bastrop, the parish seat.

== Route description ==
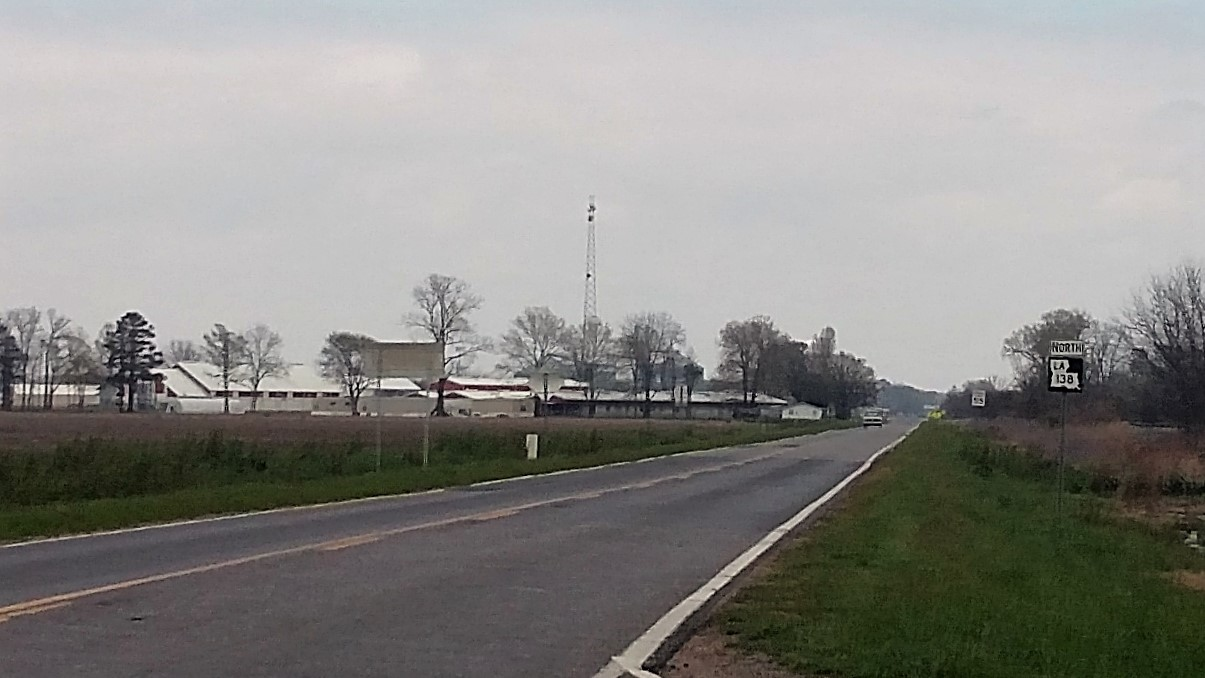
LA 138 near the junction with LA 3051

From the south, LA 138 begins at an intersection with LA 134 (Coulee Swamp Road) in southern Morehouse Parish. LA 134 connects to the city of Monroe on the southwest and the village of Oak Ridge on the east. LA 138 proceeds northward along Doss Highway through rural farmland and crosses the Union Pacific Railroad tracks at a point known as Windsor. 1.7 miles (2.7 km) later, LA 138 intersects LA 554 (Perryville Road), which heads west to US 165 between Monroe and Bastrop. Here, the highway curves to the northeast and heads into Collinston.

LA 138 runs through Collinston on Main Street, first curving due east, then making a zigzag at Keller Drive. Two blocks later, LA 138 reaches the UPRR tracks and turns to the north, passing by the city hall and museum. It then makes a second crossing over the UPRR and intersects LA 593 at the north end of town. While LA 593 heads northwest toward Bastrop, the parish seat, LA 138 curves to the northeast and soon begins to parallel the UPRR tracks. Heading through rural farmland once again, LA 138 intersects LA 3079 (Charles Dickerson Lane), a short connector to LA 593. 3.1 miles (5.0 km) later, LA 138 intersects LA 3051 (Grabault Road), another connection to Bastrop. Continuing northeast, LA 138 passes by a local school, followed by a succession of industrial plants just outside Mer Rouge.

LA 138 enters Mer Rouge on South 14th Street, still running alongside the UPRR tracks. The route proceeds for 0.5 miles (0.80 km) before ending at an intersection with Davenport Avenue, the village's main street, which is part of US 165, US 425, and LA 2. From this intersection, the three highways proceed west concurrently into Bastrop and split toward Bonita (US 165 north), Oak Ridge (US 425 south), and Oak Grove (LA 2 east).

The route is classified as a rural major collector by the Louisiana Department of Transportation and Development (La DOTD). The posted speed limit is generally 55 mph (90 km/h) between points, reduced to 25 mph (40 km/h) through Collinston and 35 mph (55 km/h) through Mer Rouge. Average daily traffic volume in 2013 ranges between 770 and 940 vehicles from the southern terminus through Collinston. The segment between Collinston and Mer Rouge has a high count of 4,300 vehicles, falling off to 1,480 through Mer Rouge to the northern terminus. LA 138 is an undivided two-lane highway for its entire length.

== History ==
=== Pre-1955 route numbering ===
In the original Louisiana Highway system in use between 1921 and 1955, the modern LA 138 was originally part of two separate state highways, State Route 47 and State Route C-1557.

==== Southern section ====
State Route 47 followed the route from the southern terminus to the current junction with LA 593 in Collinston, where it turned northwest into Bastrop. Route 47 was designated by an act of the state legislature in 1921, but it was originally projected to follow a direct path from Oak Ridge to Collinston along the former Missouri Pacific Railroad line. Once the road was actually constructed around 1935, its location had been changed to head west from Oak Ridge along the current route of LA 134 for 5.9 miles (9.5 km), then north along LA 138 into Collinston. The route then remained the same until the 1955 Louisiana Highway renumbering.

==== Northern section ====
State Route C-1557
- Location: Morehouse Parish
- Length: 7.2 mi (11.6 km)
- Existed: c1940–1955

In the original Louisiana Highway system, the northern section of LA 138 from Collinston to Mer Rouge was designated as State Route C-1557. This route was a pre-existing highway that was added to the system around 1940, and it remained the same until the 1955 renumbering.

=== Post-1955 route history ===
LA 138 was created in the 1955 renumbering following the portion of former State Route 47 from a point west of Oak Ridge through Collinston, as well as the entirety of former State Route C-1557.

La 138—From a junction with La 134 near Windsor through or near Collinston to a junction with La-US 165 at or near Mer Rouge.

— 1955 legislative route description

The route of LA 138 has remained the same to the present day. However, the northern terminus was originally a junction with US 165 and LA 2 only. In 2005, US 425 was extended south over existing highways from Bastrop to Natchez, Mississippi. US 425 now runs concurrent with US 165 and LA 2 eastward into Mer Rouge, intersecting LA 138 immediately before turning south over the route of LA 133 toward Oak Ridge.

== Major intersections ==
The entire highway is in Morehouse Parish.

Location	mi	km	Destinations	Notes
	0.000	0.000	LA 134 (Coulee Swamp Road) – Oak Ridge, Monroe	Southern terminus
	3.676	5.916	LA 554 (Perryville Road)	Eastern terminus of LA 554
Collinston	5.526– 5.595	8.893– 9.004	LA 593 (Collinston Road) – Bastrop	Southern terminus of LA 593
	7.103	11.431	LA 3079 (Charles Dickerson Lane)	Eastern terminus of LA 3079
	10.237	16.475	LA 3051 (Grabault Road)	To Horseshoe Lake
Mer Rouge	12.740	20.503	US 165 south / US 425 / LA 2 (Davenport Avenue) – Bastrop, Oak Grove US 165 north (North 14th Street) – Bonita	Northern terminus
1.000 mi = 1.609 km; 1.000 km = 0.621 mi
