= Gassoway Lake =

Lake in the United States of America

- Location within Louisiana Location within the United States
- Location: East Carroll Parish, Louisiana
- Coordinates: 32°59′N 91°13′W
- Type: Floodplain lake
- Basin countries: United States
- Surface area: 1.25 sq mi (3.2 km^{2})
- Surface elevation: 105 ft (32 m)

Gassoway Lake is a small freshwater lake located in East Carroll Parish, Louisiana near the unincorporated community of Gassoway. It is a floodplain lake that is frequently mistaken for an oxbow lake.

== History ==
The site that eventually became the lake was farmland or woodland as of 1812. It formed by floodwaters from the Mississippi River and was gradually separated from the river by overbank sedimentation between 1881 and 1913. The lake lacks the typical shape, narrow neck, natural levee, depth, and bed elevation of oxbow lakes.

In 2003, a landmark state water rights case, Parm v. Shumate centered on Gassoway Lake and the right to utilize the lake by the public for fishing during seasonal floods which occasionally connected the lake to the Mississippi River. The courts determined that the lake did not meet requirements for navigability, and that it, and similar riparian land, could not be used by the public for fishing or other recreational purposes. The state ruling was upheld by the United States Court of Appeals for the Fifth Circuit.

== Location ==
Gassoway Lake is located in the extreme north-east part of the state about 3 miles (4.8 km) west of the Mississippi River, and 2,400 feet (730 m) from the state border with Arkansas. It is approximately 1.5 square miles (3.9 km^{2}) in size and is about 1.25 by .5 miles (2.01 by 0.80 km).

The lake is shallow, and often holds water only seasonally.
