= Arkansas Highway 81 =

State highway in Arkansas, United States

Highway 81
- AR 81 in red, AR 81S in blue

Route information
- Maintained by ArDOT
- Length: 2.29 mi (3.69 km)
- Existed: c. 1945–present

Major junctions
- South end: US 65 / US 425 near Pine Bluff
- North end: US 63 / US 79 near Pine Bluff

Location
- Country: United States
- State: Arkansas
- Counties: Jefferson

Highway system
- Arkansas Highway System; Interstate; US; State; Business; Spurs; Suffixed; Scenic; Heritage
← AR 80	→ US 82

Arkansas Highway 81 (AR 81) is a north–south state highway in Jefferson County, Arkansas. The route runs 2.29 miles (3.69 km) from U.S. Route 65 (US 65) north to US 63/US 79. The designation also includes a spur route, Highway 81 Spur, created in 2005. Both highways are maintained by the Arkansas State Highway and Transportation Department (AHTD).

The Highway 81 designation has also been used for a former highway in Arkansas. A route between Arkansas City and Rohwer held the Highway 81 designation between 1926 and 1929. The designation was reused in 1945 to replace Highway 13 between Louisiana and US 65 east of Pine Bluff (present-day US 425).

== Route description ==
The route begins at an intersection with US 65 and the northern terminus of US 425 just east of Pine Bluff. Highway 81 runs due north as a section line road to an intersection with Highway 81S, when it turns due west and the road continues north as Highway 81S for another 0.42 miles (0.68 km) to serve the paper plant. After running briefly west, Highway 81 intersects US 63/US 79 and terminates.

== History ==
Highway 81 was first designated during the 1926 Arkansas state highway numbering in Desha County, but this route was supplanted by Highway 4 in 1929. The designation was revived in 1945, when it supplanted Highway 13 between Louisiana and US 65 in Pine Bluff.

The highway was extended north (along its current routing) to an International Paper plant on February 20, 1957. Other than a realignment for a bypass in Monticello in 1960, the route remained unchanged until November 16, 1988, when the AHTD and the Louisiana Department of Transportation and Development (LADOTD) proposed supplanting Highway 81 and Louisiana Highway 139 with a new route, US 425. This route was approved by the American Association of State Highway and Transportation Officials (AASHTO), renumbering the entire route except the short portion north of US 65 to the paper plant.

Following construction of Lock and Dam No. 4 on the Arkansas River, the Arkansas State Highway Commission desired a connection to the new location Highway 13 (now US 63/US 79, the current northern terminus). An extension of Highway 81 was created on July 13, 1994. Highway 81 was realigned to US 63/US 79 and Highway 81S was created off the former alignment to continue serving the paper plant on November 9, 2005.

== Major intersections ==
The entire route is in Jefferson County.

Location	mi	km	Destinations	Notes
	0.00	0.00	US 65 / US 425 – Pine Bluff, Dumas, Monticello	Southern terminus
	1.47	2.37	AR 81S north	Southern terminus of AR 81S
	2.29	3.69	US 63 / US 79 – Pine Bluff, Altheimer	Northern terminus
1.000 mi = 1.609 km; 1.000 km = 0.621 mi
