= U.S. Route 425 =

Highway in the Southern United States

U.S. Route 425
- US 425 highlighted in red

Route information
- Length: 220 mi (350 km)
- Existed: 1989 (extended north in 2002, south in 2005)–present

Major junctions
- South end: US 61 / US 84 at Natchez, MS
- US 65 in Clayton, LA: I-20 in Rayville, LA
- North end: I-530 / US 63 / US 65 / US 79 / US 65B / AR 190 in Pine Bluff, AR

Location
- Country: United States
- States: Mississippi, Louisiana, Arkansas
- Counties: MS: Adams; LA: Concordia, Catahoula, Franklin, Richland, Morehouse; AR: Ashley, Drew, Lincoln, Jefferson

Highway system
- United States Numbered Highway System; List; Special; Divided
← US 412	US	→ US 1
← MS 424	MS	→ MS 427
← LA 424	LA	→ LA 426
← US 412	AR	→ I-430

U.S. Route 425 (US 425) is a north–south United States highway that travels in the U.S. states of Mississippi, Louisiana, and Arkansas. It was first commissioned in 1989.

The route's northern terminus is in Pine Bluff, Arkansas, at an interchange with Interstate 530/U.S. Route 63/U.S. Route 65/U.S. Route 79/US 65B/AR 190. Until 2005, its southern terminus was in Bastrop, Louisiana, at an intersection with U.S. Route 165. In 2005, it was extended to Natchez, Mississippi, at an intersection with U.S. Route 61.

US 425 is a consolidation of former state highways. Most of US 425 in Louisiana, for example, is merely a concurrency with Louisiana Highway 15 (LA 15).

== Route description ==
The route number does not follow the numbering convention for U.S. Highways established by the American Association of State Highway and Transportation Officials. The number "425" indicates that this highway is a spur of US 25, which is much farther to the east (it is much more closely related to US 65). However, the two routes have never connected or even approached each other.

=== Mississippi ===
The southern terminus of US 425 is at a signalized intersection with US 61 and US 84 in Natchez. The route travels northwest through the city concurrent with US 84 to the Natchez–Vidalia Bridge, along which the two routes cross the Mississippi River into Louisiana.

=== Louisiana ===
After entering Louisiana, the concurrency with US 84 continues for approximately 14 miles to Ferriday. US 425 then splits and heads northeast, running concurrently with LA 15 through mostly farmland and small towns. Just north of Clayton is the southern terminus of US 65. Passing through Winnsboro the highways split at Archibald. LA 15 continues northwest to Monroe, LA while US 425 heads north to Rayville where it crosses I-20. At Mer Rouge, it intersects US 165 and the two highways run concurrent to Bastrop, LA. A few miles north of Bastrop, US 425 crosses into Arkansas south of Crossett.

=== Arkansas ===
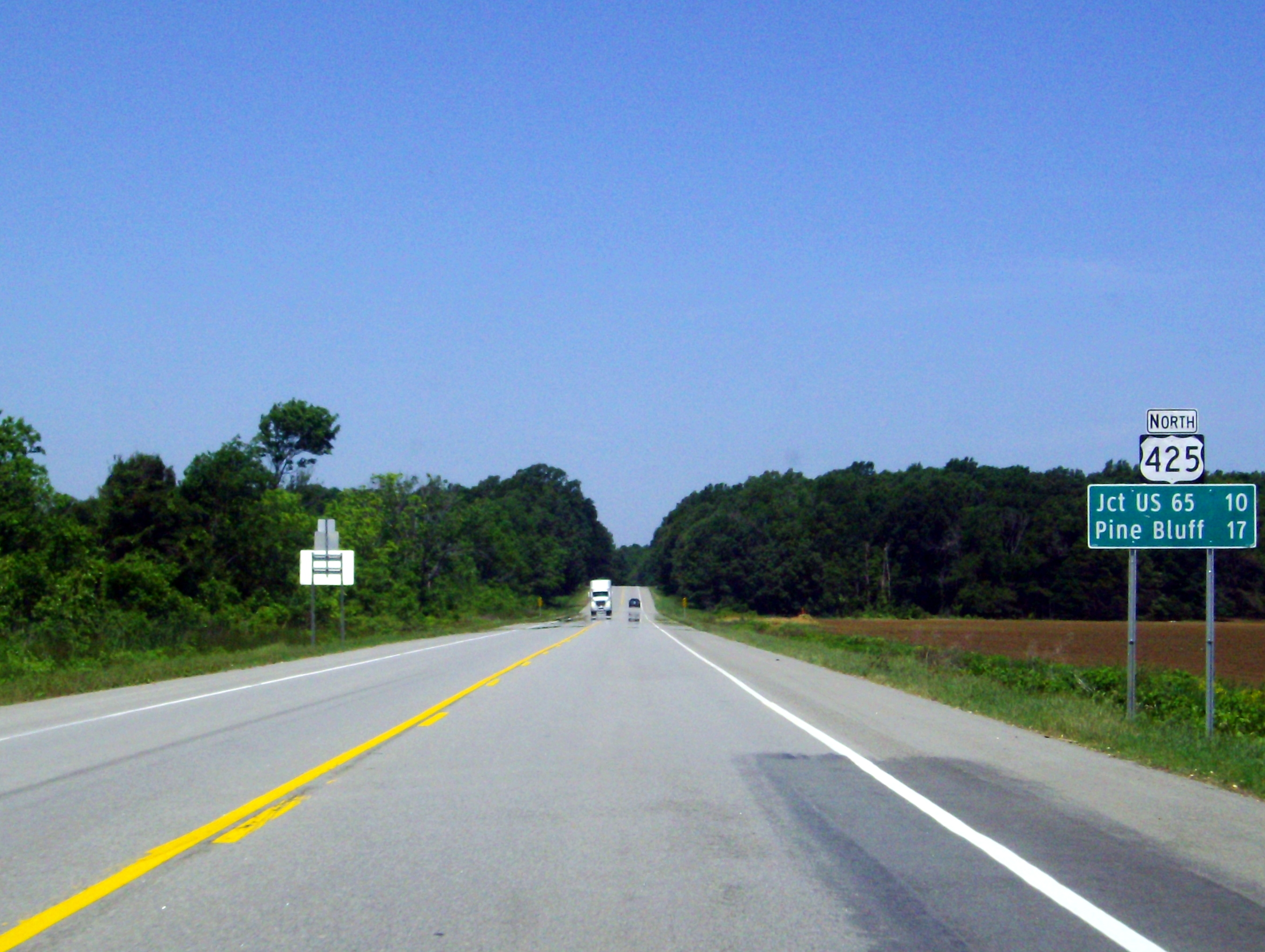
Along US 425 north of Star City

The route enters Arkansas near Rawls and runs north through rural Ashley County. Highway 425 forms a concurrency with US 82 east of Crosett, with the two routes running north through farmland and trees to Hamburg, the county seat of Ashley County. In Hamburg, the routes are joined by Highway 8, which runs east and west across the southern part of the state. North of the junction, the three routes pass the First United Methodist Church and historic properties within the Hamburg Commercial Historic District before US 82 turns east at St. Louis Street and US 425/AR 8 run north out of Hamburg. Passing more agricultural land, Highway 8 turns west in Fountain Hill just before the Drew County line.

Further north US 425 intersects Highway 133 in Lacey and Highway 172 before entering Monticello. The highway serves the University of Arkansas at Monticello in the southern part of town, also passing the Monticello Elementary School. US 425 intersects University Drive and continues north as a four–lane road. There is an interchange with Jordan Drive (AR 83S), after which US 425 enters residential Monticello. The route now curves to the west side of town, with Main Street (AR 83) serving downtown Monticello. Highway 83 was the previous alignment of AR 13, which US 425 replaced upon designation in 1989. There are plans to bypass Monticello even more efficiently as part of Interstate 69's extension into Arkansas.

US 425, now four–lane with center turn lane format, intersects US 278/Highway 35 at a busy intersection. Highway 35 forms a short concurrency north with US 425, which proceeds north and out of Monticello. After AR 35 turns west, Highway 425 has many rural junctions with county routes. Upon entering Lincoln County, the route passes the historic Mt. Zion Presbyterian Church in Relfs Bluff and the Parker House before entering Star City. Downtown, the highway forms a concurrency with Highway 11, which ends near the Lincoln County Courthouse and the Star City Commercial Historic District. The highway continues north through rural areas before intersecting US 65 in Jefferson County. US 65/US 425 run concurrent west to a high–volume interchange with I-530/US 63/US 79/US 65B/AR 190, where US 425 terminates.

== History ==
In Arkansas, US 425 replaced the southern half of Arkansas Highway 13, which was an original state highway in the area. The route is essentially the same as it was at inception in the 1926 state highway plan, connecting the major cities in its area of southeast Arkansas. Highway 13 now runs in north central Arkansas. Most of US Route 425 was repaved in 2010 within Ashley County.

=== Louisiana Highway 137 ===
Louisiana Highway 137
- Location: Morehouse and Richland parishes
- Length: 18.08 mi (29.10 km)
- Existed: 1955–2005

Louisiana Highway 137 (LA 137) was a state highway in Louisiana that serves Richland Parish and Morehouse Parish. It spanned 18.08 miles (29.10 km) in a south to north direction. LA 137 is now signed as U.S. 425 for its entire length.

From the south, LA 137 began as a state highway at an intersection with LA 15 north of Mangham in the small town of Archibald. It went north and intersected LA 584 before intersecting LA 135.

Passing under I-20, LA 137 met LA 3048 in the town of Rayville. After intersecting US 80, LA 137 entered Morehouse Parish, continuing north as a two-lane road until it swapped the U.S. 425 designation with LA 133.

LA 137 is a divided, four-lane highway south of Rayville, a pair of two one-way roads inside of Rayville, and an undivided, two-lane road north of Rayville. Before the 1955 renumbering, LA 137 was State Route 47 from Archibald to Rayville. The current routing for LA 137 did not exist, and travelers had to take US 80 west, then State Route 47 (Current LA 133) to Oak Ridge.

LA 137 was removed from the state highway system in 2005, when US 425 was extended south to Mississippi. It is still signed, however, as LA 137 and US 425.

== Major intersections ==
State	County	Location	mi	km	Destinations	Notes
Mississippi	Adams	Natchez	0.0	0.0	US 61 / US 61 Bus. begins / US 84 east / Trace Town Drive – Vicksburg, Brookhaven, Woodville, Baton Rouge, Airport	south end of US 84 / US 61 Bus. overlap
Mississippi	Adams	Natchez	0.6	0.97	US 61 Bus. north / MS 928 north	north end of US 61 Bus. overlap
Mississippi River			1.4 0.0	2.3 0.0	Natchez-Vidalia Bridge	
Louisiana	Concordia	Vidalia	0.1	0.16	LA 131	
Louisiana	Concordia	Taconey	2.515	4.048	LA 3180 (J. Logan Sewell Drive)	
Louisiana	Concordia		5.637	9.072	LA 3196	
Louisiana	Concordia		8.442	13.586	LA 3232	
Louisiana	Concordia	Ferriday	10.225	16.456	US 84 west / LA 15 south / LA 568 – Jonesville	north end of US 84 overlap; south end of LA 15 overlap
Louisiana	Concordia	Ferriday	10.575	17.019	LA 903 – Lake Concordia, Lake St. John	
Louisiana	Concordia	Clayton	16.313	26.253	US 65 north – Newellton, Tallulah, Lake Providence, Lake Bruin State Park	Southern terminus of US 65
Louisiana	Concordia	Clayton	16.841	27.103	LA 566	
Louisiana	Tensas River		17.0	27.4	Tensas River Lift Bridge	
Louisiana	Catahoula	Lee Bayou	20.106	32.357	LA 567	
Louisiana	Catahoula	Foules	24.824	39.950	LA 921	
Louisiana	Catahoula	Sicily Island	29.078	46.797	LA 8	
Louisiana	Catahoula	Peck	34.407	55.373	LA 913	
Louisiana	Catahoula		36.129	58.144	LA 3148	
Louisiana	Franklin	Wisner	38.453	61.884	LA 562	south end of LA 562 overlap
Louisiana	Franklin	Wisner	38.75	62.36	LA 562	north end of LA 562 overlap
Louisiana	Franklin		39.725	63.931	LA 875	
Louisiana	Franklin	Gilbert	43.083	69.335	LA 128	south end of LA 128 overlap
Louisiana	Franklin	Gilbert	43.237	69.583	LA 572	
Louisiana	Franklin	Gilbert	43.658	70.261	LA 128	north end of LA 128 overlap
Louisiana	Franklin		46.704	75.163	LA 3210	
Louisiana	Franklin		46.823	75.354	LA 1242	
Louisiana	Franklin		48.489	78.035	LA 3210	
Louisiana	Franklin	Winnsboro	51.063	82.178	LA 3201	
Louisiana	Franklin	Winnsboro	51.397	82.715	LA 864	
Louisiana	Franklin	Winnsboro	52.090	83.831	LA 865	
Louisiana	Franklin	Winnsboro	52.621	84.685	LA 4	south end of LA 4 overlap
Louisiana	Franklin	Winnsboro	52.945	85.207	LA 4 / LA 17 / LA 130	north end of LA 4 overlap
Louisiana	Franklin	Winnsboro	55.523	89.356	LA 868	
Louisiana	Franklin		57.765	92.964	LA 867	
Louisiana	Franklin	Baskin	58.554	94.234	LA 577	
Louisiana	Franklin	Baskin	59.397	95.590	LA 857	
Louisiana	Richland	Mangham	63.453	102.118	LA 132	south end of LA 132 overlap
Louisiana	Richland		64.177	103.283	LA 132	north end of LA 132 overlap
Louisiana	Richland	Archibald	66.215	106.563	LA 856	
Louisiana	Richland		66.521	107.055	LA 15 north	north end of LA 15 overlap
Louisiana	Richland		70.2	113.0	LA 584	south end of LA 584 overlap
Louisiana	Richland		70.321	113.171	LA 584	north end of LA 584 overlap
Louisiana	Richland	Rayville	73.253	117.889	LA 135 – Alto	
Louisiana	Richland	Rayville	73.768	118.718	I-20 – Monroe, Vicksburg	I-20 exit 138
Louisiana	Richland	Rayville	74.671	120.171	LA 3048 east	
Louisiana	Richland	Rayville	75.203	121.027	US 80	
Louisiana	Morehouse		84.486	135.967	LA 133 south – Girard	south end of LA 133 overlap
Louisiana	Morehouse	Oak Ridge	85.179	137.082	LA 134 – Collinston, Monroe	south end of LA 134 overlap
Louisiana	Morehouse	Oak Ridge	85.832	138.133	LA 134 – Epps	north end of LA 134 overlap
Louisiana	Morehouse		94.023	151.315	LA 3051 – Horseshoe Lake	
Louisiana	Morehouse	Mer Rouge	96.676	155.585	LA 2 east – Oak Grove	north end of LA 133 overlap; south end of LA 2 overlap
Louisiana	Morehouse	Mer Rouge	96.705	155.632	US 165 north / LA 138 – Collinston, Bonita	south end of US 165 overlap
Louisiana	Morehouse	Bastrop	101.42	163.22	LA 830-3 (Peach Orchard Road)	
Louisiana	Morehouse	Bastrop	101.906	164.002	LA 3051	
Louisiana	Morehouse	Bastrop	103.184	166.059	LA 830-4 (Cooperlake Road)	
Louisiana	Morehouse	Bastrop	103.536	166.625	LA 830-6 (McCreight Street)	
Louisiana	Morehouse	Bastrop	103.639	166.791	LA 830-5 (Elm Street)	
Louisiana	Morehouse	Bastrop	104.313	167.876	US 165 south / LA 2 west (West Madison) / LA 139 south / LA 593 south (South Washington)	north end of US 165 / LA 2 overlap; south end of LA 593 overlap
Louisiana	Morehouse	Bastrop	104.677	168.461	LA 830-1 (Harrington Avenue)	
Louisiana	Morehouse	Bastrop	105.134	169.197	LA 593 north (Bonner Ferry Road) – Bussey Brake Reservoir	north end of LA 593 overlap
Louisiana	Morehouse	Bastrop	105.666	170.053	LA 830-3 (Cherry Ridge Road)	
Louisiana	Morehouse		105.742	170.175	LA 830-2 (Shelton Road)	
Louisiana	Morehouse		106.123	170.788	LA 830-6 (McCreight Street)	
Louisiana	Morehouse	Log Cabin	108.784	175.071	LA 140	
Louisiana	Morehouse		111.799	179.923	LA 593 – Bussey Brake Reservoir	
Louisiana	Morehouse		113.977	183.428	LA 142 – Crossett, AR	
Louisiana	Morehouse		114.214	183.810	LA 1257 – Chemin-A-Haut State Park	
Louisiana	Morehouse		117.213	188.636	LA 590	
Louisiana-Arkansas border			120.969 0.0	194.681 0.0		
Arkansas	Ashley		9.4	15.1	US 82 west / AR 52 east – Crossett, El Dorado	south end of US 82 overlap
Arkansas	Ashley		12.0	19.3	AR 52 west – North Crossett, UAM College of Technology-Crossett	
Arkansas	Ashley	Hamburg	15.7	25.3	AR 189 west (West Jackson Street)	
Arkansas	Ashley	Hamburg	16.0	25.7	AR 8 east (East Parker Street) – Parkdale, Overflow NWR	south end of AR 8 overlap
Arkansas	Ashley	Hamburg	16.2	26.1	AR 189 north (West Washington Street) to AR 133	
Arkansas	Ashley	Hamburg	16.3	26.2	US 82 east – Lake Village	north end of US 82 overlap
Arkansas	Ashley	Fountain Hill	25.5	41.0	AR 8 west to AR 133 south – Johnsville, Crossett	north end of AR 8 overlap
Arkansas	Ashley	Fountain Hill	26.0	41.8	AR 160 west	
Arkansas	Drew	Lacey	32.8	52.8	AR 133 south to AR 160	
Arkansas	Drew	White Hall	40.5	65.2	AR 172 west	
Arkansas	Drew				US 278 Byp. east	Western terminus of US 278 Byp.; future I-69
Arkansas	Drew	Monticello	42.7	68.7	AR 83 south (University Drive) – University of Arkansas Monticello	
Arkansas	Drew	Monticello	42.8	68.9	AR 83 north	
Arkansas	Drew	Monticello	44.2	71.1	AR 83S	interchange
Arkansas	Drew	Monticello	45.4	73.1	US 278 – Warren, McGehee	
Arkansas	Drew		46.7	75.2	AR 35 north – Lake Monticello	
Arkansas	Lincoln		65.1	104.8	AR 54 east – Little Garnett	
Arkansas	Lincoln	Star City	66.7	107.3	AR 293 south (Cane Creek Road) – Cane Creek State Park	
Arkansas	Lincoln	Star City	67.2	108.1	AR 11 south (West Franklin Street)	
Arkansas	Lincoln	Star City	67.8	109.1	AR 11 north (Arkansas Street) / AR 114 west (Arkansas Avenue)	
Arkansas	Lincoln		77.8	125.2	AR 199 north / Allegiance Road – Tarry, Moscow	
Arkansas	Jefferson		88.5	142.4	US 65 south / AR 81 north – Grady, Lake Village	south end of US 65 overlap
Arkansas	Jefferson	Pine Bluff	90.5	145.6	AR 980 south – Airport	
Arkansas	Jefferson	Pine Bluff	91.0	146.5	I-530 north / US 63 / US 65 north / US 79 / US 65B north / AR 190 west (Harding Avenue) – Little Rock, Downtown Pine Bluff	Continuation north; north end of US 65 overlap
1.000 mi = 1.609 km; 1.000 km = 0.621 mi: Concurrency terminus
