= Louisiana Highway 140 =

State highway in Louisiana, United States

Louisiana Highway 140
- Old Bonita Road
- Route of LA 140 highlighted in red

Route information
- Maintained by Louisiana DOTD
- Length: 14.758 mi (23.751 km)
- Existed: 1955 renumbering–present

Major junctions
- West end: US 425 in Log Cabin
- East end: US 165 / LA 599 in Bonita

Location
- Country: United States
- State: Louisiana
- Parishes: Morehouse

Highway system
- Louisiana State Highway System; Interstate; US; State; Scenic
← LA 139	→ LA 141
← SR C-1485	C-1486	→ SR C-1487

Louisiana Highway 140 (LA 140) is a state highway located in Morehouse Parish, Louisiana. It runs 14.76 miles (23.75 km) in an east–west direction from U.S. Highway 425 (US 425) in Log Cabin to a junction with U.S. Highway 165 (US 165) and LA 599 in Bonita.

The route provides the most direct connection between Bastrop, the parish seat, and northbound US 165, which heads north from Bonita toward the Arkansas state line. US 165 takes a more indirect routing, heading eastward out of Bastrop before turning north at Mer Rouge. Providing both a north–south and an east–west function, the signage for LA 140 does not carry directional banners. The route is known locally as Old Bonita Road.

== Route description ==
From the west, LA 140 begins at an intersection with US 425 in a rural area known as Log Cabin, 3.1 miles (5.0 km) northeast of Bastrop. It proceeds northeast along Old Bonita Road, and the area gradually becomes sparsely populated over the next several miles. After making a brief curve to the north, LA 140 intersects LA 591 (Old Berlin Highway) at a point known as Twin Oaks. LA 591 heads north along Bayou Bartholomew toward the Arkansas state line.

Soon after resuming its northeastern course, the surroundings abruptly change from thick forest to open farmland. LA 140 curves due east briefly and intersects LA 599 (Sisson Highway), which makes a long semi-circle before meeting LA 140 again at its final destination of Bonita. LA 140 then curves back to the northeast and 3.3 miles (5.3 km) later, it intersects LA 833 (Jones Cutoff Road). LA 140 turns due east while LA 833 heads northeast to US 165 at Jones, bypassing Bonita.

LA 140 then curves southeast into the small village of Bonita. At Railroad Street, the highway makes a sharp turn to the south to cross the Union Pacific Railroad (UPRR) tracks at grade. LA 140 ends shortly afterward at US 165 (Bonita Avenue) opposite a second intersection with LA 599 (Rosenwald Road). US 165 heads northeast toward the Arkansas state line and the city of Wilmot, Arkansas.

LA 140 is classified as a rural major collector by the Louisiana Department of Transportation and Development (La DOTD). Average daily traffic volume in 2013 is reported as 3,800 vehicles between the western terminus and Twin Oaks, decreasing to 810 to the junction with LA 833, and again to 260 from there to the eastern terminus. LA 140 is an undivided two-lane highway for its entire length with a posted speed limit of 55 mph (90 km/h).

== History ==
=== Pre-1955 route numbering ===
State Route C-1486
- Location: Morehouse Parish
- Length: 2.6 mi (4.2 km)
- Existed: 1930s–1955

In the original Louisiana Highway system in use between 1921 and 1955, the modern LA 140 was part of three consecutively numbered routes: State Route C-1484, State Route C-1485, and State Route C-1486. All three were designated during the early 1930s by the state highway department. Route C-1484 followed the current route of LA 140 from the western terminus at Log Cabin to the present junction with LA 591, where it turned northward and headed to the Arkansas state line. Route C-1485 picked up the route to the present junction with LA 833, where it continued ahead to the northeast toward Jones.

The remainder of the modern LA 140 from LA 833 to US 165 at Bonita was originally designated as State Route C-1486. Like the previous two routes, it was created in the early 1930s by the state highway department. (State highways in the pre-1955 system ceased to be designated by acts of the state legislature after 1930 and began to carry a "C-" prefix.) All three routes remained the same up to the 1955 Louisiana Highway renumbering.

=== Post-1955 route history ===
LA 140 was created in the 1955 renumbering from the above described parts of former State Routes C-1484 and C-1485 as well as the entirety of former State Route C-1486.

La 140—From a junction with La 139 at or near Log Cabin through or near Twin Oaks to a junction with La-US 165 at or near Bonita.

— 1955 legislative route description

The route has remained the same to the present day. However, the western terminus at Log Cabin was originally a junction with LA 139. US 425 was established in 1989 following the existing route of LA 139 from the Arkansas state line south to Bastrop. The designation of LA 139 was then replaced by US 425, which became the new western terminus of LA 140. In addition, LA 140 has been slightly realigned at its western terminus to intersect US 425 at a right-angle. This was done in conjunction with a project completed in April 2012 that widened US 425 to four lanes north of Bastrop.

== Major intersections ==
The entire highway is in Morehouse Parish.

Location	mi	km	Destinations	Notes
Log Cabin	0.000	0.000	US 425 (Crossett Road) – Bastrop, Crossett	Western terminus
Twin Oaks	6.677	10.746	LA 591 (Old Berlin Road)	Southern terminus of LA 591
	8.734	14.056	LA 599 (Sisson Road)	Western terminus of LA 599
	12.243	19.703	LA 833 (Jones Cutoff Road)	Southern terminus of LA 833
Bonita	14.758	23.751	US 165 (Bonita Avenue) – Mer Rouge, Wilmot; LA 599 (Rosenwald Road)	Eastern terminus of LA 140 and LA 599
1.000 mi = 1.609 km; 1.000 km = 0.621 mi
