= Wham, Louisiana =

Wham
- Unincorporated community
- Location within the state of Louisiana
- Coordinates: 32°37′35″N 91°55′24″W
- Country: United States
- State: Louisiana
- Parish: Ouachita
- Elevation: 72 ft (22 m)
- Time zone: UTC-6 (Central (EST))
  - Summer (DST): UTC-5 (EDT)
- GNIS feature ID: 556410

Wham (also Lieber) is an unincorporated community located in Ouachita Parish, Louisiana, United States.

== History ==
Little is known about the early history of the community, but it is believed that people have been living in the local area since the 1840s.

The community sits on a body of water known as Wham Brake. It has served as a poplular hunting and fishing spot for outdoorsmen since the 1940s. The land is now owned and managed by the Louisiana Department of Wildlife and Fisheries. The Wham Brake Project was a habitat restoration project that tended to areas of natural flooding and caused an "increase [in] waterfowl forage production." It was completed in 2017.

An abandoned Texaco from the 1980s sits at the intersection of LA-134 and LA-139.
