= Vixen, Louisiana =

- Unincorporated community
- Location within Louisiana Location within the United States
- Coordinates: 32°14′04″N 92°16′08″W
- Country: United States
- State: Louisiana
- Parish: Caldwell Parish
- Elevation: 184 ft (56 m)
- Area code: 318
- GNIS feature ID: 556337

Vixen is an unincorporated community in Caldwell Parish, Louisiana, United States.

== History ==
An early variant name was "Maud". A post office called Maud was established in 1880, the name was changed to Vixen in 1898, and the post office closed in 1928. The origin of the name "Vixen" is obscure.
