= Wildsville, Louisiana =

- Unincorporated community
- Location within Louisiana Location within the United States
- Coordinates: 31°36′57″N 91°47′02″W
- Country: United States
- State: Louisiana
- Parish: Concordia
- Elevation: 56 ft (17 m)
- Time zone: UTC-6 (Central (CST))
  - Summer (DST): UTC-5 (CDT)
- ZIP code: 71377
- Area code: 318
- GNIS feature ID: 540409

Wildsville is an unincorporated community in Concordia Parish, Louisiana, United States. The community is located on U.S. Route 84, 2 miles (3.2 km) east of Jonesville. Wildsville had a post office until May 13, 1995; it still has its own ZIP code, 71377.
