= Terry, Louisiana =

- Unincorporated community
- Location within Louisiana Location within the United States
- Coordinates: 32°55′46″N 91°20′55″W
- Country: United States
- State: Louisiana
- Parish: West Carroll Parish
- Elevation: 49 ft (15 m)
- Time zone: UTC-6 (Central (CST))
  - Summer (DST): UTC-5 (CDT)

Terry, Louisiana is an unincorporated community in West Carroll Parish in the U.S. state of Louisiana. It is on Louisiana Highway 17 between Kilbourne and Oak Grove, on Tiger Bayou and Coleman Bayou watersheds.

== History ==
Terry was named after the original purchaser of the land on which it is located, James Terry, who came to the area from neighboring Chicot County, Arkansas in 1835. The land was primarily used for agricultural purposes until 1906, when railroad employees working on a railway right-of-way established a camp on the property that they called "Terry Camp." Commercial development serving the community, including a general store and a cotton gin, followed, and houses and a church were built, forming the community.
