= Bee Bayou, Louisiana =

Unincorporated community in Louisiana

- Unincorporated community
- Location within Louisiana Location within the United States
- Coordinates: 32°28′24″N 91°41′44″W
- Country: United States
- State: Louisiana
- Parish: Richland
- Elevation: 52 ft (16 m)
- Time zone: UTC-6 (Central (CST))
  - Summer (DST): UTC-5 (CDT)
- Area code: 318
- GNIS feature ID: 542971
- FIPS code: 22-05735

Bee Bayou is an unincorporated community in Richland Parish, Louisiana, United States.
