= Charlieville, Louisiana =

- Unincorporated community
- Location within Louisiana Location within the United States
- Coordinates: 32°18′25″N 91°55′09″W
- Country: United States
- State: Louisiana
- Parish: Richland
- Elevation: 69 ft (21 m)
- Time zone: UTC-6 (Central (CST))
  - Summer (DST): UTC-5 (CDT)
- Area code: 318
- GNIS feature ID: 543073

Charlieville is an unincorporated community in Richland Parish, Louisiana, United States. The community is located 17 miles (27.36 kilometres) SE of Monroe, Louisiana.

== History ==
Charlieville was a landing for steamboats in the 1800s on the banks of Boeuf River.
