= Chemin-A-Haut State Park =

State park in Louisiana, United States

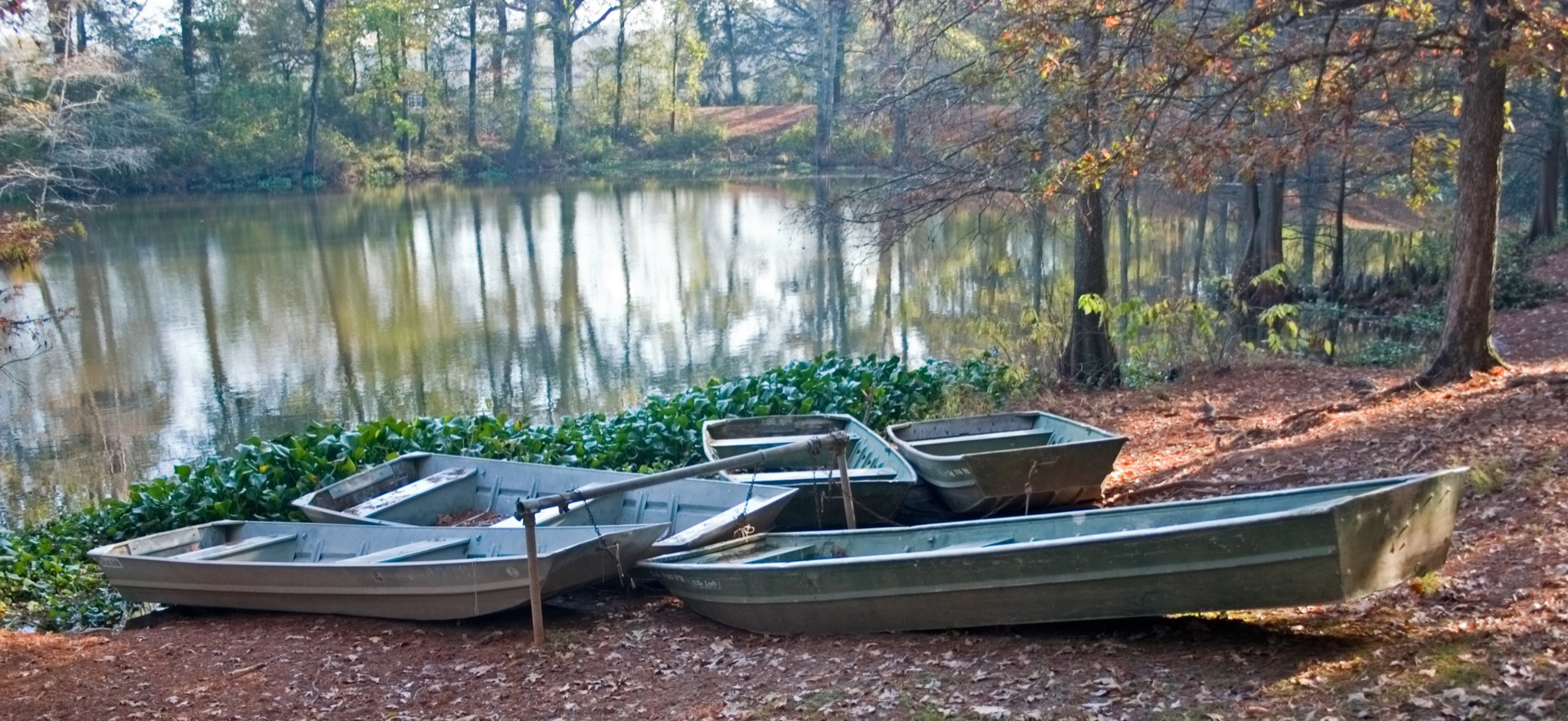
- Boats on the water in Chemin-A-Haut State Park.

- Location within Louisiana
- Location: Morehouse Parish, Louisiana, United States of America
- Coordinates: 32.91°N 91.845°W
- Area: 503 acres (2.04 km^{2}; 0.786 sq mi)
- Established: 1935
- Visitors: 28,265 (in 2022)
- Governing body: Louisiana Office of State Parks
- Website: www.crt.state.la.us/parks/icheminah.aspx

Chemin-A-Haut State Park is a 503-acre (2.04 km^{2}) site located in northern Morehouse Parish, Louisiana. Visitors may access the park from U.S. Highway 425 about 10 miles (16 km) north of Bastrop. Chemin-à-Haut means "High Road" in French. Much of the park is on a high bluff overlooking winding Bayou Bartholomew. Chemin-A-Haut was one of the earliest additions to the Louisiana State Park system.

The Nature Conservancy in Louisiana has recently acquired the 247-acre (1.00 km^{2}) DeBlieux tract, located in a large bend of Bayou Bartholomew, and will eventually transfer the land to the State of Louisiana. The property will be added to Chemin-A-Haut, thus increasing the park's size to 750 acres (3.0 km^{2}). Bayou Bartholomew contains over 115 fish species, one of the highest counts of any stream in North America.

Visitors to the park may enjoy camping, fishing, hiking, picnicking and wildlife observation. There is a 8-mile (13 km) equestrian trail for horseback riders. During the hot summer months, guests may cool off in an on-site swimming pool.
