= Swartz, Louisiana =

Swartz
- Census-designated place
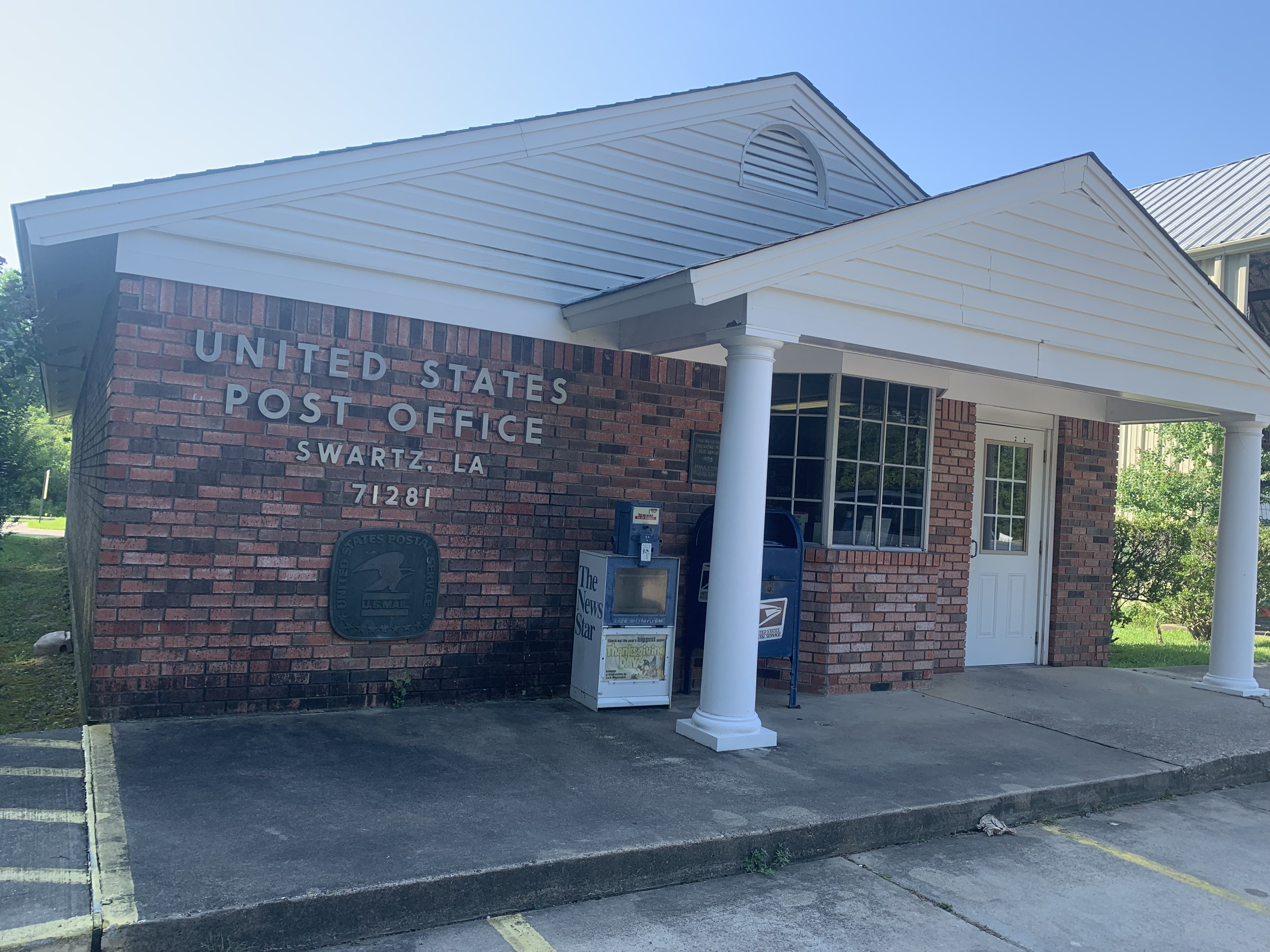
- Swartz, Louisiana U.S. Post Office

- Location of Swartz in Ouachita Parish, Louisiana.

- Location of Swartz in Louisiana
- Coordinates: 32°34′05″N 91°59′45″W
- Country: United States
- State: Louisiana
- Parish: Ouachita

Area
  - Total: 8.14 sq mi (21.07 km^{2})
- Elevation: 85 ft (26 m)

Population (2020)
  - Total: 4,354
  - Density: 535.2/sq mi (206.65/km^{2})
- Time zone: UTC-6 (CST)
  - Summer (DST): UTC-5 (CDT)
- ZIP code: 71203
- Area code: 318
- FIPS code: 22-74340
- GNIS feature ID: 2402908

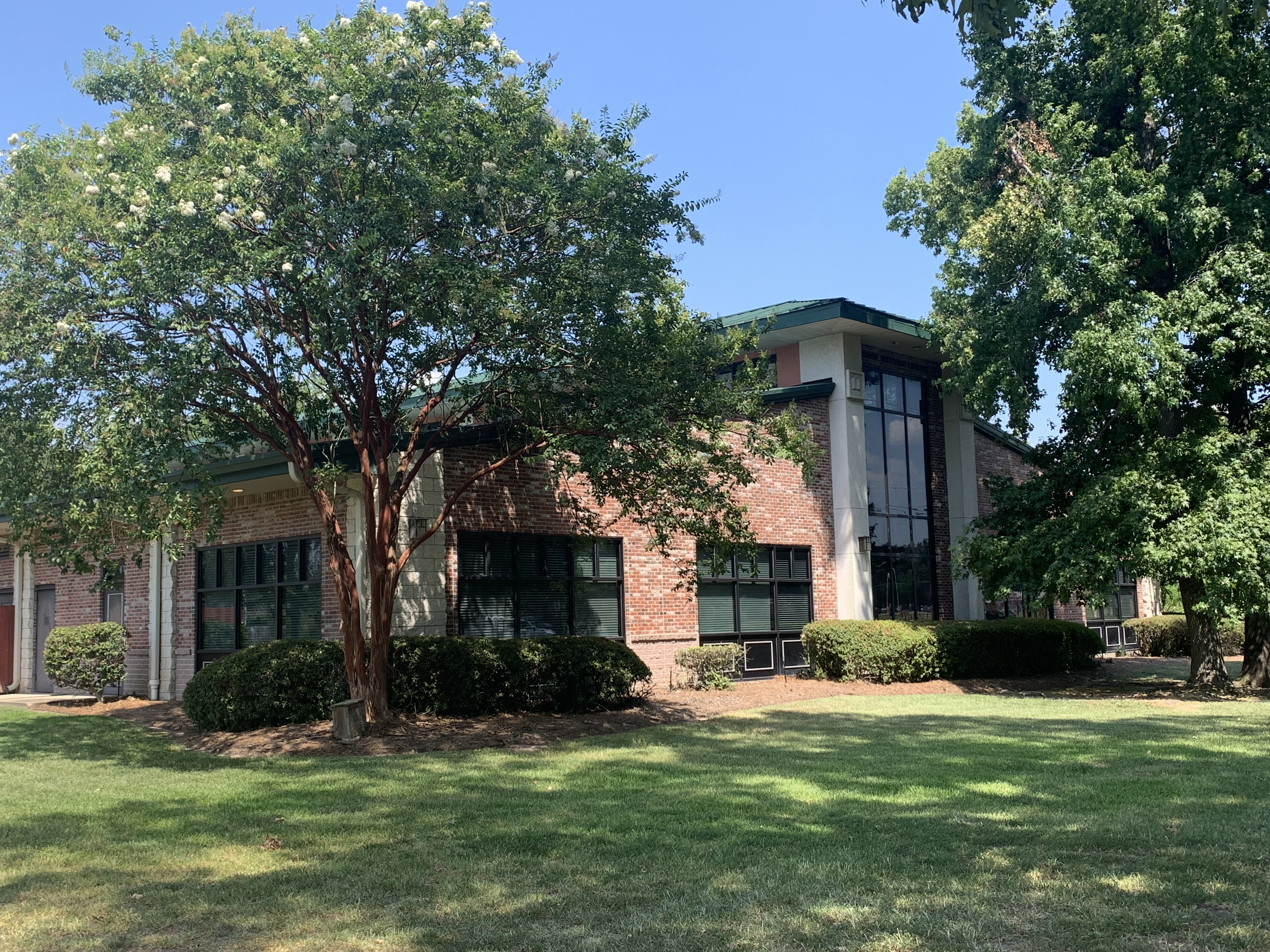
Louise Williams Library, Swartz, Louisiana, 2023

Swartz is a census-designated place (CDP) in Ouachita Parish in northeastern Louisiana, United States. The population was 4,354 at the 2020 United States census. It is part of the Monroe Metropolitan Statistical Area.

== History ==
Swartz began as the site of the Swartz Sawmill, owned by the E. G. Swartz Company Ltd., as well as The Swartz & Ouachita City Railroad.

== Geography ==
According to the United States Census Bureau, the CDP has a total area of 8.13 square miles (21.1 km^{2}), all land.

== Demographics ==
Historical population
Census	Pop.	Note	%±
1990	3,698		—
2000	4,247		14.8%
2010	4,536		6.8%
2020	4,354		−4.0%
U.S. Decennial Census; 1950 1960 1970 1980; 1990 2000 2010

Swartz first appeared as a census designated place the 1990 U.S. census.

=== 2020 census ===
As of the 2020 census, Swartz had a population of 4,354. The median age was 38.6 years. 25.3% of residents were under the age of 18 and 15.3% of residents were 65 years of age or older. For every 100 females there were 89.6 males, and for every 100 females age 18 and over there were 85.3 males age 18 and over.

Swartz racial composition
Race	Number	Percentage
White (non-Hispanic)	2,913	66.9%
Black or African American (non-Hispanic)	1,117	25.65%
Native American	11	0.25%
Asian	31	0.71%
Pacific Islander	2	0.05%
Other/Mixed	174	4.0%
Hispanic or Latino	106	2.43%

There were 1,738 households in Swartz, of which 35.3% had children under the age of 18 living in them. Of all households, 48.9% were married-couple households, 15.7% were households with a male householder and no spouse or partner present, and 30.4% were households with a female householder and no spouse or partner present. About 26.6% of all households were made up of individuals and 10.9% had someone living alone who was 65 years of age or older.

There were 1,906 housing units, of which 8.8% were vacant. The homeowner vacancy rate was 2.7% and the rental vacancy rate was 13.1%.

80.8% of residents lived in urban areas, while 19.2% lived in rural areas.

=== 2000 census ===
As of the 2000 United States census, there were 4,247 people, 1,557 households, and 1,250 families residing in the CDP. The population density was 314.7 inhabitants per square mile (121.5/km^{2}). There were 1,642 housing units at an average density of 121.7 per square mile (47.0/km^{2}). The racial makeup of the CDP was 91.10% White, 6.80% African American, 0.40% Native American, 0.47% Asian, and 0.78% from other races. Hispanic or Latino of any race were 1.62% of the population.

There were 1,557 households, out of which 41.6% had children under the age of 18 living with them, 66.5% were married couples living together, 10.6% had a female householder with no husband present, and 19.7% were non-families. 16.5% of all households were made up of individuals, and 5.0% had someone living alone who was 65 years of age or older. The average household size was 2.73 and the average family size was 3.06.

In the CDP, the population was spread out, with 28.1% under the age of 18, 10.8% from 18 to 24, 30.9% from 25 to 44, 21.9% from 45 to 64, and 8.4% who were 65 years of age or older. The median age was 32 years. For every 100 females, there were 93.9 males. For every 100 females age 18 and over, there were 89.9 males.

The median income for a household in the CDP was $42,645, and the median income for a family was $50,682. Males had a median income of $32,006 versus $25,305 for females. The per capita income for the CDP was $17,058. About 5.9% of families and 8.3% of the population were below the poverty line, including 9.8% of those under age 18 and 10.5% of those age 65 or over.

== Education ==
The school district is Ouachita Parish School District.

Swartz Lower Elementary School and Swartz Upper Elementary School feed into East Ouachita Middle School and Ouachita Parish High School.

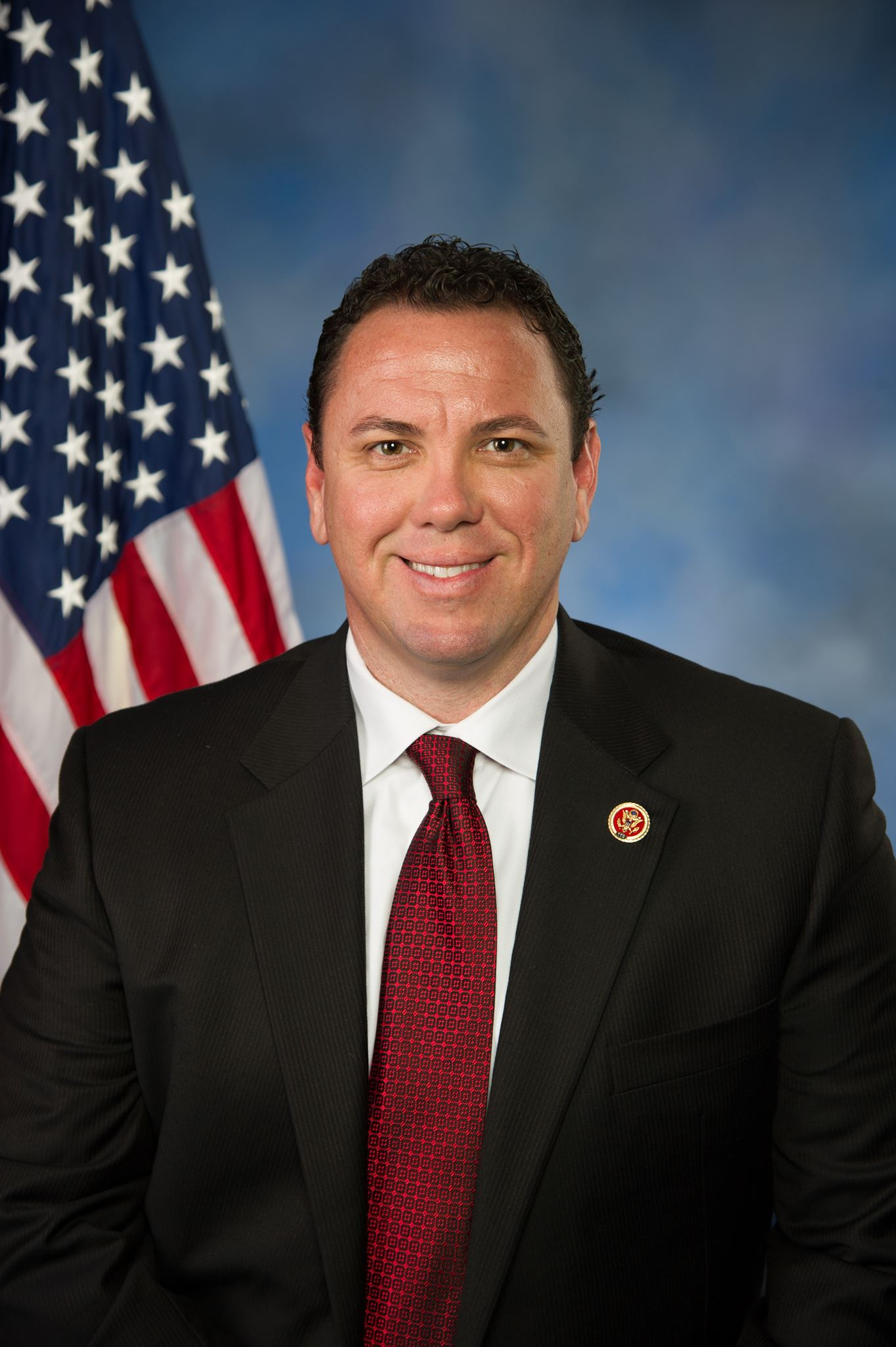
Fmr. U.S. Rep. Vance McAllister, 2013

== Notable people ==
- Swartz is the residence of Vance McAllister, the former Republican U.S. Representative from Louisiana's 5th congressional district.
