= Gassoway, Louisiana =

Gassoway
- Unincorporated community
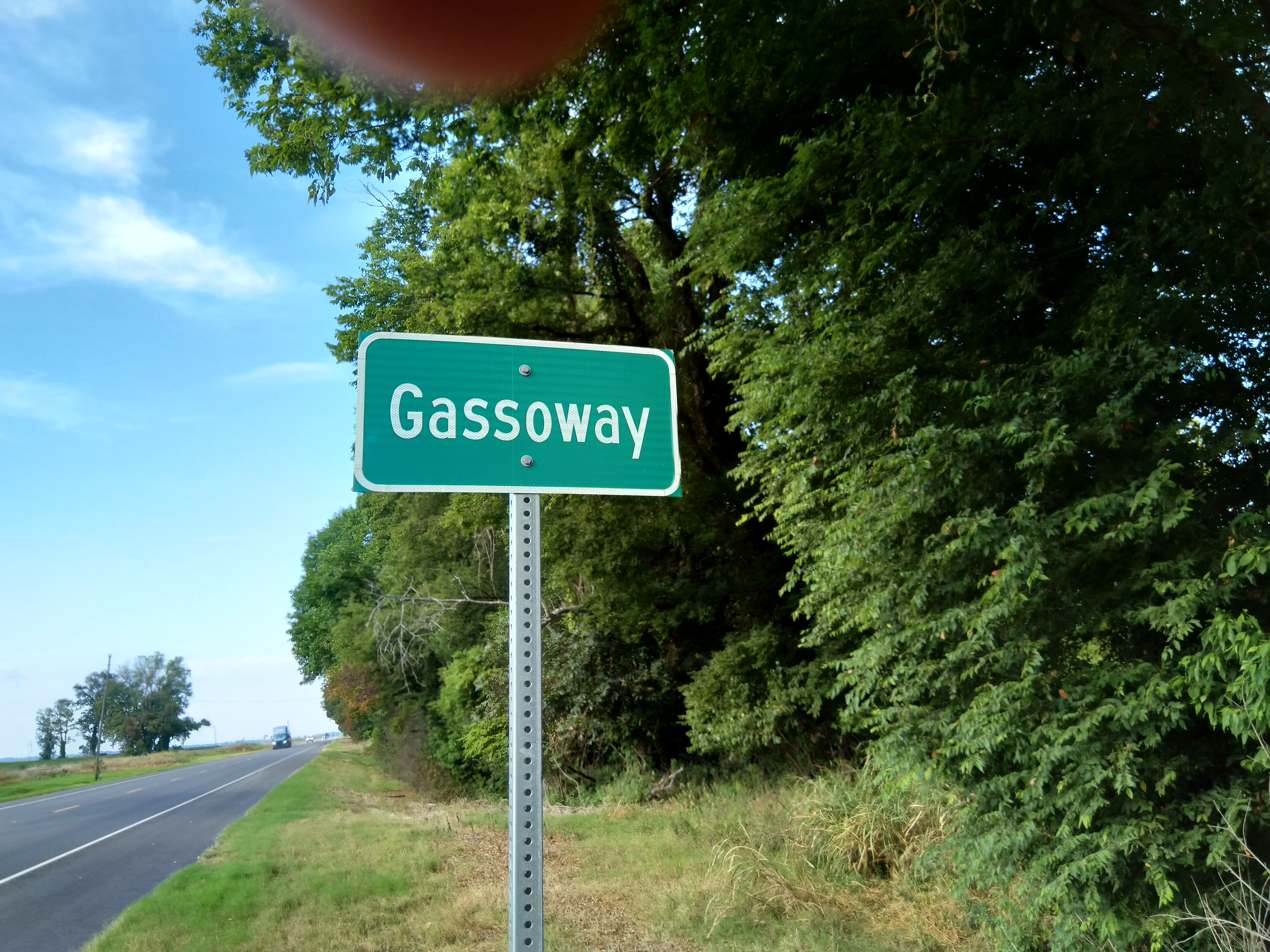

- Location of Gassoway in Louisiana
- Coordinates: 32°59′23″N 91°13′29″W
- Country: United States
- State: Louisiana
- Parish: East Carroll
- Elevation: 108 ft (33 m)
- Time zone: UTC-6 (CST)
  - Summer (DST): UTC-5 (CDT)
- ZIP code: 71254
- GNIS feature ID: 541098

Gassoway is an unincorporated community in East Carroll Parish, Louisiana, United States located on U.S. Route 65. Gassoway is approximately 5 miles (8.0 km) east of Kilbourne and approximately 8 miles (13 km) south of Eudora
