= Sterlington, Louisiana =

- Town
- Town of Sterlington
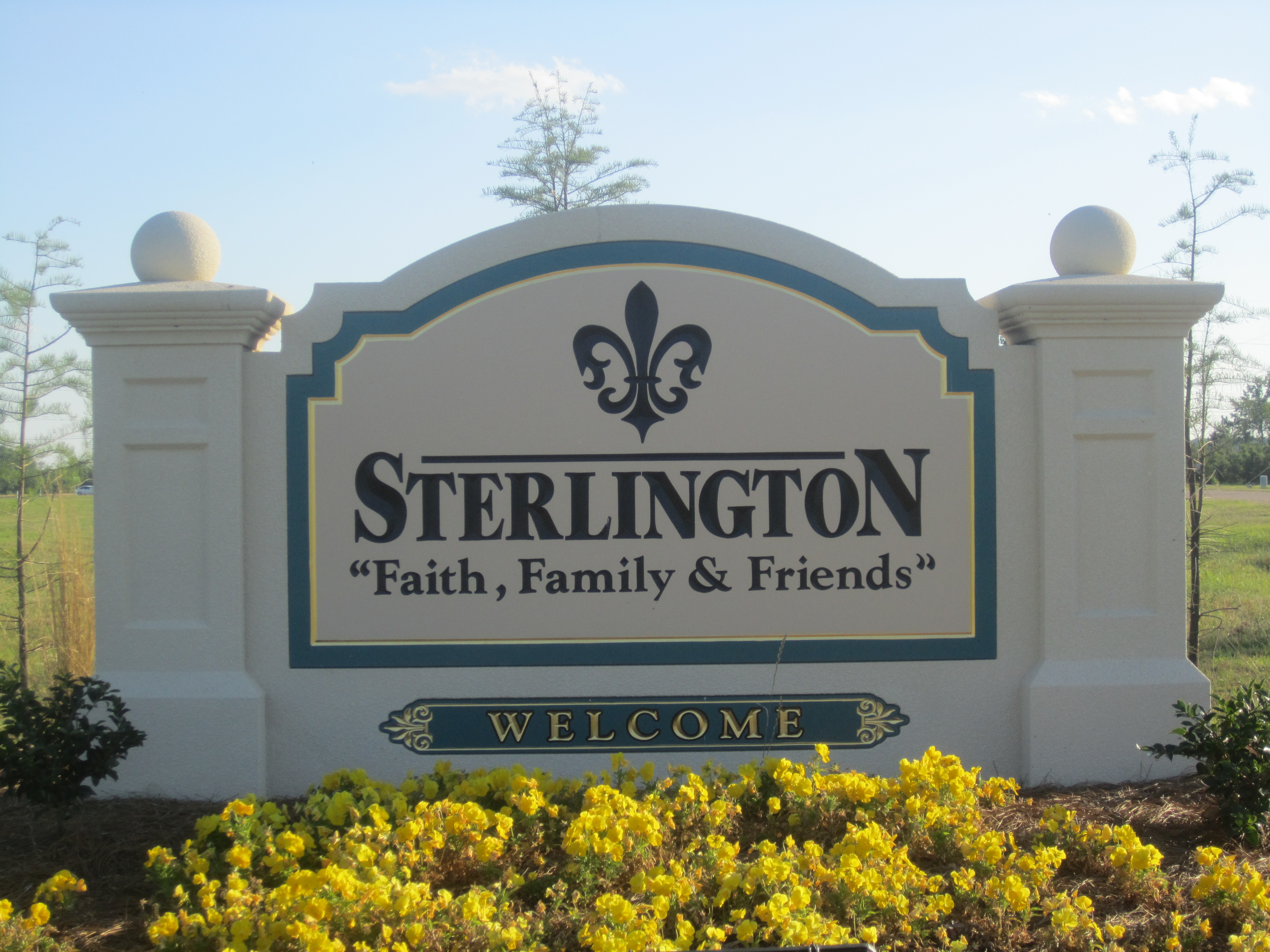
- Motto: You've Made It Home
- Location of Sterlington in Ouachita Parish, Louisiana.

- Location of Louisiana in the United States
- Coordinates: 32°41′20″N 92°03′37″W
- Country: United States
- State: Louisiana
- Parish: Ouachita
- Incorporated: 1961

Government
  - Mayor: Matt Talbert (Republican)

Area
  - Total: 2.83 sq mi (7.34 km^{2})
  - Land: 2.83 sq mi (7.34 km^{2})
  - Water: 0 sq mi (0.00 km^{2})
- Elevation: 79 ft (24 m)

Population (2020)
  - Total: 1,980
  - Density: 699/sq mi (269.9/km^{2})
- Time zone: UTC-6 (CST)
  - Summer (DST): UTC-5 (CDT)
- ZIP code: 71280
- Area code: 318
- FIPS code: 22-73255
- GNIS feature ID: 2406666
- Website: www.townofsterlington.com

Sterlington is a town in northern Ouachita Parish, Louisiana, United States, near the boundary with Union Parish. As of the 2020 census, Sterlington had a population of 1,980. In 2014, Sterlington was the fastest-growing community in Northeast Louisiana.

== History ==
Former Mayor Vern Breland was subsequently arrested for malfeasance in office in April 2020.

In 2022, the U.S. Securities and Exchange Commission charged the town of Sterlington, its former mayor, and the town's advise with misleading investors in the sale of $5.8 million in municipal bonds in 2017 and 2018.

== Geography ==
According to the United States Census Bureau, the town has a total area of 2.3 square miles (6.0 km^{2}), of which 2.3 square miles (5.9 km^{2}) is land and 0.43% is water.

== Demographics ==
Historical population
Census	Pop.	Note	%±
1970	1,118		—
1980	1,400		25.2%
1990	1,140		−18.6%
2000	1,276		11.9%
2010	1,594		24.9%
2020	1,980		24.2%
2025 (est.)	2,663	▲	34.5%
U.S. Decennial Census

=== 2020 census ===
As of the 2020 census, Sterlington had a population of 1,980. The median age was 31.4 years. 30.5% of residents were under the age of 18 and 11.1% were 65 years of age or older. For every 100 females there were 90.9 males, and for every 100 females age 18 and over there were 79.6 males age 18 and over.

Sterlington racial composition as of 2020
Race	Number	Percentage
White (non-Hispanic)	1,381	69.75%
Black or African American (non-Hispanic)	402	20.3%
Asian	18	0.91%
Other/Mixed	98	4.95%
Hispanic or Latino	81	4.09%

There were 770 households in Sterlington, of which 46.1% had children under the age of 18 living in them. Of all households, 42.9% were married-couple households, 14.3% were households with a male householder and no spouse or partner present, and 37.7% were households with a female householder and no spouse or partner present. About 22.9% of all households were made up of individuals and 7.1% had someone living alone who was 65 years of age or older.

There were 839 housing units, of which 8.2% were vacant. The homeowner vacancy rate was 1.2% and the rental vacancy rate was 7.9%. 0.0% of residents lived in urban areas, while 100.0% lived in rural areas.

== Economy ==
Since 1930, Sterlington has been home to ANGUS Chemical Company, a wholly owned subsidiary of the Dow Chemical Company, provides approximately 204 full-time and contract jobs to the area. ANGUS has a $20 million annual impact on the local economy, as well as "Contributes more than $50,000 annually to the United Way and other community outreach programs."

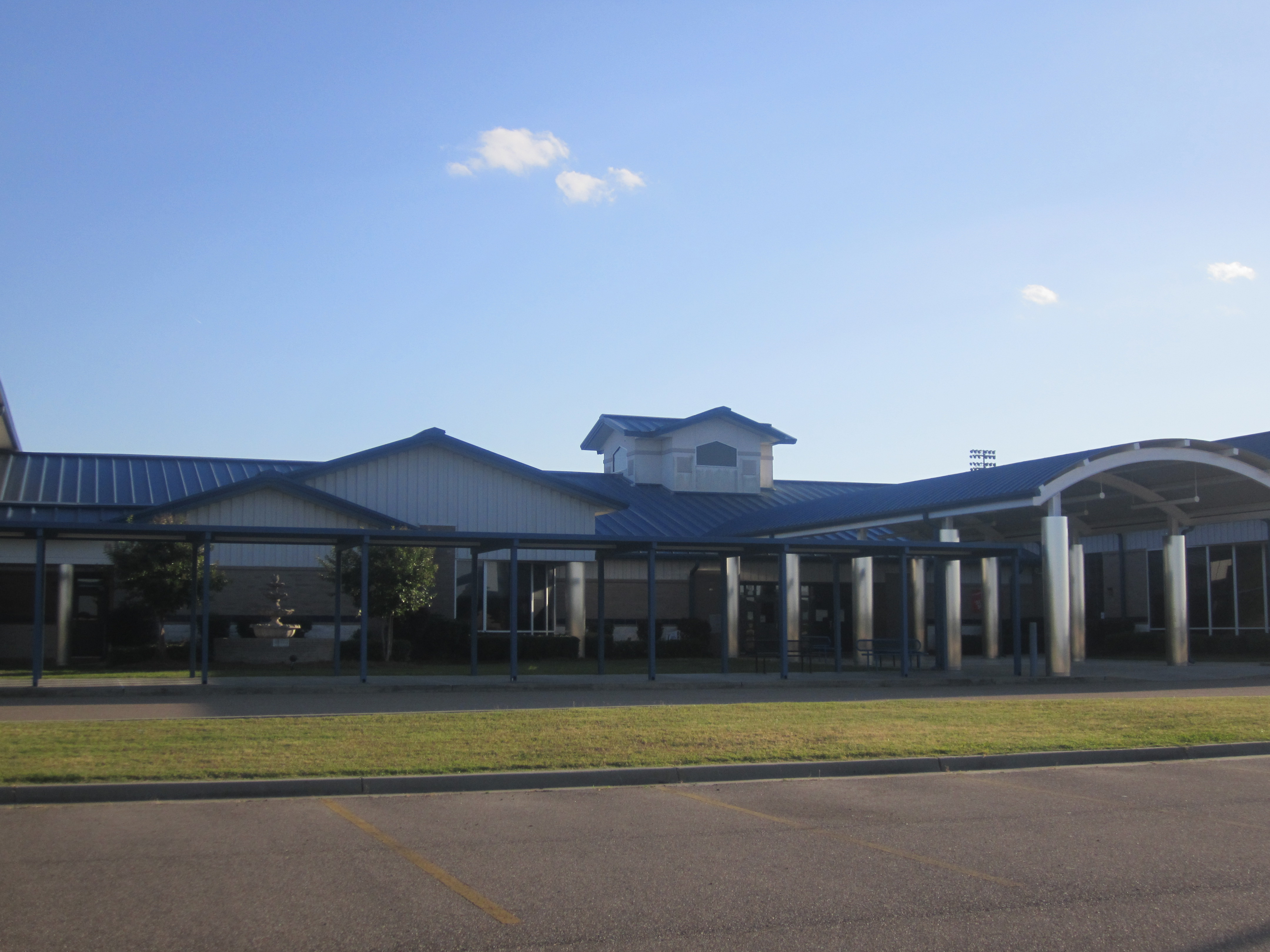
Sterlington High School

== Education ==
Sterlington is part of the Ouachita Parish School System, and has one elementary school, Sterlington Elementary School. Sterlington Middle School and High School are also part of the school district. Sterlington Elementary feeds into Sterlington Middle and Sterlington High.

== Notable people ==
Actor Ed Nelson relocated with his family to Sterlington from New Orleans in 2005 in the aftermath of Hurricane Katrina.

U.S. Ambassador Edward J. Perkins was born in Sterlington in 1928.
