= East Carroll Parish, Louisiana =

Parish in Louisiana, United States

East Carroll Parish
- Parish
- Parish of East Carroll; Paroisse de Carroll Est (French)
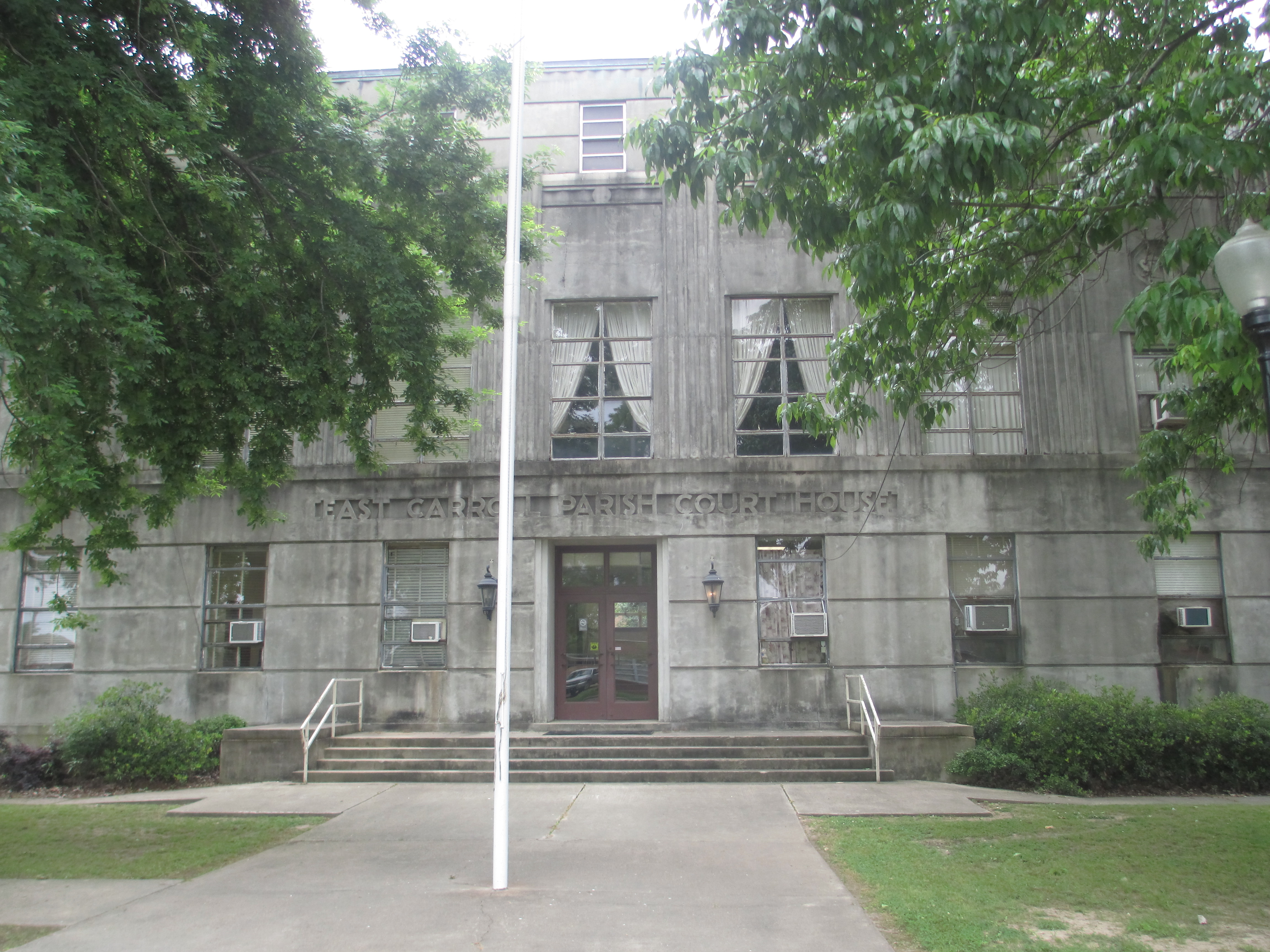
- East Carroll Parish Courthouse in Lake Providence

- Location within the U.S. state of Louisiana
- Coordinates: 32°44′N 91°14′W
- Country: United States
- State: Louisiana
- Founded: March 26, 1877
- Named for: Charles Carroll of Carrollton
- Seat: Lake Providence
- Largest town: Lake Providence

Area
  - Total: 442 sq mi (1,140 km^{2})
  - Land: 421 sq mi (1,090 km^{2})
  - Water: 22 sq mi (57 km^{2}) 4.9%

Population (2020)
  - Total: 7,459
  - Estimate (2025): 6,760 ▼
  - Density: 17.7/sq mi (6.84/km^{2})
- Time zone: UTC−6 (Central)
  - Summer (DST): UTC−5 (CDT)
- Congressional district: 5th

East Carroll Parish (French: Paroisse de Carroll Est) is a parish located in the Mississippi Delta in northeastern Louisiana. As of 2020, its population was 7,459. The parish seat is Lake Providence. An area of cotton plantations in the antebellum era, the parish in the early 21st century has about 74% of its land devoted to agriculture.

== History ==
This area is part of the delta along the western edge of the Mississippi River, long subject to the seasonal flooding that gave the area fertile soils. It was occupied by indigenous peoples for thousands of years. European explorers encountered the historic tribes of the Caddo and Choctaw in this area, as well as the Natchez on the east side of the Mississippi River.

In the 1830s, the United States forced out most of the people of the Five Civilized Tribes from the Southeast to west of the Mississippi River in Indian Territory to make way for development by European Americans. Areas along the river were cleared and developed for cultivation of cotton, the major commodity crop in the Deep South before the Civil War. The cotton was cultivated and processed on plantations by large groups of enslaved African-American laborers.

Prior to 1814, all of the territory covered by the current East Carroll Parish was part of the now defunct Warren Parish. The original Carroll Parish, before it was divided into "East" and "West" segments after Reconstruction, was named for Charles Carroll of Carrollton, Maryland, the only Roman Catholic signer of the Declaration of Independence. This and other nearby parishes along the Mississippi River were called the Natchez District, referring to the major port on the Mississippi side of the river. Both areas were developed for cotton plantations.

Given the dependence of plantation agriculture on enslaved workers, the population of this area was majority African American well before the American Civil War. Carroll Parish had 11,000 slaves in 1860, more than three times the white population of the total parish. Most were located on the plantations in the floodplain along the Mississippi River. During the war, many slaves joined Union lines and served in the United States Colored Troops; Louisiana had more former slaves enlisted in the USCT than six other southern states combined.

During the course of the Civil War, the United States Navy would buy beef and groceries from a Union patriot named Duncan at the foot of Island 92.

Carroll Parish covered a large area and the parish was split by the state legislature in 1877, following the Reconstruction era. West Carroll Parish, with territory west of the Bayou Macon, was majority-white and voted Democratic.

After the war, this area continued to be dominated by agriculture and was largely rural. Numerous black Union veterans settled in East Carroll Parish and some owned their own land, especially in an area called Soldiers' Rest, site of a former Union camp. They developed an independent community. With blacks outnumbering whites in Carroll Parish by a seven-to-one margin, and with combat experience, they resisted efforts in the 1870s to suppress their population. Voters in the larger Carroll Parrish elected blacks to the positions of sheriff, state representative, clerk of the court, and several justices of the peace, and hired black constables, giving blacks a voice at the local level.

But white conservative Democrats formed groups noted as Bulldozers, conducting violence against black voters, teachers, and supporters to suppress their activities. White conservatives succeeded in regaining control of the state legislature by the end of Reconstruction. By creating West Carroll Parish in 1877, they had an additional jurisdiction dominated by white Democrats.

Two decades later, at the end of the 19th century, the state legislature passed a new constitution in 1898 that raised barriers to voter registration, with rules applied against African Americans. They were effectively disenfranchised well into the 1960s. The legislature passed segregation and Jim Crow laws of increasing severity into the early 20th century.

In 1907 U.S. President Theodore Roosevelt came to East Carroll Parish near Lake Providence for a black bear hunt. When a particular bear managed to elude the hunters, the president's camp was moved to Bear Lake in Madison Parish near Tallulah. The 21-year-old Arthur Spencer of Richland Parish took a photograph of Roosevelt with the heavily armed hunting party. Among the hunters was John M. Parker, future governor of Louisiana and the vice-presidential choice of the Bull Moose Party ticket in the 1912 presidential election.

== Law and government ==
From 1922 to 1962, African Americans were prohibited from registering to vote in East Carroll Parish through a combination of laws and practices such as literacy tests. The first African Americans were registered after the ruling in U.S. v. Manning (1962) found that the prohibition of voter registration for Black people violated the Civil Rights Act of 1960. It was not, however, until the Voting Rights Act of 1965 became law that large numbers of African Americans became registered to vote, and they continued to vote at high levels. They have tended to support Democratic Party candidates, as the national party had supported the civil rights movement. As East Carroll Parish is majority black, its voters still favor Democratic Party candidates. Most conservative whites have shifted since the late 20th century to the Republican Party, which candidates dominate elections in majority-white areas of the state.

In 1988, Governor Michael S. Dukakis of Massachusetts carried East Carroll Parish over then Vice President George Herbert Walker Bush, 1,809 votes (52.3 percent) to 1,536 (44.4 percent). In the 2004 presidential race, East Carroll gave the Democratic John Kerry/John Edwards slate 1,980 ballots (58 percent) to 1,357 votes (40 percent) for the George W. Bush/Richard B. Cheney slate.

In 2012, U.S. President Barack H. Obama swept the parish with 2,478 votes (61.8 percent) to Republican Mitt Romney's 1,508 (37.6 percent). In 2008, Obama had handily defeated John McCain in East Carroll Parish, 2,267 (63.7 percent) to 1,254 (35.2 percent).

== Geography ==
According to the U.S. Census Bureau, the parish has a total area of 442 square miles (1,140 km^{2}), of which 421 square miles (1,090 km^{2}) is land and 22 square miles (57 km^{2}) (4.9%) is water.

=== Major highways ===
- U.S. Highway 65
- Louisiana Highway 2
- Louisiana Highway 132
- Louisiana Highway 134
- Louisiana Highway 577
- Louisiana Highway 579
- Louisiana Highway 580
- Louisiana Highway 581
- Louisiana Highway 582
- Louisiana Highway 585
- Louisiana Highway 596
- Louisiana Highway 877
- Louisiana Highway 881
- Louisiana Highway 883-1
- Louisiana Highway 883-2
- Louisiana Highway 887
- Louisiana Highway 3181

=== Adjacent counties and parishes ===
- Chicot County, Arkansas (north)
- Issaquena County, Mississippi (east)
- Warren County, Mississippi (southeast)
- Madison Parish (south)
- Richland Parish (southwest)
- West Carroll Parish (west)

== Communities ==
=== Towns ===
- Lake Providence (parish seat and only municipality)

=== Unincorporated communities ===
- Alsatia
- Gassoway
- Millikin
- Shelburn
- Sondheimer
- Transylvania

=== Extinct settlements ===
- Goodrich's Landing

== Demographics ==
Historical population
Census	Pop.	Note	%±
1880	12,134		—
1890	12,362		1.9%
1900	11,373		−8.0%
1910	11,637		2.3%
1920	11,231		−3.5%
1930	15,815		40.8%
1940	19,023		20.3%
1950	16,302		−14.3%
1960	14,433		−11.5%
1970	12,884		−10.7%
1980	11,772		−8.6%
1990	9,709		−17.5%
2000	9,421		−3.0%
2010	7,759		−17.6%
2020	7,459		−3.9%
2025 (est.)	6,760	▼	−9.4%
U.S. Decennial Census; 1790–1960 1900–1990; 1990–2000 2010

East Carroll Parish, Louisiana – Racial and ethnic composition Note: the US Census treats Hispanic/Latino as an ethnic category. This table excludes Latinos from the racial categories and assigns them to a separate category. Hispanics/Latinos may be of any race.
Race / ethnicity (NH = Non-Hispanic)	Pop 1980	Pop 1990	Pop 2000	Pop 2010	Pop 2020	% 1980	% 1990	% 2000	% 2010	% 2020
White alone (NH)	4,347	3,296	2,933	2,198	2,034	36.93%	33.95%	31.13%	28.33%	27.27%
Black or African American alone (NH)	7,105	6,269	6,297	5,324	5,164	60.36%	64.57%	66.84%	68.62%	69.23%
Native American or Alaska Native alone (NH)	1	4	17	16	2	0.01%	0.04%	0.18%	0.21%	0.03%
Asian alone (NH)	40	20	31	44	17	0.34%	0.21%	0.33%	0.57%	0.23%
Native Hawaiian or Pacific Islander alone (NH)	x	x	0	0	0	x	x	0.00%	0.00%	0.00%
Other race alone (NH)	4	0	2	0	5	0.03%	0.00%	0.02%	0.00%	0.07%
Mixed race or Multiracial (NH)	x	x	29	50	122	x	x	0.31%	0.64%	1.64%
Hispanic or Latino (any race)	275	120	112	127	115	2.34%	1.24%	1.19%	1.64%	1.54%
Total	11,772	9,709	9,421	7,759	7,459	100.00%	100.00%	100.00%	100.00%	100.00%

=== 2020 census ===
As of the 2020 census, there were 7,459 people in the parish. The median age was 36.0 years, 20.9% of residents were under the age of 18, and 14.8% of residents were 65 years of age or older. For every 100 females there were 139.3 males, and for every 100 females age 18 and over there were 152.4 males age 18 and over.

The racial makeup of the parish was 27.5% White, 69.6% Black or African American, <0.1% American Indian and Alaska Native, 0.3% Asian, <0.1% Native Hawaiian and Pacific Islander, 0.5% from some other race, and 2.1% from two or more races. Hispanic or Latino residents of any race comprised 1.5% of the population. Of Louisiana's 64 parishes, it was one of six that had an African-American majority in 2020.

<0.1% of residents lived in urban areas, while 100.0% lived in rural areas.

There were 2,375 households in the parish, of which 33.1% had children under the age of 18 living in them. Of all households, 28.5% were married-couple households, 23.5% were households with a male householder and no spouse or partner present, and 40.9% were households with a female householder and no spouse or partner present. About 32.7% of all households were made up of individuals and 14.5% had someone living alone who was 65 years of age or older. There were 2,791 housing units, of which 14.9% were vacant. Among occupied housing units, 58.0% were owner-occupied and 42.0% were renter-occupied. The homeowner vacancy rate was 1.1% and the rental vacancy rate was 6.5%.

=== Economy and poverty data ===
East Carroll Parish is still largely agricultural, with 74% of its land devoted to crops. As farm labor needs have been reduced by mechanization and farms have been consolidated into larger units, jobs in the area have been reduced. Agriculture may take the form of aquaculture, and row crops.

Of 3,197 counties ranked by the U.S. Census Bureau in 2011 for "estimated percent of people of all ages in poverty", East Carroll Parish was fifth. It was estimated that 44 percent of the rural county's residents lived in poverty.

== Education ==
Public schools in East Carroll Parish are operated by the East Carroll Parish School Board, which covers the entire parish. In an infographic released by Graphiq, East Carroll Parish is ranked as the least educated parish in Louisiana with 32.29% of 25 year-olds without a high school diploma and 9.4% of 25 year-olds with a bachelor's degree or higher.

== Notable people ==
- Buddy Caldwell, District Attorney of the Sixth Judicial District in East Carroll, elected in 2007 as the attorney general of Louisiana, serving into 2016
- William J. Jefferson, former U.S. representative from Louisiana's 2nd congressional district, was born in Lake Providence. He was convicted of corruption in 2012; in 2017, seven of 10 charges against him were dropped and he was released from prison.
- Joseph Ransdell, a Democrat who served in Congress from 1913 to 1931. Ransdell was born in Alexandria but resided for many years in Lake Providence.
- Norris C. Williamson, state senator from 1916 to 1932; advocate of cotton planter interest and worked to gain state funding to eradicate the cattle tick
- John D. Winters, historian at Louisiana Tech University, author of The Civil War in Louisiana (1963), was reared in Lake Providence
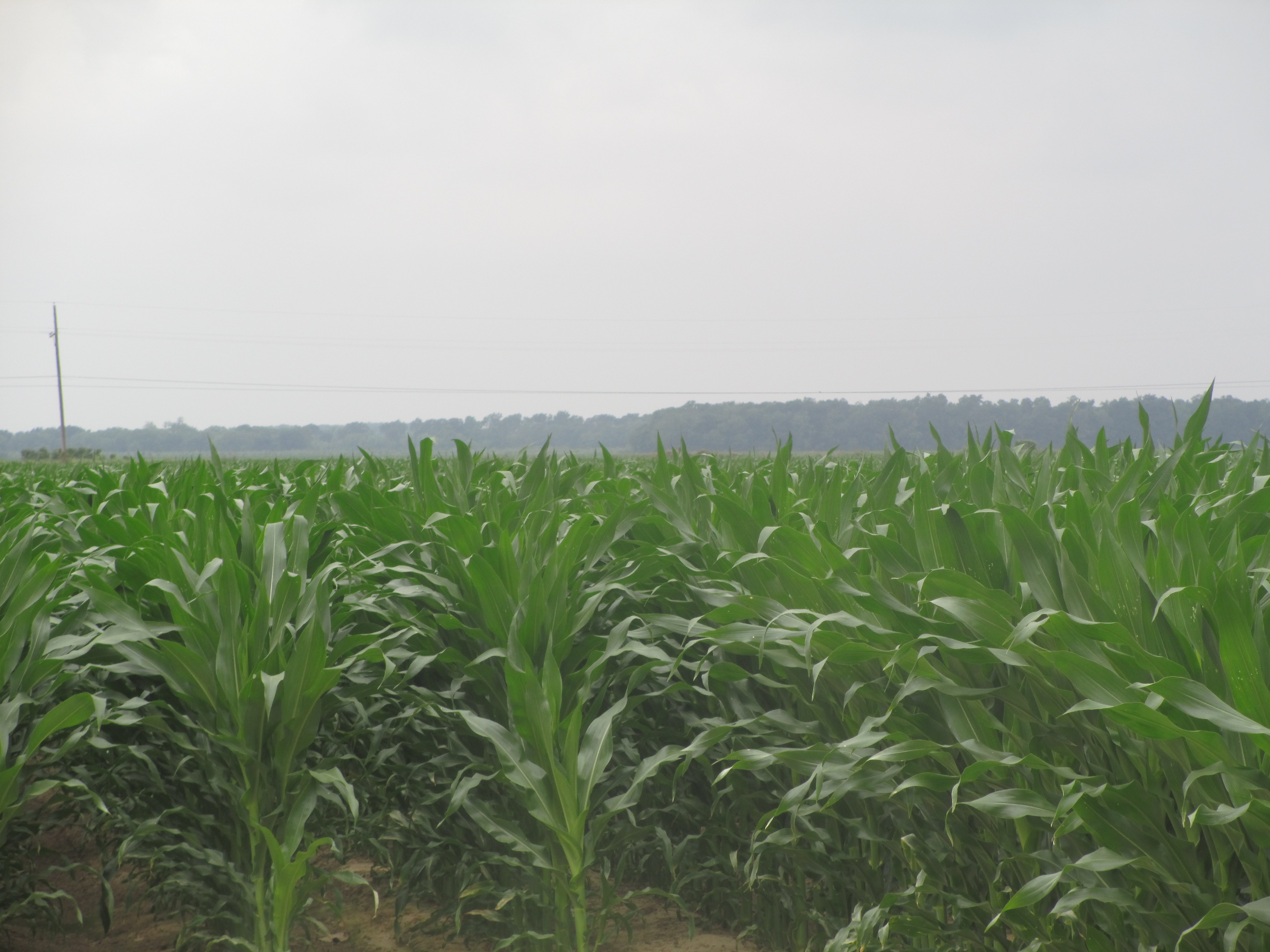
Beginning corn crop (2013) surrounds both sides of the Louisiana State Cotton Museum in Lake Providence

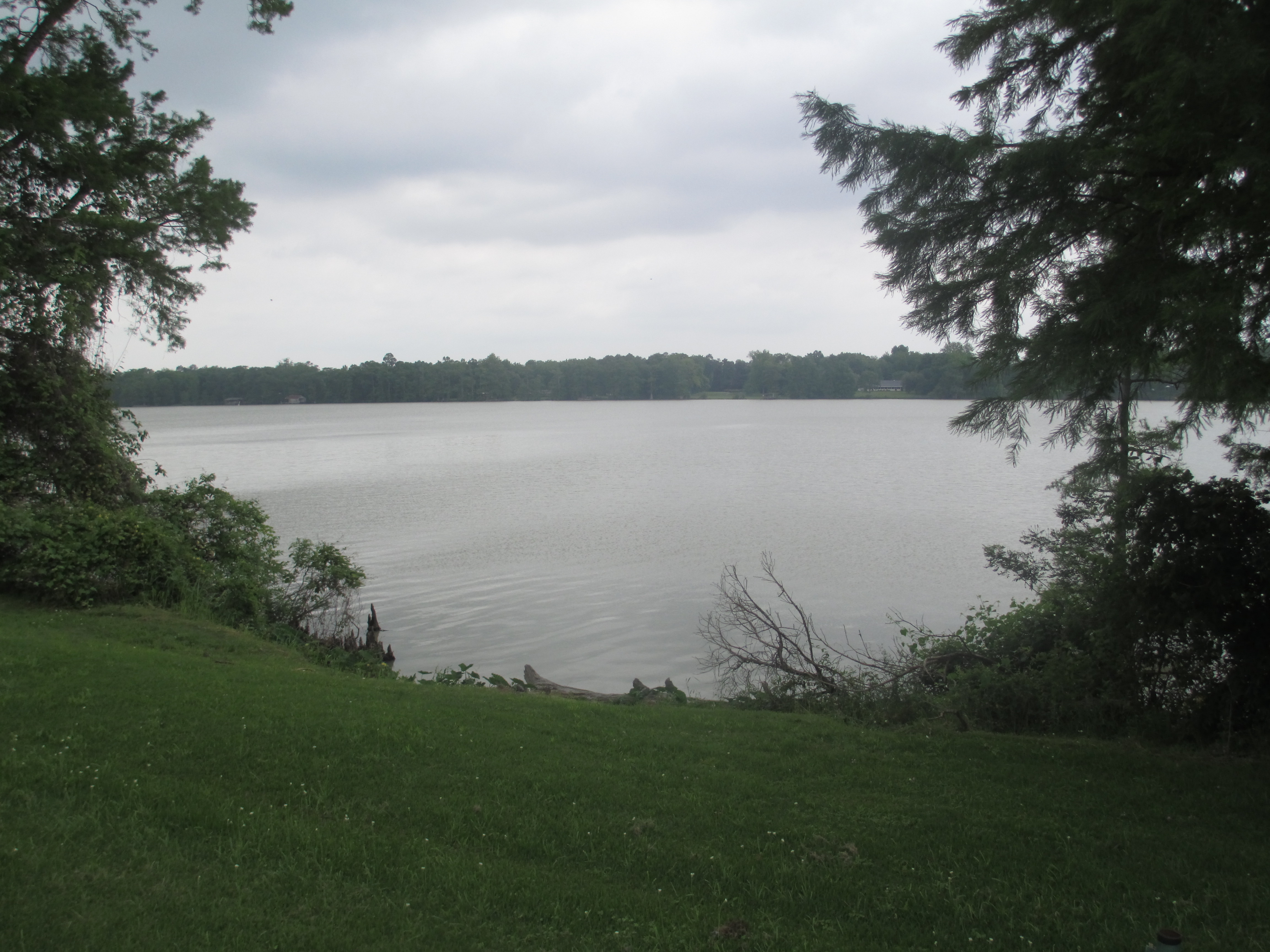
The city of Lake Providence is named for the oxbow lake

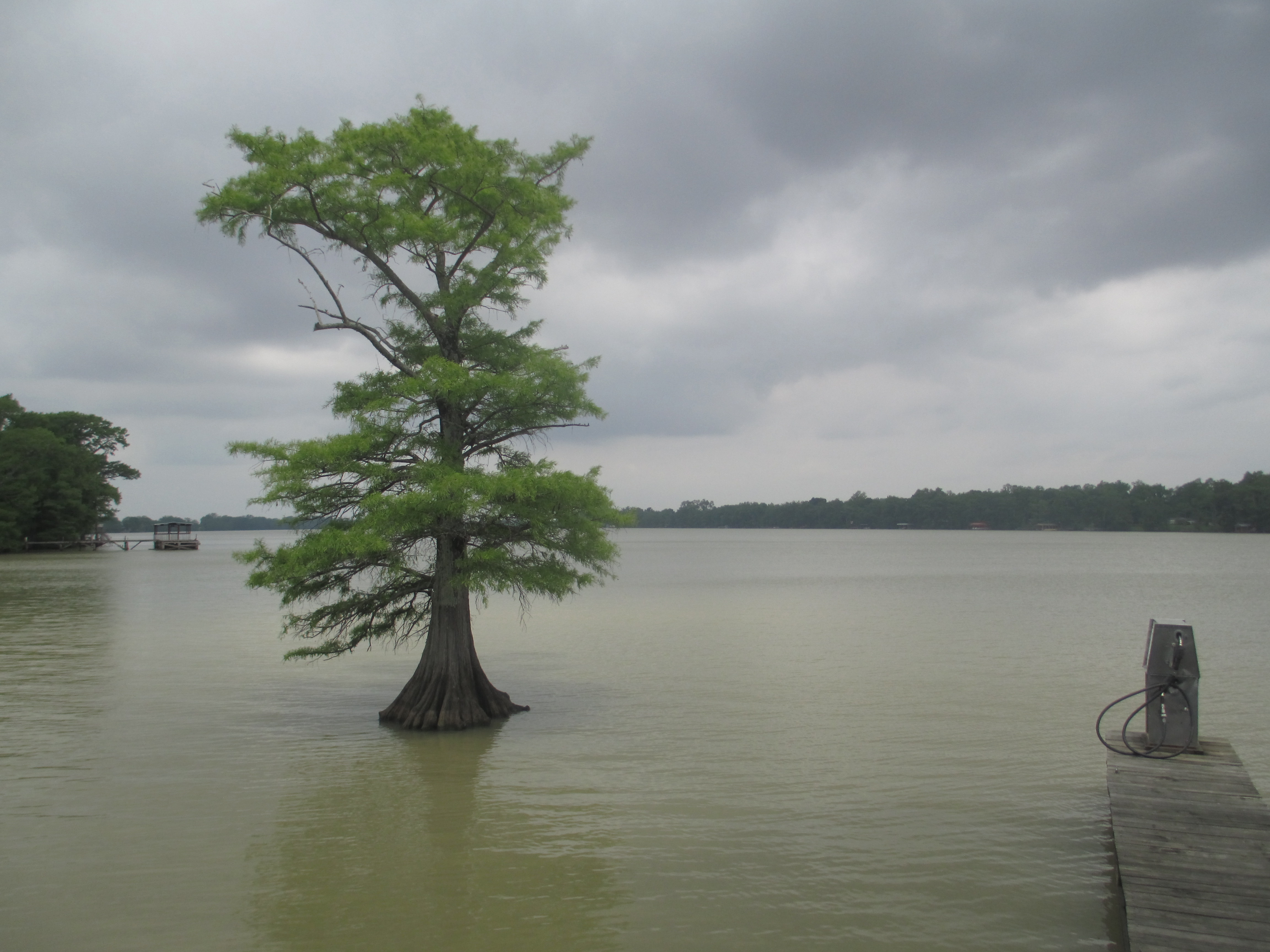
A dock on Lake Providence

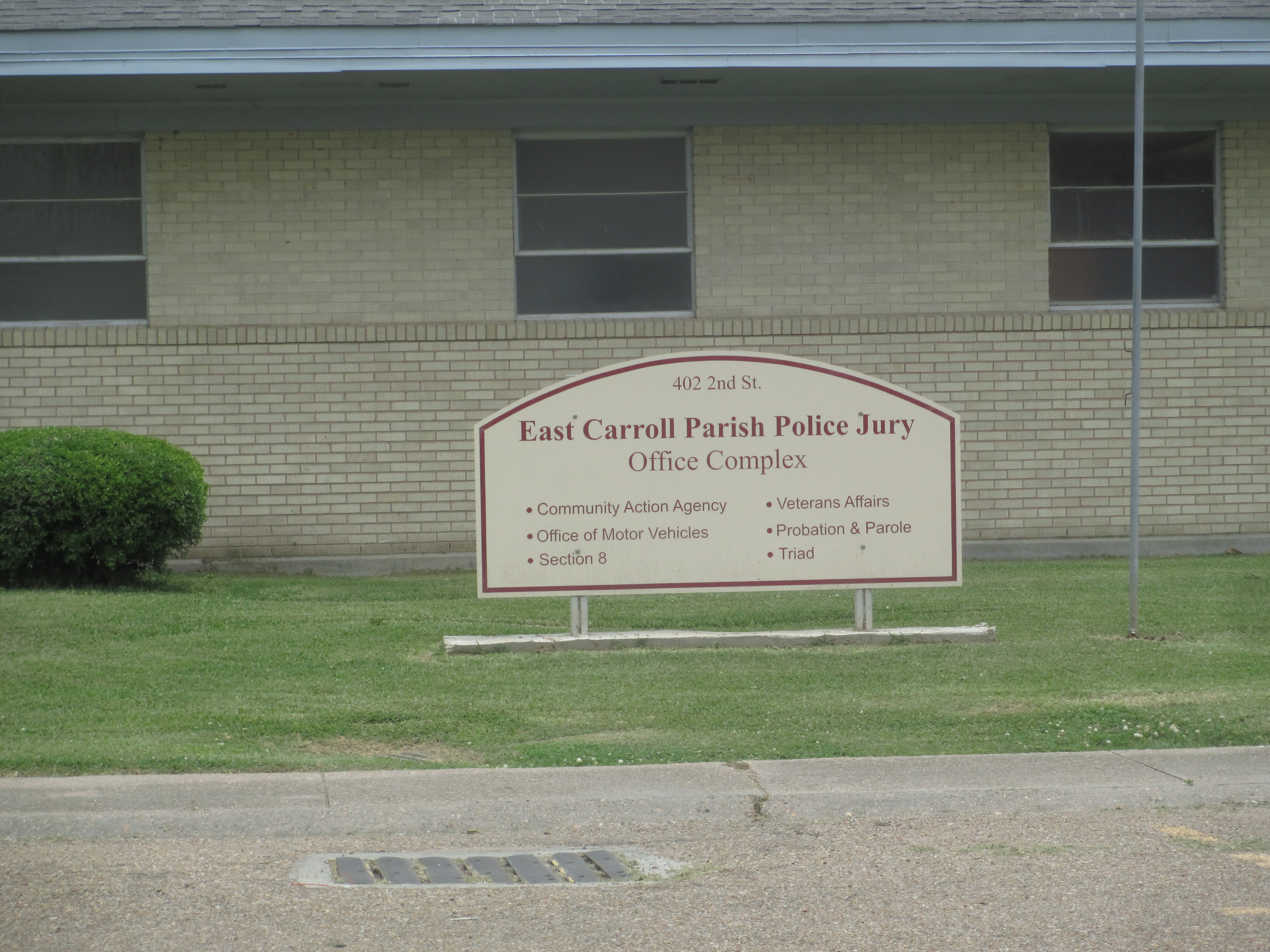
The East Carroll Parish Police Jury office complex in Lake Providence

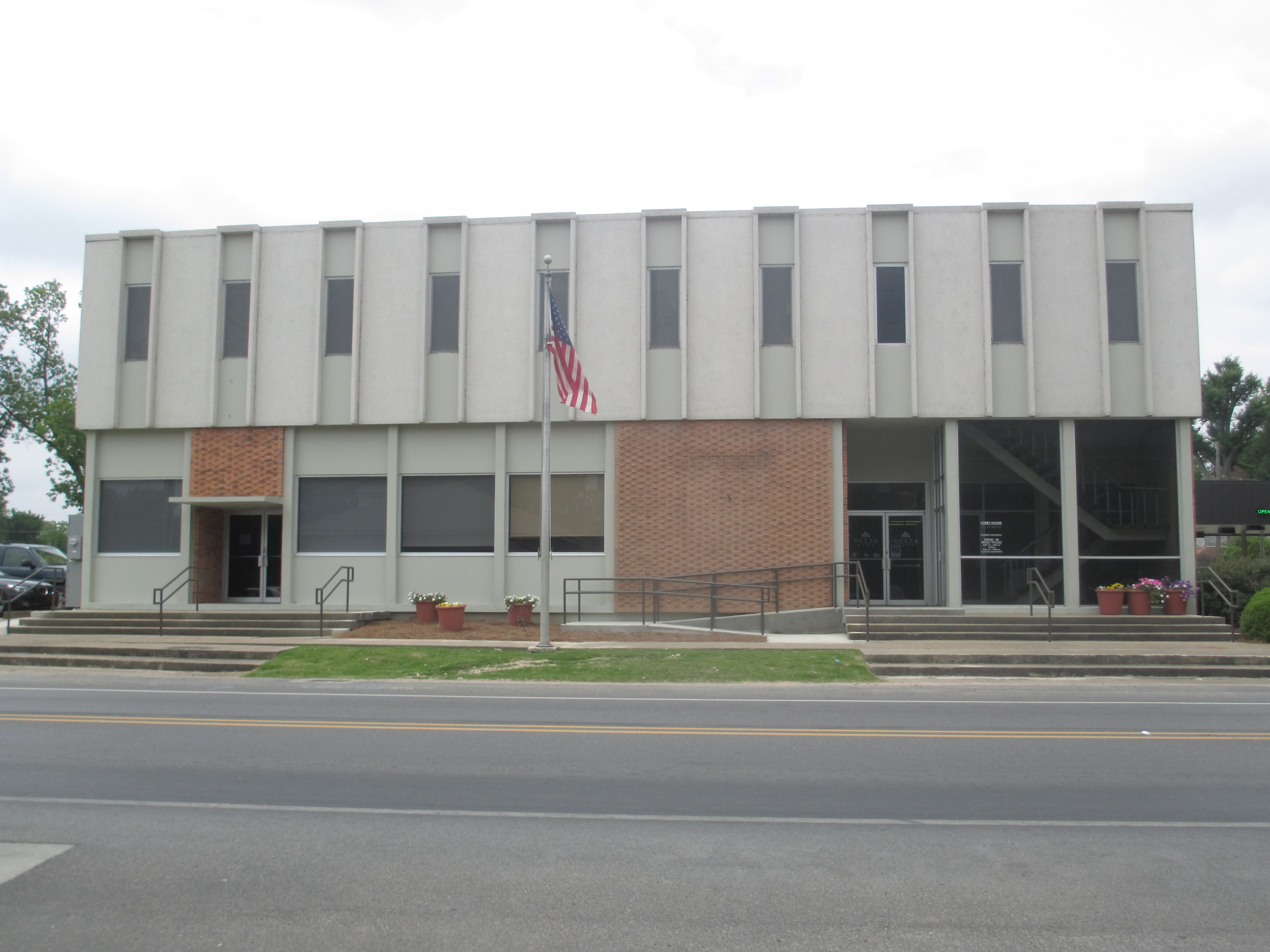
Delta Bank in downtown Lake Providence

== Politics ==
Unlike neighbouring West Carroll Parish, and Louisiana generally, East Carroll Parish is a Democratic stronghold, owing primarily to its majority African-American population. It was one of just two parishes (the other being Orleans Parish, home to New Orleans) to support the Democratic candidate in the 1999 Louisiana gubernatorial election. Furthermore, in presidential elections, it has not supported a Republican since 1972, when Republican incumbent Richard Nixon carried 63 of the state's 64 parishes, and East Carroll was still Nixon's fourth weakest parish in the state. East Carroll rejected Ronald Reagan in both 1980 and 1984. In 2000, it had been Al Gore's fourth best parish statewide. However, East Carroll was previously known to support third-party segregationists. In 1948, it gave Strom Thurmond over 60% of the vote (Republican candidate Thomas Dewey won less than a fifth as many votes as Thurmond). In 1960, it gave a plurality to George Wallace of Alabama. And in 1964, the parish gave 85% of its vote to Republican Barry Goldwater, who lost in a landslide to Lyndon Johnson nationally, compared to just 15% for Lyndon Johnson. Before 1964, like most of the south, East Carroll was powerfully Democratic, giving just 3 votes to Republican Charles Evans Hughes, and even giving 77% of its vote to Al Smith, who performed considerably worse in the south than past Democratic candidates, losing traditionally Democratic strongholds including Texas, Florida and North Carolina. In 1996 the Parish saw a leftward swing in favor of Bill Clinton; his performance in this election was the best by a Democrat since 1944. East Carroll maintained a strong support for Democrats after this; in 2008 it highly favored Democrat Barack Obama who again broke this record. In 2012 Obama won more votes than Bill Clinton in 1996, and in 2016 Hillary Clinton won more votes than her husband, Bill Clinton, had won in 1992 (albeit by a very thin margin of three votes). In 2020, Joe Biden performed slightly better than Hillary had, and then in 2024 the Parish saw a shift to the right; Kamala Harris' performance in this election was the worst by a Democrat since 2000.

United States presidential election results for East Carroll Parish, Louisiana
Year	Republican		Democratic		Third party(ies)	
Year	No.	%	No.	%	No.	%
1912	4	2.14%	161	86.10%	22	11.76%
1916	3	1.35%	219	98.65%	0	0.00%
1920	8	3.14%	247	96.86%	0	0.00%
1924	71	20.40%	277	79.60%	0	0.00%
1928	130	22.97%	436	77.03%	0	0.00%
1932	24	3.10%	751	96.90%	0	0.00%
1936	95	10.49%	811	89.51%	0	0.00%
1940	270	20.85%	1,025	79.15%	0	0.00%
1944	357	27.85%	925	72.15%	0	0.00%
1948	116	10.51%	323	29.26%	665	60.24%
1952	757	45.19%	918	54.81%	0	0.00%
1956	415	30.81%	545	40.46%	387	28.73%
1960	448	29.40%	364	23.88%	712	46.72%
1964	1,486	84.96%	263	15.04%	0	0.00%
1968	586	13.89%	1,926	45.66%	1,706	40.45%
1972	1,736	48.40%	1,661	46.31%	190	5.30%
1976	1,681	40.43%	2,367	56.93%	110	2.65%
1980	1,867	44.13%	2,283	53.96%	81	1.91%
1984	1,974	47.77%	2,089	50.56%	69	1.67%
1988	1,536	44.39%	1,809	52.28%	115	3.32%
1992	1,142	33.84%	1,835	54.37%	398	11.79%
1996	1,008	29.55%	2,149	63.00%	254	7.45%
2000	1,280	39.45%	1,876	57.81%	89	2.74%
2004	1,357	39.97%	1,980	58.32%	58	1.71%
2008	1,254	35.23%	2,267	63.70%	38	1.07%
2012	1,508	37.62%	2,478	61.83%	22	0.55%
2016	1,059	36.03%	1,838	62.54%	42	1.43%
2020	1,080	35.57%	1,900	62.58%	56	1.84%
2024	931	40.37%	1,338	58.02%	37	1.60%

== See also ==
- National Register of Historic Places listings in East Carroll Parish, Louisiana
