= Collinston, Louisiana =

- Village
- Location in Morehouse Parish, Louisiana

- Location of Louisiana in the United States
- Coordinates: 32°41′22″N 91°52′28″W
- Country: United States
- State: Louisiana
- Parish: Morehouse

Area
  - Total: 1.13 sq mi (2.92 km^{2})
  - Land: 1.13 sq mi (2.92 km^{2})
  - Water: 0 sq mi (0.00 km^{2})
- Elevation: 79 ft (24 m)

Population (2020)
  - Total: 274
  - Density: 243/sq mi (93.9/km^{2})
- Time zone: UTC-6 (CST)
  - Summer (DST): UTC-5 (CDT)
- Area code: 318
- FIPS code: 22-16655
- GNIS feature ID: 2407436

Collinston is a village in Morehouse Parish, Louisiana, United States. The population was 274 at the 2020 census.

== History ==
Very little is known about the Collinston's early history, but it is believed that it was a spanish territory in the 1700s. Originally, Collinston was within Ouachita Parish until the formation of Morehouse Parish in 1844. After an increase in population during and after the Civil War, Collinston was finally granted its charter and became incorporated as a village in 1904. Although the area was not included in the 1900 United States census, it is estimated that the population at that time was 300.

The original city hall at 4628 Main St was built in 1928. Since the early 2000s it has served as a local museum.

The population of Collinston peaked in 1950 at 546 people. Since then it has seen a gradual decline, with an estimated population of only 227 as of 2022.

== Geography ==
Collinston is located in southern Morehouse Parish 7 miles (11 km) southeast of Bastrop, the parish seat, and 23 miles (37 km) northeast of Monroe.

According to the United States Census Bureau, the village has a total area of 1.13 square miles (2.93 km^{2}), all land.

== Demographics ==
Historical population
Census	Pop.	Note	%±
1910	333		—
1920	354		6.3%
1930	473		33.6%
1940	482		1.9%
1950	546		13.3%
1960	497		−9.0%
1970	397		−20.1%
1980	439		10.6%
1990	375		−14.6%
2000	327		−12.8%
2010	287		−12.2%
2020	274		−4.5%
2025 (est.)	256	▼	−6.6%
U.S. Decennial Census

As of the census of 2000, there were 327 people, 132 households, and 83 families residing in the village. The population density was 290.5 inhabitants per square mile (112.2/km^{2}). There were 149 housing units at an average density of 132.4 per square mile (51.1/km^{2}). The racial makeup of the village was 53.82% White, 45.87% African American, and 0.31% from two or more races. Hispanic or Latino of any race were 3.36% of the population.

There were 132 households, out of which 24.2% had children under the age of 18 living with them, 40.2% were married couples living together, 18.2% had a female householder with no husband present, and 36.4% were non-families. 32.6% of all households were made up of individuals, and 14.4% had someone living alone who was 65 years of age or older. The average household size was 2.48 and the average family size was 3.18.

In the village, the population was spread out, with 24.2% under the age of 18, 11.3% from 18 to 24, 23.2% from 25 to 44, 25.4% from 45 to 64, and 15.9% who were 65 years of age or older. The median age was 39 years. For every 100 females, there were 90.1 males. For every 100 females age 18 and over, there were 77.1 males.

The median income for a household in the village was $17,500, and the median income for a family was $31,042. Males had a median income of $29,844 versus $15,000 for females. The per capita income for the village was $11,686. About 20.9% of families and 31.8% of the population were below the poverty line, including 50.0% of those under age 18 and 21.1% of those age 65 or over.
