= Madison Parish Courthouse =

- U.S. National Register of Historic Places
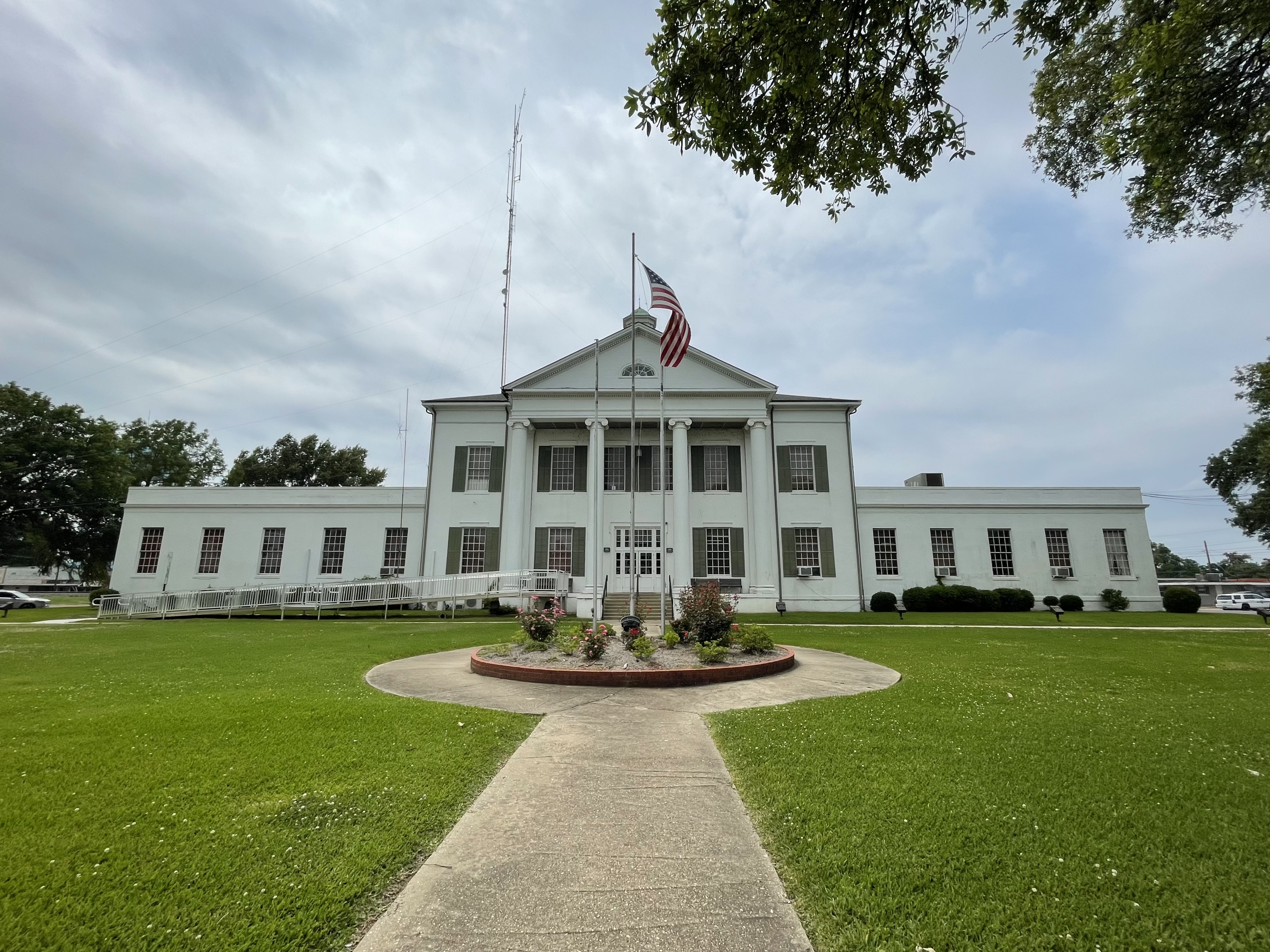

- Location within Louisiana Location within the United States
- Interactive map showing the location of Madison Parish Courthouse
- Location: 100 North Cedar Street, Tallulah, Louisiana
- Coordinates: 32°24′30″N 91°11′15″W
- Area: 3 acres (1.2 ha)
- Built: 1939
- Built by: M.T. Reed Construction Co.
- Architect: J.W. Smith & Associates
- Architectural style: Colonial Revival
- NRHP reference No.: 89000044
- Added to NRHP: February 21, 1989

The Madison Parish Courthouse, located at 100 North Cedar Street in downtown Tallulah in Madison Parish, Louisiana, was built in 1939. It was listed on the National Register of Historic Places on February 21, 1989.

It is a two-story stucco-over-masonry Colonial Revival building. Its main part is a five bays wide and has a hip roof. It has an Ionic portico with a lunette in its tympanum. It is topped by a two-stage English Baroque-style cupola with an octagonal lantern with round arch openings and an ogee cap. Side wings with parapets were added later.

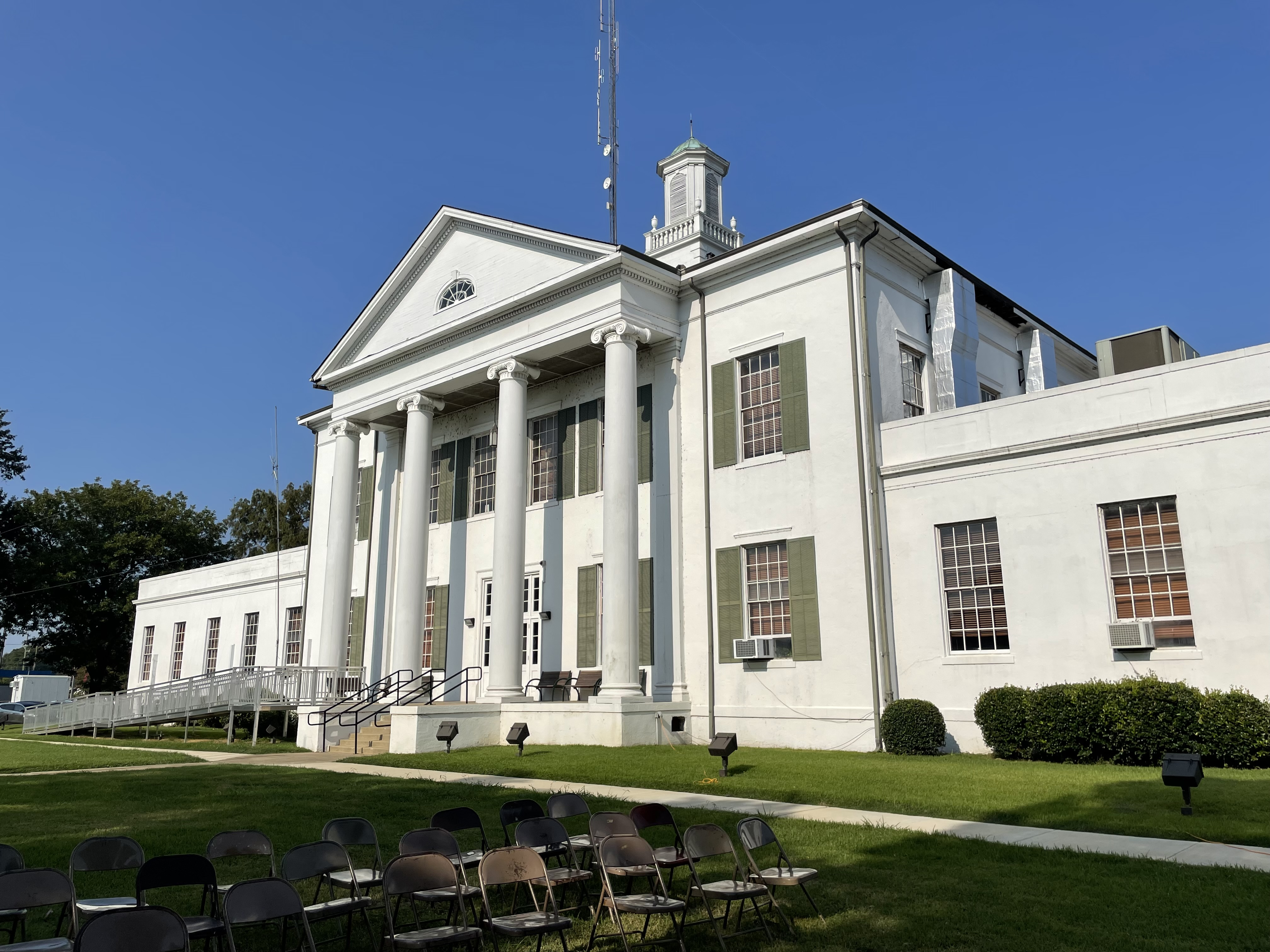
The Madison Parish Courthouse in Tallulah, Louisiana after a 9/11 Memorial Ceremony.

The building is a local landmark, and has one of only two pedimented porticos in Tallulah.

It was designed by architects J.W. Smith & Associates. J.W. Smith also designed two NRHP-listed high schools: Bastrop High School, in Bastrop, Louisiana and Mer Rouge High School in Mer Rouge, Louisiana. It was built by contractor M.T. Reed Construction Co.

== See also ==
- National Register of Historic Places listings in Madison Parish, Louisiana
