= National Register of Historic Places listings in Morehouse Parish, Louisiana =

Location of Morehouse Parish in Louisiana

This is a list of the National Register of Historic Places listings in Morehouse Parish, Louisiana.

This is intended to be a complete list of the properties on the National Register of Historic Places in Morehouse Parish, Louisiana, United States. The locations of National Register properties for which the latitude and longitude coordinates are included below, may be seen in a map.

There are 9 properties listed on the National Register in the parish.

This National Park Service list is complete through NPS recent listings posted July 18, 2025.

== Current listings ==
	Name on the Register	Image	Date listed	Location	City or town	Description
1	Bastrop High School	Bastrop High School	December 20, 2002 (#02001544)	715 South Washington Street; 32°46′19″N 91°54′50″W	Bastrop	
2	Cedars Plantation	Cedars Plantation	May 19, 1976 (#76000965)	Along Lake Irwin Road, about 2.4 miles (3.9 km) southwest of Oak Ridge; 32°36′51″N 91°48′53″W	Oak Ridge vicinity	
3	Christ Episcopal Church	Christ Episcopal Church	July 22, 1982 (#82002781)	206 South Locust Street; 32°46′36″N 91°55′02″W	Bastrop	
4	Excelsior	Excelsior	September 7, 1989 (#89001387)	317 North Oak Street (LA 133); 32°37′37″N 91°46′22″W	Oak Ridge	
5	Mer Rouge High School	Mer Rouge High School	March 4, 2004 (#04000145)	500 South 14th Street; 32°46′20″N 91°47′44″W	Mer Rouge	
6	Morehouse Parish Courthouse	Morehouse Parish Courthouse	December 27, 2002 (#02001622)	100 East Madison Avenue; 32°46′40″N 91°54′50″W	Bastrop	
7	Rose Theatre	Rose Theatre	September 8, 1987 (#87001474)	102 East Jefferson Avenue; 32°46′37″N 91°54′51″W	Bastrop	
8	Snyder House	Snyder House	October 18, 1996 (#96001165)	1620 East Madison Avenue; 32°46′47″N 91°53′45″W	Bastrop	
9	Walnut Grove		September 27, 2007 (#07001007)	9069 Oak Ridge Road, about 1.3 miles (2.1 km) south of Mer Rouge; 32°45′26″N 91°47′12″W	Mer Rouge vicinity	

== See also ==
- List of National Historic Landmarks in Louisiana
- National Register of Historic Places listings in Louisiana
