= Snyder Memorial Museum and Creative Arts Center =

- Snyder House
- U.S. National Register of Historic Places
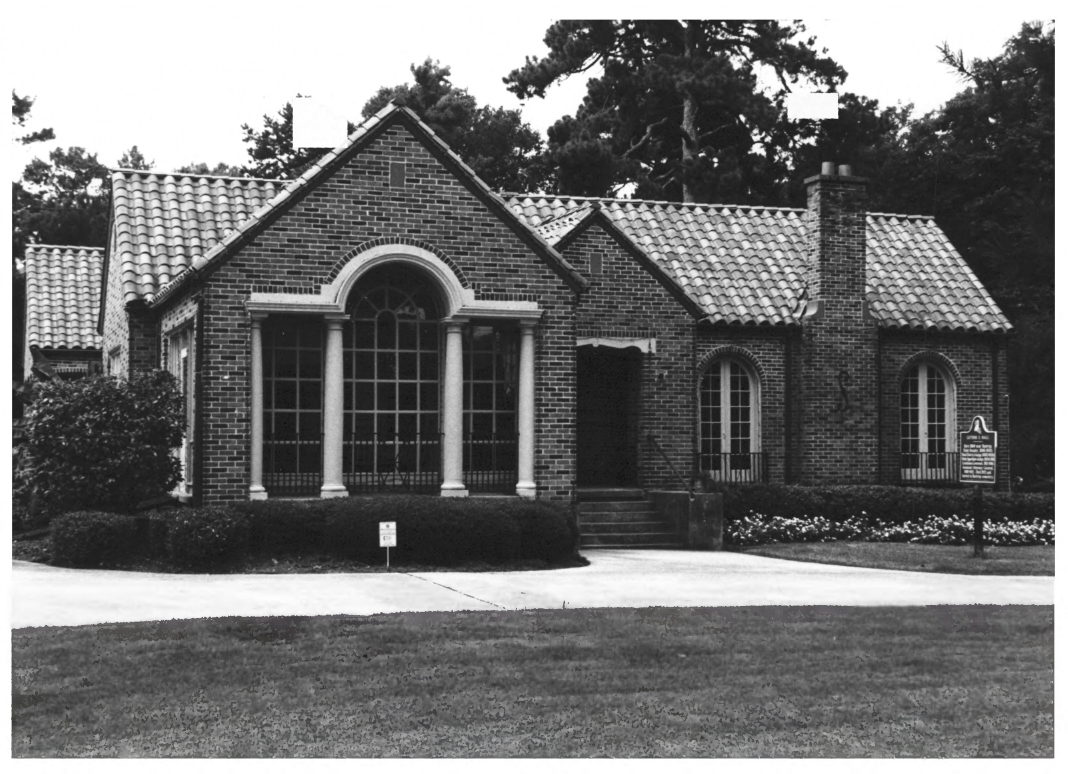

- Location within Louisiana Location within the United States
- Location: 1620 East Madison Avenue, Bastrop, Louisiana
- Coordinates: 32°46′47″N 91°53′45″W
- Area: 2.2 acres (0.89 ha)
- Built: 1929
- Built by: A.G. McBride
- Architect: H.H. Land, Sr.
- Architectural style: Tudor Revival, Italianate
- NRHP reference No.: 96001165
- Added to NRHP: October 18, 1996

The Snyder Memorial Museum and Creative Arts Center, formerly the Snyder House, at 1620 East Madison Avenue in Bastrop in Morehouse Parish in northern Louisiana, was built in 1929. It was listed on the National Register of Historic Places on October 18, 1996. The listing included two contributing buildings.

== Architecture ==
It was built in 1929 as a one-story brown and beige brick residence for Charles and Esther Snyder, with a tiled roof. According to its NRHP nomination, "The house is difficult to pigeonhole stylistically because it represents the eclecticism which characterized early twentieth architecture. It borrows from the "English cottage" style in its massing, but certain features give it an Italian or Mediterranean flavor. Although the Snyder House's many gables are not as steeply pitched as is typical of the "English cottage" style, its massing is perhaps best viewed within that tradition's penchant for a picturesque look. There are no less than eight gabled projections: two on the facade, one of which is an entrance porch, three on the eastern side elevation, two on the western side elevation, and a small one on the rear. Add to this a prominent front chimney (a favorite of the "English cottage" style). This "busy" massing and complex footprint belies the house's conventional central hall plan."

== See also ==
- National Register of Historic Places listings in Morehouse Parish, Louisiana
