= Walnut Grove (Mer Rouge, Louisiana) =

Historic house in Louisiana, United States

- U.S. National Register of Historic Places
- Location within Louisiana Location within the United States
- Location: 9069 Oak Ridge Road, about 1.3 miles (2.1 km) south of Mer Rouge
- Nearest city: Mer Rouge, Louisiana
- Coordinates: 32°45′26″N 91°47′12″W
- Area: less than one acre
- Built: c.1830
- NRHP reference No.: 07001007
- Added to NRHP: September 27, 2007

Walnut Grove, in the vicinity of Mer Rouge in Morehouse Parish in northern Louisiana, was listed on the National Register of Historic Places in 2007. It has also been known as White Haven and as White House.

The house was originally built in about 1830 and was developed into more or less full form by the 1880s. It was the home of Amelia Davenport Brown Clark (1822-1877).

== See also ==
- National Register of Historic Places listings in Morehouse Parish, Louisiana
