= Bastrop High School =

Bastrop High School may refer to:

- Bastrop High School (Bastrop, Louisiana), historic high school building listed on the National Register of Historic Places
- Bastrop High School (Louisiana), in Bastrop, Louisiana, the current high school
- Bastrop High School (Texas)
