= Rose Theatre (Bastrop, Louisiana) =

- U.S. National Register of Historic Places
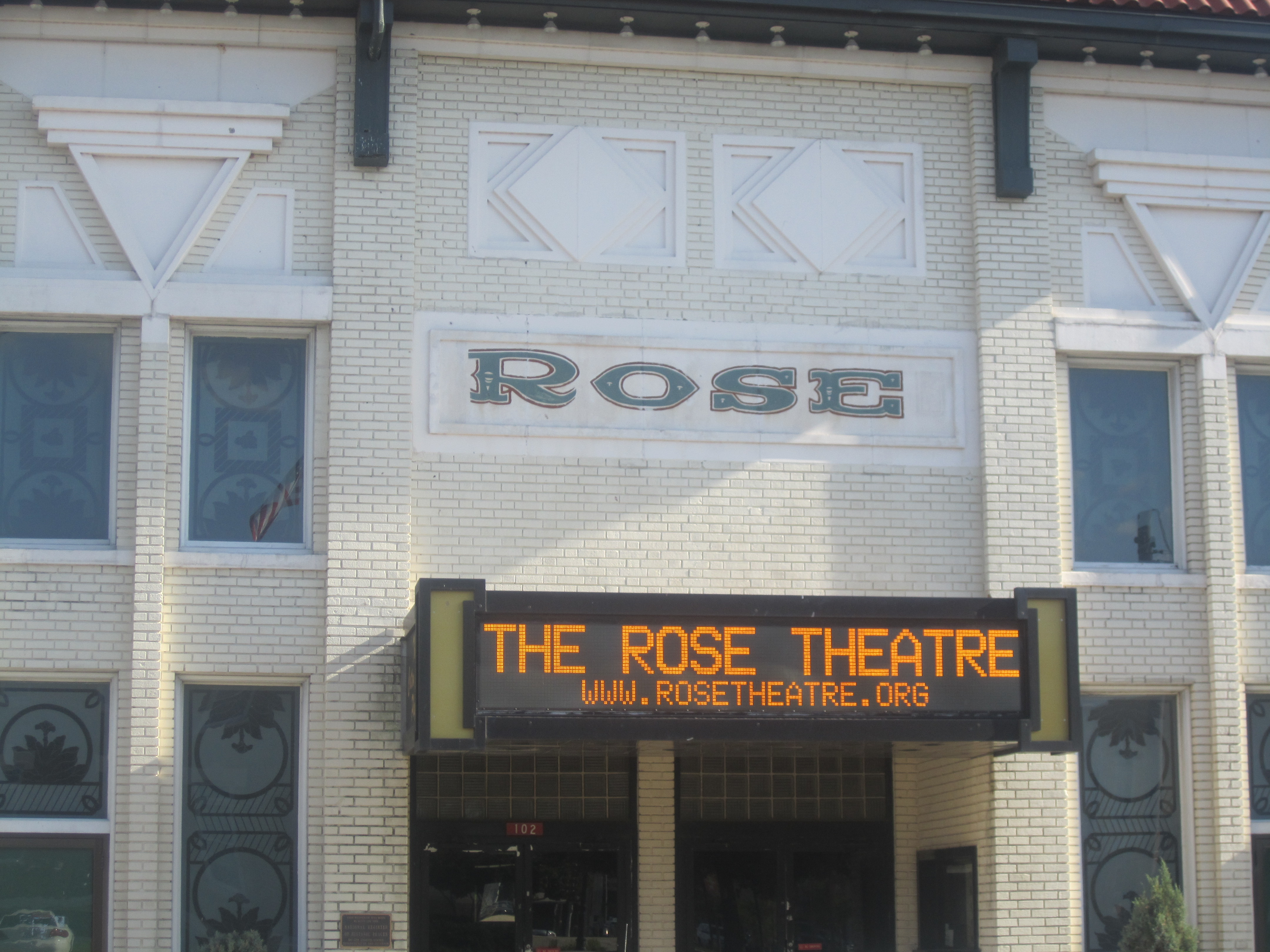

- Location within Louisiana Location within the United States
- Location: 102 East Jefferson Avenue, Bastrop, Louisiana
- Coordinates: 32°46′37″N 91°54′51″W
- Area: 0.2 acres (0.081 ha)
- Built: 1927
- Architect: C.J. Goodwin
- Architectural style: Bungalow/craftsman, Arts and Crafts
- NRHP reference No.: 87001474
- Added to NRHP: September 8, 1987

The Rose Theatre in downtown Bastrop in Morehouse Parish, Louisiana was built in 1927. It was listed on the National Register of Historic Places on September 8, 1987.

It is a two-story Arts and Crafts-style brick building. Its brickwork on its front facade was painted in a cream color in 1987 when the word "Rose", centered on the facade, was also repainted. Its sides and rear are common bond brick. Its auditorium has an upper gallery area which once served blacks separately.

== See also ==
- National Register of Historic Places listings in Morehouse Parish, Louisiana
