= Rose Theatre =

Rose Theatre may refer to:

== Canada ==
- Rose Theatre Brampton, a theatre in Brampton, Ontario

== United Kingdom ==
- The Rose (theatre), also called The Rose Playhouse, a historic theatre in Bankside, London, England, originally built in 1587, whose archaeological remains were rediscovered in 1989 and which subsequently re-opened as an exhibition space and theatre venue.
- Rose Theatre Kingston, a theatre in the Royal Borough of Kingston upon Thames, London, built in 2008
- Rose Theatre, a theatre in Edinburgh, Scotland, formerly the Charlotte Baptist Church

== United States ==
- Rose Theatre (Bastrop, Louisiana), a theatre on the National Register of Historic Places in Louisiana
- Rose Theatre, part of the Lincoln Center for the Performing Arts in New York City
- The Rose Blumkin Performing Arts Center in Omaha, Nebraska was known as "The Rose" for most of its existence
