= Christ Episcopal Church (Bastrop, Louisiana) =

Historic church in Louisiana, United States

- U.S. National Register of Historic Places
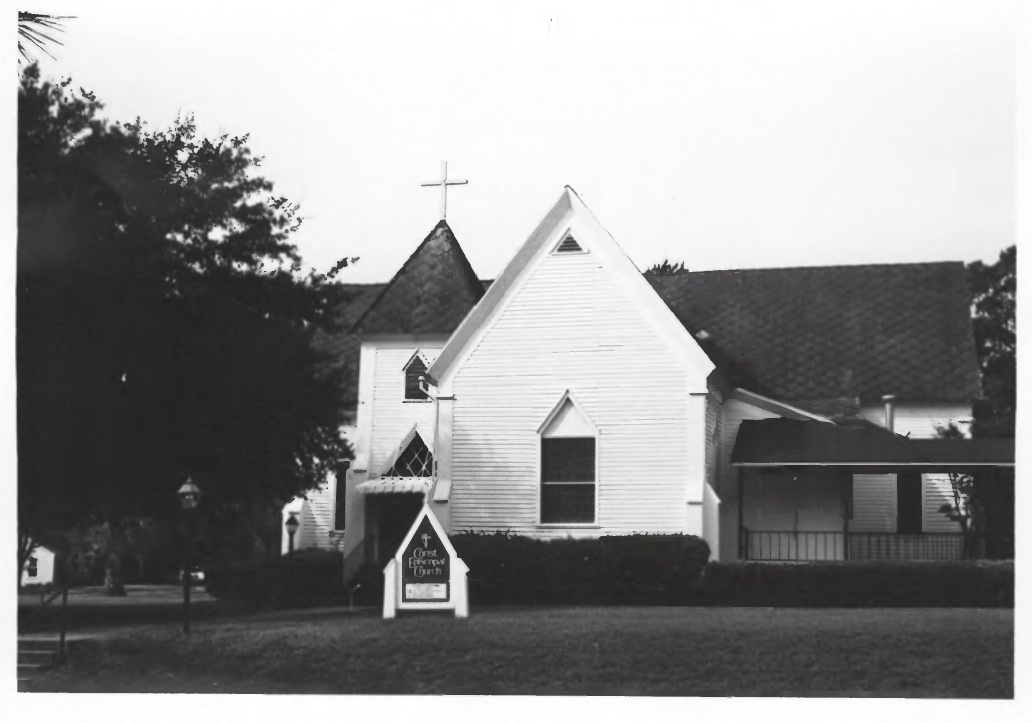

- Location within Louisiana Location within the United States
- Location: 206 South Locust Street, Bastrop, Louisiana
- Coordinates: 32°46′36″N 91°55′02″W
- Area: 0.3 acres (0.12 ha)
- Built: 1897
- Architectural style: Gothic Revival
- NRHP reference No.: 82002781
- Added to NRHP: July 22, 1982

Christ Episcopal Church is a historic Episcopal church building at 206 South Locust Street in Bastrop, Louisiana.

The Gothic Revival style building was constructed in 1897 and added to the National Register of Historic Places on July 22, 1982.

It has a cruciform plan, and the main entrance is through a square tower set into one corner. It has tall and narrow windows with triangular tops approximating pointed arches. As of 1982 the church was well-preserved; the only addition had been a c.1950 parish hall linked to the church by a covered walkway.

== See also ==
- National Register of Historic Places listings in Morehouse Parish, Louisiana
