= Bastrop Daily Enterprise =

American newspaper published in Louisiana

- Type: Daily newspaper
- Format: Broadsheet
- Owner: Gannett
- Publisher: Shane Allen
- Founded: c. 1904, as Morehouse Enterprise
- Ceased publication: March 29, 2019
- Headquarters: 119 East Hickory Avenue, Bastrop, Louisiana 71220, United States
- OCLC number: 17499849

The Bastrop Daily Enterprise was an American daily newspaper published in Bastrop, Louisiana. It was restarted as Bastrop Daily Enterprise on October 5, 1952. It was owned by Gannett. The newspaper closed on March 29, 2019, citing "shrinking advertising markets locally and nationally." The final issue was published on March 29, 2019.

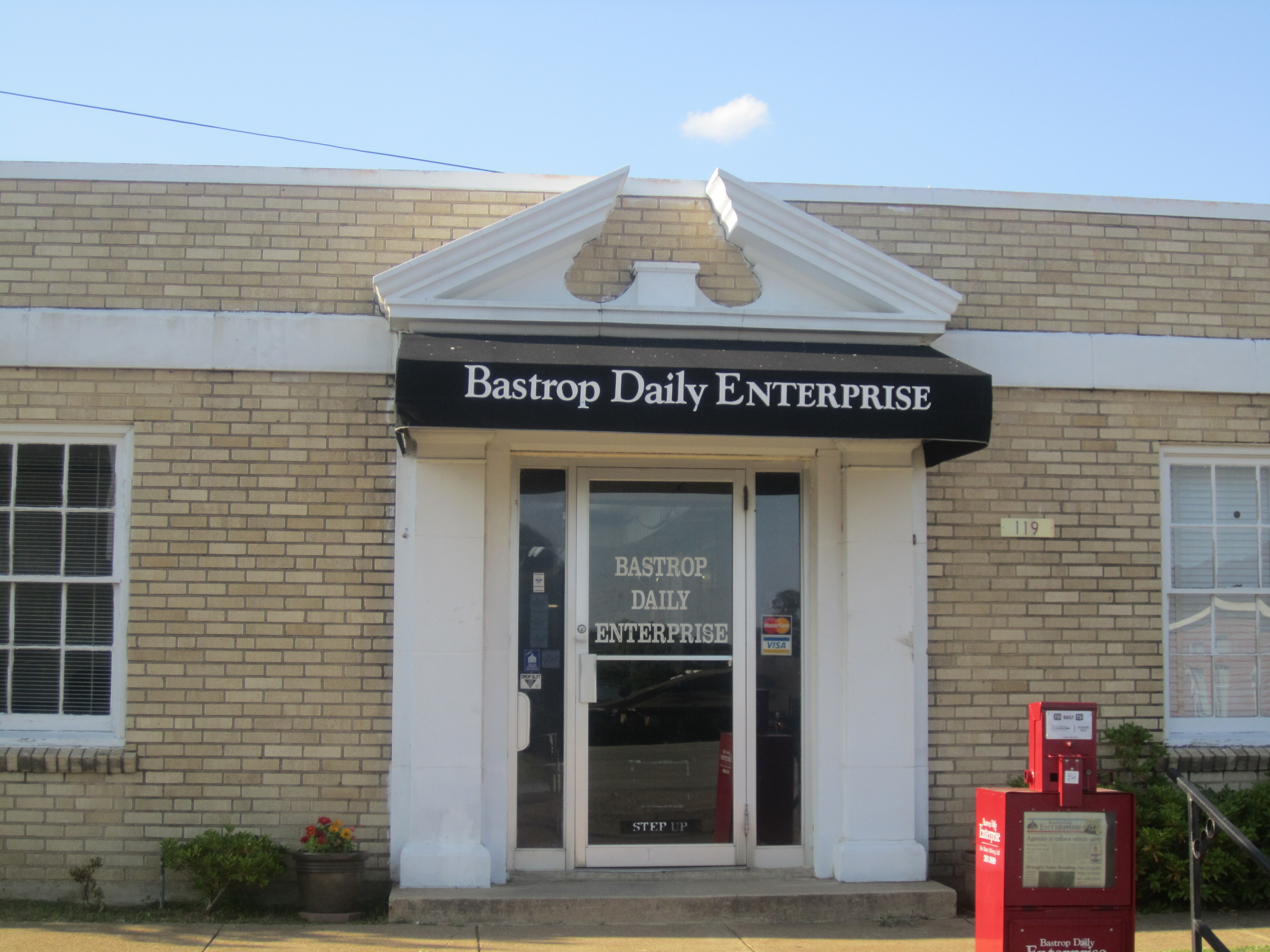
Bastrop Daily Enterprise newspaper office

The paper covered the city of Bastrop and Morehouse Parish.
