= Excelsior (Oak Ridge, Louisiana) =

Historic house in Louisiana, United States

- U.S. National Register of Historic Places
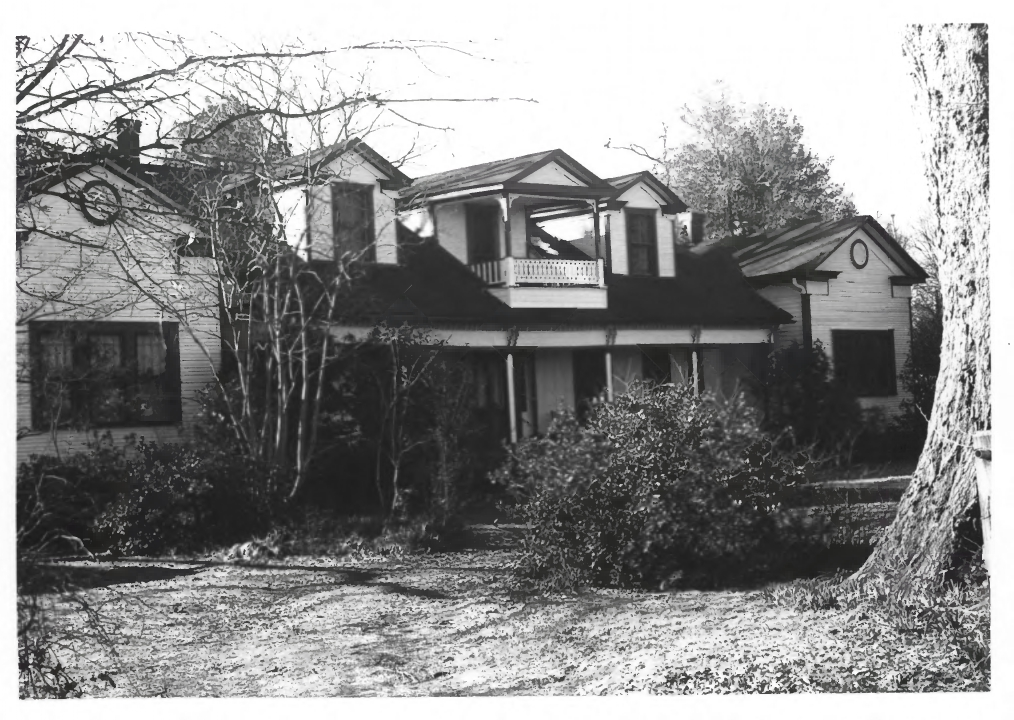

- Location within Louisiana Location within the United States
- Location: 317 North Oak Street (LA 133), Oak Ridge, Louisiana
- Coordinates: 32°37′37″N 91°46′22″W
- Area: 1 acre (0.40 ha)
- Built: 1869
- Built by: J.H. Limerick
- Architectural style: Italianate
- NRHP reference No.: 89001387
- Added to NRHP: September 7, 1989

Excelsior, at 317 North Oak Street (LA 133), Oak Ridge, Louisiana in Morehouse Parish in northern Louisiana, was built in 1869. The building was listed on the National Register of Historic Places on September 7, 1989. The listing included five contributing buildings.

It was built as a wood frame five bay Italianate cottage in the hamlet of Oak Ridge, in an open rural setting among delta cotton fields. It was expanded by gable-fronted flanking sections joined by extension of the front gallery floor, each with an Italianate facade. The enlarged building was advertised as the Excelsior Hotel in 1880.

== See also ==
- National Register of Historic Places listings in Morehouse Parish, Louisiana
