= Lynchings of Mer Rouge, Louisiana =

1922 Ku Klux Klan lynchings

- Part of Ku Klux Klan power struggle for control of Northern Louisiana
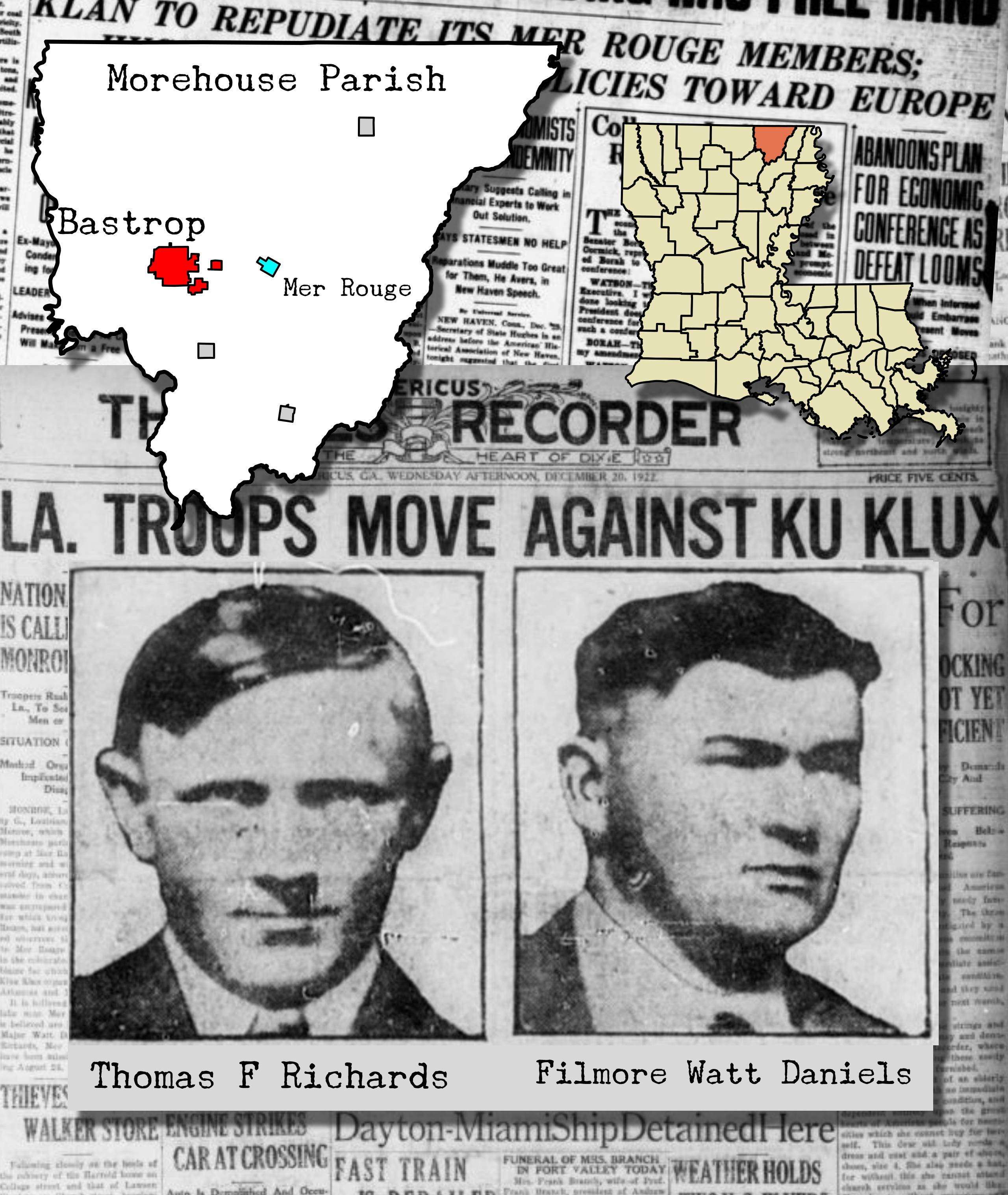
- News coverage of the Lynchings of Mer Rouge, Louisiana including the photos of Filmore Watt Daniel and Thomas F. Richard
- Date: Disappeared on August 24, 1922; Bodies discovered on December 24, 1922
- Location: Mer Rouge, Louisiana, US
- Participants: Ku Klux Klan (Klan No 34) from Bastrop, Louisiana
- Deaths: Filmore Watt Daniel; Thomas F. Richard
- Injuries: J.L. Daniel, whipped; W.C. Andrews, whipped

Filmore Watt Daniels [sic] and Thomas F. Richards [sic] were lynched near Mer Rouge, Louisiana, United States, by black robed Ku Klux Klan members on August 24, 1922. According to the United States Senate Committee on the Judiciary they were the 47th and 48th of 61 lynchings during 1922 in the United States. There were five lynchings in the state of Louisiana and of the 61 lynchings they were 2 of 6 white victims.

== Background ==
The Ku Klux Klan was extremely powerful in Louisiana since its revival in 1915. By 1924, there were thousands of Klan members in Louisiana, with each member paying $10 ($150 in 2022) to join. In 1922, Louisiana Governor John M. Parker pleaded with J. Edgar Hoover (then Assistant Director of the Bureau of Investigation) to help him as he wrote, "the Ku Klux Klan has grown so powerful in my state that it effectively controls the northern half. It has already kidnapped, tortured, and killed two people who opposed it…and it has threatened many more."

In Morehouse Parish, Louisiana there was a fierce rivalry between Mer Rouge and the larger community of Bastrop. In Bastrop, there existed a shadow Ku Klux Klan organization, Klan No 34, who held a powerful role as a morality vigilanty group. With the approval of Sheriff Fred Carpenter, they frequently attacked houses of prostitution, illegal liquor stills (Prohibition in the United States made alcohol illegal from 1920-1933) and other "vices". Klan No 34 was led by Cyclops J.K. Skipwith, a civil war veteran.

In Mer Rouge there were vocal critics of the Klan No 34's actions, some of which included:

- 70-year-old J.L. Daniel a wealthy Mer Rouge landowner
- Filmore Watt Daniel, J.L. Daniel's son, a graduate of Louisiana State University
- Thomas F. Richards a garage mechanic and good friend of F. Watt Daniel
- W.C. Andrews
- C.C. "Tot" Davenport

They objected to Klan No 34 imposing their morality on residents of Mer Rouge.

== Lynching ==
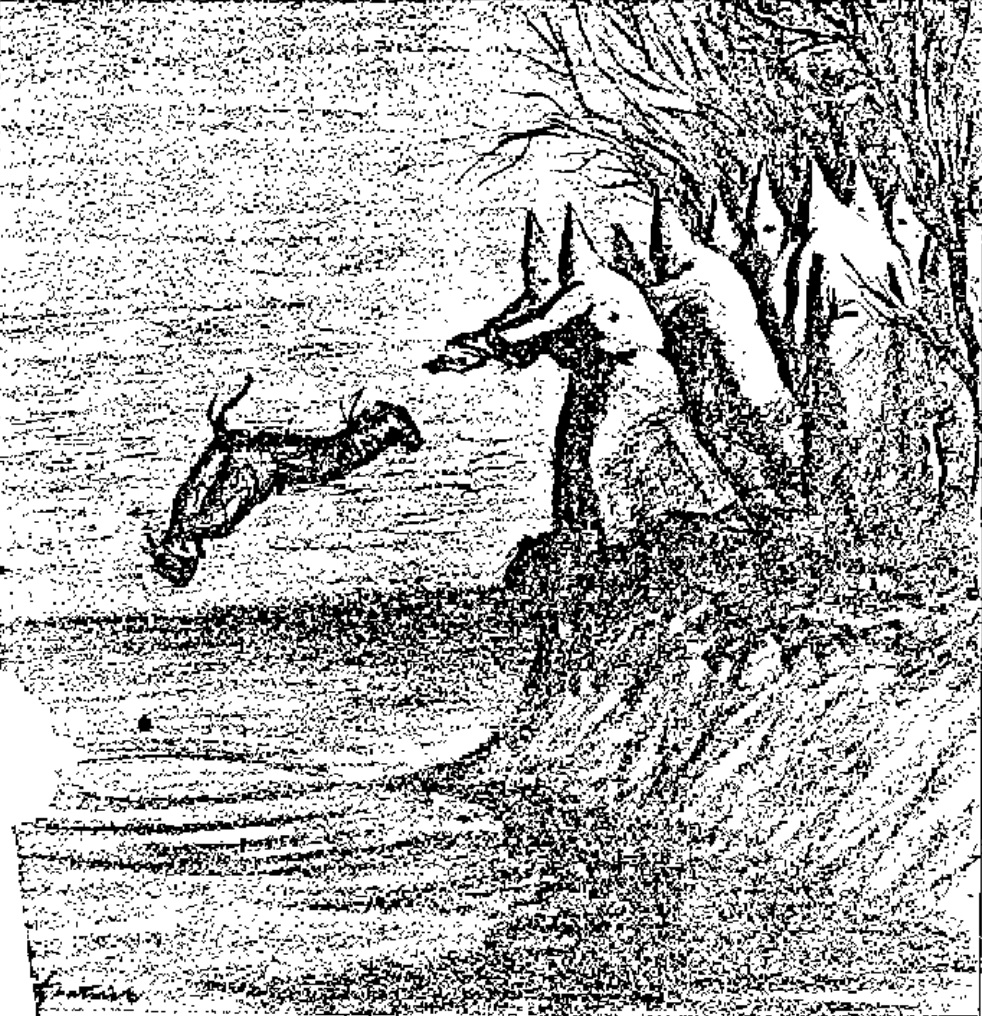
Cartoon from the December 28, 1922, St Louis Post-Dispatch titled "When Klanhood Was In Flower"

In Bastrop, on August 24, 1922, Morehouse Parish, Louisiana held a festival called the "good roads bond rally." Events included a picnic and baseball game. After the event, a group of around 50 cars returned from Bastrop to Mer Rouge around 5:00 PM. At the halfway mark between the towns, the convoy was stopped by heavily armed black-robed KKK men who searched every vehicle. At gunpoint, they forced five men from their cars Watt Daniel, Thomas F. Richard, J.L. Daniel, W.C. Andrews and C.C. "Tot" Davenport from their cars. That was the last time F. Watt Daniel and Thomas F. Richard were seen alive. After being released in Collinston, Louisiana, a town 7.5 miles (12.1 km) away, Andrews and J.L. Daniel later stumbled into town with whipping injuries on their back, C.C. "Tot" Davenport returned unharmed.

Witnesses testified in later investigations that near Lake Lafourche they saw a truck filled with black-hooded men guarding two blindfolded men in the bed of the truck. The same witnesses later saw the truck return minus the two blindfolded men about 45 minutes later.

== Aftermath ==
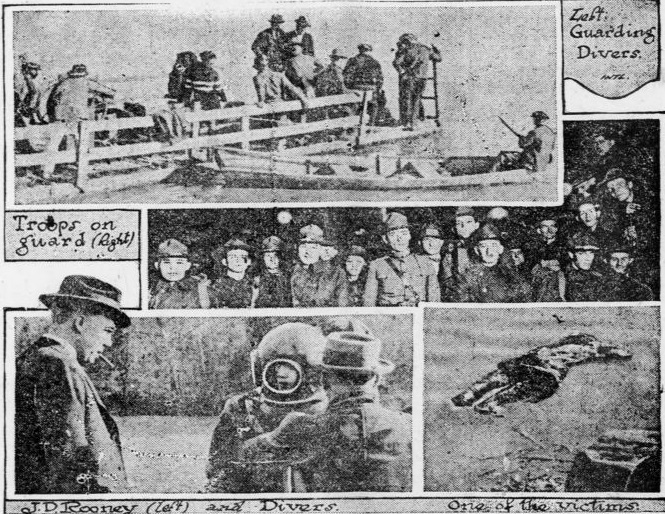
In the photo with the diver is Agent Rooney, and to the far left C.C. "Tot" Davenport, kidnaped at the same time, beaten and released.

Local Bastrop authorities, heavily infiltrated by the KKK, covered up the killings. Relatives of the missing had to appeal to State officials to get help in discovering the fate of the missing men, Filmore Watt Daniel and Thomas F. Richard.

Events came to a head when on December 19, 1922, Governor John M. Parker declared Morehouse Parish under martial law. Divers searching for the bodies of F. Watt Daniel and Thomas F. Richard had to be guarded by Louisiana National Guardsmen. On December 24, 1922, a "mysterious explosion" brought the badly decomposed bodies of two men to the surface of Lake Lafourche. New Orleans pathologists brought in specially by the Governor identified the bodies by noting that one wore a belt buckle with the initials "F.W.D." (F. Watt Daniel) and the other had clothing that Richard reportedly wore the night he went missing. Both bodies evidenced premortem torture that included bone fractures at regularized intervals; the body bearing clothing and personal items belonging to F. Watt Daniel had been subjected to surgical castration.

There was much speculation on the motive behind the lynchings but the silence of those involved limited why the men were killed. The leading theory was related to an alleged attack on the car of Dr. B. M. McKoin, a top official in the Klan No 34 enforcement squad. The survivors of the lynchings said they were questioned about this event but professed their innocence.

Both Richard and Daniel were vocally anti-Klan. Daniel was engaged in an amorous relationship with a mulatto woman, Lollie Bell Olive, from Galion, Louisiana. They had a son, Fillmore Watt Daniels, born two months after his death. Since McKoin's post-graduate specialization was genito-urinary medicine, he would have had the surgical expertise to mutilate the young man in the manner the pathologists described.

== Trial ==
After the discovery of the bodies as many as 50 witnesses testified during January 1923 that members of Klan No 34 including Sheriff Fred Carpenter and all deputies of the Morehouse Parish Sheriff's Office, District Attorney David Garrett, the local postmaster, T. Jeff Burnett, former Deputy Sheriff, and the leader of Klan no 34, J.K. Skipwith, were behind the kidnapping, torture and murder of Daniel and Richard. However, the infiltration of the local grand jury system by Klan members allowed them to dismiss the case for "insufficient evidence".

Louisiana Attorney General Adolphe V. Coco was able to eventually bring minor charges in April of 1923 on the Klan and 17 of its associates. This briefly caused them to flee the state until most of the charges were dropped. These attempts to seek justice ended in late 1923 when Governor Parker had retired and Attorney General Coco lost his reelection bid.

== See also ==
- Brown Culpepper was living in Holly Grove, Louisiana when he was lynched on March 13, 1922.
- Joe Pemberton was lynched in Benton, Louisiana on July 7, 1922
- Thomas Rivers was lynched in Bossier Parish, Louisiana on August 30, 1922

== Bibliography ==
Notes

References

- Alexander, Charles C. (2014). The Ku Klux Klan in the Southwest. University Press of Kentucky. ISBN 9780813161976. - Total pages: 304
- Brown, Yvonne (2006). "Tolerance and Bigotry in Southwest Louisiana: The Ku Klux Klan, 1921-23". Louisiana History: The Journal of the Louisiana Historical Association. 47 (2). Louisiana Historical Association: 153–168. ISSN 0024-6816. JSTOR 4234179. OCLC 614614860.
- Federal Bureau of Investigation (March 11, 2004). "A Byte Out of FBI History:Imperial Kleagle of the Ku Klux Klan in Kustody". Federal Bureau of Investigation. Archived from the original on September 19, 2009.
- Newton, Michael (2015). The FBI and the KKK: A Critical History. McFarland. ISBN 9781476605104. - Total pages: 248
- "Accused Klansmen flee Louisiana". New York Times. New York City: Adolph Ochs. April 15, 1923. ISSN 1553-8095. OCLC 1645522.
- United States Senate Committee on the Judiciary (1926). "To Prevent and Punish the Crime of Lynching: Hearings Before the United States Senate Committee on the Judiciary, Subcommittee on S. 121, Sixty-Ninth Congress, First Session, on Feb. 16, 1926". United States Government Publishing Office.

Number	Name	Date	Place	Method of lynching	Number of victims
1	Bill McAllister	January 8, 1922	Williamsburg, S.C.	Shot	1
2	Lincoln Hickson	January 8, 1922	Williamsburg, S.C.	Shot	1
3	Willie Jenkins	January 10, 1922	Eufaula, Alabama	Shot	1
4	Jake Brooks	January 14, 1922	Oklahoma City, Oklahoma	Hanged	1
5	Charles Strong	January 17, 1922	Mayo, Florida	Hanged	1
6	Will Bell	January 29, 1922	Pontotoc, Mississippi	Shot	1
7	Unidentified	January 29, 1922	Pontotoc, Mississippi	Shot	
8	Drew Conner (White)	January 28, 1922	Bolinger, Alabama	Burned	1
9	Will Thrasher	February 1, 1922	Crystal Springs, Mississippi	Hanged	1
10	Harry Harrison	February 2, 1922	Malvern, Arkansas	Shot	1
11	Manuel Duarte	February 2, 1922	Cameron County, Texas	Shot	1
12	P. Norman	February 11, 1922	Texarkana, Arkansas	Shot	1
13	Will Jones	February 13, 1922	Ellaville, Georgia	Shot	1
14	William Baker	March 8, 1922	Aberdeen, Mississippi	Hanged	1
15	Alfred Williams	March 12, 1922	Harlem, Georgia	Hanged	1
16	Brown Culpepper (White)	March 13, 1922	Holly Grove, Louisiana	Shot	1
17	Jerry Ingram	March 17, 1922	Crawford, Mississippi	Shot	1
18	Unidentified (white)	March 19, 1922	Okay, Oklahoma	Drowned	1
19	Alexander Smith	March 22, 1922	Gulfport, Mississippi	Hanged	1
20	Snap Curry	May 6, 1922	Kirvin, Texas	Burned	1
21	H. Varney (or Johnnie Cornish)	May 6, 1922	Kirvin, Texas	Burned	1
22	Mose Jones	May 6, 1922	Kirvin, Texas	Burned	1
23	Tom Cornish	May 8, 1922	Kirvin, Texas	Hanged	1
24	Thomas Early	May 17, 1922	Conroe, Texas	Burned	1
25	Charles Atkins	May 18, 1922	Davisboro, Georgia	Burned	1
26	Hullen Owens	May 19, 1922	Texarkana, Texas	Hanged (body burned)	1
27	Joe Winters	May 20, 1922	Conroe, Texas	Burned	1
28	Mose Bozier	May 20, 1922	Alleyton, Texas	Hanged	1
29	Gilbert Wilson	May 23, 1922	Bryan, Texas	Beaten to death	1
30	Jesse Thomas	May 26, 1922	Waco, Texas	Shot (body burned)	1
31	William Byrd	May 28, 1922	Brentwood, Georgia	Shot (body burned)	1
32	Robert Collins	June 20, 1922	Summit, Mississippi	Hanged	1
33	Warren Lewis	June 23, 1922	New Dacus, Texas	Hanged	1
34	James Harvey	July 1, 1922	Lanes Bridge, Georgia	Hanged	1
35	Joe Jordan	July 1, 1922	Lanes Bridge, Georgia	Hanged	1
36	Philip Tankard	July 5, 1922	Belhaven, North Carolina	Shot	1
37	Joe Pemberton	July 7, 1922	Benton, Louisiana	Hanged	1
38	Jake "Shake" Davis	July 14, 1922	Miller County, Georgia	Hanged	1
39	Oscar Mack	July 18, 1922	Orange County, Florida	Hanged (False report, Oscar Mack survived)	1
40	Will Anderson	July 24, 1922	Allentown, Georgia	Shot	1
41	John West	July 28, 1922	Guernsey, Arkansas	Shot	1
42	Gilbert Harris	August 1, 1922	Hot Springs, Arkansas	Hanged	1
43	John Glover	August 1, 1922	Holton,	Shot	1
44	Bayner Blackwell	August 6, 1922	Swansboro, North Carolina	Shot	1
45	John Steelman	August 23, 1922	Lambert, Mississippi	Burned	1
46	Thomas Rivers	August 30, 1922	Bossier Parish, Louisiana	Hanged	1
47	F. Watt Daniels (White)	August 1922	Mer Rouge, Louisiana	Ku-Klux Klan	1
48	Thomas F. Richards (White)	August 1922	Mer Rouge, Louisiana	Ku-Klux Klan	1
49	Jim Reed Long	September 2, 1922	Winder, Georgia	Ku-Klux Klan	1
50	O.J. Johnson	September 7, 1922	Newton, Texas	Hanged	1
51	Jim Johnston	September 28, 1922	Sandersville, Georgia	Hanged	1
52	Grover C. Everett	September 28, 1922	Abilene, Texas	Shot	1
53	John Brown	October 3, 1922	Montgomery, Alabama	Shot	1
54	Ed Hartley (white)	October 20, 1922	Camden, Tennessee	Shot	1
55	George Hartley (white)	October 20, 1922	Camden, Tennessee	Shot	1
56	Elias V. Zarate	November 11, 1922	Weslaco, Texas	Shot	1
57	Cupid Dickson / Cubrit Dixon	December 5, 1922	Madison, Florida	Shot	1
58	Charles Wright	December 8 ,1922	Perry, Florida	Burned	1
59	Less Smith	December 9, 1922	Morrilton, Arkansas	Burned	1
60	George Gay	December 11, 1922	Streetman, Texas	Hanged	1
61	Arthur Young	December 11, 1922	Perry, Florida	Hanged	1
