= Bastrop High School Building (Bastrop, Louisiana) =

- Bastrop High School
- U.S. National Register of Historic Places
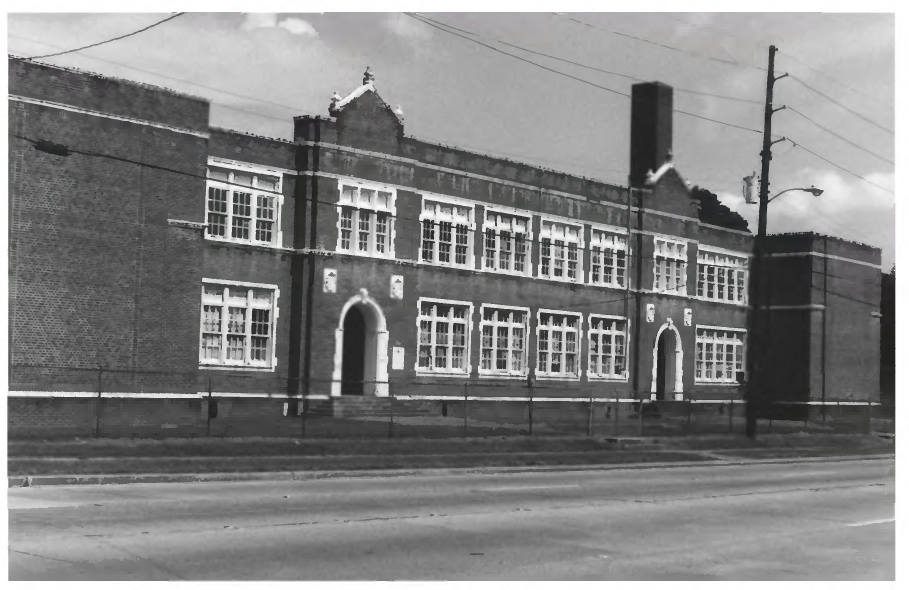

- Location within Louisiana Location within the United States
- Location: 715 South Washington Street, Bastrop, Louisiana
- Coordinates: 32°46′19″N 91°54′50″W
- Area: 4 acres (1.6 ha)
- Built: 1927
- Architect: J.W. Smith Associates
- Architectural style: Tudor Revival
- NRHP reference No.: 02001544
- Added to NRHP: December 20, 2002

Bastrop High School, at 715 S. Washington St. in Bastrop, Morehouse Parish, Louisiana in north Louisiana, was built in two stages in 1927 and 1930. It was listed on the National Register of Historic Places on December 20, 2002. It served as Bastrop's high school until partway through the 1955–56 school year, when students moved to a new school, and it became a junior high school until the late 1980s. It was used for other educational purposes for some more years, then was vacant, and was vacant in 2002.

It is a "sprawling" two-story brick building near the downtown of Bastrop. The building is two stories tall, raised on a basement story. Its original 1927 portion faced west, with a gymnasium in the center of an E shape. It was nearly doubled in size in 1930, with design by the same architect in the same style, adding a C-shaped extension which enclosed the gymnasium in a rectangle of classrooms, offices and other spaces, leaving narrow light courts next to the gymnasium. It has two entrance pavilions on both the east and west sides, and one each on the north and south sides.

According to its NRHP nomination the building is "sparingly though convincingly articulated in the Jacobean style with red brick walls and detailing set off in contrasting white cast concrete. Each entrance pavilion has a great round vestibule arch with impost blocks resting on panels and quoins. Crowning the composition is an angular rooftop gable parapet with upward thrusting finials. Flanking the arched entrances are Baroque-style cartouches. Although these are not, in and of themselves, Jacobean features, they mark the place where figure sculpture would be in a real English Jacobean great house."

== See also ==
- National Register of Historic Places listings in Morehouse Parish, Louisiana
