= Mer Rouge High School =

- U.S. National Register of Historic Places
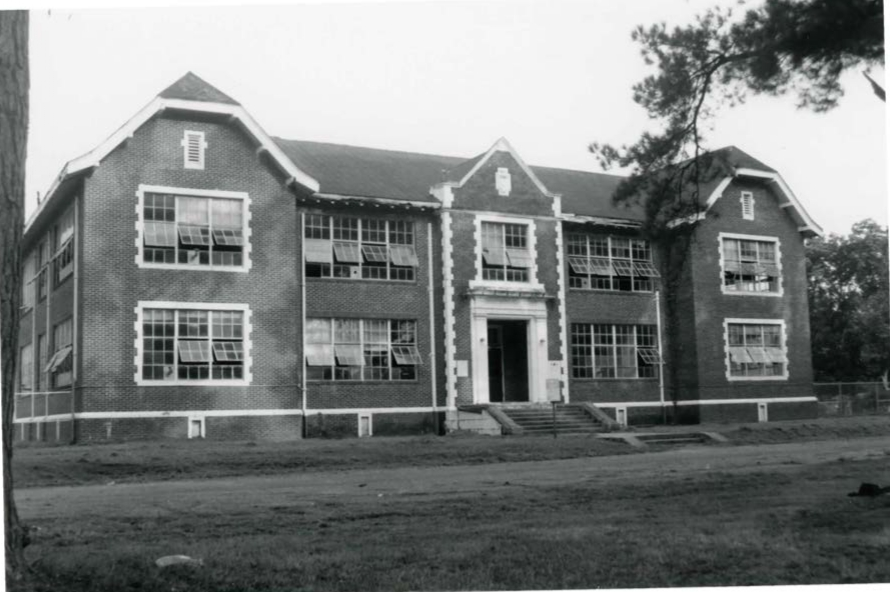

- Location within Louisiana Location within the United States
- Location: 500 South 14th Street, Mer Rouge, Louisiana
- Coordinates: 32°46′20″N 91°47′44″W
- Area: less than one acre
- Built: 1925
- Architect: J.W. Smith Architects
- Architectural style: Tudor Revival, Bungalow/Craftsman
- NRHP reference No.: 04000145
- Added to NRHP: March 4, 2004

The Mer Rouge High School, at 500 South 14th Street in Mer Rouge, Morehouse Parish in northern Louisiana, was built in 1925. It was listed on the National Register of Historic Places on March 4, 2004.

It is a two-story, brick veneer building. It was designed by J.W. Smith Architects of Monroe, Louisiana.

It was deemed significant "as a milestone in the history of public education in the community, and perhaps even more importantly, its auditorium was Mer Rouge's community center. As one longtime citizen explained, in rural areas, schools are much more than just schools; they were the "heart of the community," where all manner of large events took place."

Until 1970, white students in the area attended Mer Rouge High School, while all rural black pupils in Morehouse Parish were enrolled in Union High School, approximately two miles south of Mer Rouge. The Class of 1970 was the last to graduate from Mer Rouge High School, when white public high schools, located in each of the smaller towns in the parish (Mer Rouge, Collinston, Oak Ridge and Bonita), were combined with Union High School, forming Delta High School, thus ending racially segregated education in the parish. In 2019, the building had stood vacant since 1997.

== See also ==
- National Register of Historic Places listings in Morehouse Parish, Louisiana
