= David Ginn =

American politician

Charles David 'Bo' Ginn

Louisiana State Senator from District 33 (East Carroll, Morehouse, Richland, and West Carroll parishes; in second term, East Carroll, Madison, Morehouse, Richland, West Carroll and five precincts from Ouachita Parish)
- In office 1980–1988
- Preceded by: Edwards Barham
- Succeeded by: Willie E. Crain

Personal details
- Born: 1 August 1927 Virginia
- Died: 2006 (aged 78–79)
- Party: Democratic
- Spouse: Patricia Lois Ginn

Charles David Ginn, known as David 'Bo' Ginn Williams (1 August 1927 - 2006), is a Democrat former member of the Louisiana State Senate from Bastrop, Louisiana. He formerly resided in Tupelo, Mississippi. From 1980 to 1988, Ginn represented Senate District 33, which in the first term encompassed his own Morehouse Parish and Richland, West Carroll, and East Carroll parishes in the northeastern portion of his state.

In the 1979 primary election, Ginn upset Edwards Barham, a one-term Republican and the first member of his party since Reconstruction elected to the Louisiana Senate. Ginn won reelection in 1983, when he defeated fellow Democrat Willie E. Crain, 23,062 (52.5 percent) to 20,865 (47.5 percent). This time, the district included Madison Parish, five precincts from Ouachita Parish, as well as Morehouse, Richland, and East and West Carroll. Ginn did not seek a third term in the 1987 primary, as voters elected Willie Crain to the seat by a large margin.

Preceded by Edwards Barham	Louisiana State Senate from District 33 (East Carroll, Morehouse, Richland, and West Carroll parishes; in second term, East Carroll, Madison, Morehouse, Richland, West Carroll, and five precincts from Ouachita Parish); Charles David "Bo" Ginn; 1980–1988	Succeeded by Willie E. Crain
