= Bastrop High School (Louisiana) =

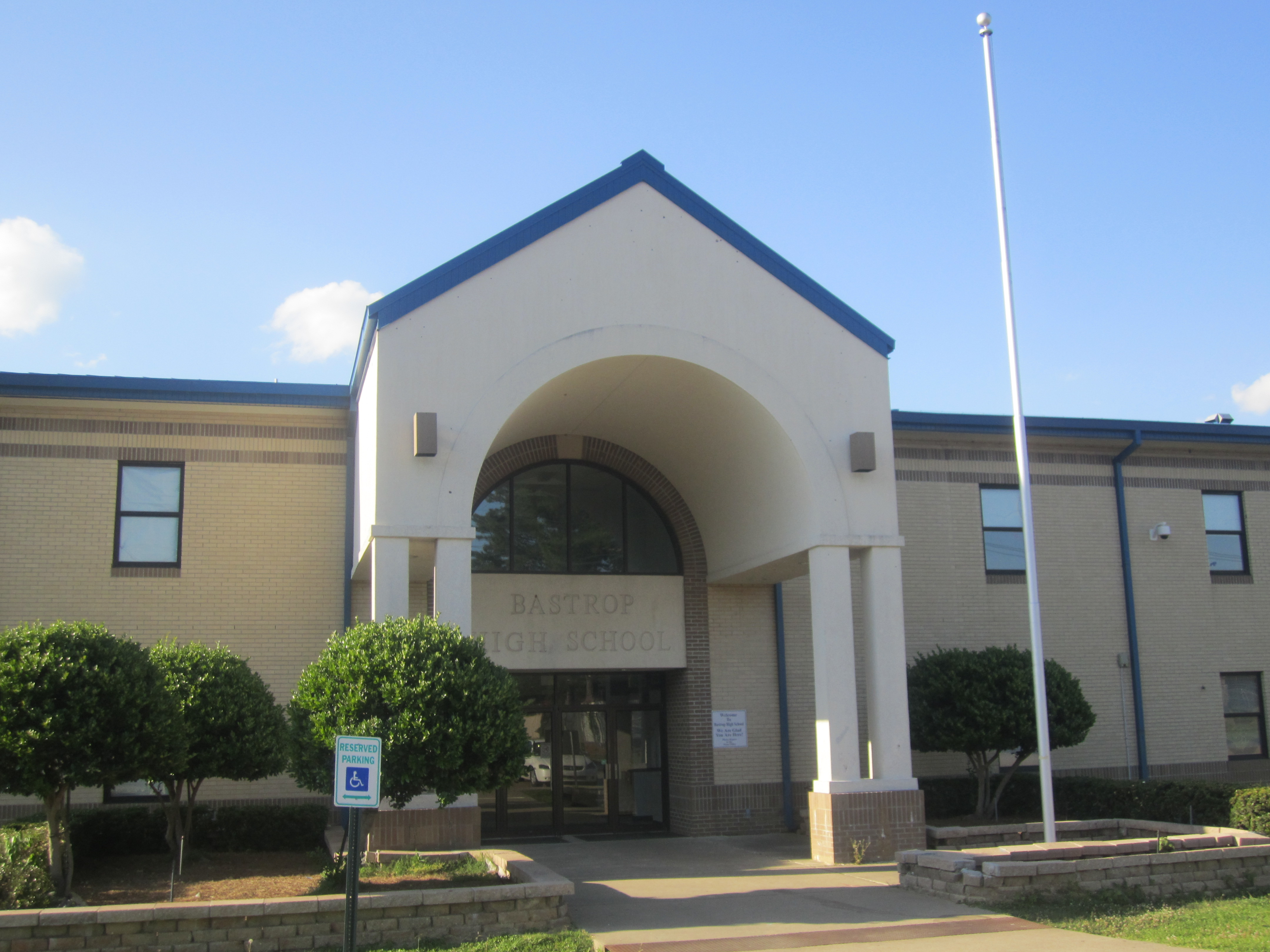

Location
- 402 Highland Avenue; Bastrop, (Morehouse Parish), Louisiana 71220; United States
- Coordinates: 32.7884°N 91.9202°W

Information
- Type: Public high school
- School district: Morehouse Parish School Board
- Principal: Roy Higgins
- Staff: 64.15 (FTE)
- Enrollment: 879 (2023-2024)
- Student to teacher ratio: 13.70
- Colors: Blue and white
- Mascot: Rams
- Yearbook: Ram

Bastrop High School is a senior high school in Bastrop, Louisiana, United States. It is a part of the Morehouse Parish School Board.

== History ==
In 2006, Bastrop High had an undefeated American football team season, but on August 28, 2006, the Louisiana High School Athletic Association removed the school's title, arguing that it had improperly contacted and transported players from Port Sulphur, Louisiana who had been displaced by Hurricane Katrina.

=== Prayer controversy ===
In 2011, graduating senior Damon Fowler objected to prayer at the Bastrop High School graduation exercises, claiming a looming violation of the First Amendment to the Constitution of the United States. The ACLU of Louisiana asked the school not to include a prayer in the May 20 graduation. At the Thursday night rehearsal for the graduation, senior Sarah Barlow included a prayer that explicitly mentioned Jesus, and during the graduation, student Laci Rae Mattice led people in the Lord's Prayer before a moment of silence. The school says that Mattice was told not to include a prayer. Fowler stated that after his objections became public he was ostracized by other students.

== Notable alumni ==
- Dan Johnson (Kentucky politician) – American religious leader and legislator (1960–2017)
