= Hulon B. Whittington =

United States Army Medal of Honor recipient (1921–1969)

Hulon Brocke Whittington
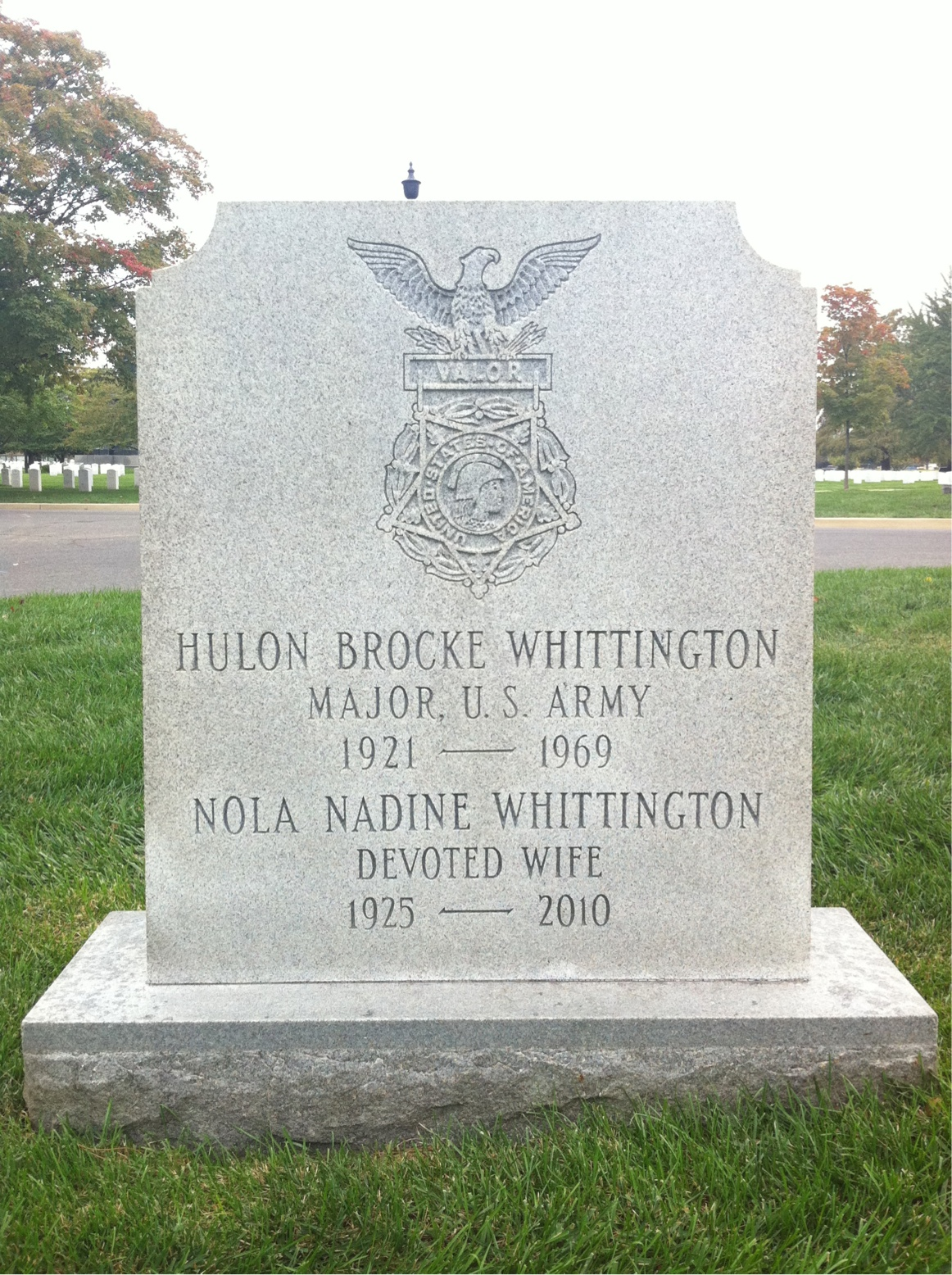
- Grave at Arlington National Cemetery
- Born: Hulon Brocke Whittington; July 9, 1921; Bogalusa, Louisiana, U.S.
- Died: January 17, 1969 (aged 47); Toledo, Ohio, U.S.
- Burial place: Arlington National Cemetery
- Military career
- Allegiance: United States
- Service years: 1940–1963
- Rank: Major
- Units: 41st Armored Infantry Regiment, 2nd Armored Division
- Conflicts: World War II; Vietnam War
- Awards: Medal of Honor; Silver Star; Bronze Star; Purple Heart (w/ one oak leaf cluster)

Hulon Brocke Whittington (July 9, 1921 – January 17, 1969) was a United States Army officer and a recipient of the United States military's highest decoration—the Medal of Honor—for his actions in World War II.

== Biography ==
Whittington joined the Army from Bastrop, Louisiana in August 1940, and by July 29, 1944, was serving as a Sergeant in the 41st Armored Infantry Regiment, 2nd Armored Division. On that day, near Grimesnil, France, he assumed command of his platoon and led it in a successful defense against a German armored attack. For his actions during the battle, he was awarded the Medal of Honor nine months later, on April 23, 1945.

Whittington became a commissioned officer in 1949 and reached the rank of major in 1960. While serving in Vietnam as an ARVN ordnance advisor, he suffered a heart attack, forcing him to retire. He died at age 47 and was buried at Arlington National Cemetery, Arlington County, Virginia.

== Medal of Honor citation ==
Whittington's official Medal of Honor citation reads:

For conspicuous gallantry and intrepidity at the risk of life above and beyond the call of duty. On the night of 29 July 1944, near Grimesnil, France, during an enemy armored attack, Sgt. Whittington, a squad leader, assumed command of his platoon when the platoon leader and platoon sergeant became missing in action. He reorganized the defense and, under fire, courageously crawled between gun positions to check the actions of his men. When the advancing enemy attempted to penetrate a roadblock, Sgt. Whittington, completely disregarding intense enemy action, mounted a tank and by shouting through the turret, directed it into position to fire pointblank at the leading Mark V German tank. The destruction of this vehicle blocked all movement of the remaining enemy column consisting of over 100 vehicles of a Panzer unit. The blocked vehicles were then destroyed by hand grenades, bazooka, tank, and artillery fire and large numbers of enemy personnel were wiped out by a bold and resolute bayonet charge inspired by Sgt. Whittington. When the medical aid man had become a casualty, Sgt. Whittington personally administered first aid to his wounded men. The dynamic leadership, the inspiring example, and the dauntless courage of Sgt. Whittington, above and beyond the call of duty, are in keeping with the highest traditions of the military service.

== See also ==
- List of Medal of Honor recipients
- List of Medal of Honor recipients for World War II
