= Morehouse Parish School Board =

School district in Louisiana, United States

Location
- Morehouse Parish, Louisiana
- Coordinates: 32.7572°N 91.9561°W

Other information
- Website: www.mpsb.us

Morehouse Parish School Board is a school district headquartered in an unincorporated area of Morehouse Parish, Louisiana, United States, near the city of Bastrop, the parish seat.

The district serves Morehouse Parish.

== Bastrop High School prayer controversy ==
In 2011, graduating senior Damon Fowler objected to prayer at the Bastrop High School graduation exercises, claiming a looming violation of the First Amendment to the Constitution of the United States. The ACLU of Louisiana asked the school not to include a prayer in the May 20 graduation. At the Thursday night rehearsal for the graduation, senior Sarah Barlow included a prayer that explicitly mentioned Jesus, and during the graduation, student Laci Rae Mattice led people in the Lord's Prayer before a moment of silence. The school says that Mattice was told not to include a prayer. Fowler stated that after his objections became public he was ostracized by other students. In 2012, Fowler received the Humanist Pioneer Award from the American Humanist Association.

== Schools ==
=== 6-12 schools ===
- Delta High School (Unincorporated area)

=== High schools ===
- Bastrop High School (Bastrop)

=== K-8 schools ===
- Beekman Junior High School (Unincorporated area)

=== 1-8 schools ===
- Morehouse Magnet School (Bastrop)

=== 7-8 schools ===
- Morehouse Junior High School (Bastrop)

=== PK-6 schools ===
- Henry V. Adams Elementary School (Bastrop)
- Cherry Ridge Elementary School (Unincorporated area)
- East Side Elementary School (Bastrop)
- Pine Grove Elementary School (Unincorporated area)
- Southside Elementary School (Bastrop)

=== 3-6 schools ===
- Carver Elementary School (Bastrop)

=== PK-2 schools ===
- Oak Hill Elementary School (Bastrop)

=== Alternative ===
- Bastrop Learning Academy (Bastrop)
