= Edwards Barham =

American politician (1937–2014)

Erle Edwards Barham

Louisiana State Senator for District 33 (East Carroll, Morehouse, Richland, and West Carroll parishes)
- In office 1976–1980
- Preceded by: Charles M. Brown
- Succeeded by: David Ginn

Personal details
- Born: July 10, 1937 Louisiana
- Died: October 17, 2014 (aged 77) Louisiana
- Cause of death: plane crash
- Resting place: Episcopal Church of the Redeemer Cemetery in Oak Ridge, Louisiana
- Party: Republican
- Spouse: Bennie Faye Berry Barham
- Relations: Robert J. Barham (brother)
- Children: Ben Edwards Barham, II (deceased) Erle West Barham; Amy Barham Westbrook Robert Berry Barham
- Education: Oak Ridge High School Louisiana State University University of Louisiana at Monroe
- Occupation: Farmer and businessman

Erle Edwards Barham (July 10, 1937 – October 17, 2014) was a Republican member of the Louisiana State Senate. He first won the Senate seat in December 1975 beating L. B. Loftin by just 89 votes.

Barham was a certified flight instructor, and was killed when he struck a perimeter fence while taxiing an airplane on the runway.

Preceded by Charles M. Brown	Louisiana State Senator for District 33 (East Carroll, Morehouse, Richland, and West Carroll parishes); Erle Edwards Barham; 1976–1980	Succeeded by David Ginn
