= Mer Rouge, Louisiana =

- Village
- Location in Morehouse Parish, Louisiana

- Location of Louisiana in the United States
- Coordinates: 32°46′36″N 91°47′41″W
- Country: United States
- State: Louisiana
- Parish: Morehouse

Area
  - Total: 1.18 sq mi (3.06 km^{2})
  - Land: 1.17 sq mi (3.04 km^{2})
  - Water: 0.0077 sq mi (0.02 km^{2})
- Elevation: 92 ft (28 m)

Population (2020)
  - Total: 491
  - Density: 418.8/sq mi (161.69/km^{2})
- Time zone: UTC-6 (CST)
  - Summer (DST): UTC-5 (CDT)
- Area code: 318
- FIPS code: 22-49905
- GNIS feature ID: 2407500

Mer Rouge (lit. 'Red Sea') is a village in Morehouse Parish, Louisiana, United States. The population was 491 at the 2020 census, down from 628 in 2010.

== History ==
There is a hill that serves as a boundary between Mer Rouge and Bastrop, named "Red Hill". According to legend, French settlers recognized the "sea of red sedge" between the bluffs to the north and west of the area. They called it "Prairie Mer Rouge", or the "red sea" prairie.

On February 3, 1865, near the end of the American Civil War, two squadrons of the Illinois cavalry attacked Mer Rouge and, according to historian John D. Winters, seized some horses and mules, while also freeing some enslaved African-Americans. They then "burned about 300,000 bushels of corn [and] some cotton", thus undermining the production power of the pro-slavery rebels.

In August 1922, in a case that would attract national attention, members of the Ku Klux Klan abducted two Mer Rouge men—Filmore Watt Daniel and Thomas Fletcher Richard—on the Bastrop highway. After torturing and killing the men, the Klansmen disposed of their bodies in nearby Lake Lafourche. Following the killings, Louisiana Governor John M. Parker sought help from the U.S. Department of Justice in suppressing Klan violence within the state.

On October 5, 2014, a Union Pacific freight train crashed into a lowboy trailer loaded with a crane, seriously injuring both railroad crew and causing two engines along with 17 cars to derail. 50 homes were evacuated due to the leakage of argon gas from the tank car.

== Geography ==
Mer Rouge is in central Morehouse Parish, 7 miles (11 km) east of Bastrop, the parish seat. The above-mentioned Red Hill rises 50 feet (15 m) above the plain on which Mer Rouge sits, about halfway between the village and Bastrop.

U.S. Routes 165 and 425 pass through the village. The highways lead together westerly to Bastrop but split in the center of Mer Rouge, the US 165 leading northeast 12 miles (19 km) to Bonita and US 425 leading south 11 miles (18 km) to Oak Ridge.

According to the U.S. Census Bureau, Mer Rouge has an area of 1.18 square miles (3.06 km^{2}), of which 0.008 square miles (0.021 km^{2}), or 0.68%, are water.

== Demographics ==
Historical population
Census	Pop.	Note	%±
1900	465		—
1910	536		15.3%
1920	656		22.4%
1930	669		2.0%
1940	713		6.6%
1950	784		10.0%
1960	853		8.8%
1970	819		−4.0%
1980	802		−2.1%
1990	586		−26.9%
2000	721		23.0%
2010	628		−12.9%
2020	491		−21.8%
2025 (est.)	450	▼	−8.4%
U.S. Decennial Census

As of the census of 2000, there were 956 people, 504 households, and 172 families residing in the village. The population density was 576.8 inhabitants per square mile (222.7/km^{2}). There were 293 housing units at an average density of 234.4 per square mile (90.5/km^{2}). The racial makeup of the village was 62.97% White, 36.48% African American, 0.28% Native American, and 0.28% from two or more races. Hispanic or Latino of any race were 1.11% of the population.

There were 264 households, out of which 27.7% had children under the age of 18 living with them, 41.7% were married couples living together, 20.1% had a female householder with no husband present, and 34.5% were non-families. 30.7% of all households were made up of individuals, and 15.2% had someone living alone who was 65 years of age or older. The average household size was 2.28 and the average family size was 2.86.

In the village, the population was spread out, with 20.0% under the age of 18, 7.4% from 18 to 24, 23.3% from 25 to 44, 20.9% from 45 to 64, and 28.4% who were 65 years of age or older. The median age was 45 years. For every 100 females, there were 81.2 males. For every 100 females age 18 and over, there were 78.1 males.

The median income for a household in the village was $23,472, and the median income for a family was $27,273. Males had a median income of $26,833 versus $19,861 for females. The per capita income for the village was $12,759. About 29.7% of families and 39.6% of the population were below the poverty line, including 51.7% of those under age 18 and 10.9% of those age 65 or over.

== Notable people ==
- Lou Brock, former Major League Baseball player and member of the Baseball Hall of Fame
- Ben Lilly, big game hunter; once owned a farm located near Mer Rouge
- Newt V. Mills, congressman from Louisiana's 5th District; taught school in Mer Rouge from 1921 to 1932
- Samuel W. Mitcham Jr., writer of military history; born in Mer Rouge

== See also ==
- Mer Rouge High School
