= Morehouse Parish, Louisiana =

Parish in Louisiana, United States

Morehouse Parish
- Parish
- Parish of Morehouse; Paroisse de Morehouse (French)
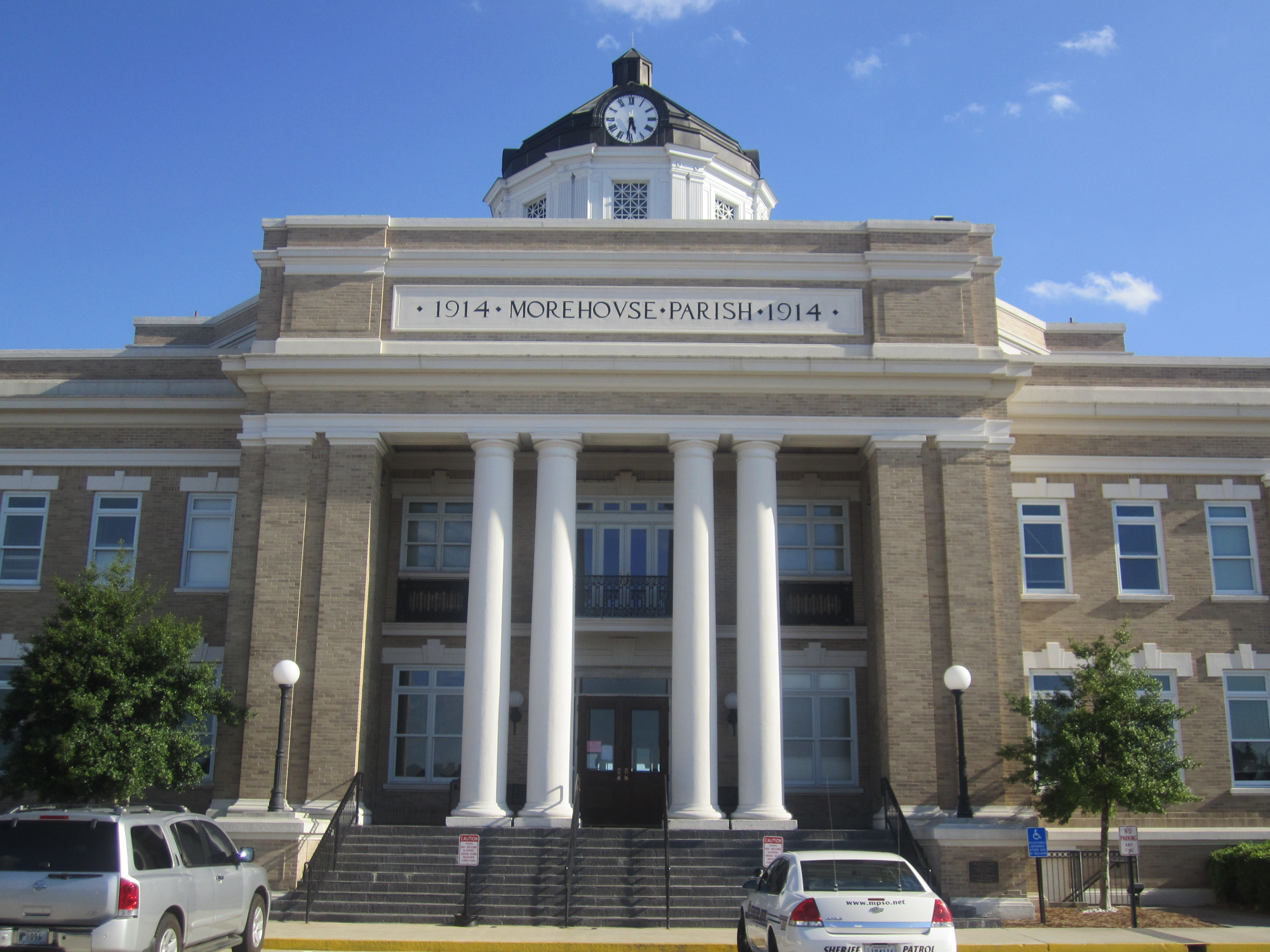
- The Morehouse Parish Courthouse (built 1914) is located in the center of downtown Bastrop.

- Location within the U.S. state of Louisiana
- Coordinates: 32°49′N 91°48′W
- Country: United States
- State: Louisiana
- Founded: 1844
- Named for: Abraham Morehouse
- Seat: Bastrop
- Largest city: Bastrop

Area
  - Total: 805 sq mi (2,080 km^{2})
  - Land: 794 sq mi (2,060 km^{2})
  - Water: 11 sq mi (28 km^{2}) 1.4%

Population (2020)
  - Total: 25,629
  - Estimate (2025): 23,705 ▼
  - Density: 32.3/sq mi (12.5/km^{2})
- Time zone: UTC−6 (Central)
  - Summer (DST): UTC−5 (CDT)
- Congressional district: 5th

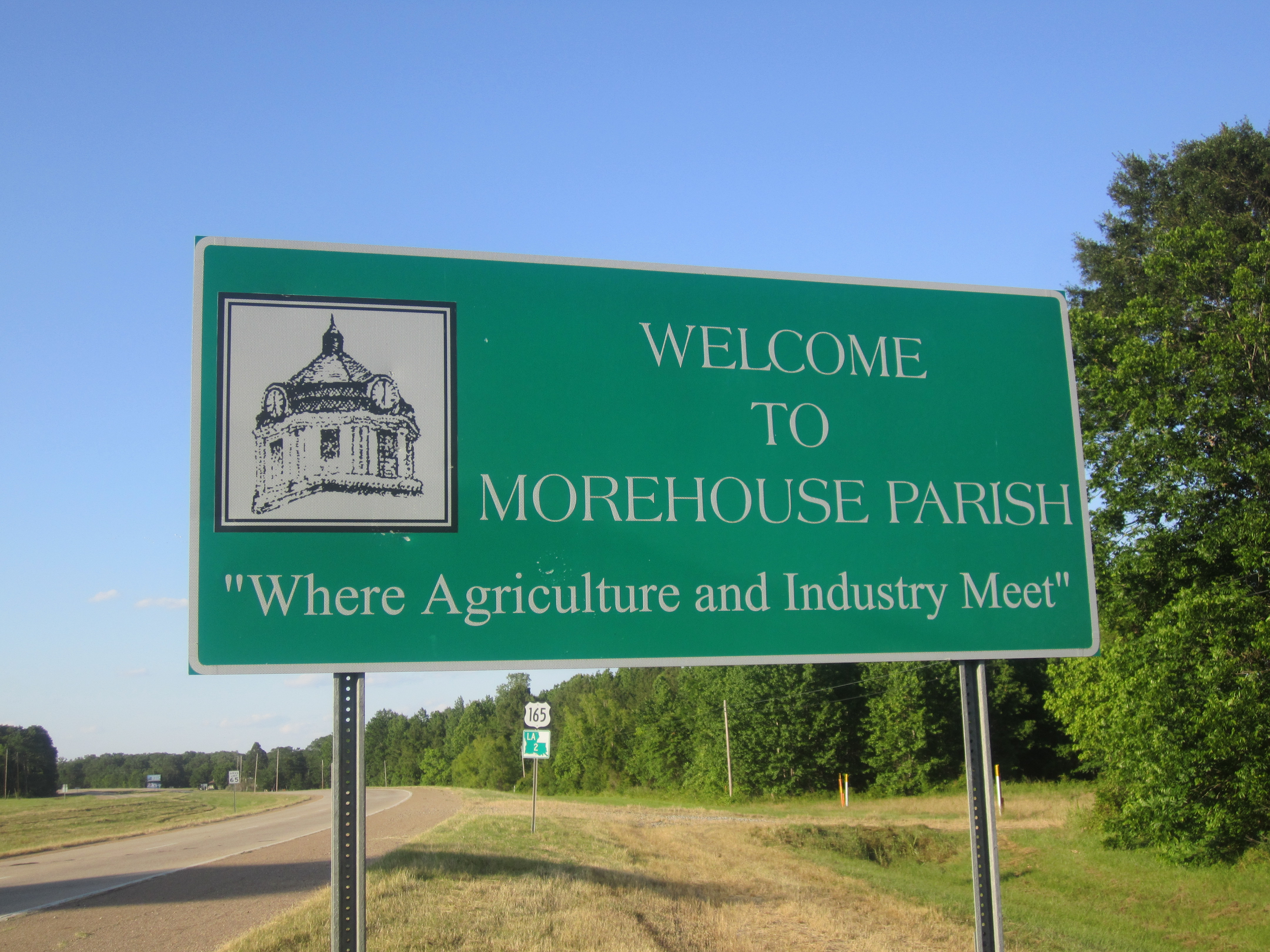

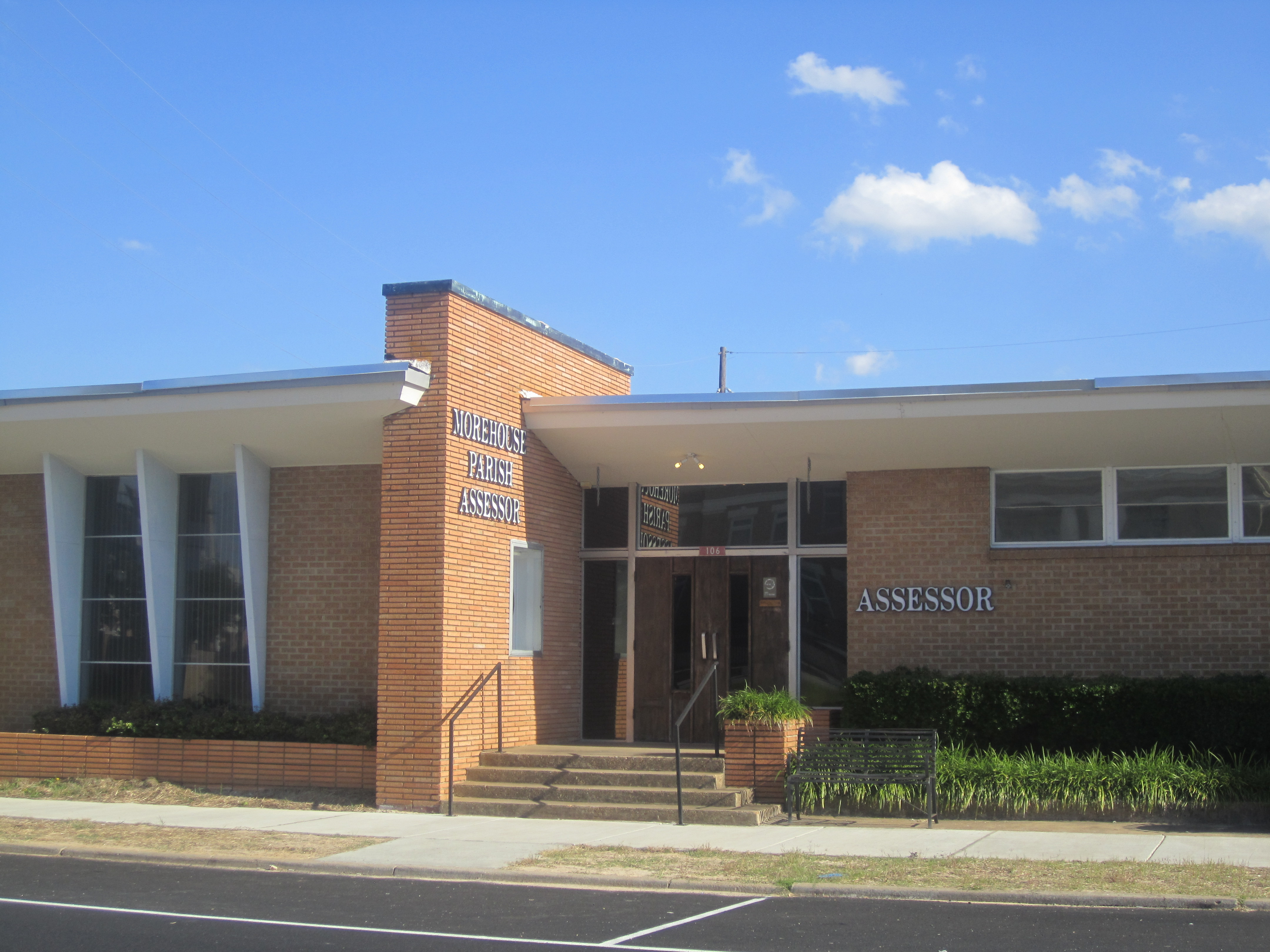
The Morehouse Parish Assessor's Office is located behind the parish courthouse in Bastrop.

Morehouse Parish (French: Paroisse de Morehouse) is a parish located in the U.S. state of Louisiana. As of the 2020 census, the population was 25,629. The parish seat is Bastrop. The parish was formed in 1844.

Morehouse Parish comprises the Bastrop, LA Micropolitan Statistical Area, which is included in the Monroe–Ruston–Bastrop, LA Combined Statistical Area.

== History ==
Francois Bonaventure built a house on 2000~acre tract in 1775 in Bastrop, Louisiana.

Morehouse Parish is named after Colonel Abraham Morehouse, who served in the Revolutionary War.

Throughout the first half of the twentieth century, Morehouse Parish was a stronghold of the Ku Klux Klan. During the trial for the 1922 Lynchings of Mer Rouge, Louisiana, many witnesses testified that parish officials including Sheriff Fred Carpenter, his deputies, the district attorney, and the postmaster were Klan members. However, the grand jury, itself likely made up largely of Klan members, dismissed the case.

== Geography ==
According to the U.S. Census Bureau, the parish has a total area of 806 square miles (2,090 km^{2}), of which 795 square miles (2,060 km^{2}) is land and 11 square miles (28 km^{2}) (1.4%) is water.

=== Major highways ===
- U.S. Highway 165
- U.S. Highway 425
- Louisiana Highway 2
- Louisiana Highway 133
- Louisiana Highway 134
- Louisiana Highway 138
- Louisiana Highway 139
- Louisiana Highway 140
- Louisiana Highway 142
- Louisiana Highway 554
- Louisiana Highway 590
- Louisiana Highway 591
- Louisiana Highway 592
- Louisiana Highway 593
- Louisiana Highway 599
- Louisiana Highway 830-1
- Louisiana Highway 830-2
- Louisiana Highway 830-3
- Louisiana Highway 830-4
- Louisiana Highway 830-6
- Louisiana Highway 833
- Louisiana Highway 834
- Louisiana Highway 835
- Louisiana Highway 1257
- Louisiana Highway 1268

=== Adjacent counties and parishes ===
- Union County, Arkansas (northwest)
- Ashley County, Arkansas (north)
- Chicot County, Arkansas (northeast)
- West Carroll Parish (east)
- Richland Parish (southeast)
- Ouachita Parish (southwest)
- Union Parish (west)

=== National protected areas ===
- Handy Brake National Wildlife Refuge
- Upper Ouachita National Wildlife Refuge (part)

== Communities ==
=== City ===
- Bastrop (parish seat and largest municipality)

=== Villages ===
- Bonita
- Collinston
- Mer Rouge
- Oak Ridge

=== Unincorporated communities ===
- Beekman
- Bordenax
- Counters Neck
- Galion
- Geddie
- Gum Ridge
- Haynes Landing
- Humphreys
- Jones
- Laark
- Log Cabin
- Marcarco
- McGinty
- Naff
- New Land Grove Landing
- Oak Landing
- Perryville
- Point Pleasant
- Robinson
- Spyker
- Stampley
- Stevenson
- Upland
- Usarco
- Vaughn
- Wardville
- Windsor

== Demographics ==
Historical population
Census	Pop.	Note	%±
1850	3,913		—
1860	10,357		164.7%
1870	9,387		−9.4%
1880	14,206		51.3%
1890	16,786		18.2%
1900	16,634		−0.9%
1910	18,786		12.9%
1920	19,311		2.8%
1930	23,689		22.7%
1940	27,571		16.4%
1950	32,038		16.2%
1960	33,709		5.2%
1970	32,463		−3.7%
1980	34,803		7.2%
1990	31,938		−8.2%
2000	31,021		−2.9%
2010	27,979		−9.8%
2020	25,629		−8.4%
2025 (est.)	23,705	▼	−7.5%
U.S. Decennial Census; 1790–1960 1900–1990; 1990–2000 2010

=== 2020 census ===
As of the 2020 census, the parish had a population of 25,629, 10,302 households, and 6,194 families. The median age was 42.8 years, 21.7% of residents were under the age of 18, 20.5% of residents were 65 years of age or older, for every 100 females there were 98.7 males, and for every 100 females age 18 and over there were 96.9 males age 18 and over.

49.2% of residents lived in urban areas, while 50.8% lived in rural areas.

There were 10,302 households in the parish, of which 28.7% had children under the age of 18 living in them. Of all households, 37.3% were married-couple households, 20.7% were households with a male householder and no spouse or partner present, and 36.6% were households with a female householder and no spouse or partner present. About 31.6% of all households were made up of individuals and 14.1% had someone living alone who was 65 years of age or older.

There were 11,863 housing units, of which 13.2% were vacant. Among occupied housing units, 66.7% were owner-occupied and 33.3% were renter-occupied. The homeowner vacancy rate was 1.9% and the rental vacancy rate was 8.4%.

=== Racial and ethnic composition ===
Morehouse Parish, Louisiana – Racial and ethnic composition Note: the US Census treats Hispanic/Latino as an ethnic category. This table excludes Latinos from the racial categories and assigns them to a separate category. Hispanics/Latinos may be of any race.
Race / Ethnicity (NH = Non-Hispanic)	Pop 1980	Pop 1990	Pop 2000	Pop 2010	Pop 2020	% 1980	% 1990	% 2000	% 2010	% 2020
White alone (NH)	20,611	18,528	17,215	14,251	12,220	59.22%	58.01%	55.49%	50.93%	47.68%
Black or African American alone (NH)	13,794	13,209	13,353	13,078	11,976	39.63%	41.36%	43.05%	46.74%	46.73%
Native American or Alaska Native alone (NH)	17	24	39	36	80	0.05%	0.08%	0.13%	0.13%	0.31%
Asian alone (NH)	36	41	57	98	89	0.10%	0.13%	0.18%	0.35%	0.35%
Native Hawaiian or Pacific Islander alone (NH)	x	x	2	12	3	x	x	0.01%	0.04%	0.01%
Other race alone (NH)	12	0	4	9	29	0.03%	0.00%	0.01%	0.03%	0.11%
Mixed race or Multiracial (NH)	x	x	121	240	851	x	x	0.39%	0.86%	3.32%
Hispanic or Latino (any race)	333	136	230	255	381	0.96%	0.43%	0.74%	0.91%	1.49%
Total	34,803	31,938	31,021	27,979	25,629	100.00%	100.00%	100.00%	100.00%	100.00%

=== 2010 census ===
By the 2010 census, 27,979 people lived in the parish. 51.3% were White, 46.9% Black or African American, 0.4% Asian, 0.1% Native American, 0.1% Pacific Islander, 0.3% of some other race and 1.0% of two or more races. 0.9% were Hispanic or Latino (of any race).

=== 2000 census ===
As of the 2000 census, there were 31,021 people, 11,382 households, and 8,320 families living in the parish. The population density was 39 people per square mile (15 people/km^{2}). There were 12,711 housing units at an average density of 16 per square mile (6.2/km^{2}). The racial makeup of the parish was 55.76% White, 43.36% Black or African American, 0.13% Native American, 0.18% Asian, 0.01% Pacific Islander, 0.12% from other races, and 0.44% from two or more races. 0.74% of the population were Hispanic or Latino of any race.

In 2000, there were 11,382 households, out of which 33.30% had children under the age of 18 living with them, 49.10% were married couples living together, 19.80% had a female householder with no husband present, and 26.90% were non-families. 24.40% of all households comprised individuals, and 11.60% had someone living alone who was 65 years of age or older. The average household size was 2.64 and the average family size was 3.14.

In the parish the population was spread out, with 27.50% under 18, 9.50% from 18 to 24, 26.40% from 25 to 44, 21.40% from 45 to 64, and 15.10% who were 65 years of age or older. The median age was 36 years. For every 100 females there were 91.40 males. For every 100 females age 18 and over, there were 86.10 males.

The median income for a household in the parish was $25,124 in 2000, and the median income for a family was $31,358. Males had a median income of $31,385 versus $18,474 for females. The per capita income for the parish was $13,197. About 21.30% of families and 26.80% of the population were below the poverty line, including 35.90% of those under age 18 and 23.80% of those age 65 or over.

== Law enforcement ==
Morehouse Parish Sheriff's Office
- Abbreviation: MPSO

Jurisdictional structure
- General nature: Local civilian police

Operational structure
- Headquarters: Bastrop, Louisiana
- Agency executive: Mike Tubbs, Sheriff

Website
- http://www.mpso.net/

The Morehouse Parish Sheriff's Office (MPSO) is the primary law enforcement agency of Morehouse Parish. It falls under the authority of the Sheriff, who is the chief law enforcement officer of the parish. As of 2022 the sheriff of Morehouse Parish is Mike Tubbs.

The Sheriff's Office operates the following facilities:

- Headquarters - The headquarters building is located at 351 South Franklin Street in Bastrop.
- Morehouse Parish Jail - The Morehouse Parish Jail is located at 250 East Walnut Street in Bastrop. The jail presently houses approximately 70 inmates and employs 20 full-time and part-time Corrections Officers.
- Morehouse Parish Detention Center - The Morehouse Parish Detention Center is located at 6444 Patey Road in Collinston. The Detention Center presently houses approximately 272 inmates and employs 33 corrections officers.

Since the formation of the Morehouse Parish Sheriff's Office, one deputy has been killed in the line of duty.

== Politics ==
In 1975, Edwards Barham, a farmer and businessman from Oak Ridge in Morehouse Parish, became the first Republican elected to the Louisiana State Senate since the era of Reconstruction. Barham won his seat by eighty-nine votes. He was unseated after a single term in office in 1979 by the Democrat David Ginn of Bastrop.

In the 2012 U.S. presidential election, Morehouse Parish cast 6,591 votes (52.3 percent) for Republican nominee Mitt Romney. U.S. President Barack Obama trailed with 5,888 ballots (46.7 percent). In 2008, Republican John McCain prevailed in Morehouse Parish with 7,258 votes (55 percent) to Barack Obama's 5,792 ballots (43.9 percent).

United States presidential election results for Morehouse Parish, Louisiana
Year	Republican		Democratic		Third party(ies)	
Year	No.	%	No.	%	No.	%
1912	8	1.74%	411	89.15%	42	9.11%
1916	3	0.53%	564	99.30%	1	0.18%
1920	38	5.76%	622	94.24%	0	0.00%
1924	141	19.50%	582	80.50%	0	0.00%
1928	340	28.81%	840	71.19%	0	0.00%
1932	83	3.96%	2,014	96.04%	0	0.00%
1936	172	6.40%	2,514	93.53%	2	0.07%
1940	222	8.41%	2,417	91.59%	0	0.00%
1944	478	20.45%	1,859	79.55%	0	0.00%
1948	242	8.60%	1,177	41.83%	1,395	49.57%
1952	2,567	46.06%	3,006	53.94%	0	0.00%
1956	1,850	35.70%	1,512	29.18%	1,820	35.12%
1960	2,551	53.37%	1,085	22.70%	1,144	23.93%
1964	6,222	87.47%	891	12.53%	0	0.00%
1968	1,772	19.82%	1,793	20.05%	5,377	60.13%
1972	5,770	66.94%	2,355	27.32%	495	5.74%
1976	5,418	55.90%	4,017	41.45%	257	2.65%
1980	7,254	58.51%	4,856	39.17%	287	2.32%
1984	8,585	62.73%	4,829	35.29%	271	1.98%
1988	7,335	60.42%	4,496	37.03%	309	2.55%
1992	5,364	39.84%	6,013	44.66%	2,086	15.49%
1996	5,193	41.57%	6,160	49.31%	1,140	9.13%
2000	6,641	53.90%	5,289	42.93%	391	3.17%
2004	7,471	57.60%	5,336	41.14%	164	1.26%
2008	7,258	54.98%	5,792	43.88%	150	1.14%
2012	6,591	52.25%	5,888	46.68%	135	1.07%
2016	6,502	54.86%	5,155	43.49%	195	1.65%
2020	6,510	56.25%	4,946	42.73%	118	1.02%
2024	5,961	59.04%	4,008	39.69%	128	1.27%

== Education ==
Morehouse Parish School Board operates local public schools.

== National Guard ==
The 1023rd Engineer Company (Vertical) of the 528th Engineer Battalion of the 225th Engineer Brigade is located in Bastrop.

== See also ==
- National Register of Historic Places listings in Morehouse Parish, Louisiana
