= Bastrop, Louisiana =

City in Louisiana, United States

- City
- Nicknames: Strop City, Little Monroe
- Motto: The City of Spirit, Pride, and Progress
- Interactive map of Bastrop, Louisiana
- Coordinates: 32°45′25″N 91°53′25″W
- Country: United States
- State: Louisiana
- Parish: Morehouse
- City Charter: 1852 (174 years ago)
- Founded by: Felipe Enrique Neri, Baron de Bastrop
- Named after: Baron de Bastrop

Government
  - Type: Mayor and Board of Aldermen/City Council
  - Mayor: Mark Moore Sr.

Area
  - Total: 8.56 sq mi (22.17 km^{2})
  - Land: 8.56 sq mi (22.17 km^{2})
  - Water: 0 sq mi (0.00 km^{2})
- Elevation: 121 ft (37 m)

Population (2020)
  - Total: 9,691
  - Density: 1,132.4/sq mi (437.21/km^{2})
- Time zone: UTC-6 (CST)
  - Summer (DST): UTC-5 (CDT)
- ZIP Code: 71220
- Area code: 318
- FIPS code: 22-04685
- GNIS feature ID: 2403818
- Website: www.cityofbastrop.com

Bastrop is a city in Morehouse Parish, Louisiana, United States. It is the parish seat of Morehouse Parish. Its population was 9,691 at the 2020 census, down from 11,365 in 2010. The population of Bastrop is 76% African American. It is included in the Monroe metropolitan statistical area and is part of the Monroe–Ruston combined statistical area.

== History ==
Bastrop was founded by Felipe Enrique Neri, Baron de Bastrop, a Dutch businessman accused as an embezzler. He had fled to the then-Spanish colony of Louisiana to escape prosecution and became involved in various land deals. In New Spain, he falsely claimed to be a nobleman. He received a large grant of land, provided that he could settle 450 families on it over the next several years. He was unable to do this, and lost the grant. Afterwards, he moved to Texas, where he claimed to oppose the sale of Louisiana to the United States and became a minor government official. He proved instrumental in Moses Austin's plan (and later, that of his son, Stephen F. Austin) to bring American colonists to what was then northern Mexico.

Bastrop formally incorporated in 1857, and is the commercial and industrial center of Morehouse Parish. In the 19th century, it was notable as the western edge of the great North Louisiana swamp, but more favorable terrain resulted in the antebellum rail line connecting to Monroe, further to the south.

Bastrop was a Confederate stronghold during the American Civil War until January 1865, when 3,000 cavalrymen led by Colonel Embury D. Osband of the 3rd United States Colored Cavalry Regiment, embarked from Memphis, Tennessee, for northeastern Louisiana.

During the Great Mississippi Flood of 1927, Bastrop was the site of a relief camp for refugees. During World War II, it was the site of a German prisoner-of-war camp.

Bastrop is the parish seat of Morehouse Parish and is within an area marketed to tourists as the Sportsman's Paradise region of Louisiana. It is a Main Street Community and has received Transportation Enhancement funding for improvements in its historic district.

Celebrations and concerts are held in the historic downtown at the restored 1914 Morehouse Parish Courthouse and Rose Theater. Bastrop is home to the Snyder Museum and Creative Arts Center, housed in the circa 1929 home of a local family. Volunteers lead heritage appreciation tours for children and interpret the history of the parish using local artifacts.

== Geography ==
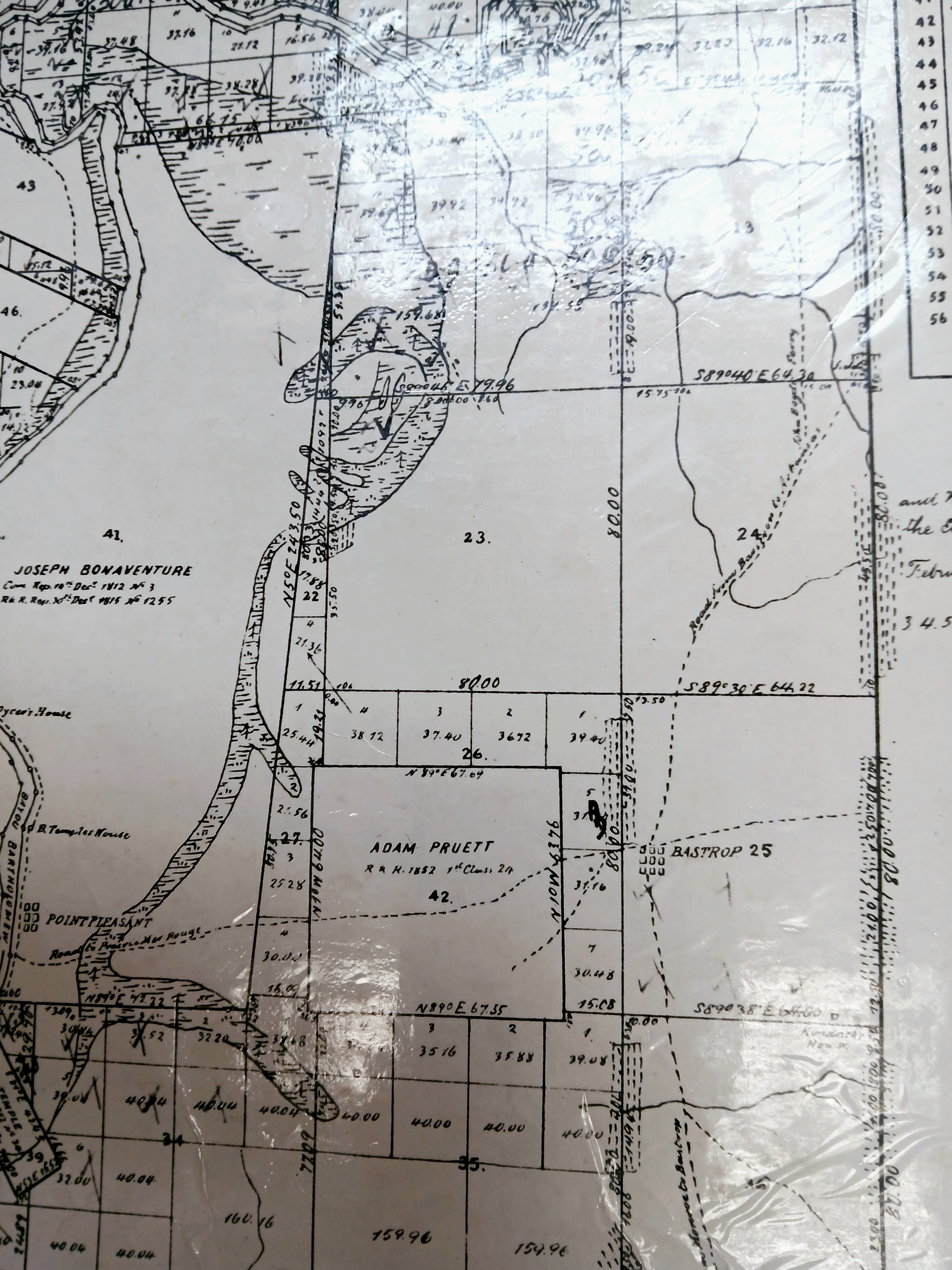
Township 21 North, Range 6 East

Bastrop is located in western Morehouse Parish, at the crossroads of U.S. Highway 425 and U.S. Highway 165 (Madison Avenue).

According to the United States Census Bureau, Bastrop has a total area of 8.59 square miles (22.2 km^{2}), all of it land.

=== Climate ===
Bastrop has a humid subtropical climate (Köppen: Cfa) with hot summers and mild winters. It has fairly uniform precipitation throughout the year.

Climate data for Bastrop, Louisiana (1991–2020 normals, extremes 1893–1900, 1921–1925, 1935–present)
Month	Jan	Feb	Mar	Apr	May	Jun	Jul	Aug	Sep	Oct	Nov	Dec	Year
Record high °F (°C)	84 (29)	87 (31)	93 (34)	94 (34)	101 (38)	108 (42)	108 (42)	107 (42)	110 (43)	100 (38)	89 (32)	89 (32)	110 (43)
Mean daily maximum °F (°C)	53.8 (12.1)	58.2 (14.6)	66.9 (19.4)	74.3 (23.5)	81.0 (27.2)	88.0 (31.1)	90.6 (32.6)	90.6 (32.6)	86.3 (30.2)	76.2 (24.6)	64.4 (18.0)	56.2 (13.4)	73.9 (23.3)
Daily mean °F (°C)	43.8 (6.6)	47.5 (8.6)	55.2 (12.9)	62.9 (17.2)	71.0 (21.7)	78.4 (25.8)	81.1 (27.3)	80.5 (26.9)	75.2 (24.0)	64.2 (17.9)	53.3 (11.8)	46.2 (7.9)	63.3 (17.4)
Mean daily minimum °F (°C)	33.9 (1.1)	36.8 (2.7)	43.6 (6.4)	51.5 (10.8)	61.0 (16.1)	68.7 (20.4)	71.5 (21.9)	70.3 (21.3)	64.1 (17.8)	52.3 (11.3)	42.1 (5.6)	36.3 (2.4)	52.7 (11.5)
Record low °F (°C)	4 (−16)	−12 (−24)	15 (−9)	28 (−2)	39 (4)	48 (9)	54 (12)	51 (11)	37 (3)	21 (−6)	18 (−8)	3 (−16)	−12 (−24)
Average precipitation inches (mm)	5.72 (145)	4.91 (125)	4.94 (125)	6.14 (156)	5.21 (132)	4.13 (105)	4.58 (116)	4.68 (119)	3.41 (87)	5.11 (130)	4.37 (111)	5.19 (132)	58.39 (1,483)
Average precipitation days (≥ 0.01 in)	10.3	8.5	8.8	7.3	9.0	8.3	7.9	6.5	5.8	6.5	8.3	8.6	95.8
Source: NOAA

== Demographics ==
Historical population
Census	Pop.	Note	%±
1860	481		—
1870	521		8.3%
1880	822		57.8%
1900	787		—
1910	854		8.5%
1920	1,216		42.4%
1930	5,121		321.1%
1940	6,626		29.4%
1950	12,769		92.7%
1960	15,193		19.0%
1970	14,713		−3.2%
1980	15,527		5.5%
1990	13,916		−10.4%
2000	12,988		−6.7%
2010	11,365		−12.5%
2020	9,691		−14.7%
2025 (est.)	8,908	▼	−8.1%
U.S. Decennial Census

Bastrop racial makeup as of 2020
Race	Num.	Perc.
White	1,928	19.9%
Black or African American	7,345	75.8%
Native American	24	0.2%
Asian	29	0.3%
Other/mixed	365	3.8%
Hispanic or Latino	97	1.0%

As of the 2020 United States census, 9,691 people, 3,834 households, and 2,273 families resided in the city.

== Economy ==
In 2008, International Paper Company, the largest area employer, ceased operations of its Bastrop mill.

In 2009, poultry processor Pilgrim's Pride closed multiple facilities in the area, which impacted the economy of Bastrop. DG Foods opened a poultry processing plant at Bastrop in 2011.

In 2015, a wood pellet facility opened in Bastrop, employing 64 people.

The 1023rd Engineer Company (Vertical) of the 528th Engineer Battalion of the 225th Engineer Brigade is located in Bastrop.

== Arts and culture ==
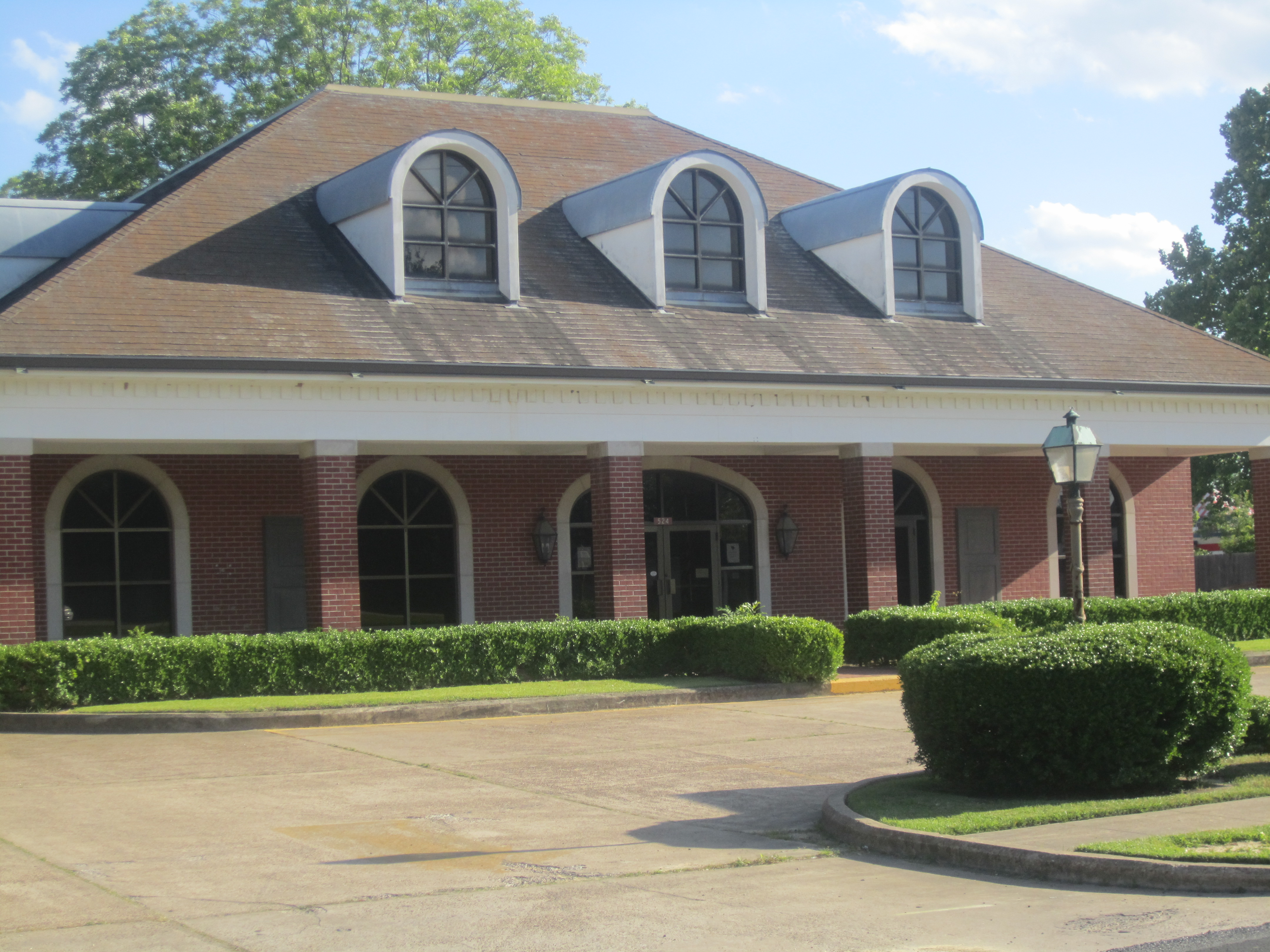
Morehouse Parish Library in Bastrop

A branch of the Morehouse Parish Public Library System is located in Bastrop.

== Government ==
Bastrop is governed by a mayor, Mark Moore Sr,and a city council, which includes:

- Angela Tappin, District A
- Henry Doaty, District B
- James Green, District C
- Darry Green, District D
- Howard Loche, District E

== Education ==
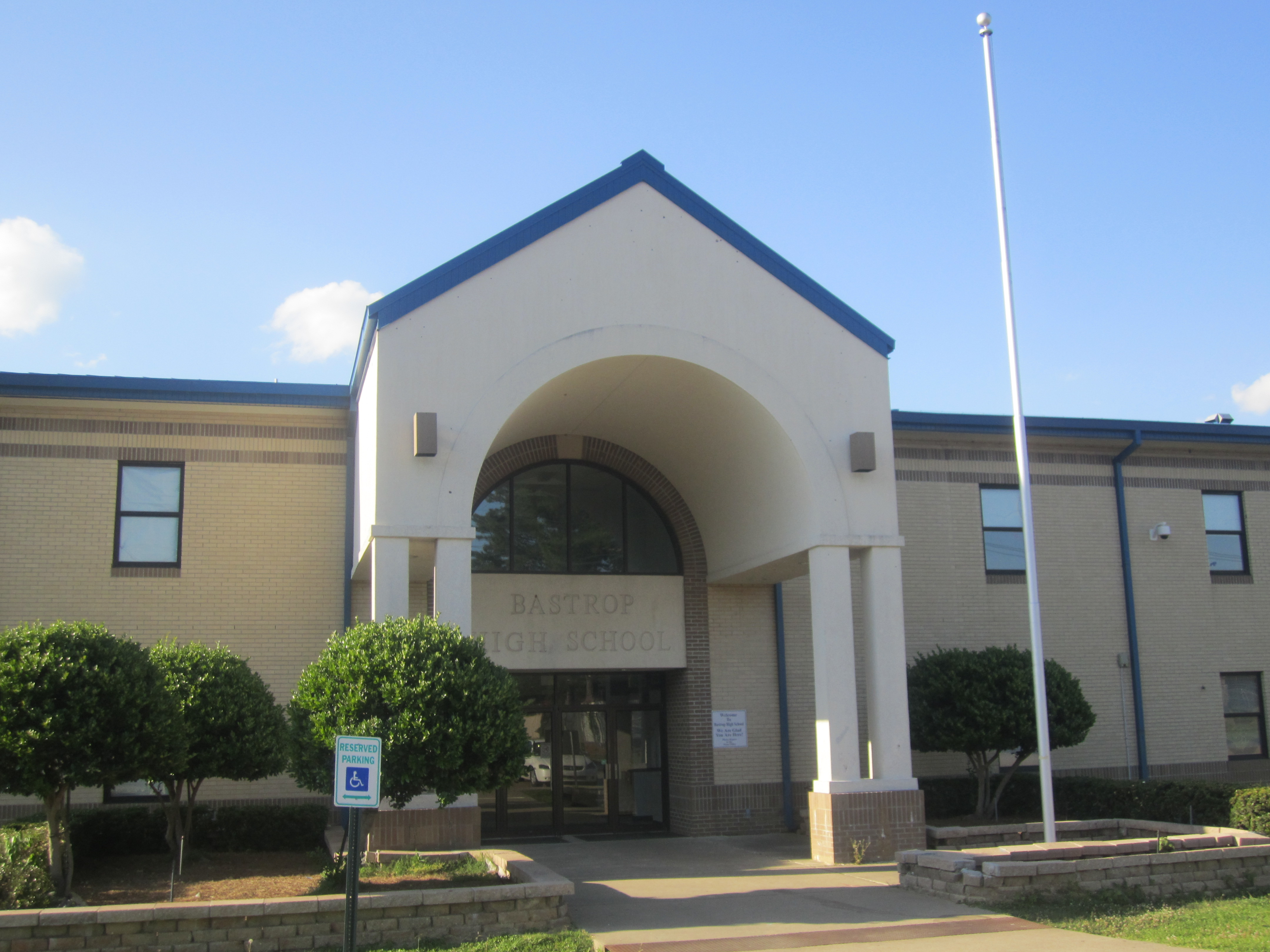
Bastrop High School

=== Public schools ===
Public schools located in Bastrop are operated by the Morehouse Parish School Board, and include:

- Bastrop High School
- Beekman Charter School
- Morehouse Elementary School
- Morehouse Magnet School

=== Private schools ===
Prairie View Academy is a private school in Bastrop serving kindergarten to grade 12.

=== Postsecondary schools ===
Louisiana Delta Community College has a campus in Bastrop.

=== Bastrop High School prayer controversy ===
In 2011, graduating senior Damon Fowler objected to prayer at the Bastrop High School graduation exercises, claiming a looming violation of the First Amendment to the Constitution of the United States. The American Civil Liberties Union of Louisiana asked the school not to include a prayer in the May 20 graduation. At the Thursday night rehearsal for the graduation, senior Sarah Barlow included a prayer that explicitly mentioned Jesus Christ, and during the graduation, student Laci Mattice led people in the Lord's Prayer before a moment of silence. The school says that Mattice was told not to include a prayer. Fowler stated that after his objections became public he was ostracized by other students.

== Media ==
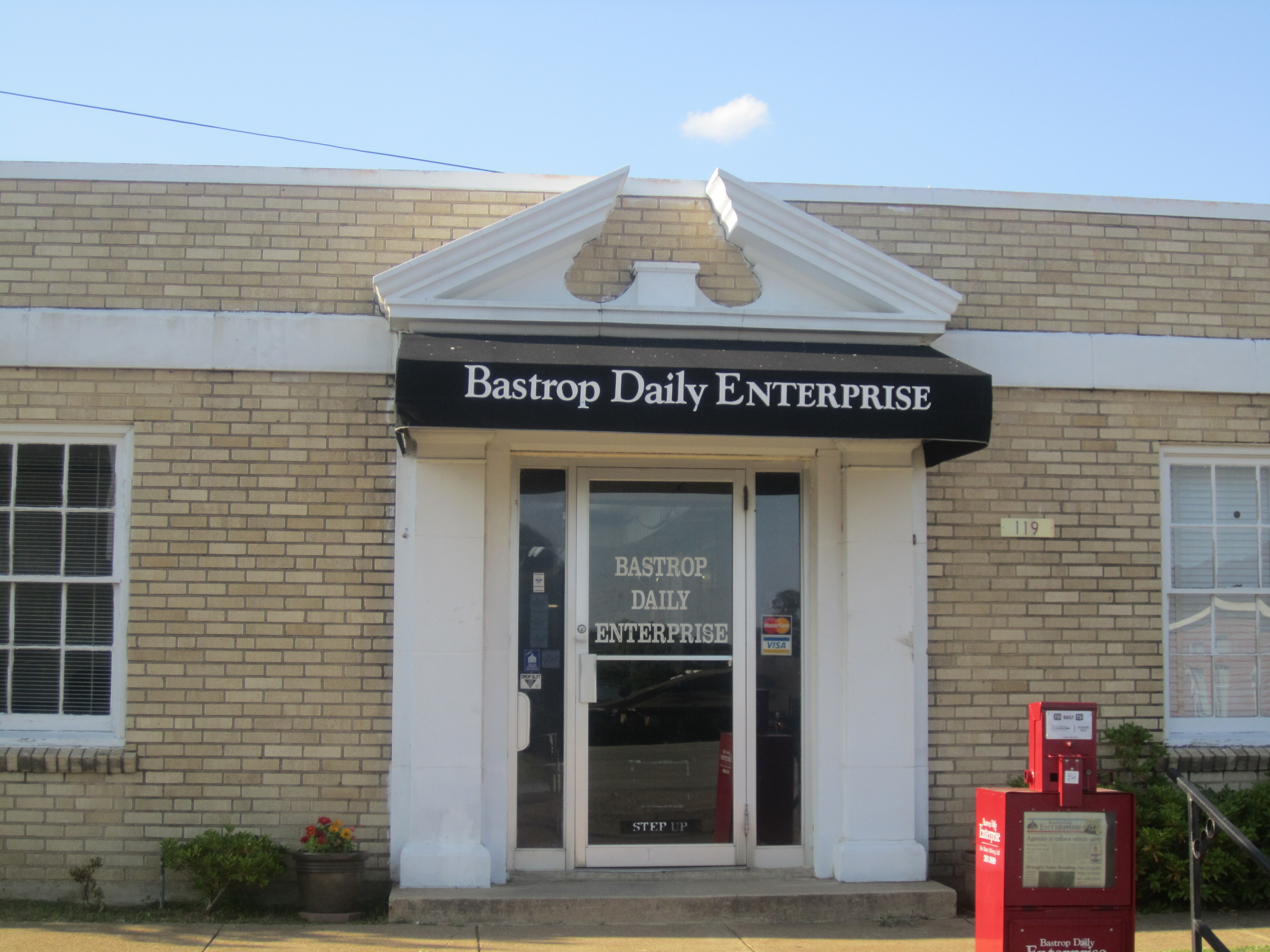
Bastrop Daily Enterprise newspaper office; closed in 2019

Bastrop and Morehouse Parish were until 2019 served by a daily newspaper, the Bastrop Daily Enterprise, which ceased operations because of financial and readership issues.

== Notable people ==
- Ronnie Coleman, professional bodybuilder
- Denzel Devall, college football player
- Bill Dickey, Major League Baseball (MLB) catcher for the New York Yankees
- Michael Echols, member of the Louisiana House of Representatives
- Stump Edington, MLB player who died in Bastrop
- David Ginn, state senator from Morehouse Parish from 1980 to 1988
- Amos T. Hall (1896–1971), lawyer, judge, and civil rights leader
- Luther E. Hall, governor of Louisiana
- Stacey Hawkins, United States Air Force major general
- Ed Head, MLB player who died in Bastrop
- Mable John, Motown Records singer born in Bastrop
- Jim Looney, NFL player
- Bob Love, NBA basketball player
- Calvin Natt, National Basketball Association [NBA) player with the Denver Nuggets
- Kenny Natt, NBA player drafted by Indiana Pacers in 1980
- Willie Parker, NFL and WFL player
- Rueben Randle, LSU Tigers football, wide receiver
- Shane Reynolds, MLB player
- John Wesley Ryles, country music singer, born in Bastrop in 1950
- Talance Sawyer, played for the Minnesota Vikings; born in Bastrop
- Dylan Scott, country music singer-songwriter
- Pat Williams, NFL player (Minnesota Vikings)
- Hulon B. Whittington, Medal of Honor recipient
