= List of highways numbered 817 =

State Road 817, Route 817, or Highway 817, may refer to routes in the following countries:

== Canada ==
- Alberta Highway 817

== Costa Rica ==
- National Route 817

== United States ==
- SR 817
- KY 817
- LA 817
  - LA 817-1
  - LA 817-2
  - LA 817-3
- MD 817
- PR-817

Preceded by 816	Lists of highways 817	Succeeded by 818
