= SR819 =

SR819 may refer to:

- S.R. 819- season six episode nine of The X-Files
- State Road 819- state roads numbered 819
