= List of highways numbered 819 =

The following highways are numbered 819:

== United States ==
- SR 819
- LA 819
  - LA 819-1
  - LA 819-2
  - LA 819-3
  - LA 819-4
  - LA 819-5
- MD 819
- PA 819
- PR-819
- FM 819

Preceded by 818	Lists of highways 819	Succeeded by 820
