= Louisiana Highway 819 =

State highway in Louisiana, United States

Louisiana Highway 819

- Routes of all LA 819 segments highlighted in red

Route information
- Maintained by Louisiana DOTD
- Length: 0.583 mi (938 m)
- Existed: 1955 renumbering–present

Location
- Country: United States
- State: Louisiana
- Parishes: Lincoln

Highway system
- Louisiana State Highway System; Interstate; US; State; Scenic
← LA 818	→ LA 820

Louisiana Highway 819 (LA 819) is a collection of five state-maintained streets located in the Lincoln Parish village of Choudrant that have a total length of 0.58 miles (0.93 km). All five routes were established in the 1955 Louisiana Highway renumbering and are presently unsigned.

== Louisiana Highway 819-1 ==
Louisiana Highway 819-1
- Location: Choudrant
- Length: 0.272 mi (438 m)
- Existed: 1955–present

Louisiana Highway 819-1 (LA 819-1) runs 0.27 miles (0.43 km) in a north–south direction along Oak Street from LA 819-5 (North Depot Street) to a dead end north of US 80. It is an undivided two-lane highway for its entire length.

The entire highway is in Choudrant, Lincoln Parish.

mi	km	Destinations	Notes
0.000	0.000	LA 819-5 (North Depot Street)	Southern terminus of LA 819-1; western terminus of LA 819-5
0.051	0.082	LA 819-4 (Allen Street)	Western terminus of LA 819-4
0.083	0.134	LA 819-3 (Green Street)	Eastern terminus of LA 819-3
0.197	0.317	US 80 – Ruston, Monroe	
0.272	0.438	End state maintenance at dead end	Northern terminus
1.000 mi = 1.609 km; 1.000 km = 0.621 mi

== Louisiana Highway 819-2 ==
Louisiana Highway 819-2
- Location: Choudrant
- Length: 0.108 mi (174 m)
- Existed: 1955–present

Louisiana Highway 819-2 (LA 819-2) runs 0.11 miles (0.18 km) in a north–south direction along Pecan Street from LA 819-3 (Green Street) to US 80. The route travels alongside Choudrant High School and is an undivided two-lane highway for its entire length.

The entire highway is in Choudrant, Lincoln Parish.

mi	km	Destinations	Notes
0.000	0.000	LA 819-3 (Green Street)	Southern terminus of LA 819-2; western terminus of LA 819-3
0.108	0.174	US 80 – Ruston, Monroe	Northern terminus
1.000 mi = 1.609 km; 1.000 km = 0.621 mi

== Louisiana Highway 819-3 ==
Louisiana Highway 819-3
- Location: Choudrant
- Length: 0.064 mi (103 m)
- Existed: 1955–present

Louisiana Highway 819-3 (LA 819-3) runs 0.06 miles (0.097 km) in an east–west direction along Green Street from LA 819-2 (Pecan Street) to LA 819-1 (Oak Street). It is an undivided two-lane highway for its entire length.

The entire highway is in Choudrant, Lincoln Parish.

mi	km	Destinations	Notes
0.000	0.000	LA 819-2 (Pecan Street)	Western terminus of LA 819-3; southern terminus of LA 819-2
0.064	0.103	LA 819-1 (Oak Street)	Eastern terminus
1.000 mi = 1.609 km; 1.000 km = 0.621 mi

== Louisiana Highway 819-4 ==
Louisiana Highway 819-4
- Location: Choudrant
- Length: 0.072 mi (116 m)
- Existed: 1955–present

Louisiana Highway 819-4 (LA 819-4) runs 0.07 miles (0.11 km) in an east–west direction along Allen Street from LA 819-1 (Oak Street) to LA 145 (Elm Street). It is an undivided two-lane highway for its entire length.

The entire highway is in Choudrant, Lincoln Parish.

mi	km	Destinations	Notes
0.000	0.000	LA 819-1 (Oak Street)	Western terminus
0.072	0.116	LA 145 (Elm Street)	Eastern terminus
1.000 mi = 1.609 km; 1.000 km = 0.621 mi

== Louisiana Highway 819-5 ==
Louisiana Highway 819-5
- Location: Choudrant
- Length: 0.067 mi (108 m)
- Existed: 1955–present

Louisiana Highway 819-5 (LA 819-5) runs 0.07 miles (0.11 km) in an east–west direction along North Depot Street from LA 819-1 (Oak Street) to LA 145 (Elm Street). It is an undivided two-lane highway for its entire length.

The entire highway is in Choudrant, Lincoln Parish.

mi	km	Destinations	Notes
0.000	0.000	LA 819-1 (Oak Street)	Western terminus of LA 819-5; southern terminus of LA 819-1
0.067	0.108	LA 145 (Elm Street)	Eastern terminus
1.000 mi = 1.609 km; 1.000 km = 0.621 mi
