= Ruston High School =

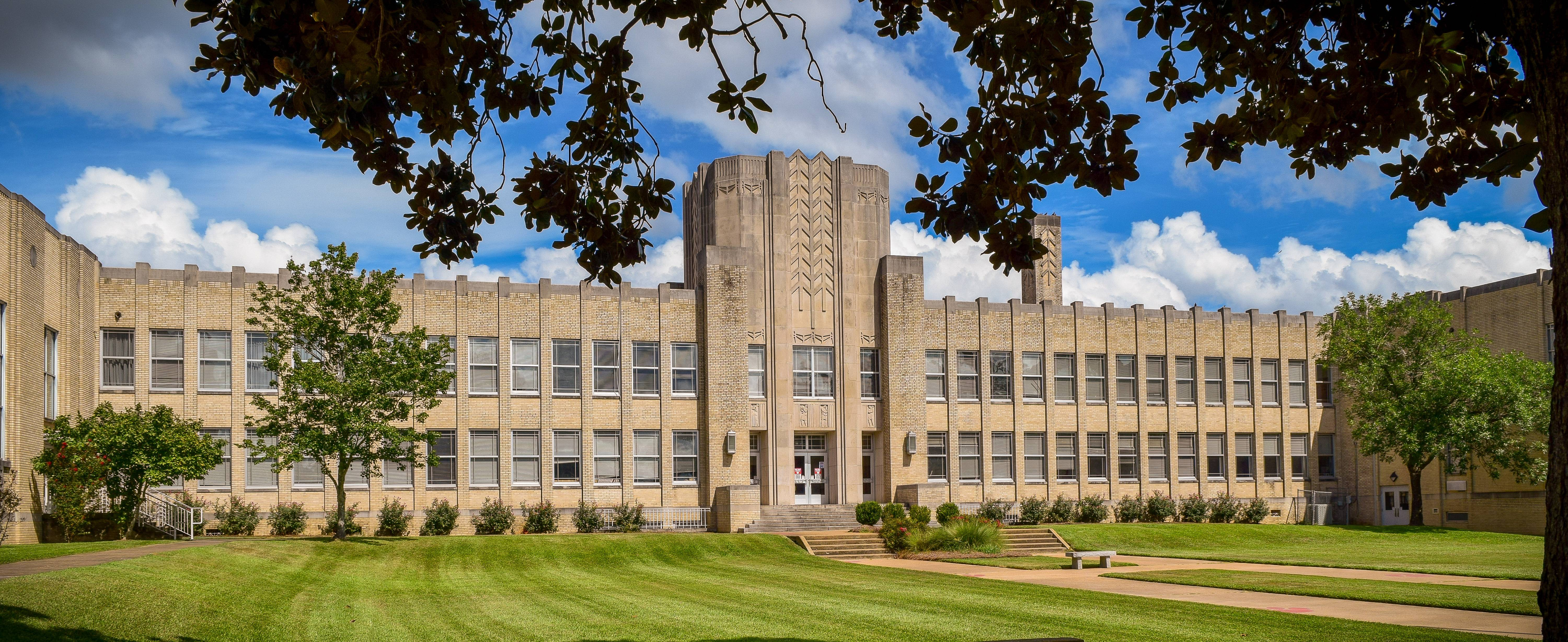
- Ruston High School in 2020.

Location
- 900 Bearcat Drive; Ruston, Louisiana, 71270; United States

Information
- Type: 4-year, Public high school
- Motto: Firmly Founded
- Established: 1921 building built 1939
- School board: Lincoln Parish School Board
- Director: Jerrod Baugh, Athletic Director & Head Football Coach
- Principal: Teri Howe
- Staff: 99.97 (FTE)
- Grades: 9-12
- Enrollment: 1,254 (2026–2028)
- Student to teacher ratio: 12.77
- Classes offered: Traditional, Project Based Learning
- Hours in school day: 8
- Classrooms: 350-450
- Campus: Ruston High School
- Campus size: Small
- Colors: Red, white and grey
- Fight song: On, On You Bearcats!
- Athletics: Baseball, Basketball, Cross Country, Football, Golf, Powerlifting, Soccer, Softball, Swimming, Tennis, Track & Field, Volleyball
- Athletics conference: LHSAA Division I Non-Select District 2-5A
- Mascot: Bearcats
- Rivals: Neville High School; West Monroe High School; Ouachita Parish High School; Alexandria Senior High School
- Publication: Chatterbox Newspaper, Bearcat Nation Network, KBNF 101.3 Bearcat Radio
- Yearbook: The Resume
- Website: RustonHigh.LincolnSchools.org
- Ruston High School
- U.S. National Register of Historic Places
- Location within Louisiana Location within the United States
- Location: 900 Bearcat Drive, Ruston, Louisiana
- Coordinates: 32°32′05″N 92°39′01″W
- Area: 7 acres (2.8 ha)
- Built: 1939
- Built by: Caldwell Brothers & Hart
- Architects: J.W. Smith & Associates
- Architectural style: Art Deco
- NRHP reference No.: 92001335
- Added to NRHP: October 8, 1992

Ruston High School is a four-year public high school located in Lincoln Parish School District of Ruston, Louisiana, United States. It was founded in 1921, and the current high school was built in 1939 by the PWA near the campus of Louisiana Tech University.

== Background ==
The 7 acres (2.8 ha) campus of Ruston High School consists of two buildings, which were added to the National Register of Historic Places on October 8, 1992.

The mascot is the Bearcats, with the school colors being red, white, and gray. Black students were first admitted in 1970. Ruston High School also serves as a memorial to the survivors of the Gulf War.

== Athletics ==
=== Classification ===
The Ruston Bearcats competes in the LHSAA. The Bearcats compete in the highest classification in Louisiana (5A) and participates in District 2-5A.

=== Football ===
The Bearcats play in T. L. James Field at Hoss Garrett Stadium, located across the street from Ruston High.

==== Championships ====
- (1) National Championship: 1990
- (9) State Championships: 1925, 1941, 1947, 1951, 1982, 1986, 1988, 1990, 2023
- (6) State Runner-Up: 1944, 1984, 1998, 2022, 2024, 2025

==== Coaches ====
- Jimmy "Chick" Childress - Louisiana Sports Hall of Fame head football coach, Jimmy "Chick" Childress, was head coach at Ruston High from 1979 to 1990. During his twelve seasons at the school, he compiled a 131–27–0 record and won four state championships in 1982, 1986, 1988 and 1990. His 1990 team finished undefeated and was ranked No. 1 nationally.
- L. J. “Hoss” Garrett - Louisiana Sports Hall of Fame head football coach, L. J. “Hoss” Garrett, was head coach at Ruston High for thirty-five of his thirty-eight years as a head coach retiring in 1971. He compiled an overall record of 270–122–21 and won three state championships in 1941, 1947 and 1951. His teams at Ruston won forty-seven straight regular-season games from 1951 through the 1954 season.

== Radio ==
The school owns a radio station, KBNF-LP (101.3 FM, "Bearcat Radio"), founded in 2014, which broadcasts to the Ruston area with a 80s classic hits format. The broadcast license is held by the Lincoln Parish School Board. Ruston High School is one of two high schools in the state of Louisiana with a student radio program broadcasting to the Ruston area.

== Campus ==
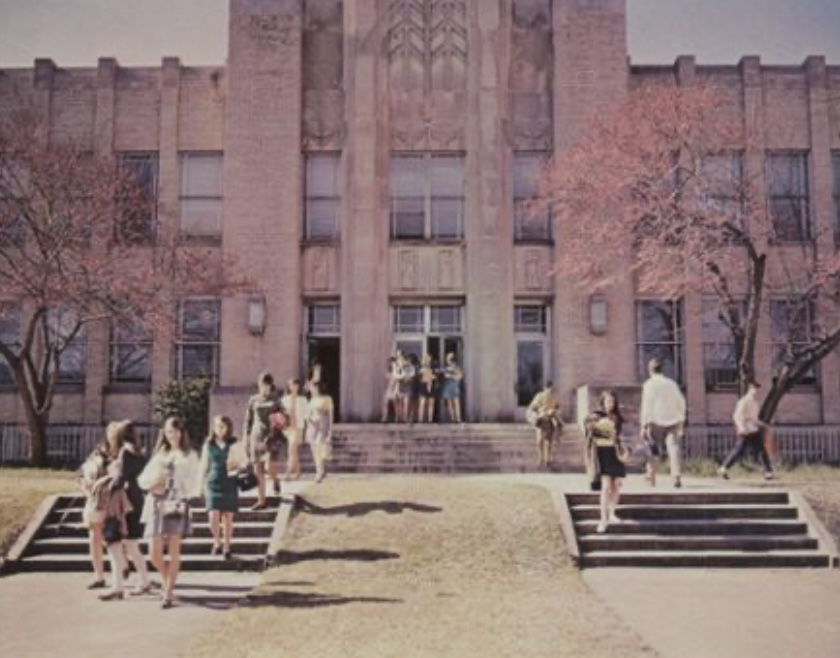
Main steps 1969

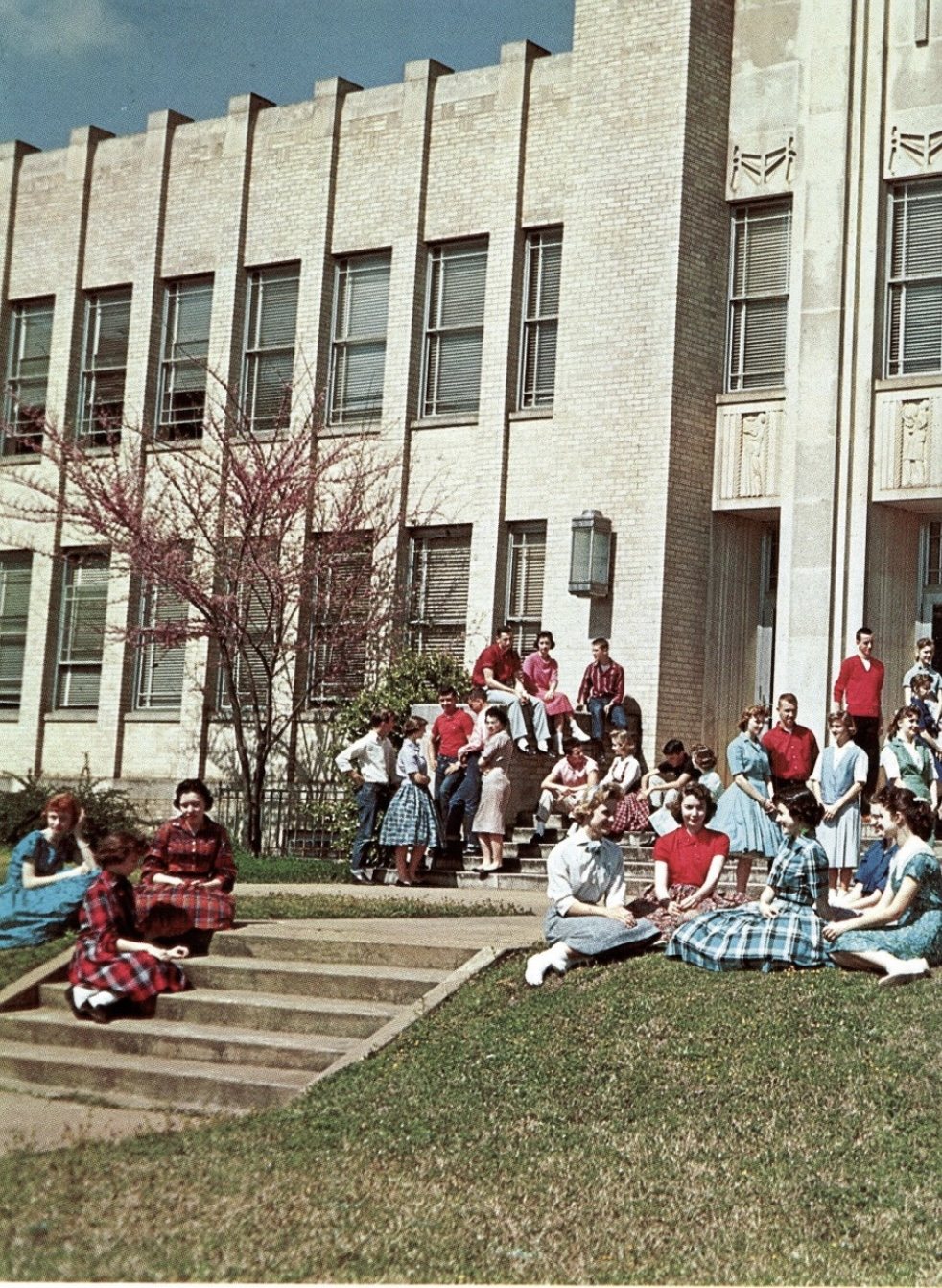
Main steps 1962

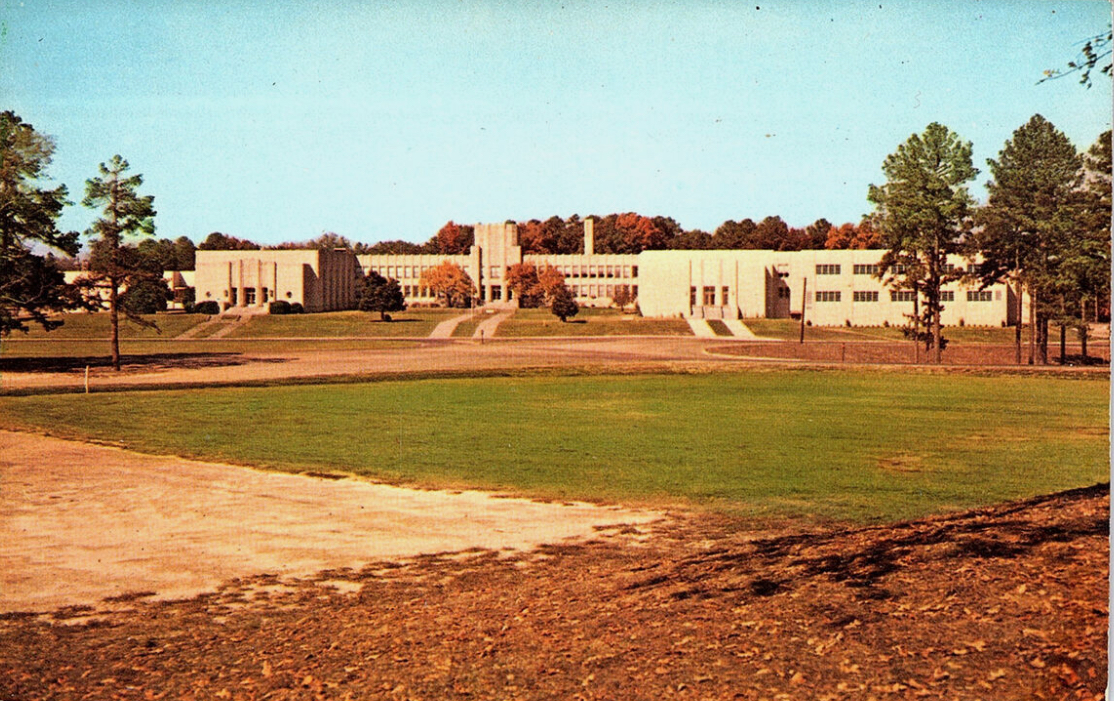
Ruston High School Postcard c.1968

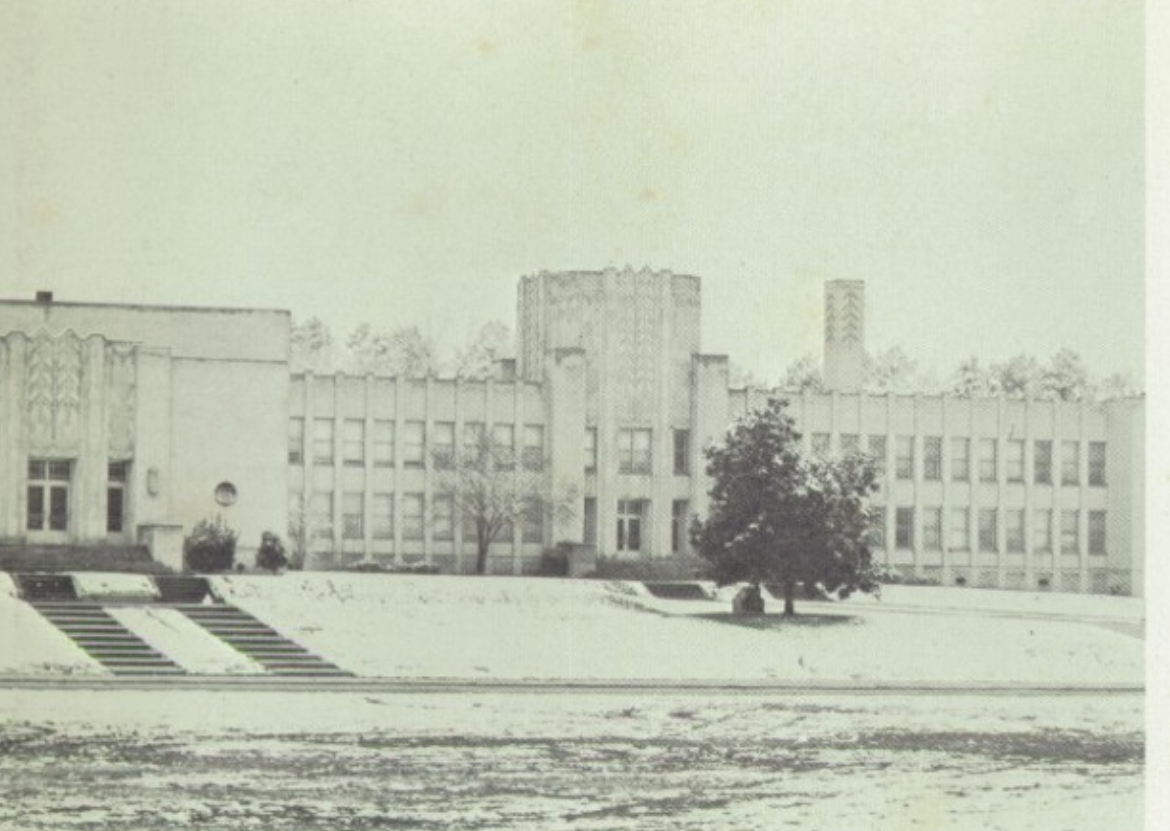
The school circa 1960

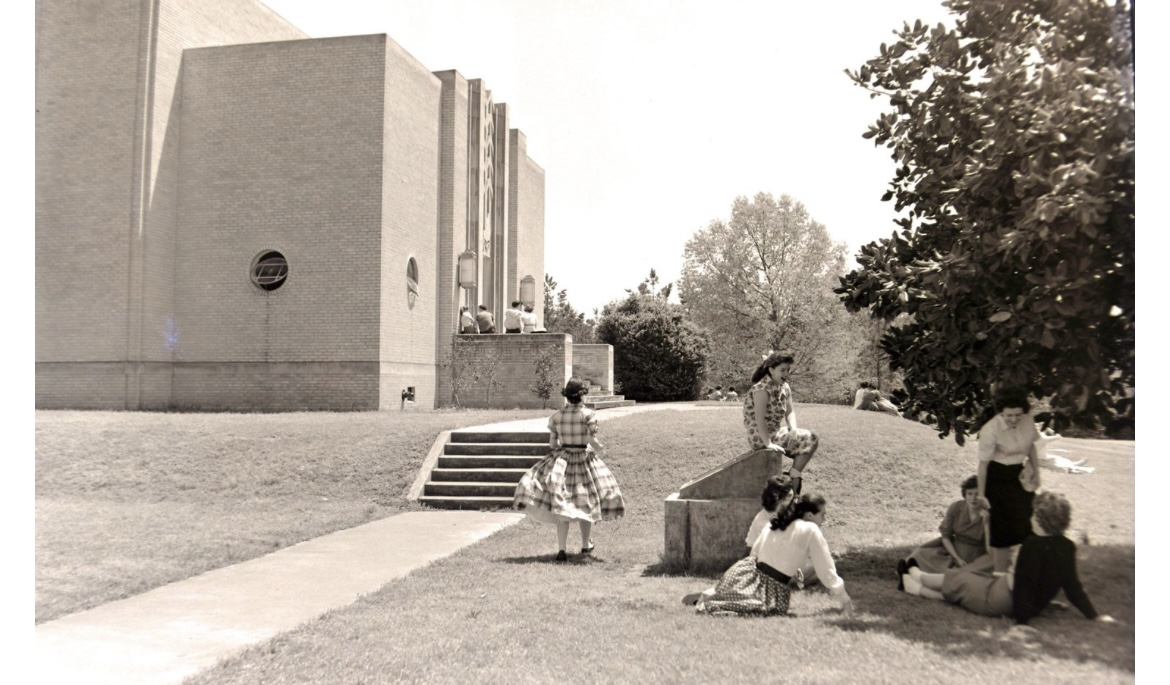
The school's auditorium c.1950s

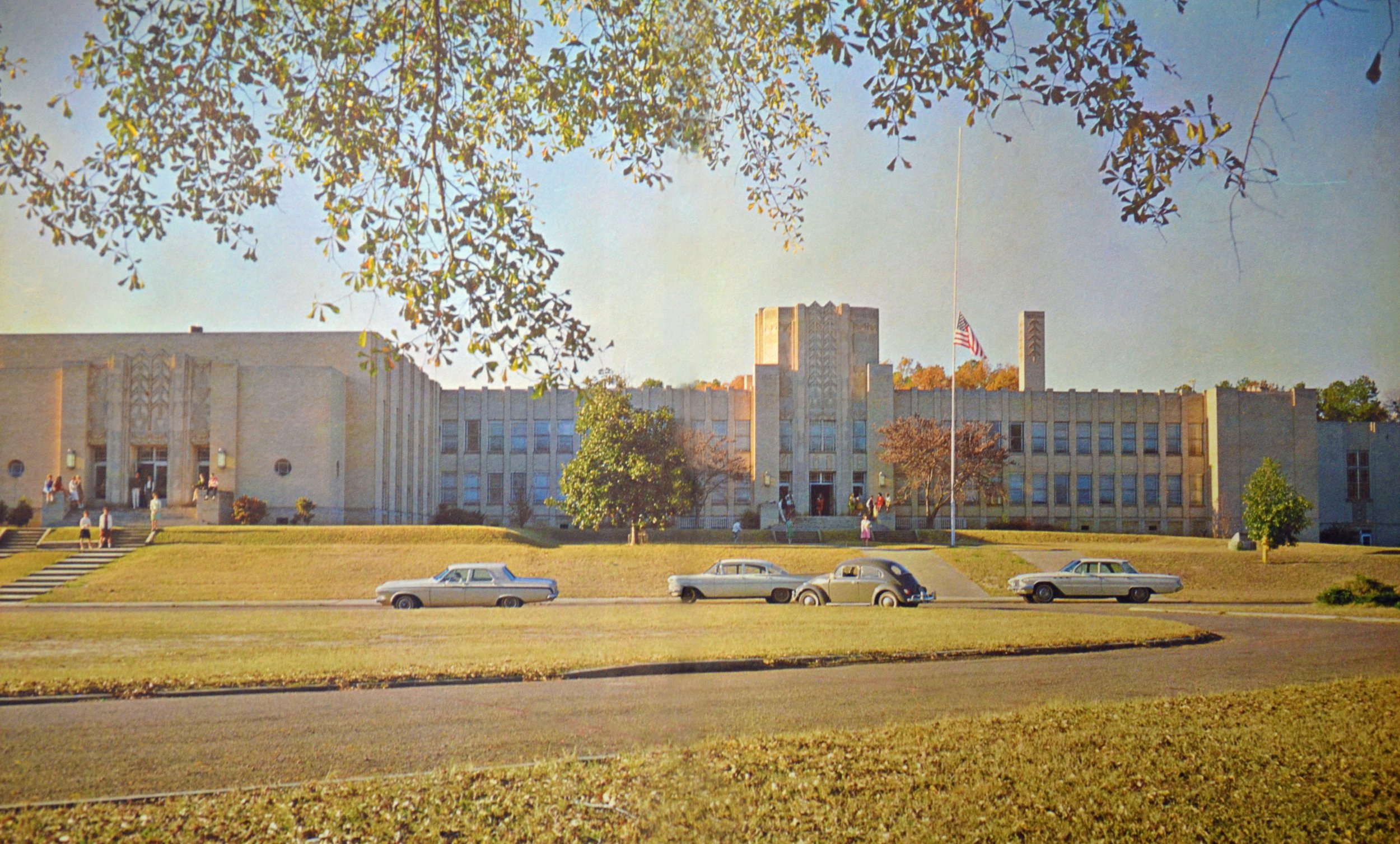
The school circa 1965

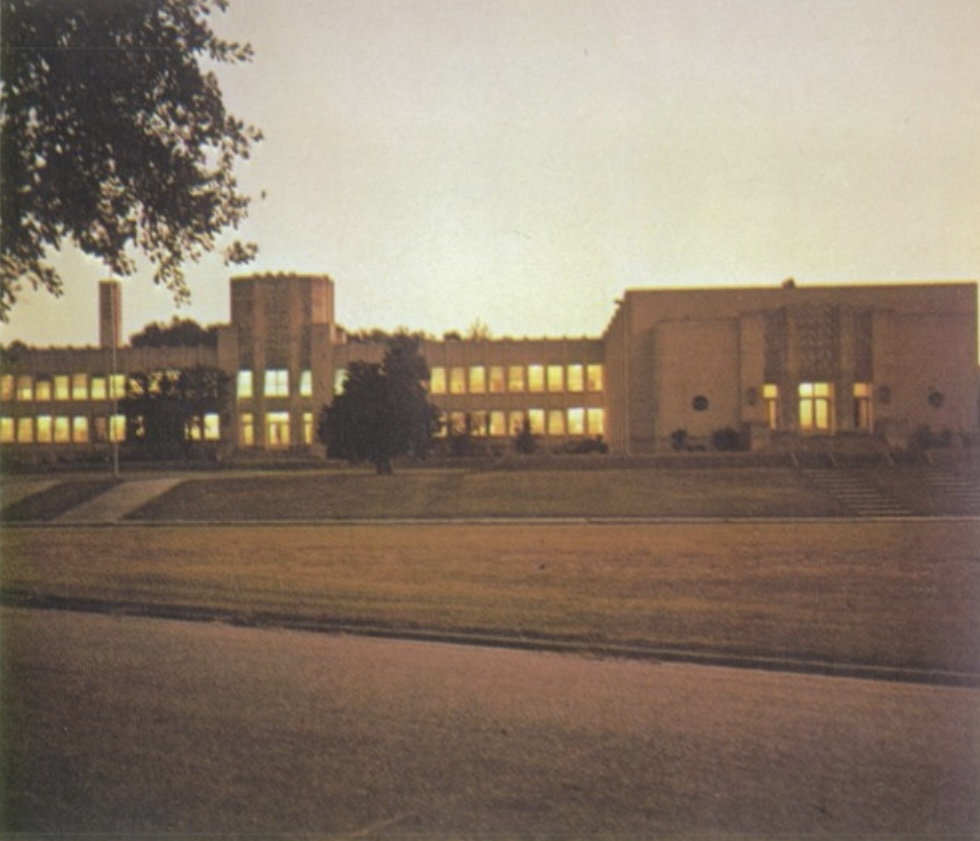
Ruston High School Front view c.1969

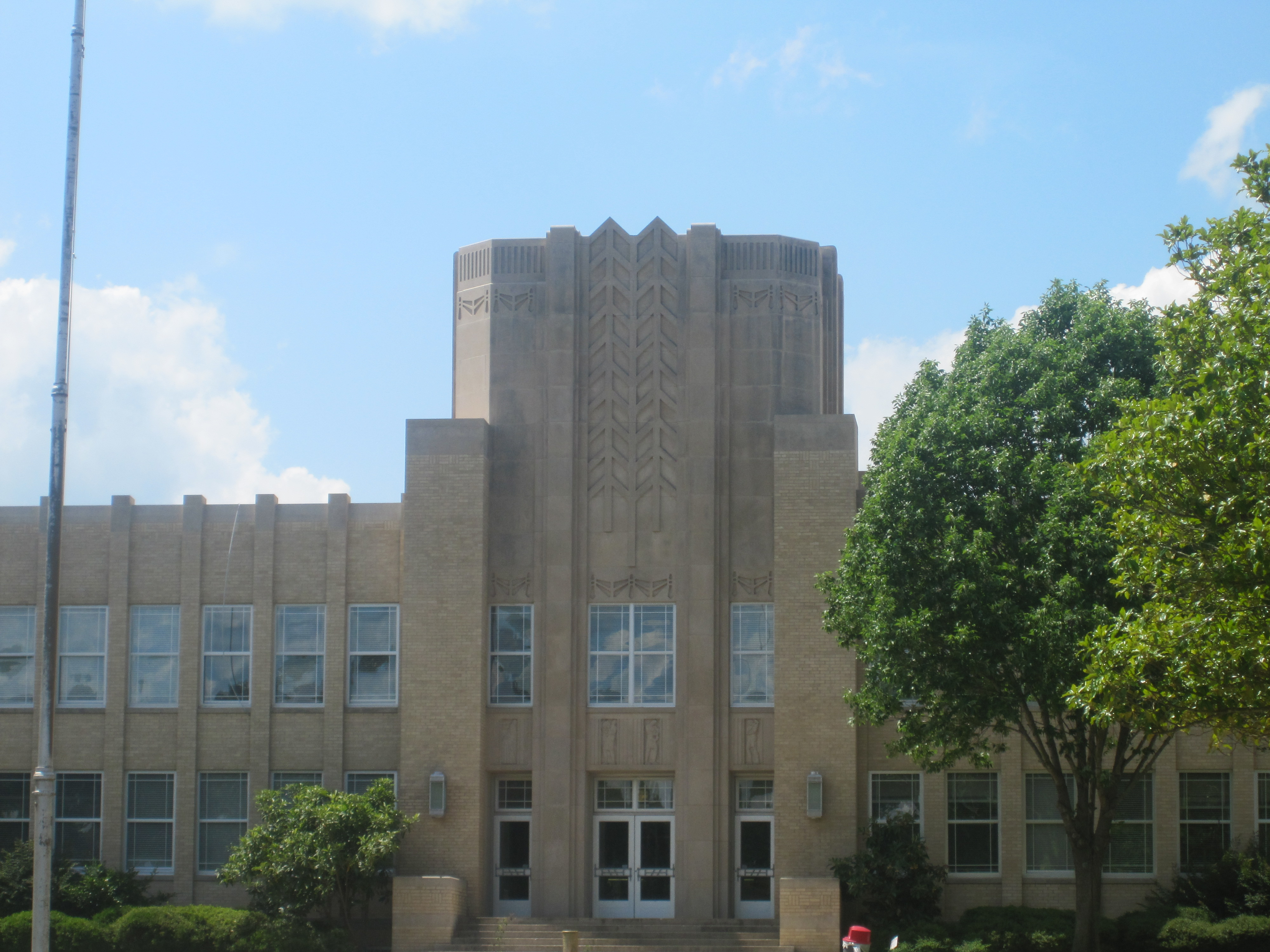
Front view, 2010

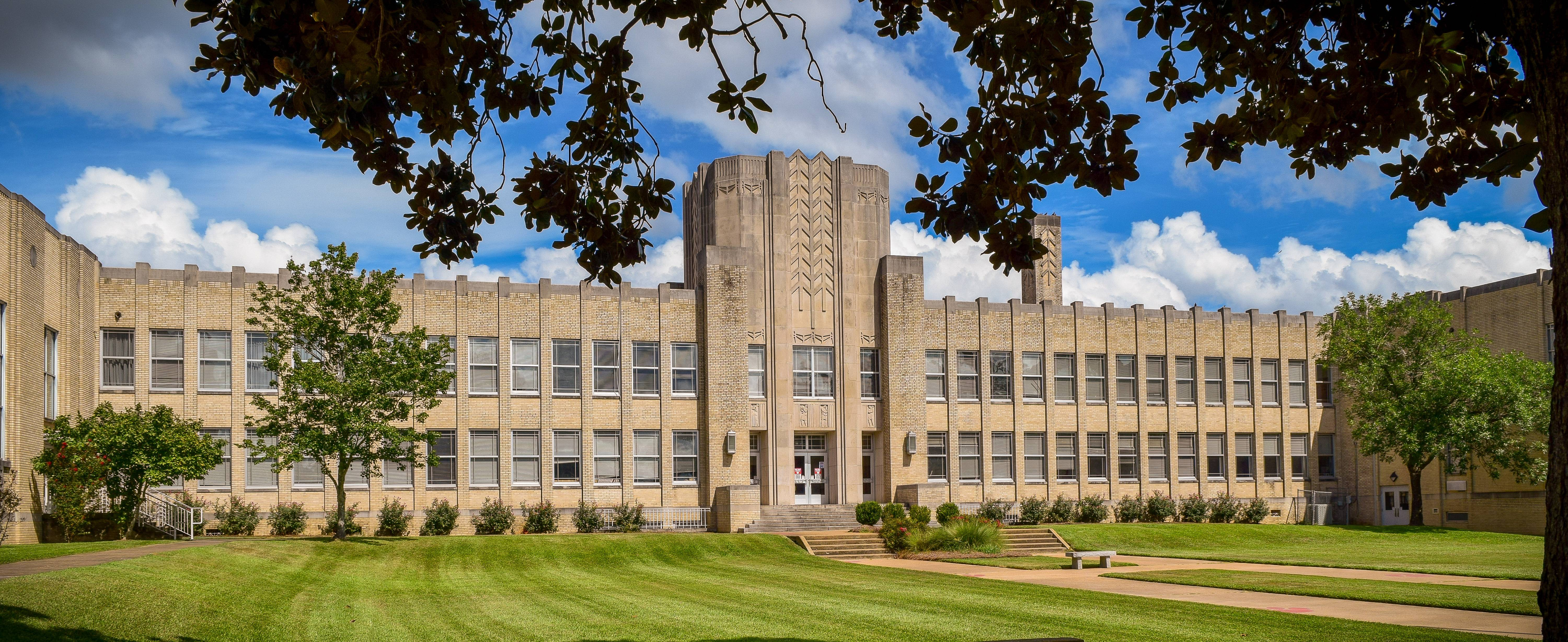
Ruston High School 2020

== Notable alumni ==
- Leon Barmore -- Louisiana Tech Lady Techsters basketball coach 1977–2002.
- Kentrell Brice (class of 2013) -- NFL player
- Wayne Cage, Former MLB player (Cleveland Indians)
- Martie Cordaro (class of 1991) -- (born April 8, 1973 in Ruston, La.) attended Louisiana Tech University. He is current President and minority owner Omaha Storm Chasers, Minor League Baseball Triple-A Kansas City Royals and Union Omaha USL League One pro soccer. Cordaro was the 2013 MiLB Baseball America executive of the year.
- Fred Dean—inductee into the NFL Pro Football Hall of Fame, played for Louisiana Tech, San Diego Chargers, and San Francisco 49ers
- Cade Gibson (Class of 2016) -- MLB pitcher for the Miami Marlins
- Andy Hamilton, NFL player
- Bert Jones -- NFL Quarterback, nicknamed "the Ruston Rifle", played for LSU earning Heisman Trophy contention and All-America honors for his 1972 season and inducted into the College Football Hall of Fame in 2016. He was the 1973 NFL 2nd overall draft pick by the Baltimore Colts and later played for the Los Angeles Rams
- Michael Brooks (Class of 1982) (born October 2, 1964, in Ruston, Louisiana) is a former American football linebacker in the National Football League. He played for Ruston High School, college ball at Louisiana State University (LSU), then professionally with the Denver Broncos, New York Giants, and the Detroit Lions.
- Kyle Williams (Class of 2002) (born June 10, 1983, in Ruston, Louisiana) is a retired American football defensive tackle of the Buffalo Bills in the National Football League. He was drafted in the fifth-round of the 2006 NFL Draft and played his entire 13-year career with the Bills. He served as defensive coordinator for the Bearcats from 2020-2024. He served as the Defensive Line Coach for the LSU Tigers for the 2025 season. He is returning to Ruston High for the 2026 season and will serve as both Assistant Athletics Director and Assistant Head Coach for the Bearcats.
- Jack Ramsaur II (attended in the 1970s) Maj. Gen. Jack W. Ramsaur II is the mobilization assistant to the Commander, Headquarters Air Education and Training Command, Randolph Air Force Base, Texas.
- Jeff Mangum (Class of 1989) Born October 24, 1970. Musician best known for being the lyricist, vocalist and guitarist of the band Neutral Milk Hotel, as well as being one of the cofounders of The Elephant 6 Recording Company.
- Robert Schneider (Class of 1989) Born March 9, 1971. Musician and record producer best known as the leader of pop band The Apples in stereo, as well as being one of the cofounders of The Elephant 6 Recording Company.
- George Stone, Former MLB player (Atlanta Braves, New York Mets)
- Will Cullen Hart (Class of 1990) Born May 29, 1971. Musician best known as a leader of psychedelic-pop band The Olivia Tremor Control, as well as being one of the cofounders of The Elephant 6 Recording Company.
- Rodney Young (Class of 1991), Played college football at LSU, played 4 year of NFL football (New York Giants).
- Mike Green (Class of 1996), (born December 6, 1976, in Ruston, Louisiana) is a retired American football safety and cornerback for the NFL. He played football at Ruston High School and Northwestern State. He was drafted by the Chicago Bears as the last player drafted in the 2000 NFL draft making him that year's "Mr. Irrelevant". He later played for the Seattle Seahawks and the Washington Redskins.
- Isaiah Buggs (Class of 2015) Ranked by Rivals as 2017 #1 Juco player in the nation. Starting Defensive End at the University of Alabama and a 2018 College Football Playoff National Champion. He was previously an American football defensive tackle for the Detroit Lions in the National Football League. He was drafted in the sixth-round of the 2019 NFL Draft by the Pittsburgh Steelers.
- Scotty Thurman (Class of 2013) an American former professional basketball player and current head coach at Little Rock Parkview.
- Kenny Wright played football at Ruston High School, Northwestern State University, University of Arkansas, and was drafted by the Minnesota Vikings in 1999. He is currently the Defensive Backs Coach for the Bearcats.

== See also ==
- National Register of Historic Places listings in Lincoln Parish, Louisiana
