= Corinth, Louisiana =

- Unincorporated community
- Location within Louisiana Location within the United States
- Coordinates: 32°43′47″N 92°47′16″W
- Country: United States
- State: Louisiana
- Parish: Lincoln
- Elevation: 253 ft (77 m)
- Time zone: UTC-6 (Central (CST))
  - Summer (DST): UTC-5 (CDT)
- Area code: 318
- GNIS feature ID: 540799

Corinth is an unincorporated community in Lincoln Parish, Louisiana, United States.
