= Hilly, Louisiana =

- Unincorporated community
- Location within Louisiana Location within the United States
- Coordinates: 32°38′55″N 92°40′43″W
- Country: United States
- State: Louisiana
- Parish: Lincoln
- Elevation: 220 ft (67 m)
- Time zone: UTC-6 (Central (CST))
  - Summer (DST): UTC-5 (CDT)
- Area code: 318
- GNIS feature ID: 554716

Hilly is an unincorporated community in Lincoln Parish, Louisiana, United States.
