= List of highways numbered 818 =

The following highways are numbered 818:

== United States ==
- AR 818
- SR 818
- LA 818
- MD 818
- PR-818
- SC 818 (former)
- FM 818

Preceded by 817	Lists of highways 818	Succeeded by 819
