= Lincoln Parish School Board =

United States School Board

Coordinates: 32.5246°N 92.6316°W

Lincoln Parish School Board is a school district headquartered in Ruston, Louisiana, United States. The district serves Lincoln Parish.

State Representative Rob Shadoin, a Republican lawyer from Ruston, is a former member of the board.

== Schools ==
=== K-12 schools ===
School	City/Zip
Simsboro High School	(Simsboro)

=== 7-12 schools ===
School	City/Zip
Choudrant High School	(Choudrant)

=== 9-12 schools ===
- Ruston High School (Ruston)

=== K-8 schools ===
- A. E. Phillips Laboratory School (Ruston)

=== 7-8 schools ===
- Ruston Junior High School (Ruston)

=== PK, 4-6 schools ===
- Lincoln Center School (Ruston)

=== 6 Schools ===
- I. A. Lewis Elementary School (Ruston)

=== Elementary schools ===
K-6

- Choudrant Elementary School (Choudrant)
- Hico Elementary School (Unincorporated area)

K-5

- Cypress Springs Elementary School (Ruston)
- Glen View Elementary School (Ruston)
- Hillcrest Elementary School (Ruston)
- Ruston Elementary School (Ruston)
