= Rodney Young (American football) =

American football player (born 1973)

No. 47
- Position: Defensive back

Personal information
- Born: January 25, 1973 (age 53); Grambling, Louisiana, U.S.
- Listed height: 6 ft 2 in (1.88 m)
- Listed weight: 210 lb (95 kg)

Career information
- High school: Ruston (LA)
- College: LSU
- NFL draft: 1995: 3rd round, 85th overall pick

Career history
- New York Giants (1995–1998)

Career NFL statistics
- Tackles: 6
- Stats at Pro Football Reference

Rodney Menard Young (born January 25, 1973) is an American former professional football player who was a defensive back for four seasons with the New York Giants of the National Football League (NFL) from 1995 to 1998. He was the 85th player taken in the 1995 NFL draft. A native of Grambling, Louisiana, Young was a 1990 USA Today All-American for Ruston High School under Coach Jimmy Childress. He played college football at Louisiana State University. He is the son of 10-year NFL player, Willie Young.
