= 1944 United States presidential election in Louisiana =

- November 7, 1944

Nominee	Franklin D. Roosevelt	Thomas E. Dewey
Party	Democratic	Republican
Home state	New York	New York
Running mate	Harry Truman	John Bricker
Electoral vote	10	0
Popular vote	281,564	67,750
Percentage	80.59%	19.39%
Parish results
Roosevelt
60–70%
70–80%
80–90%
90–100%
President before election
Franklin D. Roosevelt
Democratic
Elected President
Franklin D. Roosevelt
Democratic

The 1944 United States presidential election in Louisiana took place on November 7, 1944, as part of the 1944 United States presidential election. State voters chose ten representatives, or electors, to the Electoral College, who voted for president and vice president.

Ever since the passage of a new constitution in 1898, Louisiana had been a one-party state dominated by the Democratic Party. The Republican Party became moribund due to the disenfranchisement of blacks and the complete absence of other support bases as Louisiana completely lacked upland or German refugee whites opposed to secession. Despite this absolute single-party dominance, non-partisan tendencies remained strong among wealthy sugar planters in Acadiana and within the business elite of New Orleans.

Until the rise of Huey P. Long, post-disenfranchisement Louisiana politics was dominated by the New Orleans–based "Choctaw Club", which overcame Socialist, Wobbly, and Progressive challenges from the outlying upcountry, Imperial Calcasieu and Acadiana regions between the late 1900s and early 1920s. The three presidential elections between 1916 and 1924 saw a rebellion in Acadiana over sugar tariffs and Woodrow Wilson's foreign and domestic policies; however, the nomination of Catholic Al Smith in 1928 rapidly restored their Democratic loyalty without causing significant upheaval in the remainder of the state, which was too focused on control of black labour to worry about Smith's Catholicism.

Following the 1928 gubernatorial primary, Louisiana politics until Brown v. Board of Education would be governed by a system of coherent "Long" and "anti-Long" Democratic factionalism, as the administration of Huey Long introduced significant economic reforms, which were strongly opposed by the remnants of the old Choctaws. During the first term of Roosevelt, Long sought to capture the Presidency for himself under a "Share-Our-Wealth" program involving the confiscation of wealthy fortunes, family allowances, and government storage of agricultural surpluses. The Long and anti-Long factions would compete intensely in subsequent primaries, with many controversies, most critically involving New Orleans election officer Patrick Classic's attempt to count ninety-seven ballots for anti-Long Hale Boggs in a House of Representatives primary in September 1940, which reached the Supreme Court and established the right to regulate primary elections. Three years later, Louisiana's lily-white one-party politics was shaken by Smith v. Allwright, which ruled white-only primaries as unconstitutional, and to which Governor Sam Jones responded saying:

We've always handled that question [black disenfranchisement]—and always will.

== Results ==
1944 United States presidential election in Louisiana
Party	Candidate	Votes	%
Democratic	Franklin D. Roosevelt (inc.)	281,564	80.59%
Republican	Thomas Dewey	67,750	19.39%
Write-ins	—	69	0.02%
Total votes		349,383	100%

=== Results by parish ===
Parish	Franklin D. Roosevelt Democratic		Thomas E. Dewey Republican		Various candidates Write-ins		Margin		Total votes cast
Parish	#	%	#	%	#	%	#	%	Total votes cast
Acadia	4,439	81.27%	1,023	18.73%			3,416	62.54%	5,462
Allen	2,205	86.78%	336	13.22%			1,869	73.55%	2,541
Ascension	2,291	86.29%	364	13.71%			1,927	72.58%	2,655
Assumption	1,419	76.91%	426	23.09%			993	53.82%	1,845
Avoyelles	3,789	92.53%	306	7.47%			3,483	85.05%	4,095
Beauregard	2,226	74.57%	759	25.43%			1,467	49.15%	2,985
Bienville	1,801	71.87%	705	28.13%			1,096	43.74%	2,506
Bossier	2,430	79.59%	622	20.37%	1	0.03%	1,808	59.22%	3,053
Caddo	12,896	68.56%	5,885	31.29%	29	0.15%	7,011	37.27%	18,810
Calcasieu	7,861	80.81%	1,867	19.19%			5,994	61.62%	9,728
Caldwell	1,142	69.34%	505	30.66%			637	38.68%	1,647
Cameron	1,025	92.26%	86	7.74%			939	84.52%	1,111
Catahoula	1,208	80.59%	291	19.41%			917	61.17%	1,499
Claiborne	2,266	79.68%	578	20.32%			1,688	59.35%	2,844
Concordia	974	82.89%	201	17.11%			773	65.79%	1,175
DeSoto	1,858	77.55%	538	22.45%			1,320	55.09%	2,396
East Baton Rouge	14,757	82.99%	3,025	17.01%			11,732	65.98%	17,782
East Carroll	925	72.15%	357	27.85%			568	44.31%	1,282
East Feliciana	869	79.80%	220	20.20%			649	59.60%	1,089
Evangeline	3,029	91.68%	275	8.32%			2,754	83.35%	3,304
Franklin	2,476	80.57%	597	19.43%			1,879	61.15%	3,073
Grant	1,939	77.72%	556	22.28%			1,383	55.43%	2,495
Iberia	3,661	76.24%	1,141	23.76%			2,520	52.48%	4,802
Iberville	2,265	83.98%	432	16.02%			1,833	67.96%	2,697
Jackson	1,840	81.52%	414	18.34%	3	0.13%	1,426	63.18%	2,257
Jefferson	10,268	85.21%	1,782	14.79%			8,486	70.42%	12,050
Jefferson Davis	2,329	66.83%	1,156	33.17%			1,173	33.66%	3,485
Lafayette	4,801	86.61%	742	13.39%			4,059	73.23%	5,543
Lafourche	4,980	85.06%	875	14.94%			4,105	70.11%	5,855
LaSalle	2,018	79.20%	504	19.78%	26	1.02%	1,514	59.42%	2,548
Lincoln	1,705	62.29%	1,032	37.71%			673	24.59%	2,737
Livingston	2,460	87.76%	343	12.24%			2,117	75.53%	2,803
Madison	764	69.33%	338	30.67%			426	38.66%	1,102
Morehouse	1,859	79.55%	478	20.45%			1,381	59.09%	2,337
Natchitoches	2,536	69.59%	1,105	30.32%	3	0.08%	1,431	39.27%	3,644
Orleans	90,411	81.74%	20,190	18.25%	7	0.01%	70,221	63.49%	110,608
Ouachita	6,329	70.67%	2,627	29.33%			3,702	41.34%	8,956
Plaquemines	1,755	83.97%	335	16.03%			1,420	67.94%	2,090
Pointe Coupee	1,436	84.12%	271	15.88%			1,165	68.25%	1,707
Rapides	9,132	84.21%	1,712	15.79%			7,420	68.42%	10,844
Red River	975	70.45%	409	29.55%			566	40.90%	1,384
Richland	2,087	81.05%	488	18.95%			1,599	62.10%	2,575
Sabine	2,048	66.34%	1,039	33.66%			1,009	32.69%	3,087
St. Bernard	2,044	96.23%	80	3.77%			1,964	92.47%	2,124
St. Charles	1,945	91.79%	174	8.21%			1,771	83.58%	2,119
St. Helena	683	86.35%	108	13.65%			575	72.69%	791
St. James	1,387	83.96%	265	16.04%			1,122	67.92%	1,652
St. John the Baptist	1,324	87.16%	195	12.84%			1,129	74.33%	1,519
St. Landry	4,423	84.94%	784	15.06%			3,639	69.89%	5,207
St. Martin	2,384	93.97%	153	6.03%			2,231	87.94%	2,537
St. Mary	3,591	86.97%	538	13.03%			3,053	73.94%	4,129
St. Tammany	3,450	83.07%	703	16.93%			2,747	66.14%	4,153
Tangipahoa	4,419	73.76%	1,572	26.24%			2,847	47.52%	5,991
Tensas	638	79.95%	160	20.05%			478	59.90%	798
Terrebonne	3,539	86.55%	550	13.45%			2,989	73.10%	4,089
Union	1,765	68.73%	803	31.27%			962	37.46%	2,568
Vermilion	4,684	87.39%	676	12.61%			4,008	74.78%	5,360
Vernon	3,075	75.05%	1,022	24.95%			2,053	50.11%	4,097
Washington	4,810	92.22%	406	7.78%			4,404	84.43%	5,216
Webster	3,655	80.26%	899	19.74%			2,756	60.52%	4,554
West Baton Rouge	1,045	92.31%	87	7.69%			958	84.63%	1,132
West Carroll	1,390	70.52%	581	29.48%			809	41.05%	1,971
West Feliciana	426	70.53%	178	29.47%			248	41.06%	604
Winn	1,403	61.43%	881	38.57%			522	22.85%	2,284
Totals	281,564	80.59%	67,750	19.39%	69	0.02%	213,814	61.20%	349,383

== Analysis ==
Incumbent Democratic President Franklin D. Roosevelt carried Louisiana in a landslide, defeating Republican New York Governor Thomas E. Dewey by a margin of 61.20 points, and sweeping every parish in the state. Nevertheless, indications of protest against Roosevelt's policies were seen in the rural hill parishes where the Long dynasty had been strongest in the preceding fifteen years—for instance in Long's ancestral home of Winn Parish, Dewey won almost two-fifths of the vote, and in Winn and nearby Lincoln Parish, the Democratic vote share fell by almost one quarter from the 1940 election.

As of 2024, this election marks the last time that a Democratic presidential nominee has carried Bossier Parish. Plaquemines Parish and Lincoln Parish have both voted for a Democratic presidential candidate only once since—for Bill Clinton in 1996—whilst Caddo Parish and Claiborne Parish would not vote Democratic again until Clinton in 1992. It also marked the end of a 64-year Democratic voting streak; four years later, the state would back Dixiecrat candidate Strom Thurmond instead of Democratic nominee Harry S. Truman. As such, this marks the last time that any presidential candidate would carry every parish in the state.

== See also ==
- United States presidential elections in Louisiana
