= Louisiana Highway 817 =

State highway in Louisiana, United States

Louisiana Highway 817

Route information
- Maintained by Louisiana DOTD
- Existed: 1955 renumbering–present

Location
- Country: United States
- State: Louisiana
- Parishes: Lincoln

Highway system
- Louisiana State Highway System; Interstate; US; State; Scenic
← LA 816	→ LA 818

Louisiana Highway 817 (LA 817) is a collection of one current and two former state-maintained streets in the Lincoln Parish village of Simsboro. All three routes were established in the 1955 Louisiana Highway renumbering.

== Louisiana Highway 817-1 ==
Louisiana Highway 817-1
- Location: Simsboro
- Length: 0.507 mi (816 m)
- Existed: 1955–c. 1957

Louisiana Highway 817-1 (LA 817-1) ran 0.51 miles (0.82 km) in a north–south direction from the junction of US 80 and LA 507 to a junction with a local road. It was an undivided two-lane highway for its entire length. Most of the route is now part of LA 507, which was extended northward to connect with I-20.

The entire highway was in Simsboro, Lincoln Parish.

mi	km	Destinations	Notes
0.000	0.000	US 80 – Ruston, Arcadia; LA 507 – Bienville	Southern terminus of LA 817-1; northern terminus of LA 507
0.507	0.816	End state maintenance	Northern terminus
1.000 mi = 1.609 km; 1.000 km = 0.621 mi

== Louisiana Highway 817-2 ==
Louisiana Highway 817-2
- Location: Simsboro
- Length: 0.356 mi (573 m)
- Existed: 1955–2008

Louisiana Highway 817-2 (LA 817-2) ran 0.36 miles (0.58 km) in a loop off of US 80 around Simsboro High School. It was an undivided two-lane highway for its entire length. The route was returned to local control in 2008.

The entire highway was in Simsboro, Lincoln Parish.

mi	km	Destinations	Notes
0.000	0.000	US 80 – Ruston, Arcadia	Western terminus
0.356	0.573	US 80 – Ruston, Arcadia	Eastern terminus
1.000 mi = 1.609 km; 1.000 km = 0.621 mi

== Louisiana Highway 817-3 ==
Louisiana Highway 817-3
- Location: Simsboro
- Length: 0.096 mi (154 m)
- Existed: 1955–present

Louisiana Highway 817-3 (LA 817-3) runs 0.10 miles (0.16 km) in an east–west direction along 2nd Street from LA 507 to Tiger Drive, a local road, opposite Simsboro High School. It is an undivided two-lane highway for its entire length.

The entire highway is in Simsboro, Lincoln Parish.

mi	km	Destinations	Notes
0.000	0.000	LA 507 (Martha Street)	Western terminus
0.096	0.154	End state maintenance at junction of 2nd Street and Tiger Drive	Eastern terminus
1.000 mi = 1.609 km; 1.000 km = 0.621 mi
