= Lincoln Parish, Louisiana =

Parish in Louisiana, United States

Coordinates: 32.60°N 92.66°W

- Parish
- Parish of Lincoln; Paroisse de Lincoln (French)
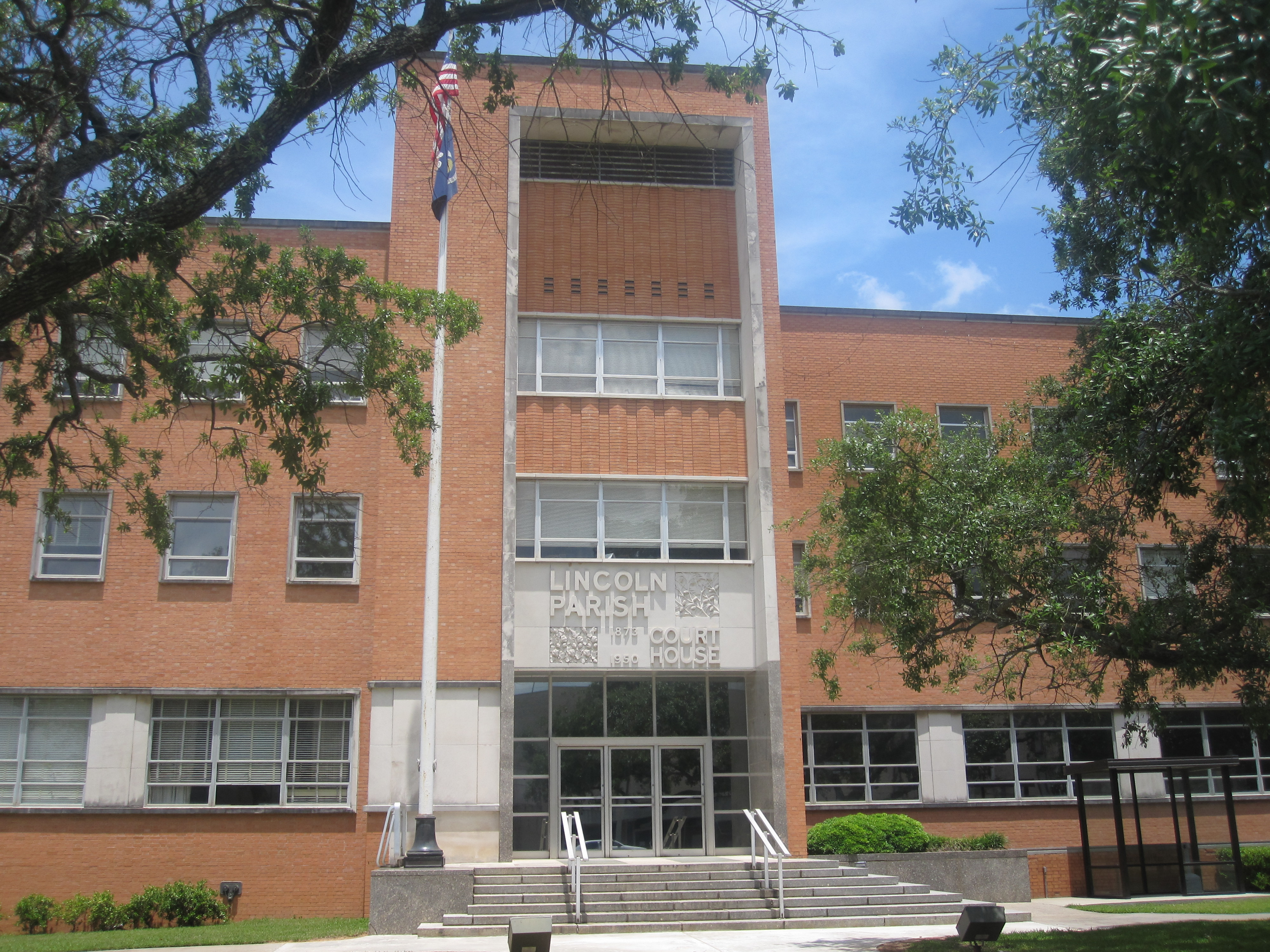
- Lincoln Parish Courthouse in Ruston

- Flag

- Location within the U.S. state of Louisiana

- Louisiana's location within the U.S.
- Country: United States
- State: Louisiana
- Region: North Louisiana
- Founded: 1873
- Named for: Abraham Lincoln
- Parish seat (and largest city): Ruston

Area
  - Total: 472 sq mi (1,220 km^{2})
  - Land: 472 sq mi (1,220 km^{2})
  - Water: 0.7 sq mi (1.8 km^{2})
  - percentage: 0.2 sq mi (0.52 km^{2})

Population (2020)
  - Total: 48,396
  - Estimate (2025): 48,360 ▼
  - Rank: LA: 25th
  - Density: 103/sq mi (39.6/km^{2})
- Time zone: UTC-6 (CST)
  - Summer (DST): UTC-5 (CDT)
- Area code: 318
- Congressional district: 5th
- Website: Parish of Lincoln

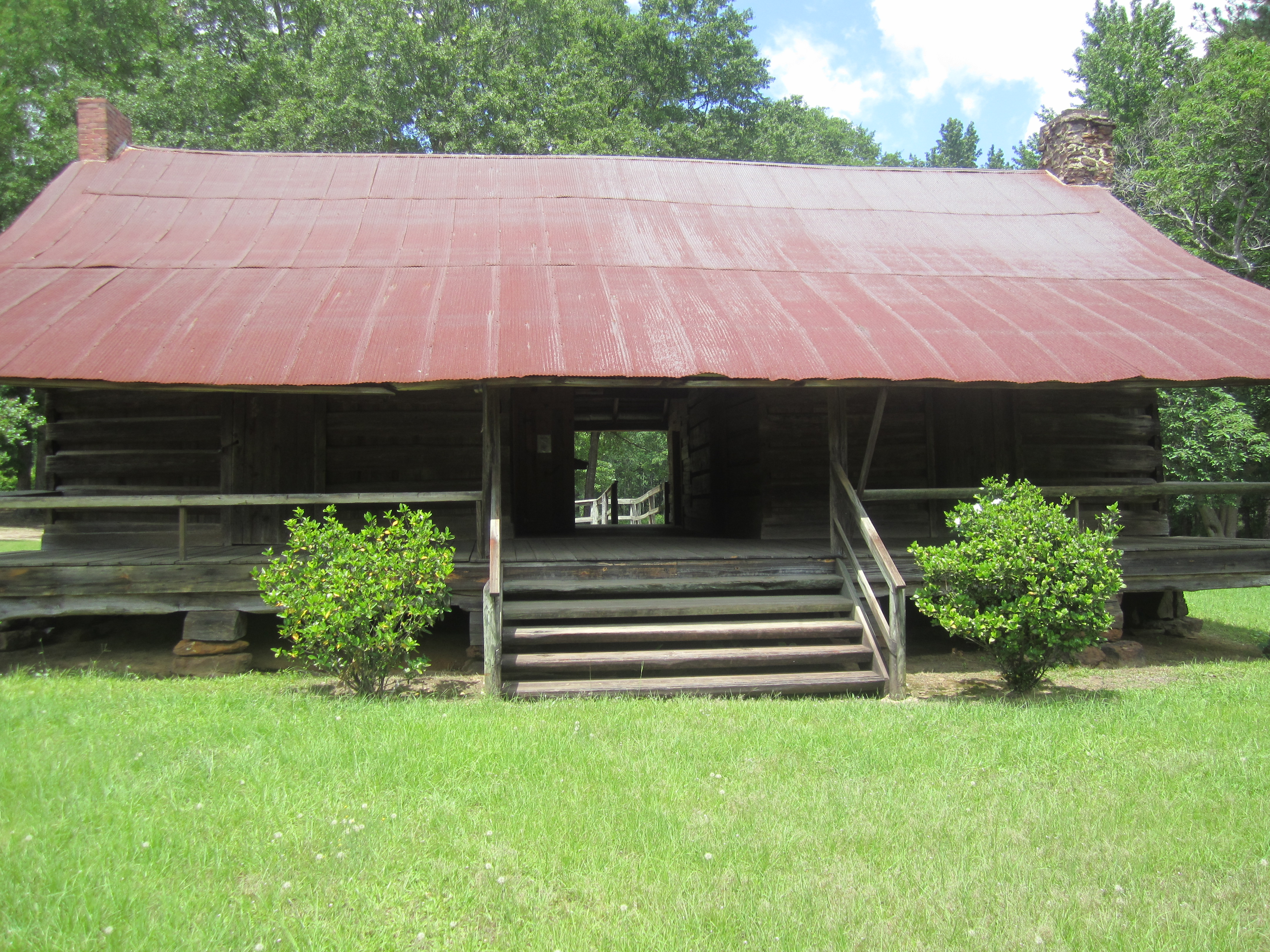
Autrey Dogtrot House, built in 1849 by Absalom and Elizabeth Norris Autrey, formerly of Selma, Alabama is located west of Dubach. The oldest restored dogtrot house in Lincoln Parish, it was listed in 1980 on the National Register of Historic Places.

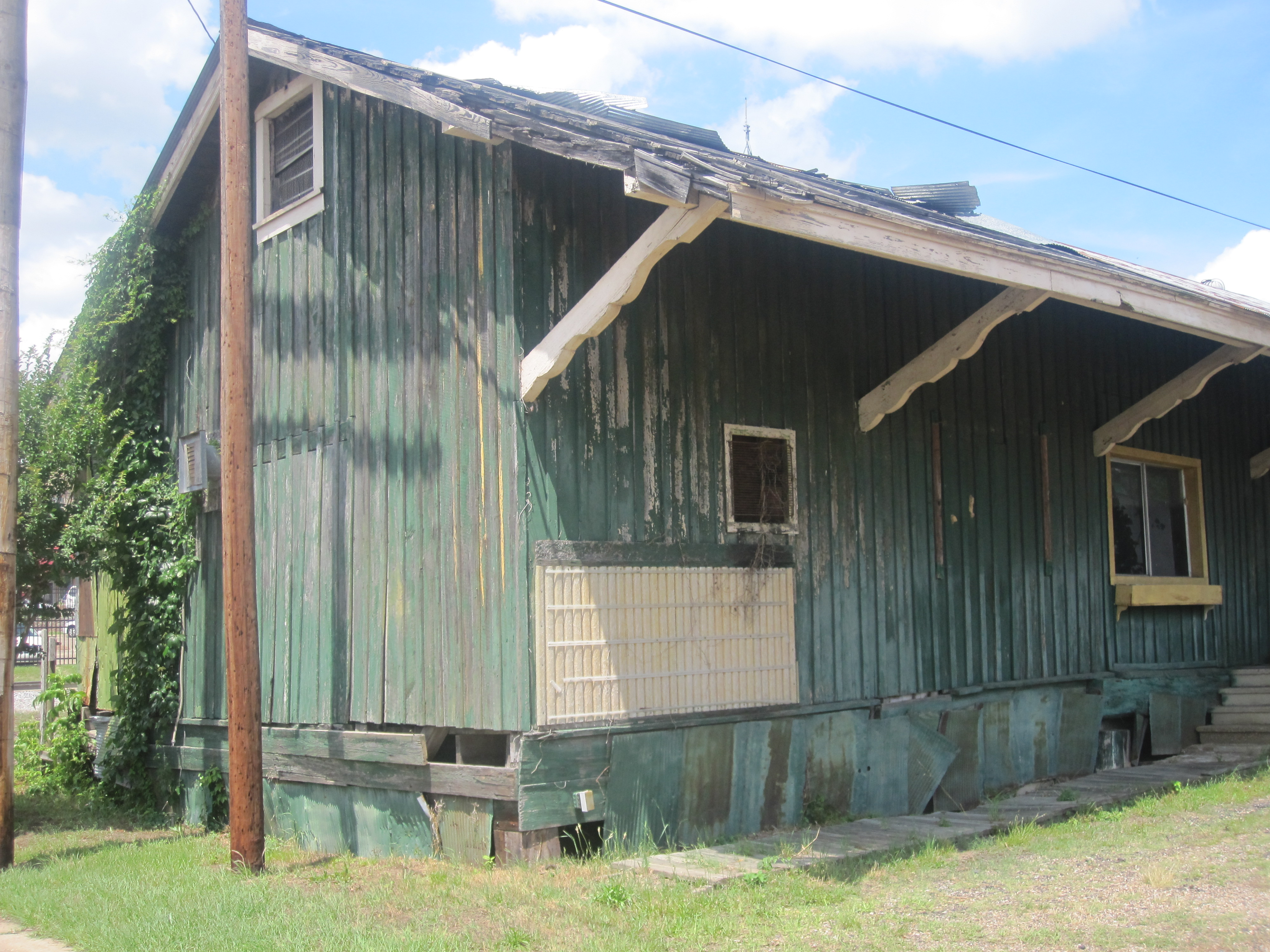
Historic Vicksburg, Shreveport, and Pacific Railroad depot in downtown Ruston; Robert Edwin Russ, the founder of Ruston, sold land to the railroad in 1883.

Lincoln Parish (French: Paroisse de Lincoln) is a parish located in the U.S. state of Louisiana. As of the 2020 census, the population was 48,396. The parish was created on February 24, 1873, from parts of Bienville, Claiborne, Union, and Jackson parishes, and its boundaries have changed only once (in 1877). This makes Lincoln Parish one of the Reconstruction parishes.

The parish seat was Vienna from the parish's creation in 1873 until 1884, when a parish-wide vote moved it to the new railroad town of Ruston.

Lincoln Parish comprises the Ruston micropolitan statistical area.

== History ==
Since the late 20th century, archeologists have dated 11 sites in northern Louisiana where thousands of years ago, indigenous cultures built complexes with multiple, monumental earthwork mounds during the Middle Archaic period, long before the development of sedentary, agricultural societies. At sites such as Watson Brake, Frenchman's Bend, and Caney, generations of hunter-gatherers worked for hundreds of years to build and add to mound complexes. Hedgepeth Site, located in Lincoln Parish, is dated about 5200–4500 BP (about 3300–2600 BCE), from the latter part of this period. Such finds are changing the understanding of early human cultures.

The parish was one of several new ones established by the state legislature during Reconstruction; in 1873 it was formed from land that had belonged to Bienville, Claiborne, Jackson and Union parishes to create one in which newly elected representatives might have more ties to the Republican Party. It was an attempt to break up the old order of political power, and to capitalize on the arrival of the railroad line. The parish is named for the late U.S. president Abraham Lincoln.

Lincoln Parish is usually Republican in contested elections. In 2012, Republican presidential nominee Mitt Romney won the parish with 10,739 votes (56.5 percent) to U.S. President Barack H. Obama, the Democrat who polled 7,956 ballots (41.9 percent).

== Geography ==
According to the U.S. Census Bureau, the parish has a total area of 472 square miles (1,220 km^{2}), of which 472 square miles (1,220 km^{2}) is land and 0.7 square miles (1.8 km^{2}) (0.2%) is water.

=== Major highways ===
- Interstate 20
- U.S. Highway 63
- U.S. Highway 80
- U.S. Highway 167
- Louisiana Highway 33
- Louisiana Highway 145
- Louisiana Highway 146
- Louisiana Highway 147
- Louisiana Highway 149
- Louisiana Highway 150
- Louisiana Highway 151
- Louisiana Highway 152
- Louisiana Highway 507
- Louisiana Highway 544
- Louisiana Highway 545
- Louisiana Highway 556
- Louisiana Highway 563
- Louisiana Highway 797
- Louisiana Highway 815
- Louisiana Highway 818
- Louisiana Highway 819-1
- Louisiana Highway 819-2
- Louisiana Highway 819-3
- Louisiana Highway 819-4
- Louisiana Highway 819-5
- Louisiana Highway 820
- Louisiana Highway 821
- Louisiana Highway 822
- Louisiana Highway 823
- Louisiana Highway 824-1
- Louisiana Highway 824-2
- Louisiana Highway 824-3
- Louisiana Highway 3005
- Louisiana Highway 3012
- Louisiana Highway 3061
- Louisiana Highway 3072
- Louisiana Highway 3074

=== Adjacent parishes ===
- Union Parish (north)
- Ouachita Parish (east)
- Jackson Parish (south)
- Bienville Parish (southwest)
- Claiborne Parish (northwest)

== Communities ==
=== Cities ===
- Grambling
- Ruston (parish seat and largest municipality)

=== Towns ===
- Dubach
- Vienna

=== Villages ===
- Choudrant
- Downsville
- Simsboro

=== Unincorporated communities ===
- Corinth
- Mount Zion
- Pleasant Hill
- Hico
- Hilly
- Unionville

== Demographics ==
Historical population
Census	Pop.	Note	%±
1880	11,075		—
1890	14,753		33.2%
1900	15,898		7.8%
1910	18,485		16.3%
1920	16,962		−8.2%
1930	22,822		34.5%
1940	24,790		8.6%
1950	25,782		4.0%
1960	28,535		10.7%
1970	33,800		18.5%
1980	39,763		17.6%
1990	41,745		5.0%
2000	42,509		1.8%
2010	46,735		9.9%
2020	48,396		3.6%
2025 (est.)	48,360	▼	−0.1%
U.S. Decennial Census; 1790-1960 1900-1990; 1990-2000 2010

=== 2020 census ===
As of the 2020 census, the parish had a population of 48,396. The median age was 29.9 years. 20.1% of residents were under the age of 18 and 14.2% of residents were 65 years of age or older. For every 100 females there were 92.4 males, and for every 100 females age 18 and over there were 89.7 males age 18 and over.

The racial makeup of the parish was 53.8% White, 38.7% Black or African American, 0.4% American Indian and Alaska Native, 1.4% Asian, <0.1% Native Hawaiian and Pacific Islander, 1.7% from some other race, and 4.0% from two or more races. Hispanic or Latino residents of any race comprised 3.6% of the population.

59.6% of residents lived in urban areas, while 40.4% lived in rural areas.

There were 18,075 households in the parish, of which 29.3% had children under the age of 18 living in them. Of all households, 37.7% were married-couple households, 21.6% were households with a male householder and no spouse or partner present, and 35.1% were households with a female householder and no spouse or partner present. About 30.1% of all households were made up of individuals and 10.4% had someone living alone who was 65 years of age or older.

There were 20,370 housing units, of which 11.3% were vacant. Among occupied housing units, 55.4% were owner-occupied and 44.6% were renter-occupied. The homeowner vacancy rate was 1.6% and the rental vacancy rate was 10.4%.

=== Racial and ethnic composition ===
Lincoln Parish, Louisiana – Racial and ethnic composition Note: the US Census treats Hispanic/Latino as an ethnic category. This table excludes Latinos from the racial categories and assigns them to a separate category. Hispanics/Latinos may be of any race.
Race / Ethnicity (NH = Non-Hispanic)	Pop 1980	Pop 1990	Pop 2000	Pop 2010	Pop 2020	% 1980	% 1990	% 2000	% 2010	% 2020
White alone (NH)	24,453	24,425	24,206	25,313	25,672	61.50%	58.51%	56.94%	54.16%	53.05%
Black or African American alone (NH)	14,460	16,546	16,846	18,860	18,626	36.37%	39.64%	39.63%	40.36%	38.49%
Native American or Alaska Native alone (NH)	36	39	72	109	145	0.09%	0.09%	0.17%	0.23%	0.30%
Asian alone (NH)	173	330	538	786	682	0.44%	0.79%	1.27%	1.68%	1.41%
Native Hawaiian or Pacific Islander alone (NH)	x	x	6	17	5	x	x	0.01%	0.04%	0.01%
Other race alone (NH)	197	24	52	33	106	0.50%	0.06%	0.12%	0.07%	0.22%
Mixed race or Multiracial (NH)	x	x	297	428	1,406	x	x	0.70%	0.92%	2.91%
Hispanic or Latino (any race)	444	381	492	1,189	1,754	1.12%	0.91%	1.16%	2.54%	3.62%
Total	39,763	41,745	42,509	46,735	48,396	100.00%	100.00%	100.00%	100.00%	100.00%

== Education ==
Lincoln Parish residents are zoned to Lincoln Parish School Board schools.

The parish is home to Louisiana Tech University in Ruston, and Grambling State University in Grambling.

Bethel Christian School is located in Ruston.

Ruston High School is located in Ruston.

Lincoln Preparatory School is located in Grambling.

Choudrant Elementary School and Choudrant High School are located in Choudrant.

Cedar Creek (K - 12) is located in Ruston

== National Guard ==
527th Engineer Battalion (Triple Alpha) ("Anything, Anytime, Anywhere") is headquartered in Ruston, Louisiana, the parish seat. This battalion is part of the 225th Engineer Brigade of the Louisiana National Guard.

== Attractions ==
- Eddie G. Robinson Museum
- Lincoln Parish Park
- Louisiana Military Museum
- Lincoln Parish Museum
- Dixie Center for the Arts
- North Central Louisiana Arts Council
- Ruston Community Theatre
- Celebrity Theatre (movie theater)
- Annual Peach Festival held in Ruston
- Annual Chicken Festival held in Dubach
- Kingdom Collectives Film Festival held in Ruston

== Politics ==
United States presidential election results for Lincoln Parish, Louisiana
Year	Republican		Democratic		Third party(ies)	
Year	No.	%	No.	%	No.	%
1912	3	0.39%	644	84.51%	115	15.09%
1916	42	4.29%	932	95.30%	4	0.41%
1920	183	15.61%	989	84.39%	0	0.00%
1924	157	13.46%	1,005	86.19%	4	0.34%
1928	670	39.16%	1,041	60.84%	0	0.00%
1932	163	7.87%	1,908	92.13%	0	0.00%
1936	201	8.53%	2,154	91.43%	1	0.04%
1940	449	13.14%	2,969	86.86%	0	0.00%
1944	1,032	37.71%	1,705	62.29%	0	0.00%
1948	353	11.03%	625	19.53%	2,223	69.45%
1952	3,074	60.48%	2,009	39.52%	0	0.00%
1956	2,676	59.20%	1,014	22.43%	830	18.36%
1960	2,766	54.14%	1,051	20.57%	1,292	25.29%
1964	5,766	77.09%	1,714	22.91%	0	0.00%
1968	2,643	29.77%	2,009	22.63%	4,225	47.59%
1972	6,736	69.15%	2,589	26.58%	416	4.27%
1976	6,828	57.05%	4,971	41.53%	170	1.42%
1980	7,515	55.79%	5,598	41.56%	357	2.65%
1984	9,087	61.81%	5,432	36.95%	182	1.24%
1988	8,853	60.40%	5,427	37.03%	377	2.57%
1992	7,220	43.60%	7,205	43.51%	2,136	12.90%
1996	6,973	43.98%	7,903	49.85%	979	6.17%
2000	9,246	55.86%	6,851	41.39%	454	2.74%
2004	10,791	59.23%	7,242	39.75%	185	1.02%
2008	10,680	55.69%	8,292	43.23%	207	1.08%
2012	10,739	56.54%	7,956	41.89%	298	1.57%
2016	10,761	57.64%	7,107	38.07%	801	4.29%
2020	11,311	58.68%	7,559	39.22%	405	2.10%
2024	11,248	61.95%	6,627	36.50%	282	1.55%

== See also ==
- National Register of Historic Places listings in Lincoln Parish, Louisiana
