= Choudrant, Louisiana =

- Village
- Village of Choudrant
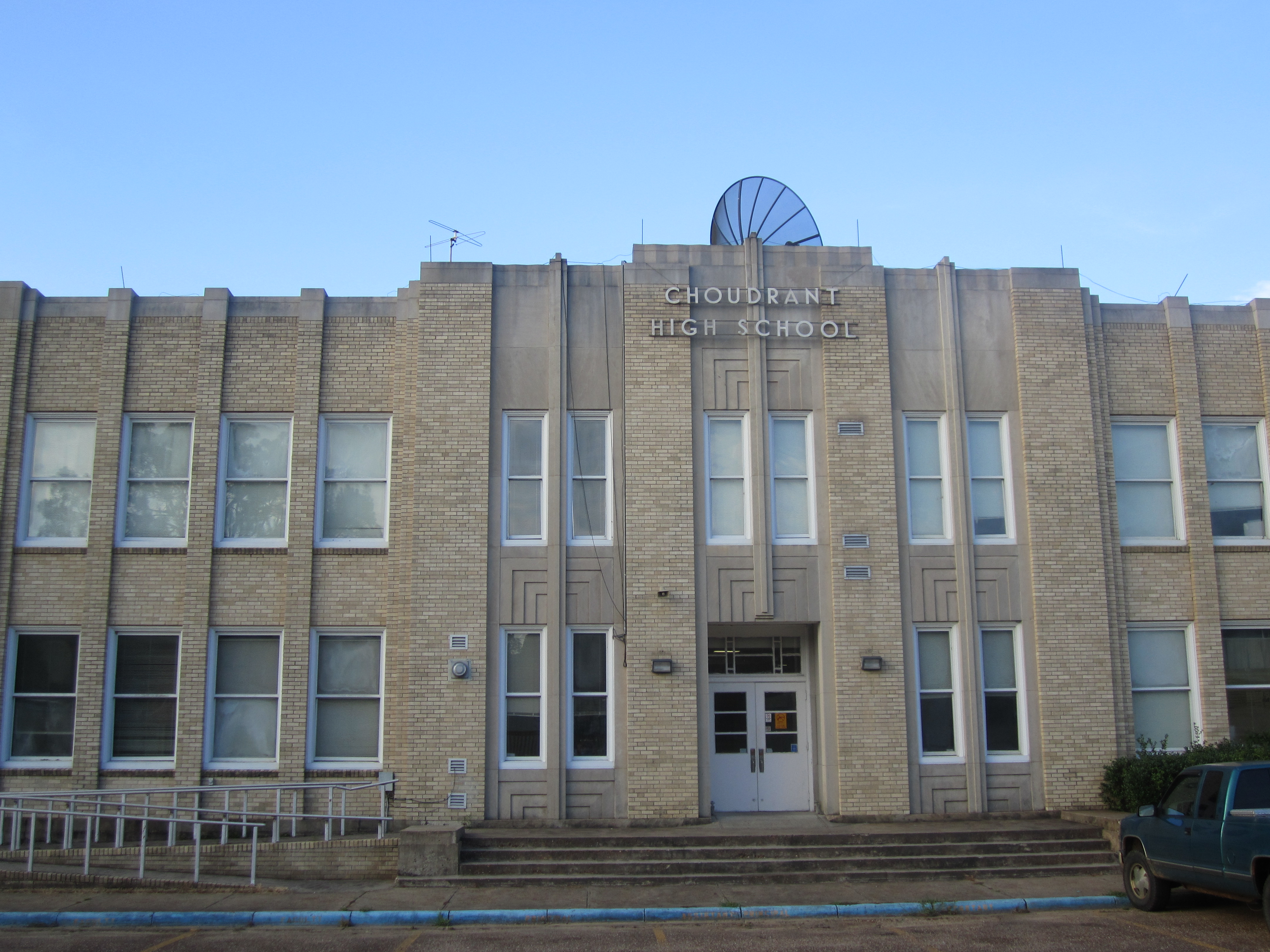
- Choudrant High School
- Motto: Louisiana's Front Porch"
- Location of Choudrant in Lincoln Parish, Louisiana.

- Location of Louisiana in the United States
- Coordinates: 32°33′10″N 92°30′22″W
- Country: United States
- State: Louisiana
- Parish: Lincoln

Area
  - Total: 4.28 sq mi (11.09 km^{2})
  - Land: 4.23 sq mi (10.96 km^{2})
  - Water: 0.050 sq mi (0.13 km^{2})
- Elevation: 207 ft (63 m)

Population (2020)
  - Total: 989
  - Density: 233.7/sq mi (90.25/km^{2})
- Time zone: UTC-6 (CST)
  - Summer (DST): UTC-5 (CDT)
- ZIP code: 71227
- Area code: 318
- FIPS code: 22-15290
- GNIS feature ID: 2407431
- Website: Village of Choudrant, Louisiana

Choudrant is a village in Lincoln Parish, Louisiana, United States. As of the 2020 census, Choudrant had a population of 989. It is part of the Ruston Micropolitan Statistical Area.

== Geography ==
According to the United States Census Bureau, the village has a total area of 1.8 mi^{2} (4.7 km^{2}), all land.

== Demographics ==
Historical population
Census	Pop.	Note	%±
1920	393		—
1930	394		0.3%
1940	438		11.2%
1950	395		−9.8%
1960	465		17.7%
1970	555		19.4%
1980	809		45.8%
1990	557		−31.1%
2000	582		4.5%
2010	845		45.2%
2020	989		17.0%
2025 (est.)	1,032	▲	4.3%
U.S. Decennial Census

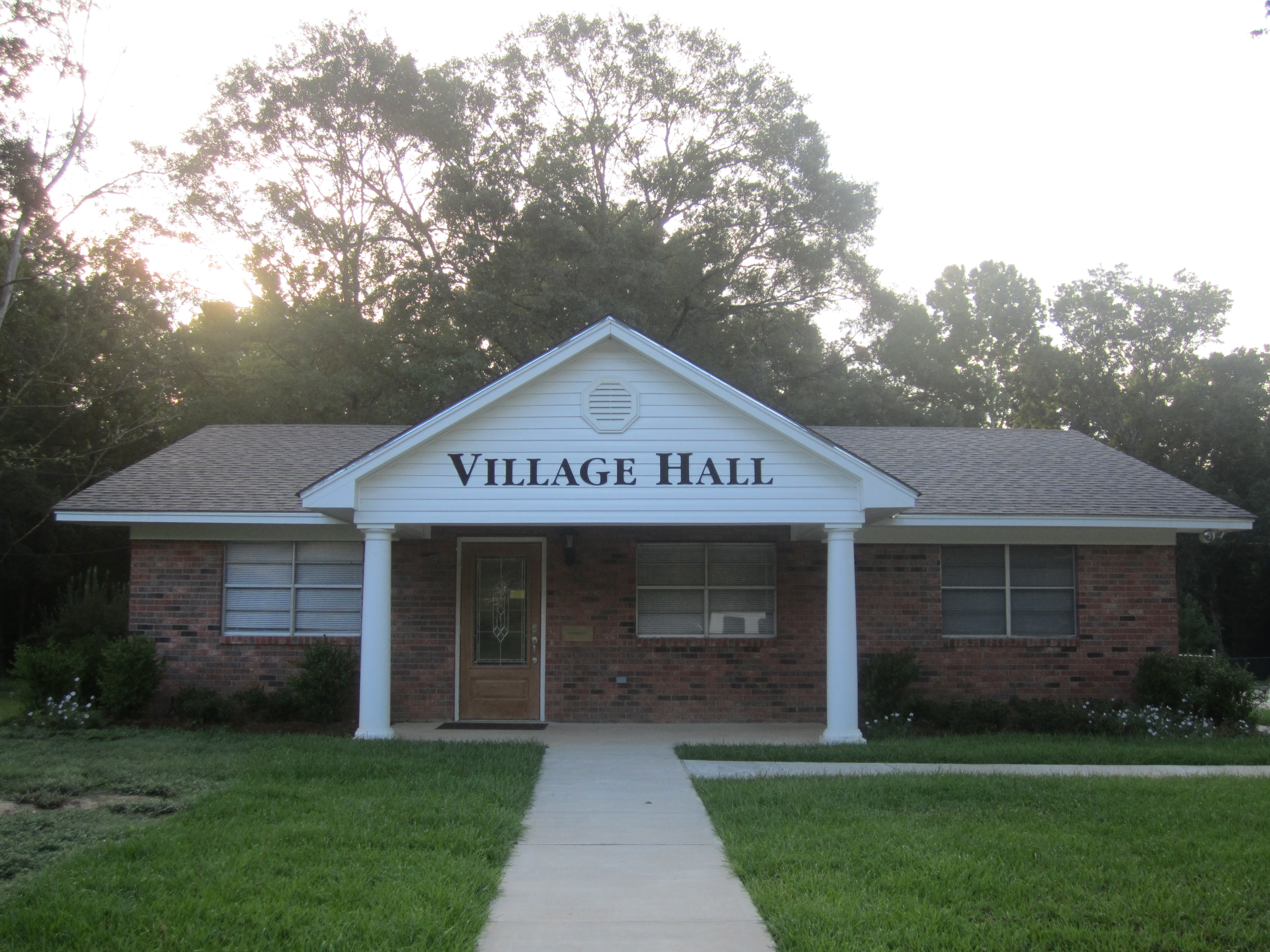
Choudrant Village Hall

=== 2020 census ===
Choudrant racial composition
Race	Number	Percentage
White (non-Hispanic)	842	85.14%
Black or African American (non-Hispanic)	61	6.17%
Asian	7	0.71%
Other/Mixed	50	5.06%
Hispanic or Latino	29	2.93%

As of the 2020 United States census, there were 989 people, 382 households, and 293 families residing in the village.

=== 2000 census ===
As of the census of 2000, there were 582 people, 234 households, and 167 families residing in the village. The population density was 318.9 inhabitants per square mile (123.1/km^{2}). There were 257 housing units at an average density of 140.8 per square mile (54.4/km^{2}). The racial makeup of the village was 91.92% White, 6.53% African American, 0.17% Native American, 1.03% from other races, and 0.34% from two or more races. Hispanic or Latino of any race were 1.20% of the population.

There were 234 households, out of which 35.5% had children under the age of 18 living with them, 56.4% were married couples living together, 11.5% had a female householder with no husband present, and 28.6% were non-families. 24.8% of all households were made up of individuals, and 8.1% had someone living alone who was 65 years of age or older. The average household size was 2.49 and the average family size was 2.98.

In the village, the population was spread out, with 25.1% under the age of 18, 10.0% from 18 to 24, 32.3% from 25 to 44, 19.8% from 45 to 64, and 12.9% who were 65 years of age or older. The median age was 35 years. For every 100 females, there were 99.3 males. For every 100 females age 18 and over, there were 99.1 males.

The median income for a household in the village was $37,321, and the median income for a family was $42,656. Males had a median income of $30,855 versus $25,000 for females. The per capita income for the village was $15,726. About 4.0% of families and 6.6% of the population were below the poverty line, including 6.5% of those under the age of 18 and 10.0% of those 65 and older.

== Economy ==
As a village, Choudrant has limited business opportunity. There are several "home grown" businesses within the village limits. The most prominent of local businesses is Origin Bank, founded as the Bank of Choudrant. It has since grown to become one of the largest banks in both Lincoln Parish and the neighboring Ouachita Parish. Despite its growth though, the FDIC still recognizes the original Choudrant branch as its home office. Origin Bank also sponsored the Louisiana Peach Festival in Ruston until 2005, when sponsorship was taken up by Squire Creek Country Club.

== Government ==
Chourraut is served by four elected officials—a mayor and three village aldermen. Other public employees include a town clerk and a small police force. For many years, Choudrant was served by only one law enforcement officer, its police chief, but the force has grown in recent years adding additional officers and a canine unit. The Lincoln Parish Sheriff's Office also provides law enforcement services as needed.

Fire protection in the Village is provided by the Choudrant Volunteer Fire Department.

== Education ==
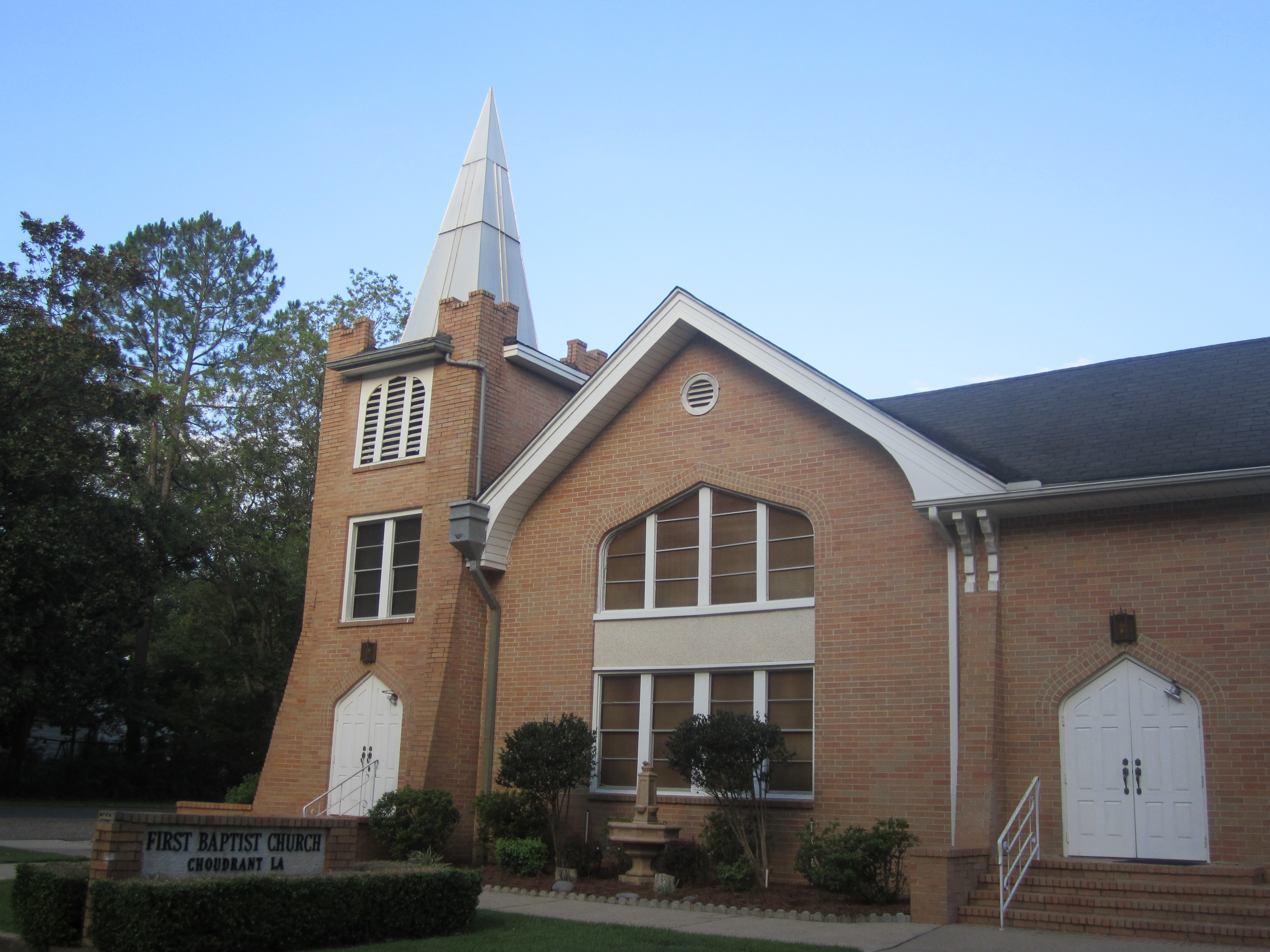
First Baptist Church of Choudrant

Choudrant is located within the fifth district of the Lincoln Parish School System. There are two schools within the Choudrant district—Choudrant Elementary and Choudrant High. The elementary school services between 400 and 450 students in grades K-6 while the high school contains approximately 350 students in grade levels 7–12. Both schools are well known as having high academic achievement under the state's school improvement plan and No Child Left Behind Act. The high school was rebuilt in 1937 after a fire and has had no substantive renovations or updates since that time. Choudrant Elementary was similarly rebuilt and expanded after a fire in the 1970s, but the student population had outgrown its walls. However, attempts to renovate the high school and rebuild the elementary school were halted in 2007 when citizens of the school district voted by a 2–1 majority against passage of a bond issue to fund such changes. The Tax later passed a couple years later. Since then the high school has been rebuilt and added an entire new wing, a new ag center and a new track.

== Notable people ==
- Bill Bagwell, baseball player
- Sam Burns, Professional Golfer
