= Louisiana =

U.S. state

Louisiana Louisiane (French) Luisiana (Spanish) Lwizyàn (Louisiana Creole)
- State
- Flag Seal
- Nicknames: Pelican State (official); Bayou State; Creole State; Sportsman's Paradise; The Boot
- Motto(s): Unio, Iustitia, Confidentia (English: "Union, Justice, Confidence")
- Anthem: "You Are My Sunshine"; State march song: "You Are My Sunshine"; Environmental song: "Gifts of the Earth"
- Location of Louisiana within the United States
- Country: United States
- Before statehood: Territory of Orleans and Louisiana Purchase
- Admitted to the Union: April 30, 1812; 214 years ago (18th)
- Capital: Baton Rouge
- Largest city: New Orleans
- Largest county or equivalent: East Baton Rouge Parish
- Largest metro and urban areas: Greater New Orleans

Government
  - Governor: Jeff Landry (R)
  - Lieutenant Governor: Billy Nungesser (R)
- Legislature: Legislature
  - Upper house: Senate
  - Lower house: House of Representatives
- Judiciary: Louisiana Supreme Court
- U.S. senators: Bill Cassidy (R); John Kennedy (R)
- U.S. House delegation: 4 Republicans; 2 Democrats (list)

Area
  - Total: 52,271 sq mi (135,382 km^{2})
  - Land: 43,204 sq mi (111,898 km^{2})
  - Water: 8,920 sq mi (23,102 km^{2}) 15%
  - Rank: 31st

Dimensions
  - Length: 380 mi (610 km)
  - Width: 144 mi (231 km)
- Elevation: 98 ft (30 m)
- Highest elevation (Driskill Mountain (Note: Elevation adjusted to North American Vertical Datum of 1988)): 535 ft (163 m)
- Lowest elevation (New Orleans): −8.2 ft (−2.5 m)

Population (2025)
  - Total: ▼4,618,189
  - Rank: 25th
  - Density: 107/sq mi (41.3/km^{2})
  - Rank: 26th
  - Median household income: $58,200 (2023)
  - Income rank: 48th
- Demonyms: Louisianian; Louisianais (Cajun or Creole heritage)

Language
  - Official language: None constitutionally specified; Louisiana French (special status under CODOFIL)
  - Spoken language: As of 2010: English 91.26%; French 3.45% (incl. Cajun and Creole); Spanish 3.30%
- Time zone: UTC−06:00 (CST)
  - Summer (DST): UTC−05:00 (CDT)
- USPS abbreviation: LA
- ISO 3166 code: US-LA
- Traditional abbreviation: La.
- Latitude: 28° 56′ N to 33° 01′ N
- Longitude: 88° 49′ W to 94° 03′ W
- Website: louisiana.gov

State symbols of Louisiana
List of state symbols
- Flag of Louisiana

- Seal of Louisiana

Living insignia
- Bird: Brown pelican
- Crustacean: Crawfish
- Dog breed: Catahoula Leopard Dog
- Fish: Crappie
- Flower: Magnolia
- Insect: Honeybee
- Mammal: Black bear
- Reptile: Alligator
- Tree: Bald cypress

Inanimate insignia
- Beverage: Milk
- Fossil: Petrified palmwood
- Gemstone: Agate
- Instrument: Diatonic accordion

State route marker

State quarter
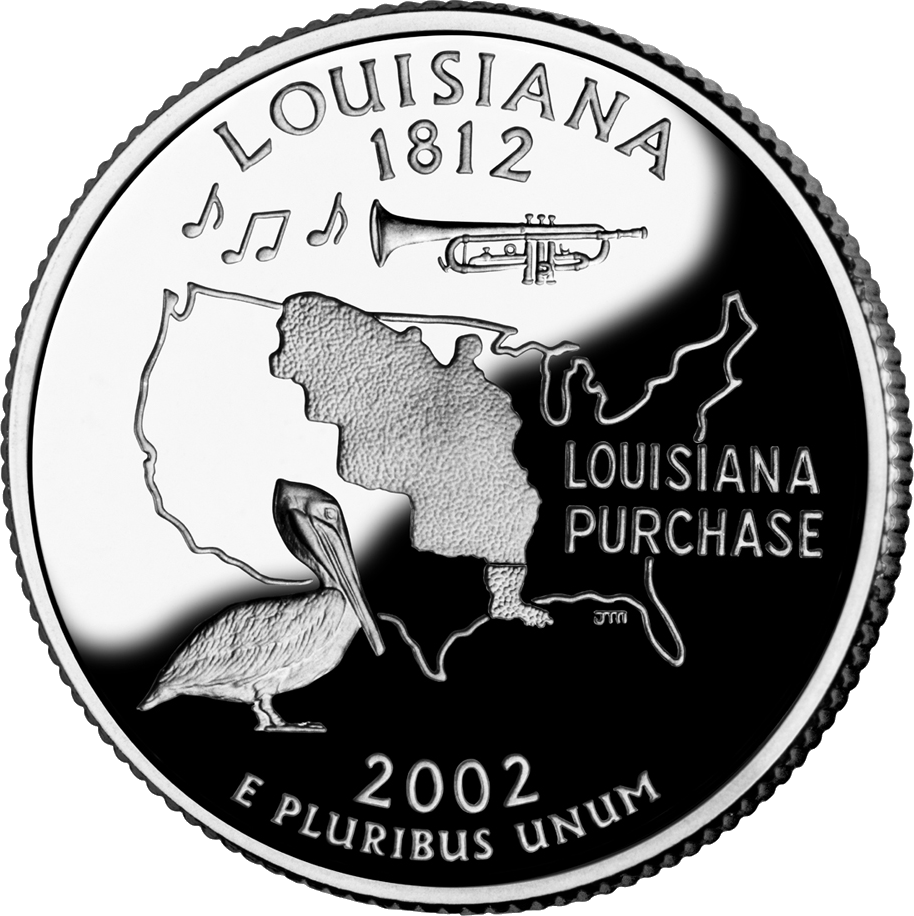
- Released in 2002

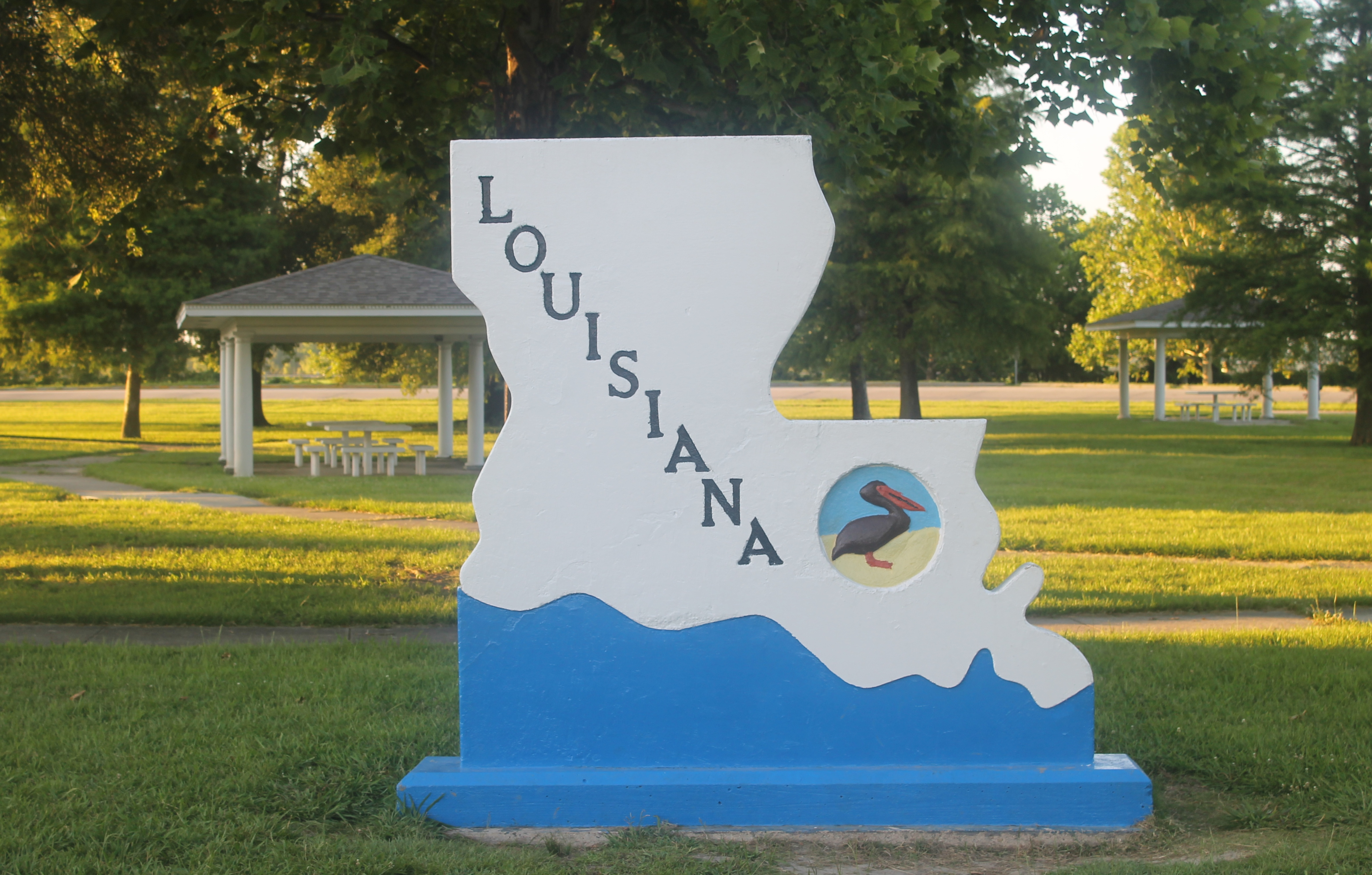
Louisiana entrance sign off Interstate 20 in Madison Parish east of Tallulah

Louisiana (Note: General American English: /luˌiːziˈænə/ loo-EE-zee-AN-ə; Southern American English: /ˌluːziˈænə/ LOO-zee-AN-ə) (French: Louisiane; Spanish: Luisiana [lwiˈsjana]; Louisiana Creole: Lwizyàn) (Note: Also spelt Lwizyann or Lalwizyann) is a state in the Deep South and South Central regions of the United States. It is bordered by Texas to the west, Arkansas to the north, and Mississippi to the east. Of the 50 U.S. states, it ranks 31st in area and 25th in population, with roughly 4.6 million residents. Reflecting its French heritage, Louisiana is the only U.S. state with political subdivisions termed parishes, which are equivalent to counties, making it one of only two U.S. states not subdivided into counties (the other being Alaska and its boroughs). Baton Rouge is the state's capital, and New Orleans, a French Louisiana region, is its most populous city with a population of about 363,000 people. Louisiana has a coastline with the Gulf of Mexico to the south; a large part of its eastern boundary is demarcated by the Mississippi River; and the mouth of the Mississippi or delta defines much of its lower topography.

Much of Louisiana's lands were formed from sediment washed down the Mississippi River, leaving enormous deltas and vast areas of coastal marsh and swamp. These contain a rich southern biota, including birds such as ibises and egrets, many species of tree frogs—such as the state-recognized American green tree frog—and fish such as sturgeon and paddlefish. More elevated areas, particularly in the north, contain a wide variety of ecosystems such as tallgrass prairie, longleaf pine forest and wet savannas; these support an exceptionally large number of plant species, including many species of terrestrial orchids and carnivorous plants. Over half the state is forested.

Louisiana is situated at the confluence of the Mississippi River System and the Gulf of Mexico. Its location and biodiversity attracted various indigenous groups thousands of years before Europeans arrived in the 17th century. Louisiana has eighteen Native American tribes—the most of any southern state—of which four are federally recognized and ten are state-recognized. The French claimed the territory in 1682, and it became the political, commercial, and population center of the larger colony of New France. From 1762 to 1801 Louisiana was under Spanish rule, briefly returning to French rule before being sold by Napoleon to the U.S. in 1803. It was admitted to the Union in 1812 as the 18th state. Following statehood, Louisiana saw an influx of settlers from the eastern U.S. as well as immigrants from the West Indies, Germany, and Ireland. It experienced an agricultural boom, particularly in cotton and sugarcane, which were cultivated primarily by slaves from Africa. As a slave state, Louisiana was one of the original seven members of the Confederate States of America during the American Civil War.

Louisiana's unique French heritage is reflected in its toponyms, dialects, culture, demographics, and legal system. Relative to the rest of the southern U.S., Louisiana is multilingual and multicultural, reflecting an admixture of Louisiana French (Cajun, Creole), Spanish, French Canadian, Acadian, Saint-Domingue Creole, Native American, and West African cultures (generally the descendants of slaves purchased in the 18th century); more recent migrants include Filipinos and Vietnamese. In the post–Civil War environment, Anglo-Americans increased the pressure for Anglicization, and in 1921, English was shortly made the sole language of instruction in Louisiana schools before a policy of multilingualism was revived in 1974. English in Louisiana has a wide variety of different sub-dialects, including Cajun English, New Orleans English and other variants of Southern American English. Dropping of postvocalic \r\ is common, especially in the southern half of the state. Louisiana has never had an official language, and the state constitution enumerates "the right of the people to preserve, foster, and promote their respective historic, linguistic, and cultural origins."

Based on national averages, Louisiana frequently ranks low among U.S. states in terms of health, education, and development, with high rates of poverty and homicide. In 2018, Louisiana was ranked as the least healthy state in the country, with high levels of drug-related deaths. It also has had the highest homicide rate in the United States since at least the 1990s.

== Etymology ==
Louisiana was named after Louis XIV, King of France from 1643 to 1715. When René-Robert Cavelier, Sieur de La Salle claimed the territory drained by the Mississippi River for France, he named it La Louisiane. The suffix –ana (or –ane) is a Latin suffix that can refer to "information relating to a particular individual, subject, or place." Thus, roughly, Louis + ana carries the idea of "related to Louis". Once part of the French colonial empire, the Louisiana Territory stretched from present-day Mobile Bay to just north of the present-day Canada–United States border, including a small part of what are now the Canadian provinces of Alberta and Saskatchewan.

== History ==
=== Pre–colonial history ===
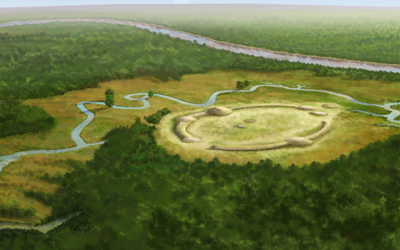
Watson Brake, the oldest mound complex in North America

The area of Louisiana is the place of origin of the Mound Builders culture during the Middle Archaic period, in the 4th millennium BC. The sites of Caney and Frenchman's Bend have been securely dated to 5600–5000 BP (about 3700–3100 BC), demonstrating that seasonal hunter-gatherers from around this time organized to build complex earthwork constructions in what is now northern Louisiana. The Watson Brake site near present-day Monroe has an eleven-mound complex; it was built about 5400 BP (3500 BC). These discoveries overturned previous assumptions in archaeology that such complex mounds were built only by cultures of more settled peoples who were dependent on maize cultivation. The Hedgepeth Site in Lincoln Parish is more recent, dated to 5200–4500 BP (3300–2600 BC).

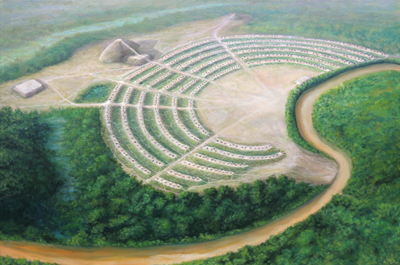
Poverty Point UNESCO site

Nearly 2,000 years later, Poverty Point was built; it is the largest and best-known Late Archaic site in the state. The city of modern–day Epps developed near it. The Poverty Point culture may have reached its peak around 1500 BC, making it the first complex culture, and possibly the first tribal culture in North America. It lasted until approximately 700 BC.

The Poverty Point culture was followed by the Tchefuncte and Lake Cormorant cultures of the Tchula period, local manifestations of Early Woodland period. The Tchefuncte culture were the first people in the area of Louisiana to make large amounts of pottery. These cultures lasted until 200 AD. The Middle Woodland period started in Louisiana with the Marksville culture in the southern and eastern part of the state, reaching across the Mississippi River to the east around Natchez, and the Fourche Maline culture in the northwestern part of the state. The Marksville culture was named after the Marksville Prehistoric Indian Site in Avoyelles Parish.

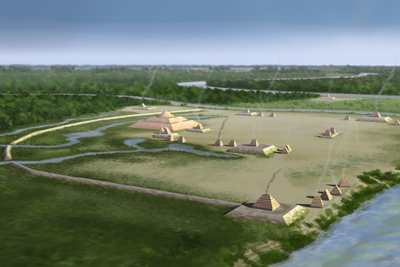
Troyville Earthworks, once the second tallest earthworks in North America

These cultures were contemporaneous with the Hopewell cultures of present-day Ohio and Illinois, and participated in the Hopewell Exchange Network. Trade with peoples to the southwest brought the bow and arrow. The first burial mounds were built at this time. Political power began to be consolidated, as the first platform mounds at ritual centers were constructed for the developing hereditary political and religious leadership.

By 400 the Late Woodland period had begun with the Baytown culture, Troyville culture, and Coastal Troyville during the Baytown period and were succeeded by the Coles Creek cultures. Where the Baytown peoples built dispersed settlements, the Troyville people instead continued building major earthwork centers. Population increased dramatically and there is strong evidence of a growing cultural and political complexity. Many Coles Creek sites were erected over earlier Woodland period mortuary mounds. Scholars have speculated that emerging elites were symbolically and physically appropriating dead ancestors to emphasize and project their own authority.

The Mississippian period in Louisiana was marked by the emergence of the Plaquemine and Caddoan Mississippian cultures. During this era, indigenous populations adopted intensive maize-based agriculture, cultivating diverse, regionally adapted strains of the plant through deliberate seed selection and crop management. The Plaquemine culture in the lower Mississippi River Valley in western Mississippi and eastern Louisiana began in 1200 and continued to about 1600. Examples in Louisiana include the Medora site, the archaeological type site for the culture in West Baton Rouge Parish whose characteristics helped define the culture, the Atchafalaya Basin Mounds in St. Mary Parish, the Fitzhugh Mounds in Madison Parish, the Scott Place Mounds in Union Parish, and the Sims site in St. Charles Parish.

Plaquemine culture was contemporaneous with the Middle Mississippian culture that is represented by its largest settlement, the Cahokia site in Illinois east of St. Louis, Missouri. At its peak Cahokia is estimated to have had a population of more than 20,000. The Plaquemine culture is considered ancestral to the historic Natchez and Taensa peoples, whose descendants encountered Europeans in the colonial era.

By 1000 in the northwestern part of the state, the Fourche Maline culture had evolved into the Caddoan Mississippian culture. The Caddoan Mississippians occupied a large territory, including what is now eastern Oklahoma, western Arkansas, northeast Texas, and northwest Louisiana. Archaeological evidence has demonstrated that the cultural continuity is unbroken from prehistory to the present. The Caddo and related Caddo-language speakers in prehistoric times and at first European contact were the direct ancestors of the modern Caddo Nation of Oklahoma of today. Significant Caddoan Mississippian archaeological sites in Louisiana include Belcher Mound Site in Caddo Parish and Gahagan Mounds Site in Red River Parish.

Many current place names in Louisiana, including Atchafalaya, Natchitouches (now spelled Natchitoches), Caddo, Houma, Tangipahoa, and Avoyel (as Avoyelles), are transliterations of those used in various Native American languages.

=== Exploration and colonization by Europeans ===
The first European explorers to visit Louisiana came in 1528 when a Spanish expedition led by Pánfilo de Narváez located the mouth of the Mississippi River. In 1542, Hernando de Soto's expedition skirted to the north and west of the state (encountering Caddo and Tunica groups) and then followed the Mississippi River down to the Gulf of Mexico in 1543. Spanish interest in Louisiana faded away for a century and a half.

In the late 17th century, French and French Canadian expeditions, which included sovereign, religious and commercial aims, established a foothold on the Mississippi River and Gulf Coast. With its first settlements, France laid claim to a vast region of North America and set out to establish a commercial empire and French nation stretching from the Gulf of Mexico to Canada.

In 1682, the French explorer Robert Cavelier de La Salle named the region Louisiana to honor King Louis XIV of France. The first permanent settlement, Fort Maurepas (now Ocean Springs, Mississippi), was founded in 1699 by Pierre Le Moyne d'Iberville, a French military officer from New France. By then the French had also built a small fort at the mouth of the Mississippi at a settlement they named La Balise (or La Balize), "seamark" in French. By 1721, they built a 62-foot (19 m) wooden lighthouse-type structure here to guide ships on the river.

A royal ordinance of 1722—following the Crown's transfer of the Illinois Country's governance from Canada to Louisiana—may have featured the broadest definition of Louisiana: all land claimed by France south of the Great Lakes between the Rocky Mountains and the Alleghenies. A generation later, trade conflicts between Canada and Louisiana led to a more defined boundary between the French colonies; in 1745, Louisiana governor general Vaudreuil set the northern and eastern bounds of his domain as the Wabash valley up to the mouth of the Vermilion River (near present-day Danville, Illinois); from there, northwest to le Rocher on the Illinois River, and from there west to the mouth of the Rock River (at present day Rock Island, Illinois). Thus, Vincennes and Peoria were the limit of Louisiana's reach; the outposts at Ouiatenon (on the upper Wabash near present-day Lafayette, Indiana), Chicago, Fort Miamis (near present-day Fort Wayne, Indiana), and Prairie du Chien, Wisconsin, operated as dependencies of Canada.

The settlement of Natchitoches (along the Red River in present-day northwest Louisiana) was established in 1714 by Louis Juchereau de St. Denis, making it the oldest permanent European settlement in the modern state of Louisiana. The French settlement had two purposes: to establish trade with the Spanish in Texas via the Old San Antonio Road, and to deter Spanish advances into Louisiana. The settlement soon became a flourishing river port and crossroads, giving rise to vast cotton kingdoms along the river that were worked by imported African slaves. Over time, planters developed large plantations and built fine homes in a growing town. This became a pattern repeated in New Orleans and other places, although the commodity crop in the south was primarily sugar cane.

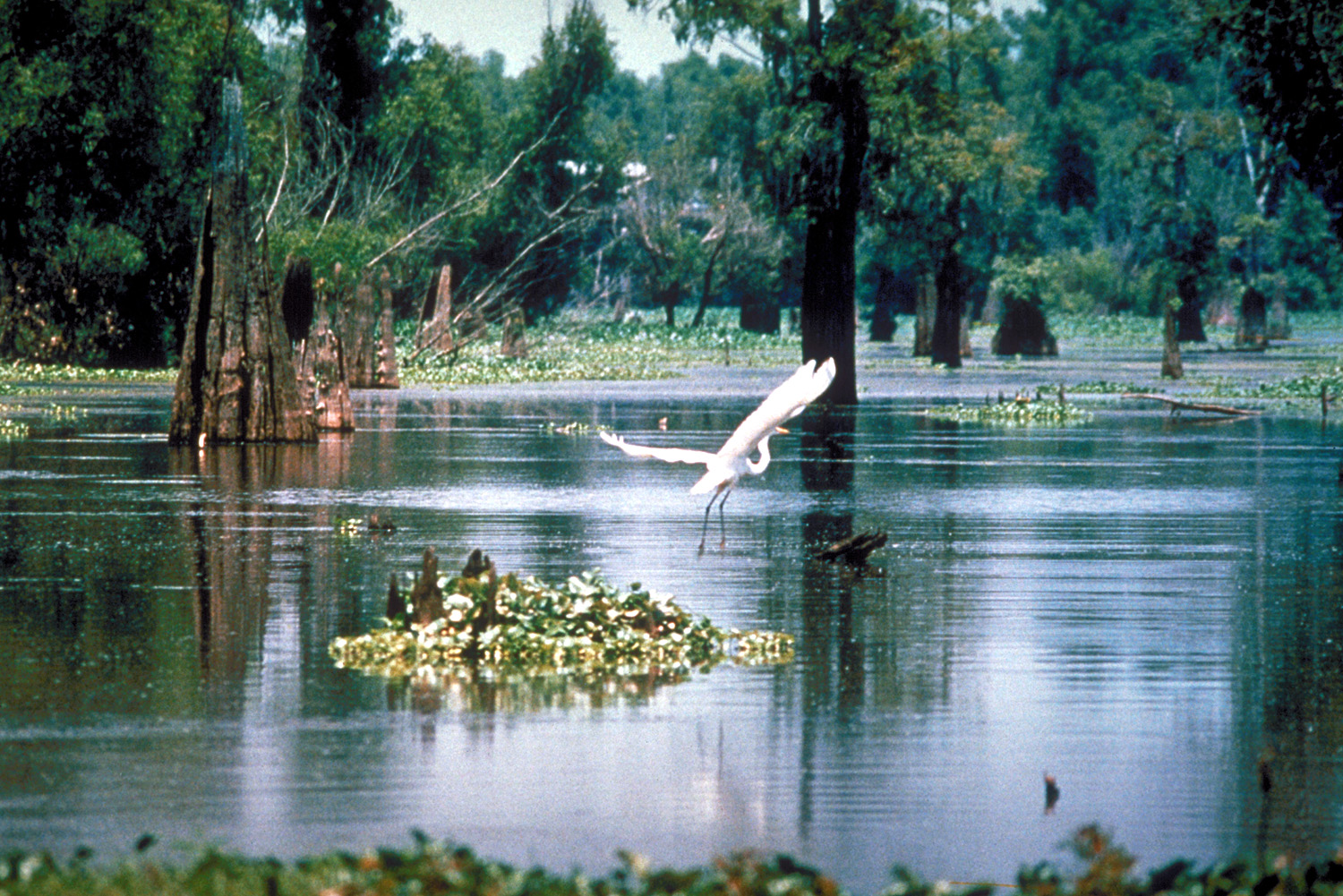
French Acadians, who came to be known as Cajuns, settled in southern Louisiana, especially along the banks of its major bayous.

Louisiana's French settlements contributed to further exploration and outposts, concentrated along the banks of the Mississippi and its major tributaries, from Louisiana to as far north as the region called the Illinois Country, around present-day St. Louis, Missouri. The latter was settled by French colonists from Illinois.

Initially, Mobile and then Biloxi served as the capital of La Louisiane. Recognizing the importance of the Mississippi River to trade and military interests, and wanting to protect the capital from severe coastal storms, France developed New Orleans from 1722 as the seat of civilian and military authority south of the Great Lakes. From then until the United States acquired the territory in the Louisiana Purchase of 1803, France and Spain jockeyed for control of New Orleans and the lands west of the Mississippi.

In the 1720s, German immigrants settled along the Mississippi River, in a region referred to as the German Coast.

In 1763, France ceded most of its territory east of the Mississippi to Great Britain, in the aftermath of Britain's victory in the Seven Years' War (generally referred to in North America as the French and Indian War). This included the lands along the Gulf Coast and north of Lake Pontchartrain to the Mississippi River, which became known as British West Florida. The rest of Louisiana west of the Mississippi, as well as the "isle of New Orleans", had become a colony of Spain by the Treaty of Fontainebleau (1762). The transfer of power on either side of the river would be delayed until later in the decade.

In 1765, during Spanish rule, several thousand Acadians from the French colony of Acadia (now Nova Scotia, New Brunswick, and Prince Edward Island) made their way to Louisiana after having been expelled from Acadia by the British government after the French and Indian War. They settled chiefly in the southwestern Louisiana region now called Acadiana. The governor Luis de Unzaga y Amézaga, eager to gain more settlers, welcomed the Acadians, who became the ancestors of Louisiana's Cajuns.

Spanish Canary Islanders, called Isleños, emigrated from the Canary Islands of Spain to Louisiana under the Spanish crown between 1778 and 1783. In 1800, French Consul Napoleon Bonaparte reacquired Louisiana from Spain in the Treaty of San Ildefonso, an arrangement kept secret for two years.

=== Expansion of slavery ===
A map of New France (blue color) in 1750, before the French and Indian War

In 1708, Jean-Baptiste Le Moyne, Sieur de Bienville brought the first two African slaves to Louisiana, transporting them from a French colony in the West Indies. In 1709, French financier Antoine Crozat obtained a monopoly of commerce in La Louisiane, which extended from the Gulf of Mexico to what is now Illinois. According to historian Hugh Thomas, "that concession allowed him to bring in a cargo of blacks from Africa every year". Starting in 1719, traders began to import slaves in higher numbers; two French ships, the Du Maine and the Aurore, arrived in New Orleans carrying more than 500 black slaves coming from Africa. Previous slaves in Louisiana had been transported from French colonies in the West Indies. By the end of 1721, New Orleans counted 1,256 inhabitants, of whom about half were slaves.

In 1724, the French government issued a law called the Code Noir ("Black Code" in English) which regulated the interaction of whites (blancs) and blacks (noirs) in its colony of Louisiana (which was much larger than the current state of Louisiana). After the Sale of Louisiana, French Law survived in the Louisiana, such as the prohibition and outlaw of any cruel punishment.

Fugitive slaves, called maroons, could easily hide in the backcountry of the bayous and survive in small settlements. The word "maroon" comes from the Spanish "cimarron", which means "fierce" or "unruly".

In the late 18th century, the last Spanish governor of the Louisiana territory wrote:

Truly, it is impossible for lower Louisiana to get along without slaves and with the use of slaves, the colony had been making great strides toward prosperity and wealth.

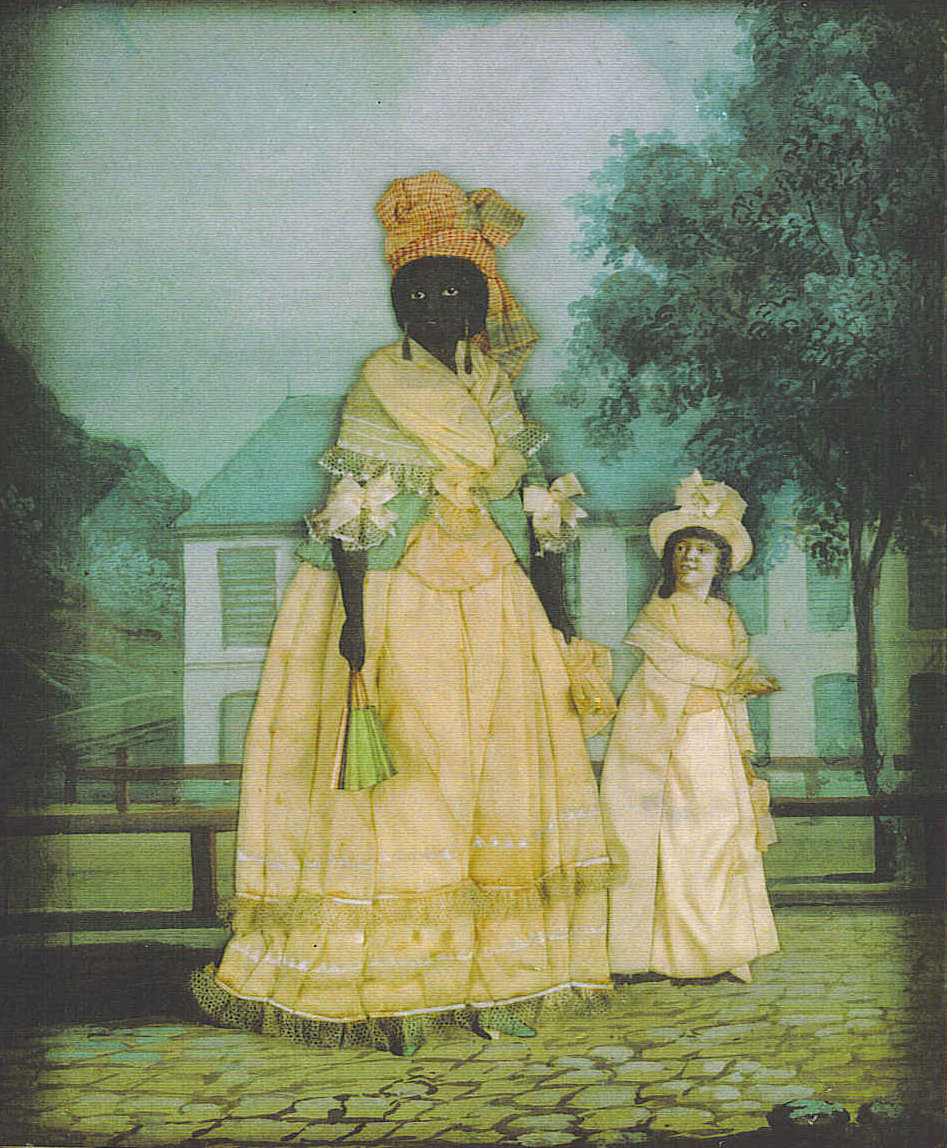
A free woman of color with a mixed-race daughter, late 18th-century collage painting, New Orleans

When the United States purchased Louisiana in 1803, it was soon accepted that slaves could be brought to Louisiana as easily as they were brought to neighboring Mississippi, though it violated U.S. law to do so. Despite demands by United States Rep. James Hillhouse and by the pamphleteer Thomas Paine to enforce existing federal law against slavery in the newly acquired territory, slavery prevailed because it was the source of great profits and the lowest-cost labor.

At the start of the 19th century, Louisiana was a small producer of sugar with a relatively small number of slaves, compared to Saint-Domingue and the West Indies. It soon thereafter became a major sugar producer as new settlers arrived to develop plantations. William C. C. Claiborne, Louisiana's first United States governor, said African slave labor was needed because white laborers "cannot be had in this unhealthy climate." Hugh Thomas wrote that Claiborne was unable to enforce the abolition of the Atlantic slave trade, which the U.S. and Great Britain enacted in 1807. The United States continued to protect the domestic slave trade, including the coastwise trade—the transport of slaves by ship along the Atlantic Coast and to New Orleans and other Gulf ports.

By 1840, New Orleans had the biggest slave market in the United States, which contributed greatly to the economy of the city and of the state. New Orleans had become one of the wealthiest cities, and the third largest city, in the nation. The ban on the African slave trade and importation of slaves had increased demand in the domestic market. During the decades after the American Revolutionary War, more than one million enslaved African Americans underwent forced migration from the Upper South to the Deep South, two thirds of them in the slave trade. Others were transported by their owners as slaveholders moved west for new lands.

With changing agriculture in the Upper South as planters shifted from tobacco to less labor-intensive mixed agriculture, planters had excess laborers. Many sold slaves to traders to take to the Deep South. Slaves were driven by traders overland from the Upper South or transported to New Orleans and other coastal markets by ship in the coastwise slave trade. After sales in New Orleans, steamboats operating on the Mississippi transported slaves upstream to markets or plantation destinations at Natchez and Memphis.

Unusually for a slave-state, Louisiana harbored escaped Filipino slaves from the Manila Galleons. The members of the Filipino community were then commonly referred to as Manila men, or Manilamen, and later Tagalas, as they were free when they created the oldest settlement of Asians in the United States in the village of Saint Malo, Louisiana, the inhabitants of which, even joined the United States in the War of 1812 against the British Empire while they were being led by the French-American Jean Lafitte.

=== Asylum and influence of Creoles from Saint-Domingue ===
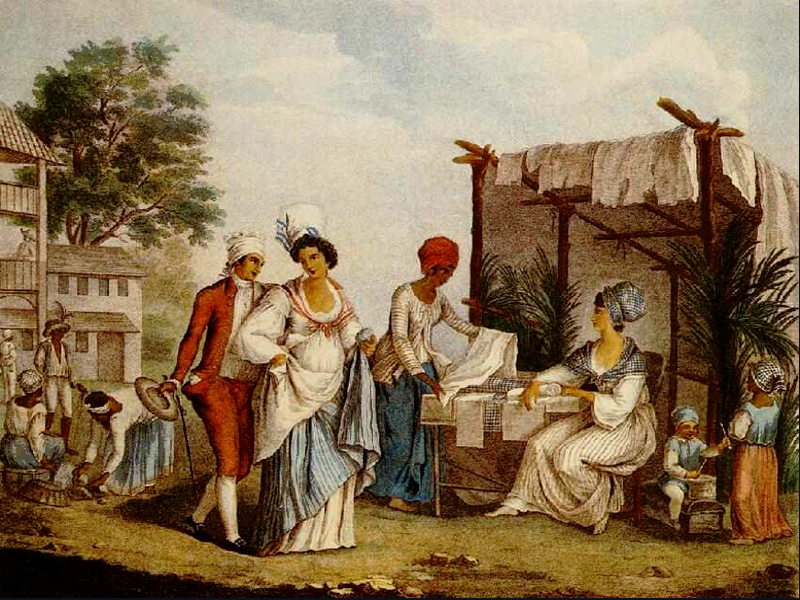
Saint-Domingue Creoles

Spanish occupation of Louisiana lasted from 1769 to 1800. Beginning in the 1790s, waves of immigration took place from Saint-Domingue as refugees poured over following a slave rebellion that started during the French Revolution of Saint-Domingue in 1791. Over the next decade, thousands of refugees landed in Louisiana from the island, including Europeans, Creoles, and Africans, some of the latter brought in by each free group. They greatly increased the French-speaking population in New Orleans and Louisiana, as well as the number of Africans, and the slaves reinforced African culture in the city.

Anglo-American officials initially made attempts to keep out the additional Creoles of color, but the Louisiana Creoles wanted to increase the Creole population: more than half of the refugees eventually settled in Louisiana, and the majority remained in New Orleans.

Pierre Clément de Laussat (Governor, 1803) said: "Saint-Domingue was, of all our colonies in the Antilles, the one whose mentality and customs influenced Louisiana the most."

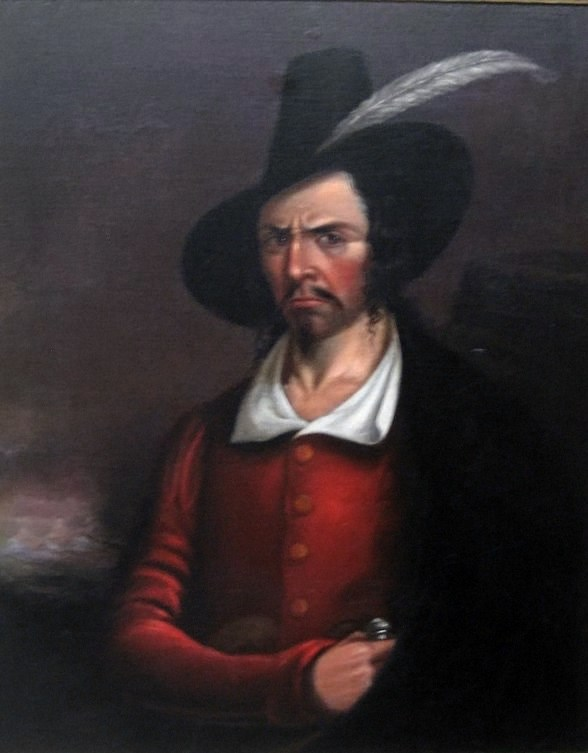
French pirate Jean Lafitte, who operated in New Orleans, was born in Port-au-Prince around 1782.

=== Purchase by the United States ===
When the United States won its independence from Great Britain in 1783, one of its major concerns was having a European power on its western boundary, and the need for unrestricted access to the Mississippi River. As American settlers pushed west, they found that the Appalachian Mountains provided a barrier to shipping goods eastward. The easiest way to ship produce was to use a flatboat to float it down the Ohio and Mississippi rivers to the port of New Orleans, where goods could be put on ocean-going vessels. The problem with this route was that the Spanish owned both sides of the Mississippi below Natchez.

Napoleon's ambitions in Louisiana involved the creation of a new empire centered on the Caribbean sugar trade. By the terms of the Treaty of Amiens of 1802, Great Britain returned control of the islands of Martinique and Guadeloupe to the French. Napoleon looked upon Louisiana as a depot for these sugar islands, and as a buffer to U.S. settlement. In October 1801 he sent a large military force to take back Saint-Domingue, then under control of Toussaint Louverture after the Haitian Revolution. When the army led by Napoleon's brother-in-law Leclerc was defeated, Napoleon decided to sell Louisiana.

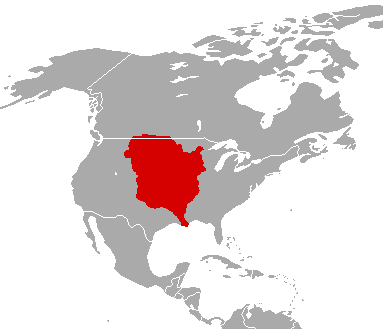
A map of Louisiana in 1800

Thomas Jefferson, third president of the United States, was disturbed by Napoleon's plans to re-establish French colonies in North America. With the possession of New Orleans, Napoleon could close the Mississippi to U.S. commerce at any time. Jefferson authorized Robert R. Livingston, U.S. minister to France, to negotiate for the purchase of the city of New Orleans, portions of the east bank of the Mississippi, and free navigation of the river for U.S. commerce. Livingston was authorized to pay up to $2 million.

An official transfer of Louisiana to French ownership had not yet taken place, and Napoleon's deal with the Spanish was a poorly kept secret on the frontier. On October 18, 1802, however, Juan Ventura Morales, acting intendant of Louisiana, made public the intention of Spain to revoke the right of deposit at New Orleans for all cargo from the United States. The closure of this vital port to the United States caused anger and consternation. Commerce in the west was virtually blockaded. Historians believe the revocation of the right of deposit was prompted by abuses by the Americans, particularly smuggling, and not by French intrigues as was believed at the time. President Jefferson ignored public pressure for war with France, and appointed James Monroe a special envoy to Napoleon, to assist in obtaining New Orleans for the United States. Jefferson also raised the authorized expenditure to $10 million.

On April 11, 1803, French foreign minister Talleyrand unexpectedly asked Livingston to purchase the entire Louisiana Territory, far exceeding the authorized negotiations for just New Orleans. Monroe agreed with Livingston that Napoleon might withdraw this offer at any time (leaving them with no ability to obtain the desired New Orleans area), and that approval from President Jefferson might take months, so Livingston and Monroe decided to open negotiations immediately. By April 30, they closed a deal for the purchase of the entire Louisiana territory of 828,000 square miles (2,100,000 km^{2}) for sixty million Francs (approximately $15 million).

Part of this sum, $3.5 million, was used to forgive debts owed by France to the United States. The payment was made in United States bonds, which Napoleon sold at face value to the Dutch firm of Hope and Company, and the British banking house of Baring, at a discount of 87 1/2 per each $100 unit. As a result, France received only $8,831,250 in cash for Louisiana. English banker Alexander Baring conferred with Marbois in Paris, shuttled to the United States to pick up the bonds, took them to Britain, and returned to France with the money—which Napoleon used to wage war against Baring's own country.

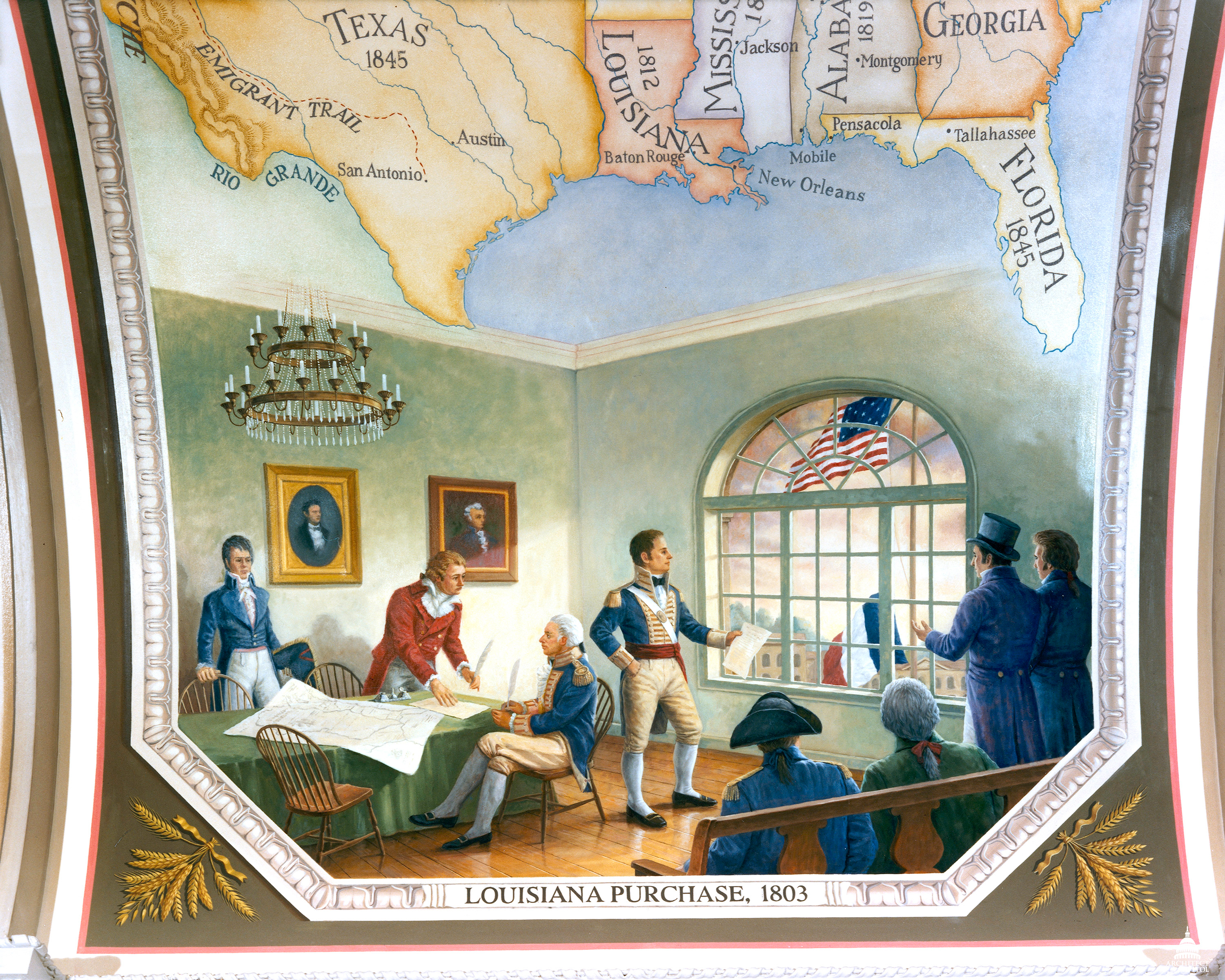
The Louisiana Purchase, 1803

When news of the purchase reached the United States, Jefferson was surprised. He had authorized the expenditure of $10 million for a port city, and instead received treaties committing the government to spend $15 million on a land package which would double the size of the country. Jefferson's political opponents in the Federalist Party argued the Louisiana purchase was a worthless desert, and that the U.S. constitution did not provide for the acquisition of new land or negotiating treaties without the consent of the federal legislature.

What really worried the opposition was the new states which would inevitably be carved from the Louisiana territory, strengthening western and southern interests in U.S. Congress, and further reducing the influence of New England Federalists in national affairs. President Jefferson was an enthusiastic supporter of westward expansion, and held firm in his support for the treaty. Despite Federalist objections, the U.S. Senate ratified the Louisiana treaty on October 20, 1803.

By statute enacted on October 31, 1803, President Thomas Jefferson was authorized to take possession of the territories ceded by France and provide for initial governance. A transfer ceremony was held in New Orleans on November 29, 1803. Since the Louisiana territory had never officially been turned over to the French, the Spanish took down their flag, and the French raised theirs. The following day, General James Wilkinson accepted possession of New Orleans for the United States. The Louisiana Territory, purchased for less than three cents an acre, doubled the size of the United States overnight, without a war or the loss of a single American life, and set a precedent for the purchase of territory. It opened the way for the eventual expansion of the United States across the continent to the Pacific Ocean.

Shortly after the United States took possession, the area was divided into two territories along the 33rd parallel north on March 26, 1804, thereby organizing the Territory of Orleans to the south and the District of Louisiana, subsequently formed as the Louisiana Territory, to the north.

=== Statehood ===
Louisiana became the eighteenth U.S. state on April 30, 1812; the Territory of Orleans became the State of Louisiana and the Louisiana Territory was simultaneously renamed the Missouri Territory.

At its creation, the state of Louisiana did not include the area north and east of the Mississippi River known as the Florida Parishes. On April 14, 1812, Congress had authorized Louisiana to expand its borders to include the Florida Parishes, but the border change required approval of the state legislature, which it did not give until August 4. For the roughly three months in between, the northern border of eastern Louisiana was the course of Bayou Manchac and the middle of Lake Maurepas and Lake Pontchartrain. "From the mid-1820s to 1861, Louisiana moved from a political system based on personality and ethnicity to a distinct two-party system. Democrats competed first against the Whig Party, then the Know Nothing Party, and finally—on the eve of the Civil War—only against other Democrats."

=== Secession and the Civil War ===
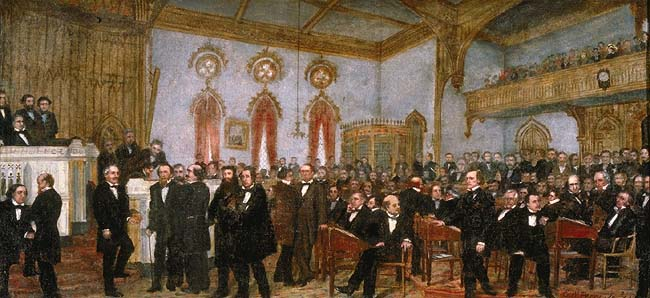
'Signing the Ordinance of Secession of Louisiana, January 26, 1861', oil on canvas painting, 1861

Capture of New Orleans, April 1862, colored lithograph of engraving

According to the 1860 census, 331,726 people were enslaved, nearly 47% of the state's total population of 708,002. The strong economic interest of elite whites in maintaining the slave society contributed to Louisiana's decision to secede from the Union on January 26, 1861. It followed other U.S. states in seceding after the election of Abraham Lincoln as president of the United States. Louisiana's secession was announced on January 26, 1861, and it became part of the Confederate States of America.

The state was quickly defeated in the Civil War, a result of Union strategy to cut the Confederacy in two by controlling the Mississippi River. Federal troops captured New Orleans on April 25, 1862. Because a large part of the population had Union sympathies (or compatible commercial interests), the federal government took the unusual step of designating the areas of Louisiana under federal control as a state within the Union, with its own elected representatives to the U.S. Congress.

=== Post–Civil War to mid–20th century ===
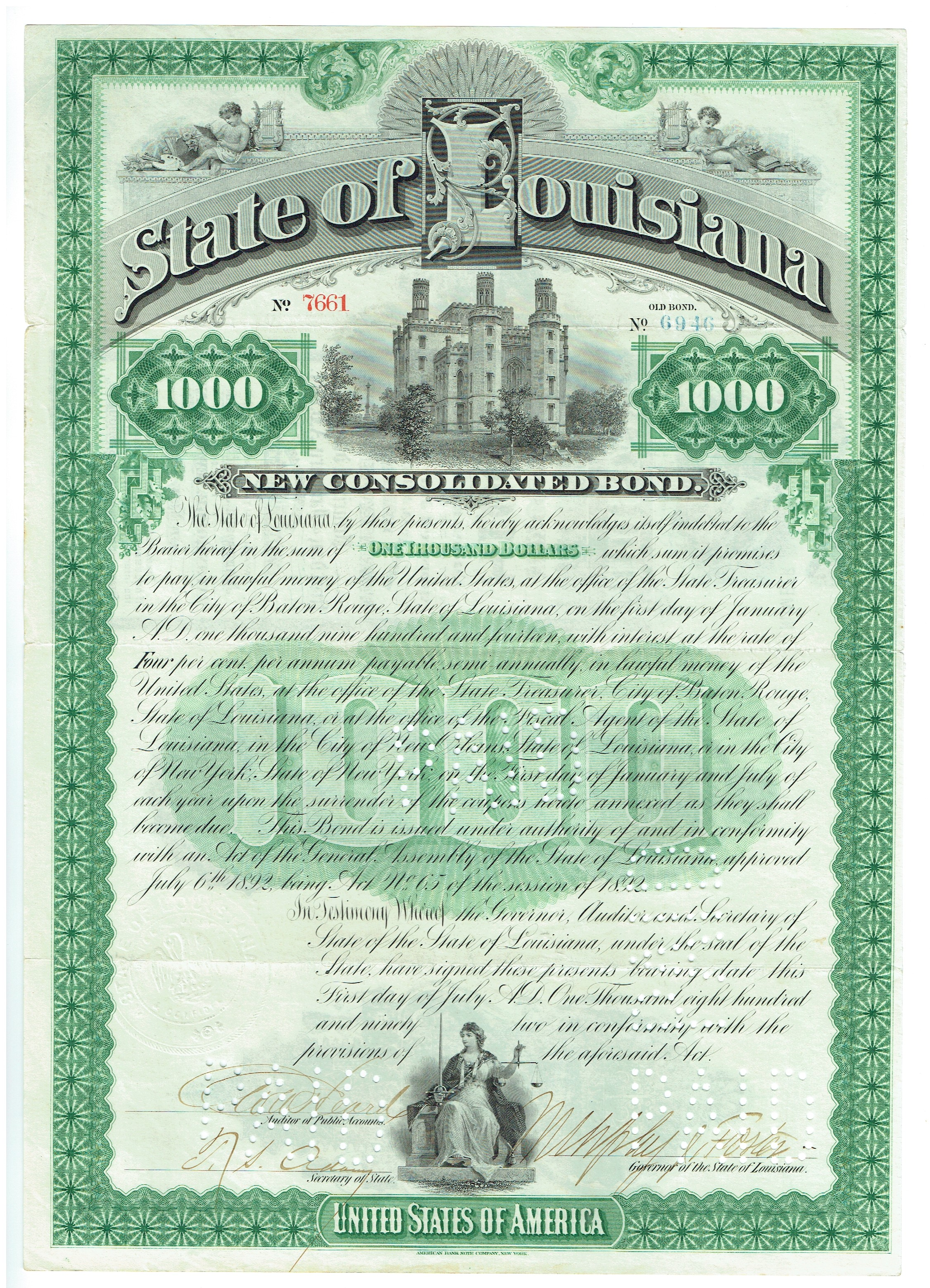
A Consolidated Bond of the State of Louisiana, issued July 1892

Following the American Civil War and emancipation of slaves, violence rose in the southern U.S. as the war was carried on by insurgent private and paramilitary groups. During the initial period after the war, there was a massive rise in black participation in terms of voting and holding political office. Louisiana saw the United States' first and second black governors with Oscar Dunn and P.B.S. Pinchback, with 125 black members of the state legislature being elected during this time, while Charles E. Nash was elected to represent the state's 6th Congressional District in the U.S. House of Representatives.

Eventually former Confederates came to dominate the state legislature after the end of Reconstruction. Federal occupation in the late 1870s, and black codes were implemented to regulate freedmen and increasingly restricted the right to vote. They refused to extend voting rights to African Americans who had been free before the war and had sometimes obtained education and property (as in New Orleans).

Following the Memphis riots of 1866 and the New Orleans riot the same year, the Fourteenth Amendment was passed that provided suffrage and full citizenship for freedmen. Congress passed the Reconstruction Act, establishing military districts for those states where conditions were considered the worst, including Louisiana. It was grouped with Texas in what was administered as the Fifth Military District.

African Americans began to live as citizens with some measure of equality before the law. Both freedmen and people of color who had been free before the war began to make more advances in education, family stability and jobs. At the same time, there was tremendous social volatility in the aftermath of war, with many whites actively resisting defeat and the free labor market. White insurgents mobilized to enforce white supremacy, first in Ku Klux Klan chapters.

By 1877, when federal forces were withdrawn, white Democrats in Louisiana and other states had regained control of state legislatures, often by paramilitary groups such as the White League, which suppressed black voting through intimidation and violence. Following Mississippi's example in 1890, in 1898, the white Democratic, planter-dominated legislature passed a new constitution that effectively disfranchised people of color by raising barriers to voter registration, such as poll taxes, residency requirements and literacy tests. The effect was immediate and long lasting. In 1896, there were 130,334 black voters on the rolls and about the same number of white voters, in proportion to the state population, which was evenly divided.

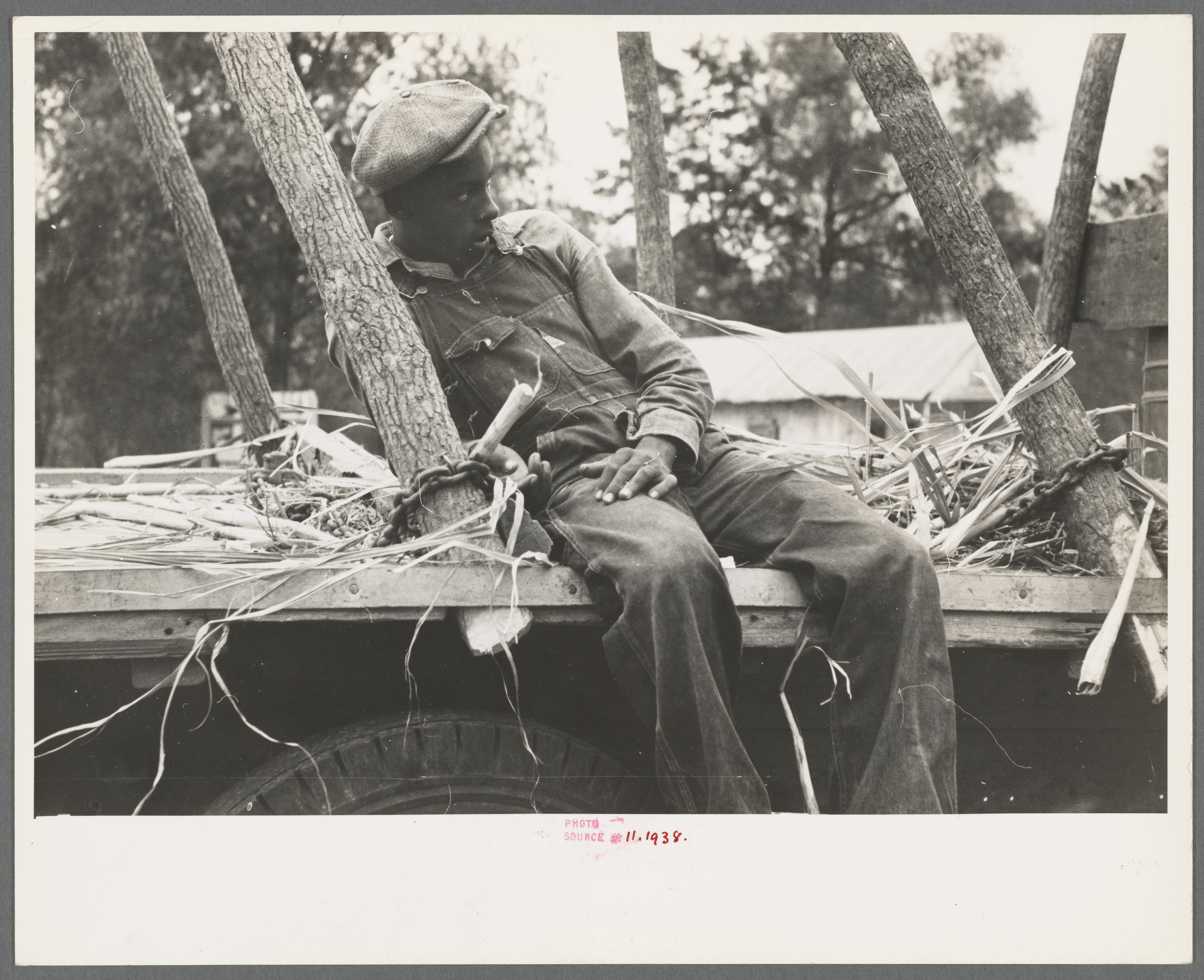
A young African American man in Morganza, 1938

The state population in 1900 was 47% African American: a total of 652,013 citizens. Many in New Orleans were descendants of Creoles of color, the sizeable population of free people of color before the Civil War. By 1900, two years after the new constitution, only 5,320 black voters were registered in the state. Because of disfranchisement, by 1910 there were only 730 black voters (less than 0.5 percent of eligible African-American men), despite advances in education and literacy among blacks and people of color. Blacks were excluded from the political system and also unable to serve on juries. White Democrats had established one-party Democratic rule, which they maintained in the state for decades deep into the 20th century until after congressional passage of the 1965 Voting Rights Act provided federal oversight and enforcement of the constitutional right to vote.

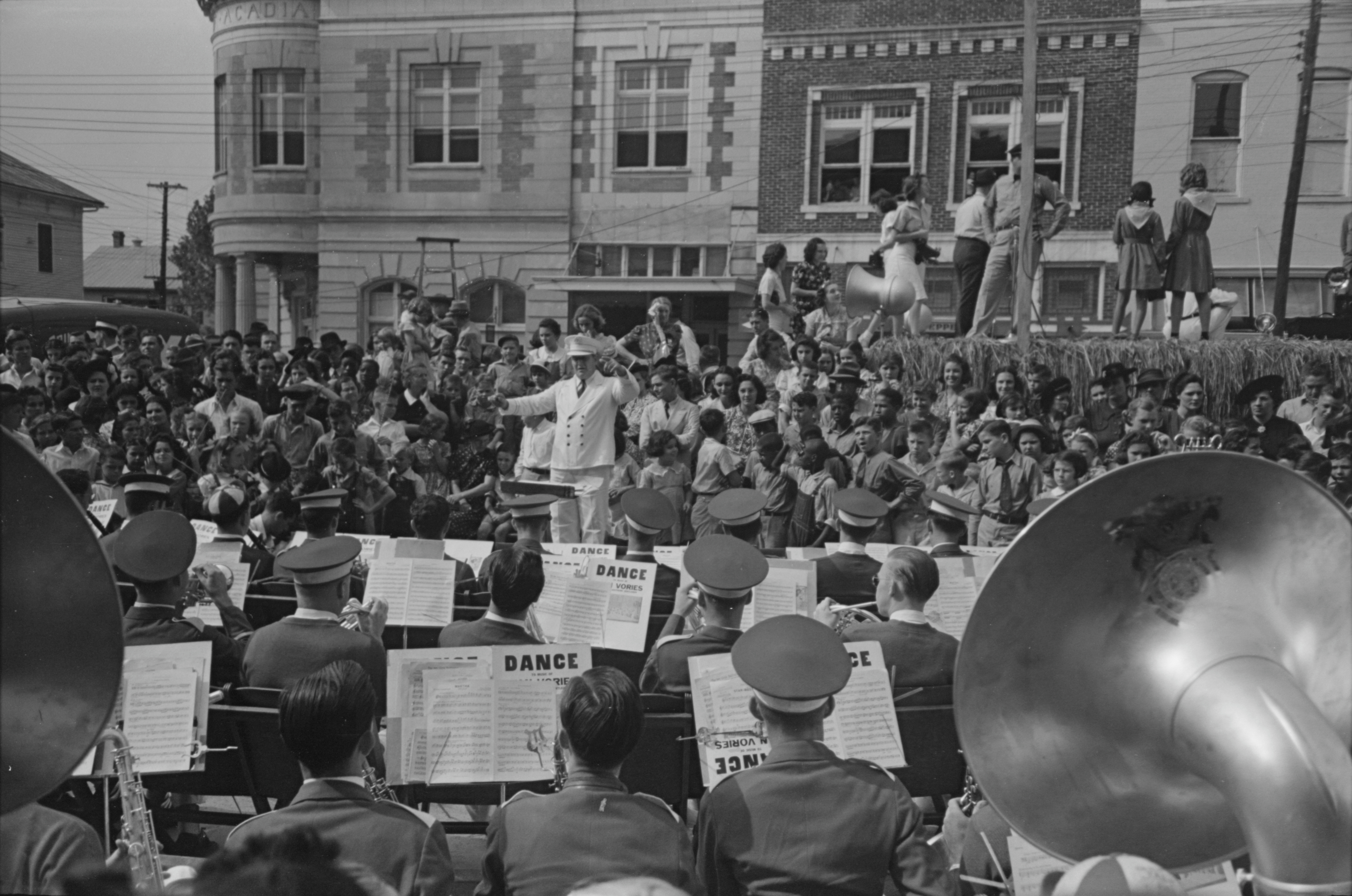
National Rice Festival, Crowley, Louisiana, 1938

During the early 20th century, thousands of African Americans left Louisiana in the Great Migration north to industrial cities for jobs and education, and to escape Jim Crow society and lynchings. The boll weevil infestation and agricultural problems cost many sharecroppers and farmers their jobs. The mechanization of agriculture also reduced the need for laborers. Beginning in the 1940s, blacks went west to California for jobs in its expanding defense industries.

In 1920, Louisiana had no continuous paved roads running east to west, or north to south which traversed the entire state.

During some of the Great Depression, Louisiana was led by Governor Huey Long. He was elected to office on populist appeal. His public works projects provided thousands of jobs to people in need, and he supported education and increased suffrage for poor whites, but Long was criticized for his allegedly demagogic and autocratic style. He extended patronage control through every branch of Louisiana's state government. Especially controversial were his plans for wealth redistribution in the state. Long's rule ended abruptly when he was assassinated in the state capitol in 1935.

=== Mid–20th century to present ===
Mobilization for World War II created jobs in the state. But thousands of other workers, black and white alike, migrated to California for better jobs in its burgeoning defense industry. Many African Americans left the state in the Second Great Migration, from the 1940s through the 1960s to escape social oppression and seek better jobs. The mechanization of agriculture in the 1930s had sharply cut the need for laborers. They sought skilled jobs in the defense industry in California, better education for their children, and living in communities where they could vote.

On November 26, 1958, at Chennault Air Force Base, a USAF B-47 bomber with a nuclear weapon on board developed a fire while on the ground. The aircraft wreckage and the site of the accident were contaminated after a limited explosion of non-nuclear material.

In the 1950s the state created new requirements for a citizenship test for voter registration. Despite opposition by the States' Rights Party (Dixiecrats), downstate black voters had begun to increase their rate of registration, which also reflected the growth of their middle classes. In 1960 the state established the Louisiana State Sovereignty Commission, to investigate civil rights activists and maintain segregation.

Despite this, gradually black voter registration and turnout increased to 20% and more, and it was 32% by 1964, when the first national civil rights legislation of the era was passed. The percentage of black voters ranged widely in the state during these years, from 93.8% in Evangeline Parish to 1.7% in Tensas Parish, for instance, where there were intense white efforts to suppress the vote in the black-majority parish.

Violent attacks on civil rights activists in two mill towns were catalysts to the founding of the first two chapters of the Deacons for Defense and Justice in late 1964 and early 1965, in Jonesboro and Bogalusa, respectively. Made up of veterans of World War II and the Korean War, they were armed self-defense groups established to protect activists and their families. Continued violent white resistance in Bogalusa to blacks trying to use public facilities in 1965, following passage of the Civil Rights Act of 1964, caused the federal government to order local police to protect the activists. Other chapters were formed in Mississippi and Alabama.

By 1960 the proportion of African Americans in Louisiana had dropped to 32%. The 1,039,207 black citizens were still suppressed by segregation and disfranchisement. African Americans continued to suffer disproportionate discriminatory application of the state's voter registration rules. Because of better opportunities elsewhere, from 1965 to 1970, blacks continued to migrate out of Louisiana, for a net loss of more than 37,000 people. Based on official census figures, the African American population in 1970 stood at 1,085,109, a net gain of more than 46,000 people compared to 1960. During the latter period, some people began to migrate to cities of the New South for opportunities. Since that period, blacks entered the political system and began to be elected to office, as well as having other opportunities.

On May 21, 1919, the Nineteenth Amendment to the United States Constitution, giving women full rights to vote, was passed at a national level, and was made the law throughout the United States on August 18, 1920. Louisiana finally ratified the amendment on June 11, 1970.

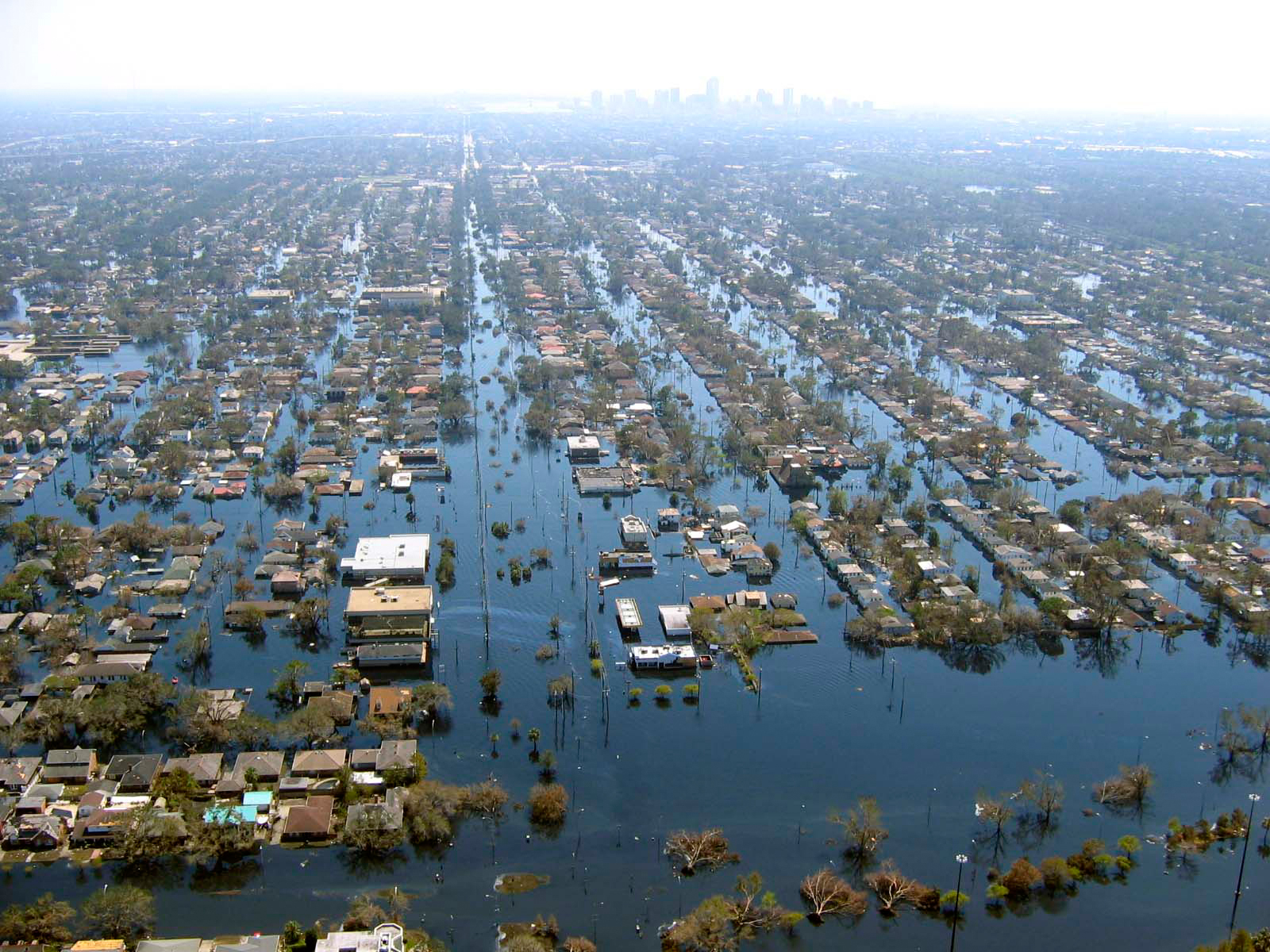
Flooded New Orleans in the aftermath of Hurricane Katrina

Due to its location on the Gulf Coast, Louisiana has regularly suffered the effects of tropical storms and damaging hurricanes. On August 29, 2005, New Orleans and many other low-lying parts of the state along the Gulf of Mexico were hit by the catastrophic Hurricane Katrina. It caused widespread damage due to breaching of levees and large-scale flooding of more than 80% of the city. Officials had issued warnings to evacuate the city and nearby areas, but tens of thousands of people, mostly African Americans, stayed behind, many of them stranded. Many people died and survivors suffered through the damage of the widespread floodwaters.

In July 2016 the shooting of Alton Sterling sparked protests throughout the state capital of Baton Rouge. In August 2016, an unnamed storm dumped trillions of gallons of rain on southern Louisiana, including the cities of Denham Springs, Baton Rouge, Gonzales, St. Amant and Lafayette, causing catastrophic flooding. An estimated 110,000 homes were damaged and thousands of residents were displaced. In 2019, three Louisiana black churches were destroyed by arson.

The first case of COVID-19 in Louisiana was announced on March 9, 2020. As of October 27, 2020, there had been 180,069 confirmed cases; 5,854 people have died of COVID-19.

== Geography ==
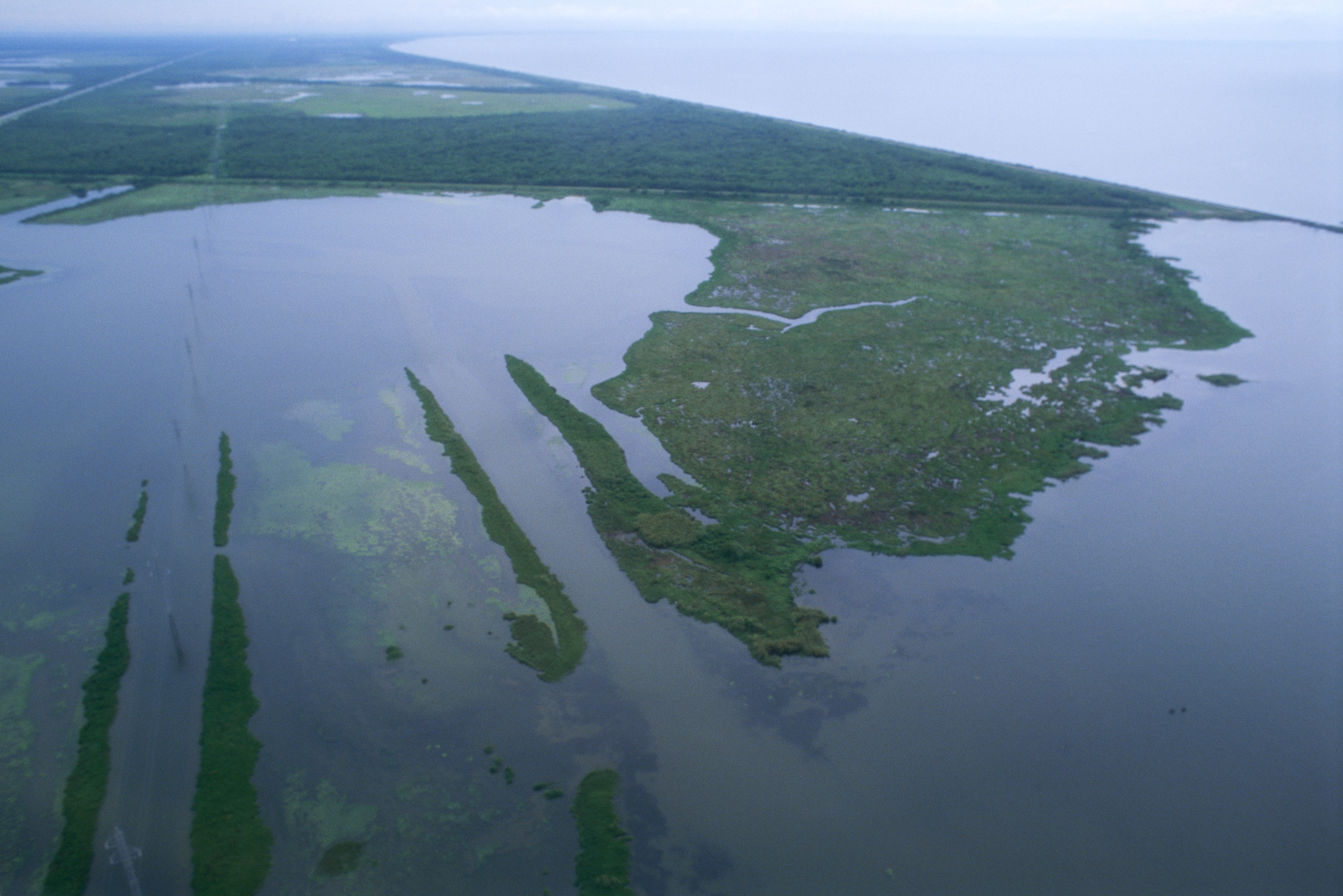
An aerial view of Louisiana's wetland habitats

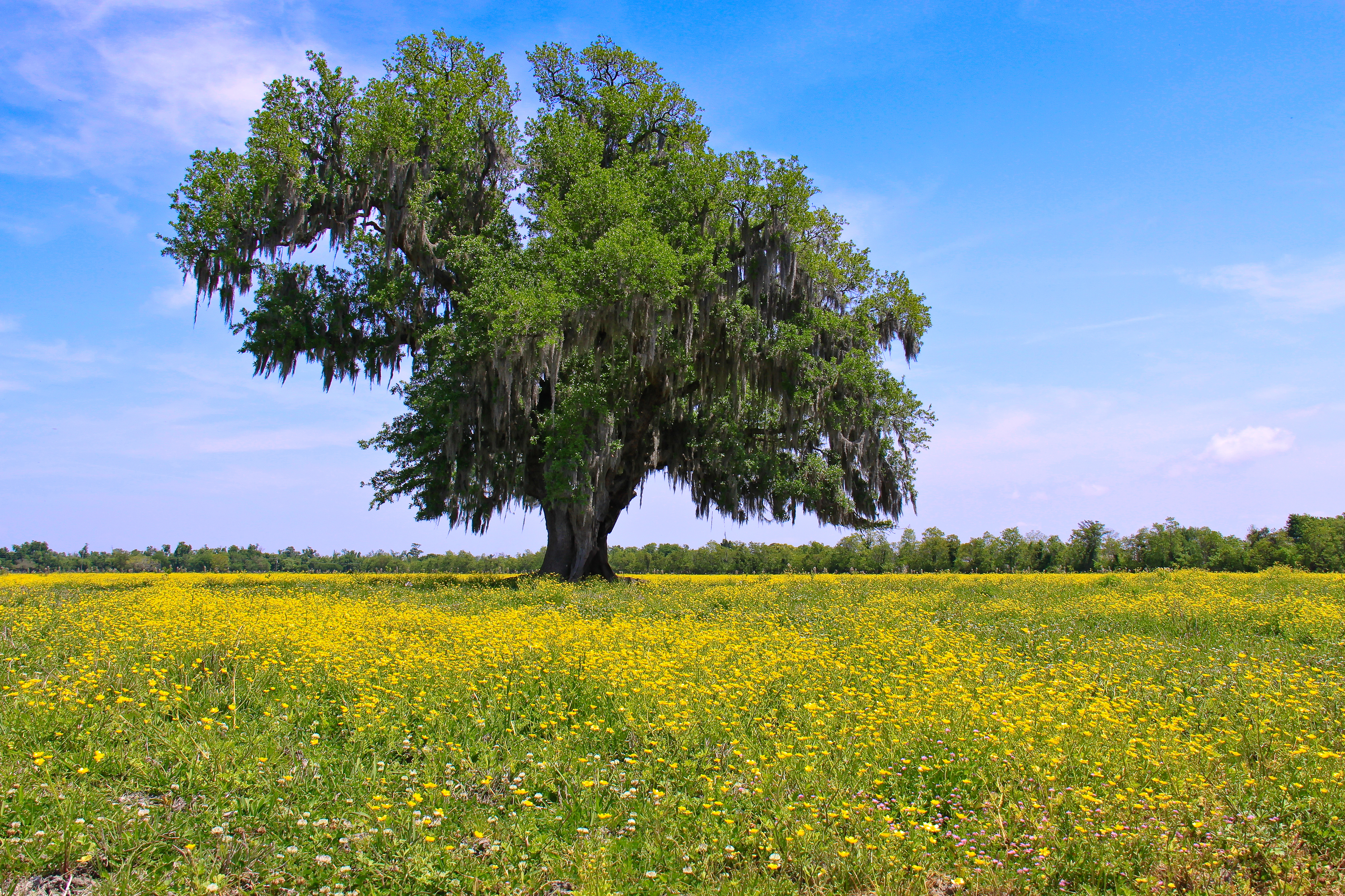
A field of yellow wildflowers in St. Bernard Parish

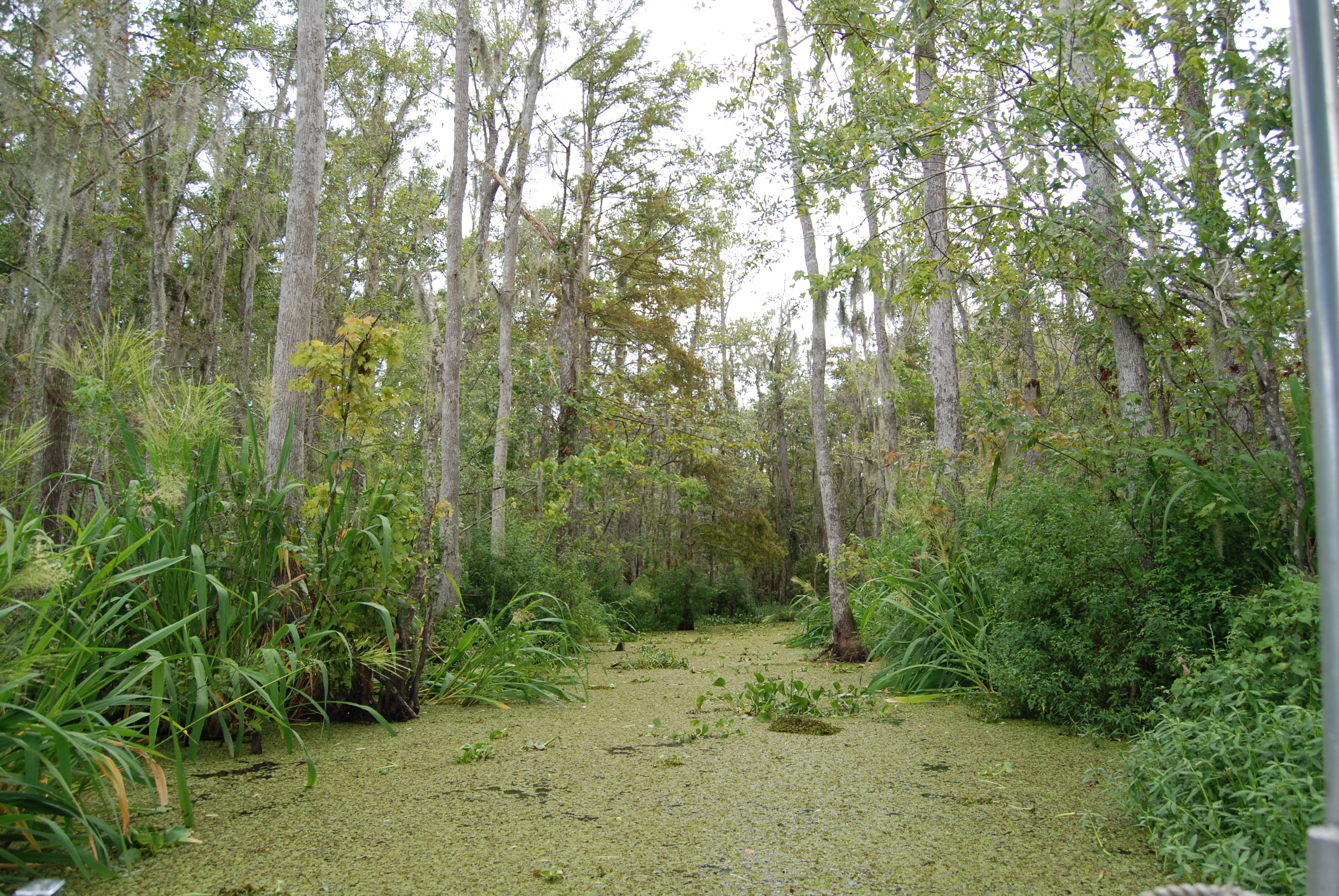
Honey Island Swamp

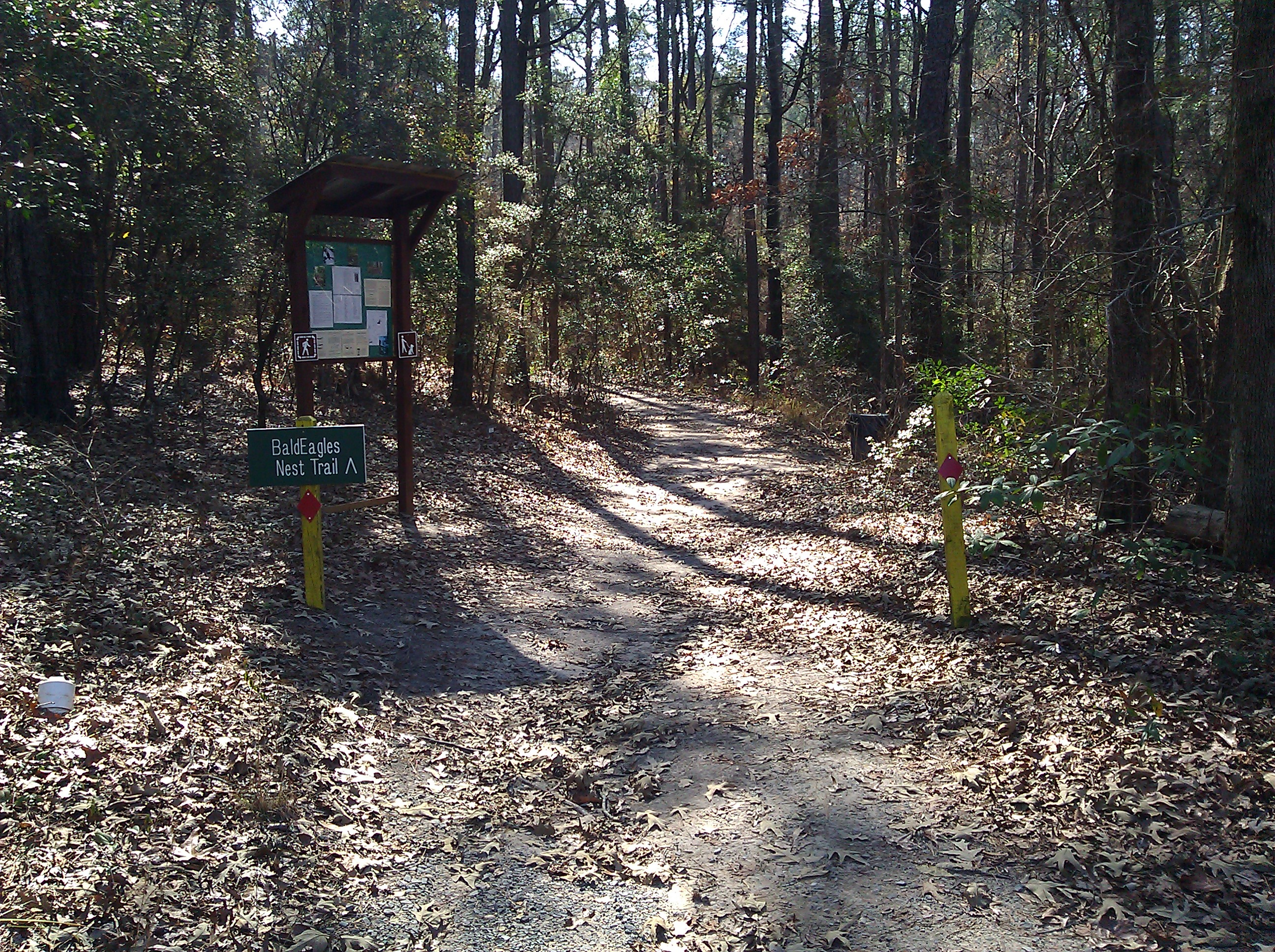
Entrance to the Bald Eagle Nest Trail at South Toledo Bend State Park

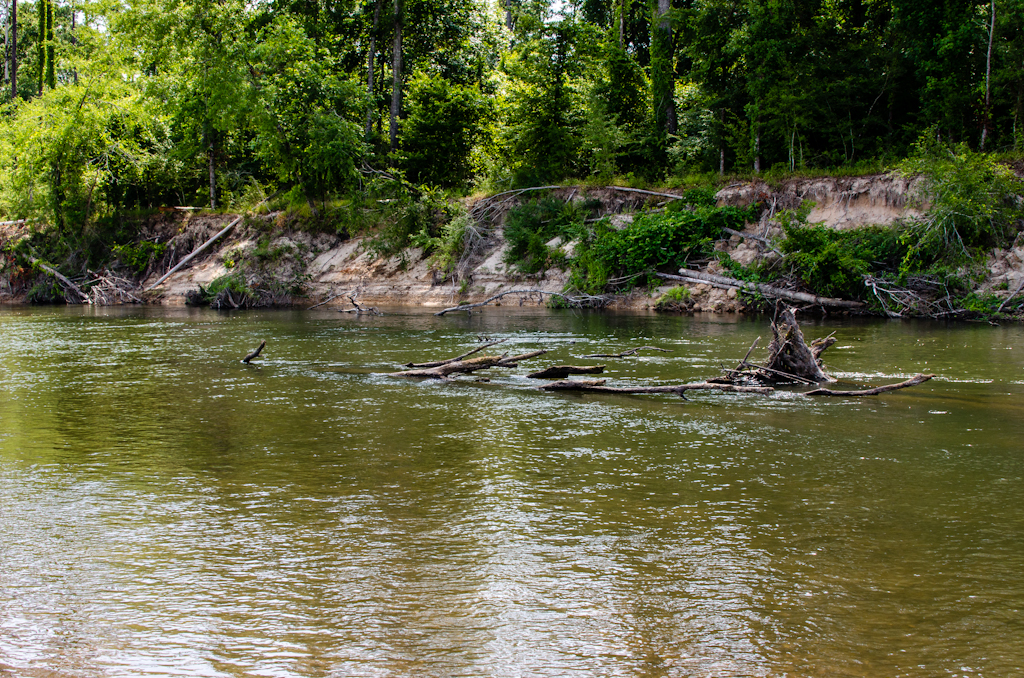
Bogue Chitto State Park

A map of Louisiana

Louisiana is bordered to the west by Texas; to the north by Arkansas; to the east by Mississippi; and to the south by the Gulf of Mexico. The state may properly be divided into two parts, the uplands of the north (the region of North Louisiana), and the alluvial along the coast (the Central Louisiana, Acadiana, Florida Parishes, and Greater New Orleans regions). The alluvial region includes low swamp lands, coastal marshlands and beaches, and barrier islands that cover about 12,350 square miles (32,000 km^{2}). This area lies principally along the Gulf of Mexico and the Mississippi River, which traverses the state from north to south for a distance of about 600 mi (970 km) and empties into the Gulf of Mexico; also in the state are the Red River; the Ouachita River and its branches; and other minor streams (some of which are called bayous).

The breadth of the alluvial region along the Mississippi is 10–60 miles (16–97 km), and along the other rivers, the alluvial region averages about 10 miles (16 km) across. The Mississippi River flows along a ridge formed by its natural deposits (known as a levee), from which the lands decline toward a river beyond at an average fall of six feet per mile (1 m/km). The alluvial lands along other streams present similar features.

The higher and contiguous hill lands of the north and northwestern part of the state have an area of more than 25,000 square miles (65,000 km^{2}). They consist of prairie and woodlands. The elevations above sea level range from 10 feet (3 m) at the coast and swamp lands to 50–60 feet (15–18 m) at the prairie and alluvial lands. In the uplands and hills, the elevations rise to Driskill Mountain, the highest point in the state only 535 feet (163 m) above sea level. From 1932 to 2010 the state lost 1,800 square miles due to rises in sea level and erosion. The Louisiana Coastal Protection and Restoration Authority (CPRA) spends around $1 billion per year to help shore up and protect Louisiana shoreline and land in both federal and state funding.

Besides the waterways named, there are the Sabine, forming the western boundary; and the Pearl, the eastern boundary; the Calcasieu, the Mermentau, the Vermilion, Bayou Teche, the Atchafalaya, the Boeuf, Bayou Lafourche, the Courtableau River, Bayou D'Arbonne, the Macon River, the Tensas, Amite River, the Tchefuncte, the Tickfaw, the Natalbany River, and a number of other smaller streams, constituting a natural system of navigable waterways, aggregating over 4,000 miles (6,400 km) long.

The state also has political jurisdiction over the approximately 3-mile (4.8 km)-wide portion of subsea land of the inner continental shelf in the Gulf of Mexico. Through a peculiarity of the political geography of the United States, this is substantially less than the 9-mile (14 km)-wide jurisdiction of nearby states Texas and Florida, which, like Louisiana, have extensive Gulf coastlines.

The southern coast of Louisiana in the United States is among the fastest-disappearing areas in the world. This has largely resulted from human mismanagement of the coast (see Wetlands of Louisiana). At one time, the land was added to when spring floods from the Mississippi River added sediment and stimulated marsh growth; the land is now shrinking. There are multiple causes.

Artificial levees block spring flood water that would bring fresh water and sediment to marshes. Swamps have been extensively logged, leaving canals and ditches that allow salt water to move inland. Canals dug for the oil and gas industry also allow storms to move sea water inland, where it damages swamps and marshes. Rising sea waters have exacerbated the problem. Some researchers estimate that the state is losing a landmass equivalent to 30 football fields every day. There are many proposals to save coastal areas by reducing human damage, including restoring natural floods from the Mississippi. Without such restoration, coastal communities will continue to disappear. And as the communities disappear, more and more people are leaving the region. Since the coastal wetlands support an economically important coastal fishery, the loss of wetlands is adversely affecting this industry.

The Gulf of Mexico 'dead zone' off the coast of Louisiana is the largest recurring hypoxic zone in the United States. It was 8,776 square miles (22,730 km^{2}) in 2017, the largest ever recorded.

=== Geology ===
The oldest rocks in Louisiana are exposed in the north, in areas such as the Kisatchie National Forest. The oldest rocks date back to the early Cenozoic Era, some 60 million years ago. The youngest parts of the state were formed during the last 12,000 years as successive deltas of the Mississippi River: the Maringouin, Teche, St. Bernard, Lafourche, the modern Mississippi, and now the Atchafalaya. The sediments were carried from north to south by the Mississippi River.

Between the tertiary rocks of the north, and the relatively new sediments along the coast, is a vast belt known as the Pleistocene Terraces. Their age and distribution can be largely related to the rise and fall of sea levels during past ice ages. The northern terraces have had sufficient time for rivers to cut deep channels, while the newer terraces tend to be much flatter.

Salt domes are also found in Louisiana. Their origin can be traced back to the early Gulf of Mexico when the shallow ocean had high rates of evaporation. There are several hundred salt domes in the state; one of the most familiar is Avery Island, Louisiana. Salt domes are important not only as a source of salt; they also serve as underground traps for oil and gas.

=== Climate ===
Louisiana has a humid subtropical climate (Köppen climate classification Cfa), with long, hot, humid summers and short, mild winters. The subtropical characteristics of the state are due to its low latitude, low lying topography, and the influence of the Gulf of Mexico, which at its farthest point is no more than 200 mi (320 km) away.

Rain is frequent throughout the year. April to September is slightly wetter than the rest of the year, which is the state's wet season. There is a dip in precipitation in October. In summer, thunderstorms build during the heat of the day and bring intense but brief, tropical downpours. In winter, rainfall is more frontal and less intense.

Summers in southern Louisiana have high temperatures from June to September averaging 90 °F (32 °C) or more, and overnight lows averaging above 70 °F (21 °C). At times, temperatures in the 90s °F (32–37 °C), combined with dew points in the upper 70s °F (24–26 °C), create sensible temperatures over 120 °F (49 °C). The humid, thick, jungle-like heat in southern Louisiana is a famous subject of countless stories and movies.

Temperatures are generally warm in the winter in southern Louisiana, with highs around New Orleans, Baton Rouge, the rest of southern Louisiana, and the Gulf of Mexico averaging 66 °F (19 °C). Northern Louisiana is mildly cool in the winter, with highs averaging 59 °F (15 °C). The overnight lows in the winter average well above freezing throughout Louisiana, with 46 °F (8 °C) the average near the Gulf and an average low of 37 °F (3 °C) in the winter in northern Louisiana.

On occasion, cold fronts from low-pressure centers to the north, reach Louisiana in winter. Low temperatures near 20 °F (−7 °C) occur on occasion in northern Louisiana but rarely do so in southern Louisiana. Snow is rare near the Gulf of Mexico. Residents in northern Louisiana might receive a dusting of snow a few times each decade. Louisiana's highest recorded temperature is 114 °F (46 °C) in Plain Dealing on August 10, 1936. The coldest recorded temperature was −16 °F (−27 °C) at Minden on February 13, 1899.

Louisiana is often affected by tropical cyclones and is very vulnerable to strikes by major hurricanes, particularly the lowlands around and in the New Orleans area. The unique geography of the region, with the many bayous, marshes and inlets, can result in water damage across a wide area from major hurricanes. The area is prone to frequent thunderstorms, especially in the summer.

Louisiana averages over 60 days of thunderstorms a year, more than any other state except Florida. Louisiana averages 27 tornadoes annually. The entire state is vulnerable to a tornado strike, with the extreme southern portion of Louisiana slightly less so than the rest of the state. Tornadoes are more common from January to March in southern Louisiana, and from February to March in northern Louisiana. Louisiana is partially within the area of tornado activity called Dixie Alley. Louisiana has tornadoes which tend to be unpredictable but localized.

Average temperatures in Louisiana (°F/°C)
	Jan	Feb	Mar	Apr	May	Jun	Jul	Aug	Sept	Oct	Nov	Dec	Annual
Shreveport	47.0/8.3	50.8/10.4	58.1/14.5	65.5/18.6	73.4/23.0	80.0/26.7	83.2/28.4	83.3/28.5	77.1/25.1	66.6/19.2	56.6/13.7	48.3/9.1	65.9/18.8
Monroe	46.3/7.9	50.3/10.2	57.8/14.3	65.6/18.7	73.9/23.3	80.4/26.9	82.8/28.2	82.5/28.1	76.5/24.7	66.0/18.9	56.3/13.5	48.0/8.9	65.5/18.6
Alexandria	48.5/9.2	52.1/11.2	59.3/15.2	66.4/19.1	74.5/23.6	80.7/27.1	83.2/28.4	83.2/28.4	78.0/25.6	68.0/20.0	58.6/14.8	50.2/10.1	66.9/19.4
Lake Charles	51.8/11.0	55.0/12.8	61.4/16.3	68.1/20.1	75.6/24.2	81.1/27.3	82.9/28.3	83.0/28.3	78.7/25.9	70.1/21.2	61.1/16.2	53.8/12.1	68.6/20.3
Lafayette	51.8/11.0	55.2/12.9	61.5/16.4	68.3/20.2	75.9/24.4	81.0/27.2	82.8/28.2	82.9/28.3	78.5/25.8	69.7/20.9	61.0/16.1	53.7/12.1	68.5/20.3
Baton Rouge	51.3/10.7	54.6/12.6	61.1/16.2	67.6/19.8	75.2/24.0	80.7/27.1	82.5/28.1	82.5/28.1	78.1/25.6	68.9/20.5	60.0/15.6	52.9/11.6	68.0/20.0
New Orleans	54.3/12.4	57.6/14.2	63.6/17.6	70.1/21.2	77.5/25.3	82.4/28.0	84.0/28.9	84.1/28.9	80.2/26.8	72.2/22.3	63.5/17.5	56.2/13.4	70.3/21.3

=== Publicly owned land ===
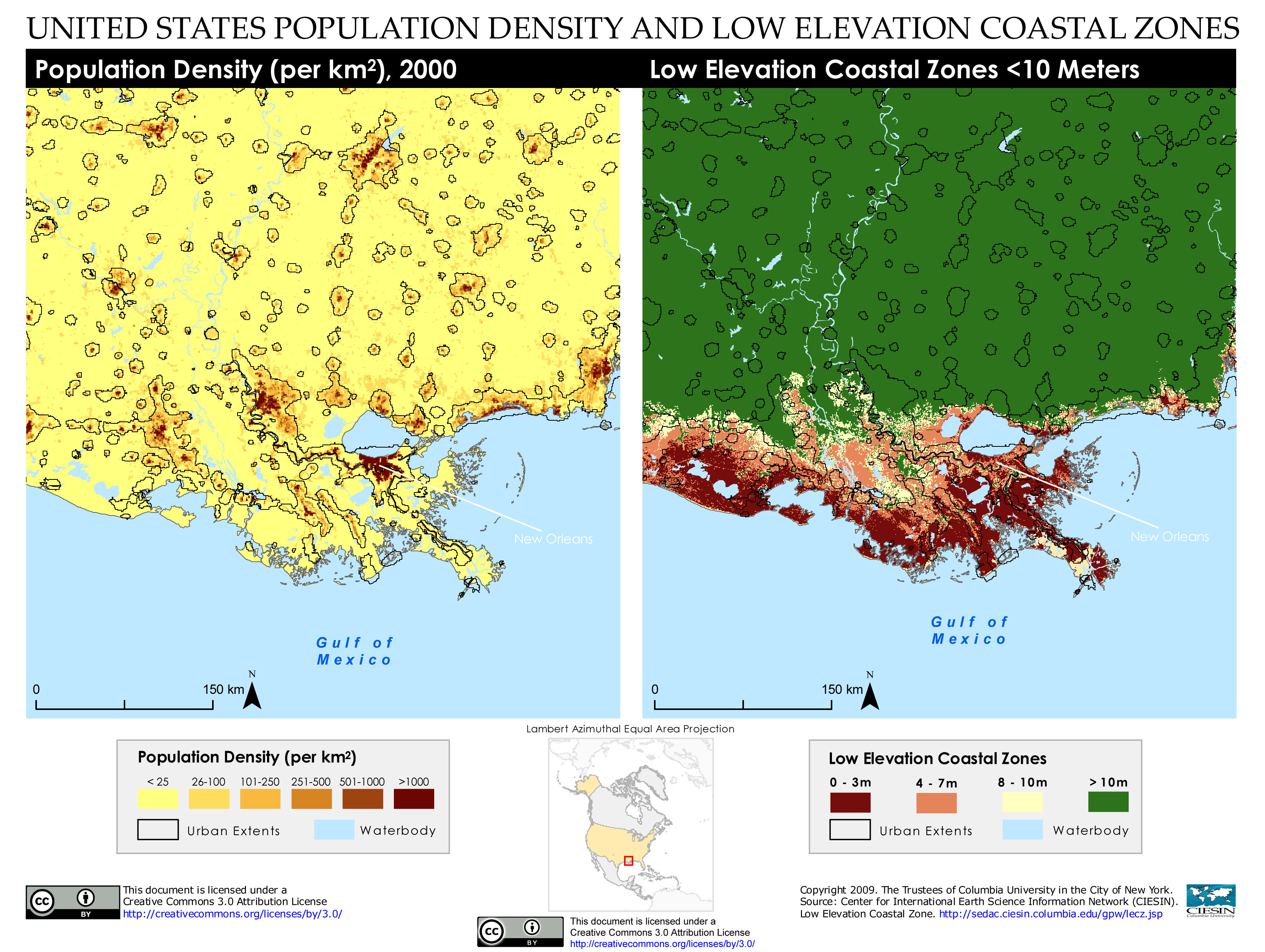
Population density in 2000 and low elevation coastal zones in the Mississippi River Delta. The Mississippi River Delta is especially vulnerable to sea level rise.

Owing to its location and geology, the state has high biological diversity. Some vital areas, such as southwestern prairie, have experienced a loss in excess of 98 percent. The pine flatwoods are also at great risk, mostly from fire suppression and urban sprawl. There is not yet a properly organized system of natural areas to represent and protect Louisiana's biological diversity. Such a system would consist of a protected system of core areas linked by biological corridors, such as Florida is planning.

Louisiana contains a number of areas which, to varying degrees, prevent people from using them. In addition to National Park Service areas and a United States National Forest, Louisiana operates a system of state parks, state historic sites, one state preservation area, one state forest, and many Wildlife Management Areas.

One of Louisiana's largest government-owned areas is Kisatchie National Forest. It is some 600,000 acres in area, more than half of which is flatwoods vegetation, which supports many rare plant and animal species. These include the Louisiana pinesnake and red-cockaded woodpecker. The system of government-owned cypress swamps around Lake Pontchartrain is another large area, with southern wetland species including egrets, alligators, and sturgeon.

At least 12 core areas would be needed to build a "protected areas system" for Louisiana. These would range from southwestern prairies, to the Pearl River Floodplain in the east, to the Mississippi River alluvial swamps in the north. Louisiana operates a system of 22 state parks, 17 state historic sites and one state preservation area. In these lands, Louisiana maintains a diversity of fauna and flora.

==== National Park Service ====
Historic or scenic areas managed, protected, or recognized by the National Park Service include:

- Atchafalaya National Heritage Area in Ascension Parish;
- Cane River National Heritage Area near Natchitoches;
- Cane River Creole National Historical Park near Natchitoches;
- Jean Lafitte National Historical Park and Preserve, headquartered in New Orleans, with units in St. Bernard Parish, Barataria (Crown Point), and Acadiana (Lafayette);
- Poverty Point National Monument at Delhi, Louisiana; and
- Saline Bayou, a designated National Wild and Scenic River near Winn Parish in northern Louisiana.

==== U.S. Forest Service ====
- Kisatchie National Forest is Louisiana's only national forest. It includes more than 600,000 acres in central and northern Louisiana with large areas of flatwoods and longleaf pine forest.

=== Major cities ===
Louisiana contains 308 incorporated municipalities, consisting of four consolidated city-parishes, and 304 cities, towns, and villages. Louisiana's municipalities cover only 7.9% of the state's land mass but are home to 45.3% of its population. The majority of urban Louisianians live along the coast or in northern Louisiana. The oldest permanent settlement in the state is Nachitoches. Baton Rouge, the state capital, is the second-largest city in the state. The most populous city is New Orleans. As defined by the U.S. Census Bureau, Louisiana contains 10 metropolitan statistical areas. Major areas include Greater New Orleans, Greater Baton Rouge, Lafayette, Shreveport–Bossier City, and Slidell.

Largest cities or towns in Louisiana Source:
Rank	Name	Parish	Pop.
1	New Orleans	Orleans	383,997
2	Baton Rouge	East Baton Rouge	227,470
3	Shreveport	Caddo	187,593
4	Lafayette	Lafayette	121,374
5	Lake Charles	Calcasieu	84,872
6	Kenner	Jefferson	66,448
7	Bossier City	Bossier	62,701
8	Monroe	Ouachita	47,702
9	Alexandria	Rapides	45,275
10	Houma	Terrebonne	33,406

== Demographics ==
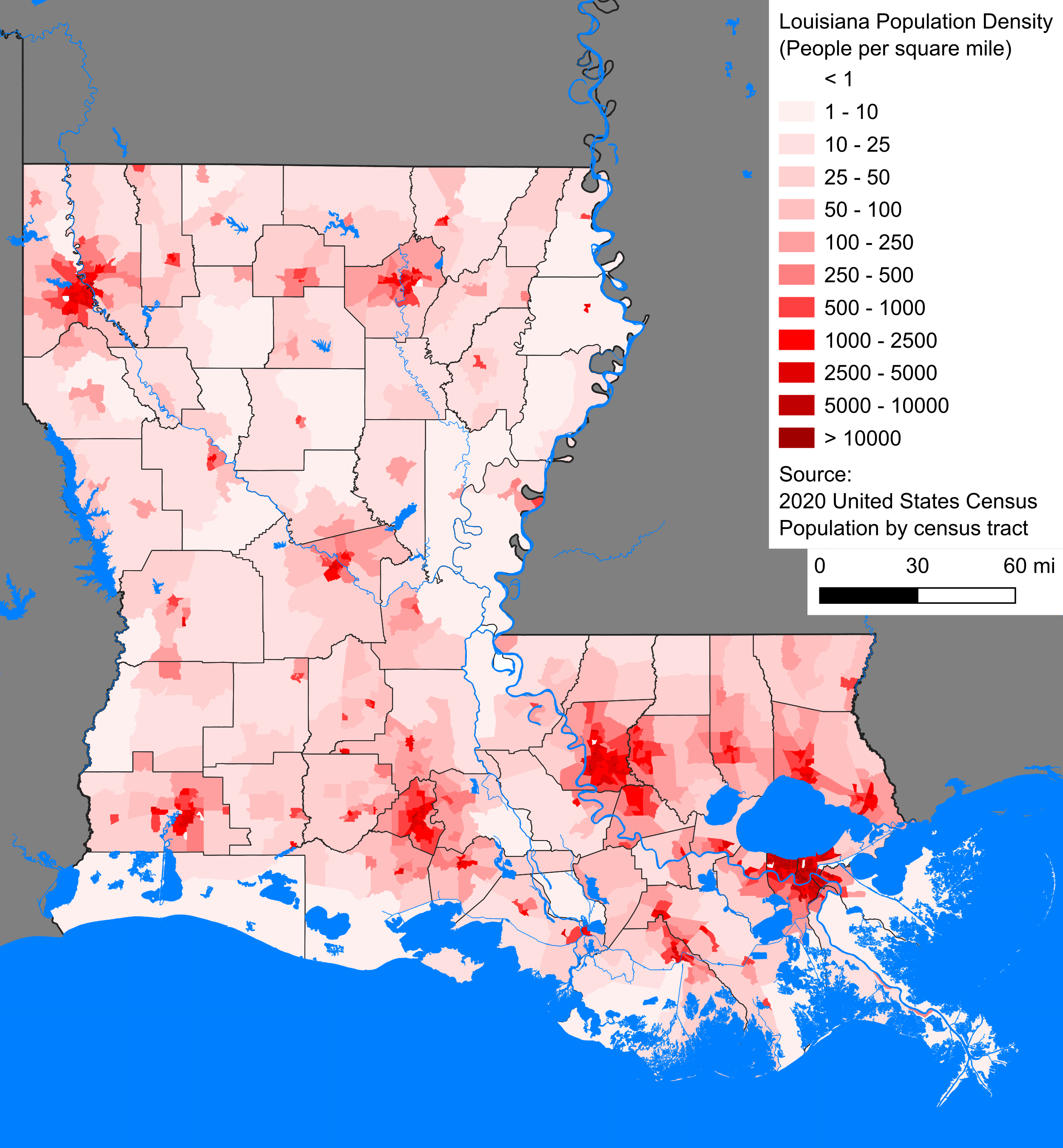
Louisiana's population density

Historical population
Census	Pop.	Note	%±
1810	76,556		—
1820	153,407		100.4%
1830	215,739		40.6%
1840	352,411		63.4%
1850	517,762		46.9%
1860	708,002		36.7%
1870	726,915		2.7%
1880	939,946		29.3%
1890	1,118,588		19.0%
1900	1,381,625		23.5%
1910	1,656,388		19.9%
1920	1,798,509		8.6%
1930	2,101,593		16.9%
1940	2,363,516		12.5%
1950	2,683,516		13.5%
1960	3,257,022		21.4%
1970	3,641,306		11.8%
1980	4,205,900		15.5%
1990	4,219,973		0.3%
2000	4,468,976		5.9%
2010	4,533,372		1.4%
2020	4,657,757		2.7%
2025 (est.)	4,618,189		−0.8%
Sources: 1910–2020

The majority of the state's population lives in southern Louisiana, spread throughout Greater New Orleans, the Florida Parishes, and Acadiana, while Central and North Louisiana have been stagnating and losing population. From the 2020 U.S. census, Louisiana had an apportioned population of 4,661,468. Its resident population was 4,657,757 as of 2020. In 2010, the state of Louisiana had a population of 4,533,372, up from 76,556 in 1810.

Despite historically positive trends of population growth leading up to the 2020 census, Louisiana began to experience population decline and stagnation since 2021, with Southwest Louisiana's Calcasieu and Cameron parishes losing more than 5% of their populations individually. Experiencing decline due to deaths and emigration to other states outpacing births and in-migration, Louisiana's 2022 census-estimated population was 4,590,241.

According to immigration statistics in 2019, approximately 4.2% of Louisianians were immigrants, while 2% were native-born U.S. citizens with at least one immigrant parent. The majority of Louisianian immigrants came from Honduras (18.8%), Mexico (13.6%), Vietnam (11.3%), Cuba (5.8%), and India (4.4%); an estimated 29.4% were undocumented immigrants. Its documented and undocumented population collectively paid $1.2 billion in taxes. New Orleans has been defined as a sanctuary city.

The population density of the state is 104.9 people per square mile. The center of population of Louisiana is located in Pointe Coupee Parish, in the city of New Roads. According to HUD's 2022 Annual Homeless Assessment Report, there were an estimated 7,373 homeless people in Louisiana.

In 2022, Louisiana had the highest percent of births to unmarried women of any US state, at 54.7 percent.

=== Race and ethnicity ===
Map of parishes in Louisiana by racial plurality, per the 2020 U.S. census Legend: | Non-Hispanic White 40–50% 50–60% 60–70% 70–80% 80–90% 90%+ | Black or African American 40–50% 50–60% 60–70% 70–80% |

Louisiana – racial and ethnic composition Note: the US Census Bureau treats Hispanic/Latino as an ethnic category. This table excludes Latinos from the racial categories and assigns them to a separate category. Hispanics/Latinos may be of any race.
Race / Ethnicity (NH = Non-Hispanic)	Pop 1980	Pop 1990	Pop 2000	Pop 2010	Pop 2020	% 1980	% 1990	% 2000	% 2010	% 2020
White alone (NH)	2,841,397	2,776,022	2,794,391	2,734,884	2,596,702	67.56%	65.78%	62.53%	60.33%	55.75%
Black or African American alone (NH)	1,223,552	1,291,470	1,443,390	1,442,420	1,452,420	29.09%	30.60%	32.30%	31.82%	31.18%
Native American or Alaska Native alone (NH)	11,748	17,539	24,129	28,092	25,994	0.28%	0.42%	0.54%	0.62%	0.56%
Asian alone (NH)	23,664	39,302	54,256	69,327	85,336	0.56%	0.93%	1.21%	1.53%	1.83%
Native Hawaiian or Pacific Islander alone (NH)	x	x	1,076	1,544	1,706	x	x	0.02%	0.03%	0.04%
Other race alone (NH)	6,405	2,596	4,736	6,779	16,954	0.15%	0.06%	0.11%	0.15%	0.36%
Mixed race or Multiracial (NH)	x	x	39,260	57,766	156,096	x	x	0.88%	1.27%	3.35%
Hispanic or Latino (any race)	99,134	93,044	107,738	192,560	322,549	2.36%	2.20%	2.41%	4.25%	6.92%
Total	4,205,900	4,219,973	4,468,976	4,533,372	4,657,757	100.00%	100.00%	100.00%	100.00%	100.00%

Several American Indian tribes such as the Atakapa and Caddo inhabited Louisiana before European colonization, concentrated along the Red River and Gulf of Mexico. At the beginning of French and Spanish colonization of Louisiana, white and black Americans began to move into the area. From French and Spanish rule in Louisiana, they were joined by Filipinos, Germans, and Spaniards both slave and free, who settled in enclaves within the Greater New Orleans region and Acadiana; some of the Spanish-descended communities became the Isleños of St. Bernard Parish.

By the 19th and 20th centuries, the state's most-populous racial and ethnic group fluctuated between white and black Americans; 47% of the population was black or African American in 1900. The black Louisianian population declined following migration to states including New York and California in efforts to flee Jim Crow regulations.

At the end of the 20th century, Louisiana's population has experienced diversification again, and its non-Hispanic or non-Latino American white population has been declining. Since 2020, the black or African American population have made up the largest non-white share of youths. Hispanic and Latino Americans have also increased as the second-largest racial and ethnic composition in the state, making up nearly 7% of Louisiana's population at the 2020 census. As of 2018, the largest single Hispanic and Latino American ethnicity were Mexican Americans (2.0%), followed by Puerto Ricans (0.3%) and Cuban Americans (0.2%). Other Hispanic and Latino Americans altogether made up 2.6% of Louisiana's Hispanic or Latino American population. The Asian American and multiracial communities have also experienced rapid growth, with many of Louisiana's multiracial population identifying as Cajun or Louisiana Creole.

At the 2019 American Community Survey, the largest ancestry groups of Louisiana were African American (31.4%), French (9.6%), German (6.2%), English (4.6%), Italian (4.2%), and Scottish (0.9%). African American and French heritage have been dominant since colonial Louisiana. As of 2011, 49.0% of Louisiana's population younger than age 1 were minorities.

=== Religion ===
Religion in Louisiana (2020)
Religion	Percent
Protestant	53%
Catholic	22%
Other Christian	1.5%
Unaffiliated	19%
Jewish	1%
Other faith	4%

As an ethnically and culturally diverse state, pre-colonial, colonial and present-day Louisianians have adhered to a variety of religions and spiritual traditions; pre-colonial and colonial Louisianian peoples practiced various Native American religions alongside Christianity through the establishment of Spanish and French missions; and other faiths including Haitian Vodou and Louisiana Voodoo were introduced to the state and are practiced to the present day. In the colonial and present-day U.S. state of Louisiana, Christianity grew to become its predominant religion, representing 84% of the adult population in 2014 and 76.5% in 2020, during two separate studies by the Pew Research Center and Public Religion Research Institute.

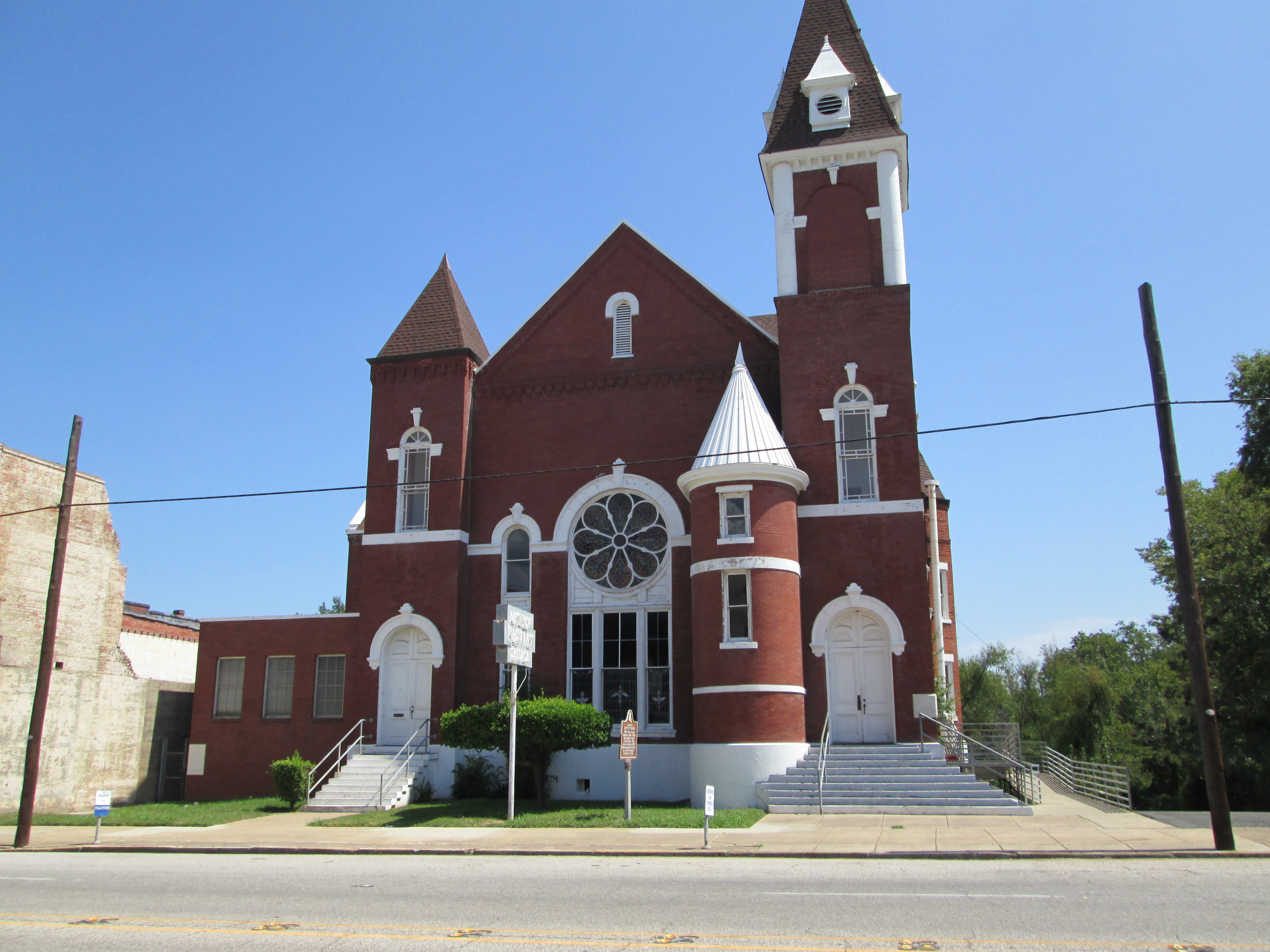
Antioch Baptist Church in Shreveport

Among its Christian population—and in common with other southern U.S. states—the majority, particularly in the north of the state, belong to various Protestant denominations. Protestantism was introduced to the state in the 1800s, with Baptists establishing two churches in 1812, followed by Methodists; Episcopalians first entered the state by 1805. Protestant Christians made up 57% of the state's adult population at the 2014 Pew Research Center study, and 53% at the 2020 Public Religion Research Institute's study. Protestants are concentrated in North Louisiana, Central Louisiana, and the northern tier of the Florida Parishes.

Because of French and Spanish heritage, and their descendants the Creoles, and later Irish, Italian, Portuguese and German immigrants, southern Louisiana and Greater New Orleans are predominantly Catholic in contrast; according to the 2020 Public Religion Research Institute study, 22% of the adult population were Catholic. Since Creoles were the first settlers, planters and leaders of the territory, they have traditionally been well represented in politics; for instance, most of the early governors were Creole Catholics, instead of Protestants. As Catholics continue to constitute a significant fraction of Louisiana's population, they have continued to be influential in state politics. The high proportion and influence of the Catholic population makes Louisiana distinct among southern states. (Note: Other Southern states have longstanding indigenous Catholic populations, and Florida's largely Catholic population of Cuban emigres has been influential since the 1960s. Yet, Louisiana is still unusual or exceptional in its extent of aboriginal Catholic settlement and influence. Among states in the Deep South (discounting Florida's Panhandle and much of Texas) the historic role of Catholicism in Louisiana is unparalleled and unique. Among the states of the Union, Louisiana's unique use of the term parish (French la parouche or "la paroisse") for county is rooted in the pre-statehood role of Catholic church parishes in the administration of government.) The Roman Catholic Archdiocese of New Orleans, Diocese of Baton Rouge, and Diocese of Lafayette in Louisiana are the largest Catholic jurisdictions in the state, located within the Greater New Orleans, Greater Baton Rouge, and Lafayette metropolitan statistical areas.

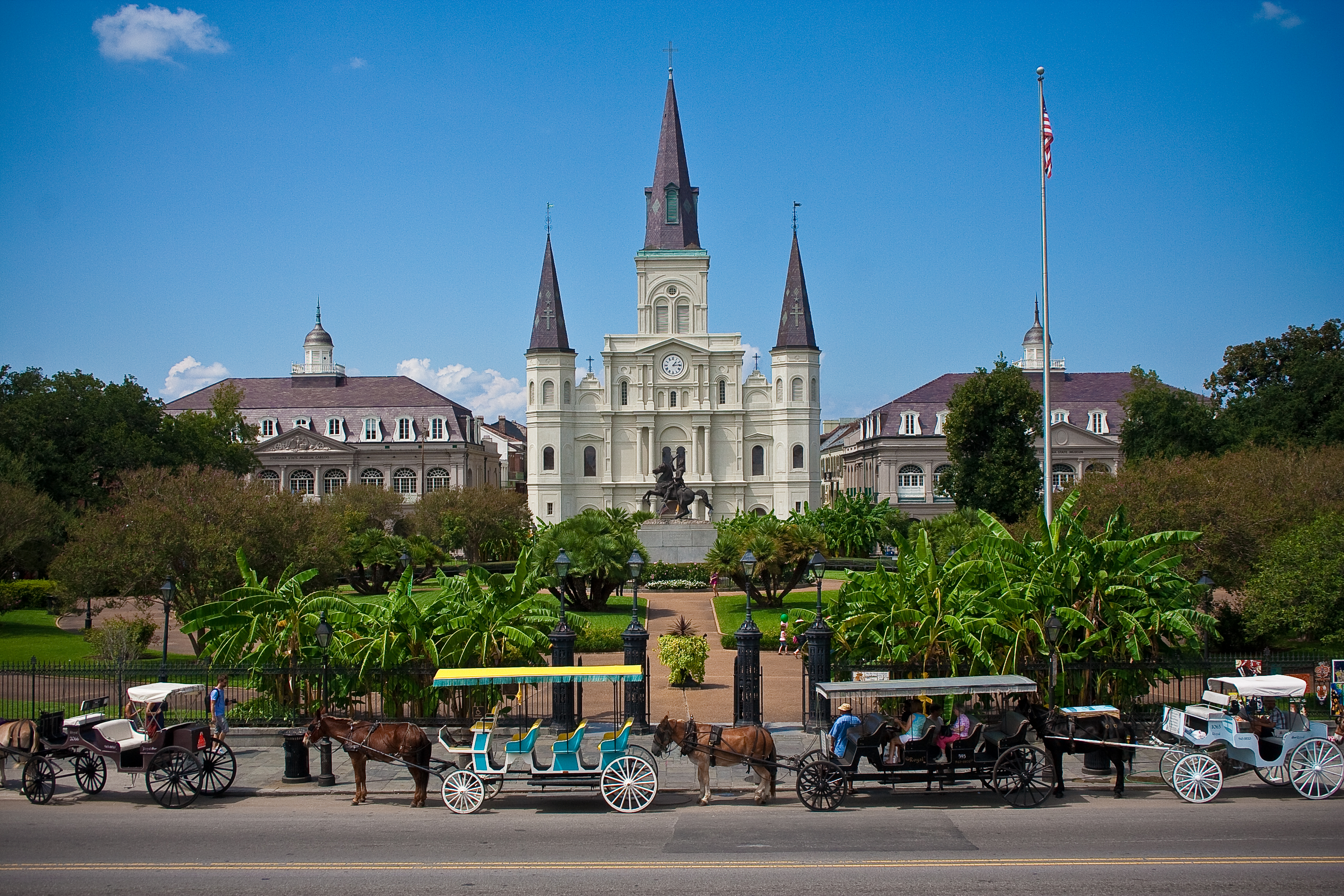
Cathedral Basilica of St. Louis in New Orleans

Louisiana was among the southern states with a significant Jewish population before the 20th century; Virginia, South Carolina, and Georgia also had influential Jewish populations in some of their major cities from the 18th and 19th centuries. The earliest Jewish colonists were Sephardic Jews who immigrated to the Thirteen Colonies. Later in the 19th century, German Jews began to immigrate, followed by those from eastern Europe and the Russian Empire in the late 19th and early 20th centuries. Jewish communities have been established in the state's larger cities, notably New Orleans and Baton Rouge. The most significant of these is the Jewish community of the New Orleans area. In 2000, before the 2005 Hurricane Katrina, its population was about 12,000. Dominant Jewish movements in the state include Orthodox and Reform Judaism; Reform Judaism was the largest Jewish tradition in the state according to the Association of Religion Data Archives in 2020, representing some 5,891 Jews. Prominent Jews in Louisiana's political leadership have included Whig (later Democrat) Judah P. Benjamin, who represented Louisiana in the U.S. Senate before the American Civil War and then became the Confederate secretary of state; Democrat-turned-Republican Michael Hahn who was elected as governor, serving 1864–1865 when Louisiana was occupied by the Union Army, and later elected in 1884 as a U.S. congressman; Democrat Adolph Meyer, Confederate Army officer who represented the state in the U.S. House of Representatives from 1891 until his death in 1908; Republican secretary of state Jay Dardenne, and Republican (Democrat before 2011) attorney general Buddy Caldwell.

Other non-Christian and non-Jewish religions with a continuous, historical presence in the state have been Islam, Buddhism and Hinduism. In the Shreveport–Bossier City metropolitan area, Muslims made up an estimated 14% of Louisiana's total Muslim population as of 2014. In 2020, the Association of Religion Data Archives estimated there were 24,732 Muslims living in the state. The largest Islamic denominations in the major metropolises of Louisiana were Sunni Islam, non-denominational Islam and Quranism, Shia Islam, and the Nation of Islam.

Among Louisiana's irreligious community, 2% affiliated with atheism and 13% claimed no religion as of 2014; an estimated 10% of the state's population practiced nothing in particular at the 2014 study. According to the Public Religion Research Institute in 2020, 19% were religiously unaffiliated.

== Economy ==
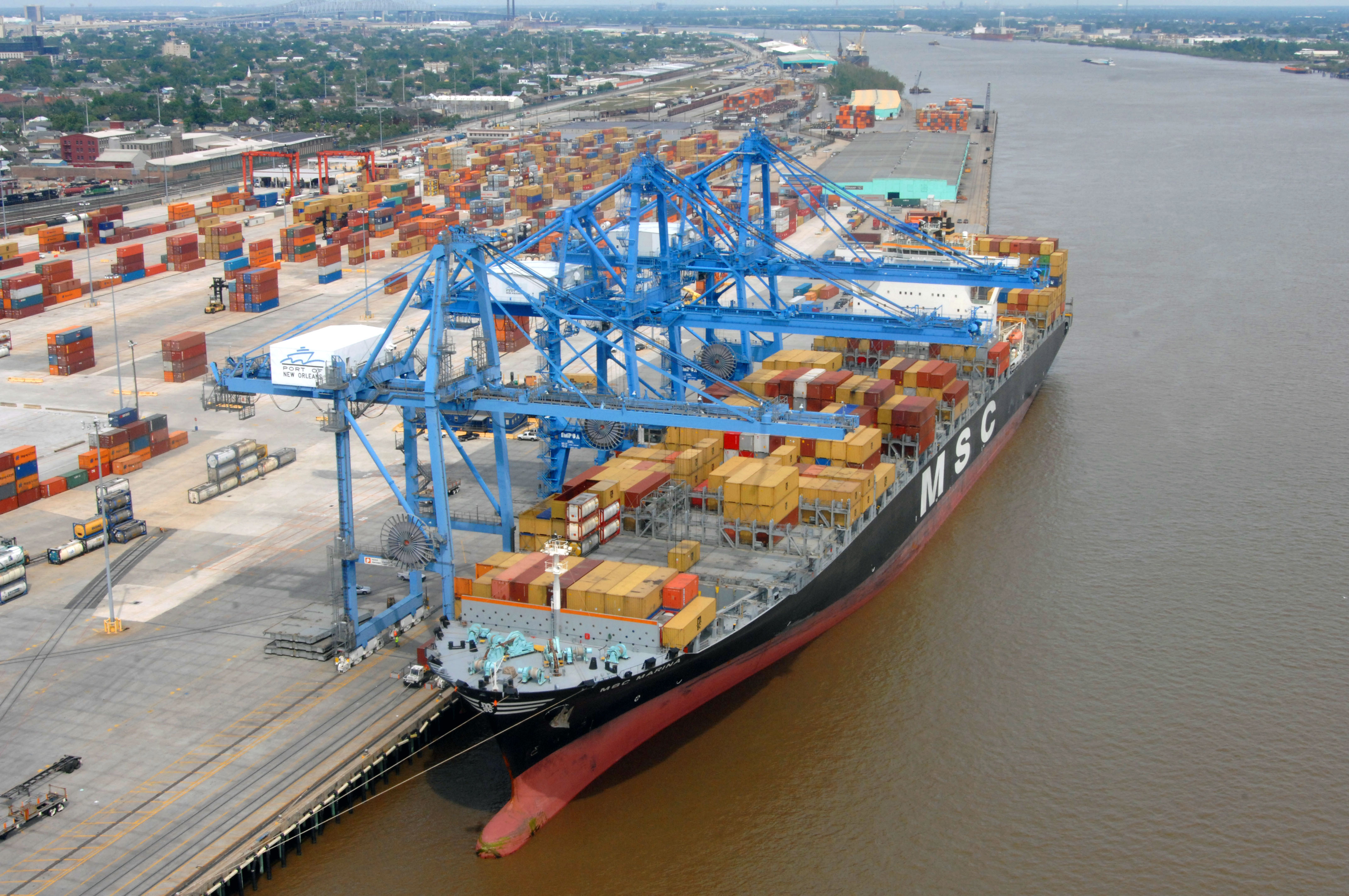
A cargo ship at the Port of New Orleans

Louisiana's population, agricultural products, abundance of oil and natural gas, and southern Louisiana's medical and technology corridors have contributed to its growing and diversifying economy. In 2014, Louisiana was ranked as one of the most small business friendly states. In 2025, 99.5% of businesses in Louisiana were small businesses and employed 54.1% of the state's work force.

Louisiana's principal agricultural products include seafood (it is the biggest producer of crawfish in the world, supplying approximately 90%), cotton, soybeans, cattle, sugarcane, poultry and eggs, dairy products, and rice. Among its energy and other industries, chemical products, petroleum and coal products, processed foods, transportation equipment, and paper products have contributed to a significant portion of the state's GSP. Tourism and gaming are also important elements in the economy, especially in Greater New Orleans.

In 2004, the Port of South Louisiana, on the Mississippi River between New Orleans and Baton Rouge, was the largest volume shipping port in the Western Hemisphere and 4th largest in the world, and the largest bulk cargo port in the U.S. The Port of South Louisiana continued to be the busiest port by tonnage in the U.S. to 2018. South Louisiana was number 15 among world ports in 2016.

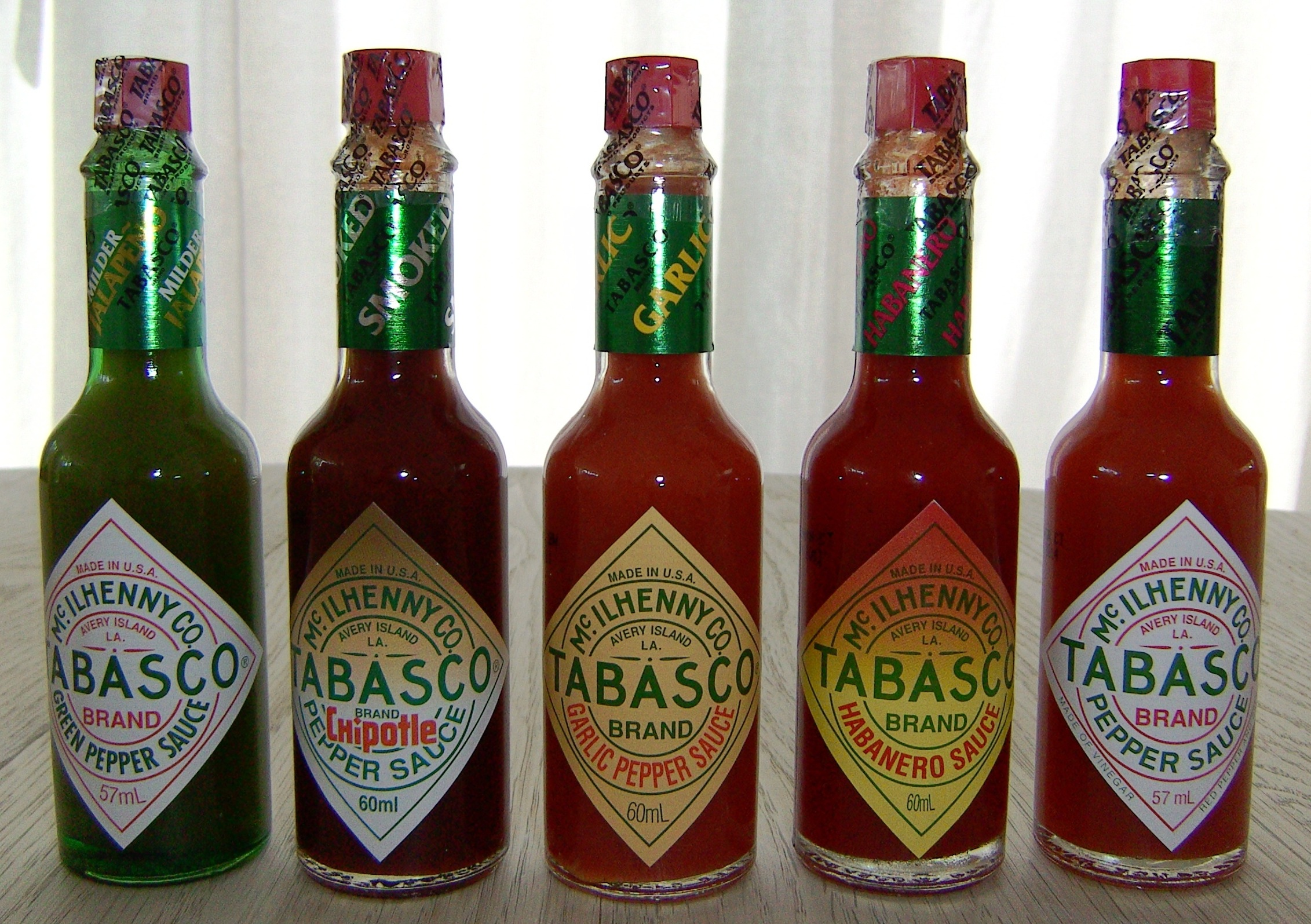
Tabasco varieties produced in Louisiana

New Orleans, Shreveport, and Baton Rouge are home to a thriving film industry. State financial incentives since 2002 and aggressive promotion have given Louisiana the nickname "Hollywood South". Because of its distinctive culture within the United States, only Alaska is Louisiana's rival in popularity as a setting for reality television programs. In late 2007 and early 2008, a 300,000-square-foot (28,000 m^{2}) film studio was scheduled to open in Tremé, with state-of-the-art production facilities, and a film training institute. Tabasco sauce, which is marketed by one of the United States' biggest producers of hot sauce, the McIlhenny Company, originated on Avery Island.

In 2025, Louisiana's gross state product was $340 billion. Louisiana's per capita personal income was $63,940 in 2025. In 2019, the median household income was $51,073, while the national average was $65,712. In August 2025, Louisiana's unemployment rate was 4.4%.

Louisiana has three personal income tax brackets, ranging from 2% to 6%. The state sales tax rate is 5% (effective January 1, 2025), and parishes can levy additional sales tax on top of this. Louisiana has a use tax, which includes 4% to be distributed to local governments. Property taxes are assessed and collected at the local level. Louisiana is a subsidized state, and Louisiana taxpayers receive more federal funding per dollar of federal taxes paid compared to the average state.

Per dollar of federal tax collected in 2005, Louisiana citizens received approximately $1.78 in the way of federal spending. This ranks the state fourth highest nationally and represents a rise from 1995 when Louisiana received $1.35 per dollar of taxes in federal spending (ranked seventh nationally). Neighboring states and the amount of federal spending received per dollar of federal tax collected were: Texas ($0.94), Arkansas ($1.41), and Mississippi ($2.02). Federal spending in 2005 and subsequent years since has been exceptionally high due to the recovery from Hurricane Katrina. Nearly a third of Louisianans are Medicaid recipients.

== Culture ==
Louisiana is home to many cultures; especially notable are the distinct cultures of the Louisiana Creoles and Cajuns, descendants of French and Spanish settlers in colonial Louisiana.

=== African culture ===
The French colony of La Louisiane struggled for decades to survive. Conditions were harsh, the climate and soil were unsuitable for certain crops the colonists knew, and they suffered from regional tropical diseases. Both colonists and the slaves they imported had high mortality rates. The settlers kept importing slaves, which resulted in a high proportion of native Africans from West Africa, who continued to practice their culture in new surroundings. As described by historian Gwendolyn Midlo Hall, they developed a marked Afro-Creole culture in the colonial era.

At the turn of the 18th century and in the early 1800s, New Orleans received a major influx of White and mixed-race refugees fleeing the violence of the Haitian Revolution, many of whom brought their slaves with them. This added another infusion of African culture to the city, as more slaves in Saint-Domingue were from Africa than in the United States. They strongly influenced the African-American culture of the city in terms of dance, music and religious practices.

=== Creole culture ===
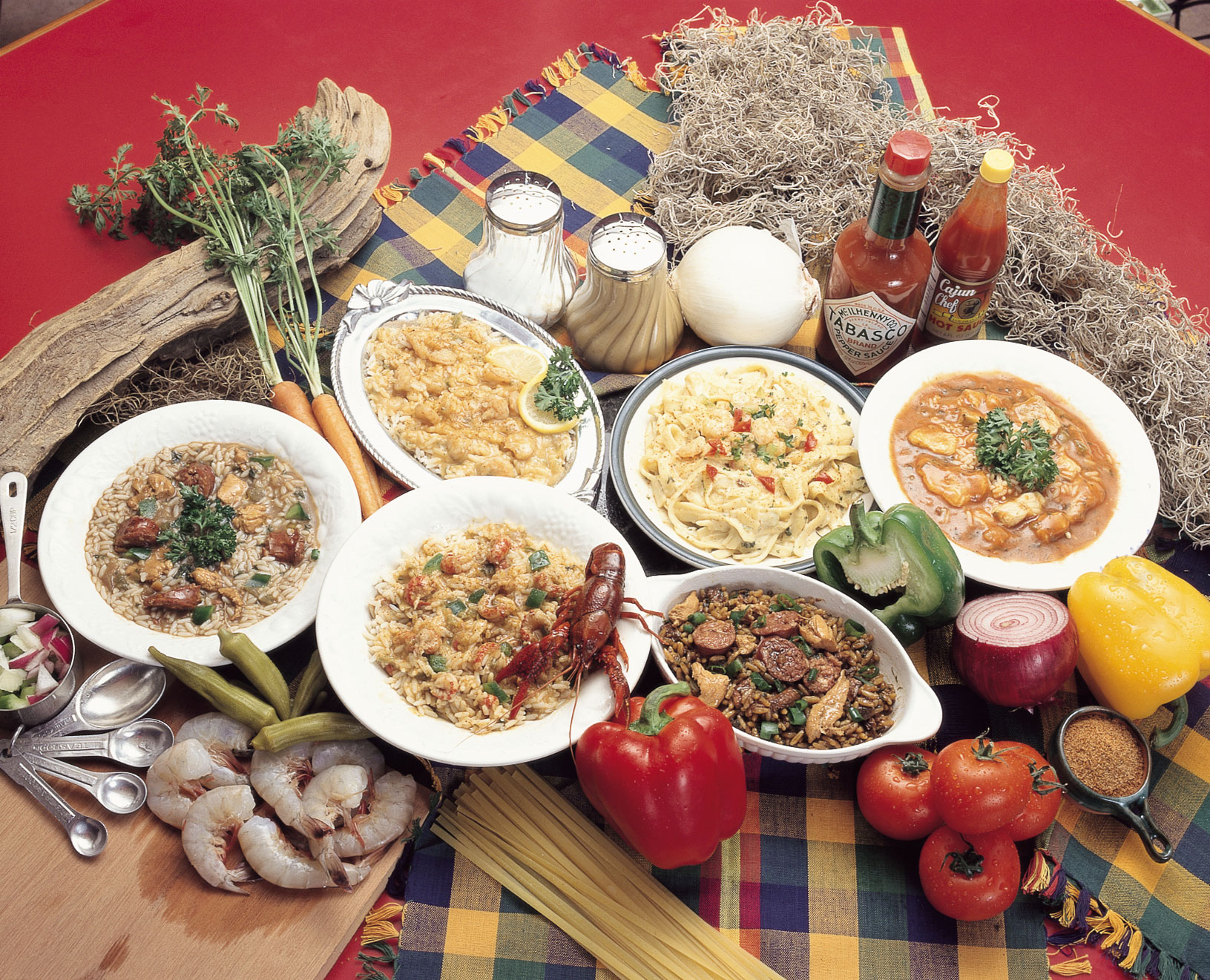
Typical dishes of Louisiana Creole cuisine

Creole culture is an amalgamation of French, African, Spanish (and other European), and Native American cultures. Creole comes from the Portuguese word crioulo; originally it referred to a colonist of European (specifically French) descent who was born in the New World, in comparison to immigrants from France. The oldest Louisiana manuscript to use the word "Creole", from 1782, applied it to a slave born in the French colony. But originally it referred more generally to the French colonists born in Louisiana.

Over time, there developed in the French colony a relatively large group of Creoles of Color (gens de couleur libres), who were primarily descended from African slave women and French men (later other Europeans became part of the mix, as well as some Native Americans). Often the French would free their concubines and mixed-race children, and pass on social capital to them. They might educate sons in France, for instance, and help them enter the French Army. They also settled capital or property on their mistresses and children. The free people of color gained more rights in the colony and sometimes education; they generally spoke French and were Roman Catholic. Many became artisans and property owners. Over time, the term "Creole" became associated with this class of Creoles of color, many of whom achieved freedom long before the American Civil War.

Wealthy French Creoles generally maintained town houses in New Orleans as well as houses on their large sugar plantations outside town along the Mississippi River. New Orleans had the largest population of free people of color in the region; they could find work there and created their own culture, marrying among themselves for decades.

=== Acadian culture ===
The ancestors of Cajuns immigrated mostly from west central France to New France, where they settled in the Atlantic provinces of New Brunswick, Nova Scotia and Prince Edward Island, known originally as the French colony of Acadia. After the British defeated France in the French and Indian War (Seven Years' War) in 1763, France ceded its territory east of the Mississippi River to Britain. After the Acadians refused to swear an oath of loyalty to the British Crown, they were expelled from Acadia, and made their way to places such as France, Britain, and New England.

Other Acadians covertly remained in British North America or moved to New Spain. Many Acadians settled in southern Louisiana in the region around Lafayette and the LaFourche Bayou country. They developed a distinct rural culture there, different from the French Creole colonists of New Orleans. Intermarrying with others in the area, they developed what was called Cajun music, cuisine and culture.

=== Isleño culture ===
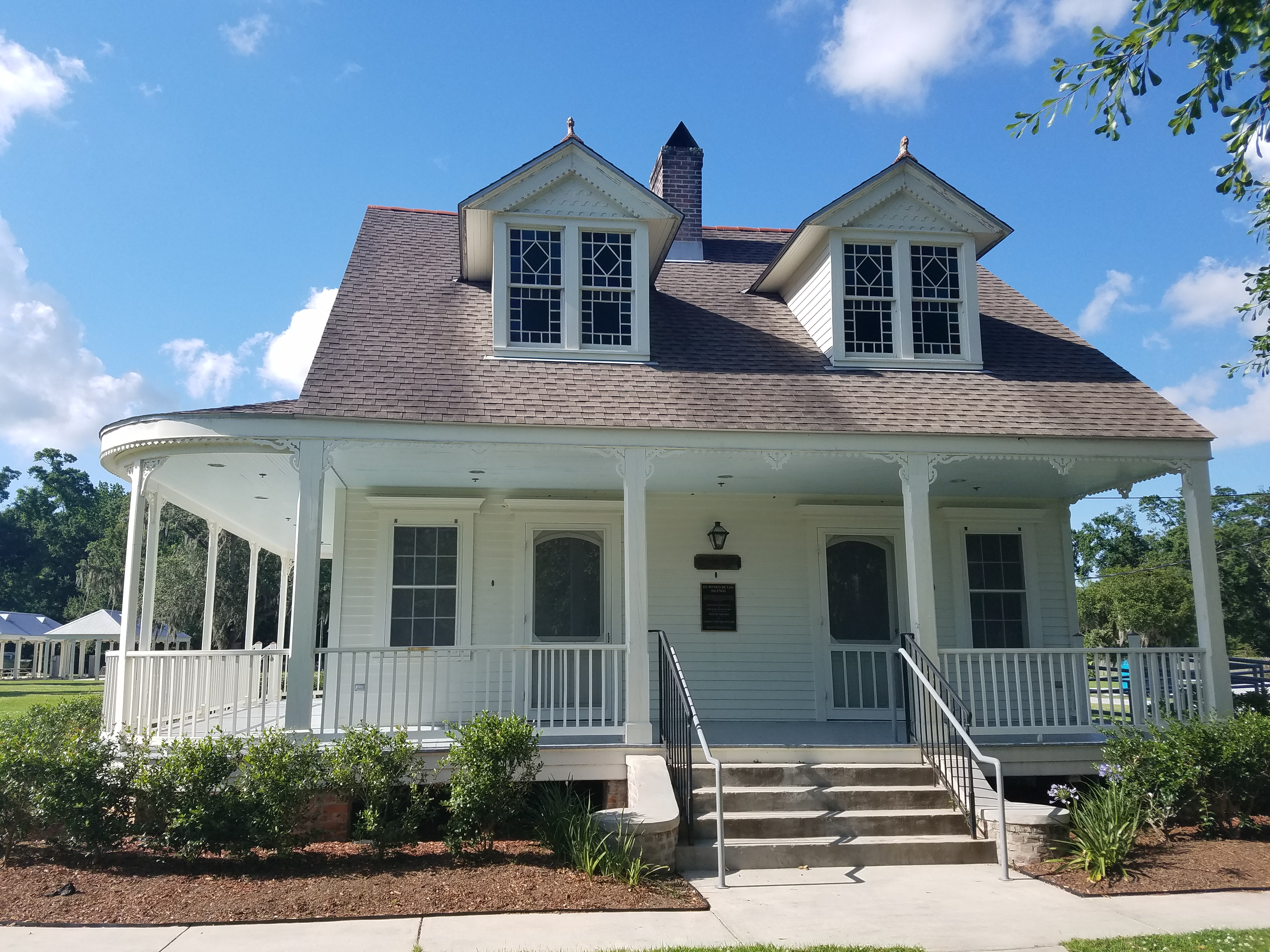
El Museo de los Isleños (Isleño Museum) in Saint Bernard

A third distinct culture in Louisiana is that of the Isleños. Its members are descendants of colonists from the Canary Islands who settled in Spanish Louisiana between 1778 and 1783 and intermarried with other communities such as Frenchmen, Acadians, Creoles, Spaniards, and other groups, mainly through the 19th and early 20th centuries.

In Louisiana, the Isleños originally settled in four communities which included Galveztown, Valenzuela, Barataria, and San Bernardo. The large migration of Acadian refugees to Bayou Lafourche led to the rapid gallicization of the Valenzuela community while the community of San Bernardo (Saint Bernard) was able to preserve much of its unique culture and language into the 21st century. The transmission of Spanish and other customs has completely halted in St. Bernard with those having competency in Spanish being octogenarians.

Through the centuries, the various Isleño communities of Louisiana have kept alive different elements of their Canary Islander heritage while also adopting and building upon the customs and traditions of the communities that surround them. Today two heritage associates exist for the communities: Los Isleños Heritage and Cultural Society of St. Bernard as well as the Canary Islanders Heritage Society of Louisiana. The Fiesta de los Isleños is celebrated annually in St. Bernard Parish which features heritage performances from local groups and the Canary Islands.

== Education ==
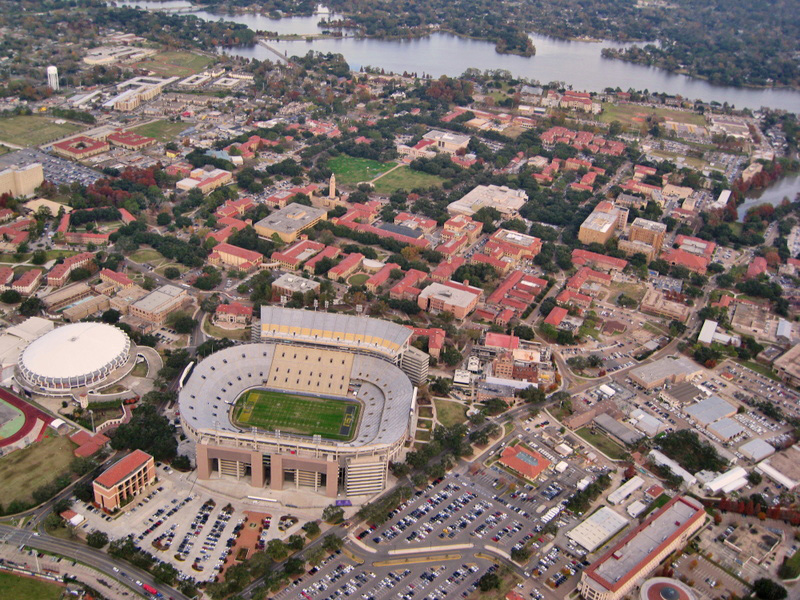
Aerial view of Louisiana State University's flagship campus

Despite ranking as the third-least educated state as of 2023, preceded by Mississippi and West Virginia, Louisiana is home to over 40 public and private colleges and universities including: Louisiana State University in Baton Rouge; Louisiana Tech University in Ruston, the University of Louisiana at Lafayette in Lafayette; and Tulane University in New Orleans. Louisiana State University is the largest and most comprehensive university in the state. Louisiana Tech University is one of the most well regarded public universities in the state. The University of Louisiana at Lafayette, the second-largest institution in the state, became the third university in the state to achieve R1: Doctoral universities – very high research activity status in December 2021. Tulane University is a major private research university and the wealthiest university in Louisiana with an endowment over $2 billion in 2023. Tulane is also highly regarded for its academics nationwide, consistently ranked in the top 100 on U.S. News & World Report's list of best national universities.

Louisiana's two largest historically black colleges and universities (HBCUs) are Southern University in Baton Rouge and Grambling State University in Grambling. Both these Southwestern Athletic Conference (SWAC) schools compete against each other in football annually in the much anticipated and nationally televised Bayou Classic during Thanksgiving weekend in the Superdome.

While Louisiana has historically struggled to improve its test scores nationwide, recent improvements in policy and practice have led to substantial growth. In 2000, of all of the states, Louisiana had the highest percentage of students in private schools. Danielle Dreilinger of The Times Picayune wrote in 2014 that "Louisiana parents have a national reputation for favoring private schools." The number of students in enrolled in private schools in Louisiana declined by 9% from c. 2000–2005 until 2014, due to the proliferation of charter schools, the Great Recession and Hurricane Katrina. Ten parishes in the Baton Rouge and New Orleans area had a combined 17% decline in private school enrollment in that period. This prompted private schools to lobby for school vouchers.

Louisiana's school voucher program is known as the Louisiana Scholarship Program. It was available in the New Orleans area beginning in 2008 and in the rest of the state beginning in 2012. In 2013, the number of students using school vouchers to attend private schools was 6,751, and for 2014 it was projected to exceed 8,800. As per a ruling from Ivan Lemelle, a U.S. district judge, the federal government has the right to review the charter school placements to ensure they do not further racial segregation.

== Transportation ==
The Louisiana Department of Transportation and Development is the state government organization in charge of maintaining public transportation, roadways, bridges, canals, select levees, floodplain management, port facilities, commercial vehicles, and aviation which includes 69 airports.

=== Roads ===
==== Interstate highways ====
- I-10
  - I-110
  - I-210
  - I-310
  - I-510
  - I-610
  - I-910 (unsigned)
- I-12
- I-20
  - I-220
- I-49
- I-55
- I-59
- Future I-69

==== United States highways ====
- US 11
- US 51
- US 61
- US 63
- US 65
  - US 165
- US 167
- US 71
  - US 171
  - US 371
- US 79
- US 80
- US 84
- US 90
  - US 190
- US 425

In 2022, Louisiana ranked 5th highest for fatal crashes in the US with a rate of 19.7 deaths per 100,000 population.

=== Rail ===
Six Class I freight railroads operate in Louisiana: BNSF, Canadian National, CPKC, CSX, Norfolk Southern and Union Pacific. A number of Class II and Class III railroads also carry freight.

Amtrak, the national passenger railroad, operates three long-distance rail routes through Louisiana. All three originate at New Orleans Union Passenger Terminal. The Crescent serves Slidell then runs northeast to New York via Birmingham, Atlanta, Charlotte, and Washington, D.C. The City of New Orleans stops at Hammond before continuing north to Chicago by way of Jackson and Memphis. The Sunset Limited serves Schriever, New Iberia, Lafayette, and Lake Charles on its route west to Los Angeles via Houston, San Antonio, El Paso, and Tucson. Before Hurricane Katrina, the Sunset Limited ran as far east as Orlando.

=== Mass transit ===
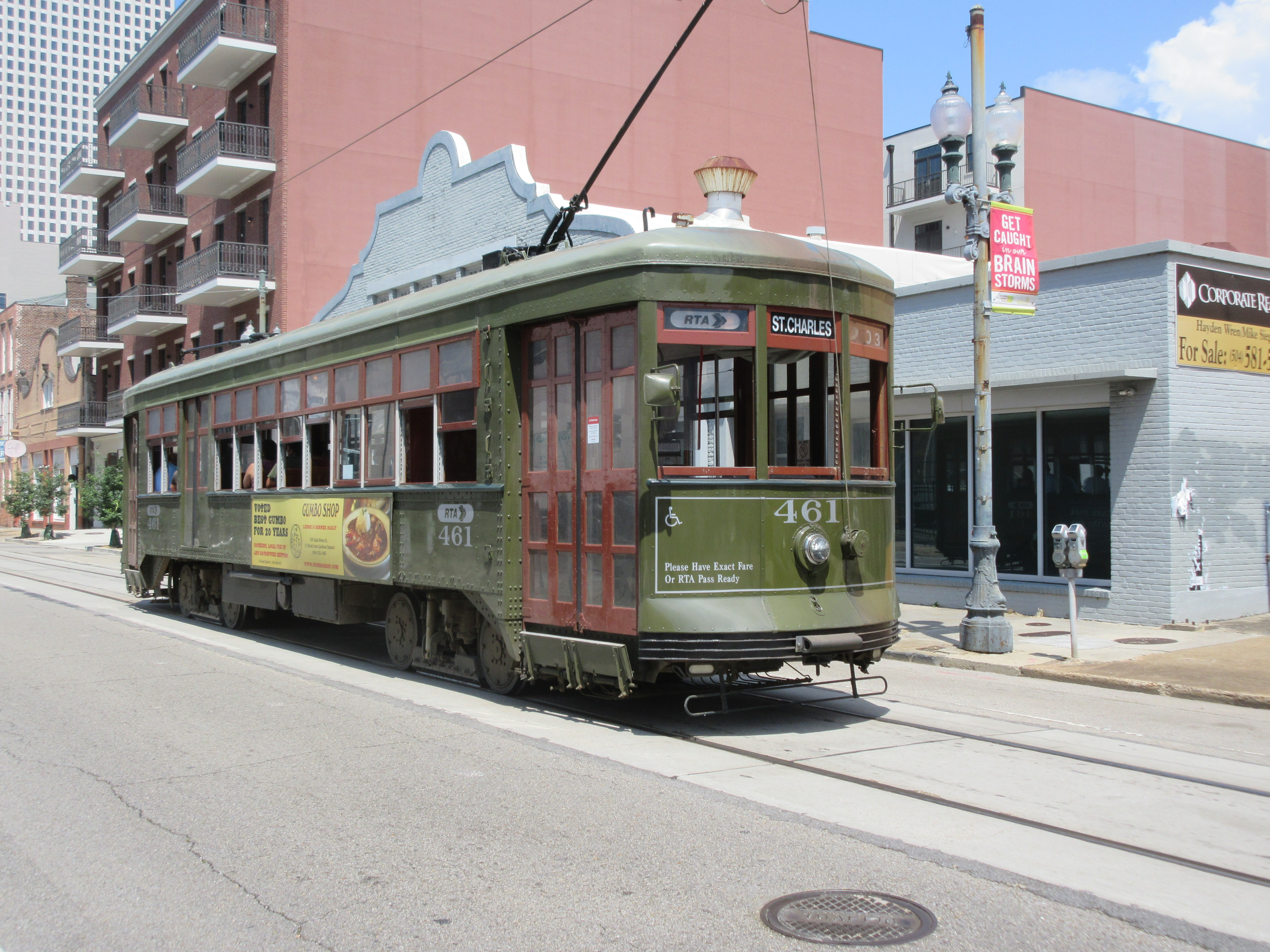
A streetcar on the St. Charles Avenue Line in New Orleans

Predominantly serving New Orleans, the New Orleans Regional Transit Authority is the largest transit agency in the state. Other transit organizations are St. Bernard Urban Rapid Transit, Jefferson Transit, Capital Area Transit System, Lafayette Transit System, Shreveport Area Transit System, and Monroe Transit, among others.

The Louisiana Transportation Authority (under the Louisiana Department of Transportation and Development) was created in 2001 to "promote, plan, finance, develop, construct, control, regulate, operate and maintain any tollway or transitway to be constructed within its jurisdiction. Development, construction, improvement, expansion, and maintenance of an efficient, safe, and well-maintained intermodal transportation system is essential to promote Louisiana's economic growth and the ability of Louisiana's business and industry to compete in regional, national, and global markets and to provide a high quality of life for the people of Louisiana."

=== Air ===
Louis Armstrong New Orleans International Airport (MSY) is the busiest airport in Louisiana by an order of magnitude. It is also the second lowest-lying international airport in the world, at just 4.5 feet (1.4 m) above sea level. There are six other primary airports in the state: Baton Rouge Metropolitan, Shreveport Regional, Lafayette Regional, Alexandria International, Monroe Regional, and Lake Charles Regional. A total of 69 public-use airports exist in Louisiana.

=== Waterways ===
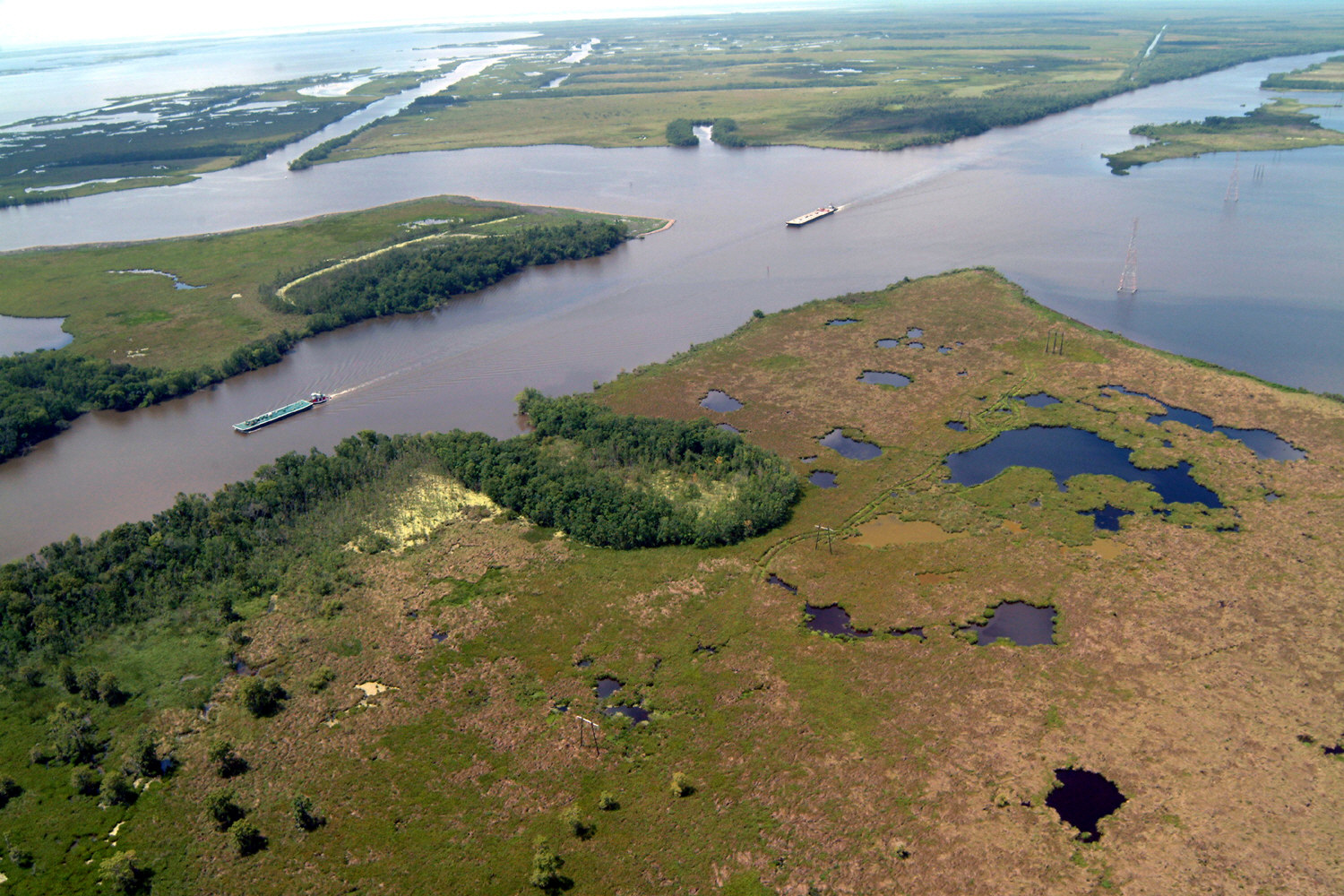
Gulf Intracoastal Waterway near New Orleans

The Gulf Intracoastal Waterway is an important means of transporting commercial goods such as petroleum and petroleum products, agricultural produce, building materials and manufactured goods. In 2018, the state sued the federal government to repair erosion along the waterway.

== Law and government ==
The Louisiana State Capitol in Baton Rouge, the tallest state capitol building in the United States

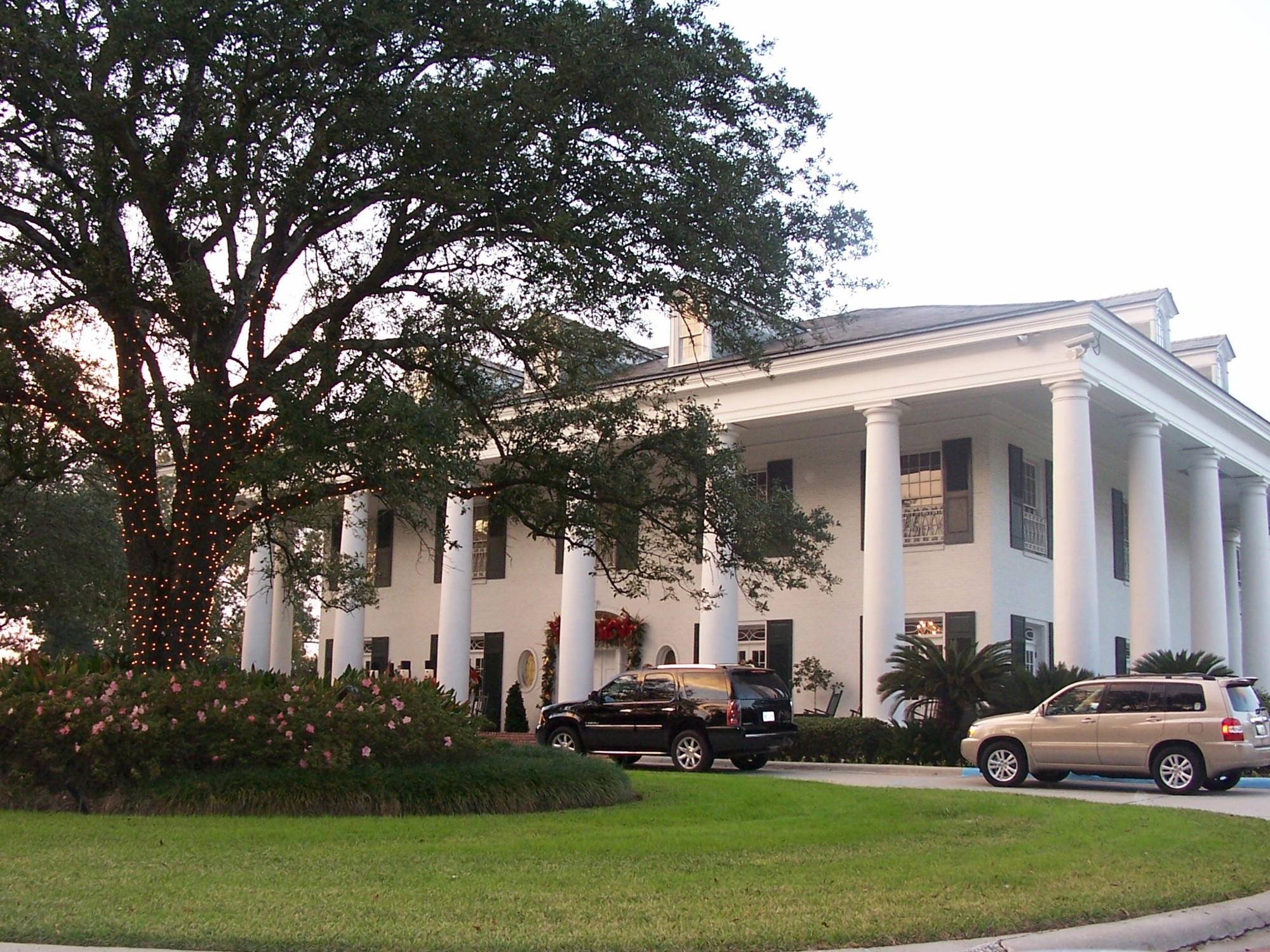
The Louisiana Governor's Mansion

In 1849, the state moved the capital from New Orleans to Baton Rouge. Donaldsonville, Opelousas, and Shreveport have briefly served as the seat of Louisiana state government. The Louisiana State Capitol and the Louisiana Governor's Mansion are both located in Baton Rouge. The Louisiana Supreme Court, however, did not move to Baton Rouge but remains headquartered in New Orleans.

Louisiana has six congressional districts and is represented in the U.S. House of Representatives by four Republicans and two Democrats. Louisiana had eight votes in the Electoral College for the 2020 election.

In a 2020 study, Louisiana was ranked as the 24th hardest state for citizens to vote in. Louisiana has one of the most restrictive abortion laws in the United States.

The Louisiana State Penitentiary, Angola is the largest maximum-security prison in the United States.

=== Administrative divisions ===
Louisiana is divided into 64 parishes (the equivalent of counties in most other states).

- List of parishes in Louisiana
- Louisiana census statistical areas

Most parishes have an elected government known as the Police Jury, dating from the colonial days. It is the legislative and executive government of the parish, and is elected by the voters. Its members are called Jurors, and together they elect a president as their chairman.

A more limited number of parishes operate under home rule charters, electing various forms of government. This include mayor–council, council–manager (in which the council hires a professional operating manager for the parish), and others.

=== Civil law ===
The Louisiana political and legal structure has maintained several elements from the times of French and Spanish governance. One is the use of the term "parish" (from the French: paroisse) in place of "county" for administrative subdivision. Another is the legal system of civil law based on French, German, and Spanish legal codes and ultimately Roman law, as opposed to English common law.

Louisiana's civil law system is what the majority of sovereign states in the world use, especially in Europe and its former colonies, excluding those that derive their legal systems from the British Empire. However, it is incorrect to equate the Louisiana Civil Code with the Napoleonic Code. Although the Napoleonic Code and Louisiana law draw from common legal roots, the Napoleonic Code was never in force in Louisiana, as it was enacted in 1804, after the United States had purchased and annexed Louisiana in 1803.

The Louisiana Civil Code is the controlling authority on civil matters in the state and has been continuously revised and updated since its enactment in 1808. While some of the differences between the legal systems have been bridged due to the strong influence of common law tradition, the civil law tradition is still deeply rooted in most aspects of Louisiana private law. Thus property, contractual, business entities structure, much of civil procedure, and family law, as well as some aspects of criminal law, are based mostly on traditional Roman legal thinking.

=== Marriage ===
In 1997, Louisiana became the first state to offer the option of a traditional marriage or a covenant marriage. In a covenant marriage, the couple waives their right to a "no-fault" divorce after six months of separation, which is available in a traditional marriage. To divorce under a covenant marriage, a couple must demonstrate cause. Marriages between ascendants and descendants, and marriages between collaterals within the fourth degree (i.e., siblings, aunt and nephew, uncle and niece, first cousins) are prohibited. Same-sex marriages were prohibited by statute, but the U.S. Supreme Court declared such bans unconstitutional in 2015 in Obergefell v. Hodges. Same-sex marriages are now performed statewide. Louisiana is a community property state.

=== Elections ===
Treemap of the popular vote by parish, 2016 presidential election

United States presidential election results for Louisiana
Year	Republican / Whig		Democratic		Third party(ies)	
Year	No.	%	No.	%	No.	%
1836	3,583	48.26%	3,842	51.74%	0	0.00%
1840	11,296	59.73%	7,616	40.27%	0	0.00%
1844	13,083	48.70%	13,782	51.30%	0	0.00%
1848	18,487	54.59%	15,379	45.41%	0	0.00%
1852	17,255	48.06%	18,647	51.94%	0	0.00%
1856	0	0.00%	22,164	51.70%	20,709	48.30%
1860	0	0.00%	7,625	15.10%	42,885	84.90%
1868	33,263	29.31%	80,225	70.69%	0	0.00%
1872	71,663	55.69%	57,029	44.31%	0	0.00%
1876	75,315	51.65%	70,508	48.35%	0	0.00%
1880	38,978	37.31%	65,047	62.27%	437	0.42%
1884	46,347	42.37%	62,594	57.22%	458	0.42%
1888	30,660	26.46%	85,032	73.37%	199	0.17%
1892	26,963	23.47%	87,926	76.53%	0	0.00%
1896	22,037	21.81%	77,175	76.38%	1,834	1.82%
1900	14,234	20.96%	53,668	79.03%	4	0.01%
1904	5,205	9.66%	47,708	88.50%	995	1.85%
1908	8,958	11.93%	63,568	84.63%	2,591	3.45%
1912	3,833	4.84%	60,871	76.81%	14,544	18.35%
1916	6,466	6.95%	79,875	85.90%	6,641	7.14%
1920	38,538	30.49%	87,519	69.24%	339	0.27%
1924	24,670	20.23%	93,218	76.44%	4,063	3.33%
1928	51,160	23.70%	164,655	76.29%	18	0.01%
1932	18,853	7.01%	249,418	92.79%	533	0.20%
1936	36,791	11.16%	292,894	88.82%	93	0.03%
1940	52,446	14.09%	319,751	85.88%	108	0.03%
1944	67,750	19.39%	281,564	80.59%	69	0.02%
1948	72,657	17.45%	136,344	32.75%	207,335	49.80%
1952	306,925	47.08%	345,027	52.92%	0	0.00%
1956	329,047	53.28%	243,977	39.51%	44,520	7.21%
1960	230,980	28.59%	407,339	50.42%	169,572	20.99%
1964	509,225	56.81%	387,068	43.19%	0	0.00%
1968	257,535	23.47%	309,615	28.21%	530,300	48.32%
1972	686,852	65.32%	298,142	28.35%	66,497	6.32%
1976	587,446	45.95%	661,365	51.73%	29,628	2.32%
1980	792,853	51.20%	708,453	45.75%	47,285	3.05%
1984	1,037,299	60.77%	651,586	38.18%	17,937	1.05%
1988	883,702	54.27%	717,460	44.06%	27,040	1.66%
1992	733,386	40.97%	815,971	45.58%	240,660	13.44%
1996	712,586	39.94%	927,837	52.01%	143,536	8.05%
2000	927,871	52.55%	792,344	44.88%	45,441	2.57%
2004	1,102,169	56.72%	820,299	42.22%	20,638	1.06%
2008	1,148,275	58.56%	782,989	39.93%	29,497	1.50%
2012	1,152,262	57.78%	809,141	40.58%	32,662	1.64%
2016	1,178,638	58.09%	780,154	38.45%	70,240	3.46%
2020	1,255,776	58.46%	856,034	39.85%	36,252	1.69%
2024	1,208,505	60.22%	766,870	38.21%	31,600	1.57%

From 1898 to 1965, a period when Louisiana had effectively disfranchised most African Americans and many poor whites by provisions of a new constitution, this was essentially a one-party state dominated by white Democrats. Elites had control in the early 20th century, before populist Huey Long came to power as governor. In multiple acts of resistance, blacks left behind the segregation, violence and oppression of the state and moved out to seek better opportunities in northern and western industrial cities during the Great Migrations of 1910–1970, markedly reducing their proportion of population in Louisiana. The franchise for whites was expanded somewhat during these decades, but blacks remained essentially disfranchised until after the civil rights movement of the mid-20th century, gaining enforcement of their constitutional rights through passage by Congress of the Voting Rights Act of 1965.

Since the 1960s, when civil rights legislation was passed under President Lyndon Johnson to protect voting and civil rights, most African Americans in the state have affiliated with the Democratic Party. In the same years, many white social conservatives have moved to support Republican Party candidates in national, gubernatorial and statewide elections. In 2004, David Vitter was the first Republican in Louisiana to be popularly elected as a U.S. senator. The previous Republican senator, John S. Harris, who took office in 1868 during Reconstruction, was chosen by the state legislature under the rules of the 19th century.

Louisiana is unique among U.S. states in using a system for its state and local elections similar to that of modern France. All candidates, regardless of party affiliation, run in a nonpartisan blanket primary (or "jungle primary") on Election Day. If no candidate has more than 50% of the vote, the two candidates with the highest vote totals compete in a runoff election approximately one month later. This run-off method does not take into account party identification; therefore, it is not uncommon for a Democrat to be in a runoff with a fellow Democrat or a Republican to be in a runoff with a fellow Republican.

Congressional races have also been held under the jungle primary system. All other states (except Washington, California, and Maine) use single-party primaries followed by a general election between party candidates, each conducted by either a plurality voting system or runoff voting, to elect senators, representatives, and statewide officials. Between 2008 and 2010, federal congressional elections were run under a closed primary system—limited to registered party members. However, on the passage of House Bill 292, Louisiana again adopted a nonpartisan blanket primary for its federal congressional elections.

Louisiana has six seats in the U.S. House of Representatives, five of which are currently held by Republicans and one by a Democrat. Though the state historically flips between Republican and Democratic governors, Louisiana is not classified as a swing state in presidential elections, and has it has been considered a Republican Party stronghold during the 21st century. Louisiana's incumbent governor is Republican Jeff Landry, and the state's two U.S. senators are Bill Cassidy (R) and John Neely Kennedy (R).

Party registration as of July 1, 2026
Party	Number of voters	Fraction
Republican	1,064,496	36.1%
Democratic	1,062,135	36.0%
No Party	820,040	27.8%
Other Parties	3,329	0.1%
Total	2,950,000	100.0%

=== Law enforcement ===
Louisiana's statewide police force is the Louisiana State Police. In 1988, the Criminal Investigation Bureau was reorganized. Its troopers have statewide jurisdiction with power to enforce all laws of the state, including city and parish ordinances. Each year, they patrol over 12 million miles (19 million kilometres) of roadway and arrest about 10,000 impaired drivers. The State Police are primarily a traffic enforcement agency, with other sections that delve into trucking safety, narcotics enforcement, and gaming oversight.

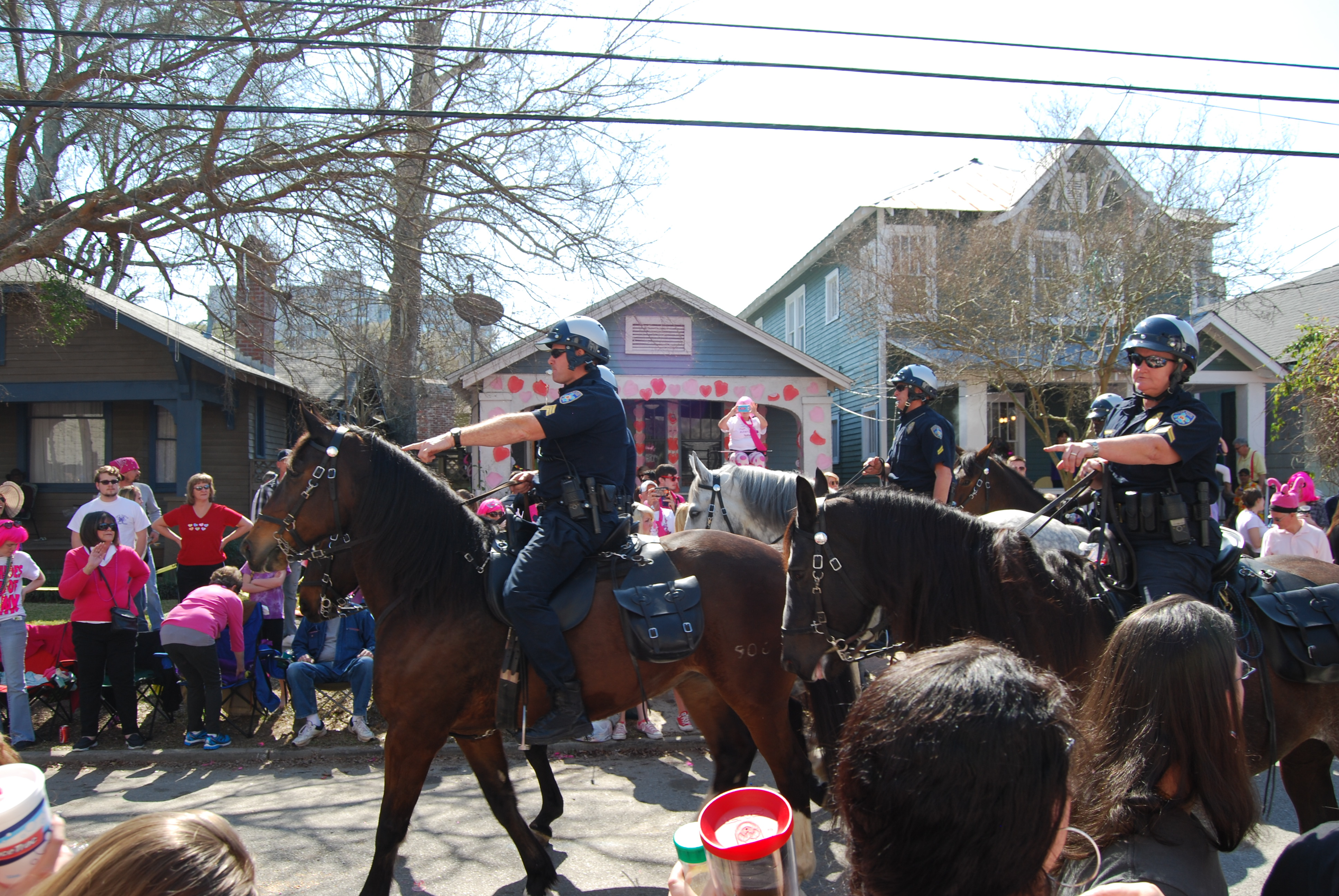
Mardi Gras celebrations in the Spanish Town section of Baton Rouge

The elected sheriff in each parish is its chief law enforcement officer. They are the keepers of the local parish prisons, which house felony and misdemeanor prisoners. They are the primary criminal patrol and first responder agency in all matters criminal and civil. They are also the official tax collectors in each parish. The sheriffs are responsible for general law enforcement in their respective parishes, with the exception of Orleans Parish where this falls to the New Orleans Police Department. Before 2010, Orleans Parish was the only parish to have two sheriff's offices, with a different elected sheriff overseeing civil and criminal matters. In 2006, a bill was passed which eventually consolidated the two sheriff's departments into one parish sheriff responsible for both.

In 2015, Louisiana had a higher murder rate (10.3 per 100,000) than any other state in the country for the 27th straight year. Louisiana is the only state with an annual average murder rate (13.6 per 100,000) at least twice as high as the U.S. annual average (6.6 per 100,000) during that period, according to Bureau of Justice Statistics from FBI Uniform Crime Reports. In a different kind of criminal activity, the Chicago Tribune reports that Louisiana is the most corrupt state in the United States.

According to a 2012 article in The Times Picayune, Louisiana is the prison capital of the world. Many for-profit private prisons and sheriff-owned prisons have been built and operate here. Louisiana's incarceration rate is nearly five times Iran's, 13 times China's and 20 times Germany's. Minorities are incarcerated at rates disproportionate to their share of the state's population. There are more people serving life sentences without parole in Louisiana than in Texas, Tennessee, Arkansas, Alabama and Mississippi combined.

The New Orleans Police Department began a sanctuary policy to "no longer cooperate with federal immigration enforcement" beginning on February 28, 2016.

On June 19, 2024, Jeff Landry signed a bill to officially require that the Ten Commandments be displayed in every classroom in public schools and colleges. In November 2024, the law was overturned by a federal court.

=== Judiciary ===
The judiciary of Louisiana is defined under the constitution and law of Louisiana and comprises the Louisiana Supreme Court, the Louisiana Circuit Courts of Appeal, the district courts, the Justice of the Peace courts, the mayor's courts, the city courts, and the parish courts. The chief justice of the Louisiana Supreme Court is the chief administrator of the judiciary. Its administration is aided by the Judiciary Commission of Louisiana, the Louisiana Attorney Disciplinary Board, and the Judicial Council of the Supreme Court of Louisiana.

== National Guard ==
Louisiana has more than 9,000 soldiers in the Louisiana Army National Guard, including the 225th Engineer Brigade and the 256th Infantry Brigade. Both these units have served overseas during the war on terror. The Louisiana Air National Guard has more than 2,000 airmen, and its 159th Fighter Wing has likewise seen combat.

Training sites in the state include Louisiana National Guard Training Center Pineville near Pineville, Camp Villere near Slidell, Camp Minden near Minden, England Air Park (formerly England Air Force Base) near Alexandria, Gillis Long Center near Carville, and Jackson Barracks in New Orleans.

== Sports ==
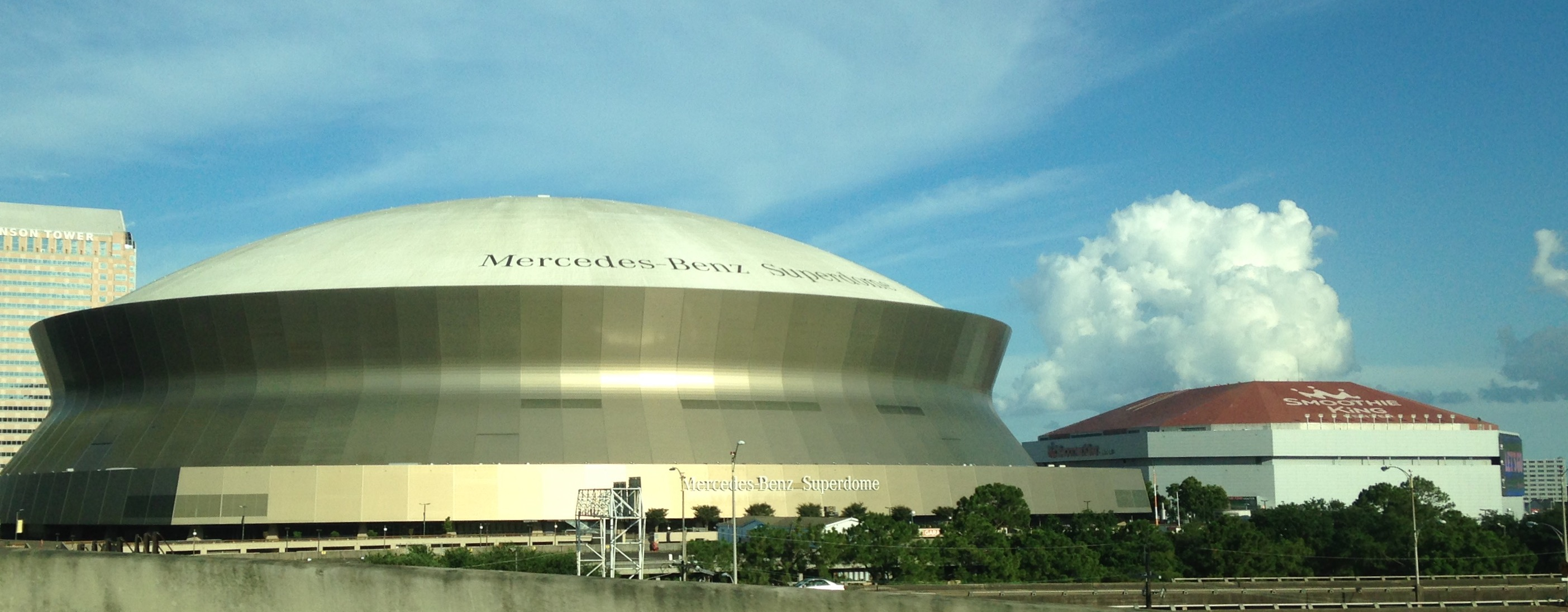
Caesars Superdome and Smoothie King Center in New Orleans.

Louisiana is the least populous state with more than one major professional sports league franchise: the National Basketball Association's New Orleans Pelicans and the National Football League's New Orleans Saints.

Louisiana has 12 collegiate NCAA Division I programs, a high number given its population. The state has no NCAA Division II teams and only two NCAA Division III teams. As of 2019, the LSU Tigers football team has won 12 Southeastern Conference titles, six Sugar Bowls and four national championships.

Each year New Orleans plays host to the Bayou Classic, and the New Orleans Bowl college football games, while Shreveport hosts the Independence Bowl. New Orleans has hosted the Super Bowl a record eleven times, as well as the BCS National Championship Game, NBA All-Star Game and NCAA Men's Division I Basketball Championship.

The Zurich Classic of New Orleans, is a PGA Tour golf tournament held since 1938. The Rock 'n' Roll Mardi Gras Marathon and Crescent City Classic are two road running competitions held at New Orleans.

As of 2016, Louisiana was the birthplace of the most NFL players per capita for the eighth year in a row.

Louisiana State University has a total of 48 NCAA Division I national sports championships throughout the school's history. The most recent championship is the college baseball championship in May 2025.

== Notable people ==
- Phil Anselmo, singer, songwriter, best known for being member of the metal band Pantera
- Terry Bradshaw, former NFL quarterback and sports personality
- James Carville, political strategist known for his success with Bill Clinton's presidential campaign
- Patricia Clarkson, actress
- Ellen DeGeneres, comedian, television host, actress, writer, and producer
- Armand Duplantis, pole vaulter. IAAF male World Athlete of the Year 2020
- Mannie Fresh; DJ, producer, and rapper
- Kevin Gates; rapper, singer, songwriter, and entrepreneur
- John Kennedy, US Senator
- DJ Khaled; American DJ, record executive and media personality
- Sal Khan; Educator, and founder of Khan Academy
- Angela Kinsey, actress
- Ali Landry, actress and Miss USA 1996
- Jared Leto, actor and musician
- Jerry Lee Lewis, singer and piano-player
- Huey Long, politician
- Peyton Manning, former American football quarterback
- Tim McGraw, singer, actor and record producer
- Tyler Perry, actor, director, producer, and screenwriter
- Dustin Poirier; American mixed martial artist, currently signed to the UFC
- Addison Rae; American singer and actress
- Erin Reed; American journalist and transgender activist
- Zachary Richard; Cajun singer, songwriter and poet
- Fred L. Smith Jr., founder of Competitive Enterprise Institute
- Ian Somerhalder, actor, model and director
- Britney Spears; singer, songwriter, dancer and actress
- Jamie Lynn Spears, singer and actress
- $uicideboy$; singer, rapper and producer
- Summrs; singer, rapper and songwriter
- Lil Wayne; rapper, singer, songwriter, record executive, entrepreneur, and actor
- Shane West, actor, singer and songwriter
- Reese Witherspoon, actress
- YoungBoy Never Broke Again; rapper, singer, and songwriter

== See also ==
- Index of Louisiana-related articles
- Outline of Louisiana
- USS Louisiana, 5 ships
- USRC Louisiana

== Notes ==
Pronunciation

== Bibliography ==
- The Sugar Masters: Planters and Slaves in Louisiana's Cane World, 1820–1860 by Richard Follett, Louisiana State University Press, 2007. ISBN 978-0-8071-3247-0
- The Slave Trade: The Story of the Atlantic Slave Trade, 1440–1870 by Hugh Thomas. 1997: Simon and Schuster. p. 548.
- Inhuman Bondage: The Rise and Fall of Slavery in the New World by David Brion Davis 2006: Oxford University Press. ISBN 978-0-19-533944-4
- Yiannopoulos, A.N., The Civil Codes of Louisiana (reprinted from Civil Law System: Louisiana and Comparative law, A Coursebook: Texts, Cases and Materials, 3d Edition; similar to version in preface to Louisiana Civil Code, ed. by Yiannopoulos)
- Rodolfo Batiza, "The Louisiana Civil Code of 1808: Its Actual Sources and Present Relevance", 46 TUL. L. REV. 4 (1971); Rodolfo Batiza, "Sources of the Civil Code of 1808, Facts and Speculation: A Rejoinder", 46 TUL. L. REV. 628 (1972); Robert A. Pascal, Sources of the Digest of 1808: A Reply to Professor Batiza, 46 TUL. L. REV. 603 (1972); Joseph M. Sweeney, Tournament of Scholars Over the Sources of the Civil Code of 1808,46 TUL. L. REV. 585 (1972).
- The standard history of the state, though only through the Civil War, is Charles Gayarré's History of Louisiana (various editions, culminating in 1866, 4 vols., with a posthumous and further expanded edition in 1885).
- A number of accounts by 17th- and 18th-century French explorers: Jean-Bernard Bossu, François-Marie Perrin du Lac, Pierre-François-Xavier de Charlevoix, Dumont (as published by Fr. Mascrier), Fr. Louis Hennepin, Lahontan, Louis Narcisse Baudry des Lozières, Jean-Baptiste Bénard de la Harpe, and Laval. In this group, the explorer Antoine Simon Le Page du Pratz may be the first historian of Louisiana with his Histoire de la Louisiane (3 vols., Paris, 1758; 2 vols., London, 1763)
- François Xavier Martin's History of Louisiana (2 vols., New Orleans, 1827–1829, later ed. by J. F. Condon, continued to 1861, New Orleans, 1882) is the first scholarly treatment of the subject, along with François Barbé-Marbois' Histoire de la Louisiane et de la cession de colonie par la France aux Etats-Unis (Paris, 1829; in English, Philadelphia, 1830).
- Alcée Fortier's A History of Louisiana (N.Y., 4 vols., 1904) is the most recent of the large-scale scholarly histories of the state.
- The official works of Albert Phelps and Grace King, the publications of the Louisiana Historical Society and several works on the history of New Orleans (q.v.), among them those by Henry Rightor and John Smith Kendall provide background.

Preceded by Ohio	List of U.S. states by date of admission to the Union; Admitted on April 30, 1812 (18th)	Succeeded by Indiana
