= 1860 United States presidential election in Louisiana =

- November 6, 1860
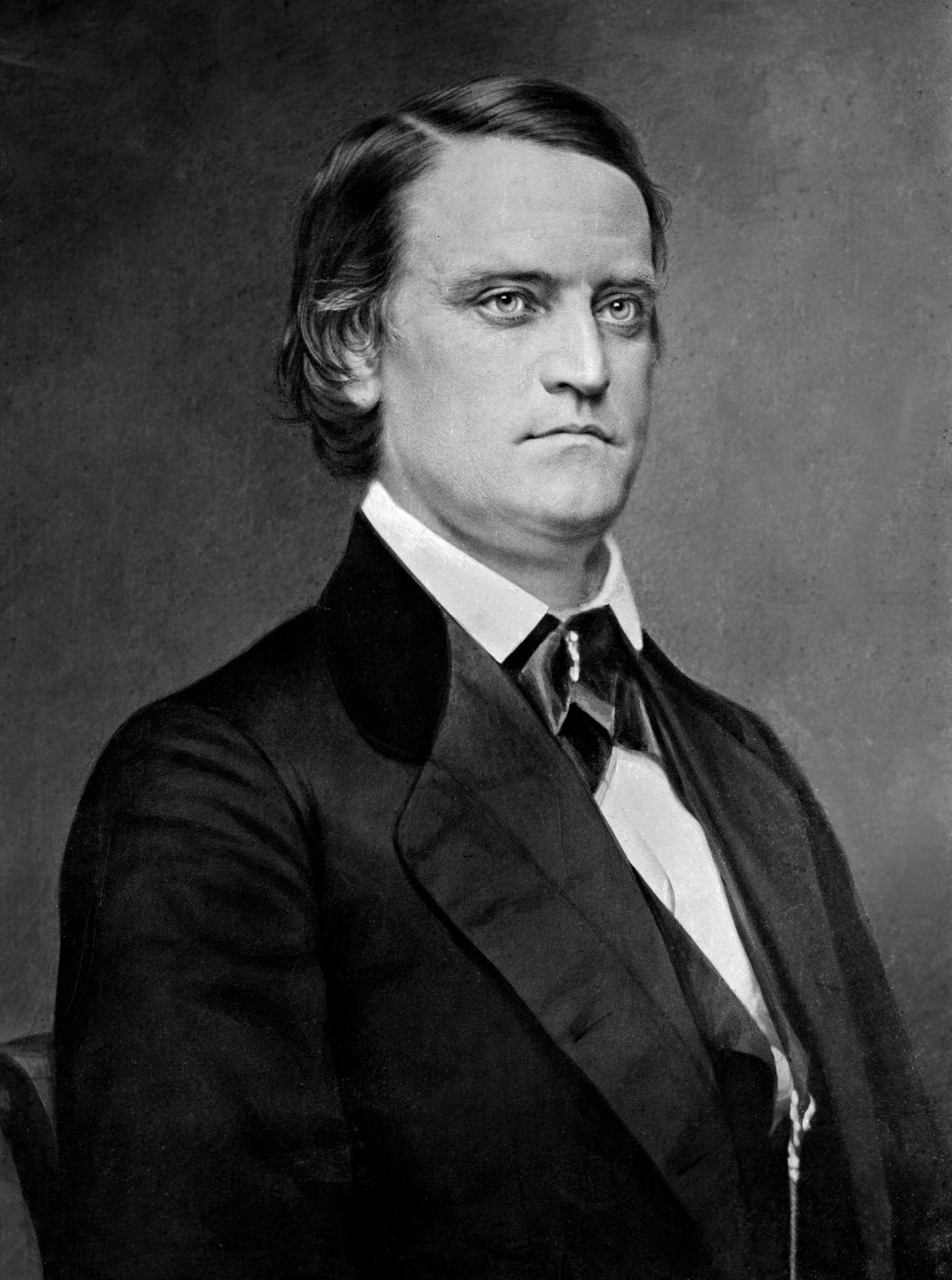

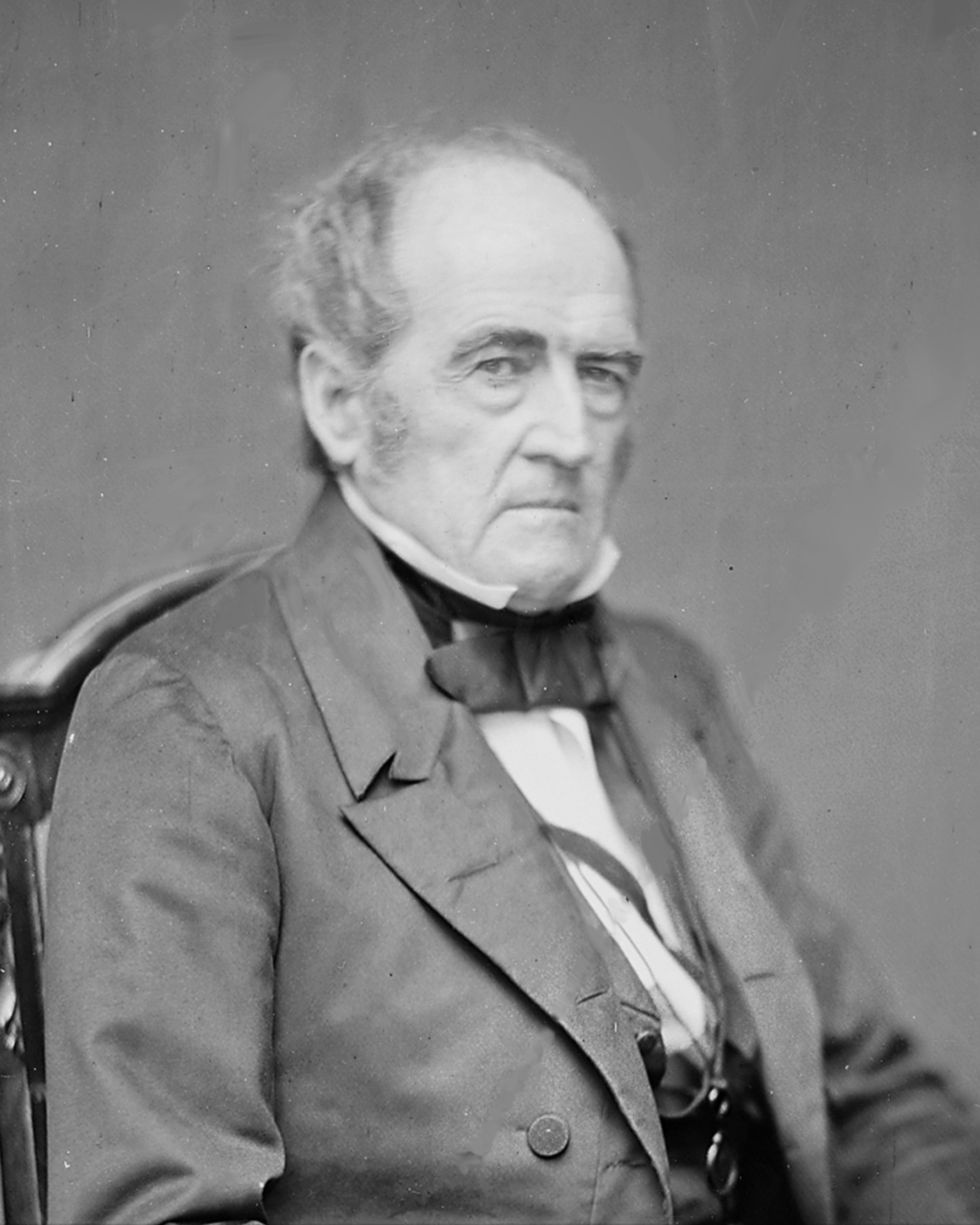

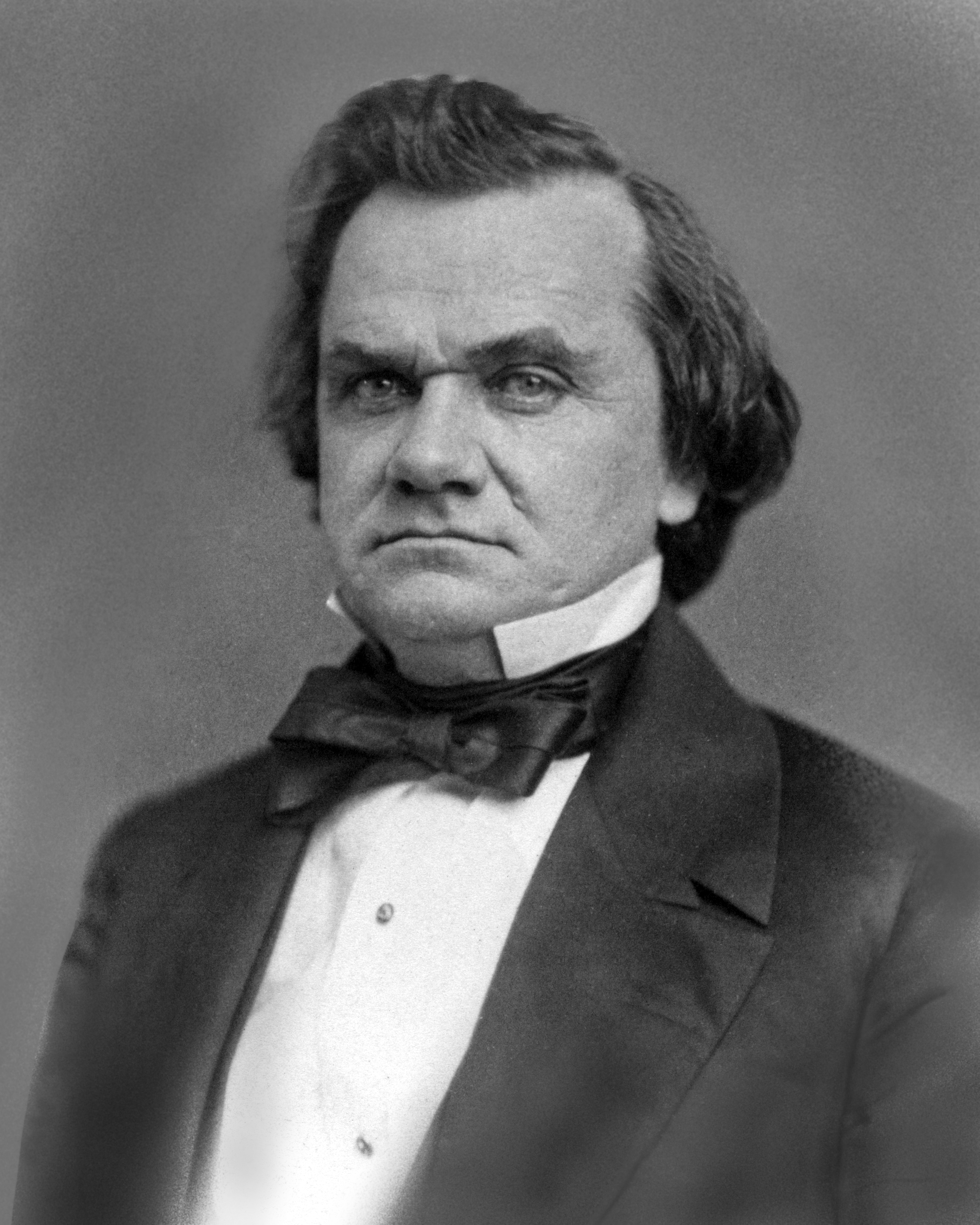
Nominee	John Breckenridge	John Bell	Stephen A. Douglas
Party	Southern Democratic	Constitutional Union	Democratic
Home state	Kentucky	Tennessee	Illinois
Running mate	Joseph Lane	Edward Everett	Herschel V. Johnson
Electoral vote	6	0	0
Popular vote	22,681	20,204	7,625
Percentage	44.90%	40.00%	15.10%
Parish results
Breckinridge
40–50%
50–60%
60–70%
70–80%
80–90%
90–100%
Bell
40–50%
50–60%
60–70%
Douglas
40–50%
President before election
James Buchanan
Democratic
Elected President
Abraham Lincoln
Republican

The 1860 United States presidential election in Louisiana took place on November 6, 1860, as part of the 1860 United States presidential election. Louisiana voters chose six representatives, or electors, to the Electoral College, who voted for president and vice president.

The Republican Party and its candidate Abraham Lincoln did not have significant ballot distribution in the state.

== Campaign ==
Ahead of the 1860 Democratic convention, Louisiana Democrats were divided between supporters of Senator John Slidell and supporters of Senator Stephen A. Douglas for president. The Slidell faction was “pro-southern rights, pro-[Buchanan] administration, and favored Congressional protection of slavery in the territories”, while the Douglas faction supported popular sovereignty. The Slidell faction were a majority statewide. The minority Douglas wing included former Senator Pierre Soulé and congressman Miles Taylor.

In the general election, Breckinridge was supported by Senators Slidell and Benjamin, as well as the state Democratic Party organization.

== Results ==
1860 United States presidential election in Louisiana
Party	Candidate	Votes	%
Southern Democratic	John C. Breckinridge	22,681	44.90%
Constitutional Union	John Bell	20,204	40.00%
Democratic	Stephen A. Douglas	7,625	15.10%
Total votes		50,510	100.00%

=== Results By Parish ===
1860 United States Presidential Election in Louisiana (By Parish)
Parish	John C. Breckinridge Southern Democratic		John Bell Constitutional Union		Stephen A. Douglas Democratic		Total votes cast
Parish	#	%	#	%	#	%	Total votes cast
Ascension	144	18.49%	279	35.82%	356	45.70%	779
Assumption	311	30.43%	233	22.80%	478	46.77%	1,022
Avoyelles	750	71.63%	290	27.70%	7	0.67%	1,047
Bienville	682	61.50%	293	26.42%	134	12.08%	1,109
Bossier	489	61.36%	253	31.74%	55	6.90%	797
Caddo	648	52.68%	545	44.31%	37	3.01%	1,230
Calcasieu	396	94.29%	24	5.71%	0	0.00%	420
Caldwell	325	63.48%	136	26.56%	51	9.96%	512
Carroll	530	53.75%	398	40.37%	58	5.88%	986
Catahoula	676	59.56%	439	38.68%	20	1.76%	1,135
Claiborne	896	50.28%	720	40.40%	166	9.32%	1,782
Concordia	175	52.71%	152	45.78%	5	1.51%	332
De Soto	634	63.40%	364	36.40%	2	0.20%	1,000
East Baton Rouge	490	41.00%	569	47.62%	136	11.38%	1,195
East Feliciana	377	48.03%	277	35.29%	131	16.69%	785
Franklin	342	54.98%	240	38.59%	40	6.43%	622
Iberville	535	61.85%	229	26.47%	101	11.68%	865
Jackson	527	54.16%	337	34.64%	109	11.20%	973
Jefferson	198	12.47%	984	61.96%	406	25.57%	1,588
Lafayette	468	86.67%	71	13.15%	1	0.19%	540
Lafourche	214	20.44%	324	30.95%	509	48.62%	1,047
Livingston	425	53.73%	249	31.48%	117	14.79%	791
Madison	172	33.14%	255	49.13%	92	17.73%	519
Morehouse	381	49.16%	347	44.77%	47	6.06%	775
Natchitoches	754	54.09%	534	38.31%	106	7.60%	1,394
Orleans	2,645	24.36%	5,215	48.03%	2,998	27.61%	10,858
Ouachita	312	39.00%	340	42.50%	148	18.50%	800
Plaquemines	267	59.60%	54	12.05%	127	28.35%	448
Pointe Coupee	626	70.34%	193	21.69%	71	7.98%	890
Rapides	1,036	59.06%	620	35.35%	98	5.59%	1,754
Sabine	420	60.69%	227	32.80%	45	6.50%	692
St. Bernard	186	66.19%	56	19.93%	39	13.88%	281
St. Charles	79	48.47%	68	41.72%	16	9.82%	163
St. Helena	331	51.64%	292	45.55%	18	2.81%	641
St. James	160	28.57%	292	52.14%	108	19.29%	560
St. John the Baptist	129	32.91%	176	44.90%	87	22.19%	392
St. Landry	961	51.50%	884	47.37%	21	1.13%	1,866
St. Mary	462	48.99%	392	41.57%	88	9.33%	943
St. Martin	572	48.15%	567	47.73%	49	4.12%	1,188
St. Tammany	164	30.43%	243	45.08%	132	24.49%	539
Tensas	254	64.96%	134	34.27%	3	0.77%	391
Terrebonne	441	45.70%	440	45.60%	84	8.70%	965
Union	726	55.85%	552	42.46%	22	1.69%	1,300
Vermilion	211	59.60%	142	40.11%	1	0.28%	354
Washington	387	76.79%	112	22.22%	5	0.99%	504
West Baton Rouge	147	37.50%	218	55.61%	27	6.89%	392
West Feliciana	272	55.17%	188	38.13%	33	6.69%	493
Winn	354	41.55%	257	30.16%	241	28.29%	852
Total	22,681	44.90%	20,204	40.00%	7,625	15.10%	50,510

== Analysis ==
Louisiana was won by Southern Democratic candidate, Vice President John C. Breckinridge and his running mate Senator Joseph Lane of Oregon. The ticket defeated the Constitutional Union ticket of Senator John Bell of Tennessee and his running mate Massachusetts Governor Edward Everett along with Northern Democrat Senator Stephen A. Douglas of Illinois and his running mate Georgia Governor Herschel V. Johnson. Breckinridge won the state by a narrow margin of 4.90%. Republican Party candidate Abraham Lincoln was not on the ballot in the state.

This was the first time Louisiana ever voted for a losing candidate since it began popular vote elections for president in 1828. Even when its vote was chosen by the state legislature, the only time it voted for a candidate who did not win was in 1824, when it voted for Andrew Jackson, but Jackson won the nationwide popular vote. Thus, this was the first time Louisiana ever voted by any means for a candidate who lost the electoral vote and popular vote.

== See also ==
- United States presidential elections in Louisiana
