= 1880 United States presidential election in Louisiana =

- November 2, 1880
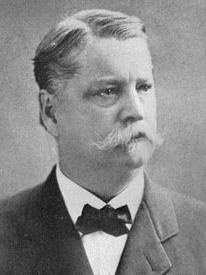

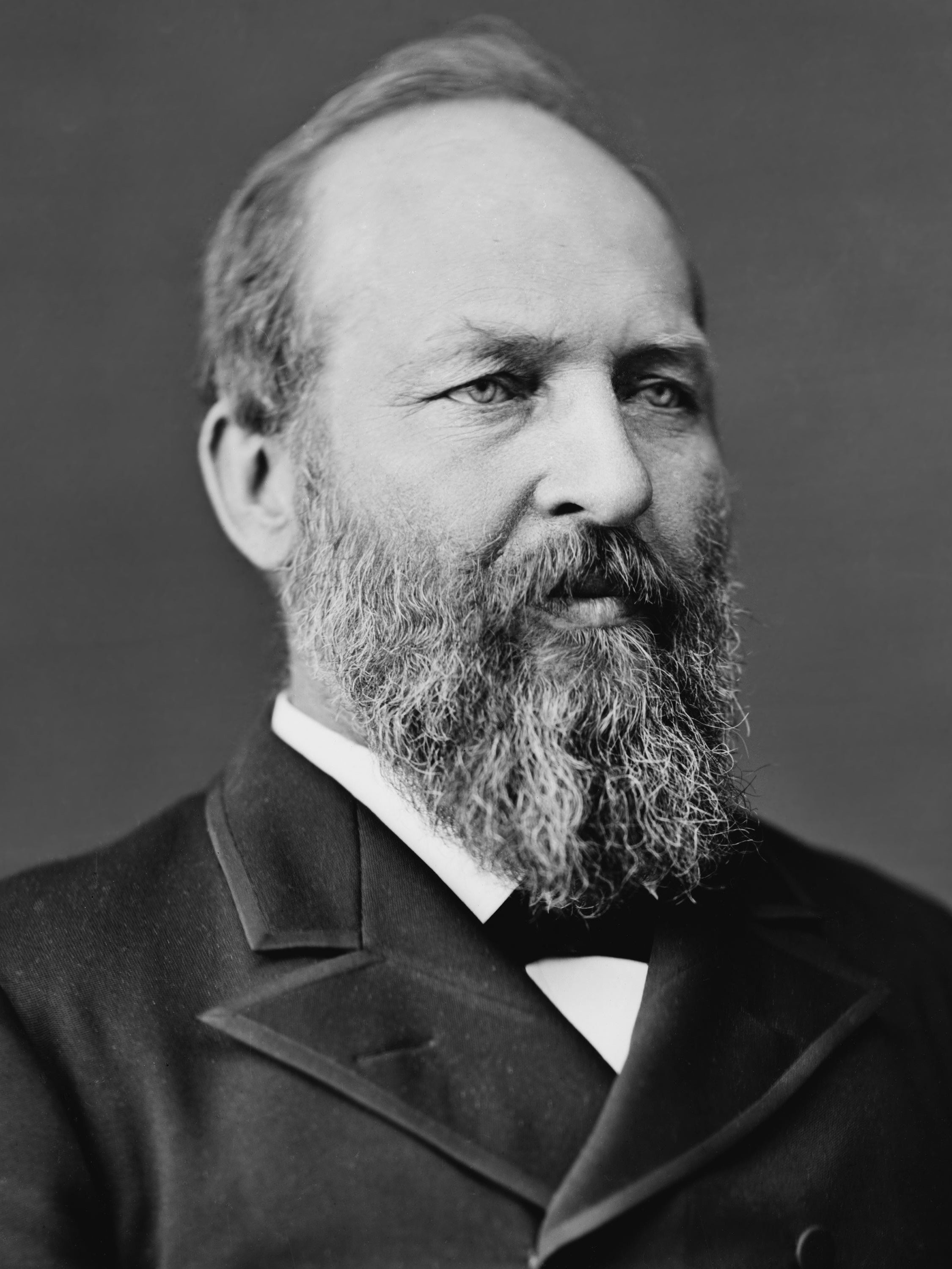
Nominee	Winfield Scott Hancock	James A. Garfield
Party	Democratic	Republican
Home state	Pennsylvania	Ohio
Running mate	William Hayden English	Chester A. Arthur
Electoral vote	8	0
Popular vote	65,047	38,978
Percentage	62.27%	37.31%
Parish results
Hancock
40–50%
50–60%
60–70%
70–80%
80–90%
90–100%
Garfield
50–60%
60–70%
70–80%
80–90%
90–100%
President before election
Rutherford B. Hayes
Republican
Elected President
James A. Garfield
Republican

The 1880 United States presidential election in Louisiana took place on November 2, 1880, as part of the 1880 United States presidential election. Voters chose eight representatives, or electors to the Electoral College, who voted for president and vice president.

Louisiana voted for the Democratic nominee, Winfield Scott Hancock, over the Republican nominee, James A. Garfield. Hancock won the state by a margin of 24.96%.

== Results ==
1880 United States presidential election in Louisiana
Party	Candidate	Running mate	Popular vote		Electoral vote	
Party	Candidate	Running mate	Count	%	Count	%
Democratic	Winfield Scott Hancock of Pennsylvania	William Hayden English of Indiana	65,047	62.27%	8	100.00%
Republican	James Abram Garfield of Ohio	Chester Alan Arthur of New York	38,978	37.31%	0	0.00%
Greenback	James Baird Weaver of Iowa	Barzillai Jefferson Chambers of Texas	437	0.42%	0	0.00%
Total			104,462	100.00%	8	100.00%

== See also ==
- United States presidential elections in Louisiana
