= 1932 United States presidential election in Louisiana =

- November 8, 1932

All 10 Louisiana votes to the Electoral College

Nominee	Franklin D. Roosevelt	Herbert Hoover
Party	Democratic	Republican
Home state	New York	California
Running mate	John Nance Garner	Charles Curtis
Electoral vote	10	0
Popular vote	249,418	18,853
Percentage	92.79%	7.01%
Parish results
Roosevelt
70–80%
80–90%
90–100%
President before election
Herbert Hoover
Republican
Elected President
Franklin D. Roosevelt
Democratic

The 1932 United States presidential election in Louisiana took place on November 8, 1932, as part of the 1932 United States presidential election. Louisiana voters chose ten representatives, or electors, to the Electoral College, who voted for president and vice president.

Ever since the passage of a new constitution in 1898, Louisiana had been a one-party state dominated by the Democratic Party. The Republican Party became moribund due to the disenfranchisement of blacks and the complete absence of other support bases as Louisiana completely lacked upland or German refugee whites opposed to secession. Despite this absolute single-party dominance, non-partisan tendencies remained strong among wealthy sugar planters in Acadiana and within the business elite of New Orleans.

Until the rise of Huey P. Long, post-disenfranchisement Louisiana politics was dominated by the New Orleans–based “Choctaw Club”, which overcame Socialist, Wobbly, and Progressive challenges from the outlying upcountry, Imperial Calcasieu and Acadiana regions between the late 1900s and early 1920s. The three presidential elections between 1916 and 1924 saw a rebellion in Acadiana over sugar tariffs and Woodrow Wilson’s foreign and domestic policies; however, the nomination of Catholic Al Smith in 1928 rapidly restored their Democratic loyalty without causing significant upheaval in the remainder of the state, which was too focused on control of black labor to worry about Smith’s Catholicism. The effects of the Great Depression were extremely severe in the South, which had the highest unemployment rate in the nation. Many Southerners blamed this on the North and on Wall Street, rejecting Hoover’s claim that the Depression’s causes were exogenous, and this ensured that the previous decade's Acadiana revolts would not be repeated.

Louisiana was won by Governor Franklin D. Roosevelt (D–New York), running with Speaker John Nance Garner, with 92.79 percent of the popular vote, against incumbent President Herbert Hoover (R–California), running with Vice President Charles Curtis, with 7.01 percent of the popular vote.

By percentage of the popular vote won, Louisiana was Roosevelt's third-best state, behind only South Carolina and Mississippi.

== Results ==
1932 United States presidential election in Louisiana
Party	Candidate	Votes	%
Democratic	Franklin D. Roosevelt	249,418	92.79%
Republican	Herbert Hoover (inc.)	18,853	7.01%
Write-ins	—	533	0.20%
Total votes		268,804	100%

=== Results by parish ===
1932 United States presidential election in Louisiana by parish
Parish	Franklin Delano Roosevelt Democratic		Herbert Clark Hoover Republican		Various candidates Write-ins		Margin		Total votes cast
Parish	#	%	#	%	#	%	#	%	Total votes cast
Acadia	3,583	91.08%	351	8.92%			3,232	82.16%	3,934
Allen	2,075	93.93%	130	5.89%	4	0.18%	1,945	88.05%	2,209
Ascension	1,800	86.58%	279	13.42%			1,521	73.16%	2,079
Assumption	1,538	79.94%	386	20.06%			1,152	59.88%	1,924
Avoyelles	3,148	96.03%	130	3.97%			3,018	92.07%	3,278
Beauregard	2,319	94.08%	146	5.92%			2,173	88.15%	2,465
Bienville	2,671	98.45%	41	1.51%	1	0.04%	2,630	96.94%	2,713
Bossier	2,191	97.51%	56	2.49%			2,135	95.02%	2,247
Caddo	12,159	89.71%	1,309	9.66%	85	0.63%	10,850	80.06%	13,553
Calcasieu	6,105	89.71%	678	9.96%	22	0.32%	5,427	79.75%	6,805
Caldwell	1,448	93.96%	86	5.58%	7	0.45%	1,362	88.38%	1,541
Cameron	938	98.95%	10	1.05%			928	97.89%	948
Catahoula	1,340	97.88%	29	2.12%			1,311	95.76%	1,369
Claiborne	2,765	97.84%	61	2.16%			2,704	95.68%	2,826
Concordia	999	98.04%	20	1.96%			979	96.07%	1,019
De Soto	2,416	96.45%	87	3.47%	2	0.08%	2,329	92.97%	2,505
East Baton Rouge	6,363	85.51%	1,045	14.04%	33	0.44%	5,318	71.47%	7,441
East Carroll	751	96.90%	24	3.10%			727	93.81%	775
East Feliciana	1,178	94.77%	65	5.23%			1,113	89.54%	1,243
Evangeline	3,115	98.36%	52	1.64%			3,063	96.72%	3,167
Franklin	2,930	97.34%	78	2.59%	2	0.07%	2,852	94.75%	3,010
Grant	1,966	96.00%	81	3.96%	1	0.05%	1,885	92.04%	2,048
Iberia	2,412	75.14%	798	24.86%			1,614	50.28%	3,210
Iberville	1,308	75.26%	430	24.74%			878	50.52%	1,738
Jackson	1,748	98.09%	34	1.91%			1,714	96.18%	1,782
Jefferson	7,395	93.90%	466	5.92%	14	0.18%	6,929	87.99%	7,875
Jefferson Davis	2,308	81.73%	512	18.13%	4	0.14%	1,796	63.60%	2,824
Lafayette	4,019	93.21%	291	6.75%	2	0.05%	3,728	86.46%	4,312
Lafourche	2,623	87.78%	364	12.18%	1	0.03%	2,259	75.60%	2,988
LaSalle	1,738	93.64%	117	6.30%	1	0.05%	1,621	87.34%	1,856
Lincoln	1,908	92.13%	163	7.87%			1,745	84.26%	2,071
Livingston	1,953	95.64%	89	4.36%			1,864	91.28%	2,042
Madison	548	89.11%	67	10.89%			481	78.21%	615
Morehouse	2,014	96.04%	83	3.96%			1,931	92.08%	2,097
Natchitoches	3,458	95.18%	173	4.76%	2	0.06%	3,285	90.42%	3,633
Orleans	85,288	93.87%	5,407	5.95%	165	0.18%	79,881	87.92%	90,860
Ouachita	5,968	92.86%	423	6.58%	36	0.56%	5,545	86.28%	6,427
Plaquemines	1,918	98.06%	38	1.94%			1,880	96.11%	1,956
Pointe Coupee	1,027	94.05%	65	5.95%			962	88.10%	1,092
Rapides	7,578	91.77%	680	8.23%			6,898	83.53%	8,258
Red River	1,661	98.34%	24	1.42%	4	0.24%	1,637	96.92%	1,689
Richland	1,773	97.42%	46	2.53%	1	0.05%	1,727	94.89%	1,820
Sabine	3,008	96.16%	110	3.52%	10	0.32%	2,898	92.65%	3,128
Saint Bernard	1,525	93.50%	106	6.50%			1,419	87.00%	1,631
Saint Charles	1,429	94.08%	86	5.66%	4	0.26%	1,343	88.41%	1,519
Saint Helena	962	97.37%	26	2.63%			936	94.74%	988
Saint James	1,715	87.72%	240	12.28%			1,475	75.45%	1,955
Saint John the Baptist	799	79.58%	176	17.53%	29	2.89%	623	62.05%	1,004
Saint Landry	3,766	92.69%	297	7.31%			3,469	85.38%	4,063
Saint Martin	1,420	92.99%	107	7.01%			1,313	85.99%	1,527
Saint Mary	2,072	81.41%	473	18.59%			1,599	62.83%	2,545
Saint Tammany	3,206	94.60%	178	5.25%	5	0.15%	3,028	89.35%	3,389
Tangipahoa	4,404	90.58%	455	9.36%	3	0.06%	3,949	81.22%	4,862
Tensas	635	95.49%	29	4.36%	1	0.15%	606	91.13%	665
Terrebonne	2,126	90.82%	215	9.18%			1,911	81.63%	2,341
Union	2,285	97.52%	58	2.48%			2,227	95.05%	2,343
Vermilion	2,945	91.63%	269	8.37%			2,676	83.26%	3,214
Vernon	2,868	96.60%	46	1.55%	55	1.85%	2,822	95.05%	2,969
Washington	3,997	93.37%	283	6.61%	1	0.02%	3,714	86.76%	4,281
Webster	3,020	97.64%	73	2.36%			2,947	95.28%	3,093
West Baton Rouge	593	86.07%	96	13.93%			497	72.13%	689
West Carroll	1,471	97.94%	31	2.06%			1,440	95.87%	1,502
West Feliciana	557	91.91%	49	8.09%			508	83.83%	606
Winn	2,172	96.71%	36	1.60%	38	1.69%	2,136	95.10%	2,246
Totals	249,418	92.79%	18,853	7.01%	533	0.20%	230,565	85.77%	268,804

== See also ==
- United States presidential elections in Louisiana
