= 1848 United States presidential election in Louisiana =

- November 7, 1848
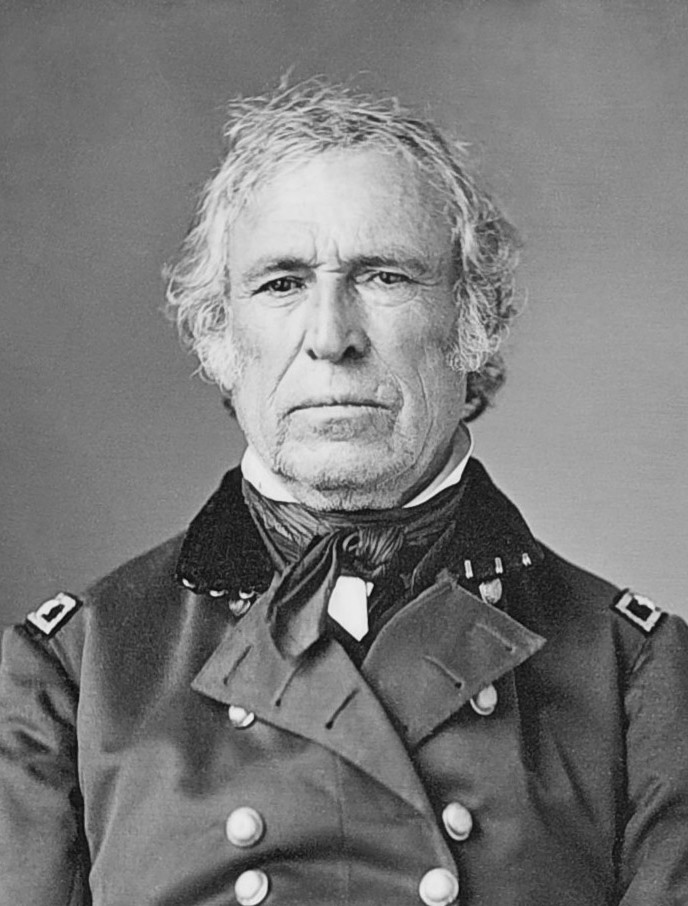

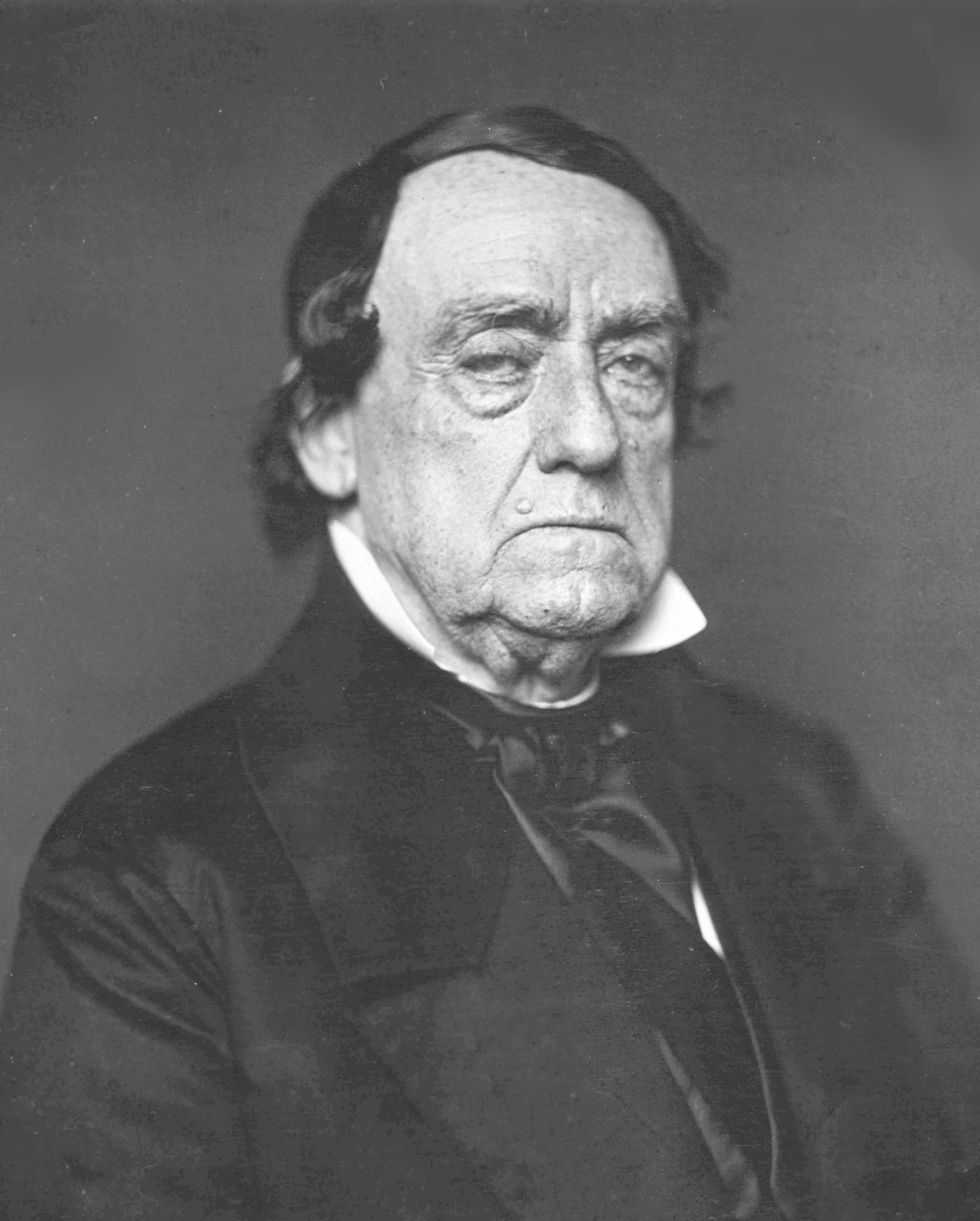
Nominee	Zachary Taylor	Lewis Cass
Party	Whig	Democratic
Home state	Louisiana	Michigan
Running mate	Millard Fillmore	William O. Butler
Electoral vote	6	0
Popular vote	18,487	15,379
Percentage	54.59%	45.41%
Parish results
Taylor
50–60%
60–70%
70–80%
80–90%
Cass
50–60%
60–70%
80–90%
No Data/Vote
President before election
James K. Polk
Democratic
Elected President
Zachary Taylor
Whig

The 1848 United States presidential election in Louisiana took place on November 7, 1848, as part of the 1848 United States presidential election. Voters chose six representatives, or electors to the Electoral College, who voted for President and Vice President.

Louisiana voted for the Whig candidate, Zachary Taylor, over Democratic candidate Lewis Cass. Taylor won Louisiana by a margin of 9.18%.

== Results ==
1848 United States presidential election in Louisiana
Party	Candidate	Running mate	Popular vote		Electoral vote	
Party	Candidate	Running mate	Count	%	Count	%
Whig	Zachary Taylor of Louisiana	Millard Fillmore of New York	18,487	54.59%	6	100.00%
Democratic	Lewis Cass of Michigan	William O. Butler of Kentucky	15,379	45.41%	0	0.00%
Total			33,866	100.00%	6	100.00%

== See also ==
- United States presidential elections in Louisiana
