= 1844 United States presidential election in Louisiana =

- November 5, 1844

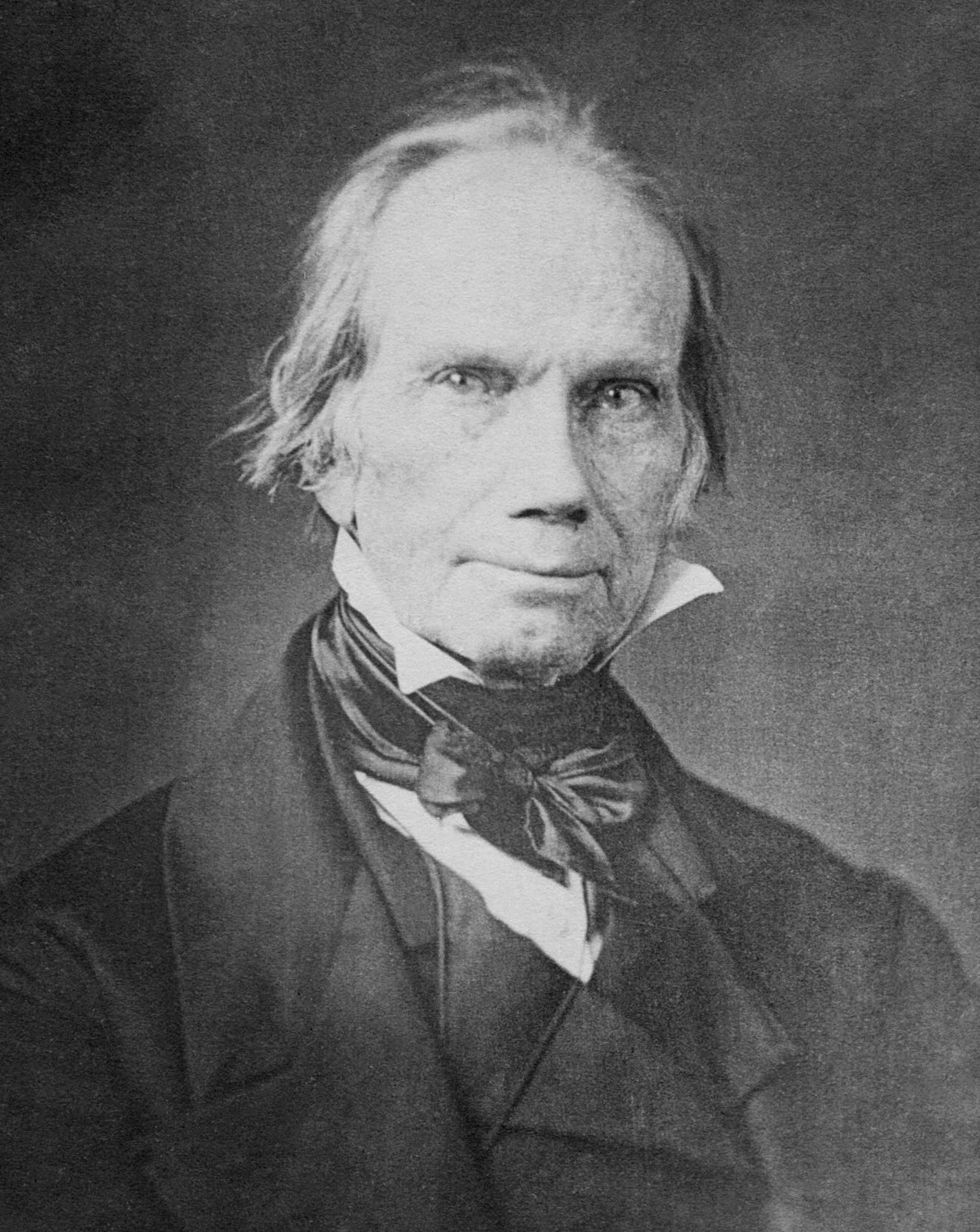
Nominee	James K. Polk	Henry Clay
Party	Democratic	Whig
Home state	Tennessee	Kentucky
Running mate	George M. Dallas	Theodore Frelinghuysen
Electoral vote	6	0
Popular vote	13,782	13,083
Percentage	51.30%	48.70%
Parish results
Polk
50–60%
60–70%
70–80%
90–100%
Clay
50–60%
60–70%
70–80%
No Data/Vote
President before election
John Tyler
Independent
Elected President
James K. Polk
Democratic

A presidential election was held in Louisiana on November 5, 1844 as part of the 1844 United States presidential election. Voters chose six representatives, or electors to the Electoral College, who voted for President and Vice President.

Louisiana voted for the Democratic candidate, James K. Polk, over Whig candidate Henry Clay. Polk won Louisiana by a narrow margin of 2.6%.

== Results ==
1844 United States presidential election in Louisiana
Party	Candidate	Running mate	Popular vote		Electoral vote	
Party	Candidate	Running mate	Count	%	Count	%
Democratic	James K. Polk of Tennessee	George M. Dallas of Pennsylvania	13,782	51.30%	6	100.00%
Whig	Henry Clay of Kentucky	Theodore Frelinghuysen of New York	13,083	48.70%	0	0.00%
Total			26,865	100.00%	6	100.00%

== See also ==
- United States presidential elections in Louisiana
