= 1904 United States presidential election in Louisiana =

- November 8, 1904
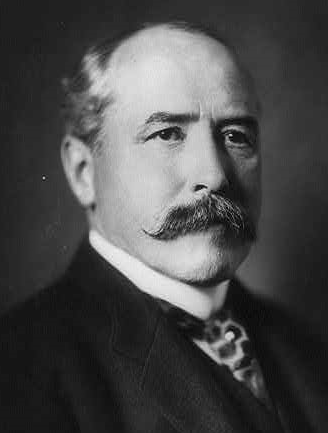

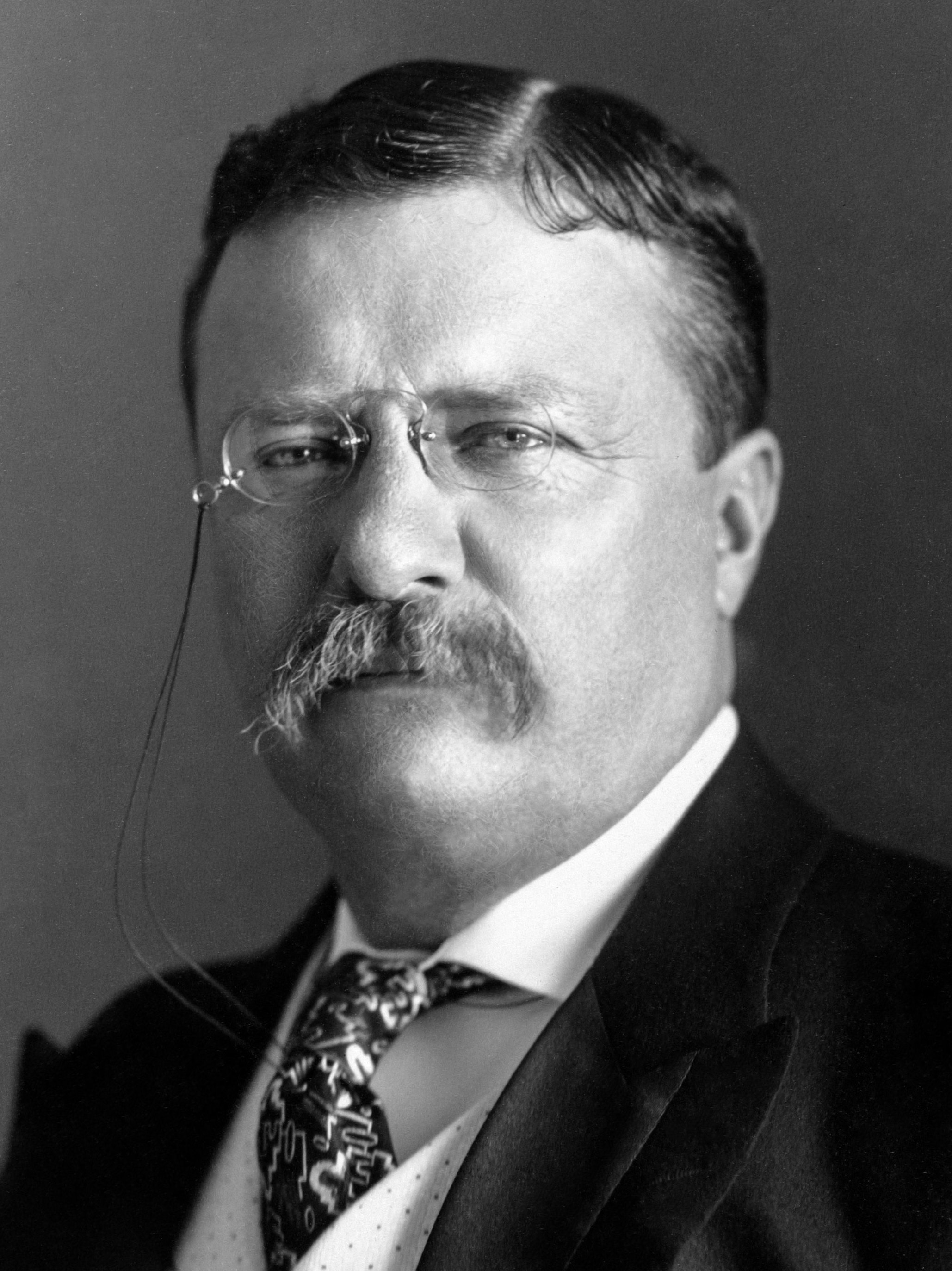
| Nominee | Alton B. Parker | Theodore Roosevelt |
| Party | Democratic | Republican |
| Home state | New York | New York |
| Running mate | Henry G. Davis | Charles W. Fairbanks |
| Electoral vote | 9 | 0 |
| Popular vote | 47,708 | 5,205 |
| Percentage | 88.50% | 9.66% |
Parish results
Parker
60–70%
70–80%
80–90%
90–100%
President before election
Theodore Roosevelt
Republican
Elected President
Theodore Roosevelt
Republican

The 1904 United States presidential election in Louisiana took place on November 8, 1904. All contemporary 45 states were part of the 1904 United States presidential election. State voters chose nine electors to the Electoral College, which selected the president and vice president.

Following the overthrow of Reconstruction Republican government, Louisiana, like most of the former Confederacy, established a Democratic-dominated but highly fraudulent political system that would from 1890 be challenged by the rise of the Populist Party due to declining conditions for farmers. Both the Populists and the earlier Greenback Party — who shared key leaders like James B. Weaver — would be supported by the state Republican Party, and in the 1896 gubernatorial election a fusion candidate was undoubtedly denied by the continued fraud. Consequently, the state's plantation elite radically rewrote the state's constitution in the next gubernatorial term with a poll tax, literacy test, grandfather clause, and a secret ballot. The consequence was a reduction in the number of registered black voters by 96 percent, and virtual elimination of black voting in Acadiana until the 1950s. (Note: In the remainder of the state most blacks were already disenfranchised by intimidation before the 1898 Constitution and few voted again until after the Voting Rights Act of 1965.)

Louisiana consequently became a one-party state dominated by the Democratic Party, as the now-moribund Republican party lacked any white base because Louisiana completely lacked upland or German refugee whites opposed to secession. After 1900, not until 1964 would another Republican serve in the state legislature.

Despite this absolute single-party dominance, non-partisan tendencies remained strong among wealthy sugar planters in Acadiana, within the business elite of New Orleans, and even amongst the “lily-white” “National Republican” GOP faction who supported black disenfranchisement in an effort to become respectable amongst the white elite. State politics became controlled by the Choctaw Club of Louisiana, generally called the “Old Regulars”. This political machine was based in New Orleans and united with Black Belt cotton planters. Although white Republicans continued to work towards taking over Federal patronage from the “black and tans”, throughout most of the 1900s Louisiana politics was under firm Choctaw control as the Populist movement weakened with the disenfranchisement of many poor whites via the poll tax.

Louisiana was won by the Democratic nominees, Chief Judge Alton B. Parker of New York and his running mate Henry G. Davis of West Virginia. They defeated the Republican nominees, incumbent President Theodore Roosevelt of New York and his running mate Charles W. Fairbanks of Indiana. Parker won the state by a landslide margin of 78.84%.

With 88.5 percent of the popular vote, Louisiana would be Parker's third strongest victory in terms of percentage in the popular vote after South Carolina and neighboring Mississippi.

== Results ==
1904 United States presidential election in Louisiana
| Party | Candidate | Votes | Percentage | Electoral votes |
|---|---|---|---|---|
| Democratic | Alton B. Parker | 47,708 | 88.50% | 9 |
| Republican | Theodore Roosevelt (incumbent) | 5,205 | 9.66% | 0 |
| Social Democratic | Eugene V. Debs | 995 | 1.85% | 0 |
| Totals | | 53,908 | 100.00% | 9 |
| Voter turnout | | | | — |

=== Results by parish ===
1904 United States presidential election in Louisiana by parish
| Parish | Alton Parker Democratic | | Theodore Roosevelt Republican | | Eugene Debs Social Democratic | | Margin | | Total votes cast |
| Parish | # | % | # | % | # | % | # | % | Total votes cast |
|---|---|---|---|---|---|---|---|---|---|
| Acadia | 626 | 77.09% | 133 | 16.38% | 53 | 6.53% | 493 | 60.71% | 812 |
| Ascension | 504 | 74.12% | 175 | 25.74% | 1 | 0.15% | 329 | 48.38% | 680 |
| Assumption | 592 | 78.72% | 160 | 21.28% | 0 | 0.00% | 432 | 57.45% | 752 |
| Avoyelles | 1,054 | 95.30% | 37 | 3.35% | 15 | 1.36% | 1,017 | 91.95% | 1,106 |
| Bienville | 833 | 93.81% | 44 | 4.95% | 11 | 1.24% | 789 | 88.85% | 888 |
| Bossier | 475 | 97.94% | 10 | 2.06% | 0 | 0.00% | 465 | 95.88% | 485 |
| Caddo | 1,592 | 96.95% | 47 | 2.86% | 3 | 0.18% | 1,545 | 94.09% | 1,642 |
| Calcasieu | 1,102 | 69.48% | 401 | 25.28% | 83 | 5.23% | 701 | 44.20% | 1,586 |
| Caldwell | 198 | 91.67% | 16 | 7.41% | 2 | 0.93% | 182 | 84.26% | 216 |
| Cameron | 178 | 90.82% | 15 | 7.65% | 3 | 1.53% | 163 | 83.16% | 196 |
| Catahoula | 514 | 79.32% | 124 | 19.14% | 10 | 1.54% | 390 | 60.19% | 648 |
| Claiborne | 708 | 97.52% | 16 | 2.20% | 2 | 0.28% | 692 | 95.32% | 726 |
| Concordia | 209 | 95.00% | 2 | 0.91% | 9 | 4.09% | 200 (Note: In this parish where Debs ran second ahead of Roosevelt, margin given is Parker vote minus Debs vote and percentage margin Parker percentage minus Debs percentage.) | 90.91% | 220 |
| De Soto | 908 | 97.63% | 9 | 0.97% | 13 | 1.40% | 895 | 96.24% | 930 |
| East Baton Rouge | 994 | 95.30% | 48 | 4.60% | 1 | 0.10% | 946 | 90.70% | 1,043 |
| East Carroll | 211 | 99.06% | 2 | 0.94% | 0 | 0.00% | 209 | 98.12% | 213 |
| East Feliciana | 388 | 97.73% | 7 | 1.76% | 2 | 0.50% | 381 | 95.97% | 397 |
| Franklin | 347 | 98.30% | 5 | 1.42% | 1 | 0.28% | 342 | 96.88% | 353 |
| Grant | 280 | 74.47% | 71 | 18.88% | 25 | 6.65% | 209 | 55.59% | 376 |
| Iberia | 734 | 76.30% | 205 | 21.31% | 23 | 2.39% | 529 | 54.99% | 962 |
| Iberville | 515 | 87.73% | 72 | 12.27% | 0 | 0.00% | 443 | 75.47% | 587 |
| Jackson | 576 | 91.00% | 53 | 8.37% | 4 | 0.63% | 523 | 82.62% | 633 |
| Jefferson | 1,110 | 97.11% | 25 | 2.19% | 8 | 0.70% | 1,085 | 94.93% | 1,143 |
| Lafayette | 496 | 88.89% | 41 | 7.35% | 21 | 3.76% | 455 | 81.54% | 558 |
| Lafourche | 931 | 84.56% | 168 | 15.26% | 2 | 0.18% | 763 | 69.30% | 1,101 |
| Lincoln | 532 | 94.66% | 26 | 4.63% | 4 | 0.71% | 506 | 90.04% | 562 |
| Livingston | 358 | 88.18% | 47 | 11.58% | 1 | 0.25% | 311 | 76.60% | 406 |
| Madison | 150 | 100.00% | 0 | 0.00% | 0 | 0.00% | 150 | 100.00% | 150 |
| Morehouse | 526 | 96.16% | 20 | 3.66% | 1 | 0.18% | 506 | 92.50% | 547 |
| Natchitoches | 630 | 83.44% | 125 | 16.56% | 0 | 0.00% | 505 | 66.89% | 755 |
| Orleans | 16,103 | 89.65% | 1,380 | 7.68% | 480 | 2.67% | 14,723 | 81.96% | 17,963 |
| Ouachita | 669 | 94.36% | 26 | 3.67% | 14 | 1.97% | 643 | 90.69% | 709 |
| Plaquemines | 620 | 93.09% | 38 | 5.71% | 8 | 1.20% | 582 | 87.39% | 666 |
| Pointe Coupee | 505 | 98.06% | 10 | 1.94% | 0 | 0.00% | 495 | 96.12% | 515 |
| Rapides | 827 | 87.61% | 107 | 11.33% | 10 | 1.06% | 720 | 76.27% | 944 |
| Red River | 371 | 94.64% | 12 | 3.06% | 9 | 2.30% | 359 | 91.58% | 392 |
| Richland | 291 | 97.65% | 7 | 2.35% | 0 | 0.00% | 284 | 95.30% | 298 |
| Sabine | 504 | 87.80% | 58 | 10.10% | 12 | 2.09% | 446 | 77.70% | 574 |
| Saint Bernard | 424 | 92.58% | 34 | 7.42% | 0 | 0.00% | 390 | 85.15% | 458 |
| Saint Charles | 313 | 96.31% | 12 | 3.69% | 0 | 0.00% | 301 | 92.62% | 325 |
| Saint Helena | 234 | 88.30% | 30 | 11.32% | 1 | 0.38% | 204 | 76.98% | 265 |
| Saint James | 327 | 72.67% | 99 | 22.00% | 24 | 5.33% | 228 | 50.67% | 450 |
| Saint John the Baptist | 283 | 91.88% | 24 | 7.79% | 1 | 0.32% | 259 | 84.09% | 308 |
| Saint Landry | 887 | 92.88% | 60 | 6.28% | 8 | 0.84% | 827 | 86.60% | 955 |
| Saint Martin | 613 | 96.38% | 23 | 3.62% | 0 | 0.00% | 590 | 92.77% | 636 |
| Saint Mary | 749 | 79.18% | 193 | 20.40% | 4 | 0.42% | 556 | 58.77% | 946 |
| Saint Tammany | 453 | 83.27% | 59 | 10.85% | 32 | 5.88% | 394 | 72.43% | 544 |
| Tangipahoa | 623 | 77.39% | 170 | 21.12% | 12 | 1.49% | 453 | 56.27% | 805 |
| Tensas | 203 | 97.13% | 6 | 2.87% | 0 | 0.00% | 197 | 94.26% | 209 |
| Terrebonne | 702 | 82.49% | 144 | 16.92% | 5 | 0.59% | 558 | 65.57% | 851 |
| Union | 496 | 96.88% | 15 | 2.93% | 1 | 0.20% | 481 | 93.95% | 512 |
| Vermilion | 792 | 86.65% | 111 | 12.14% | 11 | 1.20% | 681 | 74.51% | 914 |
| Vernon | 469 | 61.31% | 275 | 35.95% | 21 | 2.75% | 194 | 25.36% | 765 |
| Washington | 367 | 90.84% | 36 | 8.91% | 1 | 0.25% | 331 | 81.93% | 404 |
| Webster | 698 | 97.08% | 21 | 2.92% | 0 | 0.00% | 677 | 94.16% | 719 |
| West Baton Rouge | 233 | 97.90% | 5 | 2.10% | 0 | 0.00% | 228 | 95.80% | 238 |
| West Carroll | 124 | 89.86% | 5 | 3.62% | 9 | 6.52% | 115 | 83.33% | 138 |
| West Feliciana | 319 | 96.08% | 13 | 3.92% | 0 | 0.00% | 306 | 92.17% | 332 |
| Winn | 277 | 63.10% | 128 | 29.16% | 34 | 7.74% | 149 | 33.94% | 439 |
| Totals | 47,747 | 88.51% | 5,205 | 9.65% | 995 | 1.84% | 42,542 | 78.86% | 53,947 |

== See also ==
- United States presidential elections in Louisiana
