= 1828 United States presidential election in Louisiana =

- October 31 – December 2, 1828

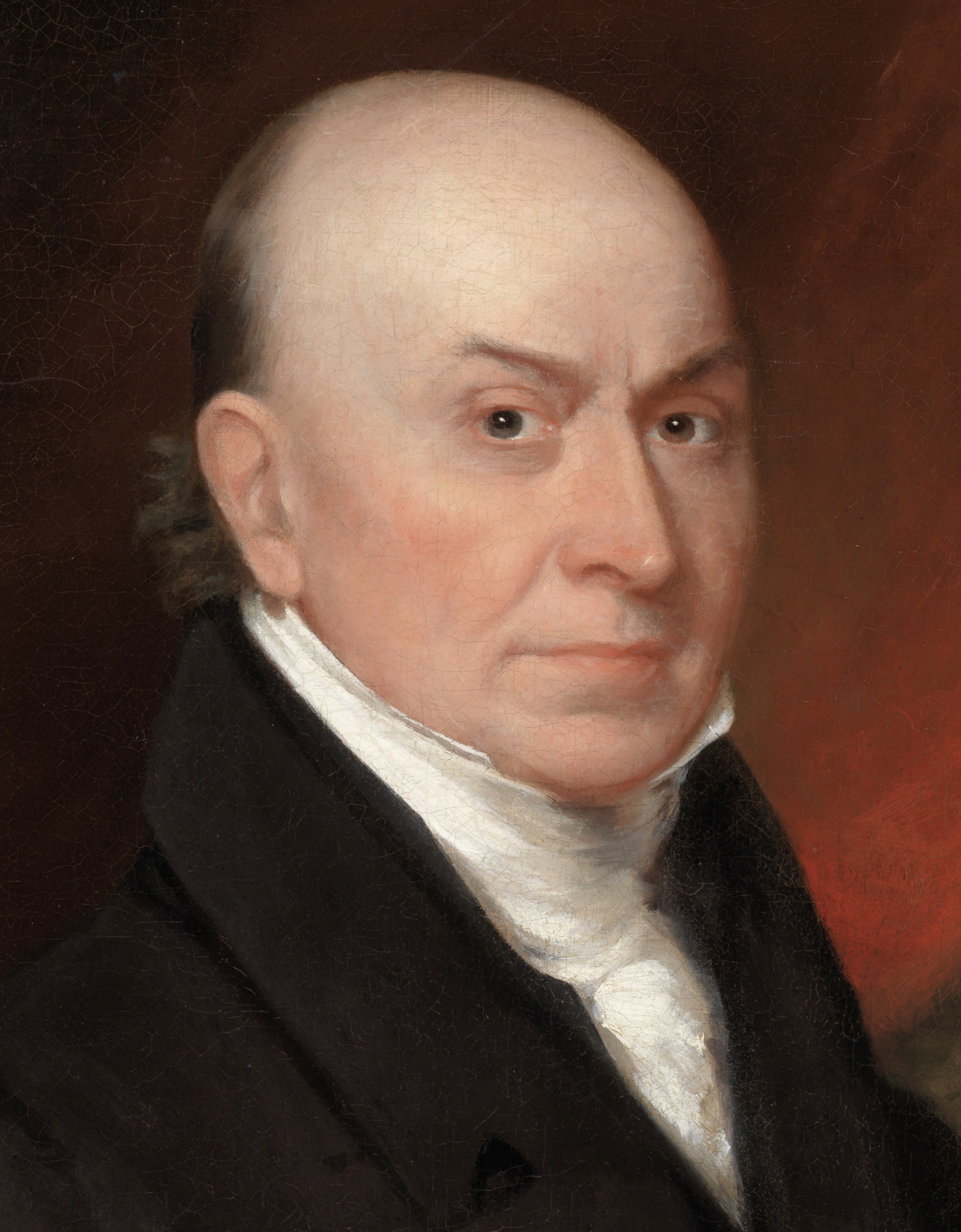
Nominee	Andrew Jackson	John Quincy Adams
Party	Democratic	National Republican
Home state	Tennessee	Massachusetts
Running mate	John C. Calhoun	Richard Rush
Electoral vote	5	0
Popular vote	4,605	4,082
Percentage	53.01%	46.99%
- County results
President before election
John Quincy Adams
Democratic-Republican
Elected President
Andrew Jackson
Democratic

The 1828 United States presidential election in Louisiana took place between October 31 and December 2, 1828, as part of the 1828 United States presidential election. Voters chose five representatives, or electors to the Electoral College, who voted for President and Vice President.

Louisiana voted for the Democratic candidate, Andrew Jackson, over the National Republican candidate, John Quincy Adams. Jackson won Louisiana by a margin of 6.02%.

In January 1828, Jackson had visited New Orleans to celebrate the 13th anniversary of the Battle of New Orleans in response to an invitation from the Louisiana legislature; he and his supporters financed the visit, as the legislature rejected providing any money, and lingering anger against Jackson's conduct in 1815 prompted the legislature to disclaim any adherence to Jackson as a political candidate. The legislature remained dominated by Adams supporters. His supporters had a mixed record in the fall elections, winning the governor's mansion and the legislature but losing two seats in the federal House of Representatives. And while the presidential election ultimately saw Adams defeated in Louisiana, it was a slim defeat, in contrast to nearly unanimous support for Jackson throughout the other southern states.

== Results ==
1828 United States presidential election in Louisiana
Party	Candidate	Votes	Percentage	Electoral votes
Democratic	Andrew Jackson	4,605	53.01%	5
National Republican	John Quincy Adams (incumbent)	4,082	46.99%	0
Totals		8,687	100.0%	5

== See also ==
- United States presidential elections in Louisiana
