= 1836 United States presidential election in Louisiana =

- November 8, 1836
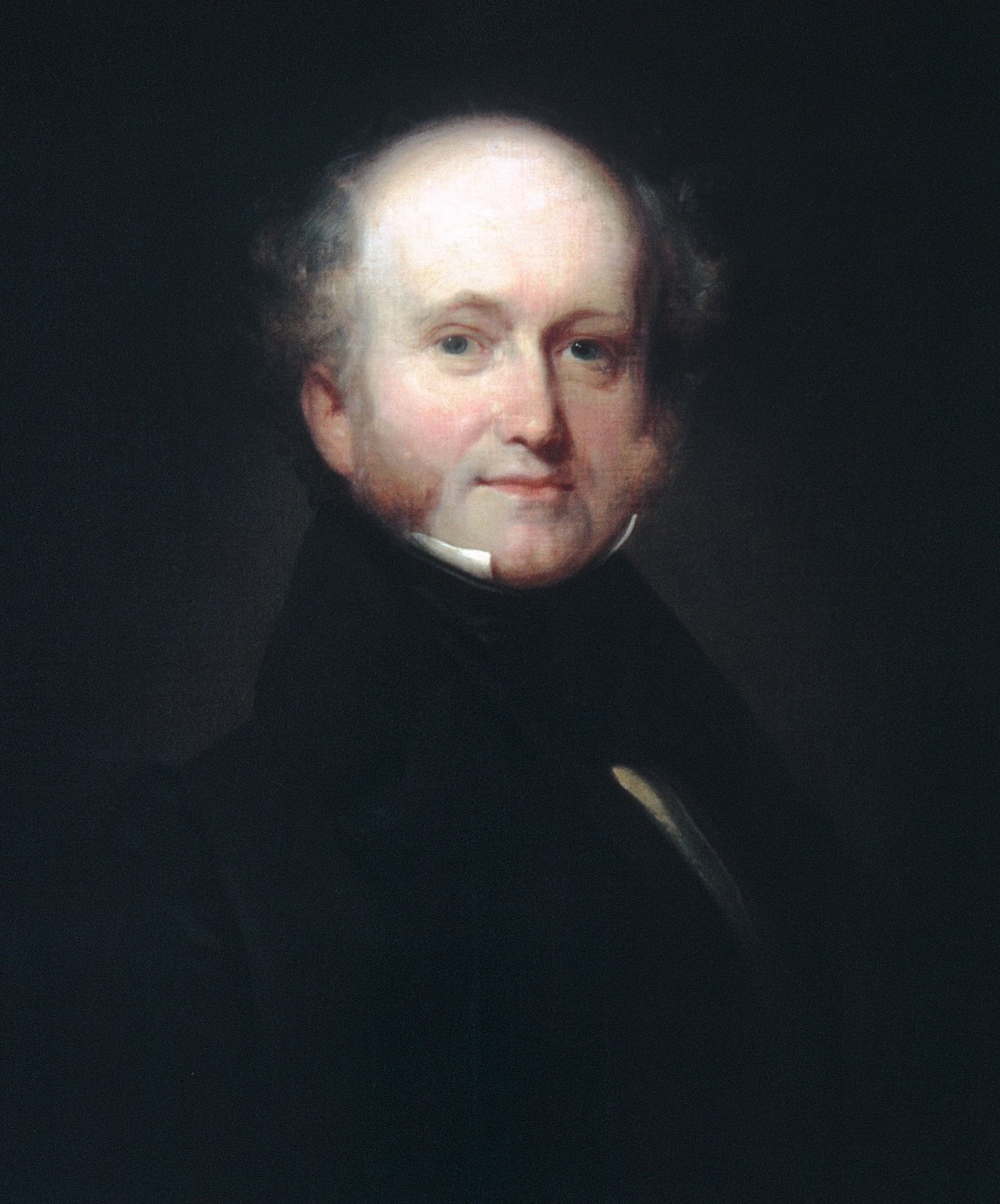

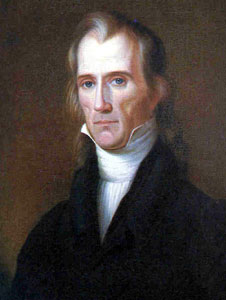
| Nominee | Martin Van Buren | Hugh Lawson White |
| Party | Democratic | Whig |
| Home state | New York | Tennessee |
| Running mate | Richard Mentor Johnson | John Tyler |
| Electoral vote | 5 | 0 |
| Popular vote | 3,842 | 3,583 |
| Percentage | 51.74% | 48.26% |
Parish results
Van Buren
50–60%
60–70%
70–80%
80–90%
90–100%
White
50–60%
60–70%
70–80%
80–90%
Tie/No Data
President before election
Andrew Jackson
Democratic
Elected President
Martin Van Buren
Democratic

A presidential election was held in Louisiana on November 8, 1836 as part of the 1836 United States presidential election. Voters chose five representatives, or electors to the Electoral College, who voted for President and Vice President.

Louisiana voted for the Democratic candidate, Martin Van Buren, over Whig candidate Hugh Lawson White. Van Buren won Louisiana by a narrow margin of 3.48%.

== Results ==
1836 United States presidential election in Louisiana
| Party | Candidate | Votes | Percentage | Electoral votes |
|---|---|---|---|---|
| Democratic | Martin Van Buren | 3,842 | 51.74% | 5 |
| Whig | Hugh Lawson White | 3,583 | 48.26% | 0 |
| Totals | | 7,425 | 100.0% | 5 |

== See also ==
- United States presidential elections in Louisiana
