= 1892 United States presidential election in Louisiana =

- November 8, 1892

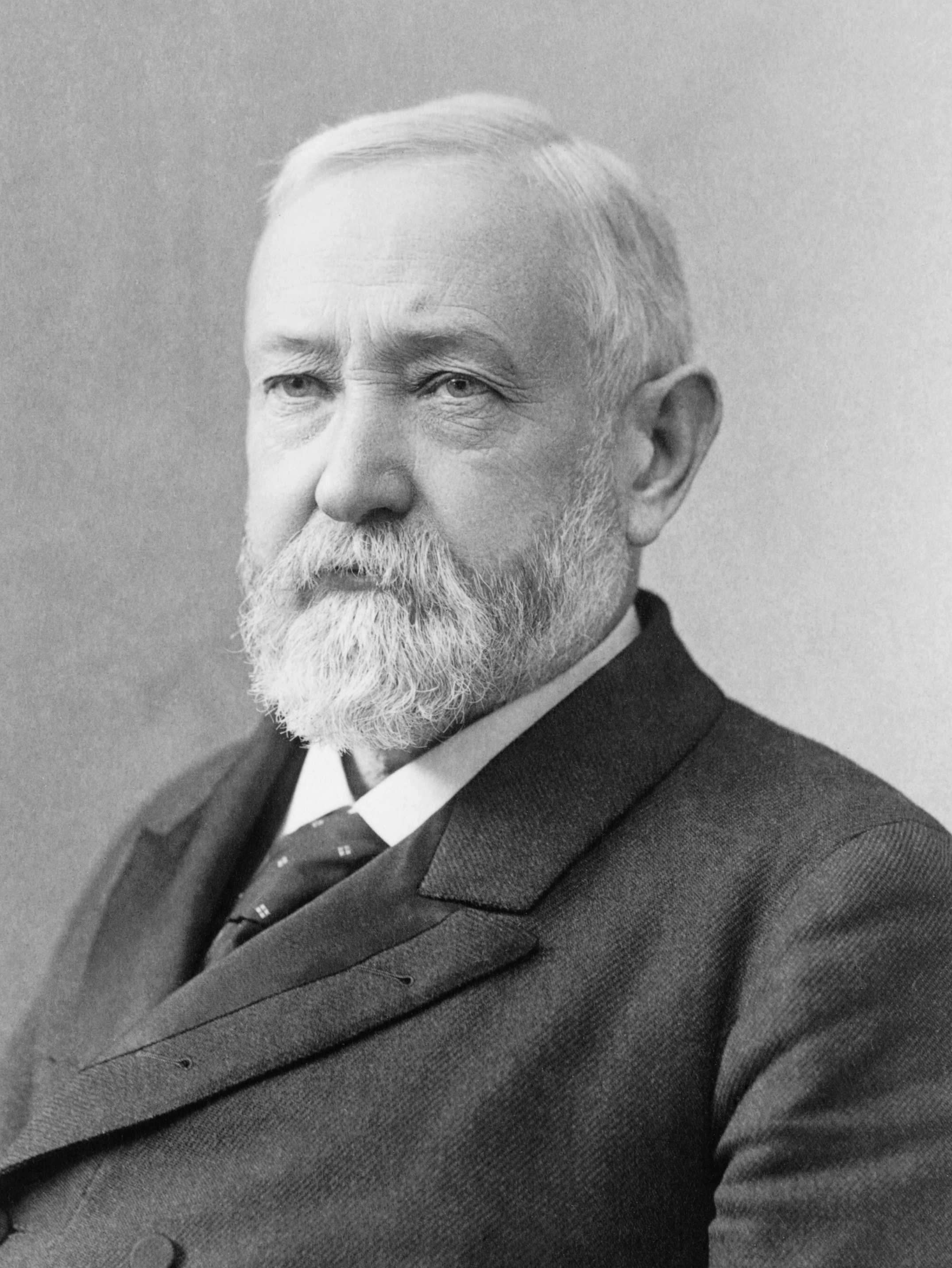
| Nominee | Grover Cleveland | Benjamin Harrison |
| Party | Democratic | Republican |
| Alliance | | Populist |
| Home state | New York | Indiana |
| Running mate | Adlai Stevenson I | Whitelaw Reid |
| Electoral vote | 8 | 0 |
| Popular vote | 87,926 | 26,963 |
| Percentage | 76.53% | 23.47% |
Parish results
Cleveland
50–60%
60–70%
70–80%
80–90%
90–100%
Harrison
50–60%
60–70%
70–80%
President before election
Benjamin Harrison
Republican
Elected President
Grover Cleveland
Democratic

The 1892 United States presidential election in Louisiana took place on November 8, 1892. All contemporary 44 states were part of the 1892 United States presidential election. State voters chose eight electors to the Electoral College, which selected the president and vice president.

Following the overthrow of Reconstruction Republican government, Louisiana, like most of the former Confederacy, established a Democratic-dominated but highly fraudulent political system in which the dominant Bourbon planter class used the newly enfranchised blacks to protect their power against potentially threatening poor whites. Outside of Acadiana — where French Catholic beliefs produced less hardline attitudes towards black voting — intimidation would soon drastically reduce the number of black voters or, alternatively, count them for Democrats hostile to their interests.

By the 1890s the Louisiana Republican Party was deeply divided between the establishment “black and tans” and an insurgent “lily white” faction led by Acadian sugar planters. At the same time, there were major splits amongst the state's white electorate, formerly solidly Democratic because Louisiana completely lacked upland or German refugee whites opposed to secession. The major parties would be challenged in the predominantly white hill parishes by the rise of the Populist Party due to declining conditions for farmers. Both the Populists and the earlier Greenback Party — who shared key leaders like James B. Weaver — would eventually be supported by the state Republican Party, but only after a five-way 1892 gubernatorial race won by “Anti-Lottery Democrat” Murphy J. Foster. This support would mean that Weaver would be absent from Louisiana's presidential ballot later in the year, and the state would be won by the Democratic nominees, former President Grover Cleveland of New York and his running mate Adlai Stevenson I of Illinois. Although Cleveland won Louisiana by a landslide 53.06 percentage point margin, Populist support helped the Republicans carry several previously unanimously Democratic northern hill parishes. However, this would prove the last time the Republicans won any parish in the state outside Acadiana until 1952, and the last time a parish outside Acadiana voted against the Democrats until 1948.

== Results ==
1892 United States presidential election in Louisiana
| Party | Candidate | Votes | Percentage | Electoral votes |
|---|---|---|---|---|
| Democratic | Grover Cleveland | 87,926 | 76.53% | 8 |
| Republican | Benjamin Harrison (incumbent) | 26,963 | 23.47% | 0 |
| Totals | | 114,889 | 100.00% | 8 |
| Voter turnout | | | | — |

=== Results by parish ===
1892 United States presidential election in Louisiana by parish
| Parish | Stephen Grover Cleveland Democratic | | Benjamin Harrison Republican | | Margin | | Total votes cast |
| Parish | # | % | # | % | # | % | Total votes cast |
|---|---|---|---|---|---|---|---|
| Acadia | 258 | 69.35% | 114 | 30.65% | 144 | 38.71% | 372 |
| Ascension | 2,099 | 90.91% | 210 | 9.09% | 1,889 | 81.81% | 2,309 |
| Assumption | 1,276 | 63.51% | 733 | 36.49% | 543 | 27.03% | 2,009 |
| Avoyelles | 1,696 | 93.14% | 125 | 6.86% | 1,571 | 86.27% | 1,821 |
| Bienville | 1,620 | 78.53% | 443 | 21.47% | 1,177 | 57.05% | 2,063 |
| Bossier | 2,914 | 97.88% | 63 | 2.12% | 2,851 | 95.77% | 2,977 |
| Caddo | 2,252 | 90.55% | 235 | 9.45% | 2,017 | 81.10% | 2,487 |
| Calcasieu | 1,089 | 61.98% | 668 | 38.02% | 421 | 23.96% | 1,757 |
| Caldwell | 670 | 74.12% | 234 | 25.88% | 436 | 48.23% | 904 |
| Cameron | 184 | 97.35% | 5 | 2.65% | 179 | 94.71% | 189 |
| Catahoula | 1,081 | 71.12% | 439 | 28.88% | 642 | 42.24% | 1,520 |
| Claiborne | 1,444 | 55.30% | 1,167 | 44.70% | 277 | 10.61% | 2,611 |
| Concordia | 3,593 | 99.09% | 33 | 0.91% | 3,560 | 98.18% | 3,626 |
| De Soto | 1,598 | 84.51% | 293 | 15.49% | 1,305 | 69.01% | 1,891 |
| East Baton Rouge | 1,372 | 68.19% | 640 | 31.81% | 732 | 36.38% | 2,012 |
| East Carroll | 1,289 | 97.36% | 35 | 2.64% | 1,254 | 94.71% | 1,324 |
| East Feliciana | 1,355 | 93.38% | 96 | 6.62% | 1,259 | 86.77% | 1,451 |
| Franklin | 796 | 96.84% | 26 | 3.16% | 770 | 93.67% | 822 |
| Grant | 206 | 28.41% | 519 | 71.59% | -313 | -43.17% | 725 |
| Iberia | 576 | 97.79% | 13 | 2.21% | 563 | 95.59% | 589 |
| Iberville | 1,609 | 70.88% | 661 | 29.12% | 948 | 41.76% | 2,270 |
| Jackson | 396 | 56.41% | 306 | 43.59% | 90 | 12.82% | 702 |
| Jefferson | 1,275 | 84.44% | 235 | 15.56% | 1,040 | 68.87% | 1,510 |
| Lafayette | 664 | 100.00% | 0 | 0.00% | 664 | 100.00% | 664 |
| Lafourche | 2,922 | 93.59% | 200 | 6.41% | 2,722 | 87.19% | 3,122 |
| Lincoln | 695 | 39.29% | 1,074 | 60.71% | -379 | -21.42% | 1,769 |
| Livingston | 333 | 59.68% | 225 | 40.32% | 108 | 19.35% | 558 |
| Madison | 3,433 | 99.51% | 17 | 0.49% | 3,416 | 99.01% | 3,450 |
| Morehouse | 1,176 | 93.48% | 82 | 6.52% | 1,094 | 86.96% | 1,258 |
| Natchitoches | 1,140 | 68.80% | 517 | 31.20% | 623 | 37.60% | 1,657 |
| Orleans | 19,234 | 75.73% | 6,165 | 24.27% | 13,069 | 51.45% | 25,399 |
| Ouachita | 2,701 | 91.03% | 266 | 8.97% | 2,435 | 82.07% | 2,967 |
| Plaquemines | 927 | 44.89% | 1,138 | 55.11% | -211 | -10.22% | 2,065 |
| Pointe Coupee | 893 | 73.44% | 323 | 26.56% | 570 | 46.88% | 1,216 |
| Rapides | 3,446 | 88.07% | 467 | 11.93% | 2,979 | 76.13% | 3,913 |
| Red River | 927 | 74.34% | 320 | 25.66% | 607 | 48.68% | 1,247 |
| Richland | 882 | 99.55% | 4 | 0.45% | 878 | 99.10% | 886 |
| Sabine | 509 | 39.98% | 764 | 60.02% | -255 | -20.03% | 1,273 |
| Saint Bernard | 449 | 69.61% | 196 | 30.39% | 253 | 39.22% | 645 |
| Saint Charles | 345 | 32.89% | 704 | 67.11% | -359 | -34.22% | 1,049 |
| Saint Helena | 306 | 79.90% | 77 | 20.10% | 229 | 59.79% | 383 |
| Saint James | 575 | 42.22% | 787 | 57.78% | -212 | -15.57% | 1,362 |
| Saint John the Baptist | 503 | 31.03% | 1,118 | 68.97% | -615 | -37.94% | 1,621 |
| Saint Landry | 1,136 | 55.28% | 919 | 44.72% | 217 | 10.56% | 2,055 |
| Saint Martin | 491 | 97.42% | 13 | 2.58% | 478 | 94.84% | 504 |
| Saint Mary | 1,311 | 82.19% | 284 | 17.81% | 1,027 | 64.39% | 1,595 |
| Saint Tammany | 501 | 67.70% | 239 | 32.30% | 262 | 35.41% | 740 |
| Tangipahoa | 786 | 85.62% | 132 | 14.38% | 654 | 71.24% | 918 |
| Tensas | 2,351 | 91.69% | 213 | 8.31% | 2,138 | 83.39% | 2,564 |
| Terrebonne | 1,210 | 67.64% | 579 | 32.36% | 631 | 35.27% | 1,789 |
| Union | 1,216 | 59.26% | 836 | 40.74% | 380 | 18.52% | 2,052 |
| Vermilion | 316 | 58.74% | 222 | 41.26% | 94 | 17.47% | 538 |
| Vernon | 361 | 51.28% | 343 | 48.72% | 18 | 2.56% | 704 |
| Washington | 399 | 73.62% | 143 | 26.38% | 256 | 47.23% | 542 |
| Webster | 1,441 | 83.34% | 288 | 16.66% | 1,153 | 66.69% | 1,729 |
| West Baton Rouge | 1,487 | 86.76% | 227 | 13.24% | 1,260 | 73.51% | 1,714 |
| West Carroll | 408 | 99.76% | 1 | 0.24% | 407 | 99.51% | 409 |
| West Feliciana | 1,593 | 100.00% | 0 | 0.00% | 1,593 | 100.00% | 1,593 |
| Winn | 211 | 21.14% | 787 | 78.86% | -576 | -57.72% | 998 |
| Totals | 87,926 | 76.53% | 26,963 | 23.47% | 60,963 | 53.06% | 114,889 |

== See also ==
- United States presidential elections in Louisiana
