= 1840 United States presidential election in Louisiana =

- November 3, 1840
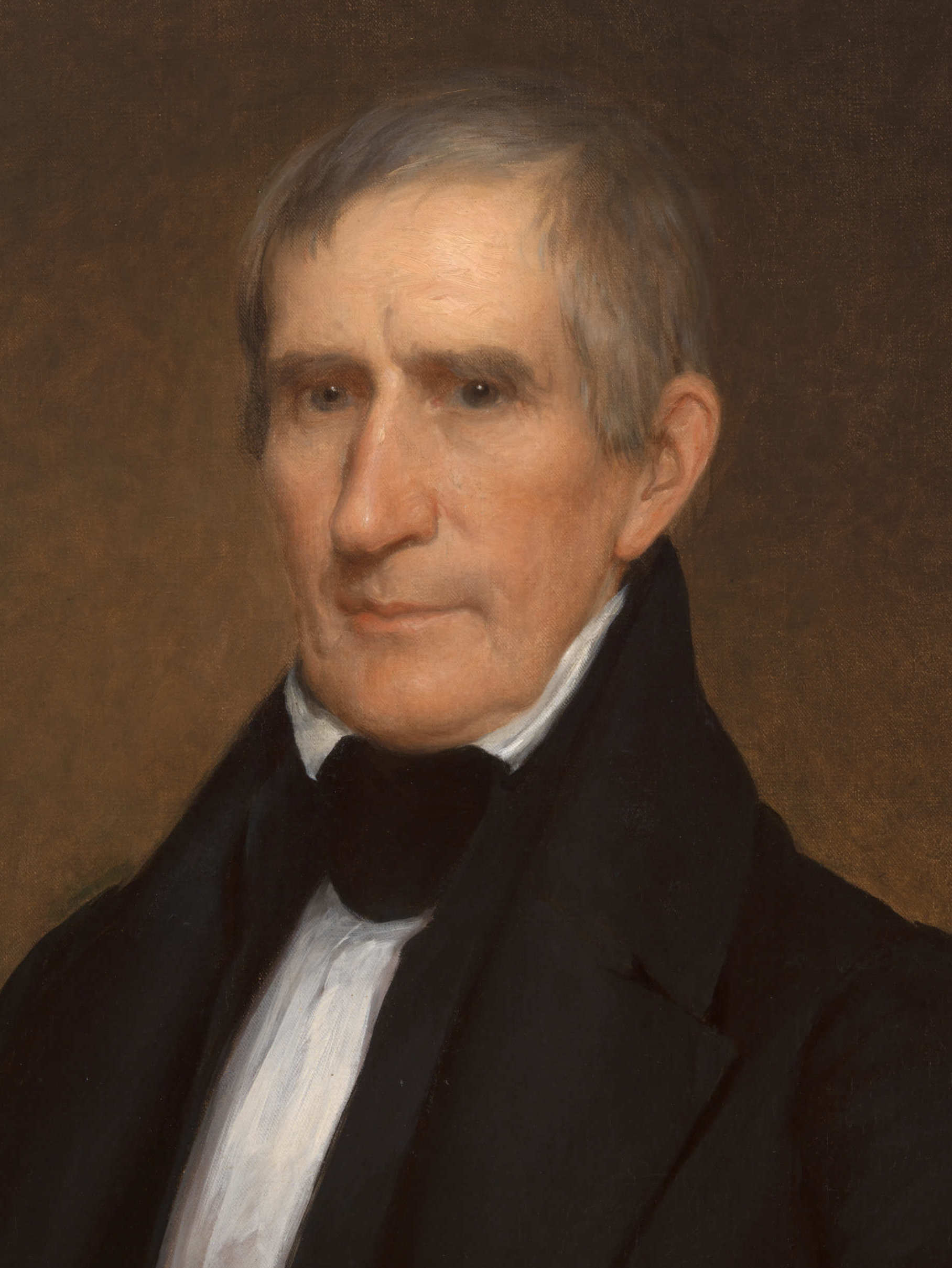

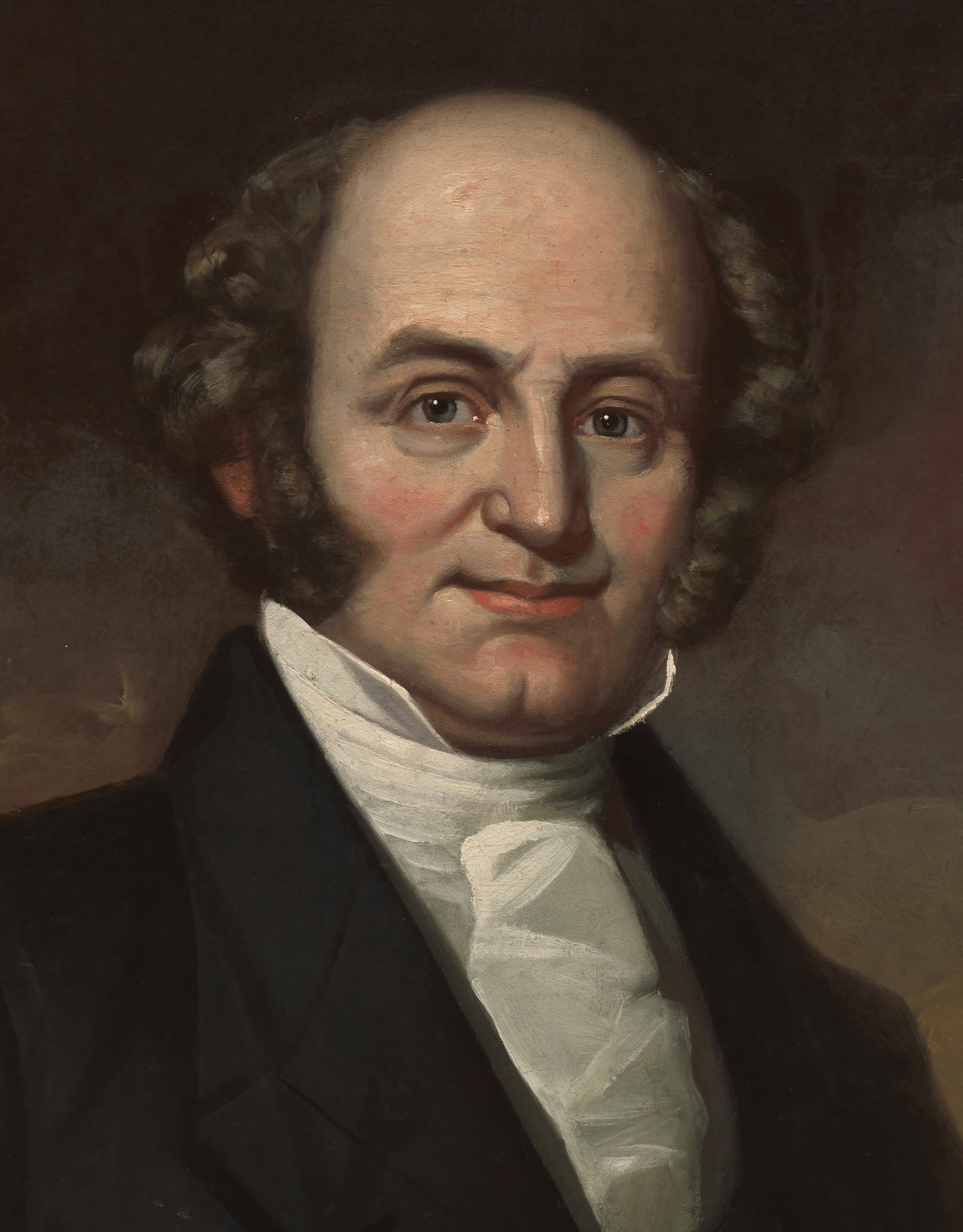
| Nominee | William Henry Harrison | Martin Van Buren |
| Party | Whig | Democratic |
| Home state | Ohio | New York |
| Running mate | John Tyler | none |
| Electoral vote | 5 | 0 |
| Popular vote | 11,296 | 7,616 |
| Percentage | 59.73% | 40.27% |
Parish results
Harrison
50–60%
60–70%
70–80%
80–90%
90–100%
Van Buren
50–60%
60–70%
80–90%
Tie/No Vote
50%
no data
President before election
Martin Van Buren
Democratic
Elected President
William Henry Harrison
Whig

A presidential election was held in Louisiana on November 3, 1840 as part of the 1840 United States presidential election. Voters chose five representatives, or electors to the Electoral College, who voted for President and Vice President.

Louisiana voted for the Whig candidate, William Henry Harrison, over Democratic candidate Martin Van Buren. Harrison won Louisiana by a margin of 19.46%.

With 59.73% of the popular vote, Louisiana would prove to be Harrison's fourth strongest state after Kentucky, Vermont and Rhode Island.

== Results ==
1840 United States presidential election in Louisiana
| Party | Candidate | Running mate | Popular vote | | Electoral vote | |
| Party | Candidate | Running mate | Count | % | Count | % |
|---|---|---|---|---|---|---|
| Whig | William Henry Harrison of Ohio | John Tyler of Virginia | 11,296 | 59.73% | 5 | 100.00% |
| Democratic | Martin Van Buren of New York | Richard Mentor Johnson of Kentucky | 7,616 | 40.27% | 0 | 0.00% |
| Total | | | 18,912 | 100.00% | 5 | 100.00% |

== See also ==
- United States presidential elections in Louisiana
