= 1832 United States presidential election in Louisiana =

- November 2 – December 5, 1832
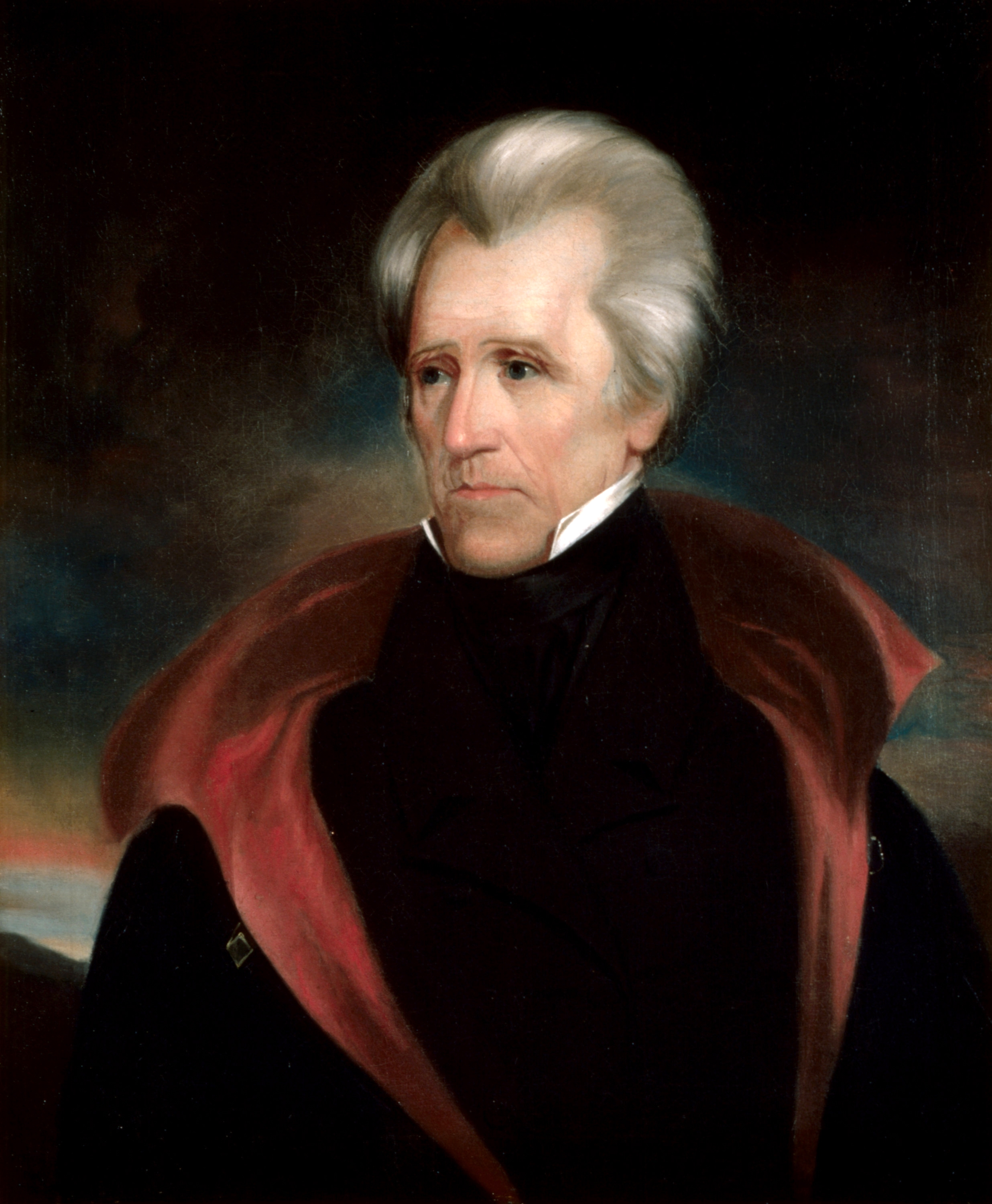

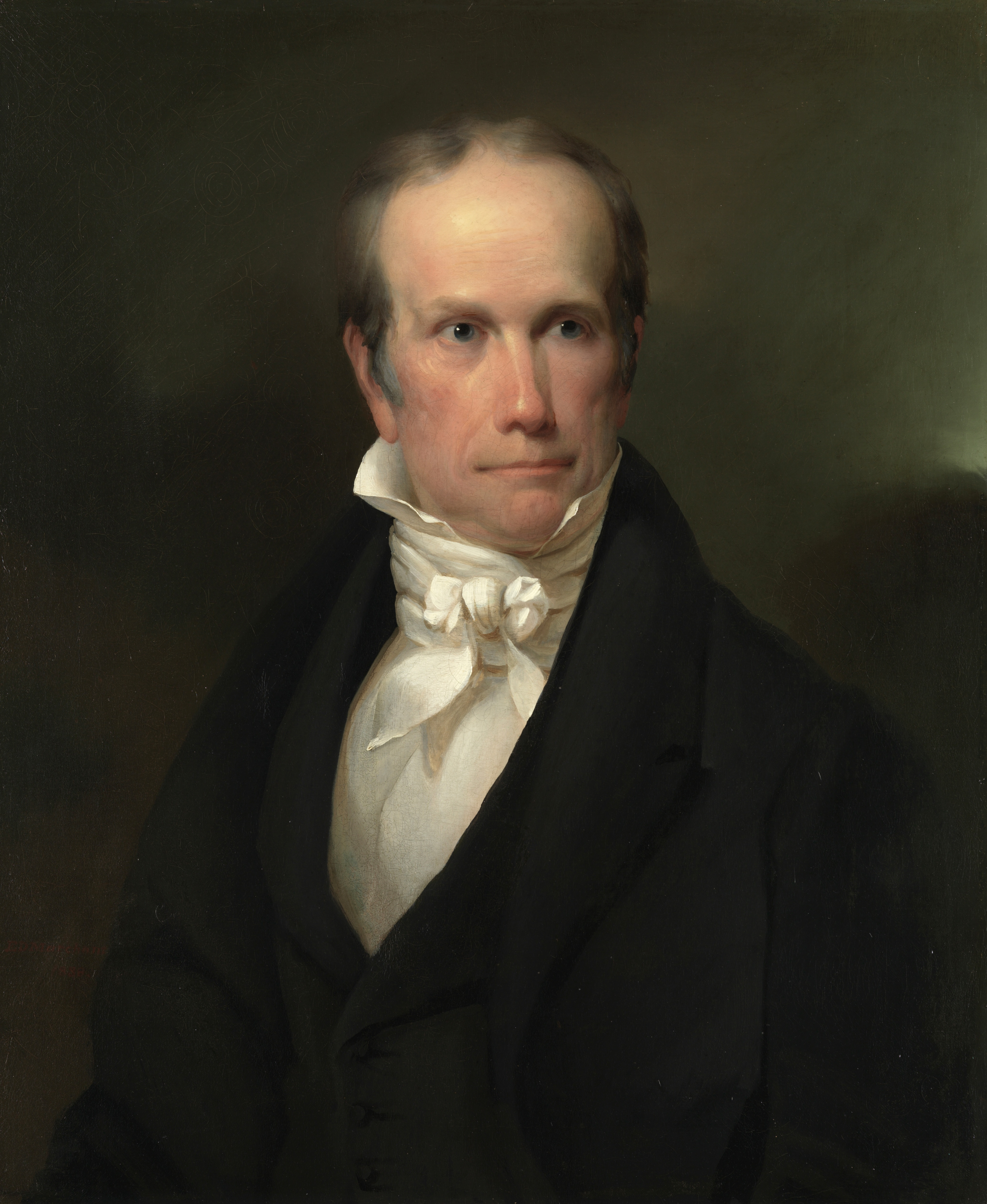
Nominee	Andrew Jackson	Henry Clay
Party	Democratic	National Republican
Home state	Tennessee	Kentucky
Running mate	Martin Van Buren	John Sergeant
Electoral vote	5	0
Popular vote	3,908	2,429
Percentage	61.67%	38.33%
County results
Jackson
50–60%
60–70%
70–80%
80–90%
90–100%
Clay
60–70%
70–80%
80–90%
No Data
President before election
Andrew Jackson
Democratic
Elected President
Andrew Jackson
Democratic

The 1832 United States presidential election in Louisiana took place between November 2 and December 5, 1832, as part of the 1832 United States presidential election. Voters chose five representatives, or electors to the Electoral College, who voted for President and Vice President.

Louisiana voted for the Democratic Party candidate, Andrew Jackson, over the National Republican candidate, Henry Clay. Jackson won Louisiana by a margin of 23.34%.

== Results ==
1832 United States presidential election in Louisiana
Party	Candidate	Votes	Percentage	Electoral votes
Democratic	Andrew Jackson (incumbent)	3,908	61.67%	5
National Republican	Henry Clay	2,429	38.33%	0
Totals		6,337	100.0%	5

== See also ==
- United States presidential elections in Louisiana
