= 1812 United States presidential election in Louisiana =

- October 30 – December 2, 1812
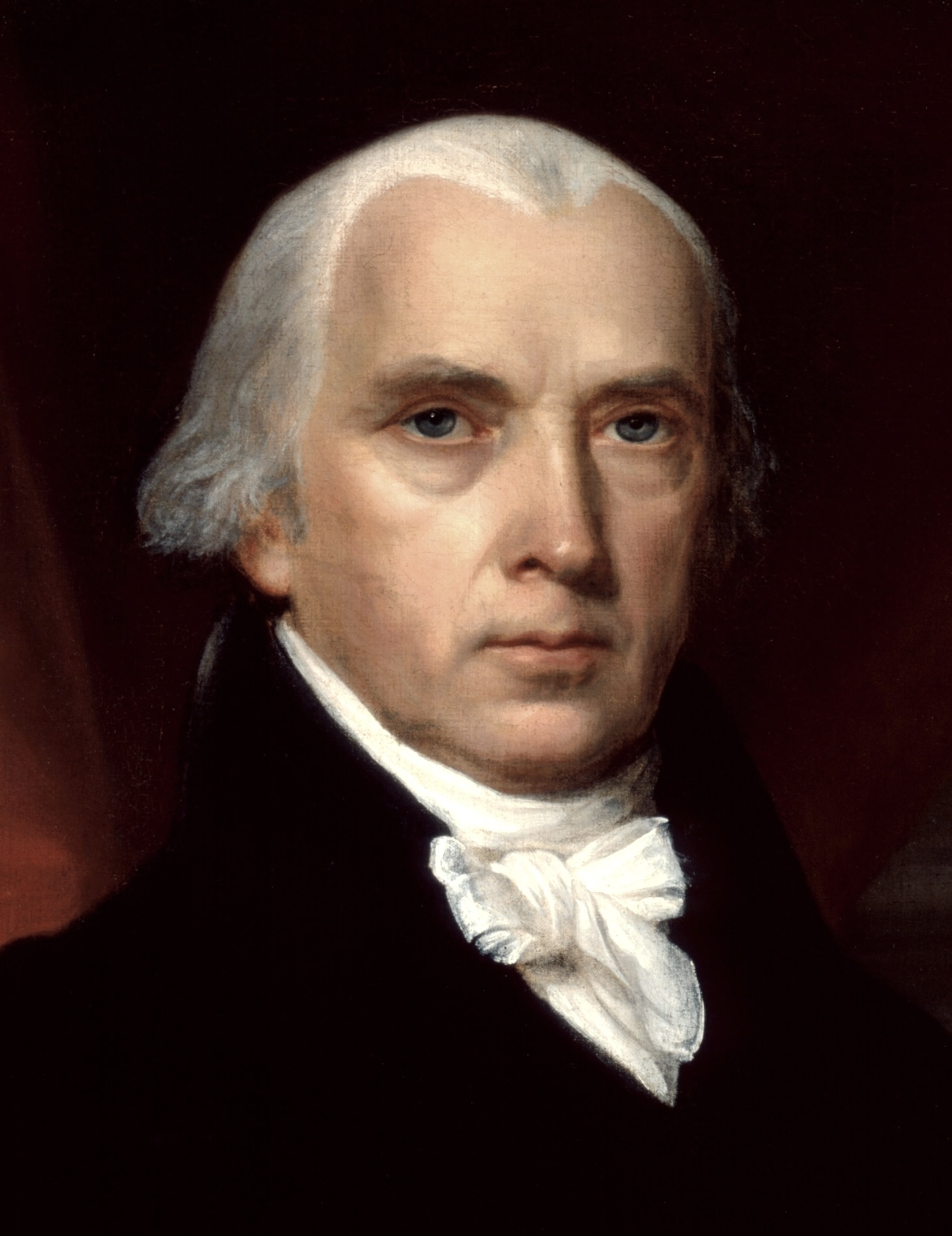
Nominee	James Madison
Party	Democratic-Republican
Home state	Virginia
Running mate	Elbridge Gerry
Electoral vote	3
President before election
James Madison
Democratic-Republican
Elected President
James Madison
Democratic-Republican

The 1812 United States presidential election in Louisiana took place between October 30 and December 2, 1812, as part of the 1812 United States presidential election. The state legislature chose three representatives, or electors to the Electoral College, who voted for President and Vice President.

Louisiana, which became the 18th state on April 30, 1812, cast its three electoral votes to Democratic Republican candidate and incumbent President James Madison in the state's first presidential election.

== See also ==
- United States presidential elections in Louisiana
