= United States presidential elections in Louisiana =

Presidential elections in Louisiana
- Number of elections: 53
- Voted Democratic: 32
- Voted Republican: 14
- Voted Whig: 2
- Voted Democratic-Republican: 3
- Voted other: 2 (Note: George Wallace, 1968; Strom Thurmond, 1948.)
- Voted for winning candidate: 33
- Voted for losing candidate: 20

Following is a table of United States presidential elections in Louisiana, ordered by year. Since its admission to statehood in 1812, Louisiana has participated in every U.S. presidential election except the election of 1864, during the American Civil War. At that time, Louisiana was controlled by the Union and held elections, but electors were not ultimately counted.

Winners of the state are in bold. The shading refers to the state winner, and not the national winner.

== Elections from 1864 to present ==
View source data.

Year	Winner (nationally)	Votes	Percent	Runner-up (nationally)	Votes	Percent	Other national candidates (Note: For purposes of these lists, other national candidates are defined as those who won at least one electoral vote, or won at least ten percent of the vote in multiple states.)	Votes	Percent	Electoral votes	Notes
2024	**Donald Trump**	1,208,505	60.22	Kamala Harris	766,870	38.21	—			8	
2020	Joe Biden	856,034	39.85	**Donald Trump**	1,255,776	58.46	—			8	
2016	**Donald Trump** (Note: Won the electoral college while losing the popular vote)	1,178,638	58.09	Hillary Clinton	780,154	38.45	—			8	
2012	Barack Obama	809,141	40.58	**Mitt Romney**	1,152,262	57.78	—			8	
2008	Barack Obama	782,989	39.93	**John McCain**	1,148,275	58.56	—			9	
2004	**George W. Bush**	1,102,169	56.72	John Kerry	820,299	42.22	—			9	
2000	**George W. Bush**	927,871	52.55	Al Gore	792,344	44.88	—			9	
1996	**Bill Clinton**	927,837	52.01	Bob Dole	712,586	39.94	Ross Perot	123,293	6.91	9	
1992	**Bill Clinton**	815,971	45.58	George H. W. Bush	733,386	40.97	Ross Perot	211,478	11.81	9	
1988	**George H. W. Bush**	883,702	54.27	Michael Dukakis	734,281	44.06	—			10	
1984	**Ronald Reagan**	1,037,299	60.77	Walter Mondale	651,586	38.18	—			10	
1980	**Ronald Reagan**	792,853	51.20	Jimmy Carter	708,453	45.75	-			10	
1976	**Jimmy Carter**	661,365	51.73	Gerald Ford	587,446	45.95	—			10	
1972	**Richard Nixon**	686,852	65.32	George McGovern	298,142	28.35	—			10	
1968	Richard Nixon	257,535	23.47	Hubert Humphrey	309,615	28.21	**George Wallace**	530,300	48.32	10	
1964	Lyndon B. Johnson	387,068	43.19	**Barry Goldwater**	509,225	56.81	—			10	
1960	**John F. Kennedy**	407,339	50.42	Richard Nixon	230,980	28.59	Unpledged electors	169,572	20.99	10	
1956	**Dwight D. Eisenhower**	329,047	53.28	Adlai Stevenson II	243,977	39.51	T. Coleman Andrews/ Unpledged Electors (Note: Was allied with a slate of unpledged electors in Louisiana, Mississippi and South Carolina)	44,520	7.21	10	
1952	Dwight D. Eisenhower	306,925	47.08	**Adlai Stevenson II**	345,027	52.92	—			10	
1948	Harry S. Truman	136,344	32.75	Thomas E. Dewey	72,657	17.45	**Strom Thurmond**	204,290	49.07	10	
1944	**Franklin D. Roosevelt**	281,564	80.59	Thomas E. Dewey	67,750	19.39	—			10	
1940	**Franklin D. Roosevelt**	319,751	85.88	Wendell Willkie	52,446	14.09	—			10	
1936	**Franklin D. Roosevelt**	292,894	88.82	Alf Landon	36,791	11.16	—			10	
1932	**Franklin D. Roosevelt**	249,418	92.79	Herbert Hoover	18,853	7.01	—			10	
1928	Herbert Hoover	51,160	23.70	**Al Smith**	164,655	76.29	-			10	
1924	Calvin Coolidge	24,670	20.23	**John W. Davis**	93,218	76.44	Robert M. La Follette	—	—	10	
1920	Warren G. Harding	38,538	30.49	**James M. Cox**	87,519	69.24	Parley P. Christensen	—	—	10	
1916	**Woodrow Wilson**	79,875	85.90	Charles E. Hughes	6,466	6.95	—			10	
1912	**Woodrow Wilson**	60,871	76.81	Theodore Roosevelt	9,283	11.71	William H. Taft	3,833	4.84	10	
1908	William H. Taft	8,958	11.93	**William Jennings Bryan**	63,568	84.63	—			9	
1904	Theodore Roosevelt	5,205	9.66	**Alton B. Parker**	47,708	88.50	—			9	
1900	William McKinley	14,234	20.96	**William Jennings Bryan**	53,668	79.03	—			8	
1896	William McKinley	22,037	21.81	**William Jennings Bryan**	77,175	76.38	—			8	
1892	**Grover Cleveland**	87,926	76.53	Benjamin Harrison	26,963	23.47	James B. Weaver	—	—	8	
1888	Benjamin Harrison	30,660	26.46	**Grover Cleveland**	85,032	73.37	—			8	
1884	**Grover Cleveland**	62,594	57.22	James G. Blaine	46,347	42.37	—			8	
1880	James A. Garfield	38,978	37.31	**Winfield S. Hancock**	65,047	62.27	James B. Weaver	437	0.42	8	
1876	**Rutherford B. Hayes**	75,315	51.65	Samuel J. Tilden	70,508	48.35	—			8	
1872	**Ulysses S. Grant**	71,663	55.69	Horace Greeley	57,029	44.31	—			8	Louisiana's electoral votes were rejected due to various irregularities, including allegations of electoral fraud.
1868	Ulysses S. Grant	33,263	29.3	**Horatio Seymour**	80,225	70.7	—			7	
1864	**Abraham Lincoln**			George B. McClellan			—			n/a	Under Union control by 1864 and held elections, but electors (who voted for Lincoln) were not ultimately counted.

== Election of 1860 ==
The election of 1860 was a complex realigning election in which the breakdown of the previous two-party alignment culminated in four parties each competing for influence in different parts of the country. The result of the election, with the victory of an ardent opponent of slavery, spurred the secession of eleven states and brought about the American Civil War.

Year	Winner (nationally)	Votes	Percent	Runner-up (nationally)	Votes	Percent	Runner-up (nationally)	Votes	Percent	Runner-up (nationally)	Votes	Percent	Electoral votes
1860	Abraham Lincoln	no ballots		Stephen A. Douglas	7,625	15.1	**John C. Breckinridge**	22,681	44.9	John Bell	20,204	40.0	6

== Elections from 1828 to 1856 ==
Year	Winner (nationally)	Votes	Percent	Runner-up (nationally)	Votes	Percent	Other national candidates	Votes	Percent	Electoral votes	Notes
1856	James Buchanan	22,164	51.7	John C. Frémont	no ballots		Millard Fillmore	20,709	48.3	6	
1852	Franklin Pierce	18,647	51.94	Winfield Scott	17,255	48.06	John P. Hale	no ballots		6	
1848	Zachary Taylor	18,487	54.59	Lewis Cass	15,379	45.41	Martin Van Buren	no ballots		6	
1844	James K. Polk	13,782	51.3	Henry Clay	13,083	48.7	—			6	
1840	William Henry Harrison	11,296	59.73	Martin Van Buren	7,616	40.27	—			5	
1836	Martin Van Buren	3,842	51.74	Hugh Lawson White	3,583	48.26	various< (Note: Three other candidates ran and received electoral votes nationally as part of the unsuccessful Whig strategy to defeat Martin Van Buren by running four candidates with local appeal in different regions of the country. The others were William Henry Harrison, Daniel Webster, and Willie Person Mangum. None of these candidates appeared on the ballot in Louisiana.)			5	
1832	Andrew Jackson	3,908	61.67	Henry Clay	2,429	38.33	William Wirt	no ballots		5	
1828	Andrew Jackson	4,605	53.01	John Quincy Adams	4,082	46.99	—			5	

== Elections from 1812 to 1824 ==
In elections from 1812 to 1824, Louisiana did not conduct a popular vote. Each Elector was appointed by state legislature.

The election of 1824 was a complex realigning election following the collapse of the prevailing Democratic-Republican Party, resulting in four different candidates each claiming to carry the banner of the party, and competing for influence in different parts of the country. The election was the only one in history to be decided by the House of Representatives under the provisions of the Twelfth Amendment to the United States Constitution after no candidate secured a majority of the electoral vote. It was also the only presidential election in which the candidate who received a plurality of electoral votes (Andrew Jackson) did not become president, a source of great bitterness for Jackson and his supporters, who proclaimed the election of Adams a corrupt bargain.

Year	Winner (nationally)	Loser(s) (nationally)	Electoral votes	Notes
1824	John Quincy Adams	**Andrew Jackson**; Henry Clay; William H. Crawford	5	Electoral vote was split, with Jackson receiving three votes and Adams receiving two votes.
1820	**James Monroe**	—	3	Monroe effectively ran unopposed.
1816	**James Monroe**	Rufus King	3	
1812	**James Madison**	DeWitt Clinton	3	

== See also ==
- Elections in Louisiana
