= 1856 United States presidential election in Louisiana =

- November 4, 1856
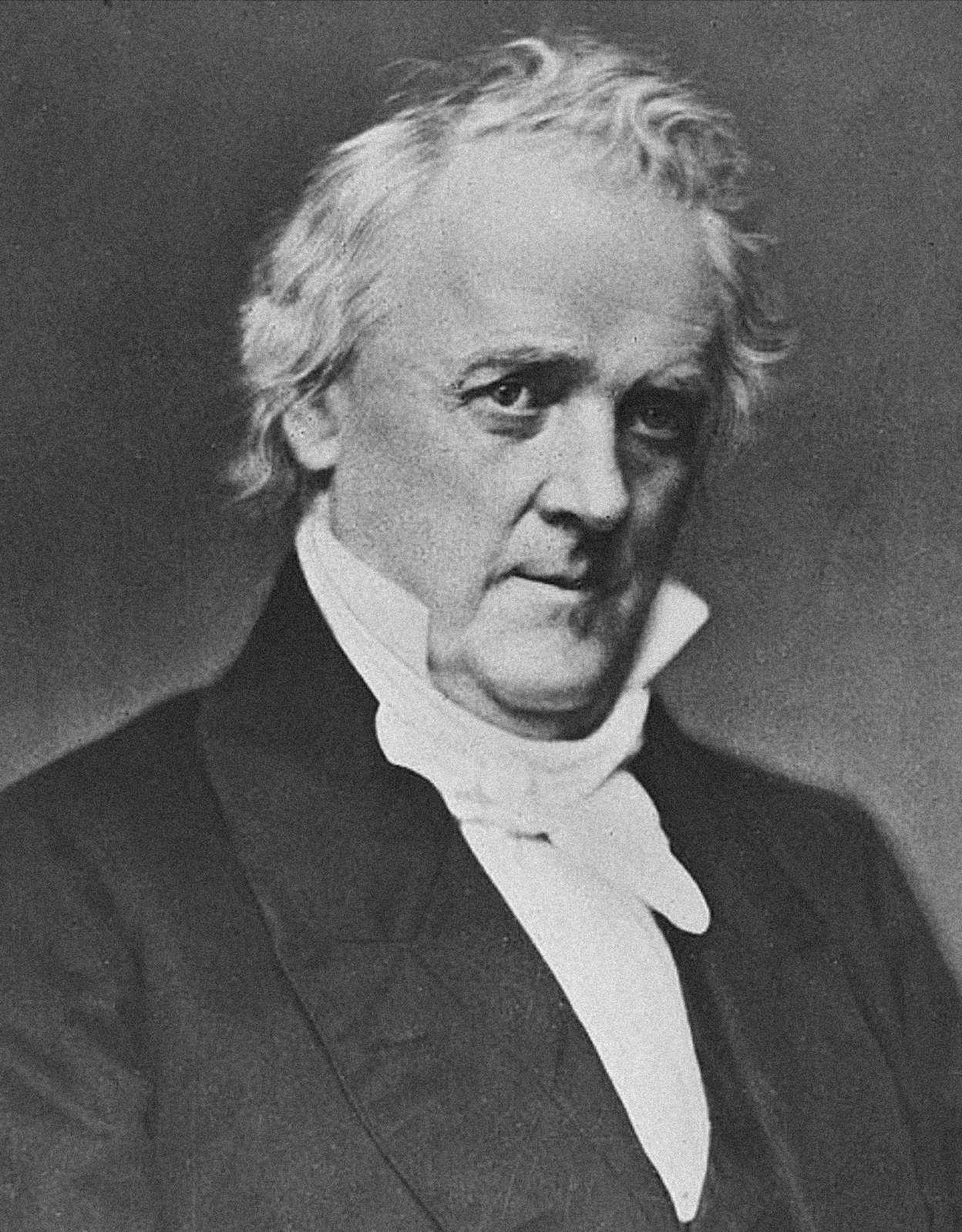

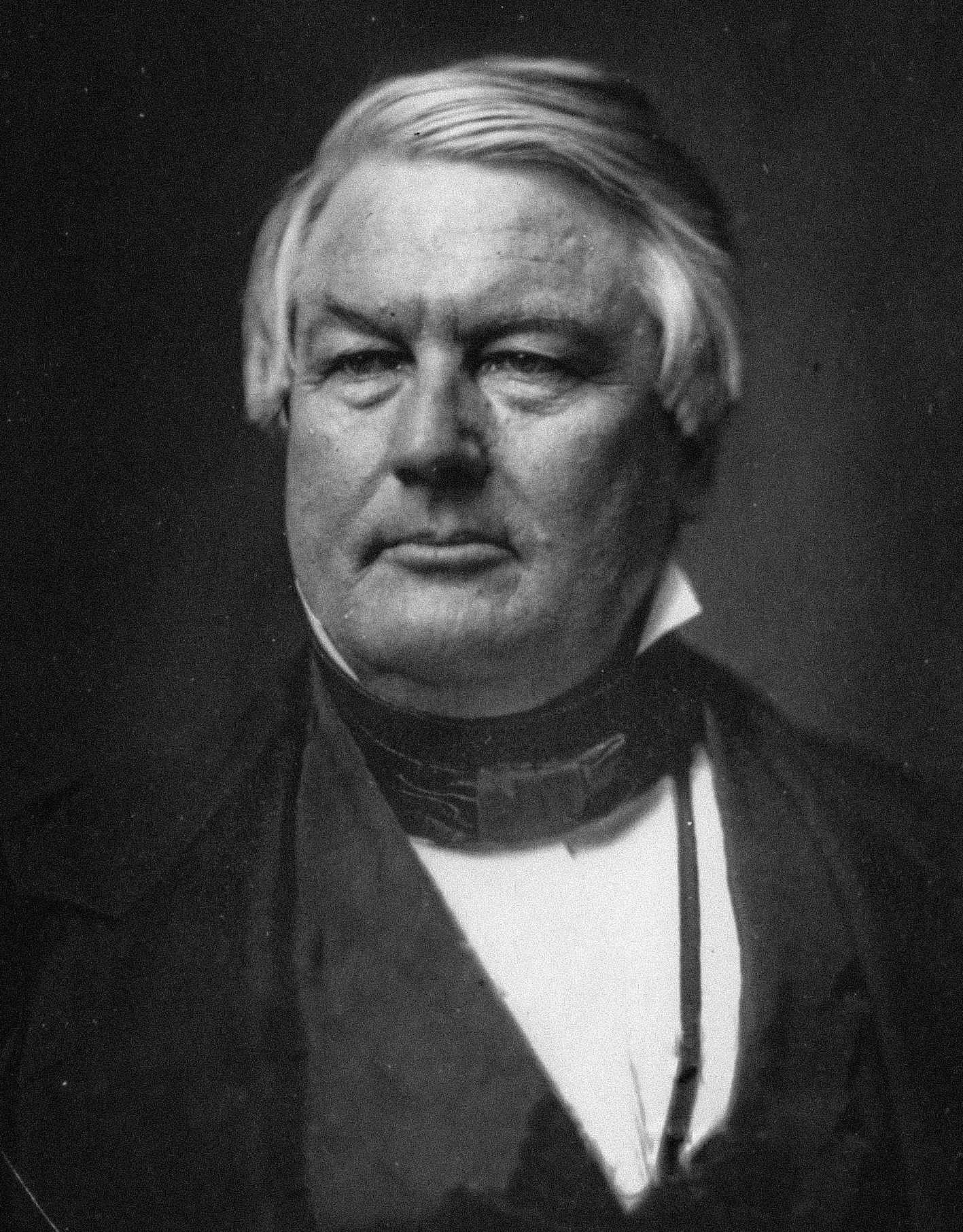
Nominee	James Buchanan	Millard Fillmore
Party	Democratic	Know Nothing
Home state	Pennsylvania	New York
Running mate	John C. Breckinridge	Andrew Jackson Donelson
Electoral vote	6	0
Popular vote	22,164	20,709
Percentage	51.70%	48.30%
Parish results
Buchanan
50–60%
60–70%
70–80%
80–90%
90–100%
Fillmore
50–60%
60–70%
70–80%
80–90%
President before election
Franklin Pierce
Democratic
Elected President
James Buchanan
Democratic

The 1856 United States presidential election in Louisiana took place on November 4, 1856, as part of the 1856 United States presidential election. Voters chose six representatives, or electors to the Electoral College, who voted for president and vice president.

Louisiana voted for the Democratic candidate, James Buchanan, over American Party candidate Millard Fillmore. Buchanan won Louisiana by a narrow margin of 3.40%.

Republican Party candidate John C. Frémont was not on the ballot in the state.

== Results ==
1856 United States presidential election in Louisiana
Party	Candidate	Votes	%
Democratic	James Buchanan	22,164	51.70%
Know Nothing	Millard Fillmore	20,709	48.30%
Total votes		42,873	100%

=== Results by County ===
1856 United States Presidential Election in Louisiana (By Parish)
Parish	James Buchanan Democratic		Millard Fillmore Know Nothing		Total Votes Cast
Parish	#	%	#	%	Total Votes Cast
Ascension	479	63.44%	276	36.56%	755
Assumption	837	81.10%	195	18.90%	1,032
Avoyelles	584	64.39%	323	35.61%	907
Bienville	706	70.46%	296	29.54%	1,002
Bossier	475	70.16%	202	29.84%	677
Caddo	458	48.16%	493	51.84%	951
Calcasieu	296	92.21%	25	2.79%	321
Caldwell	308	75.12%	102	24.88%	410
Carroll	441	60.49%	288	39.51%	729
Catahoula	448	52.15%	411	47.85%	859
Claiborne	852	55.69%	678	44.31%	1,530
Concordia	135	46.55%	155	53.45%	290
De Soto	510	63.28%	296	36.72%	806
East Baton Rouge	593	52.34%	540	47.66%	1,133
East Feliciana	464	57.28%	346	42.72%	810
Franklin	264	59.06%	183	40.94%	447
Iberville	517	66.11%	265	33.89%	782
Jackson	538	58.16%	387	41.84%	925
Jefferson	122	11.52%	937	88.48%	1,059
Lafayette	453	77.97%	128	22.03%	581
Lafourche	753	71.51%	300	28.49%	1,053
Livingston	391	62.86%	231	37.14%	622
Madison	210	46.77%	239	53.23%	449
Morehouse	332	48.61%	351	51.39%	683
Natchitoches	588	58.33%	420	41.67%	1,008
Orleans	2,626	30.26%	6,052	69.74%	8,678
Ouachita	390	60.00%	260	40.00%	650
Plaquemines	248	54.75%	205	45.25%	453
Pointe Coupee	521	66.20%	266	33.80%	787
Rapides	763	56.64%	584	43.36%	1,347
Sabine	349	64.87%	189	35.13%	538
St. Bernard	122	50.20%	123	49.80%	245
St. Charles	104	60.82%	67	39.18%	171
St. Helena	272	46.82%	309	53.18%	581
St. James	172	31.16%	380	68.84%	552
St. John the Baptist	217	52.54%	196	47.46%	413
St. Landry	1,103	57.75%	807	42.25%	1,910
St. Mary	374	45.44%	449	54.56%	823
St. Martin	423	43.88%	541	56.12%	964
St. Tammany	227	42.75%	304	57.25%	531
Tensas	205	56.63%	157	43.37%	362
Terrebonne	382	49.04%	397	50.96%	779
Union	623	53.34%	545	46.66%	1,168
Vermilion	234	66.86%	116	33.14%	350
Washington	304	68.16%	142	31.84%	446
West Baton Rouge	147	42.36%	200	57.64%	347
West Feliciana	290	59.67%	196	40.33%	486
Winn	314	66.67%	157	33.33%	471
Total	22,164	51.70%	20,709	48.30%	42,873

== See also ==
- United States presidential elections in Louisiana
