= 1888 United States presidential election in Louisiana =

- November 6, 1888
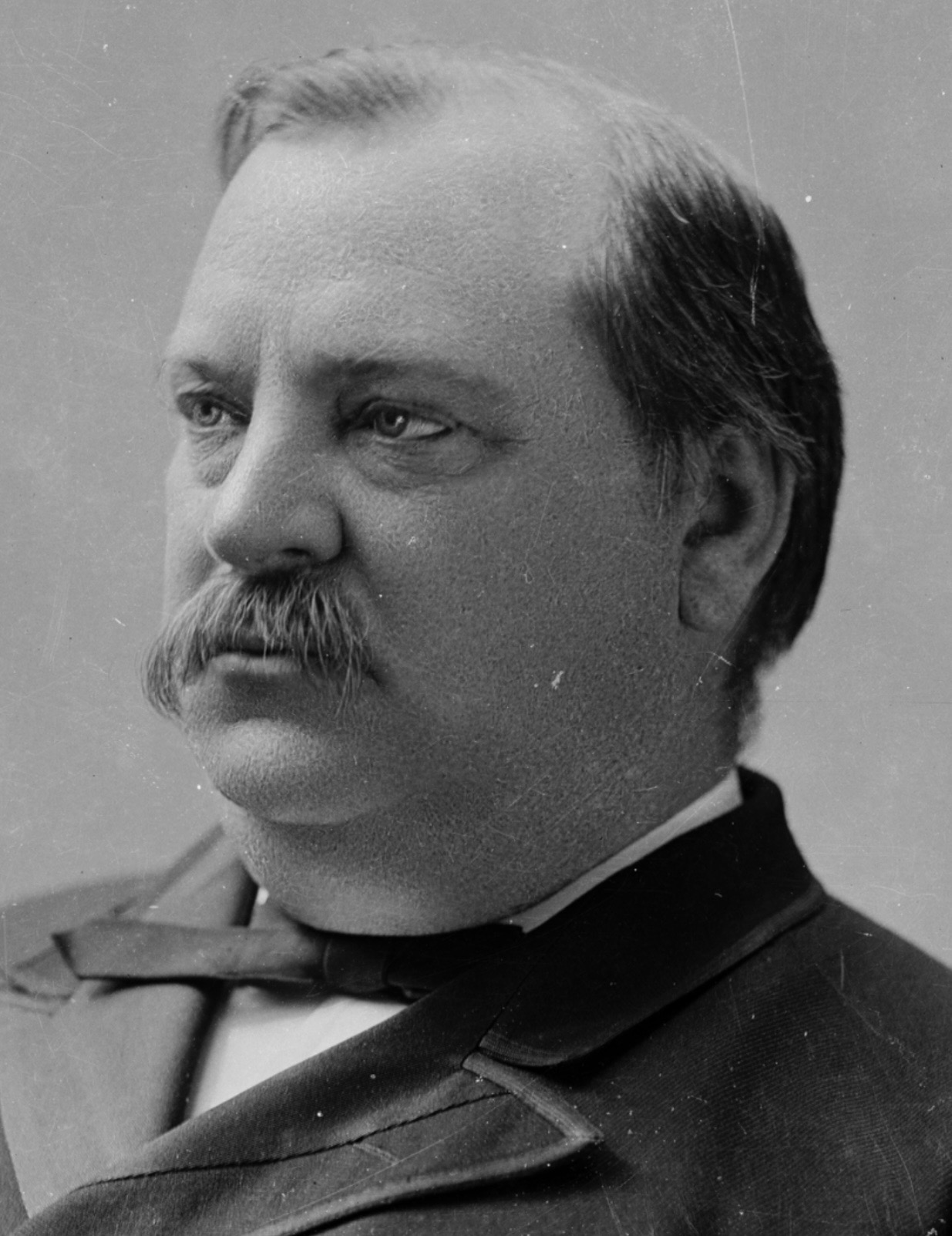

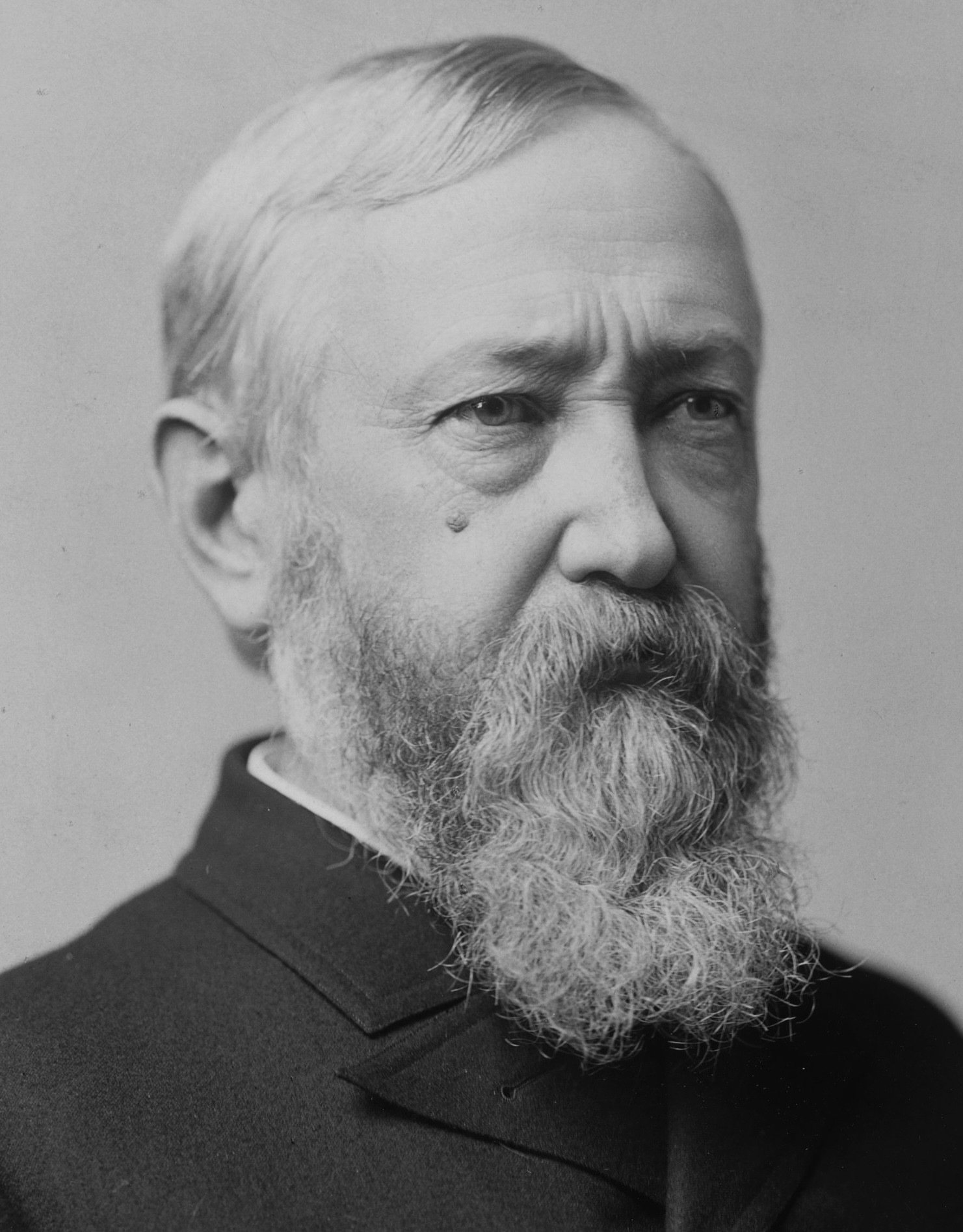
Nominee	Grover Cleveland	Benjamin Harrison
Party	Democratic	Republican
Home state	New York	Indiana
Running mate	Allen G. Thurman	Levi P. Morton
Electoral vote	8	0
Popular vote	85,032	30,660
Percentage	73.37%	26.46%
Parish results
Cleveland
50–60%
60–70%
70–80%
80–90%
90–100%
Harrison
50–60%
60–70%
70–80%
90–100%
President before election
Grover Cleveland
Democratic
Elected President
Benjamin Harrison
Republican

The 1888 United States presidential election in Louisiana took place on November 6, 1888, as part of the 1888 United States presidential election. Voters chose eight representatives, or electors to the Electoral College, who voted for president and vice president.

Louisiana voted for the Democratic nominee, incumbent President Grover Cleveland, over the Republican nominee, Benjamin Harrison. Cleveland won the state by a large margin of 46.91%.

== Results ==
1888 United States presidential election in Louisiana
Party	Candidate	Running mate	Popular vote		Electoral vote	
Party	Candidate	Running mate	Count	%	Count	%
Democratic	Grover Cleveland of New York (incumbent)	Allen Granberry Thurman of Ohio	85,032	73.37%	8	100.00%
Republican	Benjamin Harrison of Indiana	Levi Parsons Morton of New York	30,660	26.46%	0	0.00%
N/A	Others	Others	199	0.17%	0	0.00%
Total			115,891	100.00%	8	100.00%

== See also ==
- United States presidential elections in Louisiana
