= 1852 United States presidential election in Louisiana =

- November 2, 1852

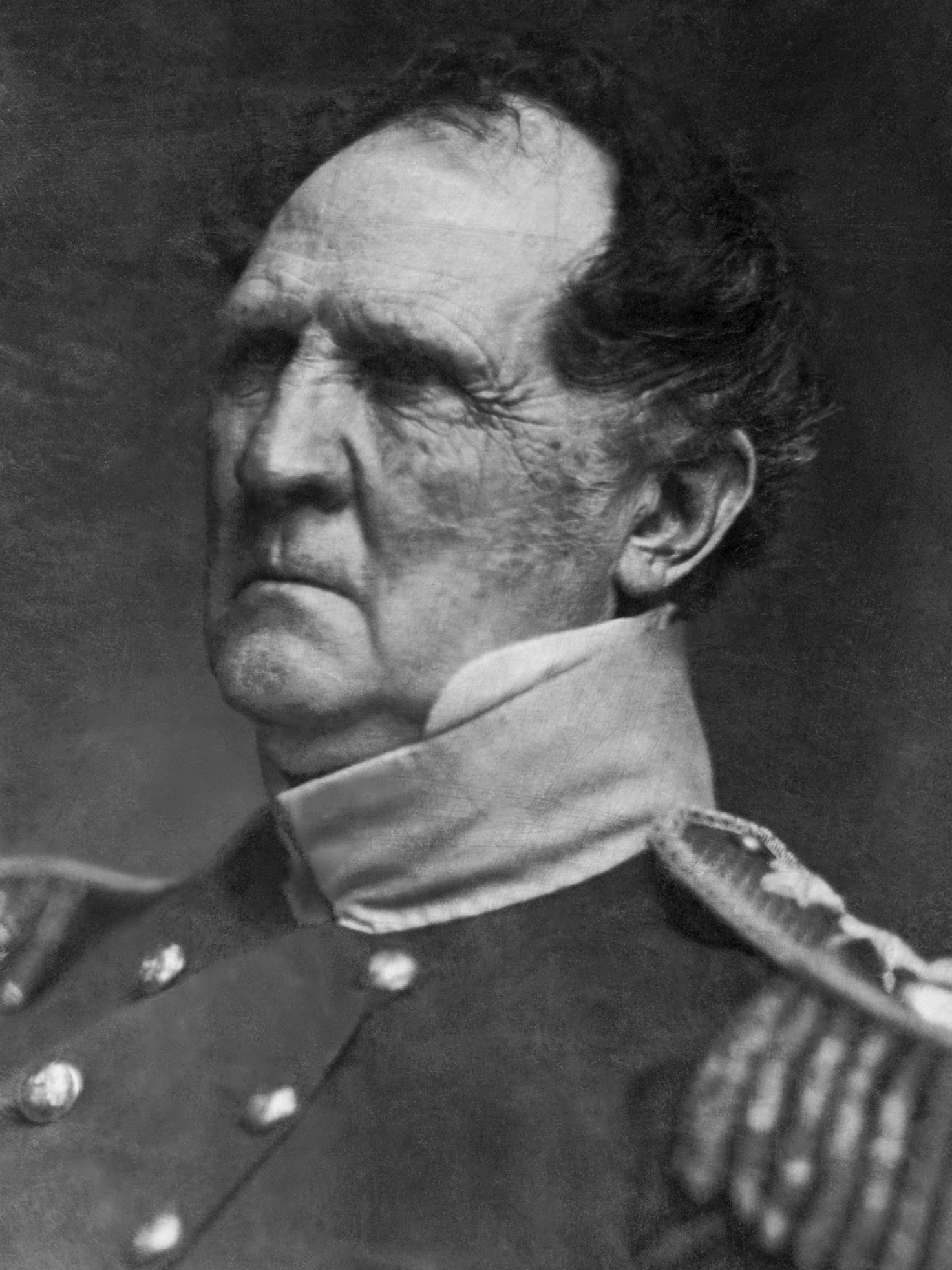
Nominee	Franklin Pierce	Winfield Scott
Party	Democratic	Whig
Home state	New Hampshire	New Jersey
Running mate	William R. King	William Alexander Graham
Electoral vote	6	0
Popular vote	18,647	17,255
Percentage	51.94%	48.06%
Parish results
Pierce
50–60%
60–70%
70–80%
80–90%
Scott
50–60%
60–70%
70–80%
80–90%
President before election
Millard Fillmore
Whig
Elected President
Franklin Pierce
Democratic

The 1852 United States presidential election in Louisiana took place on November 2, 1852, as part of the 1852 United States presidential election. Voters chose six representatives, or electors to the Electoral College, who voted for President and Vice President.

Louisiana voted for the Democratic candidate, Franklin Pierce, over Whig candidate Winfield Scott. Pierce won Louisiana by a narrow margin of 3.88%.

== Results ==
1852 United States presidential election in Louisiana
Party	Candidate	Running mate	Popular vote		Electoral vote	
Party	Candidate	Running mate	Count	%	Count	%
Democratic	Franklin Pierce of New Hampshire	William R. King of Alabama	18,647	51.94%	6	100.00%
Whig	Winfield Scott of New Jersey	William Alexander Graham of North Carolina	17,255	48.06%	0	0.00%
Total			35,902	100.00%	6	100.00%

== See also ==
- United States presidential elections in Louisiana
