= 1824 United States presidential election in Louisiana =

- October 26 – December 2, 1824
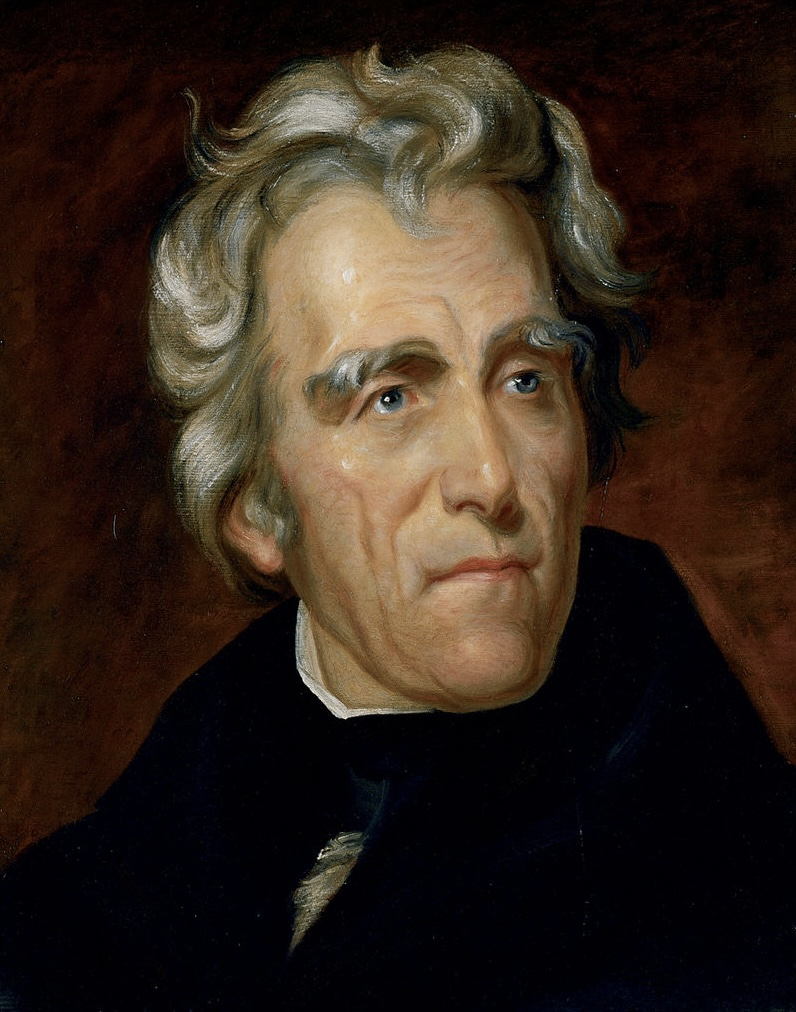

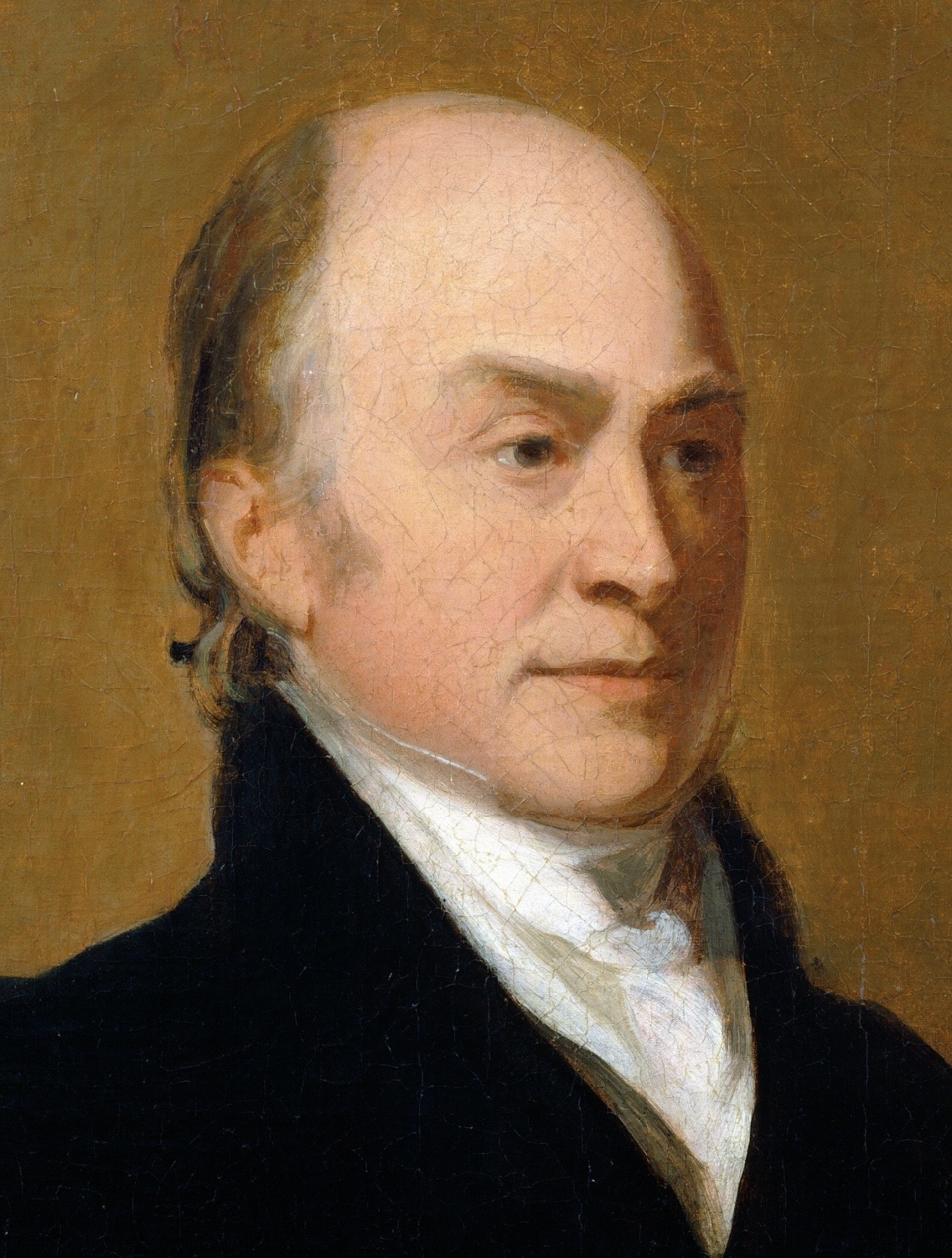
Nominee	Andrew Jackson	John Quincy Adams
Party	Democratic-Republican	Democratic-Republican
Home state	Tennessee	Massachusetts
Running mate	John C. Calhoun	Nathaniel Macon
Electoral vote	3	2
President before election
James Monroe
Democratic-Republican
Elected President
John Quincy Adams
Democratic-Republican

The 1824 United States presidential election in Louisiana took place between October 26 and December 2, 1824, as part of the 1824 United States presidential election. The state legislature chose five representatives, or electors to the Electoral College, who voted for president and vice president.

During this election, the Democratic-Republican Party was the only major national party, and four different candidates from this party sought the presidency. Louisiana cast three electoral votes for Andrew Jackson and two for John Quincy Adams.

== Results ==
1824 United States presidential election in Louisiana
Party	Candidate	Votes	Percentage	Electoral votes
Democratic-Republican	Andrew Jackson			3
Democratic-Republican	John Quincy Adams			2
Democratic-Republican	Henry Clay			0
Democratic-Republican	William H. Crawford			0
Totals				5

== See also ==
- United States presidential elections in Louisiana
