= 1892 United States presidential election in Arkansas =

- November 8, 1892

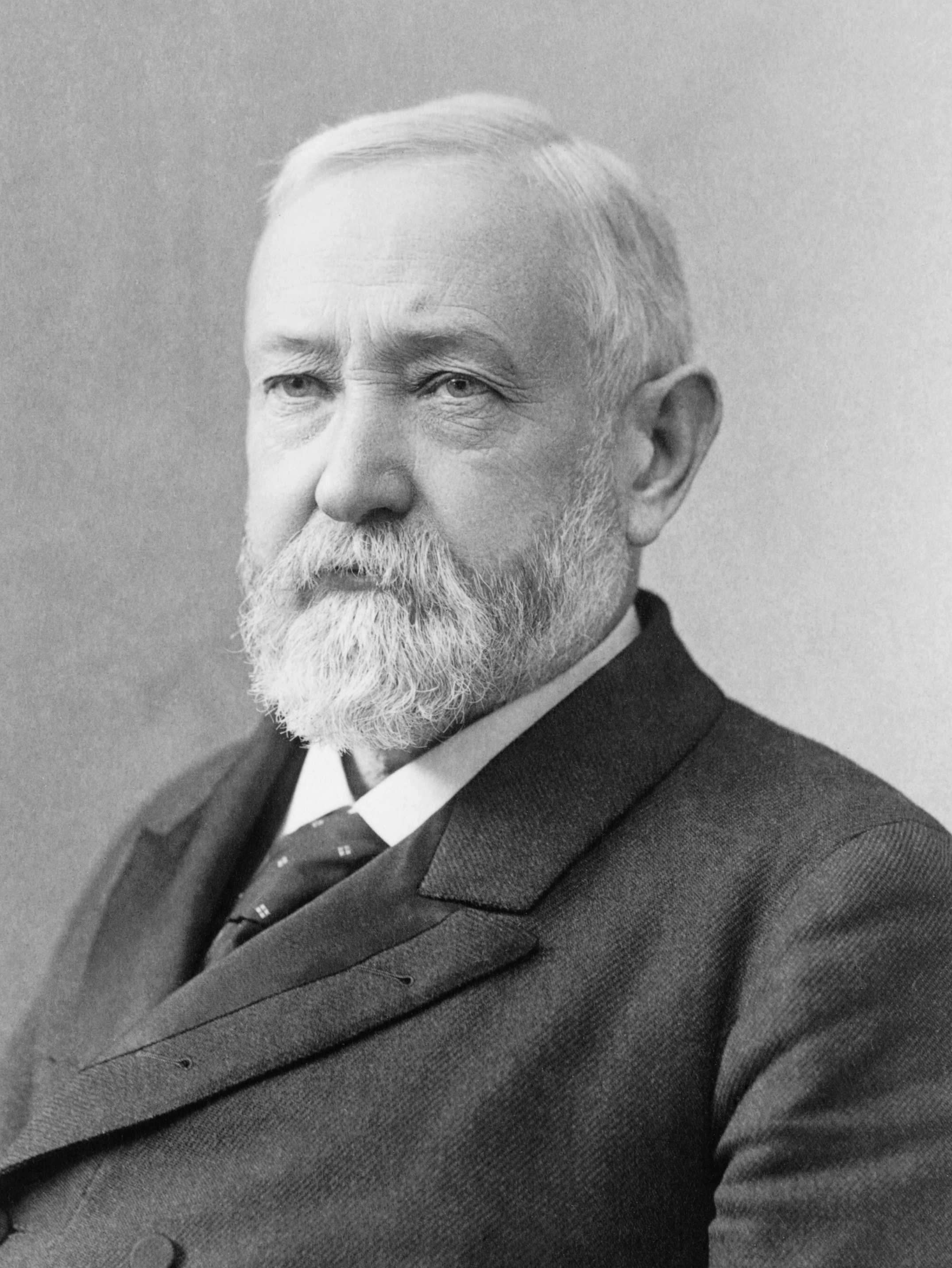

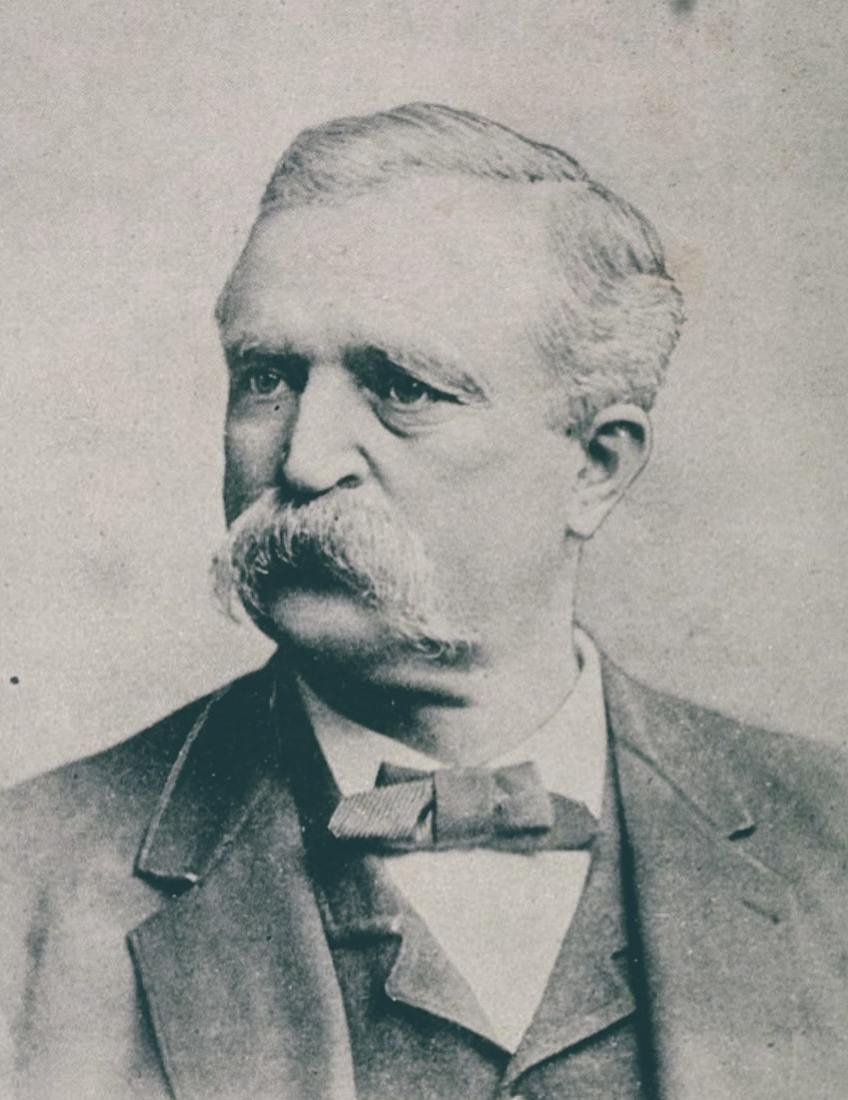
Nominee	Grover Cleveland	Benjamin Harrison	James B. Weaver
Party	Democratic	Republican	Populist
Home state	New York	Indiana	Iowa
Running mate	Adlai Stevenson I	Whitelaw Reid	James G. Field
Electoral vote	8	0	0
Popular vote	87,834	47,072	11,831
Percentage	59.30%	31.78%	7.99%
County results
Cleveland
30–40%
40–50%
50–60%
60–70%
70–80%
80–90%
Harrison
50–60%
60–70%
President before election
Benjamin Harrison
Republican
Elected President
Grover Cleveland
Democratic

The 1892 United States presidential election in Arkansas took place on November 8, 1892. All contemporary 44 states were part of the 1892 United States presidential election. Arkansas voters chose eight electors to the Electoral College, which selected the president and vice president.

Arkansas was won by the Democratic nominees, former President Grover Cleveland of New York and his running mate Adlai Stevenson I of Illinois. This election illustrated the political movement towards the one-party Jim Crow South – which would cover every county in Arkansas except Unionist Ozark Newton and Searcy. Wealthy white landowners were extremely angry that via the Union Labor Party – which the state Republicans had endorsed in the 1888 and 1890 gubernatorial elections – poor blacks and poor whites might be uniting against them. The Democratic Party thus introduced a poll tax that would weigh extremely heavily upon poor Union Labor supporters and also introduced the secret ballot which would make it more difficult for illiterate blacks and poor whites to cast a vote even if they could pay the poll tax.

Populist Weaver thought he had “magnificent” chances in the impoverished South, and campaigned heavily there. but as it turned out the halving of the electorate meant he could gain very little support. Weaver was not helped by his controversial decision to take a woman – Mary Lease – on his campaigns, as the South thought any political involvement degraded womanhood. Weaver did nonetheless win counties in Alabama, Georgia, Mississippi, North Carolina, and Texas.

== Results ==
1892 United States presidential election in Arkansas
Party	Candidate	Votes	Percentage	Electoral votes
Democratic	Grover Cleveland	87,834	59.30%	8
Republican	Benjamin Harrison (incumbent)	47,072	31.78%	0
People's	James B. Weaver	11,831	7.99%	0
Write-ins	Scattered	1,267	0.86%	0
Prohibition	John Bidwell	113	0.08%	0
Totals		148,117	100.00%	8
Voter turnout				—

=== Results by county ===
1892 United States presidential election in Arkansas by county
County	Grover Cleveland Democratic		Benjamin Harrison Republican		James B. Weaver People's		John Bidwell Prohibition		Various candidates Write-ins		Margin		Total votes cast
County	#	%	#	%	#	%	#	%	#	%	#	%	Total votes cast
Arkansas	987	57.48%	638	37.16%	84	4.89%	8	0.47%			349	20.33%	1,717
Ashley	1,099	67.92%	478	29.54%	41	2.53%	0	0.00%			621	38.38%	1,618
Baxter	802	71.86%	269	24.10%	44	3.94%	0	0.00%	1	0.09%	533	47.76%	1,116
Benton	2,587	62.52%	1,212	29.29%	328	7.93%	11	0.27%			1,375	33.23%	4,138
Boone	1,472	76.23%	457	23.67%	0	0.00%	2	0.10%			1,015	52.56%	1,931
Bradley	824	81.83%	183	18.17%	0	0.00%	0	0.00%			641	63.65%	1,007
Calhoun	654	75.26%	201	23.13%	14	1.61%	0	0.00%			453	52.13%	869
Carroll	1,252	51.71%	984	40.64%	178	7.35%	7	0.29%			268	11.07%	2,421
Chicot	361	33.40%	685	63.37%	16	1.48%	0	0.00%	19	1.76%	-324	-29.97%	1,081
Clark	1,404	38.21%	775	21.09%	745	20.28%	15	0.41%	735	20.01%	629	17.12%	3,674
Clay	1,225	67.72%	480	26.53%	104	5.75%	0	0.00%			745	41.18%	1,809
Cleburne	606	55.04%	132	11.99%	345	31.34%	0	0.00%	18	1.63%	261 (Note: In this county where Harrison ran third behind Cleveland and Weaver, margin given is Cleveland vote minus Weaver vote and percentage margin Cleveland percentage minus Weaver percentage.)	23.71%	1,101
Cleveland	1,035	70.31%	353	23.98%	84	5.71%	0	0.00%			682	46.33%	1,472
Columbia	1,714	66.36%	475	18.39%	197	7.63%	0	0.00%	197	7.63%	1,239	47.97%	2,583
Conway	1,284	55.56%	731	31.63%	296	12.81%	0	0.00%			553	23.93%	2,311
Craighead	1,248	69.96%	372	20.85%	164	9.19%	0	0.00%			876	49.10%	1,784
Crawford	1,545	51.64%	1,099	36.73%	344	11.50%	4	0.13%			446	14.91%	2,992
Crittenden	353	32.53%	706	65.07%	26	2.40%	0	0.00%			-353	-32.53%	1,085
Cross	677	57.23%	432	36.52%	74	6.26%	0	0.00%			245	20.71%	1,183
Dallas	867	60.04%	498	34.49%	71	4.92%	8	0.55%			369	25.55%	1,444
Desha	407	54.93%	298	40.22%	17	2.29%	0	0.00%	19	2.56%	109	14.71%	741
Drew	1,188	57.67%	707	34.32%	165	8.01%	0	0.00%			481	23.35%	2,060
Faulkner	1,499	49.64%	1,200	39.74%	321	10.63%	0	0.00%			299	9.90%	3,020
Franklin	1,799	71.73%	550	21.93%	154	6.14%	5	0.20%			1,249	49.80%	2,508
Fulton	873	64.76%	415	30.79%	60	4.45%	0	0.00%			458	33.98%	1,348
Garland	1,456	57.46%	940	37.10%	132	5.21%	6	0.24%			516	20.36%	2,534
Grant	695	76.12%	156	17.09%	62	6.79%	0	0.00%			539	59.04%	913
Greene	1,241	68.60%	321	17.74%	247	13.65%	0	0.00%			920	50.86%	1,809
Hempstead	1,757	58.10%	1,051	34.76%	176	5.82%	0	0.00%	40	1.32%	706	23.35%	3,024
Hot Spring	1,025	71.13%	277	19.22%	137	9.51%	2	0.14%			748	51.91%	1,441
Howard	1,072	62.91%	354	20.77%	278	16.31%	0	0.00%			718	42.14%	1,704
Independence	1,792	59.63%	868	28.89%	334	11.11%	11	0.37%			924	30.75%	3,005
Izard	1,204	73.82%	425	26.06%	0	0.00%	2	0.12%			779	47.76%	1,631
Jackson	1,600	66.89%	712	29.77%	80	3.34%	0	0.00%			888	37.12%	2,392
Jefferson	1,784	57.55%	1,092	35.23%	177	5.71%	0	0.00%	47	1.52%	692	22.32%	3,100
Johnson	1,479	65.85%	514	22.89%	250	11.13%	0	0.00%	3	0.13%	965	42.97%	2,246
Lafayette	438	54.41%	367	45.59%	0	0.00%	0	0.00%			71	8.82%	805
Lawrence	1,220	68.23%	418	23.38%	150	8.39%	0	0.00%			802	44.85%	1,788
Lee	1,082	52.30%	926	44.76%	61	2.95%	0	0.00%			156	7.54%	2,069
Lincoln	730	38.67%	1,033	54.71%	125	6.62%	0	0.00%			-303	-16.05%	1,888
Little River	627	50.28%	411	32.96%	209	16.76%	0	0.00%			216	17.32%	1,247
Logan	1,575	57.73%	1,039	38.09%	113	4.14%	0	0.00%	1	0.04%	536	19.65%	2,728
Lonoke	1,617	61.62%	699	26.64%	308	11.74%	0	0.00%			918	34.98%	2,624
Madison	1,374	52.22%	1,154	43.86%	99	3.76%	4	0.15%			220	8.36%	2,631
Marion	965	75.04%	263	20.45%	58	4.51%	0	0.00%			702	54.59%	1,286
Miller	1,064	57.95%	647	35.24%	121	6.59%	3	0.16%	1	0.05%	417	22.71%	1,836
Mississippi	777	59.68%	525	40.32%	0	0.00%	0	0.00%			252	19.35%	1,302
Monroe	796	56.37%	616	43.63%	0	0.00%	0	0.00%			180	12.75%	1,412
Montgomery	612	67.70%	155	17.15%	137	15.15%	0	0.00%			457	50.55%	904
Nevada	1,132	43.77%	645	24.94%	809	31.28%	0	0.00%			323	12.49%	2,586
Newton	458	46.59%	525	53.41%	0	0.00%	0	0.00%			-67	-6.82%	983
Ouachita	1,305	60.81%	630	29.36%	119	5.55%	0	0.00%	92	4.29%	675	31.45%	2,146
Perry	480	55.30%	302	34.79%	86	9.91%	0	0.00%			178	20.51%	868
Phillips	1,481	50.77%	1,331	45.63%	103	3.53%	2	0.07%			150	5.14%	2,917
Pike	656	53.51%	231	18.84%	338	27.57%	0	0.00%	1	0.08%	318	25.94%	1,226
Poinsett	493	81.09%	100	16.45%	13	2.14%	0	0.00%	2	0.33%	393	64.64%	608
Polk	455	43.71%	394	37.85%	192	18.44%	0	0.00%			61	5.86%	1,041
Pope	1,840	67.03%	679	24.74%	226	8.23%	0	0.00%			1,161	42.30%	2,745
Prairie	960	58.68%	604	36.92%	72	4.40%	0	0.00%			356	21.76%	1,636
Pulaski	3,392	53.18%	2,492	39.07%	489	7.67%	5	0.08%			900	14.11%	6,378
Randolph	1,542	84.73%	229	12.58%	49	2.69%	0	0.00%			1,313	72.14%	1,820
Saline	1,161	74.23%	326	20.84%	75	4.80%	2	0.13%			835	53.39%	1,564
Scott	967	61.87%	398	25.46%	198	12.67%	0	0.00%			569	36.40%	1,563
Searcy	513	43.40%	625	52.88%	44	3.72%	0	0.00%			-112	-9.48%	1,182
Sebastian	2,692	59.97%	1,558	34.71%	239	5.32%	0	0.00%			1,134	25.26%	4,489
Sevier	757	62.20%	186	15.28%	274	22.51%	0	0.00%			483	39.69%	1,217
Sharp	1,068	72.16%	308	20.81%	104	7.03%	0	0.00%			760	51.35%	1,480
St. Francis	697	35.18%	1,175	59.31%	109	5.50%	0	0.00%			-478	-24.13%	1,981
Stone	449	74.96%	150	25.04%	0	0.00%	0	0.00%			299	49.92%	599
Union	1,431	84.47%	106	6.26%	157	9.27%	0	0.00%			1,274	75.21%	1,694
Van Buren	673	61.63%	419	38.37%	0	0.00%	0	0.00%			254	23.26%	1,092
Washington	2,457	53.27%	1,871	40.57%	268	5.81%	16	0.35%			586	12.71%	4,612
White	1,863	54.16%	979	28.46%	516	15.00%	0	0.00%	82	2.38%	884	25.70%	3,440
Woodruff	1,407	60.67%	827	35.66%	85	3.67%	0	0.00%			580	25.01%	2,319
Yell	1,761	70.16%	600	23.90%	140	5.58%	0	0.00%	9	0.36%	1,161	46.25%	2,510
Totals	87,834	59.34%	46,983	31.74%	11,831	7.99%	113	0.08%	1,267	0.86%	40,851	27.60%	148,028

== See also ==
- United States presidential elections in Arkansas
