= 1892 United States presidential election in Mississippi =

- November 8, 1892

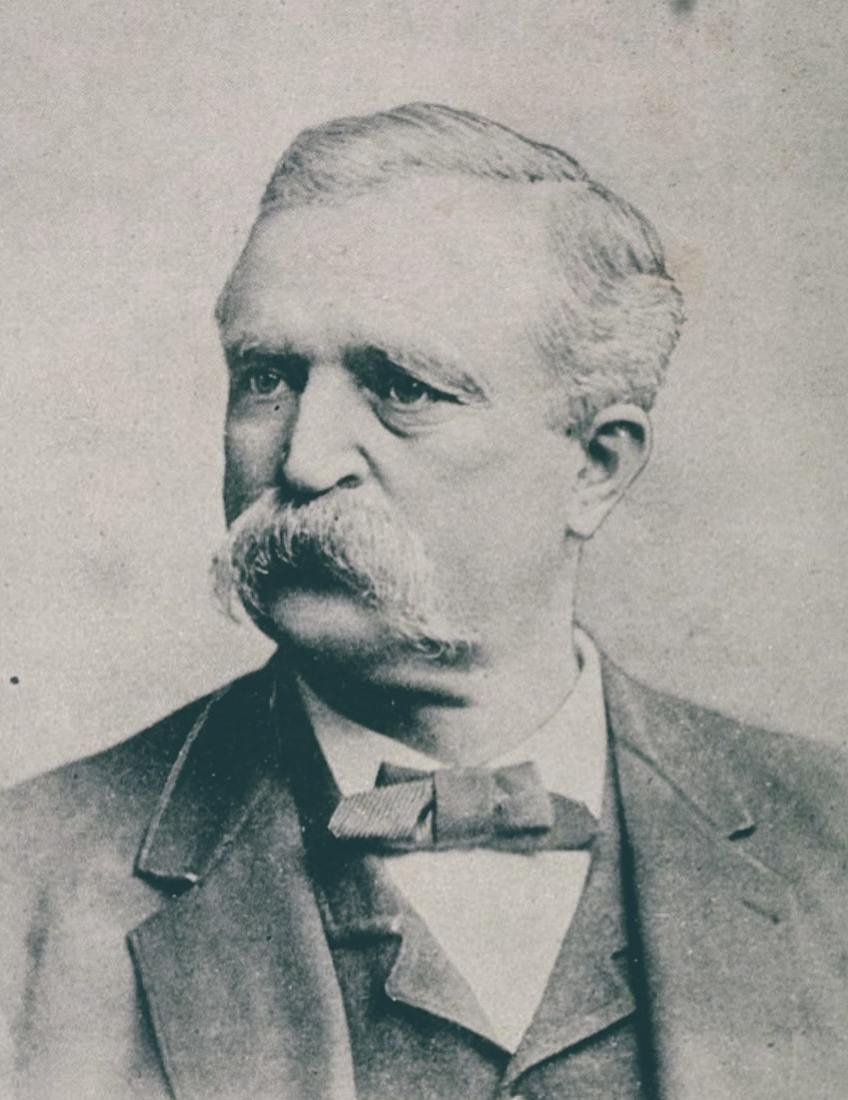
Nominee	Grover Cleveland	James B. Weaver
Party	Democratic	Populist
Home state	New York	Iowa
Running mate	Adlai Stevenson I	James G. Field
Electoral vote	9	0
Popular vote	40,030	10,118
Percentage	76.22%	19.27%
County results
Cleveland
50–60%
60–70%
70–80%
80–90%
90–100%
Weaver
40–50%
President before election
Benjamin Harrison
Republican
Elected President
Grover Cleveland
Democratic

The 1892 United States presidential election in Mississippi took place on November 8, 1892. All contemporary 44 states were part of the 1892 United States presidential election. Mississippi voters chose nine electors to the Electoral College, which selected the president and vice president.

This election arguably marked the end of Reconstruction in Mississippi, with voter turnout plunging by over half following the introduction of poll taxes in the state two years prior.

Mississippi was won by the Democratic nominees, former President Grover Cleveland of New York and his running mate Adlai Stevenson I of Illinois. However, Weaver performed well in the South as he won counties in Alabama, Georgia, Mississippi, North Carolina, and Texas. Weaver's win in Chickasaw County was the last time a Democrat lost any county in Mississippi in a statewide election until Herbert Hoover won the Pine Belt counties of Pearl River, Stone (Note: At the time of the 1892 election, Stone County was the northern part of Harrison County.) and George (Note: At the time of the 1892 election, what has been since 1910 George County was the northern part of Jackson County and the southern part of Greene County.) in 1928.

== Results ==
1892 United States presidential election in Mississippi
Party	Candidate	Votes	Percentage	Electoral votes
Democratic	Grover Cleveland	40,030	76.22%	9
People's	James B. Weaver	10,118	19.27%	0
Republican	Benjamin Harrison (incumbent)	1,398	2.66%	0
Prohibition	John Bidwell	973	1.85%	0
Totals		52,519	100.00%	9
Voter turnout				—

=== Results by county ===
County	Stephen Grover Cleveland Democratic		Benjamin Harrison Republican		James Baird Weaver People's		John Bidwell Prohibition		Margin (Note: Because Cleveland and Weaver ran in the top two places in Mississippi as a whole, margins given are Cleveland vote minus Weaver vote and Cleveland percentage minus Weaver percentage unless states otherwise.)		Total votes cast
County	#	%	#	%	#	%	#	%	#	%	Total votes cast
Adams	474	81.72%	82	14.14%	14	2.41%	10	1.72%	392 (Note: In this county where Harrison did run second ahead of Weaver, margin given is Cleveland vote minus Harrison vote and percentage margin Cleveland percentage minus Harrison percentage.)	67.59%	580
Alcorn	690	89.38%	52	6.74%	20	2.59%	10	1.30%	638	82.64%	772
Amite	576	74.51%	9	1.16%	180	23.29%	8	1.03%	396	51.23%	773
Attala	756	58.29%	13	1.00%	515	39.71%	13	1.00%	241	18.58%	1,297
Benton	423	78.04%	62	11.44%	37	6.83%	20	3.69%	361	66.61%	542
Bolivar	234	79.32%	25	8.47%	23	7.80%	13	4.41%	209	70.85%	295
Calhoun	613	67.21%	5	0.55%	285	31.25%	9	0.99%	328	35.96%	912
Carroll	624	59.77%	22	2.11%	377	36.11%	21	2.01%	247	23.66%	1,044
Chickasaw	332	42.56%	73	9.36%	368	47.18%	7	0.90%	-36	-4.62%	780
Choctaw	389	52.93%	19	2.59%	312	42.45%	15	2.04%	77	10.48%	735
Claiborne	425	87.63%	7	1.44%	43	8.87%	10	2.06%	382	78.76%	485
Clarke	628	83.29%	2	0.27%	108	14.32%	16	2.12%	520	68.97%	754
Clay	523	84.49%	6	0.97%	89	14.38%	1	0.16%	434	70.11%	619
Coahoma	272	79.77%	33	9.68%	36	10.56%	0	0.00%	236	69.21%	341
Copiah	1,041	65.31%	17	1.07%	494	30.99%	42	2.63%	547	34.32%	1,594
Covington	238	82.07%	9	3.10%	36	12.41%	7	2.41%	202	69.66%	290
De Soto	478	77.85%	18	2.93%	98	15.96%	20	3.26%	380	61.89%	614
Franklin	314	60.97%	10	1.94%	178	34.56%	13	2.52%	136	26.41%	515
Greene	181	89.60%	9	4.46%	12	5.94%	0	0.00%	169	83.66%	202
Grenada	400	88.50%	2	0.44%	47	10.40%	3	0.66%	353	78.10%	452
Hancock	256	89.82%	11	3.86%	11	3.86%	7	2.46%	245	85.96%	285
Harrison	360	85.11%	10	2.36%	39	9.22%	14	3.31%	321	75.89%	423
Hinds	1,216	86.00%	68	4.81%	92	6.51%	38	2.69%	1,124	79.49%	1,414
Holmes	641	74.36%	23	2.67%	176	20.42%	22	2.55%	465	53.94%	862
Issaquena	119	82.07%	25	17.24%	0	0.00%	1	0.69%	94	64.83%	145
Itawamba	794	70.64%	16	1.42%	297	26.42%	17	1.51%	497	44.22%	1,124
Jackson	453	90.06%	16	3.18%	20	3.98%	14	2.78%	433	86.08%	503
Jasper	675	90.48%	3	0.40%	64	8.58%	4	0.54%	611	81.90%	746
Jefferson	413	93.02%	20	4.50%	7	1.58%	4	0.90%	393	88.51%	444
Jones	390	78.16%	8	1.60%	91	18.24%	10	2.00%	299	59.92%	499
Kemper	651	73.73%	27	3.06%	198	22.42%	7	0.79%	453	51.30%	883
Lafayette	866	79.45%	48	4.40%	156	14.31%	20	1.83%	710	65.14%	1,090
Lauderdale	1,366	77.09%	24	1.35%	356	20.09%	26	1.47%	1,010	57.00%	1,772
Lawrence	386	66.55%	36	6.21%	145	25.00%	13	2.24%	241	41.55%	580
Leake	708	65.01%	15	1.38%	346	31.77%	20	1.84%	362	33.24%	1,089
Lee	749	67.48%	7	0.63%	348	31.35%	6	0.54%	401	36.13%	1,110
Leflore	339	97.41%	3	0.86%	0	0.00%	6	1.72%	336	96.55%	348
Lincoln	454	66.08%	36	5.24%	137	19.94%	60	8.73%	317	46.14%	687
Lowndes	666	95.83%	4	0.58%	18	2.59%	7	1.01%	648	93.24%	695
Madison	695	93.79%	8	1.08%	32	4.32%	6	0.81%	663	89.47%	741
Marion	263	74.29%	2	0.56%	88	24.86%	1	0.28%	175	49.44%	354
Marshall	1,097	85.97%	22	1.72%	120	9.40%	37	2.90%	977	76.57%	1,276
Monroe	1,073	85.36%	24	1.91%	132	10.50%	28	2.23%	941	74.86%	1,257
Montgomery	674	80.14%	7	0.83%	146	17.36%	14	1.66%	528	62.78%	841
Neshoba	589	71.05%	0	0.00%	239	28.83%	1	0.12%	350	42.22%	829
Newton	758	84.13%	3	0.33%	126	13.98%	14	1.55%	632	70.14%	901
Noxubee	492	91.28%	2	0.37%	44	8.16%	1	0.19%	448	83.12%	539
Oktibbeha	595	94.59%	0	0.00%	25	3.97%	9	1.43%	570	90.62%	629
Panola	624	67.97%	24	2.61%	248	27.02%	22	2.40%	376	40.96%	918
Pearl River	137	95.80%	2	1.40%	3	2.10%	1	0.70%	134	93.71%	143
Perry	202	84.87%	1	0.42%	28	11.76%	7	2.94%	174	73.11%	238
Pike	744	83.50%	35	3.93%	101	11.34%	11	1.23%	643	72.17%	891
Pontotoc	461	50.00%	9	0.98%	437	47.40%	15	1.63%	24	2.60%	922
Prentiss	633	67.48%	51	5.44%	246	26.23%	8	0.85%	387	41.26%	938
Quitman	71	75.53%	14	14.89%	3	3.19%	6	6.38%	57	60.64%	94
Rankin	748	83.11%	55	6.11%	75	8.33%	22	2.44%	673	74.78%	900
Scott	487	77.42%	0	0.00%	138	21.94%	4	0.64%	349	55.48%	629
Sharkey	135	84.38%	13	8.13%	7	4.38%	5	3.13%	122	76.25%	160
Simpson	332	67.89%	4	0.82%	149	30.47%	4	0.82%	183	37.42%	489
Smith	547	79.39%	12	1.74%	113	16.40%	17	2.47%	434	62.99%	689
Sunflower	213	97.26%	3	1.37%	0	0.00%	3	1.37%	210	95.89%	219
Tallahatchie	425	84.49%	8	1.59%	61	12.13%	9	1.79%	364	72.37%	503
Tate	801	73.49%	28	2.57%	248	22.75%	13	1.19%	553	50.73%	1,090
Tippah	755	72.46%	85	8.16%	194	18.62%	8	0.77%	561	53.84%	1,042
Tishomingo	612	82.15%	58	7.79%	63	8.46%	12	1.61%	549	73.69%	745
Tunica	124	82.67%	13	8.67%	9	6.00%	4	2.67%	111	74.00%	150
Union	721	61.36%	14	1.19%	420	35.74%	20	1.70%	301	25.62%	1,175
Warren	631	88.87%	28	3.94%	37	5.21%	14	1.97%	594	83.66%	710
Washington	600	94.94%	20	3.16%	0	0.00%	12	1.90%	580	91.77%	632
Wayne	390	87.05%	6	1.34%	48	10.71%	4	0.89%	342	76.34%	448
Webster	414	50.43%	16	1.95%	383	46.65%	8	0.97%	31	3.78%	821
Wilkinson	258	93.48%	6	2.17%	8	2.90%	4	1.45%	250	90.58%	276
Winston	357	59.80%	4	0.67%	225	37.69%	11	1.84%	132	22.11%	597
Yalobusha	715	75.03%	12	1.26%	210	22.04%	16	1.68%	505	52.99%	953
Yazoo	738	86.42%	3	0.35%	111	13.00%	2	0.23%	627	73.42%	854
Totals	40,224	76.06%	1,467	2.77%	10,290	19.46%	907	1.71%	29,934	56.60%	52,888

== See also ==
- United States presidential elections in Mississippi
