= 2024 Lamar Cardinals football team =

American college football season

2024 Lamar Cardinals football
- Conference: Southland Conference
- Record: 7–5 (4–3 Southland)
- Head coach: Peter Rossomando (2nd season)
- Offensive coordinator: Will Fleming (2nd season)
- Offensive scheme: Spread option
- Defensive coordinator: Drew Christ (2nd season)
- Base defense: 4–3
- Home stadium: Provost Umphrey Stadium

2024 Southland Conference football standings
	Conf.			Overall
Team	W		L	W		L
No. 6 Incarnate Word $^	7	–	0	11	–	3
Southeastern Louisiana	6	–	1	7	–	5
Stephen F. Austin	4	–	3	7	–	5
Lamar	4	–	3	7	–	5
McNeese	3	–	4	6	–	6
Houston Christian	3	–	4	5	–	7
East Texas A&M*	2	–	4	3	–	9
Nicholls	2	–	5	4	–	8
Northwestern State	0	–	7	0	–	12
$ – Conference champion; ^ – FCS playoff participant; * – East Texas A&M was ineligible for FCS postseason play due to transition from NCAA Division II.; Rankings from STATS Poll

The 2024 Lamar Cardinals football team represented Lamar University in the 2024 NCAA Division I FCS football season. The Cardinals played their home games at Provost Umphrey Stadium in Beaumont, Texas, and competed in the Southland Conference. They were led by second–year head coach Pete Rossomando. The Cardinals finished the season with a 7–5 overall record, and a 4–3 record in Southland Conference play tied with Stephen F. Austin for a third–place conference finish. The 2023–24 seasons mark the Cardinal's first consecutive winning seasons since 1966–67.

== Preseason ==
=== Recruiting ===
Back	B	Center	C	Cornerback	CB	Defensive back	DB
Defensive end	DE	Defensive lineman	DL	Defensive tackle	DT	End	E
Fullback	FB	Guard	G	Halfback	HB	Kicker	K
Kickoff returner	KR	Offensive tackle	OT	Offensive lineman	OL	Linebacker	LB
Long snapper	LS	Punter	P	Punt returner	PR	Quarterback	QB
Running back	RB	Safety	S	Tight end	TE	Wide receiver	WR

==== Incoming transfers ====
The Cardinals added 9 transfer players. Two were signed during the early signing period. The remaining seven were signed on National Signing Day.

Name	Pos.	Height	Weight	Hometown	Year	Prev school
Christian Booker	DL	6’2	277	Humble, TX	Junior	East Texas Baptist
Xavier Coleman	RB	5’8	185	Willingsboro, NJ	Junior	Boston College
Dominic Eldridge	OL	6’5	310	Dallas, TX	Junior	Blinn
Edward Gilds	DB	6’0	185	New Orleans, LA	Junior	Riverside City College
Ronnie Hamrick	DB	6’0	195	Lilburn, GA	Junior	Texas State
DeJuan Lewis	DB	5’10	195	Pearland, TX	Sophomore	Prairie View A&M
Hamilton Moore	DB	6’0	220	Raleigh, NC	Senior	Yale
Dameon Smallwood	OL	6’5	315	Denison, TX	Junior	North Texas
Amari Williams	DL	6’0	220	North Miami Beach, FL	Junior	Fullerton College/Liberty

==== Incoming high school recruits ====
Sources: Lamar signed 20 high school recruits with 15 signed on Early Signing Day and 5 added on National Signing Day.

College recruiting (2024)
Name	Hometown	School	Height	Weight	40^{‡}	Commit date
Kmare Balfour; TE	Killeen, TX	Shoemaker High School	6 ft 3 in (1.91 m)	220 lb (100 kg)	–	
Kmare Balfour; TE	Recruit ratings: No ratings found					
Jackson Bandy; OLB	Nolensville, TN	Nolensville High School	6 ft 2 in (1.88 m)	211 lb (96 kg)	–	
Jackson Bandy; OLB	Recruit ratings: No ratings found					
Nicholas Brown; DB	Cypress, TX	Cy Springs High School	6 ft 0 in (1.83 m)	158 lb (72 kg)	–	
Nicholas Brown; DB	Recruit ratings: No ratings found					
Zion Carter; OLB	McKinney, TX	McKinney North High School	6 ft 1 in (1.85 m)	213 lb (97 kg)	–	
Zion Carter; OLB	Recruit ratings: No ratings found					
Emonte "Cash" Cross; RB	Center, TX	Center High School	6 ft 2 in (1.88 m)	192 lb (87 kg)	–	
Emonte "Cash" Cross; RB	Recruit ratings: 247Sports:					
Dillon Dixon; LB	Houston, TX	North Shore High School	6 ft 1 in (1.85 m)	215 lb (98 kg)	–	
Dillon Dixon; LB	Recruit ratings: No ratings found					
Brady Driver; QB	Sulphur Springs, TX	Sulphur Springs High School	6 ft 0 in (1.83 m)	200 lb (91 kg)		
Brady Driver; QB	Recruit ratings: No ratings found					
Aidan Grummer; TE	Argyle, TX	Liberty Christian High School	6 ft 2 in (1.88 m)	246 lb (112 kg)	–	
Aidan Grummer; TE	Recruit ratings: No ratings found					
Jordan James; DB	Spring, TX	Westfield High School	6 ft 1 in (1.85 m)	186 lb (84 kg)	–	
Jordan James; DB	Recruit ratings: No ratings found					
Isaiah Menefee; DB/LB	Lufkin, TX	Lufkin High School	6 ft 2 in (1.88 m)	197 lb (89 kg)	–	
Isaiah Menefee; DB/LB	Recruit ratings: No ratings found					
CJ Miller; ILB	Anna, TX	Anna High School	5 ft 11 in (1.80 m)	214 lb (97 kg)	–	
CJ Miller; ILB	Recruit ratings: No ratings found					
Jameer Muhammad; DE	Fort Worth, TX	Amon Carter Riverside High School	5 ft 10 in (1.78 m)	177 lb (80 kg)	–	
Jameer Muhammad; DE	Recruit ratings: No ratings found					
Omarion Rasberry; RB	Garrison, TX	Garrison High School	5 ft 8 in (1.73 m)	170 lb (77 kg)	–	
Omarion Rasberry; RB	Recruit ratings: No ratings found					
Nick Rossamondo; ILB	Lumberton, TX	Lumberton High School	5 ft 9 in (1.75 m)	238 lb (108 kg)	–	
Nick Rossamondo; ILB	Recruit ratings: No ratings found					
Endrei Sauls; OL	Temple, TX	Temple High School	6 ft 2 in (1.88 m)	300 lb (140 kg)	–	
Endrei Sauls; OL	Recruit ratings: No ratings found					
Britain Simmons; OL	Jasper, TX	Jasper High School	5 ft 11 in (1.80 m)	165 lb (75 kg)	–	
Britain Simmons; OL	Recruit ratings: No ratings found					
Carldell Simmons; WR	Monroe, LA	Ouachita Parish High School	5 ft 7 in (1.70 m)	160 lb (73 kg)	–	
Carldell Simmons; WR	Recruit ratings: No ratings found					
IyiolaOluwa Solomi; OL	Denton, TX	Braswell High School	6 ft 0 in (1.83 m)	268 lb (122 kg)	–	
IyiolaOluwa Solomi; OL	Recruit ratings: No ratings found					
Grayden Spencer; DL	Lumberton, TX	Lumber High School	6 ft 3 in (1.91 m)	270 lb (120 kg)	–	
Grayden Spencer; DL	Recruit ratings: No ratings found					
Zaylon Stoker; DL	Kilgore, TX	Kilgore High School	6 ft 0 in (1.83 m)	165 lb (75 kg)	–	
Zaylon Stoker; DL	Recruit ratings: No ratings found					
Overall recruit ranking:
Note: In many cases, Scout, Rivals, 247Sports, On3, and ESPN may conflict in their listings of height and weight.; In these cases, the average was taken. ESPN grades are on a 100-point scale.; Sources: "2024 Team Ranking". Rivals.com.

=== Preseason poll ===
The Southland Conference released their preseason poll on July 22, 2024. The Cardinals were picked to finish fourth in the conference and received one first-place vote.

=== Preseason All–Southland Teams ===
The Southland Conference announced the 2024 preseason all-conference football team selections on July 22, 2024. Lamar had a total of 12 players selected.

Offense

1st Team

- Andre Dennis – wide receiver, JR
- Jevale Roberson – offensive lineman, SR
- Elias Ripley – offensive lineman, SR

2nd Team

- Khalan Griffin – running back, SR
- Deryn Gibbs – tight end/halfback, JR
- Sevonne Rhea – wide receiver, SR
- Reggie Brooks – offensive lineman, JR
- Chris Esqueda – placekicker, SR

Defense

1st Team

- Caleb Williams – defensive lineman, SR
- Ramond Stevens – defensive back, SR

2nd Team

- Jaymond Jackson – defensive lineman, SR
- Kristian Pugh – defensive back, JR

== Schedule ==
Date	Time	Opponent	Rank	Site	TV	Result	Attendance
August 31	7:00 pm	at Texas State*		UFCU Stadium; San Marcos, TX	ESPN+	L 27–34	19,637
September 7	7:00 pm	Mississippi Valley State*		Provost Umphrey Stadium; Beaumont, TX	ESPN+	W 28–14	5,574
September 14	6:00 pm	No. 20 Weber State*		Provost Umphrey Stadium; Beaumont, TX	ESPN+	W 17–16	5,981
September 21	6:00 pm	Texas Southern*	No. 22	Provost Umphrey Stadium; Beaumont, TX	ESPN+	W 20–17	8,443
September 28	6:00 pm	at No. 7 Central Arkansas*	No. 19	Estes Stadium; Conway, AR	ESPN+	L 14–34	9,873
October 12	3:00 pm	Stephen F. Austin^{†}	No. 22	Provost Umphrey Stadium; Beaumont, TX	ESPN+	L 20–27	8,368
October 19	3:30 pm	at Texas A&M–Commerce		Ernest Hawkins Field at Memorial Stadium; Commerce, TX	ESPN+	W 29–20	5,437
October 26	2:00 pm	at Northwestern State		Harry Turpin Stadium; Natchitoches, LA	ESPN+	W 42–10	6,865
November 2	3:00 pm	Southeastern Louisiana		Provost Umphrey Stadium; Beaumont, TX	ESPN+	L 27–30	5,593
November 9	2:00 pm	at No. 8 Incarnate Word		Gayle and Tom Benson Stadium; San Antonio, TX	ESPN+	L 20–41	2,055
November 16	3:00 pm	Nicholls		Provost Umphrey Stadiuim; Beaumont, TX	ESPN+	W 24–7	6,275
November 23	7:00 pm	at McNeese		Cowboy Stadium; Lake Charles, LA (Battle of the Border)	ESPN+	W 26–24	7,244
*Non-conference game; ^{†}Homecoming; Rankings from STATS Poll released prior to the game; All times are in Central time

== Rankings ==
Ranking movements Legend: ██ Increase in ranking ██ Decrease in ranking — = Not ranked RV = Received votes
	Week													
Poll	Pre	1	2	3	4	5	6	7	8	9	10	11	12	Final
STATS FCS	—	RV	RV	22	19	24	22	RV	RV	RV	—	—	—	—
Coaches	—	—	RV	RV	25	RV	RV	RV	RV	RV	RV	—	—	—

== Game summaries ==
=== at Texas State ===
Game One – Lamar Cardinals (0–1; 0–0) at Texas State Bobcats (FBS) (1–0; 0–0) - Game summary

Quarter	1	2	3	4	Total
Cardinals	0	0	10	17	27
Bobcats (FBS)	15	3	3	13	34

at Bobcat Stadium, San Marcos, Texas

- Date: August 31
- Game time: 7:00 pm
- Game weather: Wind: • Weather: Cloudy • Temp:
- Game attendance: 19,637
- Referee: Steven Robinson
- TV announcers (ESPN+): Brant Freeman (play-by-play) and Keith Moreland (analyst)

Game information

First Quarter

- (13:44) TXST – Jaden Williams 34-yard pass from Jaden McCloud (Mason Shipley kick), Bobcats 7–0. Drive: 4 plays, 68 yards, 1:12.
- (7:02) TXST – Ismail Mahdi 1-yard run (David Nunez pass to Konner Fox), Bobcats 15–0. Drive: 9 plays, 55 yards, 3:57.

Second Quarter

- (12:44) TXST – Mason Shipley 40-yard field goal, Bobcats 18–0. Drive: 10 plays, 46 yards, 3:38.

Third Quarter

- (13:37) LU – Damien Moore 18-yard run (Chris Esqueda kick), Bobcats 18–7. Drive: 5 plays, 75 yards, 1:23.
- (10:28) TXST – Mason Shipley 46-yard field goal, Bobcats 21–7. Drive: 11 plays, 36 yards, 3:09.
- (2:58) LU – Chris Esqueda 28-yard field goal, Bobcats 21–10. Drive: 13 plays, 64 yards, 7:30.

Fourth Quarter

- (13:44) LU – Sevonne Rhea 47-yard pass from Robert Coleman (Chris Esqueda kick), Bobcats 21–17. Drive: 6 plays, 84 yards, 1:20.
- (9:30) TXST – Joey Hobert 37-yard pass from Jordan McCloud (Mason Shipley kick), Bobcats 28–17. Drive: 9 plays, 75 yards, 4:14.
- (5:29) TXST – Joey Hobert 30-yard pass from Jordan McCloud (kick failed), Bobcats 34–17. Drive: 4 plays, 47 yards, 1:45.
- (4:11) LU – Jayden Boyd 9-yard pass from Robert Coleman (Chris Esqueda kick), Bobcats 34–24. Drive: 5 plays, 75 yards, 1:18.
- (0:37) LU – Chris Esqueda 27-yard field goal, Bobcats 34–27. Drive: 9 plays, 34 yards, 1:47.

Statistics	LAM	TXST
First downs	18	39
Total yards	63–288	81–486
Rushing yards	29–51	41–213
Passing yards	237	273
Passing: Comp–Att–Int	16–34–0	28–40–1
Time of possession	27:56	31:59

Team	Category	Player	Statistics
Lamar	Passing	Robert Coleman	16/34, 237 yards, 2 TD
Lamar	Rushing	Khalan Griffin	16 carries, 71 yards
Lamar	Receiving	Kyndon Fuselier	6 receptions, 107 yards
Texas State	Passing	Jordan McCloud	21/30, 238 yards, 3 TD, INT
Texas State	Rushing	Ismail Mahdi	28 carries, 156 yards, TD
Texas State	Receiving	Joey Hobert	6 receptions, 91 yards, 2 TD

=== Mississippi Valley State ===
Game Two – Mississippi Valley State Delta Devils (0–2; 0–0) at Lamar Cardinals (1–1; 0–0) - Game summary

Quarter	1	2	3	4	Total
Delta Devils	7	0	7	0	14
Cardinals	14	7	0	7	28

at Provost Umphrey Stadium, Beaumont, Texas

- Date: September 7
- Game time: 6:00 pm
- Game weather: Wind: NE 14mph • Weather: Sunny • Temp: 88
- Game attendance: 5,574
- Referee: Gary Leeper
- TV: ESPN+
- Box Score

Game information

First Quarter

- (10:11) LU – Rhea, Sevonne 10 yd pass from Coleman, Robert (Esqueda, Chris kick) 8 plays, 77 yards, Cardinals 0–7. Drive: 8 plays, 77 yards, 2:17.
- (4:52) MVS – Thomas, Remiello 4 yd pass from Williams, Ty'Jarian (Jovisic, Marko kick), Tie 7–7. Drive: 12 plays, 75 yards, 5:19.
- (00:00) LU – Griffin, Khalan 1 yd run (Esqueda, Chris kick), Cardinals 14–7. Drive: 10 plays, 70 yards, 4:46.

Second Quarter

- (1:36) LU – Hyder, JaCorey 63 yd pass from Coleman, Robert (Esqueda, Chris kick), Cardinals 0–21. Drive: 1 play, 636 yards, 0:07.

Third Quarter

- (06:13) MVS – Ross, Kerrick 20 yd pass from Sisk, Jaydyn (Jovisic, Marko kick), Cardinals 14–21. Drive: 9 plays, 55 yards, 4:46.

Fourth Quarter

- (01:04) LU – Griffin, Khalan 1 yd run (Esqueda, Chris kick), Cardinals 14–28. Drive: 9 plays, 84 yards, 5:06.

Statistics	MVSU	LAM
First downs	20	24
Total yards	72–280	67–438
Rushing yards	36–72	37–222
Passing yards	208	216
Passing: Comp–Att–Int	21–36–2	12–30–1
Time of possession	31:47	28:13

Team	Category	Player	Statistics
Mississippi Valley State	Passing	Jayden Sisk	18/31, 171 yards, 1 TD
Mississippi Valley State	Rushing	Ty'Jarian Williams	10 carries, 45 yards
Mississippi Valley State	Receiving	Nathan Rembert	9 receptions, 95 yards
Lamar	Passing	Robert Coleman	12/30, 216 yards, 2 TD, 1 INT
Lamar	Rushing	Khalan Griffin	23 carries, 197 yards, 2 TD
Lamar	Receiving	JaCorey Hyder	4 receptions, 117 yards, 1 TD

=== No. 20 Weber State ===
Game Three – No. 20 Weber State Wildcats (1–2; 1–0) at Lamar Cardinals (2–1; 0–0) - Game summary

Quarter	1	2	3	4	Total
No. 20 Wildcats	0	10	6	0	16
Cardinals	3	7	7	0	17

at Provost Umphrey Stadium, Beaumont, Texas

- Date: September 14
- Game time: 6:00 pm
- Game weather: Wind:SW 8mph • Weather: Sunny • Temp: 90
- Game attendance: 5,981
- Referee: Craig Heiser
- TV: ESPN+
- Box Score

Game information

First Quarter

- (7:42) LU – Esqueda, Chris 23 yd field goal 8 plays, 77 yards, Cardinals 0–3. Drive: 14 plays, 69 yards, TOP 07:10

Second Quarter

- (7:20) LU – Rhea, Sevonne 7 yd pass from Longino, Jakolby (Esqueda, Chris kick), Cardinals 0–10. Drive: 11 plays, 82 yards, TOP 05:37
- (3:07) WSU – Thompson, Kyle 42 yd field goal, Cardinals 3–10. Drive: 11 plays, 50 yards, TOP 04:13
- (2:20) WSU – Pate, Montae 30 yd interception (Thompson, Kyle), Tied 10–10.

Third Quarter

- (11:14) WSU – May, Colter 2 yd pass from Munoz, Richie ( ), Wildcats 16–10. Drive: 9 plays, 65 yards, TOP 03:37
- (9:00) LU – Moore, Damien 72 yd pass from Longino, Jakolby (Esqueda, Chris kick), Cardinals 16–17. Drive: 4 plays, 80 yards, TOP 02:06

Fourth Quarter

- No scores

Statistics	WEB	LAM
First downs	18	16
Total yards	66–331	62–385
Rushing yards	36–147	42–203
Passing yards	185	182
Passing: Comp–Att–Int	22–30–0	11–20–1
Time of possession	27:33	32:21

Team	Category	Player	Statistics
Weber State	Passing	Richie Munoz	22/30, 184 yards, 1 TD
Weber State	Rushing	Damon Bankston	23 carries, 84 yards 1 TD
Weber State	Receiving	Jacob Sharp	7 receptions, 81 yards
Lamar	Passing	Jakolby Longino	5/6, 121 yards, 2 TD
Lamar	Rushing	Khalan Griffin	21 carries, 91 yards
Lamar	Receiving	Damien Moore	1 reception, 72 yards 1 TD

=== Texas Southern ===
Game Four – Texas Southern Tigers (1–2; 1–0) at No. 22 Lamar Cardinals (3–1; 0–0) - Game summary

Quarter	1	2	3	4	Total
Tigers	3	7	0	7	17
No. 22 Cardinals	0	0	7	13	20

at Provost Umphrey Stadium, Beaumont, Texas

- Date: September 21
- Game time: 6:00 pm
- Game weather: Wind: SE 10mph • Weather: Sunny • Temp: 88
- Game attendance: 8,443
- Referee: Ed Bourgeois
- TV: ESPN+
- Box Score

Game information

First Quarter

- (05:29) TSU – Romero, Gustavo 20 yd field goal Drive: 16 plays, 72 yards, TOP 09:31, Tigers 3–0.

Second Quarter

- (01:05) TSU – Lewis, Chaunzavia 7 yd run (Romero, Gustavo kick) Drive: 2 plays, 14 yards, TOP 00:47, Tigers 10–0.

Third Quarter

- (05:00) LU – Griffin, Khalan 1 yd run (Esqueda, Chris kick) Drive: 8 plays, 40 yards, TOP 05:41, Tigers 10–7.

Fourth Quarter

- (08:32) LU – Gibbs, Devyn 13 yd pass from Longino, Jakolby (Extra point failed) Drive: 12 plays, 66 yards, TOP 06:23, Cardinals 10–13.
- (03:48) TSU – Lewis, Chaunzavia 6 yd run (Romero, Gustavo kick) Drive: 8 plays, 67 yards, TOP 04:37, Tigers 17–13.
- (01:05) LU – Griffin, Khalan 3 yd run (Esqueda, Chris kick) Drive: 12 plays, 76 yards, TOP 02:40, Cardinals 17–20.

Statistics	TXSO	LAM
First downs	18	17
Total yards	59–278	52–249
Rushing yards	49–223	35–186
Passing yards	55	63
Passing: Comp–Att–Int	6–10–0	9–17–1
Time of possession	35:17	24:43

Team	Category	Player	Statistics
Texas Southern	Passing	Jordan Davis	6/10, 55 yards, 0 TD
Texas Southern	Rushing	Quintell Quinn	23 carries, 149 yards 0 TD
Texas Southern	Receiving	Kerien Charlo	2 receptions, 23 yards 0 TD
Lamar	Passing	Jakolby Longino	9/16, 63 yards, 1 TD
Lamar	Rushing	Khalan Griffin	22 carries, 132 yards 2 TD
Lamar	Receiving	Izaha Jones	3 receptions, 27 yards 0 TD

=== at No. 7 Central Arkansas ===
Game Five – No. 19 Lamar Cardinals (3–2; 0–0) at No. 7 Central Arkansas Bears (4–1; 1–0) - Game summary

Quarter	1	2	3	4	Total
No. 19 Cardinals	0	7	7	0	14
No. 7 Bears	10	10	7	7	34

at Estes Stadium, Conway, Arkansas

- Date: September 28
- Game time: 6:00 pm
- Game weather: Weather: Sunny
- Game attendance: 9,873
- Referee: Michael Frain
- TV: ESPN+
- Box Score

Game information

First Quarter

- (06:32 UCA – Courtney, Dax 12 yd pass from McElvain, Will (Gaster, Jake kick) Drive: 8 plays, 80 yards, TOP 05:31, UCA 0–7.
- (03:48 UCA – Gaster, Jake 23 yd field goa Drive: 4 plays, 5 yards, TOP 01:15, UCA 0–10.

Second Quarter

- (08:04) LU – Griffin, Khalan 1 yd run (Woodard, Ben kick) Drive: 2 plays, 10 yards, TOP 00:25, UCA 7–10.
- (04:14) UCA – Powell, ShunDerrick 11 yd run (Gaster, Jake kick) Drive: 9 plays, 75 yards, TOP 03:50, UCA 7–17.
- (00:00) UCA – Gaster, Jake 28 yd field goal Drive: 12 plays, 69 yards, TOP 01:53, UCA 7–20.

Third Quarter

- (06:31) UCA – Hale, Darius 5 yd run (Gaster, Jake kick) Drive: 3 plays, 30 yards, TOP 01:34, UCA 7–27.
- (01:02) LU – Coleman, Robert 16 yd run (Woodard, Ben kick) Drive: 10 plays, 75 yards, TOP 05:29, UCA 14–27.

Fourth Quarter

- (12:26) UCA – Powell, ShunDerrick 18 yd run (Gaster, Jake kick) Drive: 8 plays, 75 yards, TOP 03:36, UCA 14–34.

Statistics	LAM	UCA
First downs	16	26
Total yards	220	439
Rushing yards	108	281
Passing yards	112	158
Passing: Comp–Att–Int	11-20-1	5-22-1
Time of possession	26:28	33:32

Team	Category	Player	Statistics
Lamar	Passing	Robert Coleman	11/20 122 yds. 1 INT
Lamar	Rushing	Khalan Griffin	18 carries, 74 yds, 1 TD
Lamar	Receiving	Sevonne Rhea	5 Receptions, 55 yds
Central Arkansas	Passing	Will McElvain	15/22 158 yds, 1 TD, 1 INT
Central Arkansas	Rushing	ShunDerrick Powell	25 carries, 187 yds, 2 TD
Central Arkansas	Receiving	Trejan Bridges	4 receptions, 60 yds

=== Stephen F. Austin ===
Game Six – Stephen F. Austin Lumberjacks (4–2; 1–1) at No. 22 Lamar Cardinals (3–3; 0–1) - Game summary

Quarter	1	2	3	4	Total
Lumberjacks	10	3	14	0	27
No. 22 Cardinals	0	7	6	7	20

at Provost Umphrey Stadium, Beaumont, Texas

- Date: October 12
- Game time: 3:02 pm
- Game weather: Sunny • Temperature: 87 °F (31 °C) • Wind: NE at 6 miles per hour (9.7 km/h)
- Game attendance: 8,368
- TV: ESPN+
- Box Score

Game information

First Quarter

- SFA – 11:54 Harris, Kylon 36 yd pass from Vidlak, Sam (Campos, Chris kick),SFA 7–0 Drive: 5 plays, 74 yards, 2:06
- SFA – 4:46 Campos, Chris 31 yd field goal,SFA 10–0 Drive: 11 plays, 67 yards, 4:06

Second Quarter

- SFA – 12:30 Campos, Chris 25 yd field goal,SFA 13–0 Drive: 7 plays, 82 yards, 2:30
- LU – 7:07 Griffin, Khalan 2 yd run (Esqueda, Chris kick),SFA 13–7 Drive: 7 plays, 84 yards, 2:54

Third Quarter

- SFA – 9:34 Jones, Qualan 13 yd run (Campos, Chris kick),SFA 27–13 Drive: 11 plays, 57 yards, 5:20
- LU – 3:55 Rhea, Sevonne 80 yd pass from Coleman, Robert ( ),SFA 20–13 Drive: 1 play, 80 yards, 0:12
- SFA – 0:50 Jones, Qualan 10 yd run (Campos, Chris kick),SFA 27–13 Drive: 9 plays, 75 yards, 3:05

Fourth Quarter

- LU – 9:00 Longino, Jakolby 2 yd run (Esqueda, Chris kick),SFA 27–20 Drive: 12 plays, 75 yards, 6:50

Statistics	SFA	LAM
First downs	24	25
Total yards	64–443	78–456
Rushing yards	27–114	36–162
Passing yards	329	294
Passing: Comp–Att–Int	26–37–0	23–42–1
Time of possession	27:08	32:52

Team	Category	Player	Statistics
Stephen F. Austin	Passing	Sam Vidlak	26/37, 329 yards, TD
Stephen F. Austin	Rushing	Qualan Jones	21 carries, 119 yards, 2 TD
Stephen F. Austin	Receiving	Kylon Harris	10 receptions, 106 yards, TD
Lamar	Passing	Robert Coleman	22/41, 279 yards, TD, INT
Lamar	Rushing	Khalan Griffin	11 carries, 59 yards, TD
Lamar	Receiving	Sevonne Rhea	6 receptions, 166 yards, TD

=== at Texas A&M–Commerce ===
Game Seven – Lamar Cardinals (4–3; 1–1) at Texas A&M–Commerce Lions (3–6; 1–2) - Game summary

Quarter	1	2	3	4	Total
Cardinals	3	14	0	12	29
Lions	3	7	7	3	20

at Ernest Hawkins Field at Memorial Stadium, Commerce, Texas

- Date: October 19
- Game time: 3:30 pm
- Game weather: Wind: E 7 mph • Weather: Sunny • Temp: 78 °F (26 °C)
- Game attendance: 5,437
- Referee: Gary Leeper
- TV: ESPN+
- Box score

Game information

First Quarter

- LAM – Ben Woodard 46-yard field goal, 10:07. Cardinals 3–0. Drive: 6 plays, 18 yards, 2:21.
- AMC – Luke Jackson 30-yard field goal, 5:14. Tied 3–3. Drive: 11 plays, 62 yards, 4:53.

Second Quarter

- LAM – Robert Coleman 10-yard run (Ben Woodard kick), 13:00. Cardinals 10–3. Drive: 12 plays, 77 yards, 7:10.
- LAM – Devyn Gibbs 12-yard pass from Robert Coleman (Ben Woodard kick), 6:10. Cardinals 17–3. Drive: 11 plays, 80 yards, 5:07.
- AMC – Christian Jourdain 9-yard pass from Ron Peace (Luke Jackson kick), 0:50. Cardinals 17–10. Drive: 11 plays, 66 yards, 2:10.

Third Quarter

- AMC – Jaden Proctor 6-yard pass from Ron Peace (Luke Jackson kick), 4:21. Tied 17–17. Drive: 3 plays, 46 yards, 1:10.

Fourth Quarter

- LAM – Ben Woodard 37-yard field goal, 6:13. Cardinals 20–17. Drive: 10 plays, 29 yards, 4:36.
- AMC – Luke Jackson 52-yard field goal, 1:55. Tied 20–20. Drive: 10 plays, 40 yards, 4:18.
- LAM – Ben Woodard 51-yard field goal, 0:11. Cardinals 23–20. Drive: 9 plays, 36 yards, 1:38.
- LAM – Jaymond Jackson 2-yard fumble return, 0:00. Cardinals 29–20.

Statistics	LAM	TAMC
First downs	23	17
Total yards	73–388	62–269
Rushing yards	44–262	21–27
Passing yards	126	242
Passing: Comp–Att–Int	14–29–0	24–41–1
Time of possession	33:28	26:32

Team	Category	Player	Statistics
Lamar	Passing	Robert Coleman	12/26, 98 yards, TD
Lamar	Rushing	Khalan Griffin	23 carries, 158 yards
Lamar	Receiving	Devyn Gibbs	4 receptions, 39 yards, TD
Texas A&M-Commerce	Passing	Ron Peace	22/38, 237 yards, 2 TD, INT
Texas A&M-Commerce	Rushing	K. J. Shankle	6 carries, 15 yards
Texas A&M-Commerce	Receiving	Christian Jourdain	8 receptions, 136 yards, TD

=== at Northwestern State ===
Game Eight – Lamar Cardinals (5–3; 2–1) at Northwestern State Demons (0–9; 0–4) - Game summary

Quarter	1	2	3	4	Total
Cardinals	7	14	21	0	42
Demons	0	7	0	3	10

at Harry Turpin Stadium • Natchitoches, Louisiana

- Date: Saturday, October 26, 2024
- Game time: 2:00 pm CDT
- Game weather: Wind: W 0mph • Weather: Clear • Temp: 88
- Game attendance: 6,865
- Referee: Matt Beck
- TV announcers (ESPN+): Patrick Netherton (play-by-play) and Gary Reasons (analyst)
- Box score

Game information

First Quarter

- LU – 2:08 Rhea, Sevonne 45 yd pass from Coleman, Robert (Woodard, Ben kick),LU 7–0 Drive: 4 plays, 80 yards, 1:38

Second Quarter

- LU – 8:49 Coleman, Robert 1 yd run (Woodard, Ben kick),LU 14–0 Drive: 13 plays, 55 yards, 7:13
- LU – 5:50 Coleman, Robert 2 yd run (Woodard, Ben kick),LU 21–0 Drive: 3 plays, 34 yards, 1:24
- NSU – 0:19 Davis, Zay 5 yd run (Honshtein, Reed kick),LU 21–7 Drive: 6 plays, 80 yards, 0:46

Third Quarter

- LU – 14:03 Dennis, Andre 32 yd pass from Coleman, Robert (Woodard, Ben kick),LU 28–7 Drive: 3 plays, 42 yards, 0:57
- LU – 08:10 Griffin, Khalan 1 yd run (Woodard, Ben kick),LU 35–7 Drive: 8 plays, 71 yards, 4:32
- LU – 05:01 Carver, RJ 11 yd pass from Coleman, Robert (Woodard, Ben kick),LU 42–7 Drive: 2 plays, 11 yards, 0:10

Fourth Quarter

- NSU – 05:17 Honshtein, Reed 27 yd field goal,LU 42–10 Drive: 14 plays, 71 yards, 6:40

Statistics	LAM	NWST
First downs	22	18
Total yards	493	329
Rushing yards	268	98
Passing yards	225	231
Passing: Comp–Att–Int	11-17-0	19-38-2
Time of possession	29:28	30:32

Team	Category	Player	Statistics
Lamar	Passing	Robert Coleman	8/14, 202 yds, 3 TD
Lamar	Rushing	Khalan Griffin	19 carries, 120 yds, 1 TD
Lamar	Receiving	Sevonne Rhea	2 receptions, 74 yds, 1 TD
Northwestern State	Passing	Quaterius Hawkins	14/25, 139 yds, 2 INT
Northwestern State	Rushing	Kareame Cotton	5 carries, 40 yds
Northwestern State	Receiving	Myles Kit-Denton	5 receptions, 77 yds

=== Southeastern Louisiana ===
Game Nine – Southeastern Louisiana Lions (5–5; 4–1) at Lamar Cardinals (5–4; 2–2) - Game summary

Quarter	1	2	3	4	OT	Total
Lions	0	7	14	3	6	30
Cardinals	7	7	3	7	3	27

at Provost Umphrey Stadium, Beaumont, Texas

- Date: November 2
- Game time: 3:02 pm
- Game weather: Wind: SE 14mph • Weather: Cloudy • Temp: 82
- Game attendance: 5,593
- TV: ESPN+
- Box Score

Game information

First Quarter

- LU – 9:44 Coleman, Robert 35 yd run (Woodard, Ben kick),LU 0–7 Drive: 6 plays, 78 yards, 3:02

Second Quarter

- SLU – 14:07 Pierce, Coryell 50 yd interception,Tied 7–7
- LU – 2:20 Coleman, Robert 4 yd run (Woodard, Ben kick),LU 7–14 Drive: 12 plays, 74 yards, 6:37

Third Quarter

- LU – 9:00 Woodard, Ben 38 yd field goal,LU 7–17 Drive: 7 plays, 19 yards, 2:38
- SLU – 3:29 Martin Jr., Antonio 2 yd run (Callaghan, Riley kick),LU 14–17 Drive: 13 plays, 75 yards, 5:31
- SLU – 0:00 Lewis, Darius 18 yd pass from Sawyer, Eli (Callaghan, Riley kick),SLU 21–17 Drive: 5 plays, 34 yards, 2:34

Fourth Quarter

- LU – 1:18 Fuselier, Kyndon 34 yd pass from Longino, Jakolby (Woodard, Ben kick),LU 21–24 Drive: 9 plays, 62 yards, 4:33
- SLU – 0:00 Callaghan, Riley 37 yd field goal,Tied 24–24 Drive: 13 plays, 51 yards, 1:12

Overtime

- LU – 0:00 Woodard, Ben 30 yd field goal,LU 24–27 Drive: 6 plays, 12 yards, 0:00
- SLU – 0:00 Martin Jr., Antonio 4 yd run ( ),SLU 30–27 Drive: 3 plays, 25 yards, 0:00

Statistics	SELA	LAM
First downs	17	21
Total yards	73–593	70–354
Rushing yards	32–89	47–230
Passing yards	204	124
Passing: Comp–Att–Int	24–41–1	11–23–2
Time of possession	28:06	31:48

Team	Category	Player	Statistics
Southeastern Louisiana	Passing	Eli Sawyer	23/38, 208 yards, 1 TD, 1 INT
Southeastern Louisiana	Rushing	Antonio Martin, Jr.	18 carries, 62 yards, 2 TD
Southeastern Louisiana	Receiving	Darius Lewis	7 receptions, 93 yards, 1 TD
Lamar	Passing	Robert Coleman	9/19, 81 yards, 2 INT
Lamar	Rushing	Khalan Griffin	29 carries, 144 yards
Lamar	Receiving	Kyndon Fuselier	4 receptions, 70 yards, 1 TD

=== at No. 8 Incarnate Word ===
Game Ten – Lamar Cardinals (5–5; 2–3) at No. 8 Incarnate Word Cardinals (8–2; 5–0) - Game summary

Quarter	1	2	3	4	Total
Lamar	7	6	7	0	20
No. 8 Incarnate Word	10	10	14	7	41

at Gayle and Tom Benson Stadium, San Antonio, Texas

- Date: November 9
- Game time: 2:00 pm
- Game weather: Temperature: 78 • Wind: NE 6 mph • Weather: Sunny
- Game attendance: 2,055
- Referee: Gary Leeper
- TV announcers (ESPN+): Karl Schoening (play-by-play), Sam Kaman (analyst) & Blair Villarreal (sideline)

Game information

First Quarter

- UIW – 9:22 Brack Peacock 41 yard field goal,UIW 3–0 Drive: 9 plays, 59 yards, 3:37
- LU – 6:08 Devyn Gibbs 28 yard pass from Robert Coleman, Ben Woodard kick,LU 7–3 Drive: 7 plays, 75 yards, 3:14
- UIW – 5:10 Roy Alexander 37 yard pass from Zach Calzada, Brack Peacock kick,UIW 10–7 Drive: 3 plays, 75 yards, 0:58

Second Quarter

- UIW – 7:23 Roy Alexander 9 yard pass from Zach Calzada, Brack Peacock kick,UIW 17–7 Drive: 4 plays, 42 yards, 1:48
- LU – 0:52 Damien Moore 11 yard pass from Robert Coleman, PAT failed<,UIW 17–13 Drive: 3 plays, 14 yards, 1:00
- UIW – 0:00 Brack Peacock 36 yard field goalUIW 20–13 Drive: 8 plays, 71 yards, 0:48

Third Quarter

- UIW – 10:44 Jackson Lowe 6 yard pass from Zach Calzada, Brack Peacock kick,UIW 27–13 Drive: 12 plays, 75 yards, 4:16
- UIW – 9:25 Jalen Walthall 67 yard pass from Zach Calzada, Brack Peacock kick,UIW 34–13 Drive: 1 play, 67 yards, 0:09
- LU – 2:02 Izaha Jones 47 yard pass from Robert Coleman, Ben Woodard kick,UIW 34–20 Drive: 6 plays, 80 yards, 2:41

Fourth Quarter

- UIW – 7:39 Roy Alexander 56 yard pass from Zach Calzada, Brack Peacock kick,UIW 41–20 Drive: 5 plays, 80 yards, 2:29

Statistics	LAM	UIW
First downs	18	26
Total yards	61–330	72–606
Rushing yards	29–72	38–204
Passing yards	258	402
Passing: Comp–Att–Int	21–32–0	23–34–0
Time of possession	31:10	28:50

Team	Category	Player	Statistics
Lamar	Passing	Robert Coleman	17/22, 238 yards, 3 TD
Lamar	Rushing	Major Bowden	5 carries, 44 yards
Lamar	Receiving	Kyndon Fuselier	6 receptions, 90 yards
Incarnate Word	Passing	Zach Calzada	23/33, 402 yards, 5 TD
Incarnate Word	Rushing	Dekalon Taylor	15 carries, 98 yards
Incarnate Word	Receiving	Jalen Walthall	7 receptions, 165 yards, TD

=== Nicholls ===
Game Eleven – Nicholls Colonels (4–7; 2–4) at Lamar Cardinals (6–5; 3–3) - Game summary

Quarter	1	2	3	4	Total
Colonels	0	7	0	0	7
Cardinals	7	3	7	7	24

at Provost Umphrey Stadium, Beaumont, Texas

- Date: November 16
- Game time: 3:00 pm
- Game weather: Wind: SE 12mph • Weather: Cloudy • Temp: –
- Game attendance: 6,275
- Referee: James Brookhart
- TV: ESPN+
- Box score

Game information

First Quarter

- LU – 9:21 Fuselier, Kyndon 40 yd punt return (Woodard, Ben kick),LU 0–7, 2:26

Second Quarter

- LU – 5:57 Woodard, Ben 42 yd field goal,LU 0–10 Drive: 13 plays, 48 yards, 7:47
- NIC – 1:51 ufrene, Jackson 19 yd pass from McQuaide, Pat (Vallee, Ray kick),LU 7–10 Drive: 10 plays, 75 yards, 4:06

Third Quarter

- LU – 6:02 Griffin, Khalan 4 yd pass from Coleman, Robert (Woodard, Ben kick),LU 7–17 Drive: 7 play, 70 yards, 2:56

Fourth Quarter

- LU – 6:28 Gibbs, Devyn 13 yd pass from Coleman, Robert (Woodard, Ben kick),LU 7–24 Drive: 9 plays, 74 yards, 4:14

Statistics	NICH	LAM
First downs	16	17
Total yards	266	301
Rushing yards	68	150
Passing yards	198	151
Passing: Comp–Att–Int	21-34-3	12-21-2
Time of possession	28:32	31:28

Team	Category	Player	Statistics
Nicholls	Passing	Pat McQuaid	21-34-3, 198 yds, 1 TD
Nicholls	Rushing	Colin Guggenheim	7 carries, 22 yds
Nicholls	Receiving	Terry Matthews	7 receptions, 85 yds
Lamar	Passing	Robert Coleman	12-21-2, 151 yds, 2 TD
Lamar	Rushing	Khalan Griffin	21 carries, 89 yds
Lamar	Receiving	Kyndon Fuselier	3 receptions, 84 yds

=== at McNeese (Battle of the Border) ===
Game Twelve – Lamar Cardinals (7–5; 4–3) at McNeese Cowboys (6–6; 3–4) – Game summary

Quarter	1	2	3	4	Total
Cardinals	10	7	3	6	26
Cowboys	0	7	3	14	24

at Cowboy Stadium, Lake Charles, Louisiana

- Date: Saturday November 23, 2024
- Game time: 7:00 p.m.
- Game weather: Wind: SE 10mph • Weather: Clear • Temp: 55
- Game attendance: 7,244
- Referee: Edward Bourgeois
- TV: ESPN+
- Box score

Game information

First Quarter

- LU – 8:52 Carver, RJ 2 yd run (Woodard, Ben kick),LU 7–0 Drive: 4 plays, 58 yards, 2:26
- LU – 3:01 Woodard, Ben 35 yd field goal,LU 10–0 Drive: 10 plays, 40 yards, 3:54

Second Quarter

- LU – 6:10 Rhea, Sevonne 41 yd pass from Coleman, Robert (Woodard, Ben kick),LU 17–0 Drive: 5 plays, 73 yards, 2:18
- MCN – 2:47 Barbie, Joshon 1 yd run (Larco, Tyler kick),LU 17–7 Drive: 11 plays, 75 yards, 3:23

Third Quarter

- MCN – 6:14 Larco, Tyler 23 yd field goal,LU 17–10 Drive: 10 plays, 31 yards, 4:09
- LU – 2:30 Woodard, Ben 25 yd field goal,LU 20–10 Drive: 8 play, 40 yards, 3:37

Fourth Quarter

- MCN – 4:16 Carter, Jer'Michael 15 yd pass from Flores, Alex (Larco, Tyler kick),LU 20–17 Drive: 5 plays, 58 yards, 1:04
- MCN – 1:45 Lippold, Devin 3 yd run (Larco, Tyler kick),MCN 20–24 Drive: 6 plays, 32 yards, 2:14
- LU – 0:01 Fuselier, Kyndon 5 yd pass from Longino, Jakolby ( ),LU 26–24 Drive: 13 plays, 77 yards, 1:37

Statistics	LAM	MCN
First downs	24	22
Total yards	404	386
Rushing yards	247	130
Passing yards	157	256
Passing: Comp–Att–Int	12–26–0	24–34–0
Time of possession	27:43	32:16

Team	Category	Player	Statistics
Lamar	Passing	Robert Coleman	8/15, 100 yards, 1 TD
Lamar	Rushing	RJ Carver	22 carries, 122 yards, 1 TD
Lamar	Receiving	Kyndon Fuselier	5 receptions, 69 yards, 1 TD
McNeese	Passing	Alex Flores	24/34, 256 yards, 1 TD
McNeese	Rushing	Joshon Barbie	24 carries, 98 yards, 1 TD
McNeese	Receiving	Jer'Michael Carter	6 receptions, 77 yards, 1 TD

== Roster ==
2024 Lamar Cardinals football team roster
Players
Coaches
Offense

Pos.	#	Name	Class
RB	0	Xavier Coleman	Jr
WR	1	Andre Dennis	Jr
RB	2	Major Bowden	Jr
WR	3	Izaha Jones	Jr
WR	4	Cameron George	Jr
QB	5	Robert Coleman	Sr
RB	6	Khalin Griffin	Sr
WR	7	Sevonne Rhea	Jr
WR	8	Kyndon Fuselier	Jr
WR	9	Britain Simmons	Fr
QB	10	Jakolby Longino	Jr
QB	11	Brady Driver	Fr
QB	12	Lucas Powell	Fr
WR	13	Jayden Boyd	So
QB	14	Aiden McCown	Fr
QB	16	Kendric Malone	So
WR	17	Cash Cross	Fr
TE	18	Shaun Grayson	Jr
RB	24	R J Carver	Jr
RB	26	Dorian Manuel	Sr
RB	28	Damien Moore	Sr
TE	37	Mason Thomas	Fr
TE	48	Aidan Grummer	Fr
WR	49	Chad Turner	Sr
OL	51	Alex Haralson	Fr
OL	58	Elias Ripley	Sr
OL	60	John Hester	So
OL	61	Kade Verden	So
OL	62	Devin Fregia	Jr
OL	64	Bryce Loftin	Fr
OL	66	Kaleb Yount	Fr
OL	67	Marcus Harbert	So
OL	68	Reese Osei-Wusu	Fr
OL	69	Zachary Curtis	Fr
OL	70	Tyric Berg	Fr
OL	71	Jevale Roberson	Sr
OL	72	Endrei Sauls	Fr
OL	73	Kortez Winslow	Fr
OL	74	Knox Boyd	Jr
OL	75	B.J. Williams	Jr
OL	76	Thomas Le Boucher	Sr
OL	77	Reggie Burks	So
OL	78	Jude Locken	Fr
OL	79	Reggie Brooks	Jr
WR	80	Robert Hall	Fr
TE	81	Devyn Gibbs	Jr
TE	83	Iyioluwa Adekoya	Fr
TE	84	C J DeMas	Fr
TE	85	Kmare Balfour	Fr
TE	87	Tyler Bonkowski	Fr
TE	88	Morgan Sampson	Fr
TE	89	JaCorey Hyder	Jr

Defense

Pos.	#	Name	Class
LB	0	Jalen Freeman	Sr
DB	1	Kristian Pugh	Jr
DB	2	DeJuan Lewis	Jr
DB	3	Ramond Stevens	Sr
DE	4	Jaymond Jackson	Sr
DB	5	Damian Alexander	Sr
DB	6	Ronnie Hamrick	Jr
LB	7	Codey Martin	Jr
LB	8	Tah Mac Bright	Jr
DB	9	Jamarion Evans	Fr
LB	10	Hamilton Moore	Fr
DB	11	Anthony White	So
DB	12	Antorius Hambric, Jr.	Sr
DB	13	Nicholas Brown	Fr
DB	14	Dwight Davis	So
LB	15	Ken Savanah	Sr
DB	16	Jordan James	Fr
LB	17	Brayden Faulkner	Jr
DB	18	KJ Gilbert	Jr
DB	19	Edward Gilds	Jr
LB	20	Dillon Dickson	Fr
DB	21	Mar'Shawn Richardson-Giddings	Fr
DB	22	Jaden Harding	Jr
DB	23	Tre Turner	Fr
LB	27	Robert Bonar	Jr
DB	29	Jarrett Mitchell	Fr
DB	30	Du'Wayne Paulhill, Jr	Jr
DB	31	Brenden Bradshaw	Fr
DB	33	Samuel Scaife IV	Sr
LB	34	CJ Miller	Fr
DE	35	Royce Maloles	So
DB	36	Trace Holmes	So
LB	39	Etelridge McKinney	Fr
DB	40	Zaylon Stoker	Fr
LB	41	Nick Rossomando	Fr
DE	42	Jacob Ferree	So
DB	43	Avery Hughes	Jr
LB	44	Oliver Jack	Jr
DE	45	Kei'Trone Simpson	So
LB	46	Issac Blessing	Fr
DB	47	Javon Rhodes	Fr
DL	50	Iyiola Oluwa Solomi	Fr
LB	52	Jackson Bandy	Fr
LB	53	Daiki Yoshikawa	Fr
LB	55	Koda Canady	So
DL	57	Avery Yarbrough	Fr
DL	59	Javen Sanchez	Sr
LB	82	Zion Carter	Fr
DL	90	Grayden Spencer	Fr
DL	91	Alex Sumler	Fr
DL	92	Colin Hedges	So
DL	93	Daniel Obinna-Kanu	Fr
DL	95	Alexandre Dedieu	Jr
DL	96	Khai Mcghee	Fr
DL	97	Christian Booker	Jr
DL	98	Peyton Christian	So
DL	99	Caleb Williams	Sr

Special teams

Pos.	#	Name	Class
K/P	15	Chase Leon	Fr
K/P	32	Chris Esqueda	Sr
DS	54	Lane Gilchrist	Sr
K/P	94	Ben Woodard	Jr

Head coach

Pete Rossomando

Coordinators/assistant coaches

- Drew Christ, def coord
- Will Fleming, off coord and QBs
- Coby Gipson, recruiting coord and WRs
- Daryl Daleen, co-special teams coordinator and ILBs
- Wayne Cordova, Safeties
- Lorenzo Jackson, DLs
- Matt Cannata, OL
- Todd Macon, running backs
- Andrew Sparano, tight ends
- Morgan Ford, assistant coach
- Pat Walker, strength

Legend

- (C) Team captain
- (S) Suspended
- (I) Ineligible
- Injured
- Redshirt

Roster
Last update: August 13, 2024

== Conference awards and honors ==
Cardinal players received player of the week recognition four times during the season.

=== Weekly awards ===
Weekly honors
Honors	Player	Position	Date Awarded	Ref.
SLC Special Teams Player of the Week	Chase Leon	K/P	September 9, 2024	
SLC Defensive Player of the Week	DeJuan Lewis	DB	September 16, 2024	
SLC Special Teams Player of the Week	Ben Woodard	K/P	October 21, 2024	
SLC Offensive Player of the Week	Kyndon Fuselier	WR	November 18, 2024	

=== Postseason All–Southland Teams ===
The Southland Conference announced the 2024 all-conference football team selections on November 26, 2024. No Lamar players were named as first team members. Lamar had a total of 8 players including 6 offensive and 2 defensive selected as second team members.

Offense
2nd Team

- Khalan Griffin – Running back, SR
- Devyn Gibbs – Tight end, JR
- Kyndon Fuselier – Wide receiver, JR
- Elias Ripley – Offensive lineman, SR
- Jevale Roberson – Offensive lineman, SR
- Kortez Winslow – Offensive lineman, R–FR

Defense
2nd Team

- Caleb Williams – Defensive lineman, SR
- Kristian Pugh – Defensive back, JR
