= 2024 Stephen F. Austin Lumberjacks football team =

American college football season

2024 Stephen F. Austin Lumberjacks football
- Conference: Southland Conference
- Record: 7–5 (4–3 SLC)
- Head coach: Colby Carthel (6th season)
- Offensive coordinator: Chris Ross (1st season)
- Offensive scheme: Spread
- Defensive coordinator: Mike Mutz (2nd season)
- Base defense: 4–2–5
- Home stadium: Homer Bryce Stadium

2024 Southland Conference football standings
	Conf.			Overall
Team	W		L	W		L
No. 6 Incarnate Word $^	7	–	0	11	–	3
Southeastern Louisiana	6	–	1	7	–	5
Stephen F. Austin	4	–	3	7	–	5
Lamar	4	–	3	7	–	5
McNeese	3	–	4	6	–	6
Houston Christian	3	–	4	5	–	7
East Texas A&M*	2	–	4	3	–	9
Nicholls	2	–	5	4	–	8
Northwestern State	0	–	7	0	–	12
$ – Conference champion; ^ – FCS playoff participant; * – East Texas A&M was ineligible for FCS postseason play due to transition from NCAA Division II.; Rankings from STATS Poll

The 2024 Stephen F. Austin Lumberjacks football team represented Stephen F. Austin State University as a member of the Southland Conference (SLC) during the 2024 NCAA Division I FCS football season. The Lumberjacks were coached by sixth-year head coach Colby Carthel and played at Homer Bryce Stadium in Nacogdoches, Texas.

On May 29, 2024, Stephen F. Austin announced it would leave the United Athletic Conference (UAC) after accepting an invitation to join the Southland Conference as a full-time member effective July 1. Stephen F. Austin had previously left the Southland Conference in 2021 to join the Western Athletic Conference (WAC). The WAC and Atlantic Sun Conference (ASUN) officially merged their football leagues to form a football-only conference in 2022.

== Preseason ==
=== Preseason poll ===
The Southland Conference released their preseason poll on July 22, 2024. The Lumberjacks were picked to finish fifth in the conference.

=== Preseason All–Southland Teams ===
The Southland Conference announced the 2024 preseason all-conference football team selections on July 22, 2024. SFA had a total of two players selected.

Offense

2nd Team

- Kylon Harris – Wide receiver, JR

Defense

2nd Team

- Jeremiah Walker – Defensive back, SR

== Schedule ==
Date	Time	Opponent	Site	TV	Result	Attendance
August 29	7:00 pm	North American*	Homer Bryce Stadium; Nacogdoches, TX	ESPN+	W 77–0	2,014
September 7	6:30 pm	at North Texas*	DATCU Stadium; Denton, TX	ESPN+	L 20–35	23,510
September 14	7:00 pm	at McNeese	Cowboy Stadium; Lake Charles, LA	ESPN+	L 24–28	8,223
September 21	7:00 pm	Northern Colorado*	Homer Bryce Stadium; Nacogdoches, TX	ESPN+	W 48–7	7,683
October 5	7:00 pm	Northwestern State	Homer Bryce Stadium; Nacogdoches, TX (Chief Caddo)	ESPN+	W 59–17	5,793
October 12	3:00 pm	at No. 22 Lamar	Provost Umphrey Stadium; Beaumont, TX	ESPN+	W 27–20	8,368
October 19	4:00 pm	at Southeastern Louisiana	Strawberry Stadium; Hammond, LA	ESPN+	L 23–24	4,622
October 26	6:00 pm	Houston Christian^{†}	Homer Bryce Stadium; Nacogdoches, TX	ESPN+	W 55–6	6,246
November 2	3:00 pm	at Nicholls	Manning Field at John L. Guidry Stadium; Thibodaux, LA	ESPN+	W 28–12	5,676
November 9	3:30 pm	at East Texas A&M*	Ernest Hawkins Field at Memorial Stadium; Commerce, TX	ESPN+	L 14–19	3,652
November 16	2:00 pm	No. 6 Incarnate Word	Homer Bryce Stadium; Nacogdoches, TX	ESPN+	L 20–27	4,116
November 23	2:00 pm	No. 11 Abilene Christian*	Homer Bryce Stadium; Nacogdoches, TX	ESPN+	W 32–19	4,208
*Non-conference game; ^{†}Homecoming; Rankings from STATS Poll released prior to the game; All times are in Central time

== Game summaries ==
=== North American (NAIA) ===
North American Stallions (NAIA) (0–0) at Stephen F. Austin Lumberjacks (0–0) – Game summary

Quarter	1	2	3	4	Total
Stallions (NAIA)	0	0	0	0	0
Lumberjacks	42	28	0	7	77

at Homer Bryce Stadium, Nacogdoches, Texas

- Date: August 31
- Game time: 7:00 p.m. CDT
- Game weather: Sunny
- Game attendance: 2,014
- Referee: Andre Coleman
- TV: ESPN+
- Box score, Recap

Game information
First quarter
- SFA – Kylon Harris 53-yard pass from Sam Vidlak (Chris Campos kick), 14:23. Lumberjacks 7–0. Drive: 3 plays, 77 yards, 0:33.
- SFA – Rohan Fluellen 47-yard pass from Sam Vidlak (Chris Campos kick), 12:12. Lumberjacks 14–0. Drive: 2 plays, 61 yards, 0:27.
- SFA – Jordan Nabors 61-yard pass from Sam Vidlak (Chris Campos kick), 8:52. Lumberjacks 21–0. Drive: 2 plays, 72 yards, 0:28.
- SFA – Chris Taylor 15-yard pass from Sam Vidlak (Chris Campos kick), 5:46. Lumberjacks 28–0. Drive: 3 plays, 55 yards, 0:53.
- SFA – Blaine Green 50-yard pass from Sam Vidlak (Chris Campos kick), 3:32. Lumberjacks 35–0. Drive: 2 plays, 56 yards, 0:31.
- SFA – Jaylen Jenkins 10-yard run (Chris Campos kick), 1:09. Lumberjacks 42–0. Drive: 5 plays, 55 yards, 1:22.

Second quarter

- SFA – Gavin Rutherford 6-yard run (Chris Campos kick), 12:23. Lumberjacks 49–0. Drive: 7 plays, 68 yards, 2:10.
- SFA – Qualan Jones 28-yard run (Chris Campos kick), 9:00. Lumberjacks 56–0. Drive: 4 plays, 53 yards, 0:50.
- SFA – Ty Love 18-yard pass from Dalton McElyea (Chris Campos kick), 7:27. Lumberjacks 63–0. Drive: 1 play, 18 yards, 0:04.
- SFA – Jaylen Jenkins 2-yard run (Chris Campos kick), 0:51. Lumberjacks 70–0. Drive: 10 plays, 60 yards, 5:34.

Third quarter

- No scoring plays

Fourth quarter

- SFA – Dax Bridges 17-yard pass from Dalton McElyea (Chris Campos kick), 3:37. Lumberjacks 77–0. Drive: 8 plays, 60 yards, 5:03.

Statistics	NOAM	SFA
First downs	3	32
Plays–yards	41–40	51–675
Rushes–yards	19–(-5)	36–385
Passing yards	45	383
Passing: comp–att–int	11–22–1	14–15–0
Time of possession	29:41	30:19

Team	Category	Player	Statistics
North American	Passing	Jesper Korkalanien	7/11, 36 yards
North American	Rushing	Jesper Korkalanien	1 rush, 6 yards
North American	Receiving	Jordan Green	3 receptions, 15 yards
Stephen F. Austin	Passing	Sam Vidlak	8/8, 288 yards, 5 TD
Stephen F. Austin	Rushing	Qualan Jones	9 rushes, 121 yards, TD
Stephen F. Austin	Receiving	Kylon Harris	4 receptions, 115 yards, TD

The Lumberjacks jumped out to a 77–0 lead at halftime, scoring touchdowns on eleven consecutive drives. The third and fourth quarters were shortened to five minutes each.

=== at North Texas (FBS) ===
Stephen F. Austin Lumberjacks (1–0) at North Texas Mean Green (FBS) (1–0) – Game summary

Quarter	1	2	3	4	Total
Lumberjacks	10	7	3	0	20
Mean Green (FBS)	14	7	7	7	35

at DATCU Stadium, Denton, Texas

- Date: September 7
- Game time: 6:30 p.m. CDT
- Game weather: Sunny • Temperature: 83 °F (28 °C) • Wind: W 12mph
- Game attendance: 23,510
- Referee: Reid Jackson
- TV announcers (ESPN+): Peter Sousa and Doc Holliday
- Box score, Recap

Game information
First quarter
- SFA – Chris Campos 40-yard field goal, 11:26. Lumberjacks 3–0. Drive: 4 plays, -12 yards, 2:00.
- UNT – D. T. Sheffield 51-yard pass from Chandler Morris (Kali Nguma kick), 9:51. Mean Green 7–3. Drive: 5 plays, 75 yards, 1:35.
- UNT – D. T. Sheffield 2-yard pass from Chandler Morris (kali Nguma kick), 5:27. Mean Green 14–3. Drive: 10 plays, 81 yards, 3:23.
- SFA – Jermaine Brown 70-yard interception return (Chris Campos kick), 2:08. Mean Green 14–10.

Second quarter

- SFA – Isaiah Davis 33-yard pass from Sam Vidlak (Chris Campos kick), 9:50. Lumberjacks 17–14. Drive: 6 plays, 62 yards, 2:10.
- UNT – D. T. Sheffield 28-yard pass from Chandler Morris (Kali Nguma kick), 0:15. Mean Green 21–17. Drive: 4 plays, 44 yards, 1:34.

Third quarter

- UNT – Oscar Hammond 7-yard pass from Chandler Morris (Kali Nguma kick), 8:57. Mean Green 28–17. Drive: 10 plays, 74 yards, 4:04.
- SFA – Chris Campos 21-yard field goal, 6:47. Mean Green 28–20. Drive: 5 plays, 31 yards, 1:11.

Fourth quarter

- UNT – Damashja Harris 80-yard run (Kali Nguma kick), 14:16. Mean Green 35–20. Drive: 3 plays, 90 yards, 1:06.

Statistics	SFA	UNT
First downs	14	25
Plays–yards	70–248	77–504
Rushes–yards	31–67	33–182
Passing yards	181	322
Passing: comp–att–int	20–39–1	26–44–3
Time of possession	26:08	33:52

Team	Category	Player	Statistics
Stephen F. Austin	Passing	Sam Vidlak	20/39, 181 yards, TD, INT
Stephen F. Austin	Rushing	Jaylen Jenkins	12 rushes, 44 yards
Stephen F. Austin	Receiving	Kylon Harris	9 receptions, 74 yards
North Texas	Passing	Chandler Morris	26/44, 322 yards, 4 TD, 3 INT
North Texas	Rushing	Damashja Harris	10 rushes, 142 yards, TD
North Texas	Receiving	D. T. Sheffield	6 receptions, 74 yards, 3 TD

=== at McNeese ===
Game Three – Stephen F. Austin Lumberjacks (1–1; 0–0 SLC) vs McNeese Cowboys (1–2; 0–0) – Game summary

Quarter	1	2	3	4	Total
Lumberjacks	0	10	14	0	24
Cowboys	0	7	7	14	28

at Cowboy Stadium, Lake Charles, Louisiana

- Date: Saturday September 14
- Game time: 7:02 p.m.
- Game weather: Sunny • Temperature: 87 °F (31 °C) • Wind: SW at 9 miles per hour (14 km/h)
- Game attendance: 8,223
- Referee: James Brookhart
- TV announcers (ESPN+): Jeff Palermo (play-by-play) and Chaston Tavares (analyst)
- Box score, Recap

Game information

First quarter

No scoring plays

Second quarter

- (5:22) SFA – Chris Campos 31-yard field goal (Drive: 14 plays, 61 yards, 5:43; Stephen F. Austin 3–0)
- (3:04) SFA – Anthony Williams 33-yard pass from Sam Vidlak, Chris Campos kick (Drive: 1 play, 33 yards, 0:08; Stephen F. Austin 10–0)
- (0:00) MCN – Jihad Marks 54-yard pass from Clifton McDowell, Tyler Larco kick (Drive: 1 play, 54 yards, 0:03; Stephen F. Austin 10–7)

Third quarter

- (11:30) SFA – Blaine Green 24-yard pass from Sam Vidlak, Chris Campos kick (Drive: 9 plays, 75 yards, 3:30; Stephen F. Austin 17–7)
- (9:08) MCN – Jessie Campbell 23-yard pass from Clifton McDowell, Tyler Larco kick (Drive: 5 plays, 84 yards, 2:16; Stephen F. Austin 17–14)
- (4:37) SFA – Isaiah Davis 61-yard pass from Sam Vidlak, Chris Campos kick (Drive: 5 plays, 85 yards, 2:18; Stephen F. Austin 24–14)

Fourth quarter

- (8:03) MCN – Clifton McDowell 6-yard run, Tyler Larco kick (Drive: 12 plays, 75 yards, 5:00; Stephen F. Austin 24–21)
- (0:31) MCN – Clifton McDowell 11-yard run, Tyler Larco kick (Drive: 12 plays, 80 yards, 4:14; McNeese 28–24)

Statistics	SFA	MCN
First downs	24	19
Total yards	453	449
Rushing yards	212	136
Passing yards	241	313
Passing: Comp–Att–Int	18–28–1	18–29–0
Time of possession	29:51	30:09

Team	Category	Player	Statistics
Stephen F. Austin	Passing	Sam Vidlak	18/28, 241 yards, 3 TD, INT
Stephen F. Austin	Rushing	Qualan Jones	27 carries, 155 yards
Stephen F. Austin	Receiving	Isaiah Davis	3 receptions, 87 yards, TD
McNeese	Passing	Clifton McDowell	18/29, 313 yards, 2 TD
McNeese	Rushing	Coleby Hamm	8 carries, 45 yards
McNeese	Receiving	Jer'Michael Carter	5 receptions, 67 yards

=== Northern Colorado ===
Game Four – Northern Colorado Bears (0–3) at Stephen F. Austin Lumberjacks (1–2) – Game summary

Quarter	1	2	3	4	Total
Bears	0	0	7	0	7
Lumberjacks	14	21	7	6	48

at Homer Bryce Stadium, Nacogdoches, Texas

- Date: September 21
- Game time: 7:02 p.m. CDT
- Game weather: Sunny
- Game attendance: 7,683
- TV: ESPN+
- Box score, Recap

Game information

First Quarter

Second Quarter

Third Quarter

Fourth Quarter

Statistics	UNCO	SFA
First downs	12	26
Plays–yards	66–242	68–509
Rushes–yards	45–224	40–250
Passing yards	18	259
Passing: comp–att–int	13–21–0	18–28–0
Time of possession	33:34	26:26

Team	Category	Player	Statistics
Northern Colorado	Passing	Kia'i Keone	10/14, 20 yards
Northern Colorado	Rushing	Kia'i Keone	17 carries, 76 yards
Northern Colorado	Receiving	Brayden Munroe	3 receptions, 16 yards
Stephen F. Austin	Passing	Sam Vidlak	16/26, 219 yards, 3 TD
Stephen F. Austin	Rushing	Jaylen Jenkins	6 carries, 80 yards, 2 TD
Stephen F. Austin	Receiving	Blaine Green	5 receptions, 93 yards

=== Northwestern State (Chief Caddo) ===
Game Five – Northwestern State Demons (0–5; 0–0) at Stephen F. Austin Lumberjacks (2–2; 0–1) - Game summary

Quarter	1	2	3	4	Total
Demons	0	3	7	7	17
Lumberjacks	24	14	7	14	59

at Homer Bryce Stadium, Nacogdoches, Texas

- Date: October 5
- Game time: 7:02 p.m.
- Game weather: Sunny • Temperature: 86 °F (30 °C)
- Game attendance: 5,793
- Referee: Gary Leeper
- TV announcers (ESPN+): Chris Simmons (play-by-play) and Courtnee Garcia Jr. (analyst)
- Box score, Recap

Game information

First Quarter

- SFA – Blaine Green 6-yard pass from Sam Vidlak (Chris Campos kick), 12:52. Lumberjacks 7–0. Drive: 3 plays, 12 yards, 1:10.
- SFA – Kylon Harris 7-yard pass from Sam Vidlak (Chris Campos kick), 6:15. Lumberjacks 14–0. Drive: 10 plays, 86 yards, 4:23.
- SFA – Chris Campos 36-yard field goal, 3:33. Lumberjacks 17–0. Drive: 5 plays, 16 yards, 1:09.
- SFA – Qualan Jones 1-yard run (Chris Campos kick), 2:31. Lumberjacks 24–0. Drive: 3 plays, 20 yards, 0:50.

Second Quarter

- SFA – Qualan Jones 52-yard run (Chris Campos kick), 14:52. Lumberjacks 31–0. Drive: 4 plays, 78 yards, 0:56.
- NWST – Reed Honshtein 24-yard field goal, 10:25. Lumberjacks 31–3. Drive: 9 plays, 68 yards, 4:27.
- SFA – Jordan Nabors 29-yard pass from Sam Vidlak (Chris Campos kick), 9:04. Lumberjacks 38–3. Drive: 3 plays, 75 yards, 1:14.

Third Quarter

- SFA – Kylon Harris 9-yard pass from Sam Vidlak (Chris Campos kick), 12:07. Lumberjacks 45–3. Drive: 8 plays, 84 yards, 2:47.
- NWST – Myles Kitt-Denton 74-yard pass from J. T. Fayard (Reed Honshtein kick), 10:28. Lumberjacks 45–10. Drive: 3 plays, 75 yards, 1:39.

Fourth Quarter

- NWST – Matthew Broad 3-yard run (Reed Honshtein kick), 14:57. Lumberjacks 45–17. Drive: 3 plays, 67 yards, 0:58.
- SFA – Tyjuan Atkins 25-yard pass from Gavin Rutherford (Chris Campos kick), 10:40. Lumberjacks 52–17. Drive: 3 plays, 88 yards, 1:22.
- SFA – Kaidan Turner 58-yard fumble return (Chris Campos kick), 6:17. Lumberjacks 59–17.

Statistics	NWST	SFA
First downs	13	24
Plays–yards	61–379	70–623
Rushes–yards	29–49	34–256
Passing yards	330	367
Passing: comp–att–int	19–32–3	27–36–0
Time of possession	30:23	29:37

Team	Category	Player	Statistics
Northwestern State	Passing	J. T. Fayard	18/29, 322 yards, TD, 3 INT
Northwestern State	Rushing	Zay Davis	9 carries, 55 yards
Northwestern State	Receiving	Kenard King	3 receptions, 83 yards
Stephen F. Austin	Passing	Sam Vidlak	23/29, 307 yards, 4 TD
Stephen F. Austin	Rushing	Jaylen Jenkins	10 carries, 113 yards
Stephen F. Austin	Receiving	Blaine Green	4 receptions, 100 yards, TD

=== at No. 22 Lamar ===
Game Six – Stephen F. Austin Lumberjacks (3–2; 1–1) No. 22 Lamar Cardinals (3–2; 0–0) - Game summary

Quarter	1	2	3	4	Total
Lumberjacks	10	3	14	0	27
No. 22 Cardinals	0	7	6	7	20

at Provost Umphrey Stadium, Beaumont, Texas

- Date: October 12
- Game time: 3:02 pm
- Game weather: Sunny • Temperature: 87 °F (31 °C) • Wind: NE at 6 miles per hour (9.7 km/h)
- Game attendance: 8,368
- TV: ESPN+
- Box score, Recap

Game information

First Quarter

- SFA – 11:54 Harris, Kylon 36 yd pass from Vidlak, Sam (Campos, Chris kick) ,SFA 7–0 Drive: 5 plays, 74 yards, 2:06
- SFA – 4:46 Campos, Chris 31 yd field goal,SFA 10–0 Drive: 11 plays, 67 yards, 4:06

Second Quarter

- SFA – 12:30 Campos, Chris 25 yd field goal,SFA 13–0 Drive: 7 plays, 82 yards, 2:30
- LU – 7:07 Griffin, Khalan 2 yd run (Esqueda, Chris kick),SFA 13–7 Drive: 7 plays, 84 yards, 2:54

Third Quarter

- SFA – 9:34 Jones, Qualan 13 yd run (Campos, Chris kick),SFA 27–13 Drive: 11 plays, 57 yards, 5:20
- LU – 3:55 Rhea, Sevonne 80 yd pass from Coleman, Robert ( ),SFA 20–13 Drive: 1 play, 80 yards, 0:12
- SFA – 0:50 Jones, Qualan 10 yd run (Campos, Chris kick),SFA 27–13 Drive: 9 plays, 75 yards, 3:05

Fourth Quarter

- LU – 9:00 Longino, Jakolby 2 yd run (Esqueda, Chris kick),SFA 27–20 Drive: 12 plays, 75 yards, 6:50

Statistics	SFA	LAM
First downs	24	25
Plays–yards	64–443	78–456
Rushes–yards	27–114	36–162
Passing yards	329	294
Passing: comp–att–int	26–37–0	23–42–1
Time of possession	27:08	32:52

Team	Category	Player	Statistics
Stephen F. Austin	Passing	Sam Vidlak	26/37, 329 yards, TD
Stephen F. Austin	Rushing	Qualan Jones	21 carries, 119 yards, 2 TD
Stephen F. Austin	Receiving	Kylon Harris	10 receptions, 106 yards, TD
Lamar	Passing	Robert Coleman	22/41, 279 yards, TD, INT
Lamar	Rushing	Khalan Griffin	11 carries, 59 yards, TD
Lamar	Receiving	Sevonne Rhea	6 receptions, 166 yards, TD

=== at Southeastern Louisiana ===
Game Seven – Stephen F. Austin Lumberjacks (4–2; 2–1) at Southeastern Louisiana Lions (3–4; 2–0) – Game Summary

Quarter	1	2	3	4	Total
Lumberjacks	7	3	3	10	23
Lions	7	7	0	10	24

at Strawberry Stadium, Hammond, Louisiana

- Date: October 19
- Game time: 4:03 pm
- Game weather: Sunny • Temperature: 79 °F (26 °C) • Wind: E at 5 miles per hour (8.0 km/h)
- Game attendance: 4,622
- TV: ESPN+
- Box score, Recap

Game information

First Quarter

Second Quarter

Third Quarter

Fourth Quarter

Statistics	SFA	SELA
First downs	21	22
Plays–yards	66–337	68–348
Rushes–yards	28–93	33–114
Passing yards	244	234
Passing: comp–att–int	29–38–0	24–35–0
Time of possession	26:41	33:19

Team	Category	Player	Statistics
Stephen F. Austin	Passing	Sam Vidlak	29/38, 244 yards, 1 TD
Stephen F. Austin	Rushing	Jerrell Wimbley	11 carries, 83 yards
Stephen F. Austin	Receiving	Kylon Harris	13 receptions, 116 yards
Southeastern Louisiana	Passing	Eli Sawyer	24/35, 234 yards, 1 TD
Southeastern Louisiana	Rushing	Antonio Martin, Jr.	21 carries, 87yards, 1 TD
Southeastern Louisiana	Receiving	Darius Lewis	11 receptions, 96 yards, 1 TD

=== Houston Christian ===
Game Eight – Houston Christian Huskies (3–4; 1–1) at Stephen F. Austin Lumberjacks (4–3; 2–2) – Game Summary

Quarter	1	2	3	4	Total
Huskies	0	6	0	0	6
Lumberjacks	3	21	21	10	55

at Homer Bryce Stadium, Nacogdoches, Texas

- Date: October 26
- Game time: 6:02 p.m.
- Game weather: Sunny • Temperature: 83 °F (28 °C)
- Game attendance: 6,246
- TV announcers (ESPN+): Chris Simmons (play-by-play) and Courtnee Garcia Jr. (analyst)
- Box score, Recap

Game information

First Quarter

Second Quarter

Third Quarter

Fourth Quarter

Statistics	HCU	SFA
First downs	15	29
Plays–yards	68–208	67–561
Rushes–yards	38–82	38–231
Passing yards	126	330
Passing: comp–att–int	13–30–1	21–29–1
Time of possession	26:55	29:35

Team	Category	Player	Statistics
Houston Christian	Passing	Eli Brickhandler	4/12, 69 yards, INT
Houston Christian	Rushing	Eli Brickhandler	9 carries, 31 yards
Houston Christian	Receiving	Deuce McMillan	2 receptions, 47 yards
Stephen F. Austin	Passing	Sam Vidlak	20/27, 316 yards, 5 TD, INT
Stephen F. Austin	Rushing	Jaylen Jenkins	21 carries, 110 yards
Stephen F. Austin	Receiving	Jordan Nabors	3 receptions, 108 yards, TD

=== at Nicholls ===
Game Nine – Stephen F. Austin Lumberjacks (5–3; 3–2) at Nicholls Colonels (4–4; 2–1) – Game summary

Quarter	1	2	3	4	Total
Lumberjacks	0	21	7	0	28
Colonels	3	3	0	6	12

at Manning Field at John L. Guidry Stadium, Thibodaux, Louisiana

- Date: November 2
- Game time: 3:02 p.m.
- Game weather: Sunny
- Game attendance: 5,676
- TV: ESPN+
- Box score, Recap

Game information

First Quarter

Second Quarter

Third Quarter

Fourth Quarter

Statistics	SFA	NICH
First downs	11	23
Plays–yards	49–301	98–413
Rushes–yards	23–39	48–165
Passing yards	262	248
Passing: comp–att–int	14–26–1	27–50–3
Time of possession	17:57	42:03

Team	Category	Player	Statistics
Stephen F. Austin	Passing	Sam Vidlak	14/25, 262 yards, 4 TD, INT
Stephen F. Austin	Rushing	Jerrell Wimbley	8 carries, 47 yards
Stephen F. Austin	Receiving	Kylon Harris	6 receptions, 106 yards, 2 TD
Nicholls	Passing	Pat McQuaide	27/50, 248 yards, TD, 3 INT
Nicholls	Rushing	Collin Guggenheim	17 carries, 80 yards
Nicholls	Receiving	Miequle Brock	9 receptions, 89 yards

=== at East Texas A&M ===
NB: With East Texas A&M University having adopted its current name on November 7, 2024, this was East Texas A&M's first game under its new name.

Game Ten – Stephen F. Austin Lumberjacks (6–3; 4–2) at East Texas A&M Lions (1–8; 1–3) - Game summary

Quarter	1	2	3	4	Total
Lumberjacks	0	14	0	0	14
Lions	3	7	3	6	19

at Ernest Hawkins Field at Memorial Stadium, Commerce, Texas

- Date: November 9
- Game time: 3:30 pm
- Game weather: Weather: Sunny • Temp: 71 °F (22 °C)
- Game attendance: 3,652
- Referee: Craig Hesler
- TV: ESPN+
- Box score, Recap

Game information

First Quarter

- ETAM – Luke Jackson 21-yard field goal, 1:52. Lions 3–0. Drive: 9 plays, 56 yards, 3:49.

Second Quarter

- SFA – Qualan Jones 10-yard run (Chris Campos kick), 10:50. Lumberjacks 7–3. Drive: 15 plays, 75 yards, 6:02.
- SFA – Jerrell Wimbley 1-yard run (Chris Campos kick), 9:36. Lumberjacks 14–3. Drive: 4 plays, 18 yards, 1:09.
- ETAM – Tyson Schilling 28-yard pass from Ron Peace (Luke Jackson kick), 1:03. Lumberjacks 14–10. Drive: 8 plays, 94 yards, 2:36.

Third Quarter

- ETAM – Luke Jackson 32-yard field goal, 7:18. Lumberjacks 14–13. Drive: 6 plays, 40 yards, 1:23.

Fourth Quarter

- ETAM – Dayan Bilbo 5-yard pass from Ron Peace (pass failed), 11:45. Lions 19–14. Drive: 9 plays, 62 yards, 3:04.

Statistics	SFA	ETAM
First downs	22	17
Plays–yards	83–317	71–399
Rushes–yards	41–124	26–87
Passing yards	193	312
Passing: comp–att–int	26–42–0	22–45–0
Time of possession	32:45	27:45

Team	Category	Player	Statistics
Stephen F. Austin	Passing	Gavin Rutherford	26/41, 193 yards
Stephen F. Austin	Rushing	Qualan Jones	24 carries, 95 yards, TD
Stephen F. Austin	Receiving	Kylon Harris	12 receptions, 119 yards
East Texas A&M	Passing	Ron Peace	22/45, 312 yards, 2 TD
East Texas A&M	Rushing	Ron Peace	7 carries, 31 yards
East Texas A&M	Receiving	Jaden Proctor	4 receptions, 102 yards

=== No. 6 Incarnate Word ===
Game Eleven – No. 6 Incarnate Word Cardinals (8–2; 5–0) at Stephen F. Austin Lumberjacks (6–4; 4–2)

Quarter	1	2	3	4	Total
No. 6 Cardinals	3	10	7	7	27
Lumberjacks	6	3	3	8	20

at Homer Bryce Stadium, Nacogdoches, TX

- Date: November 16
- Game time: 2:03 p.m.
- Game weather: Sunny
- Game attendance: 4,116
- Referee: Craig Heslser
- TV announcers (ESPN+): Chris Simmons (play-by-play) & Courtney Garcia (analyst)
- Box score, Recap

Game information

First Quarter

- SFA – 10:41 Chris Campos 30 yard field goal
  SFA 3–0 Drive: 8 plays, 27 yards, 3:00
- UIW – 5:50 Brack Peacock 22 yard field goal
  Tied 3–3 Drive: 5 plays, 56 yards, 1:47
- SFA – 0:47 Chris Campos 23 yard field goal
  SFA 6–3 Drive: 9 plays, 38 yards, 1:30

Second Quarter

- UIW – 12:33 Brack Peacock 38 yard field goal
  Tied 6–6 Drive: 4 plays, 2 yards, 1:34
- UIW – 4:52 Dekalon Taylor 7 yard run, Brack Peacock kick
  UIW 13–6 Drive: 5 plays, 42 yards, 2:39
- SFA – 0:05 Chris Campos 31 yard field goal
  UIW 13–9 Drive: 12 plays, 66 yards, 4:42

Third Quarter

- UIW – 8:26 Roy Alexander 13 yard run, Brack Peacock kick
  UIW 20–9 Drive: 8 plays, 84 yards, 2:24
- SFA – 4:29 Chris Campos 36 yard field goal
  UIW 20–12 Drive: 11 plays, 56 yards, 3:57

Fourth Quarter

- UIW – 8:59 Roy Alexander 5 yard pass from Zach Calzada, Brack Peacock kick
  UIW 27–12 Drive: 6 plays, 64 yards, 2:59
- SFA – 6:56 Kylon Harris 25 yard pass from Gavin Rutherford, Gavin Rutherford rush
  UIW 27–20 Drive: 5 plays, 79 yards, 1:57

Statistics	UIW	SFA
First downs	16	21
Plays–yards	66–390	79–331
Rushes–yards	34–185	43–122
Passing yards	205	209
Passing: comp–att–int	15–32–3	21–36–2
Turnovers		
Time of possession	25:54	34:06

Team	Category	Player	Statistics
Incarnate Word	Passing	Zach Calzada	15/32, 205 yards, TD, 3 INT
Incarnate Word	Rushing	Dekalon Taylor	12 carries, 74 yards, TD
Incarnate Word	Receiving	Roy Alexander	6 receptions, 69 yards, TD
Stephen F. Austin	Passing	Gavin Rutherford	21/35, 209 yards, TD, 2 INT
Stephen F. Austin	Rushing	Gavin Rutherford	17 carries, 47 yards
Stephen F. Austin	Receiving	Kylon Harrs	6 receptions, 79 yards, TD

=== No. 11 Abilene Christian ===
Game Twelve – No. 11 Abilene Christian Wildcats (8–3) at Stephen F. Austin Lumberjacks (6–5) – Game Summary

Quarter	1	2	3	4	Total
No. 11 Wildcats	0	6	7	6	19
Lumberjacks	9	7	16	0	32

at Homer Bryce Stadium, Nacogdoches, Texas

- Date: November 23
- Game time: 2:00 p.m.
- Game weather: Sunny
- Referee: James Bookhart
- TV announcers (ESPN+): Chris Simmons (play-by-play) and Courtnee Garcia Jr. (analyst)
- Box score, Recap

Game information

First Quarter

- SFA – Lavar Lindo 8-yard pass from Gavin Rutherford (Chris Campos kick), 10:05. Lumberjacks 7–0. Drive: 3 plays, 12 yards, 0:43.
- SFA – Team safety, 0:16. Lumberjacks 9–0.

Second Quarter

- SFA – Kylon Harris 60-yard pass from Gavin Rutherford (Chris Campos kick), 11:04. Lumberjacks 16–0. Drive: 3 plays, 63 yards, 0:50.
- ACU – Jed Castles 9-yard pass from Maverick McIvor (pass failed), 4:42. Lumberjacks 16–6. Drive: 8 plays, 34 yards, 3:19.

Third Quarter

- SFA – Chris Campos 30-yard field goal, 13:52. Lumberjacks 19–6. Drive: 4 plays, 1 yard, 0:58.
- SFA – Qualan Jones 10-yard run (pass failed), 10:31. Lumberjacks 25–6. Drive: 3 plays, 90 yards, 0:41.
- SFA – Qualan Jones 1-yard run (Chris Campos kick), 5:06. Lumberjacks 32–6. Drive: 8 plays, 65 yards, 4:02.
- ACU – Nehemiah Martinez I 74-yard pass from Carson Haggard (Ritse Vaes kick), 4:17. Lumberjacks 32–13. Drive: 3 plays, 75 yards, 0:49.

Fourth Quarter

- ACU – Blayne Taylor 18-yard pass from Carson Haggard (pass failed), 9:53. Lumberjacks 32–19. Drive: 7 plays, 63 yards, 2:21.

Statistics	ACU	SFA
First downs	17	18
Plays–yards	70–293	71–384
Rushes–yards	23–35	41–124
Passing yards	258	260
Passing: comp–att–int	22–47–2	17–30–0
Time of possession	26:33	33:27

Team	Category	Player	Statistics
Abeline Christian	Passing	Carson Haggard	12/30, 187 yards, 2 TD, 2 INT
Abeline Christian	Rushing	Isaiah Johnson	5 carries, 30 yards
Abeline Christian	Receiving	Nehemiah Martinez I	6 receptions, 127 yards, TD
Stephen F. Austin	Passing	Gavin Rutherford	17/30, 260 yards, 2 TD
Stephen F. Austin	Rushing	Qualan Jones	17 carries, 62 yards, 2 TD
Stephen F. Austin	Receiving	Jordan Nabors	3 receptions, 104 yards
