= 2024 East Texas A&M Lions football team =

American college football season

2024 East Texas A&M Lions football
- Conference: Southland Conference
- Record: 3–9 (2–4 Southland)
- Head coach: Clint Dolezel (2nd season)
- Offensive scheme: Spread
- Defensive coordinator: Jack Tyler (1st season)
- Base defense: 4–2–5
- Home stadium: Ernest Hawkins Field at Memorial Stadium

2024 Southland Conference football standings
	Conf.			Overall
Team	W		L	W		L
No. 6 Incarnate Word $^	7	–	0	11	–	3
Southeastern Louisiana	6	–	1	7	–	5
Stephen F. Austin	4	–	3	7	–	5
Lamar	4	–	3	7	–	5
McNeese	3	–	4	6	–	6
Houston Christian	3	–	4	5	–	7
East Texas A&M*	2	–	4	3	–	9
Nicholls	2	–	5	4	–	8
Northwestern State	0	–	7	0	–	12
$ – Conference champion; ^ – FCS playoff participant; * – East Texas A&M was ineligible for FCS postseason play due to transition from NCAA Division II.; Rankings from STATS Poll

The 2024 East Texas A&M Lions football team represented East Texas A&M University as a member of the Southland Conference during the 2024 NCAA Division I FCS football season. The Lions were led by second-year head coach Clint Dolezel and played their home games at the Ernest Hawkins Field at Memorial Stadium in Commerce, Texas.

The team started the season as the Texas A&M–Commerce Lions, reflecting the school's former name of Texas A&M University–Commerce; the university officially changed its name on November 7, 2024.

This season marked East Texas A&M's third and final year of their transition from Division II to Division I. On June 23, 2025, the NCAA approved East Texas A&M's request for full Division I membership one year early, thus making them eligible for the playoffs beginning with the 2025—26 academic year.

== Preseason ==
=== Preseason poll ===
The Southland Conference released their preseason poll on July 22, 2024. The Lions were picked to finish eighth in the conference.

=== Preseason All–Southland Teams ===
The Southland Conference announced the 2024 preseason all-conference football team selections on July 22, 2024. TAMUC had a total of three players selected.

Offense

2nd Team

- Mitchell McGarry – Punter, RS-SR

Defense

1st Team

- Max Epps – Defensive back, RS-SR

2nd Team

- Jaden Rios – Defensive back, RS-JR

== Schedule ==
Date	Time	Opponent	Site	TV	Result	Attendance
August 31	7:00 p.m.	at San Diego State*	Snapdragon Stadium; San Diego, CA	TruTV	L 14–45	25,180
September 7	9:00 pm	at No. 18 UC Davis*	UC Davis Health Stadium; Davis, CA	ESPN+	L 22–36	8,743
September 14	6:00 pm	Grambling State*	Ernest Hawkins Field at Memorial Stadium; Commerce, TX	ESPN+	L 28–35 ^{OT}	5,944
September 21	6:00 pm	No. 11 Sacramento State*	Ernest Hawkins Field at Memorial Stadium; Commerce, TX	ESPN+	L 0–34	4,477
October 5	6:00 pm	at Southeastern Louisiana	Strawberry Stadium; Hammond, LA	ESPN+	L 9–21	3,758
October 12	2:00 pm	at Northwestern State	Harry Turpin Stadium; Natchitoches, LA	ESPN+	W 42–21	4,737
October 19	3:30 pm	Lamar^{†}	Ernest Hawkins Field at Memorial Stadium; Commerce, TX	ESPN+	L 20–29	5,437
October 26	2:00 pm	at Prairie View A&M*	Panther Stadium at Blackshear Field; Prairie View, TX	ESPN+	L 27–34	13,937
November 2	7:00 pm	at McNeese	Cowboys Stadium; Lake Charles, LA	ESPN+	L 3–31	8,584
November 9	3:30 pm	Stephen F. Austin*	Ernest Hawkins Field at Memorial Stadium; Commerce, TX	ESPN+	W 19–14	3,652
November 16	1:00 pm	Houston Christian	Ernest Hawkins Field at Memorial Stadium; Commerce, TX	ESPN+	W 41–40	2,354
November 23	1:00 pm	No. 6 Incarnate Word	Ernest Hawkins Field at Memorial Stadium; Commerce, TX	ESPN+	L 24–38	3,724
*Non-conference game; ^{†}Homecoming; Rankings from STATS Poll released prior to the game; All times are in Central time

== Game summaries ==
=== At San Diego State (FBS) ===
Texas A&M–Commerce Lions at San Diego State Aztecs (FBS) – Game summary

Quarter	1	2	3	4	Total
Lions	0	6	8	0	14
Aztecs (FBS)	3	0	21	21	45

at Snapdragon Stadium, San Diego, California

- Date: August 31
- Game time: 7:00 p.m. CDT/5:00 p.m. PDT
- Game weather: Sunny, 79 °F (26 °C)
- Game attendance: 25,180
- Referee: Patrick Foy
- TV announcers (TruTV): Ari Wolfe, Darius Walker, and Jared Greenberg
- Box score, Recap

Game information
First quarter
- SDSU – Gabriel Plascencia 50-yard field goal, 0:28. Aztecs 3–0. Drive: 16 plays, 48 yards, 5:27.

Second quarter

- AMC – E. J. Oakman 1-yard run (kick failed), 0:59. Lions 6–3. Drive: 10 plays, 75 yards, 4:08.

Third quarter

- SDSU – Marquez Cooper 47-yard run (Nick Lopez kick), 11:36. Aztecs 10–6. Drive: 6 plays, 66 yards, 1:54.
- SDSU – Tano Letuli 0-yard fumble return (kick failed), 10:47. Aztecs 16–6.
- SDSU – Louis Brown IV 44-yard pass from Danny O'Neil (Michael Harrison run), 6:35. Aztecs 24–6. Drive: 3 plays, 62 yards, 0:44.
- AMC – Drew Allison 6-yard pass from Eric Rodriguez (Eric Rodriguez pass to JaiSean McMillian), 2:17. Aztecs 24–14. Drive: 8 plays, 65 yards, 4:18.

Fourth quarter

- SDSU – Marquez Cooper 7-yard run (Nick Lopez kick), 14:55. Aztecs 31–14. Drive: 7 plays, 95 yards, 2:17.
- SDSU – J. D. Coffey III 45-yard interception return (Nick Lopez kick), 13:48. Aztecs 38–14.
- SDSU – Jordan Napier 8-yard pass from Danny O'Neil (Nick Lopez kick), 6:57. Aztecs 45–14. Drive: 7 plays, 79 yards, 4:28.

Statistics	TAMC	SDSU
First downs	17	23
Total yards	180	468
Rushing yards	63	254
Passing yards	117	214
Turnovers	3	0
Time of possession	31:28	28:32

Team	Category	Player	Statistics
Texas A&M–Commerce	Passing	Eric Rodriguez	14/20, 105 yards, TD, INT
Texas A&M–Commerce	Rushing	E. J. Oakman	8 rushes, 30 yards
Texas A&M–Commerce	Receiving	Dayan Bilbo	2 receptions, 35 yards
San Diego State	Passing	Danny O'Neil	22/33, 214 yards, 2 TD
San Diego State	Rushing	Marquez Cooper	27 rushes, 223 yards, TD
San Diego State	Receiving	Louis Brown IV	3 receptions, 91 yards, TD

=== At No. 18 UC Davis ===
Texas A&M–Commerce Lions at No. 18 UC Davis Aggies – Game summary

Quarter	1	2	3	4	Total
Lions	0	0	7	15	22
No. 18 Aggies	0	9	13	14	36

at UC Davis Health Stadium, Davis, California

- Date: September 7
- Game time: 9:00 p.m. CDT/7:00 p.m. PDT
- Game weather: Clear, 87 °F (31 °C)
- Game attendance: 8,743
- Referee: Robert Quello
- TV: ESPN+
- Box score, Recap

Game information
First quarter
- No scoring plays

Second quarter

- UCD – Hunter Ridley 28-yard field goal, 7:23. Aggies 3–0. Drive: 8 plays, 43 yards, 3:20.
- UCD – Hunter Ridley 32-yard field goal, 5:44. Aggies 6–0. Drive: 6 plays, 15 yards, 1:34.
- UCD – Hunter Ridley 29-yard field goal, 0:03. Aggies 9–0. Drive: 10 plays, 68 yards, 2:14.

Third quarter

- UCD – Chaz Davis 4-yard pass from Miles Hastings (pass failed), 12:07. Aggies 15–0. Drive: 7 plays, 75 yards, 2:53.
- UCD – Samuel Gbatu Jr. 54-yard pass from Miles Hastings (Hunter Ridley kick), 11:34. Aggies 22–0. Drive: 1 play, 54 yards, 0:08.
- AMC – Sean Sallis 32-yard pass from Ron Peace (Aidan Martin kick), 4:51. Aggies 22–7. Drive: 1 play, 47 yards, 0:22.

Fourth quarter

- UCD – Winston Williams 14-yard pass from Miles Hastings (Hunter Ridley kick), 9:02. Aggies 29–7. Drive: 8 plays, 76 yards, 3:57.
- AMC – E. J. Oakmon 61-yard pass from Ron Peace (Aidan Martin kick), 7:36. Aggies 29–14. Drive: 4 plays, 66 yards, 1:19.
- AMC – Brooks Rigney 17-yard pass from Ron Peace (Ron Peace pass to Sean Sallis), 5:03. Aggies 29–22. Drive: 8 plays, 68 yards, 1:45.
- UCD – David Meyer 60-yard interception return (Hunter Ridley kick), 0:46. Aggies 36–22.

Statistics	TAMC	UCD
First downs	23	22
Total yards	448	449
Rushing yards	-9	129
Passing yards	457	320
Turnovers	4	1
Time of possession	29:54	30:06

Team	Category	Player	Statistics
Texas A&M–Commerce	Passing	Ron Peace	29/56, 457 yards, 3 TD, 2 INT
Texas A&M–Commerce	Rushing	E. J. Oakmon	8 rushes, 14 yards
Texas A&M–Commerce	Receiving	Brooks Rigney	5 receptions, 88 yards, TD
UC Davis	Passing	Miles Hastings	26/39, 320 yards, 3 TD, INT
UC Davis	Rushing	Lan Larison	28 rushes, 123 yards
UC Davis	Receiving	C. J. Hutton	6 receptions, 84 yards

=== Grambling State ===
Grambling State Tigers at Texas A&M–Commerce Lions – Game summary

Quarter	1	2	3	4	OT	Total
Tigers	6	15	0	7	7	35
Lions	7	14	7	0	0	28

at Ernest Hawkins Field at Memorial Stadium, Commerce, Texas

- Date: September 14
- Game time: 6:00 p.m. CDT
- Game weather: Sunny, 91 °F (33 °C)
- Game attendance: 5,944
- Referee: Ed Bourgeois
- TV: ESPN+
- Box score, Recap

Game information
First quarter
- GRAM – Blake Davis 35-yard fumble return (kick blocked), 6:43. Tigers 6–0.
- AMC – B. K. Jackson 69-yard run (Luke Jackson kick), 6:02. Lions 7–6. Drive: 2 plays, 75 yards, 0:41.

Second quarter

- GRAM – Jacoby Bellazar 10-yard pass from Myles Crawley (Myles Crawley pass to Jacoby Bellazar), 12:56. Tigers 14–7. Drive: 3 plays, 17 yards, 1:15.
- AMC – B. K. Jackson 9-yard run (Luke Jackson kick), 7:27. Tied 14–14. Drive: 10 plays, 65 yards, 5:29.
- AMC – JaiSean McMillian 5-yard run (Luke Jackson kick), 4:41. Lions 21–14. Drive: 3 plays, 45 yards, 1:09.
- GRAM – Tre Bradford 41-yard run (Reed Harradine kick), 4:17. Tied 21–21. Drive: 1 play, 41 yards, 0:12.

Third quarter

- AMC – Braxton Garmon 3-yard run (Luke Jackson kick), 8:56. Lions 28–21. Drive: 7 plays, 44 yards, 4:03.

Fourth quarter

- GRAM – Nicholas Howard 27-yard pass from Myles Crawley (Reed Harradine kick), 1:18. Tied 28–28. Drive: 6 plays, 75 yards, 2:26.

Overtime

- GRAM – Tre Bradford 3-yard run (Reed Harradine kick). Tigers 35–28. Drive: 5 plays, 25 yards.

Statistics	GRAM	TAMC
First downs	13	19
Total yards	247	419
Rushing yards	117	267
Passing yards	130	152
Turnovers	3	6
Time of possession	25:45	34:15

Team	Category	Player	Statistics
Grambling State	Passing	Myles Crawley	14/30, 125 yards, 2 TD, 2 INT
Grambling State	Rushing	Tre Bradford	15 rushes, 70 yards, 2 TD
Grambling State	Receiving	Covadis Knighten	4 receptions, 29 yards
Texas A&M–Commerce	Passing	Ron Peace	14/28, 152 yards, 4 INT
Texas A&M–Commerce	Rushing	B. K. Jackson	16 rushes, 149 yards, 2 TD
Texas A&M–Commerce	Receiving	Christian Jourdain	4 receptions, 57 yards

=== No. 11 Sacramento State ===
No. 11 Sacramento State Hornets at Texas A&M–Commerce Lions – Game summary

Quarter	1	2	3	4	Total
No. 11 Hornets	3	17	14	0	34
Lions	0	0	0	0	0

at Ernest Hawkins Field at Memorial Stadium, Commerce, Texas

- Date: September 21
- Game time: 6:00 p.m. CDT
- Game weather: Sunny, 93 °F (34 °C)
- Game attendance: 4,477
- Referee: Austin Mezzacasa
- TV announcers (ESPN+): Greg Higgins (play-by-play) and Adam Routon (analyst)
- Box score, Recap

Game information
First quarter
- SAC – Zach Schreiner 37-yard field goal, 11:03. Hornets 3–0. Drive: 9 plays, 56 yards, 3:57.

Second quarter

- SAC – Zach Schreiner 34-yard field goal, 7:52. Hornets 6–0. Drive: 7 plays, 39 yards, 2:45.
- SAC – Elias Mullican 35-yard interception return (Zach Shreiner kick), 6:34. Hornets 13–0.
- SAC – Jared Gipson 22-yard pass from Carson Conklin (Zach Shreiner kick), 0:35. Hornets 20–0. Drive: 10 plays, 69 yards, 3:24.

Third quarter

- SAC – Elijah Tau-Tolliver 16-yard pass from Carson Conklin (Zach Schreiner kick), 10:46. Hornets 27–0. Drive: 5 plays, 27 yards, 2:21.
- SAC – Ezra Moleni 1-yard run (Zach Schreiner kick), 2:24. Hornets 34–0. Drive: 12 plays, 58 yards, 6:43.

Fourth quarter

- No scoring plays

Statistics	SAC	TAMC
First downs	20	9
Total yards	414	197
Rushing yards	260	26
Passing yards	154	171
Turnovers	2	4
Time of possession	38:04	21:56

Team	Category	Player	Statistics
Sacramento State	Passing	Carson Conklin	13/22, 154 yards, 2 TD
Sacramento State	Rushing	Elijah Tau-Tolliver	20 rushes, 127 yards
Sacramento State	Receiving	Jared Gipson	4 receptions, 85 yards, TD
Texas A&M–Commerce	Passing	Eric Rodriguez	8/16, 87 yards, 2 INT
Texas A&M–Commerce	Rushing	B. K. Jackson	9 rushes, 32 yards
Texas A&M–Commerce	Receiving	Tyler Daniels	2 receptions, 51 yards

=== At Southeastern Louisiana ===
Texas A&M–Commerce Lions at Southeastern Louisiana Lions

Quarter	1	2	3	4	Total
Texas A&M-Commerce	0	0	3	6	9
Southeastern Louisiana	0	7	7	7	21

at Strawberry Stadium, Hammond, Louisiana

- Date: October 5
- Game time: 6:00 p.m. CDT
- Game weather: Cloudy, 82 °F (28 °C)
- Game attendance: 3,758
- Referee: James Brookhart
- TV: ESPN+
- Box score, Recap

Game information
First quarter
- No scoring plays

Second quarter

- SELA – Antonio Martin Jr. 58-yard run (Braydon Nelson kick), 7:17. Southeastern Louisiana 7–0. Drive: 4 plays, 88 yards, 1:37.

Third quarter

- AMC – Luke Jackson 21-yard field goal, 9:25. Southeastern Louisiana 7–3. Drive: 11 plays, 61 yards, 5:35.
- SELA – Cade Collier 9-yard pass from Eli Sawyer (Braydon Nelson kick), 0:35. Southeastern Louisiana 14–3. Drive: 8 plays, 51 yards, 3:38.

Fourth quarter

- AMC – Tyler Daniels 8-yard pass from Ron Peace (run failed), 10:49. Southeastern Louisiana 14–9. Drive: 7 plays, 64 yards, 3:23.
- SELA – Antonio Martin Jr. 1-yard run (Braydon Nelson kick), 2:47. Southeastern Louisiana 21–9. Drive: 9 plays, 84 yards, 4:51.

Statistics	TAMC	SELA
First downs	15	21
Total yards	277	364
Rushing yards	62	170
Passing yards	215	194
Turnovers	2	1
Time of possession	30:21	29:39

Team	Category	Player	Statistics
Texas A&M–Commerce	Passing	Ron Peace	18/25, 161 yards, TD
Texas A&M–Commerce	Rushing	B. K. Jackson	10 rushes, 40 yards
Texas A&M–Commerce	Receiving	Christian Jourdain	8 receptions, 96 yards
Southeastern Louisiana	Passing	Eli Sawyer	17/31, 194 yards, TD, INT
Southeastern Louisiana	Rushing	Antonio Martin Jr.	27 rushes, 185 yards, 2 TD
Southeastern Louisiana	Receiving	Darius Lewis	8 receptions, 111 yards

=== At Northwestern State ===
Texas A&M–Commerce Lions at Northwestern State Demons – Game summary

Quarter	1	2	3	4	Total
Lions	14	7	14	7	42
Demons	7	0	0	14	21

at Harry Turpin Stadium, Natchitoches, Louisiana

- Date: October 12
- Game time: 2:00 p.m. CDT
- Game weather: Clear, 90 °F (32 °C)
- Game attendance: 4,737
- Referee: Ed Bourgeois
- TV announcers (ESPN+): Patrick Netherton (play-by-play) and Gary Reasons (analyst)
- Box score, Recap

Game information
First quarter
- NWST – Kennieth Lacy 5-yard run (Reed Honshtein kick), 12:21. Demons 7–0. Drive: 1 play, 5 yards, 0:03.
- AMC – Christian Jourdain 30-yard pass from Ron Peace (Luke Jackson kick), 9:21. Tied 7–7. Drive: 6 plays, 80 yards, 2:56.
- AMC – B. K. Jackson 1-yard run (Luke Jackson kick), 2:38. Lions 14–7. Drive: 10 plays, 54 yards, 4:31.

Second quarter

- AMC – Ron Peace 34-yard run (Luke Jackson kick), 1:16. Lions 21–7. Drive: 8 plays, 90 yards, 3:54.

Third quarter

- AMC – Christian Jourdain 22-yard pass from Ron Peace (Luke Jackson kick), 7:40. Lions 28–7. Drive: 5 plays, 75 yards, 2:03.
- AMC – Jordon Hamilton 22-yard pass from Ron Peace (Andy Gallegos kick), 1:54. Lions 35–7. Drive: 4 plays, 36 yards, 0:44.

Fourth quarter

- AMC – Leon Young 4-yard fumble return (Luke Jackson kick), 11:23. Lions 42–7.
- NWST – Kennieth Lacy 2-yard run (Reed Honshtein kick), 5:12. Lions 42–14. Drive: 10 plays, 87 yards, 6:10.
- NWST – Amaaz Eugene 27-yard pass from Abraham Johnston (Reed Honshtein kick), 0:16. Lions 42–21. Drive: 6 plays, 92 yards, 2:01.

Statistics	TAMC	NWST
First downs	21	16
Total yards	439	330
Rushing yards	159	29
Passing yards	280	301
Turnovers	2	3
Time of possession	30:01	29:59

Team	Category	Player	Statistics
Texas A&M–Commerce	Passing	Ron Peace	15/21, 275 yards, 3 TD
Texas A&M–Commerce	Rushing	B. K. Jackson	12 rushes, 62 yards, TD
Texas A&M–Commerce	Receiving	Christian Jourdain	3 receptions, 59 yards, 2 TD
Northwestern State	Passing	Abraham Johnston	14/22, 301 yards, TD, 2 INT
Northwestern State	Rushing	Kennieth Lacy	13 rushes, 43 yards, 2 TD
Northwestern State	Receiving	Amaaz Eugene	5 receptions, 96 yards, TD

=== Lamar ===
Lamar Cardinals at Texas A&M–Commerce Lions – Game summary

Quarter	1	2	3	4	Total
Cardinals	3	14	0	12	29
Lions	3	7	7	3	20

at Ernest Hawkins Field at Memorial Stadium, Commerce, Texas

- Date: October 19
- Game time: 3:30 p.m. CDT
- Game weather: Sunny, 78 °F (26 °C)
- Game attendance: 5,437
- Referee: Gary Leeper
- TV: ESPN+
- Box score, Recap

Game information
First quarter
- LAM – Ben Woodard 46-yard field goal, 10:07. Cardinals 3–0. Drive: 6 plays, 18 yards, 2:21.
- AMC – Luke Jackson 30-yard field goal, 5:14. Tied 3–3. Drive: 11 plays, 62 yards, 4:53.

Second quarter

- LAM – Robert Coleman 10-yard run (Ben Woodard kick), 13:00. Cardinals 10–3. Drive: 12 plays, 77 yards, 7:10.
- LAM – Devyn Gibbs 12-yard pass from Robert Coleman (Ben Woodard kick), 6:10. Cardinals 17–3. Drive: 11 plays, 80 yards, 5:07.
- AMC – Christian Jourdain 9-yard pass from Ron Peace (Luke Jackson kick), 0:50. Cardinals 17–10. Drive: 11 plays, 66 yards, 2:10.

Third quarter

- AMC – Jaden Proctor 6-yard pass from Ron Peace (Luke Jackson kick), 4:21. Tied 17–17. Drive: 3 plays, 46 yards, 1:10.

Fourth quarter

- LAM – Ben Woodard 37-yard field goal, 6:13. Cardinals 20–17. Drive: 10 plays, 29 yards, 4:36.
- AMC – Luke Jackson 52-yard field goal, 1:55. Tied 20–20. Drive: 10 plays, 40 yards, 4:18.
- LAM – Ben Woodard 51-yard field goal, 0:11. Cardinals 23–20. Drive: 9 plays, 36 yards, 1:38.
- LAM – Jaymond Jackson 2-yard fumble return, 0:00. Cardinals 29–20.

Statistics	LAM	TAMC
First downs	23	17
Total yards	388	269
Rushing yards	262	27
Passing yards	126	242
Turnovers	1	2
Time of possession	33:28	26:32

Team	Category	Player	Statistics
Lamar	Passing	Robert Coleman	12/26, 98 yards, TD
Lamar	Rushing	Khalan Griffin	23 rushes, 158 yards
Lamar	Receiving	Devyn Gibbs	4 receptions, 39 yards, TD
Texas A&M–Commerce	Passing	Ron Peace	22/38, 237 yards, 2 TD, INT
Texas A&M–Commerce	Rushing	K. J. Shankle	6 rushes, 15 yards
Texas A&M–Commerce	Receiving	Christian Jourdain	8 receptions, 136 yards, TD

=== At Prairie View A&M ===
Texas A&M–Commerce Lions at Prairie View A&M Panthers – Game summary

Quarter	1	2	Total
Lions			0
Panthers			0

at Panther Stadium, Prairie View, Texas

- Date: October 26
- Game time: 2:00 p.m. CDT
- TV: ESPN+

Statistics	TAMC	PV
First downs		
Total yards		
Rushing yards		
Passing yards		
Turnovers		
Time of possession		

Team	Category	Player	Statistics
Texas A&M–Commerce	Passing		
Texas A&M–Commerce	Rushing		
Texas A&M–Commerce	Receiving		
Prairie View A&M	Passing		
Prairie View A&M	Rushing		
Prairie View A&M	Receiving		

=== At McNeese ===
Texas A&M-Commerce Lions at McNeese Cowboys – Game summary

Quarter	1	2	3	4	Total
Lions	0	0	0	0	0
Cowboys	0	0	0	0	0

at Cowboy Stadium, Lake Charles, Louisiana

- Date: November 2
- Game time: 7:00 p.m. CDT
- TV: ESPN+

Statistics	TAMC	MCN
First downs		
Total yards		
Rushing yards		
Passing yards		
Turnovers		
Time of possession		

Team	Category	Player	Statistics
Texas A&M–Commerce	Passing		
Texas A&M–Commerce	Rushing		
Texas A&M–Commerce	Receiving		
McNeese	Passing		
McNeese	Rushing		
McNeese	Receiving		

=== Stephen F. Austin ===
Stephen F. Austin Lumberjacks at East Texas A&M Lions - Game summary

Quarter	1	2	3	4	Total
Lumberjacks	0	14	0	0	14
Lions	3	7	3	6	19

at Ernest Hawkins Field at Memorial Stadium, Commerce, Texas

- Date: November 9
- Game time: 3:30 p.m. CST
- Game weather: Sunny, 71 °F (22 °C)
- Game attendance: 3,652
- Referee: Craig Hesler
- TV: ESPN+
- Box score, Recap

Game information
First quarter
- ETAM – Luke Jackson 21-yard field goal, 1:52. Lions 3–0. Drive: 9 plays, 56 yards, 3:49.

Second quarter

- SFA – Qualan Jones 10-yard run (Chris Campos kick), 10:50. Lumberjacks 7–3. Drive: 15 plays, 75 yards, 6:02.
- SFA – Jerrell Wimbley 1-yard run (Chris Campos kick), 9:36. Lumberjacks 14–3. Drive: 4 plays, 18 yards, 1:09.
- ETAM – Tyson Schilling 28-yard pass from Ron Peace (Luke Jackson kick), 1:03. Lumberjacks 14–10. Drive: 8 plays, 94 yards, 2:36.

Third quarter

- ETAM – Luke Jackson 32-yard field goal, 7:18. Lumberjacks 14–13. Drive: 6 plays, 40 yards, 1:23.

Fourth quarter

- ETAM – Dayan Bilbo 5-yard pass from Ron Peace (pass failed), 11:45. Lions 19–14. Drive: 9 plays, 62 yards, 3:04.

Statistics	SFA	ETAM
First downs	22	17
Total yards	317	399
Rushing yards	124	87
Passing yards	193	312
Turnovers	1	3
Time of possession	32:45	27:15

Team	Category	Player	Statistics
Stephen F. Austin	Passing	Gavin Rutherford	26/41, 193 yards
Stephen F. Austin	Rushing	Qualan Jones	24 rushes, 95 yards, TD
Stephen F. Austin	Receiving	Kylon Harris	12 receptions, 119 yards
East Texas A&M	Passing	Ron Peace	22/45, 312 yards, 2 TD
East Texas A&M	Rushing	Ron Peace	7 rushes, 31 yards
East Texas A&M	Receiving	Jaden Proctor	4 receptions, 102 yards

=== Houston Christian ===
Houston Christian Huskies at East Texas A&M Lions – Game summary

Quarter	1	2	3	4	Total
Huskies	7	7	26	0	40
Lions	14	7	14	6	41

at Ernest Hawkins Field at Memorial Stadium, Commerce, Texas

- Date: November 16
- Game time: 1:00 p.m. CST
- Game weather: Cloudy, 70 °F (21 °C)
- Game attendance: 2,354
- Referee: Ed Bourgeois
- TV announcers (ESPN+): Greg Higgins and Adam Routon
- Box score, Recap

Game information
First quarter
- HCU – Semaj Brown 36-yard interception return (Dillon Fedor kick), 7:28. Huskies 7–0.
- ETAM – B. K. Jackson 1-yard run (Luke Jackson kick), 3:24. Tied 7–7. Drive: 5 plays, 35 yards, 1:50.
- ETAM – Max Epps 55-yard interception return (Luke Jackson kick), 1:02. Lions 14–7.

Second quarter

- ETAM – Christian Jourdain 20-yard pass from Ron Peace (Luke Jackson kick), 7:48. Lions 21–7. Drive: 11 plays, 85 yards, 5:14.
- HCU – A. J. Wilson 45-yard pass from Cutter Stewart (Dillon Fedor kick), 3:03. Lions 21–14. Drive: 4 plays, 58 yards, 1:11.

Third quarter

- HCU – Dillon Fedor 36-yard field goal, 13:29. Lions 21–17. Drive: 4 plays, 5 yards, 1:21.
- HCU – Dillon Fedor 29-yard field goal, 8:55. Lions 21–20. Drive: 7 plays, 52 yards, 3:16.
- HCU – A. J. Wilson 67-yard pass from Cutter Stewart (pass failed), 7:22. Huskies 26–21. Drive: 2 plays, 65 yards, 0:41.
- HCU – A. J. Wilson 75-yard pass from Cutter Stewart (Dillon Fedor kick), 4:59. Huskies 33–21. Drive: 1 play, 75 yards, 0:17.
- ETAM – Christian Jourdain 15-yard pass from Ron Peace (Luke Jackson kick), 3:14. Huskies 33–28. Drive: 5 plays, 75 yards, 1:45.
- HCU – Champ Dozier 97-yard kickoff return (Dillon Fedor kick), 3:01. Huskies 40–28.
- ETAM – Christian Jourdain 17-yard pass from Ron Peace (Luke Jackson kick), 0:25. Huskies 40–35. Drive: 7 plays, 74 yards, 2:30.

Fourth quarter

- ETAM – Sean Sallis 2-yard pass from Ron Peace (pass failed), 0:36. Lions 41–40. Drive: 10 plays, 56 yards, 1:37.

Statistics	HCU	ETAM
First downs	17	31
Total yards	425	488
Rushing yards	115	88
Passing yards	310	400
Turnovers	3	2
Time of possession	26:03	33:57

Team	Category	Player	Statistics
Houston Christian	Passing	Cutter Stewart	15/30, 310 yards, 3 TD, INT
Houston Christian	Rushing	Jesse Valenzuela	11 rushes, 51 yards
Houston Christian	Receiving	A. J. Wilson	4 receptions, 206 yards, 2 TD
East Texas A&M	Passing	Ron Peace	40/65, 400 yards, 4 TD, 2 INT
East Texas A&M	Rushing	K. J. Shankle	13 rushes, 59 yards
East Texas A&M	Receiving	Christian Jourdain	6 receptions, 105 yards, 3 TD

=== No. 6 Incarnate Word ===
No. 6 Incarnate Word Cardinals at East Texas A&M Lions – Game summary

Quarter	1	2	3	4	Total
No. 6 Cardinals	7	10	0	21	38
Lions	7	10	7	0	24

at Ernest Hawkins Field at Memorial Stadium, Commerce, Texas

- Date: November 23
- Game time: 1:00 p.m. CST
- Game weather: Sunny, 69 °F (21 °C)
- Game attendance: 3,724
- Referee: Austin Mezzacasa
- TV announcers (ESPN+): Greg Higgins and Adam Routon
- Box score, Recap

Statistics	UIW	ETAM
First downs		
Total yards		
Rushing yards		
Passing yards		
Turnovers		
Time of possession		

Team	Category	Player	Statistics
Incarnate Word	Passing		
Incarnate Word	Rushing		
Incarnate Word	Receiving		
East Texas A&M	Passing		
East Texas A&M	Rushing		
East Texas A&M	Receiving		
