= 2024 Nicholls Colonels football team =

American college football season

2024 Nicholls Colonels football
- Conference: Southland Conference
- Record: 4–8 (2–5 Southland)
- Head coach: Tommy Rybacki (2nd season)
- Offensive coordinator: Matt Giampa (1st season)
- Defensive coordinator: Darion Monroe (2nd season)
- Home stadium: Manning Field at John L. Guidry Stadium

2024 Southland Conference football standings
	Conf.			Overall
Team	W		L	W		L
No. 6 Incarnate Word $^	7	–	0	11	–	3
Southeastern Louisiana	6	–	1	7	–	5
Stephen F. Austin	4	–	3	7	–	5
Lamar	4	–	3	7	–	5
McNeese	3	–	4	6	–	6
Houston Christian	3	–	4	5	–	7
East Texas A&M*	2	–	4	3	–	9
Nicholls	2	–	5	4	–	8
Northwestern State	0	–	7	0	–	12
$ – Conference champion; ^ – FCS playoff participant; * – East Texas A&M was ineligible for FCS postseason play due to transition from NCAA Division II.; Rankings from STATS Poll

The 2024 Nicholls Colonels football team represented Nicholls State University in the 2024 NCAA Division I FCS football season. The Colonels played their home games at Manning Field at John L. Guidry Stadium in Thibodaux, Louisiana, and competed in the Southland Conference. They were led by tenth–year head coach Tim Rebowe.

On December 1, head coach Tim Rebowe announced that he was retiring, finishing at Nicholls with an overall record of 57–56 through ten seasons. Defensive coordinator Tommy Rybacki was named the Colonels' new head coach.

== Preseason ==
=== Preseason poll ===
The Southland Conference released their preseason poll on July 22, 2024. The Colonels were picked to finish first in the conference and received nine first-place votes.

=== Preseason All–Southland Teams ===
The Southland Conference announced the 2024 preseason all-conference football team selections on July 22, 2024. Nicholls had a total of 15 players selected.

Offense

1st Team

- Jaylon Spears – Running back, RS-SO
- Collin Guggenheim – Running back, JR
- Lee Negrotto – Tight end/halfback, JR
- Quincy Brown – Wide receiver, JR
- Evan Roussel – Offensive lineman, JR
- Kylan Dupre – Punter, SO

2nd Team

- Pat McQuaide – Quarterback, JR
- Reed Lambert – Offensive lineman, JR

Defense

1st Team

- Rasheed Lovelace – Defensive lineman, RS-FR
- Kershawn Fisher – Defensive lineman, SR
- Joe Mason – Defensive lineman, SR
- Hayden Shaheen – Linebacker, RS-SO
- Tyler Mouton – Defensive back, JR
- Kendarius Smith – Defensive back, SR

2nd Team

- Eli Ennis – Linebacker, SO

== Personnel ==
2024 Nicholls Colonels football team roster
Players
Coaches
Offense

Pos.	#	Name	Class
RB	0	Jaylon Spears	Jr
WR	1	Terry Matthews	Sr
RB	4	Marquese Albert	Sr
QB	7	Pat McQuaide	Jr
WR	8	Quincy Brown	Jr
TE	9	Lee Negrotto	Sr
QB	11	Ean Rodrigue	Fr
QB	12	Jakob Foss	Jr
WR	14	Dany'e Brooks	Jr
QB	15	Preston Welch	Fr
QB	16	Christian Arceneaux	So
WR	17	Tank McMath	Jr
RB	19	Collin Guggenheim	Sr
RB	22	Miequle Brock	Fr
WR	23	Jason Barnes Jr.	So
RB	24	Shane Lee	Fr
WR	27	Gil Chapman	Fr
RB	30	Corey Warren Jr.	Jr
RB	32	Jayden Milton	Fr
WR	33	Kyler Paul	So
WR	34	Brian McQuaide	Fr
RB	37	Tye Smith-Lindsey	GS
RB	38	Jeffrey Diedrich	Fr
WR	39	Brailon Raymond	Fr
TE	40	Cohen Barrilleaux	So
WR	41	Reece Turner	Fr
TE	43	Nathan Hebb	Sr
TE	45	Noah Onyia	Fr
TE	48	Scott White	Fr
OL	54	Aaron Ponson	Fr
OL	56	Justin Howard	Fr
OL	59	Jacob Carpenter	Fr
OL	60	Jordan Aaron	Sr
OL	61	Reed Lambert	Sr
OL	62	Seth Trahan	Jr
OL	63	Hamza Rahman	Fr
OL	66	Sameij Scott	So
OL	67	Marcus Garcia	Fr
OL	68	Robbie Pizzolato	So
OL	69	Joseph Bradford	Jr
OL	70	Jacob Johnson	Fr
OL	71	Evan Roussel	Sr
OL	72	Seth Doran	Fr
OL	73	Kelvin Gray	Fr
OL	74	DeAndre’ Keller	Jr
OL	75	Enzo Marino	Fr
OL	76	Ryan Bernard	So
OL	77	Cam Banks	So
OL	78	Jaden Ben	Sr
OL	79	Cru Blanchard	Jr
WR	80	Scrappy Osby	So
TE	81	Treylin Whaley	So
WR	82	Jackson Dufrene	Fr
WR	83	Karaaz Johnson	Fr
WR	84	Paxton Lafont	Fr
WR	85	Christian McNees	Fr
WR	86	Camare Hampton	Fr
TE	88	Connor Venetis	Sr
TE	89	Logan Wilcox	Sr

Defense

Pos.	#	Name	Class
DB	2	Tyler Morton	Sr
DB	3	Laurence Sullivan Jr.	Jr
DB	5	Kendarius Smith	Sr
DB	6	Ty Marsh	Jr
LB	7	Jake Dalmado	Jr
LB	10	Hayden Shaheen	Jr
LB	11	Quinton Sharkey	Sr
LB	13	Kylin White	Jr
DB	18	Markeyvrick Eddie	Sr
LB	20	Kershawn Fisher	Sr
DB	21	Malik Woodery	Jr
DB	22	Anthony Rogers	Fr
DB	24	Nick Jacobs	Fr
DB	26	Keontae Williams	Jr
DB	28	Marcus Dawson	Fr
DB	29	Jamison Lindsey	Sr
LB	30	Taylor Thibodaux	Fr
DB	31	Korwin Scott Jr.	Fr
DB	33	Shermar Carter	Fr
DB	35	Ethan Lee	Jr
DB	36	Justin Helper	Fr
DB	37	Hunter Addison	Fr
DB	39	Tasmin Showers	Fr
LB	41	Dominic Logiudice	So
LB	42	David Cresson	Jr
LB	43	Trent Santos	Fr
LB	44	Eli Ennis	Jr
DL	45	Alex Villavaso	Jr
DB	46	Josh Wax	So
DB	47	Destin Refuge	Jr
LB	49	Darrel Gibson	Fr
LB	50	Keidrick Richardson	Fr
DL	51	Joe Mason	Sr
LB	52	Andrew Cavalier	Fr
LB	52	Kaiden Jones	So
LB	53	Jake Newchurch	So
DL	54	Marcus Dickey	So
DL	56	Rasheed Lovelace	So
LB	57	Hayden Cormier	So
LB	58	Arrington Adams	Fr
LB	60	Aiden Cain	Fr
DL	65	Christian Mannino	Jr
DL	90	Aidan Clements	Fr
DL	91	Zack Bernard	Sr
DL	92	Josh Johnson	Fr
DL	93	Talan Bingham	Fr
DL	94	Nick Williams	So
DL	95	Dillion Davis	Sr
DL	98	Dale Smith	Fr
DL	99	JaQuan Fank	So

Special teams

Pos.	#	Name	Class
LS	25	Elijah Reames	Sr
K/P	34	Ray Vallee	Sr
K	36	Gabe Showalter	Jr
K/P	38	Kylan Dupre	Jr
LS	49	Josh Bellanger	Fr
LS	50	Jackson McFarland	Jr
LS	53	Craig Roth	Fr

Head coach

- Tim Rebowe (LSU)

Coordinators/assistant coaches

- Rob Christophel (Austin Peay State)
  Offensive coordinator/qb
- Tommy Rybacki (Jacksonville State)
  Defensive coordinator
- Tylan Martin (Jacksonville State)
  Running backs
- Darion Monroe (Tulane)
  Secondary
- Sean Murphy (Millsaps College)
  Wide receivers
- Andrew Neupert (LSU New Orleans)
  Tight ends
- P.J. Burkhalter (Nicholls State)
  Offensive line
- Glen Thurmond (Nicholls State)
  Assistant defensive line
- Rob Snyder (LSU)
  Defensive line

Legend

- (C) Team captain
- (S) Suspended
- (I) Ineligible
- Injured
- Redshirt

Roster

== Schedule ==
Date	Time	Opponent	Rank	Site	TV	Result	Attendance
August 31	7:00 pm	at Louisiana Tech*	No. 23	Joe Aillet Stadium; Ruston, LA	ESPN+	L 17–25	16,570
September 7	6:30 pm	at No. 18 (FBS) LSU*	No. 22	Tiger Stadium; Baton Rouge, LA	SECN+/ESPN+	L 21–44	100,242
September 14	8:00 pm	at No. 11 Sacramento State*	No. 24	Hornet Stadium; Sacramento, CA	ESPN+	L 7–34	12,494
September 21	3:00 pm	Mississippi Valley State*		Manning Field at John L. Guidry Stadium; Thibodaux, LA	ESPN+	W 66–0	4,828
October 5	6:00 pm	at Southern*		A. W. Mumford Stadium; Baton Rouge, LA		W 51–7	17,179
October 12	6:00 pm	at No. 15 Incarnate Word		Gayle and Tom Benson Stadium; San Antonio, TX	ESPN+	L 10–55	1,801
October 19	11:00 am	Northwestern State		Manning Field at John L. Guidry Stadium; Thibodaux, LA (NSU Challenge)	ESPN+	W 20–0	5,494
October 26	3:00 pm	McNeese^{†}		Manning Field at John L. Guidry Stadium; Thibodaux, LA	ESPN+	W 24–19	6,593
November 2	3:00 pm	Stephen F. Austin		Manning Field at John L. Guidry Stadium; Thibodaux, LA	ESPN+	L 12–28	5,676
November 9	2:00 pm	at Houston Christian		Husky Stadium; Houston, TX	ESPN+	L 21–24	2,081
November 16	3:00 pm	at Lamar		Provost Umphrey Stadium; Beaumont, TX	ESPN+	L 7–24	6,275
November 21	6:00 pm	Southeastern Louisiana		Manning Field at John L. Guidry Stadium; Thibodaux, LA (River Bell Classic)	ESPN+	L 16–19	6,955
*Non-conference game; ^{†}Homecoming; Rankings from STATS Poll released prior to the game; All times are in Central time

== Game summaries ==
=== at Louisiana Tech (FBS) ===
Game One – No. 23 Nicholls Colonels at Louisiana Tech Bulldogs (FBS)

Quarter	1	2	3	4	Total
No. 23 Colonels	7	3	0	7	17
Bulldogs (FBS)	9	6	0	10	25

at Joe Aillet Stadium, Ruston, Louisiana

- Date: August 31
- Game time: 7:00 pm
- Game weather: Wind: • Weather: Cloudy • Temp: 79 °F (26 °C)
- Game attendance: 16,570
- Referee: Scott Hardin
- TV announcers (ESPN+): Chris Mycoskie (play-by-play), Shea Walker (analyst), and Madison Kaufman (sideline)

Game information

First Quarter

- LT – Jaylon Spears tackled in own end zone, 12:55. Bulldogs 2–0.
- NICH – Rasheed Lovelace 25-yard interception return (Ray Vallee kick), 11:22. Colonels 7–2.
- LT – Solo Lewis 28-yard pass from Jack Turner (Buck Buchanan kick), 10:14. Bulldogs 9–7. Drive: 3 plays, 59 yards, 1:02.

Second Quarter

- LT – Marlion Jackson 14-yard pass from Blake Baker (kick blocked), 8:27. Bulldogs 15–7. Drive: 2 plays, 16 yards, 0:44.
- NICH – Gabe Showalter 38-yard field goal, 0:56. Bulldogs 15–10. Drive: 4 plays, 0 yards, 0:25.

Third Quarter

No scoring

Fourth Quarter

- LT – Buck Buchanan 24-yard field goal, 12:41. Bulldogs 18–10. Drive: 9 plays, 79 yards, 3:56.
- LT – Jimmy Holiday 6-yard run (Buck Buchanan kick), 7:12. Bulldogs 25–10. Drive: 8 plays, 71 yards, 4:15.
- NICH – Quincy Brown 27-yard pass from Pat McQuaide (Ray Vallee kick), 2:17. Bulldogs 25–17. Drive: 5 plays, 65 yards, 1:47.

Statistics	NICH	LT
First downs	13	16
Total yards	63–200	73–386
Rushing yards	37–62	41–109
Passing yards	138	277
Passing: Comp–Att–Int	10–26–0	16–32–3
Time of possession	28:18	31:42

Team	Category	Player	Statistics
Nicholls	Passing	Pat McQuaide	10/26, 138 yards, TD
Nicholls	Rushing	Collin Guggenheim	18 carries, 79 yards
Nicholls	Receiving	Quincy Brown	4 receptions, 70 yards, TD
Louisiana Tech	Passing	Blake Baker	12/24, 207 yards, TD
Louisiana Tech	Rushing	Marquis Crosby	9 carries, 44 yards
Louisiana Tech	Receiving	Marlion Jackson	3 receptions, 76 yards, TD

=== at No. 18 (FBS) LSU ===
Game Two – No. 22 Nicholls Colonels at No. 18 (FBS) LSU Tigers

Quarter	1	2	3	4	Total
No. 22 Colonels	7	7	7	0	21
No. 18 (FBS) Tigers	9	14	21	0	44

at Tiger Stadium, Baton Rouge, Louisiana

- Date: September 7
- Game time: 6:30 pm
- Game weather: Wind: NE 7 mph • Weather: Sunny • Temp: 79 °F (26 °C)
- Game attendance: 100,242
- Referee: Jeff Heaser
- TV announcers (SECN/ESPN+): Matt Schumacker (play-by-play), Dustin Fox (analyst), and Alex Chappell (sideline reporter)

Game information

First quarter

- (11:15) LSU – 0-yard safety (LSU 2–0)
- (7:51) LSU – Trey'Dez Green 1-yard pass from Garrett Nussmeier, Damian Ramos kick (Drive: 7 plays, 27 yards, 3:13; LSU 9–0)
- (0:30) NSU – Collin Guggenheim 2-yard run, Gabe Showalter kick (Drive: 13 plays, 84 yards, 7:17; LSU 9–7)

Second quarter

- (12:17) LSU – Kyren Lacy 32-yard pass from Garrett Nussmeier, Damian Ramos kick (Drive: 8 plays, 73 yards, 3:06; LSU 16–7)
- (4:18) NSU – Lee Negrotto 18-yard pass from Quincy Brown, Gabe Showalter kick (Drive: 13 plays, 75 yards, 7:59; LSU 16–14)
- (1:53) LSU – Ju'Juan Johnson 4-yard pass from Garrett Nussmeier, Damian Ramos kick (Drive: 5 plays, 75 yards, 2:25; LSU 23–14)

Third quarter

- (13:52) NSU – Collin Guggenheim 67-yard run, Gave Showalter kick (Drive: 2 plays, 75 yards, 1:08; LSU 23–21)
- (9:03) LSU – Kyren Lacy 6-yard pass from Garrett Nussmeier, Damian Ramos kick (Drive: 11 plays, 72 yards, 4:44; LSU 30–21)
- (6:43) LSU – Kyren Lacy 7-yard pass from Garrett Nussmeier, Damian Ramos kick (Drive: 5 plays, 41 yards, 2:10; LSU 37–21)
- (1:09) LSU – Zavion Thomas 4-yard pass from Garrett Nussmeier, Damian Ramos kick (Drive: 7 plays, 45 yards, 3:56; LSU 44–21)

Fourth quarter

No scoring

Statistics	NICH	LSU
First downs	16	24
Total yards	60–295	59–382
Rushing yards	38–150	21–68
Passing yards	145	314
Passing: Comp–Att–Int	16–22–0	28–38–0
Time of possession	31:09	28:51

Team	Category	Player	Statistics
Nicholls	Passing	Pat McQuaide	12/16, 113 yards
Nicholls	Rushing	Collin Guggenheim	25 carries, 145 yards, 2 TD
Nicholls	Receiving	Quincy Brown	5 receptions, 48 yards
LSU	Passing	Garrett Nussmeier	27/37, 302 yards, 6 TD
LSU	Rushing	Kaleb Johnson	8 carries, 28 yards
LSU	Receiving	CJ Daniels	4 receptions, 71 yards

=== at No. 11 Sacramento State ===
Game Three – No. 24 Nicholls Colonels at No. 11 Sacramento State Hornets

Quarter	1	2	Total
No. 24 Colonels			0
No. 11 Hornets			0

at Hornet Stadium, Sacramento, California

- Date: September 14
- Game time: 8:00 pm
- Game weather: Wind: • Weather: • Temp:
- TV announcers (ESPN+): Jason Ross (play-by-play) and Darren Arbet (analyst)

Game information

First Quarter

Second Quarter

Third Quarter

Fourth Quarter

Statistics	NICH	SAC
First downs		
Total yards		
Rushing yards		
Passing yards		
Passing: Comp–Att–Int		
Time of possession		

Team	Category	Player	Statistics
Nicholls	Passing		
Nicholls	Rushing		
Nicholls	Receiving		
Sacramento State	Passing		
Sacramento State	Rushing		
Sacramento State	Receiving		

=== Mississippi Valley State ===
Game Four – Mississippi Valley State Delta Devils at Nicholls Colonels

Quarter	1	2	Total
Delta Devils			0
Colonels			0

at Manning Field at John L. Guidry Stadium, Thibodaux, Louisiana

- Date: September 21
- Game time: TBA
- Game weather: Wind: • Weather: • Temp:
- TV: ESPN+

Game information

First Quarter

Second Quarter

Third Quarter

Fourth Quarter

Statistics	MVSU	NICH
First downs		
Total yards		
Rushing yards		
Passing yards		
Passing: Comp–Att–Int		
Time of possession		

Team	Category	Player	Statistics
Mississippi Valley State	Passing		
Mississippi Valley State	Rushing		
Mississippi Valley State	Receiving		
Nicholls	Passing		
Nicholls	Rushing		
Nicholls	Receiving		

=== at Southern ===
Game Five – Nicholls Colonels at Southern Jaguars

Quarter	1	2	Total
Colonels			0
Jaguars			0

at A.W. Mumford Stadium, Baton Rouge, Louisiana

- Date: October 5
- Game time: TBA
- Game weather: Wind: • Weather: • Temp:

Game information

First Quarter

Second Quarter

Third Quarter

Fourth Quarter

Statistics	NICH	SOU
First downs		
Total yards		
Rushing yards		
Passing yards		
Passing: Comp–Att–Int		
Time of possession		

Team	Category	Player	Statistics
Nicholls	Passing		
Nicholls	Rushing		
Nicholls	Receiving		
Southern	Passing		
Southern	Rushing		
Southern	Receiving		

=== at No. 15 Incarnate Word ===
Game Six – Nicholls Colonels at No. 15 Incarnate Word Cardinals

Quarter	1	2	3	4	Total
Colonels	3	7	0	0	10
No. 15 Cardinals	14	14	14	13	55

at Gayle and Tom Benson Stadium, San Antonio, Texas

- Date: October 12
- Game time: 6:00 pm
- Game weather: Temperature: 92 • Wind: S 8 mph • Weather: Sunny
- Game attendance: 1,801
- Referee: Craig Helser
- TV announcers (ESPN+): Karl Schoening (play-by-play), Sam Kaman (analyst), and Blair Villarreal (sideline)

Game information

First Quarter

- NSU – 5:42 Gabe Showalter 19 yard field goal
  NSU 3–0 Drive: 17 plays, 63 yards, 9:18
- UIW – 2:05 Lontrell Turner 30 yard pass from Zach Calzada, Brack Peacock kick
  UIW 7–3 Drive: 8 plays, 75 yards, 3:37
- UIW – 1:45 Lloyd Johnson 30 yard fumble recovery, Brack Peacock kick
  UIW 14–3

Second Quarter

- NSU – 10:30 Scrapy Osby 8 yard pass from Pat McQuade, Gabe Showalter kick
  UIW 14–10 Drive: 8 plays, 24 yards, 1:24
- UIW – 7:51 Jackson Lowe 16 yard pass from Zach Calzada, Brack Peacock kick
  UIW 21–10 Drive: 6 plays, 75 yards, 2:39
- UIW – 0:35 Jackson Lowe 5 yard pass from Zach Calzada, Brack Peacock kick
  UIW 28–10 Drive: 67 plays, 28 yards, 2:23

Third Quarter

- UIW – 11:35 Logan Compton 4 yard pass from Josh Lorick, Brack Peacock kick
  UIW 35–10 Drive: 2 plays, 17 yards, 0:45
- UIW – 0:00 Jalen Walthall 71 yard pass from Zach Calzada, Brack Peacock kick
  UIW 42–10 Drive: 8 plays, 733 yards, 3:30

Fourth Quarter

- UIW – 8:15 Jalen Walthall 7 yard pass from Zach Calzada, Brack Peacock kick
  UIW 49–10 Drive: 8 plays, 63 yards, 3:49
- UIW – 3:22 Dune Smith 55 yard interception return, Brack Peacock kick missed
  UIW 55–10

Statistics	NICH	UIW
First downs	18	16
Total yards	72-260	57-363
Rushing yards	40-123	23-89
Passing yards	137	274
Passing: Comp–Att–Int	19-32-2	26-34-1
Time of possession	36:24	23:36

Team	Category	Player	Statistics
Nicholls	Passing	Pat McQuaide	17/28, 90 yards, 1 TD, 2 INT
Nicholls	Rushing	Jaylon Spears	12 carries, 44 yards
Nicholls	Receiving	Dany'e Brooks	3 receptions, 41 yards
Incarnate Word	Passing	Zach Calzada	25/33, 270 yards, 5 TD, 1 INT
Incarnate Word	Rushing	Dekalon Taylor	6 carries, 31 yards
Incarnate Word	Receiving	Jalen Walthall	4 receptions, 80 yards, 2 TD

=== Northwestern State (NSU Challenge) ===
Game Seven – Northwestern State Demons at Nicholls Colonels

Quarter	1	2	3	4	Total
Demons	0	0	0	0	0
Colonels	7	10	3	0	20

at Manning Field at John L. Guidry Stadium, Thibodaux, Louisiana

- Date: October 19
- Game time: 11:00 a.m.
- Game weather: Sunny
- Game attendance: 5,494
- Referee: James Brookhart
- TV announcers (ESPN+): Jack Benjamin (play-by-play) and Wayde Keiser (analyst)

Game information

First Quarter

- NICH – Miequle Brock 4-yard pass from Pat McQuaide (Gabe Showalter kick), 2:23. Colonels 7–0. Drive: 12 plays, 73 yards, 5:37.

Second Quarter

- NICH – Lee Negrotto 23-yard pass from Pat McQuaide (Gabe Showalter kick), 13:45. Colonels 14–0. Drive: 7 plays, 50 yards, 2:05.
- NICH – Gabe Showalter 35-yard field goal, 1:17. Colonels 17–0. Drive: 7 plays, 31 yards, 1:45.

Third Quarter

- NICH – Gabe Showalter 39-yard field goal, 6:48. Colonels 20–0. Drive: 8 plays, 23 yards, 1:51.

Fourth Quarter

No scoring plays

Statistics	NWST	NICH
First downs	5	23
Total yards	46	393
Rushing yards	15	207
Passing yards	31	186
Passing: Comp–Att–Int	7–15–0	18–32–0
Time of possession	23:35	36:25

Team	Category	Player	Statistics
Northwestern State	Passing	Quaterius Hawkins	4/6, 19 yards
Northwestern State	Rushing	Reed Honshtein	1 carry, 21 yards
Northwestern State	Receiving	Ty Moore	1 reception, 15 yards
Nicholls	Passing	Pat McQuaide	18/32, 186 yards, 2 TD
Nicholls	Rushing	Collin Guggenheim	23 carries, 129 yards
Nicholls	Receiving	Lee Negrotto	3 receptions, 55 yards, TD

=== vs. McNeese ===
Game Eight – McNeese Cowboys vs Nicholls Colonels – Game summary

Quarter	1	2	3	4	Total
Cowboys	0	0	0	0	0
Colonels	0	0	0	0	0

at Guidry Stadium, Thibodaux, Louisiana

- Date: Saturday October 26, 2024
- Game time: 3:00 PM
- TV announcers (ESPN+): TBD

Game information

First quarter
Second quarter
Third quarter
Fourth quarter

Statistics	MCN	NICH
First downs		
Total yards		
Rushing yards		
Passing yards		
Passing: Comp–Att–Int		
Time of possession		

Team	Category	Player	Statistics
McNeese	Passing		
McNeese	Rushing		
McNeese	Receiving		
Nicholls	Passing		
Nicholls	Rushing		
Nicholls	Receiving		

=== Stephen F. Austin ===
Game Nine – Stephen F. Austin Lumberjacks (5–3; 3–2) at Nicholls Colonels (4–4; 2–1) – Game summary

Quarter	1	2	3	4	Total
Lumberjacks	0	21	7	0	28
Colonels	3	3	0	6	12

at Manning Field at John L. Guidry Stadium, Thibodaux, Louisiana

- Date: November 2
- Game time: 3:02 p.m.
- Game weather: Sunny
- Game attendance: 5,676
- TV: ESPN+
- Box Score

Game information

First Quarter

Second Quarter

Third Quarter

Fourth Quarter

Statistics	SFA	NICH
First downs	11	23
Total yards	49–301	98–413
Rushing yards	23–39	48–165
Passing yards	262	248
Passing: Comp–Att–Int	14–26–1	27–50–3
Time of possession	17:57	42:03

Team	Category	Player	Statistics
Stephen F. Austin	Passing	Sam Vidlak	14/25, 262 yards, 4 TD, INT
Stephen F. Austin	Rushing	Jerrell Wimbley	8 carries, 47 yards
Stephen F. Austin	Receiving	Kylon Harris	6 receptions, 106 yards, 2 TD
Nicholls	Passing	Pat McQuaide	27/50, 248 yards, TD, 3 INT
Nicholls	Rushing	Collin Guggenheim	17 carries, 80 yards
Nicholls	Receiving	Miequle Brock	9 receptions, 89 yards

=== at Houston Christian ===
Game Ten – Nicholls Colonels (4–5; 2–2) at Houston Christian Huskies (3–6; 1–3)

Quarter	1	2	Total
Colonels			0
Huskies			0

at Husky Stadium, Houston, Texas

- Date: November 9
- Game time: 2:00 pm
- Game weather: Wind: • Weather: • Temp:
- TV: ESPN+

Game information

First Quarter

Second Quarter

Third Quarter

Fourth Quarter

Statistics	NICH	HCU
First downs		
Total yards		
Rushing yards		
Passing yards		
Passing: Comp–Att–Int		
Time of possession		

Team	Category	Player	Statistics
Nicholls	Passing		
Nicholls	Rushing		
Nicholls	Receiving		
Houston Christian	Passing		
Houston Christian	Rushing		
Houston Christian	Receiving		

=== at Lamar ===
Game Eleven – Nicholls Colonels (4–6; 2–3) at Lamar Cardinals (5–5; 3–3)

Quarter	1	2	3	4	Total
Colonels	0	7	0	0	7
Cardinals	7	3	7	7	24

at Provost Umphrey Stadium, Beaumont, Texas

- Date: November 16
- Game time: 3:00 pm
- Game weather: Wind: SE 12mph • Weather: Cloudy • Temp: –
- Game attendance: 6,275
- Referee: James Brookhart
- TV: ESPN+
- Box score

Game information

First Quarter

- LU – 9:21 Fuselier, Kyndon 40 yd punt return (Woodard, Ben kick),LU 0–7, 2:26

Second Quarter

- LU – 5:57 Woodard, Ben 42 yd field goal,LU 0–10 Drive: 13 plays, 48 yards, 7:47
- NIC – 1:51 ufrene, Jackson 19 yd pass from McQuaide, Pat (Vallee, Ray kick),LU 7–10 Drive: 10 plays, 75 yards, 4:06

Third Quarter

- LU – 6:02 Griffin, Khalan 4 yd pass from Coleman, Robert (Woodard, Ben kick),LU 7–17 Drive: 7 play, 70 yards, 2:56

Fourth Quarter

- LU – 6:28 Gibbs, Devyn 13 yd pass from Coleman, Robert (Woodard, Ben kick),LU 7–24 Drive: 9 plays, 74 yards, 4:14

Statistics	NICH	LAM
First downs	16	17
Total yards	266	301
Rushing yards	68	150
Passing yards	198	151
Passing: Comp–Att–Int	21-34-3	12-21-2
Time of possession	28:32	31:28

Team	Category	Player	Statistics
Nicholls	Passing	Pat McQuaid	21-34-3, 198 yds, 1 TD
Nicholls	Rushing	Colin Guggenheim	7 carries, 22 yds
Nicholls	Receiving	Terry Matthews	7 receptions, 85 yds
Lamar	Passing	Robert Coleman	12-21-2, 151 yds, 2 TD
Lamar	Rushing	Khalan Griffin	21 carries, 89 yds
Lamar	Receiving	Kyndon Fuselier	3 receptions, 84 yds

=== Southeastern Louisiana (River Bell Classic) ===
Game Twelve – Southeastern Louisiana Lions (6–5; 5–1) at Nicholls Colonels (4–7; 2–4)

Quarter	1	2	Total
Lions			0
Colonels			0

at Manning Field at John L. Guidry Stadium, Thibodaux, Louisiana

- Date: November 21
- Game time: 6:00 p.m.
- Game weather: Wind: • Weather: • Temp:
- TV: ESPN+

Game information

First Quarter

Second Quarter

Third Quarter

Fourth Quarter

Statistics	SELA	NICH
First downs		
Total yards		
Rushing yards		
Passing yards		
Passing: Comp–Att–Int		
Time of possession		

Team	Category	Player	Statistics
Southeastern Louisiana	Passing		
Southeastern Louisiana	Rushing		
Southeastern Louisiana	Receiving		
Nicholls	Passing		
Nicholls	Rushing		
Nicholls	Receiving		
