= Qualan Jones =

American gridiron football player (born 2000)

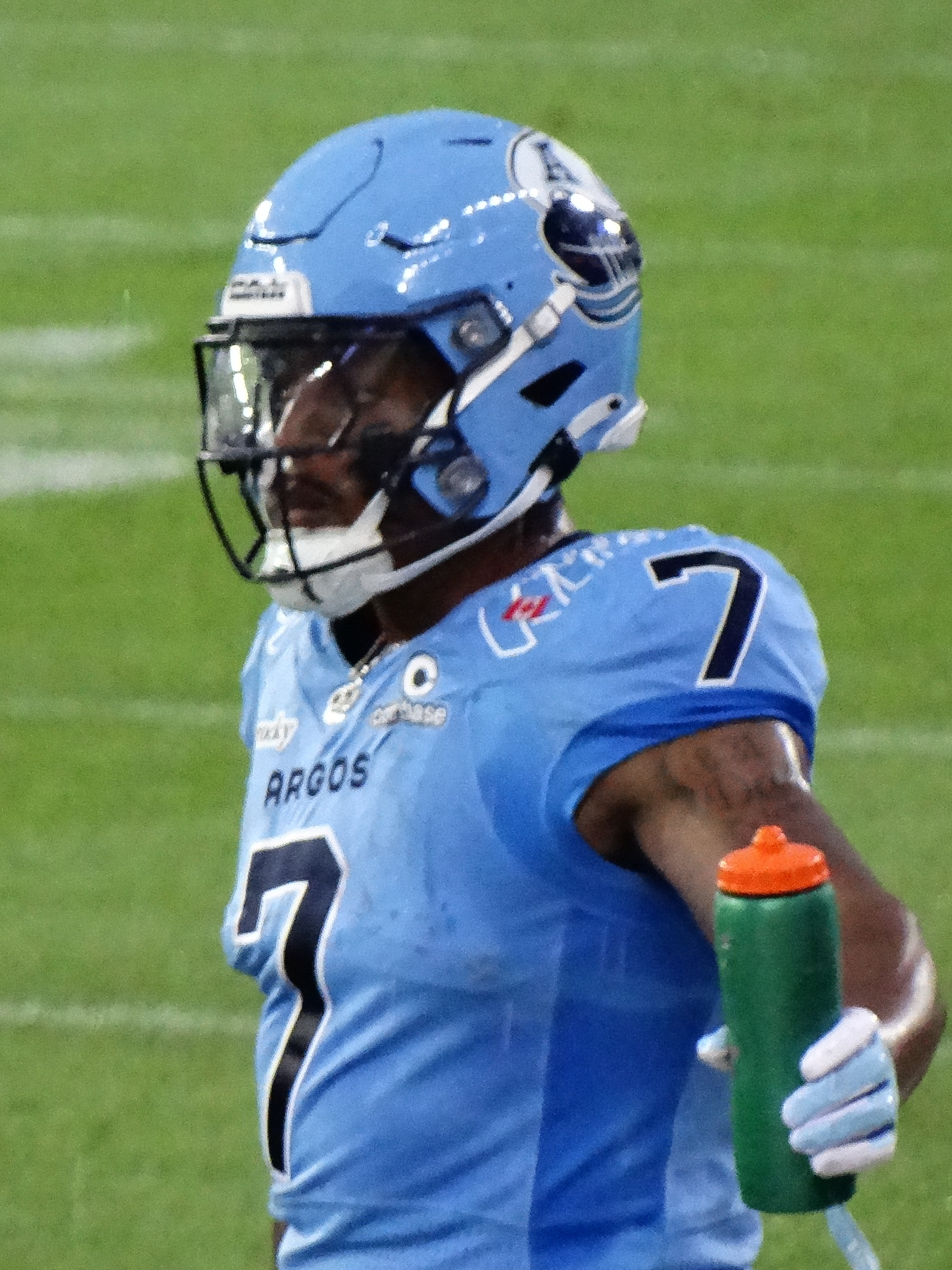
- Jones with the Toronto Argonauts in 2026

No. 7 – Toronto Argonauts
- Position: Running back
- Roster status: Practice roster
- CFL status: American

Personal information
- Born: November 21, 2000 (age 25); Cedar Hill, Texas, U.S.
- Listed height: 5 ft 10 in (1.78 m)
- Listed weight: 242 lb (110 kg)

Career information
- High school: Trinity Christian (Cedar Hill, Texas)
- College: Baylor (2019–2022); Stephen F. Austin (2024)

Career history
- 2026–present: Toronto Argonauts
- Stats at CFL.ca

Qualan Jones (born November 21, 2000) is an American professional football running back for the Toronto Argonauts of the Canadian Football League (CFL).

== College career ==
Jones first played college football for the Baylor Bears from 2019 to 2022 where he played in 30 games and had 139 carries for 689 yards and nine touchdowns. He also caught 37 passes for 192 yards. He then transferred to Stephen F. Austin University to play for the Lumberjacks in 2024 where he played in 10 games and had 147 rush attempts for 798 yards and eight touchdowns along with 13 receptions 80 yards.

== Professional career ==
After spending 2025 away from organized football, Jones signed with the Toronto Argonauts on February 17, 2026. Following training camp in 2026 he accepted a practice roster spot to start the season. However, the incumbent starter and fellow rookie, Samuel Hicks, was demoted and Jones made his professional debut on August 22, 2026, against the Hamilton Tiger-Cats, in a backup capacity where he recorded nine carries for 37 yards and three receptions for 28 yards.

== Personal life ==
Jones was born to Toya Green and Dion Jones.
