= Pioneer, Louisiana =

Village of Pioneer
- Village
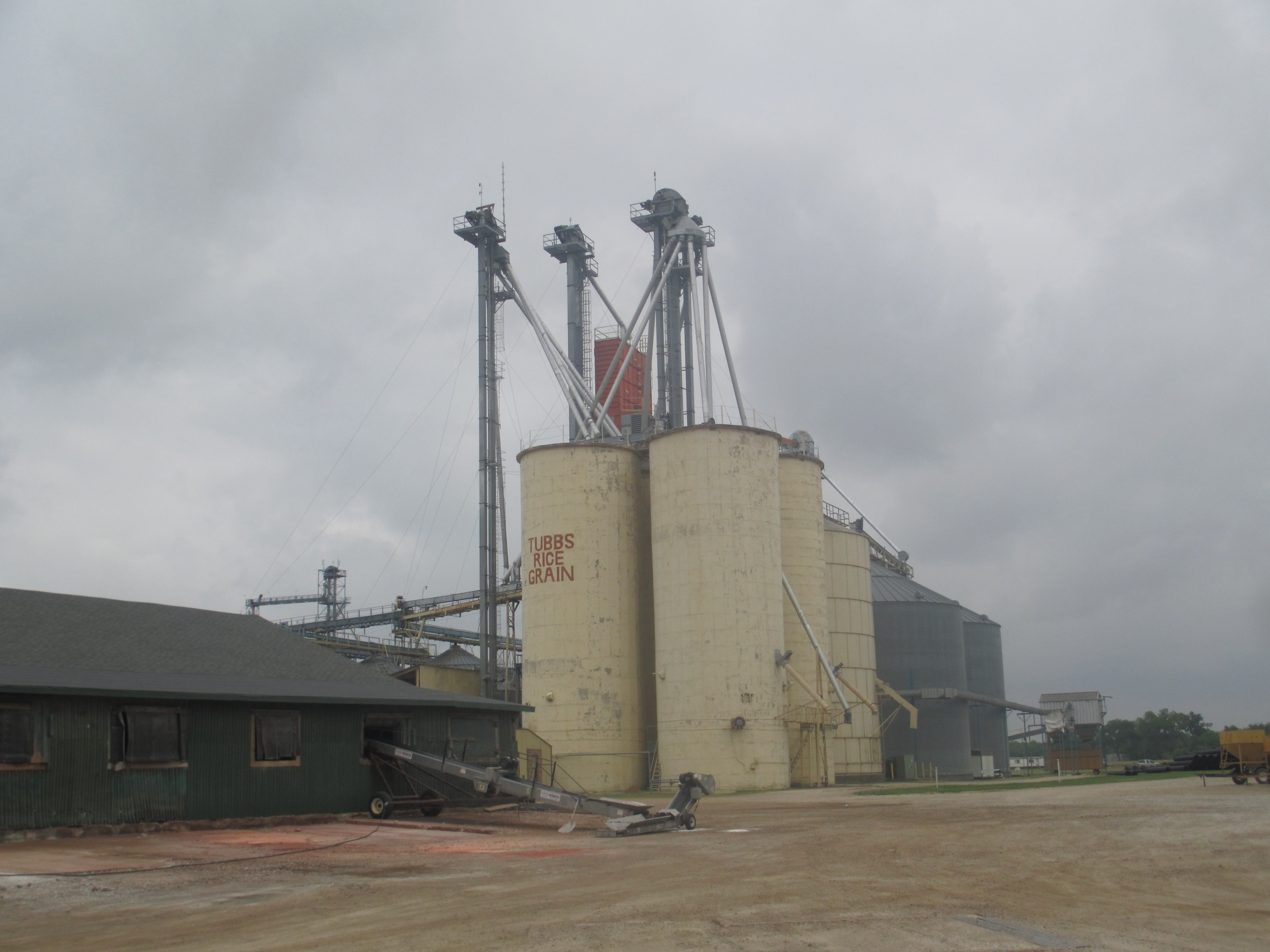
- Tubbs Rice Grain in Pioneer

- Location of Pioneer in West Carroll Parish, Louisiana.

- Location of Louisiana in the United States
- Coordinates: 32°44′17″N 91°26′17″W
- Country: United States
- State: Louisiana
- Parish: West Carroll

Area
  - Total: 1.08 sq mi (2.81 km^{2})
  - Land: 1.08 sq mi (2.81 km^{2})
  - Water: 0 sq mi (0.00 km^{2})
- Elevation: 105 ft (32 m)

Population (2020)
  - Total: 149
  - Density: 140/sq mi (53/km^{2})
- Time zone: UTC-6 (CST)
  - Summer (DST): UTC-5 (CDT)
- Area code: 318
- FIPS code: 22-60565
- GNIS feature ID: 2407524

Pioneer is a village in West Carroll Parish, Louisiana, United States. As of the 2020 census, Pioneer had a population of 149.

== History ==
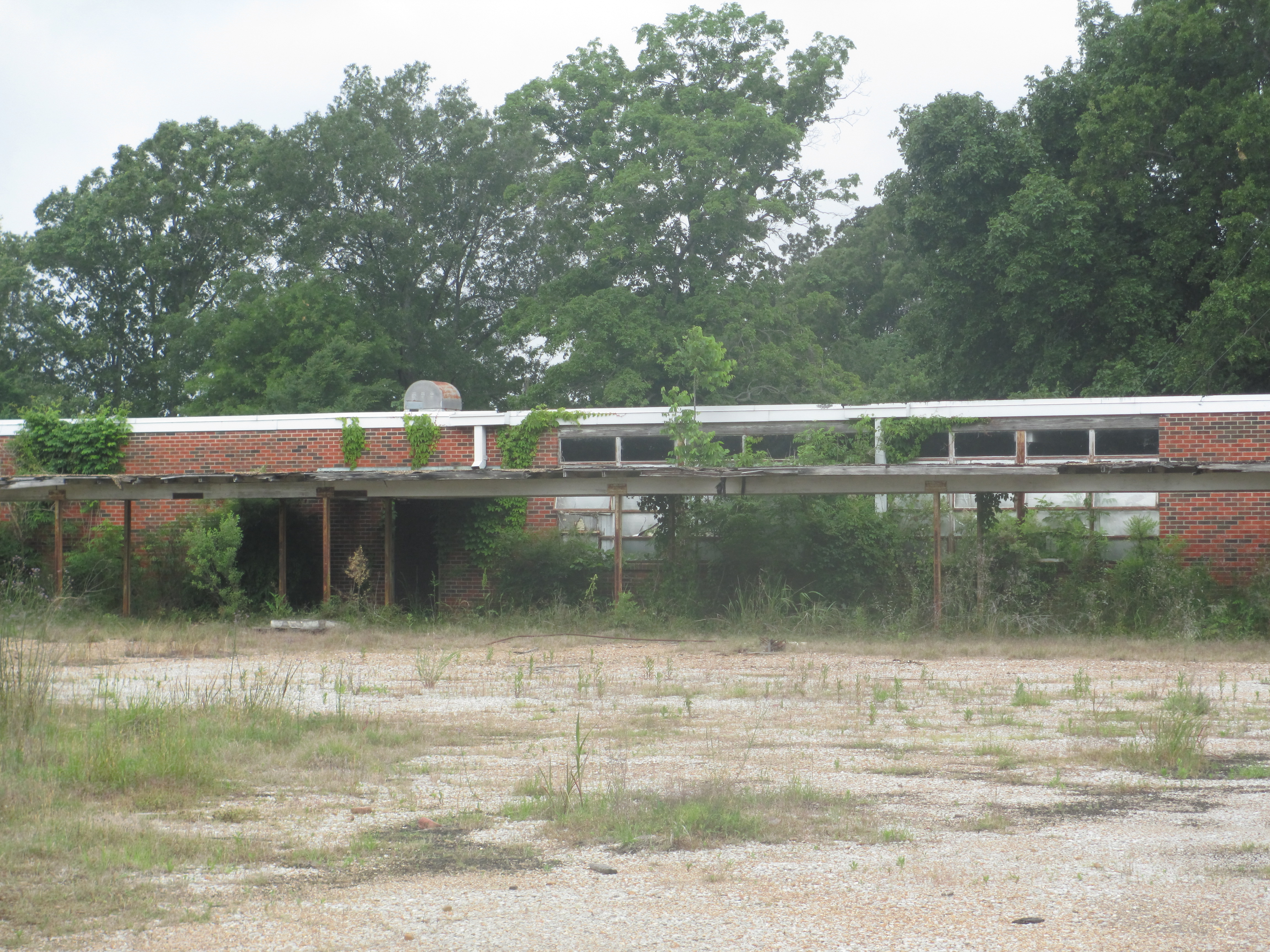
Abandoned school complex in Pioneer

Very little is known on the early history of the village, but it is likely the population increased due to steamboat traffic on Bayou Macon in the 1850s. Similarly to the other settlements along LA-17 in West Carroll Parish.

Pioneer was incorporated as a village in 1911.

== Geography ==
According to the United States Census Bureau, the village has a total area of 1.1 square miles (2.8 km^{2}), all land.

== Demographics ==
Historical population
Census	Pop.	Note	%±
1960	154		—
1970	188		22.1%
1980	221		17.6%
1990	116		−47.5%
2000	171		47.4%
2010	156		−8.8%
2020	149		−4.5%
2025 (est.)	149	Steady	0.0%
U.S. Decennial Census

Pioneer, Louisiana – Racial and ethnic composition Note: the US Census treats Hispanic/Latino as an ethnic category. This table excludes Latinos from the racial categories and assigns them to a separate category. Hispanics/Latinos may be of any race.
Race / Ethnicity (NH = Non-Hispanic)	Pop 2000	Pop 2010	Pop 2020	% 2000	% 2010	% 2020
White alone (NH)	81	89	53	47.37%	57.05%	35.57%
Black or African American alone (NH)	90	64	67	52.63%	41.03%	44.97%
Native American or Alaska Native alone (NH)	0	1	5	0.00%	0.64%	3.36%
Asian alone (NH)	0	0	0	0.00%	0.00%	0.00%
Pacific Islander alone (NH)	0	0	0	0.00%	0.00%	0.00%
Some Other Race alone (NH)	0	0	0	0.00%	0.00%	0.00%
Mixed Race/Multi-Racial (NH)	0	1	8	0.00%	0.64%	5.37%
Hispanic or Latino (any race)	0	1	16	0.00%	0.64%	10.74%
Total	171	156	149	100.00%	100.00%	100.00%

As of the census of 2000, there were 171 people, 65 households, and 39 families residing in the village. The population density was 157.2 inhabitants per square mile (60.7/km^{2}). There were 70 housing units at an average density of 64.3 per square mile (24.8/km^{2}). The racial makeup of the village was 47.37% White and 52.63% African American.

There were 65 households, out of which 27.7% had children under the age of 18 living with them, 35.4% were married couples living together, 23.1% had a female householder with no husband present, and 38.5% were non-families. 32.3% of all households were made up of individuals, and 13.8% had someone living alone who was 65 years of age or older. The average household size was 2.63 and the average family size was 3.40.

In the village, the population was spread out, with 29.2% under the age of 18, 14.0% from 18 to 24, 22.2% from 25 to 44, 21.6% from 45 to 64, and 12.9% who were 65 years of age or older. The median age was 30 years. For every 100 females, there were 76.3 males. For every 100 females age 18 and over, there were 80.6 males.

The median income for a household in the village was $17,614, and the median income for a family was $19,375. Males had a median income of $17,917 versus $23,125 for females. The per capita income for the village was $9,842. About 41.5% of families and 50.3% of the population were below the poverty line, including 58.8% of those under the age of eighteen and 23.7% of those 65 or over.

== Education ==
Public schools in West Carroll Parish are operated by the West Carroll Parish School Board. The village of Pioneer was zoned to Pioneer Elementary School prior to the end of the 2006–07 school year. The school was closed as part of a parish-wide school consolidation plan that also saw another campus, Fiske Union Elementary School, closed as well. At the beginning of the 2007–08 school year, most Pioneer students were moved to nearby Forest High School in the village of Forest. Approximately 55 students who lived in the northeastern corner of the area zoned to Pioneer were sent to Oak Grove High School in Oak Grove.
