= 2024 Southeastern Louisiana Lions football team =

American college football season

2024 Southeastern Louisiana Lions football
- Conference: Southland Conference
- Record: 7–5 (6–1 Southland)
- Head coach: Frank Scelfo (7th season)
- Offensive coordinator: Anthony Scelfo (1st season)
- Offensive scheme: Multiple
- Defensive coordinator: Bill D'Ottavio (3rd season)
- Base defense: Multiple 3–4
- Home stadium: Strawberry Stadium

2024 Southland Conference football standings
	Conf.			Overall
Team	W		L	W		L
No. 6 Incarnate Word $^	7	–	0	11	–	3
Southeastern Louisiana	6	–	1	7	–	5
Stephen F. Austin	4	–	3	7	–	5
Lamar	4	–	3	7	–	5
McNeese	3	–	4	6	–	6
Houston Christian	3	–	4	5	–	7
East Texas A&M*	2	–	4	3	–	9
Nicholls	2	–	5	4	–	8
Northwestern State	0	–	7	0	–	12
$ – Conference champion; ^ – FCS playoff participant; * – East Texas A&M was ineligible for FCS postseason play due to transition from NCAA Division II.; Rankings from STATS Poll

The 2024 Southeastern Louisiana Lions football team represented Southeastern Louisiana University as a member of the Southland Conference during the 2024 NCAA Division I FCS football season. They were led by head coach Frank Scelfo, who was coaching in his seventh season with the program. The Lions played their home games at Strawberry Stadium in Hammond, Louisiana.

== Preseason ==
=== Recruiting class ===
College recruiting (2024)
Name	Hometown	School	Height	Weight	40^{‡}	Commit date
Amiree Alexander; OL	Reserve, LA	Riverside Academy	6 ft 2 in (1.88 m)	315 lb (143 kg)	-	
Amiree Alexander; OL	Recruit ratings: No ratings found					
Evan Aubrey; DE	Orleans, Ontario, Canada	Clearwater Academy International	6 ft 4 in (1.93 m)	225 lb (102 kg)	-	
Evan Aubrey; DE	Recruit ratings: No ratings found					
Otto Brewer III; DE	Gulf Shores, AL	Gulf Shores HS	6 ft 3 in (1.91 m)	245 lb (111 kg)	-	
Otto Brewer III; DE	Recruit ratings: No ratings found					
Lamar Brown; DE	Coatesville, PA	Coatesville Area HS; Sussex County CC	6 ft 3 in (1.91 m)	230 lb (100 kg)	-	
Lamar Brown; DE	Recruit ratings: No ratings found					
Tre Brown; DB	New Orleans, LA	Edna Karr HS	5 ft 11 in (1.80 m)	175 lb (79 kg)	-	
Tre Brown; DB	Recruit ratings: No ratings found					
Kyle Cannon; LB	LaPlace, LA	St. Charles Catholic HS	6 ft 1 in (1.85 m)	220 lb (100 kg)	-	
Kyle Cannon; LB	Recruit ratings: No ratings found					
Taboris "TJ" Charles; RB	Moss Point, MS	Moss Point HS	5 ft 11 in (1.80 m)	180 lb (82 kg)	-	
Taboris "TJ" Charles; RB	Recruit ratings: No ratings found					
Levi Darensbourg; CB	New Orleans, LA	Edna Karr HS	6 ft 0 in (1.83 m)	170 lb (77 kg)	-	
Levi Darensbourg; CB	Recruit ratings: No ratings found					
Will Davidson; LS	Marietta, GA	Lassiter HS	5 ft 11 in (1.80 m)	190 lb (86 kg)	-	
Will Davidson; LS	Recruit ratings: No ratings found					
Jermaine Davis; DB	Hammond, LA	Hammond HS	5 ft 10 in (1.78 m)	165 lb (75 kg)	-	
Jermaine Davis; DB	Recruit ratings: No ratings found					
Louis Gendron; DT	Levis, Quebec, Canada	Clearwater Academy International	6 ft 3 in (1.91 m)	280 lb (130 kg)	-	
Louis Gendron; DT	Recruit ratings: No ratings found					
Stiles Guidry; LB	Amite, LA	Oak Forest Academy	6 ft 1 in (1.85 m)	225 lb (102 kg)	-	
Stiles Guidry; LB	Recruit ratings: No ratings found					
Carter Hanberry; LB	Geismar, LA	Dutchtown HS	6 ft 0 in (1.83 m)	200 lb (91 kg)	-	
Carter Hanberry; LB	Recruit ratings: No ratings found					
James Harris; DE	Oak Grove, LA	Oak Grove HS	6 ft 2 in (1.88 m)	225 lb (102 kg)	-	
James Harris; DE	Recruit ratings: No ratings found					
Isaiah Hayes; OL	Clearwater, FL	Clearwater Academy International	6 ft 4 in (1.93 m)	300 lb (140 kg)	-	
Isaiah Hayes; OL	Recruit ratings: No ratings found					
Zane Hooper; OL	Denham Springs, LA	Denham Springs HS; Copiah–Lincoln CC	6 ft 0 in (1.83 m)	270 lb (120 kg)	-	
Zane Hooper; OL	Recruit ratings: No ratings found					
D'Khai Joseph; WR	Reserve, LA	East St. John HS	5 ft 10 in (1.78 m)	160 lb (73 kg)	-	
D'Khai Joseph; WR	Recruit ratings: No ratings found					
Shakespeare Louis; DB	Ottawa, Ontario, Canada	Clearwater Academy International; Robert Morris	6 ft 1 in (1.85 m)	205 lb (93 kg)	-	
Shakespeare Louis; DB	Recruit ratings: No ratings found					
Tanner Murray; QB	Houston, TX	Langham Creek HS; Butler CC	6 ft 3 in (1.91 m)	195 lb (88 kg)	-	
Tanner Murray; QB	Recruit ratings: No ratings found					
Raiyen Oatis; DB	Donaldsonville, LA	Donaldsonville HS	5 ft 11 in (1.80 m)	175 lb (79 kg)	-	
Raiyen Oatis; DB	Recruit ratings: No ratings found					
Darnell O'Quinn; WR	New Orleans, LA	John Ehret HS	6 ft 0 in (1.83 m)	170 lb (77 kg)	-	
Darnell O'Quinn; WR	Recruit ratings: No ratings found					
Jamarcus Pittman; QB	McComb, MS	McComb HS	6 ft 3 in (1.91 m)	220 lb (100 kg)	-	
Jamarcus Pittman; QB	Recruit ratings: No ratings found					
Damian Reed; OL	Iowa, LA	Iowa HS	6 ft 2 in (1.88 m)	275 lb (125 kg)	-	
Damian Reed; OL	Recruit ratings: No ratings found					
Joe Sniffin; LB	Belton, TX	Belton HS; Trinity Valley CC	6 ft 1 in (1.85 m)	225 lb (102 kg)	-	
Joe Sniffin; LB	Recruit ratings: No ratings found					
Nick Turner; DB	Slidell, LA	Brother Martin HS; Arkansas; Toledo	5 ft 11 in (1.80 m)	190 lb (86 kg)	–	
Nick Turner; DB	Recruit ratings: No ratings found					
Jaedon Voisin; TE/RB	Belle Chasse, LA	Belle Chasse HS	6 ft 2 in (1.88 m)	240 lb (110 kg)	-	
Jaedon Voisin; TE/RB	Recruit ratings: No ratings found					
BJ Wagner; DB	Orlando, FL	Orlando Christian Prep; El Camino College	6 ft 2 in (1.88 m)	200 lb (91 kg)	-	
BJ Wagner; DB	Recruit ratings: No ratings found					
Adyn Wilkinson; TE	Baton Rouge, LA	Central HS	6 ft 4 in (1.93 m)	230 lb (100 kg)	-	
Adyn Wilkinson; TE	Recruit ratings: No ratings found					
Nico Williams; QB	Gulfport, MS	Gulfport HS	6 ft 5 in (1.96 m)	200 lb (91 kg)	-	
Nico Williams; QB	Recruit ratings: No ratings found					

=== Preseason poll ===
The Southland Conference released their preseason poll on July 22, 2024. The Lions were picked to finish third in the conference.

=== Preseason All–Southland Teams ===
The Southland Conference announced the 2024 preseason all-conference football team selections on July 22, 2024. SLU had a total of five players selected.

Offense

1st Team

- Darius Lewis – Wide receiver, RS-SR
- Jhy Orgeron – Offensive lineman, SR

2nd Team

- Harlan Dixon – Running back, SR
- Brockhim Wicks – Offensive lineman, RS-SR

Defense

1st Team

- Darius Lewis – Punt returner, RS-SR

2nd Team

- Donte' Daniels – Linebacker, SR
- Darius Lewis – Kick returner, RS-SR

== Schedule ==
Date	Time	Opponent	Site	TV	Result	Attendance
August 29	7:00 pm	at Tulane*	Yulman Stadium; New Orleans, LA	ESPN+	L 0–52	20,143
September 7	6:00 pm	at Southern Miss*	M. M. Roberts Stadium; Hattiesburg, MS	ESPN+	L 10–35	22,044
September 14	6:00 pm	Eastern Washington*	Strawberry Stadium; Hammond, LA	ESPN+	W 28–24	5,387
September 21	6:00 pm	No. 1 South Dakota State*	Strawberry Stadium; Hammond, LA	ESPN+	L 0–41	4,387
September 28	6:00 p.m.	at No. 16 Tarleton State*	Memorial Stadium; Stephenville, TX	ESPN+	L 33–36	22,312
October 5	6:00 pm	Texas A&M–Commerce	Strawberry Stadium; Hammond, LA	ESPN+	W 21–9	3,758
October 12	2:00 pm	at Houston Christian	Husky Stadium; Houston, TX	ESPN+	W 37–7	1,825
October 19	4:00 pm	Stephen F. Austin^{†}	Strawberry Stadium; Hammond, LA	ESPN+	W 24–23	4,622
October 26	6:00 pm	No. 10 Incarnate Word	Strawberry Stadium; Hammond, LA	ESPN+	L 31–34	3,116
November 2	3:00 pm	at Lamar	Provost Umphrey Stadium; Beaumont, TX	ESPN+	W 30–27 ^{OT}	5,593
November 9	6:00 pm	Northwestern State	Strawberry Stadium; Hammond, LA (rivalry)	ESPN+	W 41–0	3,321
November 21	6:00 pm	at Nicholls	Manning Field at John L. Guidry Stadium; Thibodaux, LA (River Bell Classic)	ESPN+	W 19–16	6,955
*Non-conference game; ^{†}Homecoming; Rankings from STATS Poll released prior to the game; All times are in Central time

== Game summaries ==
=== at Tulane (FBS) ===
Game One – Southeastern Louisiana Lions (0–0) at Tulane Green Wave (FBS) (0–0)

Quarter	1	2	3	4	Total
Lions	0	0	0	0	0
Green Wave (FBS)	7	14	14	17	52

at Yulman Stadium • New Orleans, LA

- Date: Thursday August 29, 2024
- Game time: 7:00 p.m.
- Game weather: Rain • Temperature: 80 °F (27 °C) • Wind: SE at 6 miles per hour (9.7 km/h)
- Game attendance: 20,143
- Referee: Darryl DeBerry
- TV announcers (ESPN+): Mark Neely (play-by-play) and Ahman Green (analyst)
- Box Score

Game information

First quarter

- (3:30) TUL – Yulkeith Brown 11-yard pass from Darian Mensah, Jacob Barnes kick (Drive: 11 plays, 75 yards, 5:59; Tulane 7–0)

Second quarter

- (9:45) TUL – Makhi Hughes 2-yard run, Jacob Barnes kick (Drive: 10 plays, 72 yards, 5:10; Tulane 14–0)
- (0:42) TUL – Rayshawn Pleasant 100-yard reception, Jacob Barnes kick (Tulane 21–0)

Third quarter

- (11:20) TUL – Ty Thompson 8-yard run, Jacob Barnes kick (Drive: 7 plays, 75 yards, 3:40; Tulane 28–0)
- (3:40) TUL – Arnold Barnes III 1-yard run, Jacob Barnes kick (Drive: 6 plays, 57 yards, 2:59; Tulane 35–0)

Fourth quarter

- (14:54) TUL – Alex Bauman 12-yard pass from Darian Mensah, Jacob Barnes kick (Drive: 3 plays, 85 yards, 1:11; Tulane 42–0)
- (10:02) TUL – Ty Thompson 4-yard run, Jacob Barnes kick (Drive: 6 plays, 47 yards, 3:33; Tulane 49–0)
- (2:06) TUL – Jacob Barnes 38-yard field goal (Drive: 11 plays, 67 yards, 5:37; Tulane 52–0)

Statistics	SELA	TULN
First downs	14	25
Total yards	201	472
Rushing yards	102	241
Passing yards	99	231
Passing: Comp–Att–Int	14–21–1	13–17–0
Time of possession	29:47	30:13

Team	Category	Player	Statistics
Southeastern Louisiana	Passing	Eli Sawyer	14/19, 99 yards, INT
Southeastern Louisiana	Rushing	Anthonio Martin Jr.	13 carries, 68 yards
Southeastern Louisiana	Receiving	Darius Lewis	5 receptions, 44 yards
Tulane	Passing	Darian Mensah	10/12, 205 yards, 2 TD
Tulane	Rushing	Makhi Hughes	14 carries, 59 yards, TD
Tulane	Receiving	Mario Williams	4 receptions, 124 yards

=== at Southern Miss (FBS) ===
Game Two – Southeastern Louisiana Lions (0–1) at Southern Miss Golden Eagles (0–1)

Quarter	1	2	3	4	Total
Lions	3	7	0	0	10
Golden Eagles (FBS)	7	7	7	14	35

at M. M. Roberts Stadium, Hattiesburg, Mississippi

- Date: September 7
- Game time: 6:02 pm
- Game weather: Sunny • Temperature: 83 °F (28 °C) • Wind: NE at 7 miles per hour (11 km/h)
- Game attendance: 22,044
- Referee: Bruce Austin
- TV announcers (ESPN+): Jason Baker (play-by-play) and Austin Davis (analyst)
- Box Score

Game information

First Quarter

- (8:14) SLU – Riley Callaghan 25-yard field goal (Drive: 4 plays, 3 yards, 1:58; SLU 3–0)
- (1:03) USM – Kyirin Heath 9-yard pass from Tate Rodemaker (Andrew Stein kick) (Drive: 4 plays, 13 yards, 2:14; USM 7–3)

Second Quarter

- (7:11) USM – Dalton Davis 5-yard pass from Tate Rodemaker (Andrew Stein kick) (Drive: 11 plays, 88 yards, 4:53; USM 14–3)
- (0:14) SLU – Anthonio Martin Jr. 10-yard run (Riley Callaghan kick) (Drive: 10 plays, 69 yards, 3:03; USM 14–10)

Third Quarter

- (5:22) USM – Rodrigues Clark 1-yard run (Andrew Stein kick) (Drive: 5 plays, 64 yards, 1:55; USM 21–10)

Fourth Quarter

- (13:19) USM – Dylan Lawrence 63-yard interception (Andrew Stein kick) (USM 28–10)
- (1:44) USM – Kenyon Clay 70-yard run (Andrew Stein kick) (Drive: 1 play, 70 yards, 0:11; USM 35–10)

Statistics	SELA	USM
First downs	18	17
Total yards	74–274	60–359
Rushing yards	33–102	26–121
Passing yards	172	238
Passing: Comp–Att–Int	22–41–1	19–34–0
Time of possession	34:21	25:39

Team	Category	Player	Statistics
Southeastern Louisiana	Passing	Eli Sawyer	21/39, 153 yards, INT
Southeastern Louisiana	Rushing	Anthonio Martin Jr.	15 carries, 93 yards, TD
Southeastern Louisiana	Receiving	Darius Lewis	7 receptions, 51 yards
Southern Miss	Passing	Tate Rodemaker	18/33, 179 yards, 2 TD
Southern Miss	Rushing	Kenyon Clay	4 carries, 75 yards, TD
Southern Miss	Receiving	Larry Simmons	5 receptions, 100 yards

=== Eastern Washington ===
Game Three – Eastern Washington Eagles (1–1) at Southeastern Louisiana Lions (0–2)

Quarter	1	2	3	4	Total
Eagles	7	14	3	0	24
Lions	7	14	0	7	28

at Strawberry Stadium, Hammond, Louisiana

- Date: September 14
- Game time: 6:03 pm
- Game weather: Cloudy • Temperature: 80 °F (27 °C) • Wind: SW at 5 miles per hour (8.0 km/h)
- Game attendance: 5,387
- TV announcers (ESPN+): Lucas Hill
- Box Score

Game information

First Quarter

Second Quarter

Third Quarter

Fourth Quarter

Statistics	EWU	SELA
First downs	16	25
Total yards	57–333	71–341
Rushing yards	29–90	47–253
Passing yards	243	88
Passing: Comp–Att–Int	21–28–0	15–24–0
Time of possession	25:41	34:19

Team	Category	Player	Statistics
Eastern Washington	Passing	Kekoa Visperas	21/28, 243 yards, 1 TD
Eastern Washington	Rushing	Malik Dotson	11 carries, 47 yards, 2 TD
Eastern Washington	Receiving	Efton Chism III	7 receptions, 83 yards
Southeastern Louisiana	Passing	Eli Sawyer	12/21, 72 yards, 2 TD
Southeastern Louisiana	Rushing	Antonio Martin Jr.	28 carries, 149 yards
Southeastern Louisiana	Receiving	Darius Lewis	6 receptions, 32 yards, 1 TD

=== No. 1 South Dakota State ===
Game Four – No. 1 South Dakota State Jackrabbits (2–1) at Southeastern Louisiana Lions (1–2)

Quarter	1	2	3	4	Total
No. 1 Jackrabbits	7	13	14	7	41
Lions	0	0	0	0	0

at Strawberry Stadium, Hammond, Louisiana

- Date: September 21
- Game time: 6:03 pm
- Game weather: Clear Temperature: 88 °F (31 °C) • Wind: SE at 7 miles per hour (11 km/h)
- Game attendance: 4,387
- TV: ESPN+
- Box Score

Game information

First Quarter

Second Quarter

Third Quarter

Fourth Quarter

Statistics	SDST	SELA
First downs	18	13
Total yards	55–417	64–186
Rushing yards	36–341	41–94
Passing yards	76	92
Passing: Comp–Att–Int	8–19–1	10–23–2
Time of possession	25:52	34:08

Team	Category	Player	Statistics
South Dakota State	Passing	Mark Gronowski	7/17, 65 yards, 1 INT
South Dakota State	Rushing	Kirby Vorhees	5 carries, 179 yards, 3 TD
South Dakota State	Receiving	Amar Johnson	3 receptions, 37 yards
Southeastern Louisiana	Passing	Damon Sewart	9/20, 91 yards, 2 INT
Southeastern Louisiana	Rushing	Antonio Martin Jr.	14 carries, 36 yards
Southeastern Louisiana	Receiving	Darius Lewis	5 receptions, 56 yards

=== at No. 16 Tarleton State ===
Game Five – Southeastern Louisiana Lions (1–3) vs No. 16 Tarleton State Texans (3–1)

Quarter	1	2	3	4	Total
Lions	0	16	10	7	33
No. 16 Texans	0	14	15	7	36

at Memorial Stadium • Stephenville, TX

- Date: Saturday September 28, 2024
- Game time: 6:03 p.m.
- Game weather: Clear Temperature: 86 °F (30 °C) • Wind: NW at 8 miles per hour (13 km/h)
- Game attendance: 22,312
- TV: ESPN+
- Box Score

Game information

First quarter
Second quarter
Third quarter
Fourth quarter

Statistics	SELA	TAR
First downs	22	24
Total yards	73–396	67–416
Rushing yards	44–236	41–213
Passing yards	160	203
Passing: Comp–Att–Int	18–29–1	15–26–1
Time of possession	31:12	28:48

Team	Category	Player	Statistics
Southeastern Louisiana	Passing	Eli Sawyer	17/27, 155 yards, 1 INT
Southeastern Louisiana	Rushing	Antonio Martin Jr.	32 carries, 206 yards, 3 TD
Southeastern Louisiana	Receiving	Jaylon Domingeaux	4 receptions, 59 yards
Tarleton State	Passing	Victor Gabalis	15/26, 203 yards, 3 TD, 1 INT
Tarleton State	Rushing	Kayvon Britten	28 carries, 174 yards, 1 TD
Tarleton State	Receiving	Darius Cooper	8 receptions, 90 yards, 2 TD

=== Texas A&M–Commerce ===
Game Six – Texas A&M–Commerce Lions (0–4; 0–0 SLC) at Southeastern Louisiana Lions (1–4; 0–0)

Quarter	1	2	3	4	Total
Texas A&M-Commerce	0	0	3	6	9
Southeastern Louisiana	0	7	7	7	21

at Strawberry Stadium, Hammond, Louisiana

- Date: October 5
- Game time: 6:00 pm
- Game weather: Cloudy • Temperature: 82 °F (28 °C) • Wind: E at 5 miles per hour (8.0 km/h)
- Game attendance: 3,758
- Referee: James Brookhart
- TV: ESPN+
- Box Score

Game information

First Quarter

No scoring plays

Second Quarter

- SELA – Antonio Martin Jr. 58-yard run (Braydon Nelson kick), 7:17. Southeastern Louisiana 7–0. Drive: 4 plays, 88 yards, 1:37.

Third Quarter

- AMC – Luke Jackson 21-yard field goal, 9:25. Southeastern Louisiana 7–3. Drive: 11 plays, 61 yards, 5:35.
- SELA – Cade Collier 9-yard pass from Eli Sawyer (Braydon Nelson kick), 0:35. Southeastern Louisiana 14–3. Drive: 8 plays, 51 yards, 3:38.

Fourth Quarter

- AMC – Tyler Daniels 8-yard pass from Ron Peace (run failed), 10:49. Southeastern Louisiana 14–9. Drive: 7 plays, 64 yards, 3:23.
- SELA – Antonio Martin Jr. 1-yard run (Braydon Nelson kick), 2:47. Southeastern Louisiana 21–9. Drive: 9 plays, 84 yards, 4:51.

Statistics	TAMC	SELA
First downs	15	21
Total yards	66–277	69–364
Rushing yards	28–62	38–170
Passing yards	215	194
Passing: Comp–Att–Int	25–38–0	17–31–1
Time of possession	30:21	29:39

Team	Category	Player	Statistics
Texas A&M-Commerce	Passing	Ron Peace	18/25, 161 yards, TD
Texas A&M-Commerce	Rushing	B. K. Jackson	10 carries, 40 yards
Texas A&M-Commerce	Receiving	Christian Jourdain	8 receptions, 96 yards
Southeastern Louisiana	Passing	Eli Sawyer	17/31, 194 yards, TD, INT
Southeastern Louisiana	Rushing	Antonio Martin Jr.	27 carries, 185 yards, 2 TD
Southeastern Louisiana	Receiving	Darius Lewis	8 receptions, 111 yards

=== at Houston Christian ===
Game Seven – Southeastern Louisiana Lions (2–4; 1–0) at Houston Christian Huskies (3–3; 1–0)

Quarter	1	2	3	4	Total
Lions	7	13	10	7	37
Huskies	7	0	0	0	7

at Husky Stadium, Houston, Texas

- Date: October 12
- Game time: 2:03 pm
- Game weather: Sunny Temperature: 90 °F (32 °C) • Wind: N at 5 miles per hour (8.0 km/h)
- Game attendance: 1,825
- TV: ESPN+
- Box Score

Game information

First Quarter

Second Quarter

Third Quarter

Fourth Quarter

Statistics	SELA	HCU
First downs	21	13
Total yards	69–446	65–326
Rushing yards	41–278	45–238
Passing yards	168	88
Passing: Comp–Att–Int	19–28–0	6–20–1
Time of possession	35:17	24:43

Team	Category	Player	Statistics
Southeastern Louisiana	Passing	Eli Sawyer	18/26, 144 yards, 2 TD
Southeastern Louisiana	Rushing	Rodeo Graham Jr.	8 carries, 109 yards
Southeastern Louisiana	Receiving	Darius Lewis	4 receptions, 46 yards
Houston Christian	Passing	CJ Rogers	4/12, 75 yards
Houston Christian	Rushing	Darryle Evans	20 carries, 128 yards
Houston Christian	Receiving	Deuce McMillan	2 receptions, 47 yards

=== Stephen F. Austin ===
Game Eight – Stephen F. Austin Lumberjacks (4–2; 2–1) at Southeastern Louisiana Lions (3–4; 2–0)

Quarter	1	2	3	4	Total
Lumberjacks	7	3	3	10	23
Lions	7	7	0	10	24

at Strawberry Stadium, Hammond, Louisiana

- Date: October 19
- Game time: 4:03 pm
- Game weather: Sunny Temperature: 79 °F (26 °C) • Wind: E at 5 miles per hour (8.0 km/h)
- Game attendance: 4,622
- TV: ESPN+
- Box Score

Game information

First Quarter

Second Quarter

Third Quarter

Fourth Quarter

Statistics	SFA	SELA
First downs	21	22
Total yards	66–337	68–348
Rushing yards	28–93	33–114
Passing yards	244	234
Passing: Comp–Att–Int	29–38–0	24–35–0
Time of possession	26:41	33:19

Team	Category	Player	Statistics
Stephen F. Austin	Passing	Sam Vidlak	29/38, 244 yards, 1 TD
Stephen F. Austin	Rushing	Jerrell Wimbley	11 carries, 83 yards
Stephen F. Austin	Receiving	Kylon Harris	13 receptions, 116 yards
Southeastern Louisiana	Passing	Eli Sawyer	24/35, 234 yards, 1 TD
Southeastern Louisiana	Rushing	Antonio Martin Jr.	21 carries, 87yards, 1 TD
Southeastern Louisiana	Receiving	Darius Lewis	11 receptions, 96 yards, 1 TD

=== No. 10 Incarnate Word ===
Game Nine – No. 10 Incarnate Word Cardinals (5–2; 2–0) at Southeastern Louisiana Lions (4–4; 3–0)

Quarter	1	2	3	4	Total
No. 10 Cardinals	7	13	7	7	34
Lions	3	10	10	8	31

at Strawberry Stadium, Hammond, Louisiana

- Date: October 26
- Game time: 6:00 pm
- Game weather: Temperature: 80 • Wind: S 7 mph • Weather: Clear
- Game attendance: 3,116
- Referee: James Brookhart
- TV announcers (ESPN+): Logan Loving (play–by–play) & Chase Gispert (analyst)

Game information

First Quarter

- UIW – 8:39 Jalen Walthall 41 yard pass from Zach Calzada, Brack Peacock kick
  UIW 7–0 Drive: 7 plays, 78 yards, 2:55
- SLU – 1:31 Riley Callaghan 23 yard field goal
  UIW 7–3 Drive: 15 plays, 81 yards, 7:01

Second Quarter

- SLU – 12:26 Riley Callaghan 46 yard field goal
  UIW 7–6 Drive: 8 plays, 22 yards, 1:20
- UIW – 3:47 Dekalon Taylor 3 yard run, PAT failed
  UIW 13–6 Drive: 13 plays, 75 yards, 8:39
- UIW – 3:022 Marcus Brown 22 yard fumble recovery, Brack Peacock kick
  UIW 20–6
- SLU – 0:21 Errol Rogers Jr. 5 yard pass from Eli Sawyer, Riley Callaghan kick
  UIW 20–13 Drive: 12 plays, 74 yards, 2:33

Third Quarter

- SLU – 8:50 Riley Callaghan 31 yard field goal
  UIW 20–16 Drive: 11 plays, 57 yards, 4:49
- UIW – 1:06 Roy Alexander 36 yard pass from Zach Calzada, Brack Peacock kick
  UIW 27–16 Drive: 4 plays, 55 yards, 1:44
- SLU – 0:51 Brandon Hayes 94 yard kickoff return, Riley Callaghan kick
  UIW 27–23

Fourth Quarter

- UIW – 14:24 Mason Chambers 50 yard interception return, Brack Peacock kick
  UIW 34–23
- SLU – 4:58 Jaylon Domingeaux 10 yard pass from Eli Sawyer, Cade Collier pass
  UIW 34–31 Drive: 8 plays, 71 yards, 2:21

Statistics	UIW	SELA
First downs	18	25
Total yards	63–369	79–341
Rushing yards	32–131	35–112
Passing yards	238	229
Passing: Comp–Att–Int	21–31–0	26–44–2
Time of possession	28:25	31:35

Team	Category	Player	Statistics
Incarnate Word	Passing	Zach Calzada	21/31, 238 yards, 2 TD
Incarnate Word	Rushing	Dekalon Taylor	16 carries, 82 yards, 1 TD
Incarnate Word	Receiving	Logan Compton	2 receptions, 71 yards
Southeastern Louisiana	Passing	Eli Sawyer	25/42, 207 yards, 2 TD, 2 INT
Southeastern Louisiana	Rushing	Antonio Martin Jr.	18 carries, 75 yards
Southeastern Louisiana	Receiving	Jaylon Domingeaux	10 receptions, 97 yards, 1 TD

=== at Lamar ===
Game Ten – Southeastern Louisiana Lions (4–5; 3–1) at Lamar Cardinals (5–3; 2–1)

Quarter	1	2	3	4	OT	Total
Lions	0	7	14	3	6	30
Cardinals	7	7	3	7	3	27

at Provost Umphrey Stadium, Beaumont, Texas

- Date: November 2
- Game time: 3:02 pm
- Game weather: Cloudy Temperature: 82 °F (28 °C) • Wind: SE at 14 miles per hour (23 km/h)
- Game attendance: 5,593
- TV: ESPN+
- Box Score

Game information

First Quarter

- LU – 9:44 Coleman, Robert 35 yd run (Woodard, Ben kick),LU 0–7 Drive: 6 plays, 78 yards, 3:02

Second Quarter

- SLU – 14:07 Pierce, Coryell 50 yd interception,Tied 7–7
- LU – 2:20 Coleman, Robert 4 yd run (Woodard, Ben kick),LU 7–14 Drive: 12 plays, 74 yards, 6:37

Third Quarter

- LU – 9:00 Woodard, Ben 38 yd field goal,LU 7–17 Drive: 7 plays, 19 yards, 2:38
- SLU – 3:29 Martin Jr., Antonio 2 yd run (Callaghan, Riley kick),LU 14–17 Drive: 13 plays, 75 yards, 5:31
- SLU – 0:00 Lewis, Darius 18 yd pass from Sawyer, Eli (Callaghan, Riley kick),SLU 21–17 Drive: 5 plays, 34 yards, 2:34

Fourth Quarter

- LU – 1:18 Fuselier, Kyndon 34 yd pass from Longino, Jakolby (Woodard, Ben kick),LU 21–24 Drive: 9 plays, 62 yards, 4:33
- SLU – 0:00 Callaghan, Riley 37 yd field goal,Tied 24–24 Drive: 13 plays, 51 yards, 1:12

Overtime

- LU – 0:00 Woodard, Ben 30 yd field goal,LU 24–27 Drive: 6 plays, 12 yards, 0:00
- SLU – 0:00 Martin Jr., Antonio 4 yd run ( ),SLU 30–27 Drive: 3 plays, 25 yards, 0:00

Statistics	SELA	LAM
First downs	17	21
Total yards	73–593	70–354
Rushing yards	32–89	47–230
Passing yards	204	124
Passing: Comp–Att–Int	24–41–1	11–23–2
Time of possession	28:06	31:48

Team	Category	Player	Statistics
Southeastern Louisiana	Passing	Eli Sawyer	23/38, 208 yards, 1 TD, 1 INT
Southeastern Louisiana	Rushing	Antonio Martin Jr.	18 carries, 62 yards, 2 TD
Southeastern Louisiana	Receiving	Darius Lewis	7 receptions, 93 yards, 1 TD
Lamar	Passing	Robert Coleman	9/19, 81 yards, 2 INT
Lamar	Rushing	Khalan Griffin	29 carries, 144 yards
Lamar	Receiving	Kyndon Fuselier	4 receptions, 70 yards, 1 TD

=== Northwestern State (rivalry) ===
Game Eleven – Northwestern State Demons (0–9; 0–4) at Southeastern Louisiana Lions (5–5; 4–1)

Quarter	1	2	3	4	Total
Demons	0	0	0	0	0
Lions	14	3	14	10	41

at Strawberry Stadium, Hammond, Louisiana

- Date: November 9
- Game time: 6:00 pm
- Game weather: Cloudy • Temperature: 80 °F (27 °C) • Wind: SE at 14 miles per hour (23 km/h)
- Game attendance: 3,321
- Referee: James Brookhart
- TV announcers (ESPN+): Chase Gispert (play-by-play) and Lucas Hill (analyst)

Game information

First Quarter

- SLU – Brandon Hayes 4-yard pass from Eli Sawyer (Riley Callaghan kick), 8:09. Lions 7–0. Drive: 12 plays, 90 yards, 6:20.
- SLU – Darius Lewis 40-yard pass from Eli Sawyer (Riley Callaghan kick), 1:04. Lions 14–0. Drive: 3 plays, 80 yards, 1:12.

Second Quarter

- SLU – Riley Callaghan 19-yard field goal, 0:29. Lions 17–0. Drive: 4 plays, 3 yards, 0:59.

Third Quarter

- SLU – Rodeo Graham Jr. 6-yard run (Riley Callaghan kick), 10:52. Lions 24–0. Drive: 11 plays, 78 yards, 4:00.
- SLU – Rodeo Graham Jr. 1-yard run (Riley Callaghan kick), 4:03. Lions 31–0. Drive: 12 plays, 58 yards, 5:10.

Fourth Quarter

- SLU – Antonio Martin Jr. 5-yard run (Riley Callaghan kick), 12:06. Lions 38–0. Drive: 8 plays, 51 yards, 4:46.
- SLU – Riley Callaghan 42-yard field goal, 7:41. Lions 41–0. Drive: 4 plays, 1 yard, 1:58.

Statistics	NWST	SELA
First downs	5	21
Total yards	140	424
Rushing yards	22	218
Passing yards	118	206
Passing: Comp–Att–Int	12–19–0	18–26–1
Time of possession	23:28	36:32

Team	Category	Player	Statistics
Northwestern State	Passing	Quaterius Hawkins	12/18, 118 yards
Northwestern State	Rushing	Jeremiah James	5 carries, 10 yards
Northwestern State	Receiving	Kenard King	2 receptions, 42 yards
Southeastern Louisiana	Passing	Eli Sawyer	18/26, 206 yards, 2 TD, INT
Southeastern Louisiana	Rushing	Antonio Martin Jr.	14 carries, 110 yards, TD
Southeastern Louisiana	Receiving	Darius Lewis	4 receptions, 79 yards, TD

=== at Nicholls (River Bell Classic) ===
Game Twelve – Southeastern Louisiana Lions (6–5; 5–1) at Nicholls Colonels (4–7; 2–4)

Quarter	1	2	3	4	Total
Lions	-	-	-	-	0
Colonels	-	-	-	-	0

at Manning Field at John L. Guidry Stadium, Thibodaux, Louisiana

- Date: November 21
- Game time: 6:00 pm
- Game weather: Temperature: 0 °F (−18 °C) • Wind: xx at 0 miles per hour (0 km/h)
- TV: ESPN+

Game information

First Quarter

Second Quarter

Third Quarter

Fourth Quarter

Statistics	SELA	NICH
First downs		
Total yards		
Rushing yards		
Passing yards		
Passing: Comp–Att–Int		
Time of possession		

Team	Category	Player	Statistics
Southeastern Louisiana	Passing		
Southeastern Louisiana	Rushing		
Southeastern Louisiana	Receiving		
Nicholls	Passing		
Nicholls	Rushing		
Nicholls	Receiving		

== Personnel ==
=== Coaching staff ===
Name	Position
Frank Scelfo	Head coach
Anthony Scelfo	Offensive coordinator / quarterbacks coach
Bill D'Ottavio	Defensive coordinator / safeties coach
A.J. Hopp	Offensive line coach / run game coordinator
Ross Jenkins	Assistant head coach / tight ends coach / special teams coordinator
Alvin Slaughter	Wide receivers coach / recruiting coordinator / pass coordinator
Trey Willie	Running backs coach
Dustin Landry	Secondary coach
Antonio Baker	Nickelbacks coach
Tom Rinaldi	Defensive line coach
Trey Nunez	Linebackers coach
David Mertens	Director of player personnel

=== Roster ===
2024 Southeastern Louisiana Lions Football
Quarterbacks: 11 – Damon Stewart – junior (5'11, 170); 14 – Casey Avrard – (redshirt) freshman (6'2, 205); 15 – Tanner Murray – sophomore (6'3, 195); 17 – Eli Sawyer – (redshirt) junior (6'2, 220); 19 – Jamarcus Pittman – freshman (6'3, 220); Running backs: 3 – Harlan Dixon – senior (6'1, 210); 20 – Kimon O'Sullivan – junior (5'11, 180); 22 – Antonio Martin Jr. – sophomore (5'11, 220); 30 – Rodeo Graham Jr. – junior (6'0, 205); 39 – Eugene Foulcard – freshman (5'8, 165); 49 – Jaedon Voisin – TE/RB – freshman (6'2, 240); Wide receivers: 1 – Jaylon Domingeaux – sophomore (6'2, 195); 4 – Brandon Hayes – junior (6'2, 205); 9 – Darius Lewis – (redshirt) senior (5'8, 150); 12 – Errol Rogers – senior (5'11, 195); 16 – Xavier Hill – senior (6'2, 200); 80 – Da'shun Hugley – (redshirt) junior (6'1, 185); 81 – Dkhai Joseph – freshman (5'10, 160); 82 – Corey Lorio – (redshirt) junior (5'10, 170); 83 – Tristan Goodly – (redshirt) freshman (6'0, 170); 84 – Jett Booker – (redshirt) junior (5'11, 195); 86 – Mike Williams – sophomore (5'11, 170); 87 – Darnell O'Quinn – freshman (6'0, 170)	Tight ends: 38 – Ivan Drobocky – senior (6'4, 240); 42 – Beau Perez – freshman (6'5, 220); 85 – Adyn Wilkinson – freshman (6'4, 230); 88 – Seth Adams – junior (6'3, 250); 89 – Cade Collier – (redshirt) junior (6'6, 245); Offensive linemen: 51 – Breland Curry – (redshirt) sophomore (6'2, 295); 52 – Noah Devlin – (redshirt) junior (6'3, 300); 54 – Brockhim Wicks – (redshirt) senior (6'2, 295); 55 – Amiree Alexander – freshman (6'2, 315); 56 – Javin Turner – (redshirt) junior (6'2, 280); 60 – Ilias Rida – (redshirt) freshman (6'7, 270); 61 – Holden Kareokowsky – (redshirt) junior (6'3, 305); 63 – Corin Boudreaux – (redshirt) freshman (6'1, 300); 65 – Riley Whitten – (redshirt) freshman (6'2, 285); 71 – Zane Hooper – sophomore (6'0, 270); 72 – Isaiah Hayes – freshman (6'4, 300); 73 – Jhy Orgeron – senior (6'4, 285); 75 – Blakley Miller – (redshirt) junior (6'5, 300); 76 – Damien Reed – freshman (6'2, 275); 78 – Logan Potter – (redshirt) freshman (6'5, 330); 79 – Ahmad Bradley – junior (6'3, 320)	Defensive linemen: 39 – James Harris – freshman (6'2, 225); 42 – Shemar Pearl – (redshirt) senior (6'6, 255); 44 – Joshua Randall – (redshirt) junior (6'2, 205); 47 – Devaki Williams – sophomore (6'1, 245); 48 – Kaleb Proctor – junior (6'3, 280); 49 – Evan Aubrey – freshman (6'4, 225); 64 – Jacob Dobraska – freshman (6'4, 215); 66 – Carson Dillashaw – (redshirt) freshman (6'6, 255); 90 – Peyton Anderson – sophomore (6'3, 260); 91 – Otto Brewer III – freshman (6'3, 245); 92 – Louis Gendron – freshman (6'3, 280); 93 – Rowan Briggs – junior (6'3, 255); 94 – Nicholas Smith – (redshirt) sophomore (6'3, 315); 95 – Dorian Davis – (redshirt) freshman (6'5, 310); 96 – Dalton Allen – (redshirt) sophomore (6'4, 260); 97 – Tyrin Wise – (redshirt) freshman (6'2, 245); 98 – Austin Kent – (redshirt) senior (5'10, 270); 99 – Charles Hill – (redshirt) senior (6'4, 245); Linebackers: 0 – KK Reno – junior (6'0, 220); 2 – Donte' Daniels – senior (5'11, 195); 22 – Carter Hanberry – freshman (6'0, 200); 26 – Lemar Harris – (redshirt) freshman (6'3, 205); 32 – Kyle Cannon – freshman (6'1, 220); 34 – Brant Monistere – sophomore (5'11, 210); 40 – Jordan Okoye – sophomore (6'1, 215); 43 – Jirrea Johnson Jr. – (redshirt) freshman (5'11, 220); 45 – Warren Peeples – senior (6'2, 220); 46 – Joe Sniffin – junior (6'1, 225); 50 – Stiles Guidry – freshman (6'1, 225); 58 – Kadan Lewis – (redshirt) sophomore (6'1, 270)	Defensive backs: 5 – Shakespeare Louis – junior (6'1, 205); 6 – Ashton Bellaire – freshman (5'10, 190); 6 – Coryell Pierce – senior (5'11, 175); 7 – Blayne Delahoussaye – (redshirt) junior (5'10, 175); 8 – Keydrain Calligan – junior (6'1, 200); 12 – Tre Brown – freshman (5'11, 175); 13 – Cornelius Dyson – senior (6'2, 200); 14 – Ralph Walker – (redshirt) sophomore (5'11, 175); 15 – Richard McKneely – (redshirt) freshman (6'0, 180); 16 – Shea Lee Jr. – (redshirt) freshman (6'0, 165); 19 – Mike Mitchell – (redshirt) freshman (5'11, 180); 20 – Raylon Hill – freshman (6'0, 170); 21 – Rodney Brown Jr. – (redshirt) freshman (6'1, 165); 23 – Raiyen Oatis – freshman (5'11, 175); 24 – Tylon Cooper – sophomore (6'0, 160); 25 – Tyler Mansfield – (redshirt) sophomore (5'11, 168); 27 – Khamron Ford – senior (5'11, 200); 28 – Levi Darensbourg – freshman (6'0, 170); 29 – Zack Vicknair – (redshirt) sophomore (6'0, 205); 31 – Colin Boldt – (redshirt) freshman (6'2, 205); 33 – Justin Dumas – (redshirt) junior (6'1, 205); 36 – Jermaine Davis – freshman (5'10, 165); Placekickers: 69 – Ashton Guilbeau – freshman (6'0, 160); Punters: 41 – Riley Callaghan – K/P – junior (6'3, 190); 47 – Alec Mahler – K/P – (redshirt) sophomore (5'10, 205); 67 – Jack Hunter – (redshirt) freshman (6'3, 200); Long snapper: 68 – Andre Callais Jr. – sophomore (5'9, 175)
Source and player details, 2024 Southeastern Louisiana Lions (7/12/2024):

== Statistics ==
=== Team ===
	Southeastern Louisiana	Opp
Scoring		
Points per game		
Points per Turnovers		
First downs		
Rushing		
Passing		
Penalty		
Rushing yards		
Avg per play		
Avg per game		
Rushing touchdowns		
Passing yards		
Att-Comp-Int		
Avg per pass		
Avg per catch		
Avg per game		
Passing touchdowns		
Total offense		
Plays		
Avg per play		
Avg per game		
Fumbles-Lost		
Penalties-Yards		
Avg per game		

	Southeastern Louisiana	Opp
Punt-Yards		
Avg per play		
Avg per punt net		
Punt Return-Yards		
Avg per punt return		
Kickoffs-Yards		
Avg per play		
Avg per kick net		
Kickoff Return-Yards		
Avg per kickoff return		
Interceptions-Yards		
Avg per play		
Time of possession / game		
3rd down conversions (Pct%)	(0%)	(0%)
4th down conversions (Pct%)	(0%)	(0%)
Touchdowns scored		
Field goals-Attempts		
PAT-Attempts		
2 point conversion-attempts		
Sack by Yards		
Misc Yards		
Safeties		
Onside kicks		
Red zone scores	(0%)	(0%)
Red zone touchdowns	(0%)	(0%)
Attendance		
Date/Avg per date		
Neutral Site		

=== Individual leaders ===
Passing statistics
#	NAME	POS	RAT	CMP-ATT-INT	YDS	AVG/G	CMP%	TD	LONG
		QB	0.0	0-0-0	0 yrds		0.0%	0 TDs	0
	TOTALS		0.0	0-0-0	0 yrds	0.0	0.0%	0 TDs	0

Rushing statistics
#	NAME	POS	ATT	GAIN	AVG	TD	LONG	AVG/G
		RB	0	0 yrds	0.0	0 TDs	0	0.0
	TOTALS		0	0 yrds	0.0	0 TDs	0	0.0

Receiving statistics
#	NAME	POS	CTH	YDS	AVG	TD	LONG	AVG/G
		WR	0	0 yrds	0.0	0 TDs	0	0.0
	TOTALS		67	730 yrds	10.9	10 TDs	38	243.3

==== Defense ====
Defense statistics
#	NAME	POS	SOLO	AST	TOT	TFL-YDS	SACK-YDS	INT-YDS-TD	BU	QBH	RCV-YDS	FF	BLK	SAF
			0	0	0	0-0 yrds	0-0 yrds	-	-	-	-	-	-	-
	TOTAL		0	0	0	0-0 yrds	0-0 yrds	0-0 yrds- 0 TDs	0	0	-	0	0	-

Key: POS: Position, SOLO: Solo Tackles, AST: Assisted Tackles, TOT: Total Tackles, TFL: Tackles-for-loss, SACK: Quarterback Sacks, INT: Interceptions, BU: Passes Broken Up, PD: Passes Defended, QBH: Quarterback Hits, FR: Fumbles Recovered, FF: Forced Fumbles, BLK: Kicks or Punts Blocked, SAF: Safeties, TD : Touchdown

==== Special teams ====
Kicking/off statistics
#	NAME	POS	XPM-XPA (XP%)	FGM-FGA (FG%)	1–19	20–29	30–39	40–49	50+	PTS	LNG	KICKS	YDS	AVG	TB	OB
		PK	0-0 (0.0%)	0-0 (0.0%)	-/-	-/-	-/-	-/-	-/-	0 pts	0	0	0 yrds	0.0	0	-
	TOTALS		0-0 (0.0%)	0-0 (0.0%)	-/-	-/-	-/-	-/-	-/-	0	0	0	0 yrds	0.0	0	-

Punting statistics
#	NAME	POS	PUNTS	YDS	AVG	LONG	TB	FC	I–20	50+	BLK
		P	-	-	-	-	-	-	-	-	-
	Team	--	0	-	-	-	-	-	-	-	0
	TOTALS		0	0 yrds	0.0	0	0	0	0	0	1

Kick return statistics
#	NAME	POS	RTNS	YDS	AVG	TD	LNG
			-	-	-	-	-
	TOTALS		0	0 yrds	0.0	0 TD's	0

Punt return statistics
#	NAME	POS	RTNS	YDS	AVG	TD	LONG
			-	-	-	-	-
	TOTALS		0	0 yrds	0.0	0 TD's	0

== Conference awards and honors ==
=== Weekly awards ===
Weekly honors
Honors	Player	Position	Date Awarded	Ref.
SLC Defensive Player of the Week				
