= KWCL-FM =

- Oak Grove, Louisiana; United States
- Frequency: 96.7 MHz
- Branding: Mix 96.7

Programming
- Format: Hot adult contemporary

Ownership
- Owner: Holland Entertainment; (Holland Broadcasting, LLC)

History
- Founded: 1958 (with the establishment of KWCL (1280 AM))
- First air date: February 1, 1973; 53 years ago
- Former call signs: KWCL-FM (1973–1975); KDDI (1975–1978)
- Call sign meaning: "West Carroll, Louisiana"

Technical information
- Licensing authority: FCC
- Facility ID: 35878
- Class: C3
- ERP: 40,000 watts
- HAAT: 104 meters
- Transmitter coordinates: 32°51′32″N 91°21′23″W

Links
- Public license information: Public file; LMS
- Webcast: Listen Live
- Website: kwclfm.com

KWCL-FM (96.7 MHz) is an American radio station licensed by the FCC to serve Oak Grove, Louisiana, in West Carroll Parish in the northeastern portion of the state.

The license is assigned to Holland Broadcasting, LLC, a division of Holland Entertainment.

== History ==
On February 23, 1957, Carroll Broadcasting Company applied to the Federal Communications Commission (FCC) for a new radio station in Oak Grove. It was awarded 1280 kHz as a 500-watt, daytime-only operation on April 16, 1958. KWCL, named for its parish, began broadcasting on August 15, 1958.

Irene Robinson's husband, "Poison" Ivy Robinson, co-owned the station with David Blossman from 1969 to 1980. During this time, the station obtained an FM construction permit and signed on what was originally known as KWCL-FM on February 1, 1973. The station adopted its own programming as KDDI in March 1975 with a taped gospel format but reverted to the KWCL-FM designation in 1978. When Blossman died in 1980, the station was sold, and Ivy Robinson moved to Shreveport.

In February 1984, an application was filed to transfer the license from Baker Broadcasting to Heart of Dixie Broadcasting Corp, owned by Bennett Strange.

Irene Robinson has owned KWCL since 1990 after she repurchased the station along with other partners that she later bought out. The AM station was off the air by 1991.

On March 23, 2022, the station was sold to Adam Holland of Holland Entertainment, which also operates the Fiske Theatre in Oak Grove. On June 1, the FCC transferred the license to Holland Broadcasting, LLC, ending the Robinson family's 40-plus year affiliation with the station. In anticipation of the sale, the station flipped to hot adult contemporary as "Mix 96.7" in January 2023.
