= Kenny Hill (defensive back) =

American football player (born 1958)

No. 48, 41
- Position: Safety

Personal information
- Born: July 25, 1958 (age 68); Oak Grove, Louisiana, U.S.
- Listed height: 6 ft 0 in (1.83 m)
- Listed weight: 194 lb (88 kg)

Career information
- High school: Oak Grove
- College: Yale
- NFL draft: 1980: 8th round, 194th overall pick

Career history
- Oakland / Los Angeles Raiders (1980–1983); New York Giants (1984–1988); Kansas City Chiefs (1989)

Awards and highlights
- 3× Super Bowl champion (XV, XVIII, XXI); First-team All-Ivy (1979); Second-team All-Ivy (1978)

Career NFL statistics
- Interceptions: 7
- Sacks: 3
- Fumble recoveries: 8
- Stats at Pro Football Reference

Kenneth Wayne Hill (born July 25, 1958) is an American former professional football player whose career lasted ten seasons in the National Football League (NFL), from 1980 until 1989. Hill played for the Oakland/Los Angeles Raiders, New York Giants, and Kansas City Chiefs and earned three Super Bowl rings, the first two with the 1980 and 1983 Raiders, the third with the 1986 New York Giants. Hill is the first and only Ivy League football athlete to have played on three Super Bowl championship teams.

Hill played college football at Yale University, coached by College Football Hall of Fame member Carmen Cozza. Hill lettered three years, amassing 1594 rushing yards on 356 carries. He gained 910 yards rushing his junior year and returned kickoffs and punts on special teams during three varsity seasons. Hill was named to the 1979 All-Ivy League First-team and 1978 All-Ivy League Second-team. Hill majored in Molecular Biophysics and Biochemistry.

Hill had signed a letter of intent to play football at Louisiana State for Charlie McClendon, another member of the College Football Hall of Fame. Hill was recruited by LSU to play defensive back. "I can't blame him for going to Yale. He's very bright," McClendon remarked. Hill turned down football scholarship offers from, among others, the football programs at Baylor, Mississippi, Mississippi State, and Tulane.

Hill, a varsity track letterwinner at Yale for Coach Lee Calhoun, had been timed at 4.46 in the forty yard dash, and 9.7 in the 100 yard dash in college. Calhoun thought Hill could run a 9.5 in the 100 if he concentrated on track.

Hill, like former Yale football athletes Don Martin, Dick Jauron and fellow Super Bowl champion Gary Fencik, converted successfully to defensive back in the NFL from running back or wide receiver.
