= Senator Adcock =

Senator Adcock may refer to:

- Gale Adcock (born 1954), North Carolina State Senate
- Jamar Adcock (1917–1991), Louisiana State Senate
