= National Register of Historic Places listings in West Carroll Parish, Louisiana =

Location of West Carroll Parish in Louisiana

This is a list of the National Register of Historic Places listings in West Carroll Parish, Louisiana.

This is intended to be a complete list of the properties on the National Register of Historic Places in West Carroll Parish, Louisiana, United States. The locations of National Register properties for which the latitude and longitude coordinates are included below, may be seen in a map.

There are 4 properties listed on the National Register in the parish.

This National Park Service list is complete through NPS recent listings posted May 22, 2026.

== Current listings ==
| | Name on the Register | Image | Date listed | Location | City or town | Description |
|---|---|---|---|---|---|---|
| 1 | Fiske Theatre | Fiske Theatre | January 29, 2014 (#13001130) | 306 E. Main St. 32°51′40″N 91°23′15″W | Oak Grove | |
| 2 | Oak Grove Community House | Oak Grove Community House | January 26, 2016 (#15001006) | 414 James St. 32°51′54″N 91°23′05″W | Oak Grove | |
| 3 | Oak Grove Historic District | | May 26, 2026 (#100011955) | E Main Street, roughly bounded by E. Jefferson Street, Johnson Street, Marietta Street and N. Front Street; 32°51′39″N 91°23′18″W | Oak Grove | |
| 4 | Poverty Point National Monument | Poverty Point National Monument | October 15, 1966 (#66000382) | 32°38′12″N 91°24′41″W | Epps | A UNESCO World Heritage Site: the type site for the Poverty Point culture, a large complex of earthworks built between 1650 and 700 BCE, during the Archaic period. The site has six large concentric curving earthworks and several large mounds. |

== See also ==
- List of National Historic Landmarks in Louisiana
- National Register of Historic Places listings in Louisiana
