= Spencer Myrick =

American politician (1918–1991)

Willie Spencer Myrick

Louisiana State Senator for West Carroll Parish
- In office 1964–1968
- Preceded by: William T. Carpenter
- Succeeded by: Jamar Adcock

Louisiana State Representative for West Carroll Parish
- In office 1956–1960
- Preceded by: Lonnie Richmond
- Succeeded by: Lonnie Richmond

Personal details
- Born: November 23, 1918 Simpson County; Mississippi, USA
- Died: November 24, 1991 (aged 73) Baton Rouge, Louisiana
- Party: Democratic
- Spouse: Marie Gammill Myrick
- Children: Jimmy Myrick; Ronnie Myrick
- Occupation: Farmer

Willie Spencer Myrick, known as W. Spencer Myrick (November 23, 1918 – November 24, 1991), was a conservative Democratic member of both houses of the Louisiana State Legislature for West Carroll Parish in northeastern Louisiana.

== Political life ==
Myrick first entered state politics as an elected member of the House of Representatives, having served from 1956 to 1960 during the final administration of Governor Earl Kemp Long. During the following second administration of Governor Jimmie Davis, Myrick was an investigator for the Louisiana Sovereignty Commission. Voelker ran in the 1963 Democratic gubernatorial primary but polled few votes. In that same election, Myrick was nominated and then elected without opposition to the Louisiana State Senate. He served a single term from 1964 to 1968. Myrick also worked periodically as an aide to Governor Earl Long, a confidant and friend.

After his legislative years, Myrick and his wife, the former Marie Gammill (May 13, 1918–June 19, 1998) resided in Baton Rouge, where Myrick died.

== See also ==
| Preceded by William T. Carpenter | Louisiana State Senator for West Carroll Parish; Willie Spencer Myrick; 1964–1968 | Succeeded by Jamar William Adcock |
| Preceded by Lonnie Richmond | Louisiana State Representative for West Carroll Parish; Willie Spencer Myrick; 1956–1960 | Succeeded by Lonnie Richmond |
