= Oak Grove Community House =

- U.S. National Register of Historic Places
- Location within Louisiana Location within the United States
- Location: 414 James St, Oak Grove, Louisiana
- Coordinates: 32°51′54″N 91°23′05″W
- Built: 1932-33
- Built by: Civil Works Administration
- Architectural style: Rustic
- NRHP reference No.: 15001006
- Added to NRHP: January 26, 2016

The Oak Grove Community House in Oak Grove, Louisiana, also known as Oak Grove Legion Hut, was listed on the National Register of Historic Places in 2016. The listing includes a Rustic-style Civil Works Administration-built American Legion hut and a park. The hut was built in 1932–33.

== See also ==
- List of American Legion buildings
- National Register of Historic Places listings in West Carroll Parish, Louisiana
