= Kilbourne High School =

Kilbourne High School may refer to:

- Kilbourne High School (Louisiana) - Kilbourne, Louisiana
- Worthington Kilbourne High School - Columbus, Ohio
