= West Carroll Parish Detention Center =

Jail in Epps, Louisiana

- Interactive map of West Carroll Parish Detention Center
- Location: Epps, Louisiana; 32°35′56″N 91°29′02″W
- Status: Closed
- Closed: 2012

West Carroll Parish Detention Center was a privately operated jail in Epps, Louisiana, managed by Emerald Correctional Management. In 2007, it was described as a medium-security facility with capacity for more than 700 prisoners.

== History ==
In July 2007, Harris County, Texas, began transferring inmates to the facility to address staffing requirements at its jail. The county authorized up to $4 million to house as many as 400 prisoners in Epps over six months. The transfers prompted concerns among residents and local officials about security and access to information.

In October 2012, the Louisiana Department of Corrections transferred 73 of the 732 state inmates housed at the detention center to Elayn Hunt Correctional Center following a search for contraband. Department spokeswoman Pam LaBorde said about 60 officers participated in the operation.

The detention center was closed in 2012.
