= Kilbourne, Louisiana =

Kilbourne
- Village
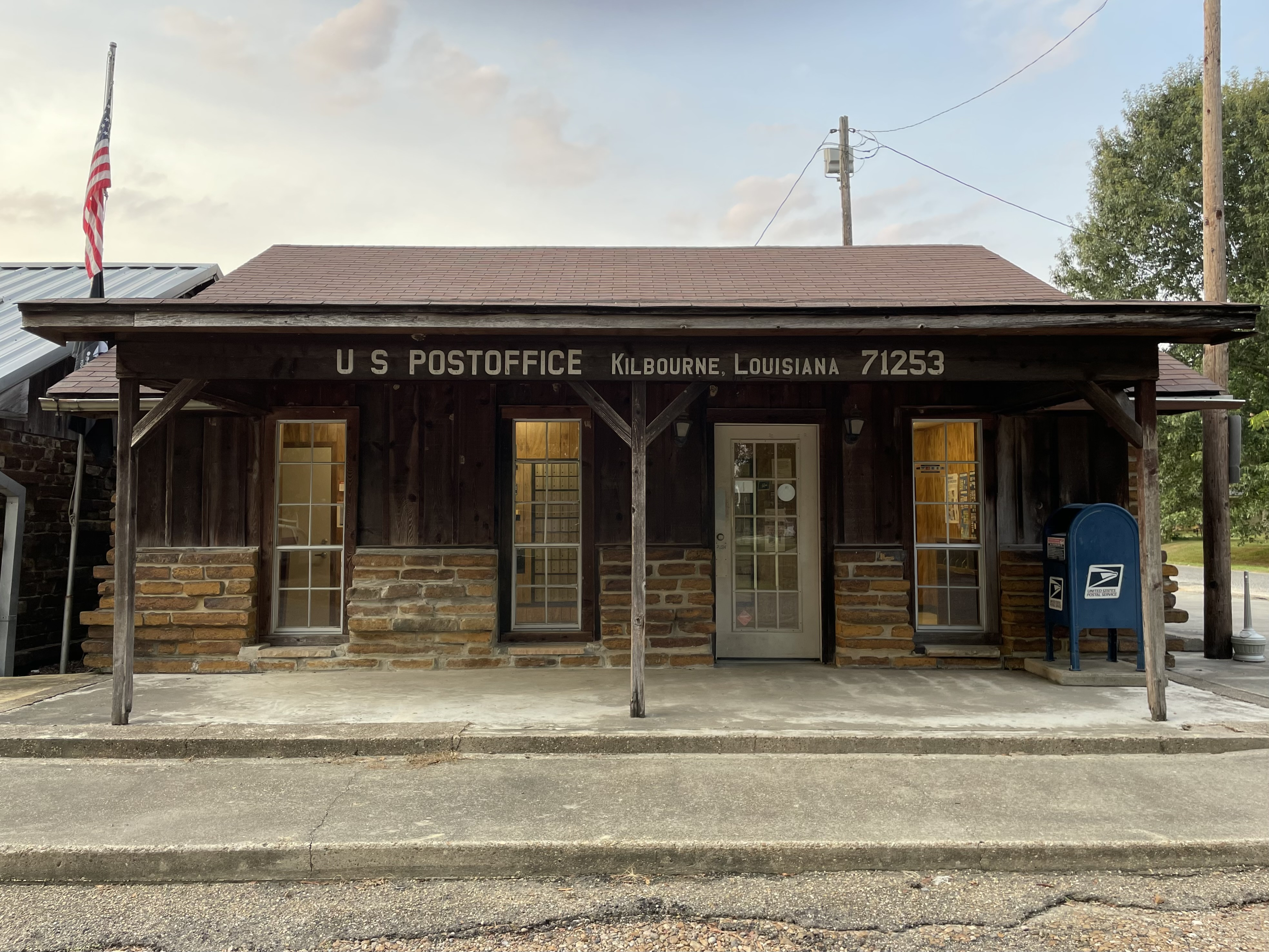
- Kilbourne Post Office

- Location of Kilbourne in West Carroll Parish, Louisiana.

- Location of Louisiana in the United States

- Location of Kilbourne within Louisiana
- Coordinates: 33°00′04″N 91°18′50″W
- Country: United States
- State: Louisiana
- Parish: West Carroll

Area
  - Total: 1.39 sq mi (3.59 km^{2})
  - Land: 1.39 sq mi (3.59 km^{2})
  - Water: 0 sq mi (0.00 km^{2})
- Elevation: 125 ft (38 m)

Population (2020)
  - Total: 351
  - Density: 253/sq mi (97.8/km^{2})
- Time zone: UTC-6 (CST)
  - Summer (DST): UTC-5 (CDT)
- Area code: 318
- FIPS code: 22-39650
- GNIS feature ID: 2407485

Kilbourne is a village in West Carroll Parish, Louisiana, United States. As of the 2020 census, Kilbourne had a population of 351.

== History ==
Not much is known about Kilbourne's early history, but it is believed that the community arose with the establishment of West Carroll Parish in 1877.

Kilbourne was incorporated as a village in 1954.

== Geography ==
According to the United States Census Bureau, the village has a total area of 1.4 square miles (3.6 km^{2}), all land.

== Demographics ==
Historical population
Census	Pop.	Note	%±
1960	227		—
1970	370		63.0%
1980	286		−22.7%
1990	409		43.0%
2000	436		6.6%
2010	416		−4.6%
2020	351		−15.6%
2025 (est.)	327	▼	−6.8%
U.S. Decennial Census

As of the census of 2000, there were 436 people, 168 households, and 124 families residing in the village. The population density was 319.8 inhabitants per square mile (123.5/km^{2}). There were 185 housing units at an average density of 135.7 per square mile (52.4/km^{2}). The racial makeup of the village was 98.62% White, 0.69% African American, 0.46% Native American, 0.23% from other races. Hispanic or Latino of any race were 1.15% of the population.

There were 168 households, out of which 38.7% had children under the age of 18 living with them, 60.1% were married couples living together, 11.9% had a female householder with no husband present, and 25.6% were non-families. 21.4% of all households were made up of individuals, and 13.1% had someone living alone who was 65 years of age or older. The average household size was 2.60 and the average family size was 3.02.

In the village, the population was spread out, with 31.2% under the age of 18, 6.4% from 18 to 24, 25.0% from 25 to 44, 24.8% from 45 to 64, and 12.6% who were 65 years of age or older. The median age was 37 years. For every 100 females, there were 79.4 males. For every 100 females age 18 and over, there were 84.0 males.

The median income for a household in the village was $25,536, and the median income for a family was $34,250. Males had a median income of $39,250 versus $23,250 for females. The per capita income for the village was $13,374. About 16.0% of families and 19.9% of the population were below the poverty line, including 22.3% of those under age 18 and 25.0% of those age 65 or over.

== Education ==
Public schools in West Carroll Parish are operated by the West Carroll Parish School Board. The village of Kilbourne is zoned to Oak Grove High School (Grades 7-12) after Kilbourne High School closed in 2023. Kilbourne High School became Kilbourne Elementary, serving students of Grades K-6.

== Notable person ==
- Ira Gordon, American football player.
