= Kaleb Proctor =

American football player (born 2004)

No. 94 – Arizona Cardinals
- Position: Defensive tackle
- Roster status: Injured reserve

Personal information
- Born: April 26, 2004 (age 22)
- Listed height: 6 ft 2 in (1.88 m)
- Listed weight: 291 lb (132 kg)

Career information
- High school: Oak Grove (Oak Grove, Louisiana)
- College: Southeastern Louisiana (2022–2025)
- NFL draft: 2026: 4th round, 104th overall pick

Career history
- Arizona Cardinals (2026–present)

Awards and highlights
- First-team FCS All-American (2025); Southland Defensive Player of the Year (2025); First-team All-Southland (2025)
- Stats at Pro Football Reference

Kaleb Proctor (born April 26, 2004) is an American professional football defensive tackle for the Arizona Cardinals of the National Football League (NFL). He played college football for the Southeastern Louisiana Lions and he was selected by the Cardinals in the fourth round of the 2026 NFL draft.

== Early life ==
Proctor attended Oak Grove High School located in Oak Grove, Louisiana. Coming out of high school, he was unranked by 247Sports, and held no FBS offers, but committed to play college football for the Southeastern Louisiana Lions.

== College career ==
As a freshman in 2022, Proctor put up 16 tackles with two being for a loss, and a sack in 12 games.

In the 2023 season, he became a starter, recording 26 tackles and a sack and a half.

During the 2024 season, Proctor had a breakout season, totaling 49 tackles with six going for a loss, and four and a half sacks, earning second-team all-conference honors.

In week four of the 2025 season, he tallied three tackles for loss and two sacks in a loss versus LSU. During the 2025 season, Proctor played in all 13 games, recording 43 tackles with 13 being for a loss, and nine sacks. For his performance he earned first-team all-Southland honors, first-team FCS all-American honors, and was named the Southland Conference Player of the Year. After the conclusion of the 2025 season, Proctor declared for the 2026 NFL draft, while also accepting an invite to the 2026 East-West Shrine Bowl. He also accepted an invite to the 2026 NFL Scouting Combine.

== Professional career ==
Pre-draft measurables
Height	Weight	Arm length	Hand span	Wingspan	40-yard dash	10-yard split	20-yard split	20-yard shuttle	Vertical jump	Broad jump
6 ft 1 7/8 in (1.88 m)	291 lb (132 kg)	33 in (0.84 m)	9 1/2 in (0.24 m)	6 ft 7 3/4 in (2.03 m)	4.79 s	1.68 s	2.79 s	4.71 s	33.0 in (0.84 m)	9 ft 5 in (2.87 m)
All values from NFL Combine

Proctor was selected by the Arizona Cardinals in the fourth round with the 104th overall pick of the 2026 NFL draft. On June 10, 2026, during an OTA practice, Proctor tore his meniscus. On July 22, the Cardinals placed Proctor on injured reserve, sidelining him for his entire rookie season.
