= Jake Jones (baseball) =

American baseball player and World War II flying ace (1920–2000)

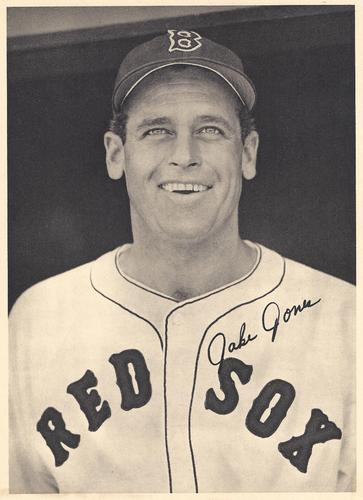
- First baseman
- Born: November 23, 1920; Epps, Louisiana, U.S.
- Died: December 13, 2000 (aged 80); Epps, Louisiana, U.S.
- Batted: Right Threw: Right

MLB debut
- September 20, 1941, for the Chicago White Sox

Last MLB appearance
- September 19, 1948, for the Boston Red Sox

MLB statistics
- Batting average: .229
- Home runs: 23
- Runs batted in: 117

Teams
- Chicago White Sox (1941–1942, 1946–1947); Boston Red Sox (1947–1948)

James Murrell "Jake" Jones (November 23, 1920 – December 13, 2000) was an American professional baseball first baseman in Major League Baseball who played between 1941 and 1948 for the Chicago White Sox (1941–42, 1946–47) and Boston Red Sox (1947–48). Listed at 6'3", 197 lb., Jones batted and threw right-handed. He was born in Epps, Louisiana.

== Career ==
Jones was a highly decorated World War II veteran. He played 10 games in the American League for Chicago, in part of two seasons, before enlisting in the United States Navy right after the attack on Pearl Harbor. He joined the service on June 30, 1942, becoming an aviator. In November 1943, he was assigned as a fighter pilot on the USS Yorktown (CV-10), flying Grumman F6F Hellcat.

Between November and December 1944, Jones destroyed two Japanese A6M Zero fighters and damaged another. On February 1, 1945, he shot down another three Zeroes while serving on a mission at northeast of Tokyo, to give him five confirmed victories. A day later, he destroyed other Zero and a Nakajima Ki-43. Then, on February 25 he received a half-share of a probable Ki-43.

Jones was awarded the Silver Star, two Distinguished Flying Crosses and four Air Medals.

Following his service discharge, Jones returned to play for Chicago in 1946. During the 1947 midseason he was dealt to the Boston Red Sox in exchange for Rudy York, batting a combined .237 with 19 home runs and 96 RBI that season. He hit .200 in 36 games for Boston in 1948, his last major league season, and finished his baseball career in 1949, dividing his playing time between the Texas League and American Association.

Jones died in his hometown of Epps, Louisiana at age 80.
