= Forest, Louisiana =

Village of Forest
- Village
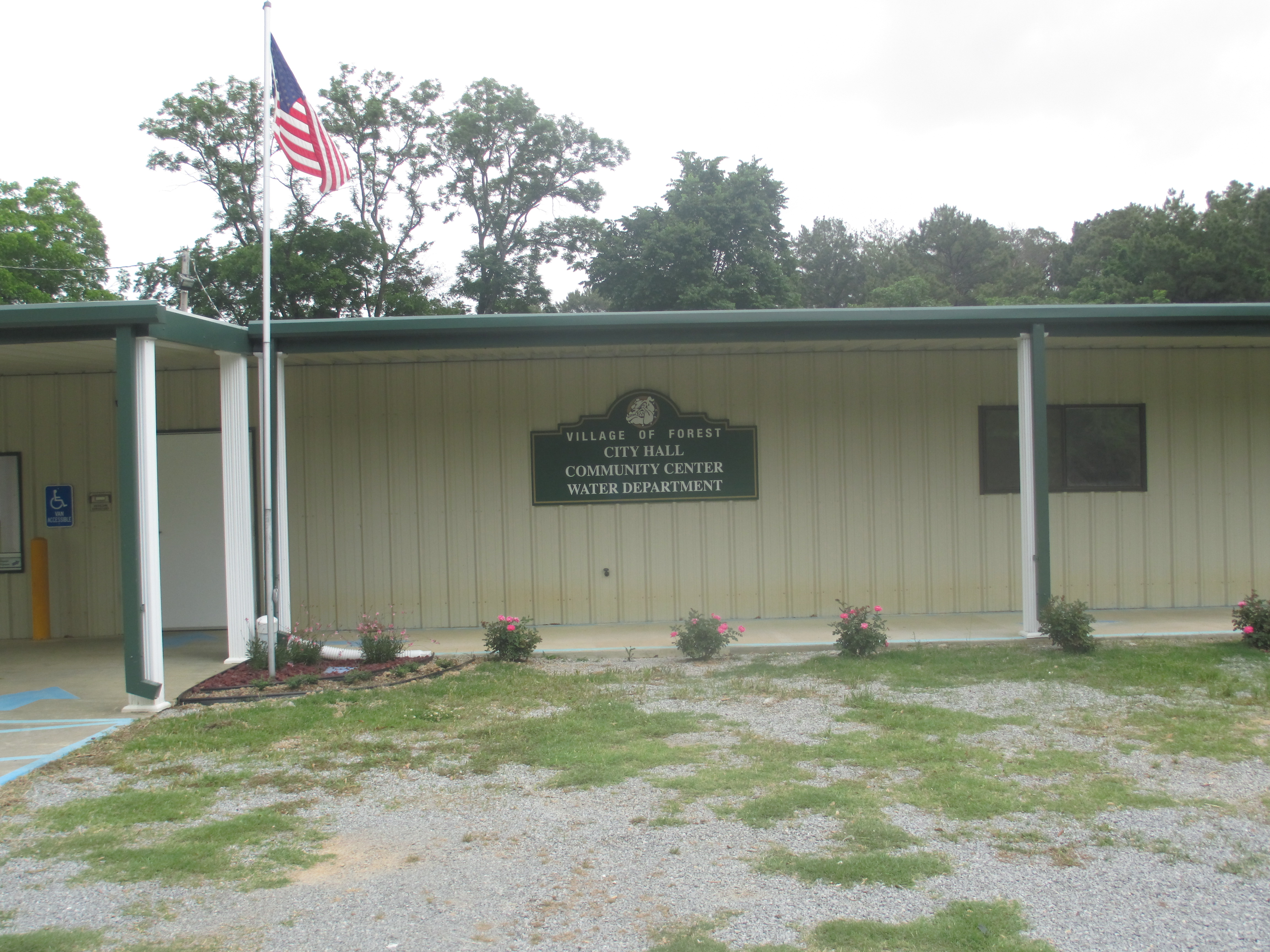
- Forest City Hall and Community Center

- Location of Forest in West Carroll Parish, Louisiana.

- Location of Louisiana in the United States
- Coordinates: 32°47′33″N 91°24′45″W
- Country: United States
- State: Louisiana
- Parish: West Carroll

Area
  - Total: 1.67 sq mi (4.33 km^{2})
  - Land: 1.67 sq mi (4.33 km^{2})
  - Water: 0 sq mi (0.00 km^{2})
- Elevation: 128 ft (39 m)

Population (2020)
  - Total: 304
  - Density: 181.9/sq mi (70.23/km^{2})
- Time zone: UTC-6 (CST)
  - Summer (DST): UTC-5 (CDT)
- Area code: 318
- FIPS code: 22-26350
- GNIS feature ID: 2407457

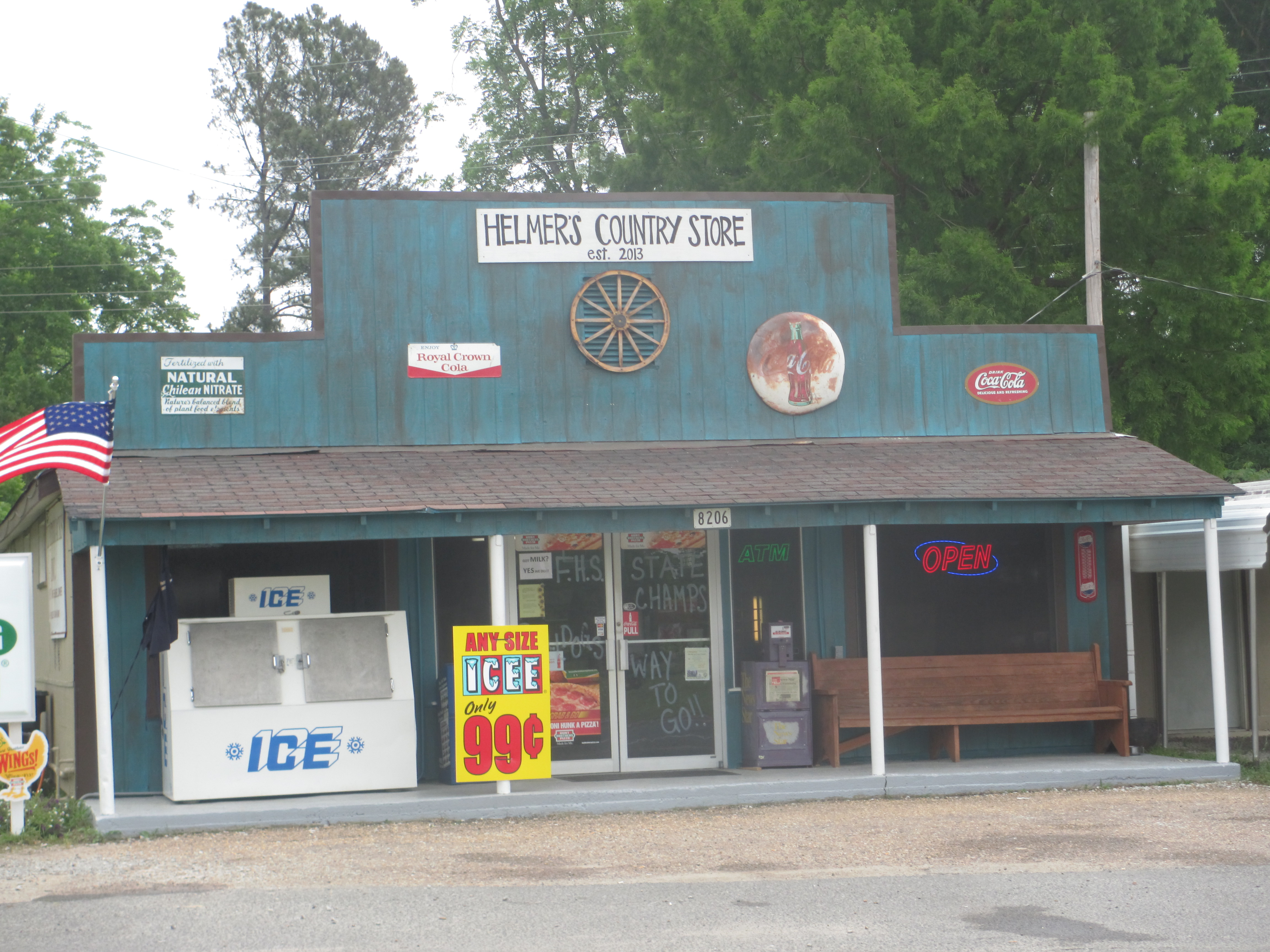
Helmer's Country Store, established in an old building in Forest in 2013

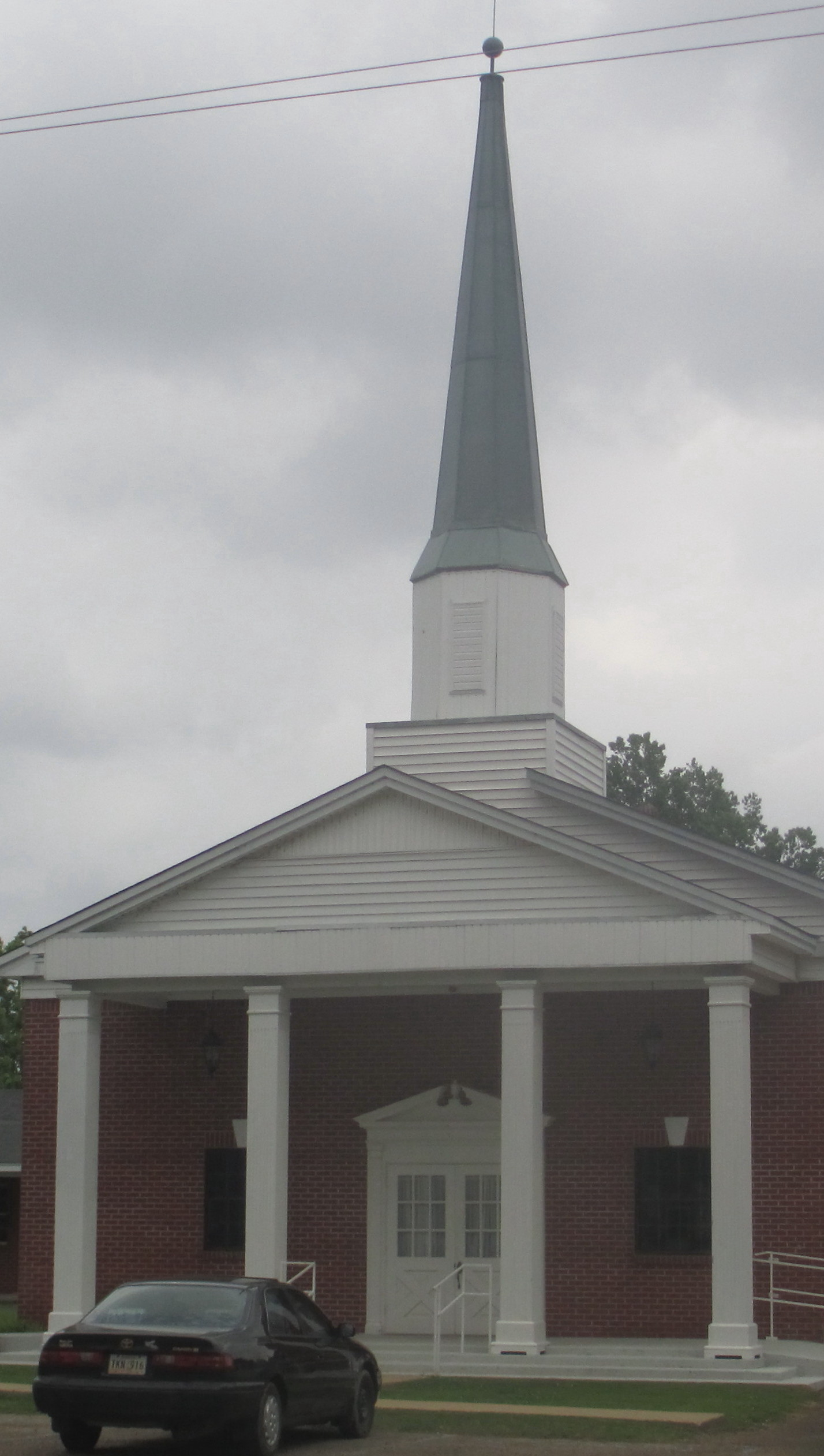
Forest Baptist Church at 138 Clover Street

Forest is a village in West Carroll Parish in northeastern Louisiana, United States. As of the 2020 census, Forest had a population of 304.

Forest Police Chief James Robert "Bob" Smith (Independent; born June 1931), with service since 1998 is the oldest elected official in the State of Louisiana, as of 2017. After thirty years as a mechanic for the United States Air Force, Smith began a civilian career with International Oil Company, based in Saudi Arabia. A North Carolina native, he retired to Forest, where his wife had formerly resided.

== Geography ==
According to the United States Census Bureau, the village has a total area of 1.7 square miles (4.4 km^{2}), all land.

== Demographics ==
Historical population
Census	Pop.	Note	%±
1970	221		—
1980	299		35.3%
1990	263		−12.0%
2000	275		4.6%
2010	355		29.1%
2020	304		−14.4%
2025 (est.)	285	▼	−6.2%
U.S. Decennial Census

As of the census of 2000, there were 275 people, 95 households, and 83 families residing in the village. The population density was 165.5 inhabitants per square mile (63.9/km^{2}). There were 108 housing units at an average density of 65.0 per square mile (25.1/km^{2}). The racial makeup of the village was 95.27% White, 1.82% African American, 2.91% from other races. Hispanic or Latino of any race were 4.00% of the population.

There were 95 households, out of which 38.9% had children under the age of 18 living with them, 76.8% were married couples living together, 8.4% had a female householder with no husband present, and 12.6% were non-families. 10.5% of all households were made up of individuals, and 5.3% had someone living alone who was 65 years of age or older. The average household size was 2.89 and the average family size was 3.10.

In the village, the population was spread out, with 30.5% under the age of 18, 6.2% from 18 to 24, 27.6% from 25 to 44, 24.7% from 45 to 64, and 10.9% who were 65 years of age or older. The median age was 37 years. For every 100 females, there were 93.7 males. For every 100 females age 18 and over, there were 94.9 males.

The median income for a household in the village was $35,000, and the median income for a family was $36,875. Males had a median income of $26,786 versus $13,750 for females. The per capita income for the village was $13,191. About 6.0% of families and 10.5% of the population were below the poverty line, including 16.3% of those under the age of eighteen and 6.9% of those 65 or over.

== Education ==
Public schools are operated by the West Carroll Parish School Board. The village of Forest is zoned to Forest High School (Grades PK-12), which is located off the main highway at 158 Clover Street adjacent to the Forest Baptist Church.

In May 2013, the Forest High School Bulldogs baseball team was ranked first in the state among the Class B schools.

Vance McAllister, who represented Louisiana's 5th congressional district in the United States House of Representatives from 2013 to 2014, graduated from Forest High School.
