= West Carroll Parish, Louisiana =

Parish in Louisiana, United States

West Carroll Parish
- Parish
- Parish of West Carroll; Paroisse de Carroll Ouest (French)
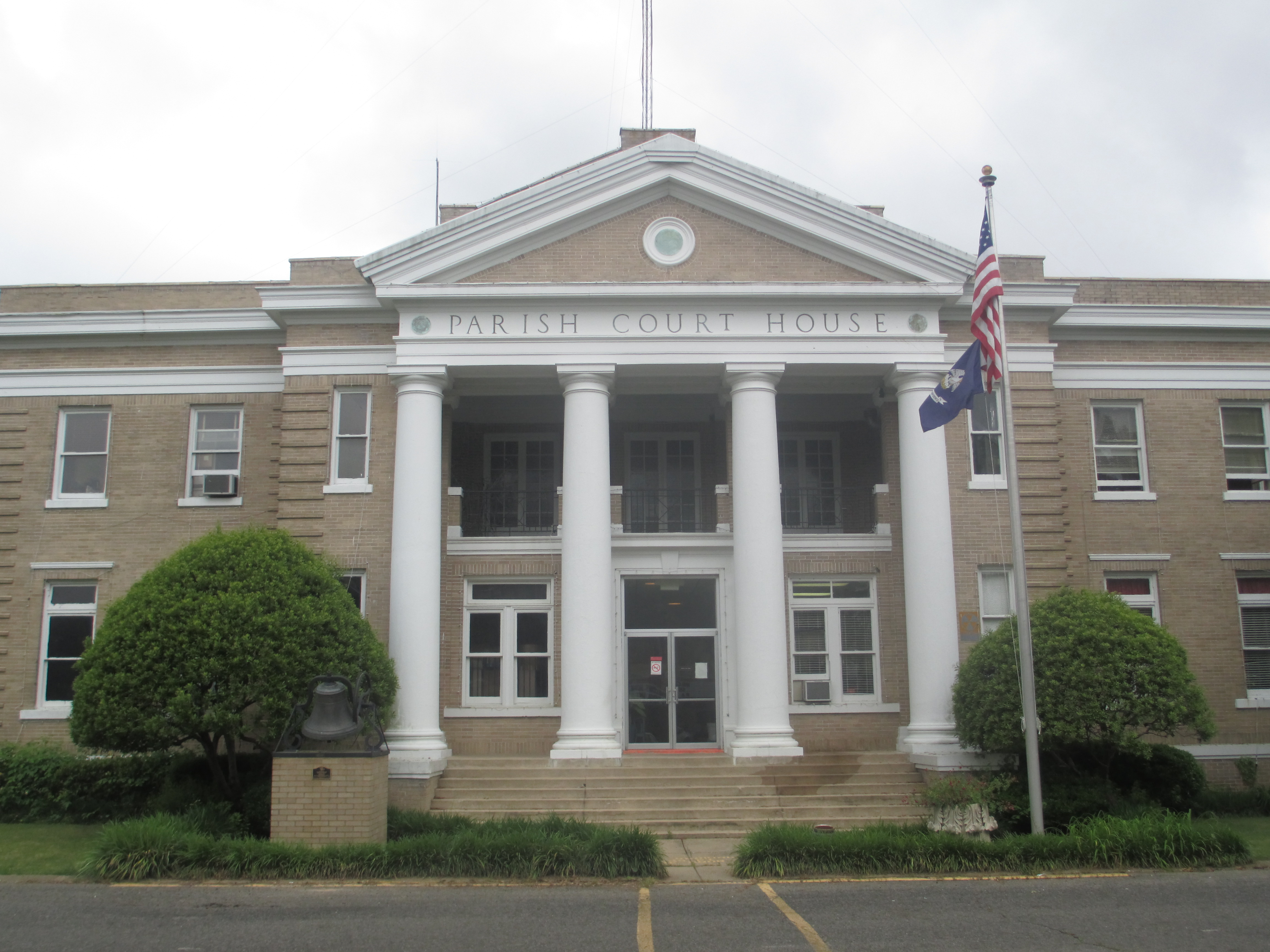
- West Carroll Parish Courthouse in Oak Grove

- Location within the U.S. state of Louisiana
- Coordinates: 32°47′N 91°27′W
- Country: United States
- State: Louisiana
- Founded: March 26, 1877
- Named for: Charles Carroll of Carrollton
- Seat: Oak Grove
- Largest town: Oak Grove

Area
  - Total: 361 sq mi (930 km^{2})
  - Land: 360 sq mi (930 km^{2})
  - Water: 0.9 sq mi (2.3 km^{2}) 0.3%

Population (2020)
  - Total: 9,751
  - Estimate (2025): 9,156 ▼
  - Density: 27/sq mi (10/km^{2})
- Time zone: UTC−6 (Central)
  - Summer (DST): UTC−5 (CDT)
- Congressional district: 5th

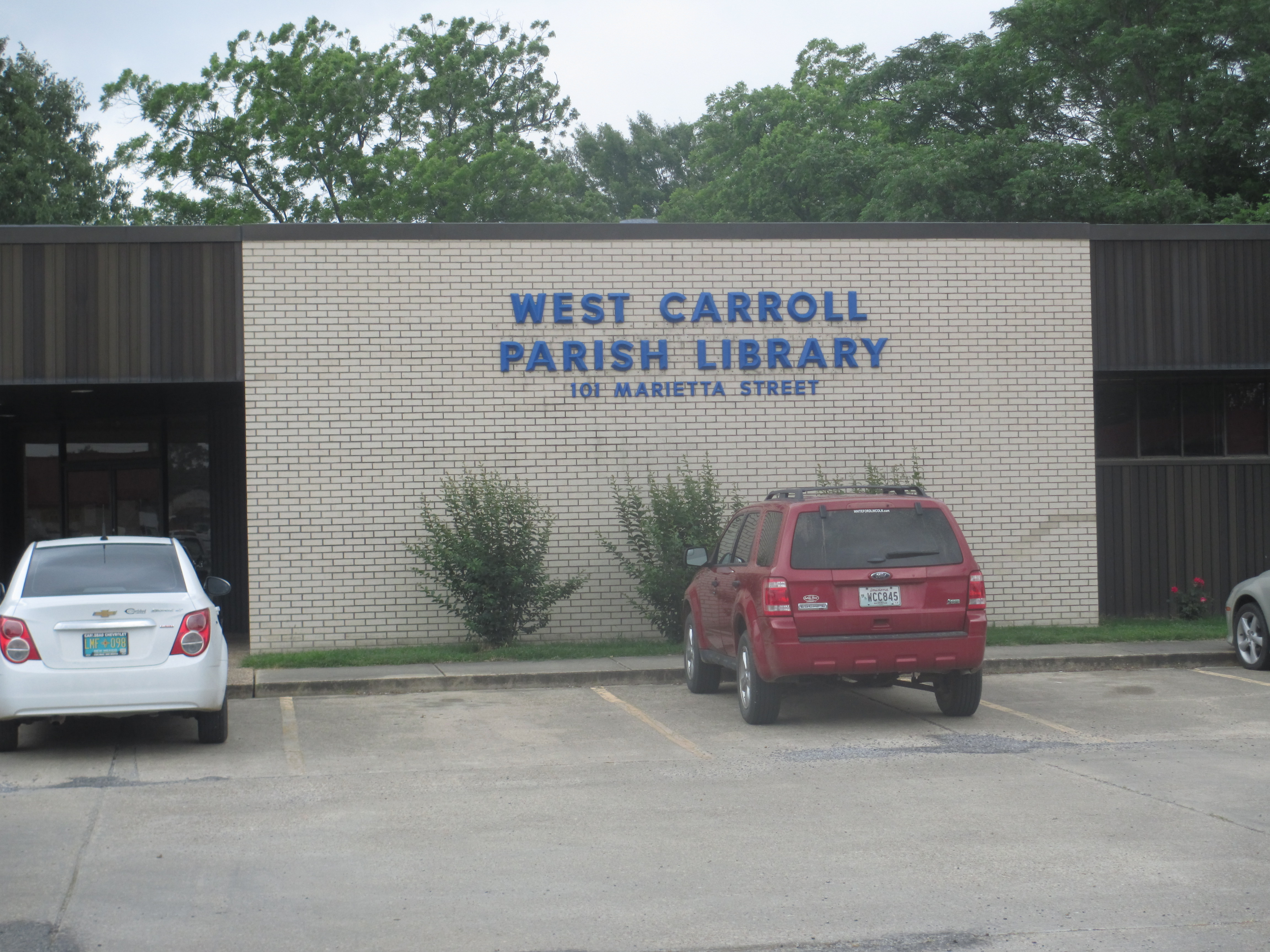
The West Carroll Parish Library in Oak Grove

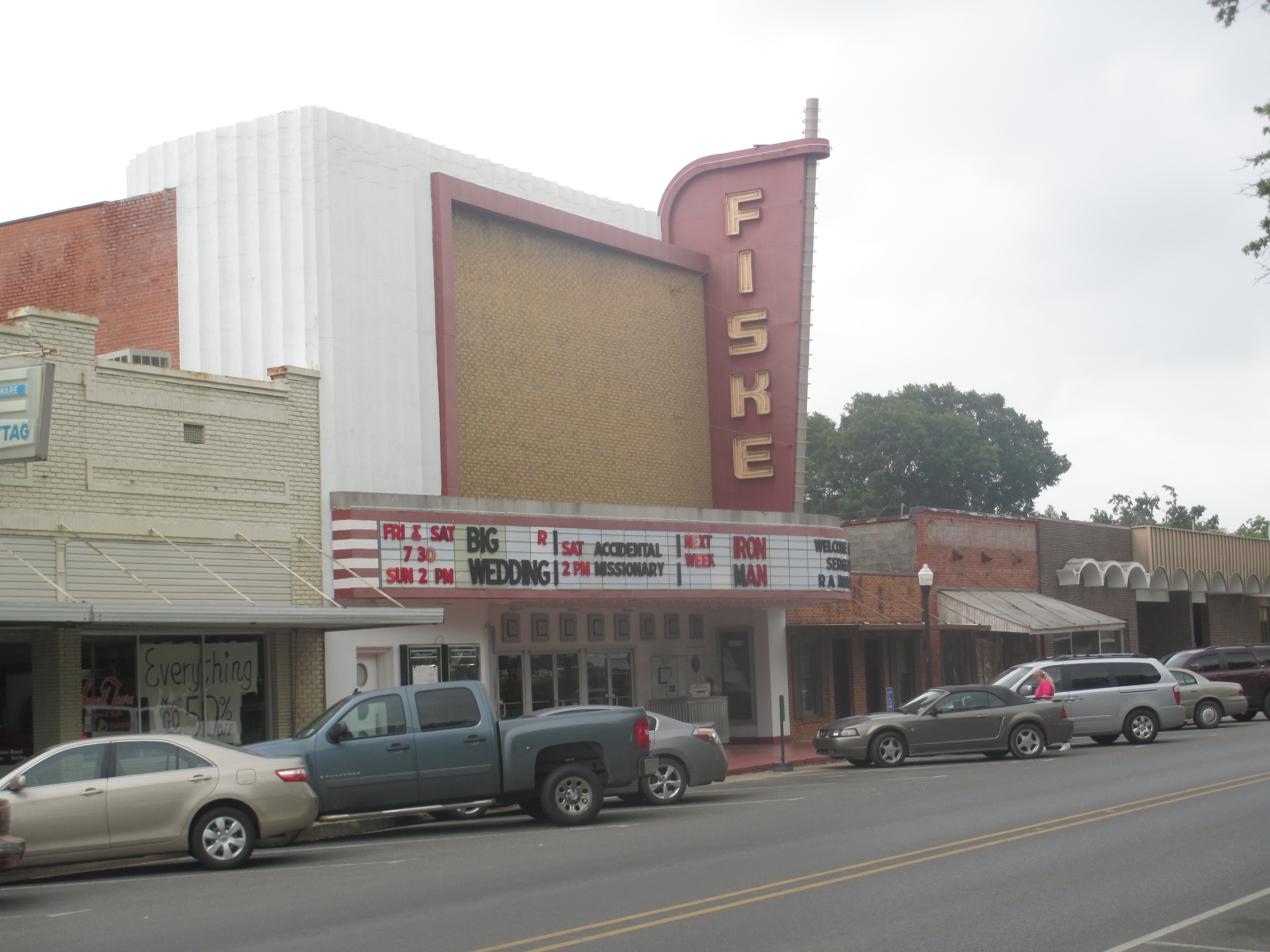
Historic Fiske Theatre in Oak Grove has served West Carroll Parish since 1928.

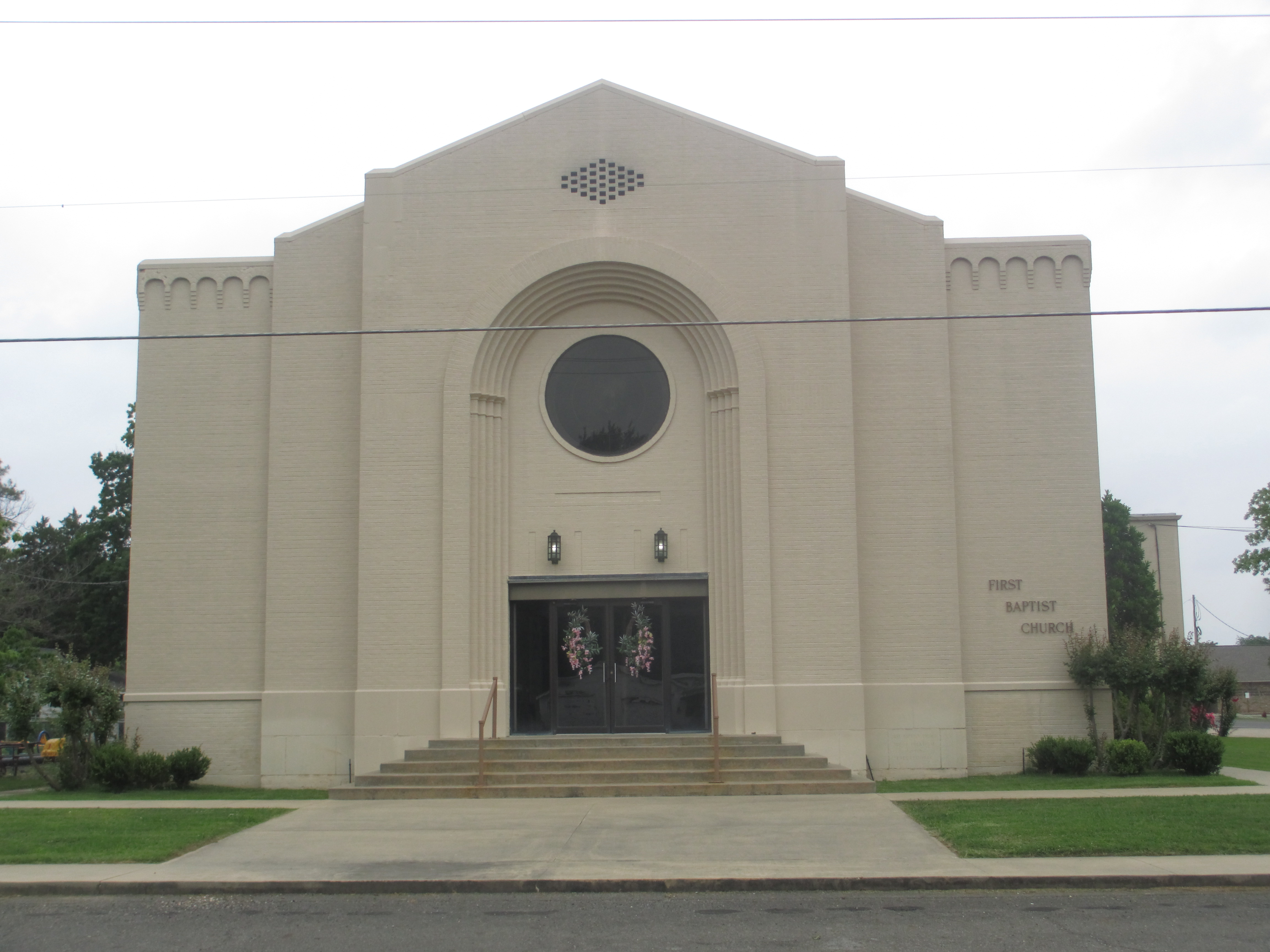
First Baptist Church in Oak Grove is one of the larger congregations in West Carroll Parish, located across from Oak Grove City Hall.

West Carroll Parish (French: Paroisse de Carroll Ouest) is a parish located in the northeastern part of the U.S. state of Louisiana. As of the 2020 census, the population was 9,751. The parish seat is Oak Grove. The parish was founded in 1877, when Carroll Parish was divided.

The area of cotton culture in Louisiana in parishes along this part of the Mississippi River was also referred to as the Natchez District. It included the parishes of East Carroll (after the split in 1877), Concordia, Madison and Tensas.

== History ==
Before being divided, Carroll Parish was named for Charles Carroll of Carrollton, Maryland, the only Roman Catholic signer of the Declaration of Independence and the last surviving signer of the document. It was organized by European Americans after the Louisiana Purchase.

West Carroll Parish has a long history of inhabitants who predated the formation of the United States by thousands of years. On the south end of West Carroll Parish is Poverty Point, a nearly square-mile complex of ancient major earthwork semi-circles and radiating lanes, plus additional platform mounds. This is one of the largest Native American earthworks in North America. Archeologists have determined that the site was built in the Late Archaic period beginning about 1500 BCE, and it was the central trading grounds for the Poverty Point culture that occupied the lower Mississippi River Valley. It has been referred to as the New York City of more than two millennia ago. Artifacts show trading reached to present-day Georgia and Great Lakes states such as Wisconsin. Later historic tribes in the area included the Choctaw and Chickasaw.

Though the area was explored by many French and Spanish in the 16th through 18th centuries, they did not establish permanent settlements, favoring areas on rivers with more direct access to the Gulf and major markets.

=== US annexation and development ===
After the United States' Louisiana Purchase of 1803, all of Northeast Louisiana was considered part of Ouachita Parish, including West Carroll. In 1807, a Methodist minister, Moses Floyd, settled on the west bank of the Bayou Macon. Later a trading post known as "Floyd" developed, and the village began to grow. It developed less than a mile from the Poverty Point site.

As the European-American population of Ouachita Parish continued to increase, the area was organized into smaller parishes; in 1832 Carroll Parish was carved out of Ouachita by the state legislature. This was in the period of Indian Removal, when most members of local tribes were moved to Indian Territory (now Oklahoma) to extinguish their land claims in Louisiana.

The parish seat was located in Lake Providence on the banks of the Mississippi River. Throughout the early part of the 19th century, the European-American population of the western portion of Carroll Parish continued to grow; its economy was based mainly on cotton production and timber. By 1855 the population had grown to the point where there were enough votes to move the parish seat west of the Bayou Macon and Floyd was selected. This area had developed into a thriving trading post due to steamboat traffic on the Macon. In 1856 construction began on the new courthouse, which was finished in late 1857.

With the move of the parish seat, more professionals and tradesmen settled in Floyd, and the town grew markedly. It developed as a typical frontier town with a hotel, post office, general store, and saloons.

In January 1861 the Louisiana Legislature voted to secede from the Union and declare itself a free and sovereign state. Less than two months later, Louisiana joined the Confederacy. According to the book, Between the Rivers, the war resulted in a divide that would eventually lead to the creation of West Carroll Parish:

When the Confederate Flag flew over the court house in Floyd, it was saluted by nearly everyone, but not so with our neighbors across the river. Plantation|Planters to the east, either out of conviction to their consciences or to save their property, signed an oath of allegiance to the United States, thus bringing a rift among neighbors who were willing to lose everything including their lives, for the cause of the South; and, they felt very bitter toward any neighbor signing such an oath.

(Note: This oath was required after Union forces occupied Louisiana.)

There was little fighting in this area associated with the Civil War. Union efforts were focused on trying to gain and maintain control of the Mississippi River, especially at Vicksburg, Mississippi.

Some historians believed that insurgent activity, such as the Quantrill Gang, which operated primarily in Missouri, replaced regular forces. This area was isolated and vast lowland swamps surrounded Floyd. Frank James was said to come through with Quantrill in the winter of 1863–1864, on their way to and from Texas. In the early 1870s during Reconstruction, Frank and his brother Jesse James continued their outlaw activities, robbing banks for personal gain from Missouri to Texas.

During the Reconstruction era, local leaders opposed those appointed by the federally appointed state government. Some people worked against the provision of rights to freedmen. In the 1870s, chapters of the White League developed throughout Louisiana, paramilitary groups that intimidated Republicans, suppressed voting by freedmen, and supported white Democrats returning to power in the state legislature.

=== Post-Reconstruction to present ===
Federal troops were withdrawn from the state in March 1877 as part of a federal compromise. Soon after white Democrats regained power in the state legislature, they approved the creation of West Carroll Parish, which had a majority-white population. Initially it had a population of 800 people and 200 families, both white and black. East Carroll Parish was majority black, as it had been the center of cotton plantation agriculture, dependent on the labor of numerous enslaved African Americans. After emancipation, they voted in support of the Republican Party.

Cotton and timber continued to be the life-blood of the new parish, although areas dependent on agriculture in the late nineteenth and early twentieth century had economic difficulties. The parish had ten cotton gins and three sawmills, and steamboats continued to run Bayou Macon as the main hub of transportation. Steamboat traffic on the Boeuf and Macon rivers dwindled due to the competition of railways constructed through the South. With the railroad, parish towns began to develop along the north–south road (La. 17). Among these were Pioneer, Forest, Oak Grove and Kilbourne. Closest to the parish seat and with a major sawmill, Pioneer grew rapidly.

In January 1909, Oak Grove was incorporated. Many of the parish's prominent citizens, such as Leopold Lipp, considered it as the intersection of the north–south and east–west (La. 2) roads. It was to become the economic center of the parish in the near future.

In 1915, an election was held to move the parish seat from Floyd to a town located on the railroad. The two towns competing for the honor were Oak Grove and Pioneer. With the largest population living in the south end of the parish, the people of Pioneer felt confident they would get the seat; but, the people of the north end of the parish gained the selection of Oak Grove by a small margin. With the parish seat moved, Pioneer began to decline.

In 1916, construction began on the new courthouse at Oak Grove. Before it was completed, a hail storm and tornado devastated the town late that year. It destroyed the first theater, a large majority of the new courthouse, and many other buildings in town. In January 1917 the new courthouse was opened, and so began of the modern era of Oak Grove. Its Main Street had businesses varying from general stores, drug stores, a modern theater, cafes, two banks and more.

The economy of the parish continued to be dominated by the timber and cotton industry. In the early part of the 20th century, Donald B. Fiske opened a state-of the art cotton gin and compress to complement his sawmill. It became one of the largest employers of the parish.

After World War II, the town and parish continued to prosper with new industry and business. In 1950, the most modern movie theatre in the South was opened by Fiske, and it is still in operation today. In this area, farmers began to cultivate sweet potatoes rather than cotton. The textile industry gradually moved out of southern mills to offshore locations out of the United States. A cannery was built along the railroad, and operated until near the end of the 20th century.

In the 1960s and 1970s, city growth continued, with the construction of a modern hospital and nursing home, and the Wells Lamont garment factory. In 1969 the entrepreneur Shelton Ruffin built a pre-manufactured pole barn for personal use. Its style and construction quickly gained in popularity around the region, thus spurring the formation of Ruffin Building Systems. It is now one of the largest manufacturers of metal buildings in the South and ships buildings internationally.

With the coming of the 1980s and the rise of the large department stores in malls, business on Main Street began to decline. But this historic district continues to remain vibrant with over 50 percent of its buildings occupied.

By the early 21st century, entertainment and retail shopping have become major parts of the economy in West Carroll. In 2004 the Thomas Jason Lingo Community Center opened with a 1,000-seat auditorium; it has many live events each year. The Fiske Theatre has been renovated and returned to regular operation as a first-run movie theatre. Both of these venues attract families from all over Northeast Louisiana and Southeast Arkansas to the parish for entertainment.

Today agriculture is still king in West Carroll; the main crops are corn, rice, cotton, and sweet potatoes. But the largest employers are West Carroll Health Systems, West Carroll School Board, Ruffin Building Systems, and Wal-Mart. West Carroll has five banking institutions to serve people's financial needs.

== Geography ==
According to the U.S. Census Bureau, the parish has a total area of 361 square miles (930 km^{2}), of which 360 square miles (930 km^{2}) is land and 0.9 square miles (2.3 km^{2}) (0.3%) is water.

=== Major highways ===
- Louisiana Highway 2
- Louisiana Highway 17
- Louisiana Highway 134
- Louisiana Highway 577
- Louisiana Highway 582
- Louisiana Highway 585
- Louisiana Highway 586
- Louisiana Highway 587
- Louisiana Highway 588
- Louisiana Highway 589
- Louisiana Highway 597
- Louisiana Highway 835
- Louisiana Highway 877
- Louisiana Highway 878
- Louisiana Highway 879
- Louisiana Highway 880

=== Adjacent counties and parishes ===
- Chicot County, Arkansas (north)
- East Carroll Parish (east)
- Richland Parish (south)
- Morehouse Parish (west)

=== National protected area ===
- Poverty Point National Monument

== Communities ==
=== Towns ===
- Oak Grove (parish seat)

=== Villages ===
- Epps
- Forest
- Kilbourne
- Pioneer

=== Unincorporated communities ===
- Goodwill
- Concord
- Bear Skin
- Green
- Redwing
- Chickasaw
- Old Floyd
- Darnell
- Terry
- Fiske Union

== Law enforcement ==
The West Carroll Sheriff's Office provides full-time law enforcement for the parish and has seventeen full-time deputies. Scott Mathews now serves as sheriff.

== Demographics ==
Historical population
Census	Pop.	Note	%±
1880	2,776		—
1890	3,748		35.0%
1900	3,685		−1.7%
1910	6,249		69.6%
1920	8,857		41.7%
1930	13,895		56.9%
1940	19,252		38.6%
1950	17,248		−10.4%
1960	14,177		−17.8%
1970	13,028		−8.1%
1980	12,922		−0.8%
1990	12,093		−6.4%
2000	12,314		1.8%
2010	11,604		−5.8%
2020	9,751		−16.0%
2025 (est.)	9,156	▼	−6.1%
U.S. Decennial Census; 1790–1960 1900–1990; 1990–2000 2010

=== 2020 census ===
As of the 2020 census, there were 9,751 people, 4,084 households, and 2,693 families residing in the parish. The median age was 44.2 years. 22.8% of residents were under the age of 18 and 22.6% of residents were 65 years of age or older. For every 100 females there were 93.9 males, and for every 100 females age 18 and over there were 89.9 males age 18 and over.

As of the 2020 census, the racial makeup of the parish was 81.0% White, 13.8% Black or African American, 0.4% American Indian and Alaska Native, 0.1% Asian, 0.1% Native Hawaiian and Pacific Islander, 1.3% from some other race, and 3.4% from two or more races. Hispanic or Latino residents of any race comprised 3.3% of the population.

As of the 2020 census, less than 0.1% of residents lived in urban areas, while 100.0% lived in rural areas.

As of the 2020 census, there were 4,084 households in the parish, of which 30.2% had children under the age of 18 living in them. Of all households, 46.2% were married-couple households, 18.9% were households with a male householder and no spouse or partner present, and 29.6% were households with a female householder and no spouse or partner present. About 29.7% of all households were made up of individuals and 15.2% had someone living alone who was 65 years of age or older.

As of the 2020 census, there were 4,656 housing units, of which 12.3% were vacant. Among occupied housing units, 76.2% were owner-occupied and 23.8% were renter-occupied. The homeowner vacancy rate was 1.7% and the rental vacancy rate was 9.5%.

=== Racial and ethnic composition ===
West Carroll Parish, Louisiana – Racial and ethnic composition Note: the US Census treats Hispanic/Latino as an ethnic category. This table excludes Latinos from the racial categories and assigns them to a separate category. Hispanics/Latinos may be of any race.
Race / Ethnicity (NH = Non-Hispanic)	Pop 1980	Pop 1990	Pop 2000	Pop 2010	Pop 2020	% 1980	% 1990	% 2000	% 2010	% 2020
White alone (NH)	10,724	9,927	9,741	9,337	7,799	82.99%	82.09%	79.11%	80.46%	79.98%
Black or African American alone (NH)	2,094	2,010	2,315	1,810	1,338	16.20%	16.62%	18.80%	15.60%	13.72%
Native American or Alaska Native alone (NH)	16	35	30	44	37	0.12%	0.29%	0.24%	0.38%	0.38%
Asian alone (NH)	8	6	16	26	13	0.06%	0.05%	0.13%	0.22%	0.13%
Native Hawaiian or Pacific Islander alone (NH)	x	x	0	0	0	x	x	0.00%	0.00%	0.00%
Other race alone (NH)	2	0	1	0	0	0.02%	0.00%	0.01%	0.00%	0.00%
Mixed race or Multiracial (NH)	x	x	45	88	239	x	x	0.37%	0.76%	2.45%
Hispanic or Latino (any race)	78	115	166	299	325	0.60%	0.95%	1.35%	2.58%	3.33%
Total	12,922	12,093	12,314	11,604	9,751	100.00%	100.00%	100.00%	100.00%	100.00%

== Politics ==
West Carroll Parish is majority white. Since the late 20th century, its voters, formerly strong Democrats, have strongly favored the Republican in presidential elections.

In 2008, Obama received 878 votes (17.6 percent), compared to Republican U.S. Senator John McCain's 4,045 votes (81.1 percent). In 2012, Mitt Romney polled 3,628 ballots (79.8 percent) of the vote, with 853 votes (18.8 percent) for U.S. President Barack Obama. The 80–19 split nearly parallels the racial composition of West Carroll. Since 2012, the Republican performance in the Parish has improved in every election.

In East Carroll Parish, however, which has a majority African-American population, Obama won nearly 62 percent of the ballots.

In 1992, the two major party presidential candidates virtually split West Carroll Parish. Republican U.S. President George H. W. Bush prevailed with 2,082 votes (40.7 percent) to Bill Clinton's 2,068 (40.4 percent). Ross Perot of Texas, running that year as an Independent, held another 771 votes (15.1 percent). In 1988, Bush handily defeated Michael Dukakis in West Carroll Parish, 3,077 (64.1 percent) to 1,607 (33.5 percent).

The last Democrat to win the presidential contest in West Carroll Parish was Jimmy Carter of Georgia, a favorite son of the South, in his 1976 defeat of U.S. President Gerald Ford, Jr.

United States presidential election results for West Carroll Parish, Louisiana
Year	Republican		Democratic		Third party(ies)	
Year	No.	%	No.	%	No.	%
1912	1	0.40%	159	63.35%	91	36.25%
1916	14	4.28%	311	95.11%	2	0.61%
1920	104	22.13%	346	73.62%	20	4.26%
1924	68	16.23%	342	81.62%	9	2.15%
1928	214	24.13%	673	75.87%	0	0.00%
1932	31	2.06%	1,471	97.94%	0	0.00%
1936	232	13.88%	1,440	86.12%	0	0.00%
1940	362	16.18%	1,876	83.82%	0	0.00%
1944	581	29.48%	1,390	70.52%	0	0.00%
1948	151	6.57%	921	40.10%	1,225	53.33%
1952	1,398	40.66%	2,040	59.34%	0	0.00%
1956	658	25.10%	875	33.37%	1,089	41.53%
1960	742	30.62%	784	32.36%	897	37.02%
1964	3,017	88.42%	395	11.58%	0	0.00%
1968	585	12.85%	395	8.67%	3,574	78.48%
1972	2,997	77.24%	571	14.72%	312	8.04%
1976	2,407	47.09%	2,595	50.76%	110	2.15%
1980	3,430	60.05%	2,118	37.08%	164	2.87%
1984	3,874	70.84%	1,474	26.95%	121	2.21%
1988	3,077	64.14%	1,607	33.50%	113	2.36%
1992	2,082	40.66%	2,068	40.39%	970	18.95%
1996	2,366	49.66%	1,853	38.90%	545	11.44%
2000	3,220	68.88%	1,319	28.21%	136	2.91%
2004	3,740	74.31%	1,231	24.46%	62	1.23%
2008	4,045	81.11%	878	17.61%	64	1.28%
2012	3,628	79.77%	853	18.76%	67	1.47%
2016	3,970	83.42%	715	15.02%	74	1.55%
2020	4,317	85.45%	710	14.05%	25	0.49%
2024	3,986	86.60%	578	12.56%	39	0.85%

== Education ==
West Carroll Parish public schools are operated by the West Carroll Parish School Board. The public school system consist of four high schools and one elementary school that consistently rank at the top of the state in test scores and on the athletic field.

== National Guard ==
The 921ST Engineer Company (Vertical) of the 528th Engineer Brigade resides in Oak Grove, Louisiana.

== Prison ==
Name	Address	Zip	Aged
West Carroll Parish Detention Center	180 Capital Bank Dr, Epps, Louisiana	71237	18+

== Notable people ==
- Vance McAllister (born January 1974), American businessman and politician
- W. Spencer Myrick (1913–2002), American politician
- Tony Joe White (1943–2018), American musician

== See also ==
- National Register of Historic Places listings in West Carroll Parish, Louisiana
