= West Carroll Parish School Board =

School district in Louisiana, United States

Coordinates: 32.8566°N 91.3968°W

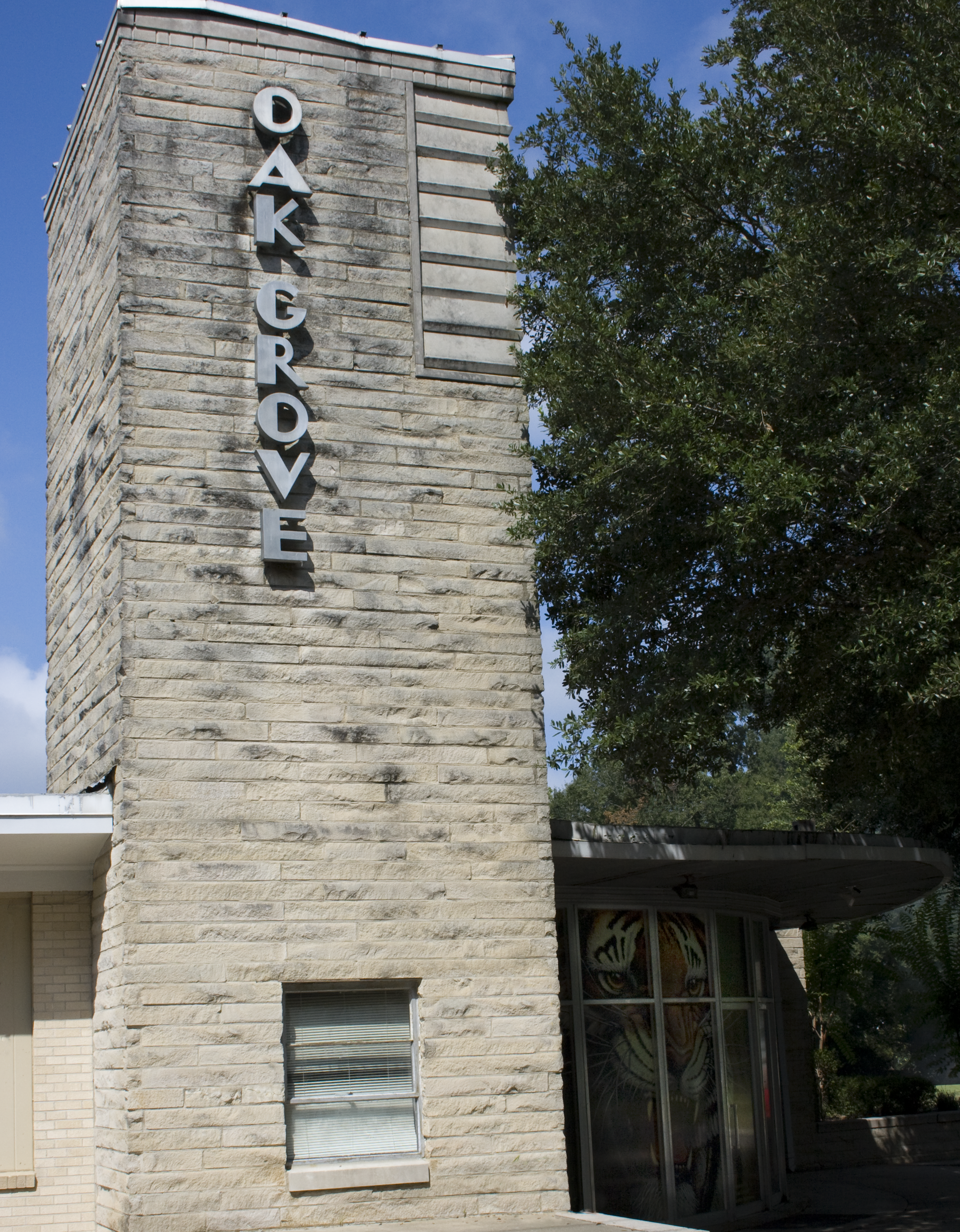
Front entrance to Oak Grove High School in Oak Grove, Louisiana

The West Carroll Parish School Board is an entity responsible for the operation of public schools in West Carroll Parish, Louisiana, United States. It is headquartered in the parish seat of Oak Grove.

In the 2012–2013 school year, West Carroll Parish public schools had the tenth highest rate of improvement statewide in the annual end-of-course examinations administered in Algebra I and English II.

== Schools ==
- Grades 7-12
  - Oak Grove High School (Oak Grove)
  - Oak Grove Elementary School (Oak Grove)
- Grades PK-12
  - Epps High School (Epps)
  - Forest High School (Forest)
  - Kilbourne High School (Kilbourne)

== Demographics ==
- Total Students (as of October 1, 2007): 2,308
- Gender
  - Male: 53%
  - Female: 47%
- Race/Ethnicity
  - White: 78.51%
  - African American: 18.85%
  - Hispanic: 2.38%
  - Asian: 0.13%
  - Native American: 0.13%
- Socio-Economic Indicators
  - At-Risk: 71.88%
  - Free Lunch: 62.39%
  - Reduced Lunch: 9.49%

== See also ==
- List of school districts in Louisiana
