= Epps, Louisiana =

Village of Epps
- Village
- Location of Epps in West Carroll Parish, Louisiana.

- Location of Louisiana in the United States
- Coordinates: 32°36′14″N 91°28′53″W
- Country: United States
- State: Louisiana
- Parish: West Carroll

Government
  - Mayor: Josh Jones (I)

Area
  - Total: 0.97 sq mi (2.50 km^{2})
  - Land: 0.97 sq mi (2.50 km^{2})
  - Water: 0 sq mi (0.00 km^{2})
- Elevation: 102 ft (31 m)

Population (2020)
  - Total: 358
  - Density: 370.8/sq mi (143.16/km^{2})
- Time zone: UTC-6 (CST)
  - Summer (DST): UTC-5 (CDT)
- Area code: 318
- FIPS code: 22-24145
- GNIS feature ID: 2407450

Epps is a village in West Carroll Parish, Louisiana, United States. The population was 358 at the 2020 census.

== History ==
Very little is known about the early days of the town, but it is thought the settlement began as steamboat traffic carrying cotton and timber increased on Bayou Macon in the 1850s. Though not confirmed, it is believed that the town was named after Edwin Epps. Epps owned a cotton plantation in Avoyelles Parish and he is known as one of the enslavers of the famous abolitionist Solomon Northup.

The Great Mississippi Flood of 1927 affected Epps less severely then other towns within the Mississippi embayment, even serving as a Red Cross Relief Camp.

Epps was incorporated as a village in 1939.

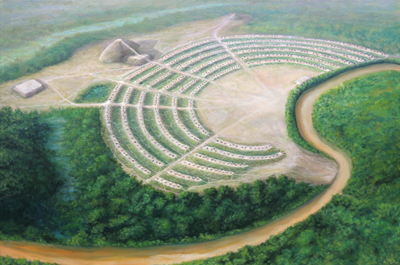
An artist's 2014 conception of the complete site c. 1600-1300 BCE.

Poverty Point and the Late Archaic mounds of the Poverty Point culture, located five miles northeast of the village, were declared a National Historic Landmark on June 13, 1962. It later became a State Historic Site and opened to the public in 1976. In 1988, Congress designated the site as a U.S. National Monument.

The 2,700-acre, man-made lake of the Poverty Point Reservoir State Park is also located five miles south of the village within Richland Parish.

== Geography ==
According to the United States Census Bureau, the village has a total area of 1.0 square mile (2.6 km^{2}), all land.

== Demographics ==
Historical population
Census	Pop.	Note	%±
1940	391		—
1950	308		−21.2%
1960	411		33.4%
1970	448		9.0%
1980	672		50.0%
1990	541		−19.5%
2000	1,153		113.1%
2010	854		−25.9%
2020	358		−58.1%
2025 (est.)	334	▼	−6.7%
U.S. Decennial Census

=== 2020 census ===
Epps village, Louisiana – Racial and ethnic composition Note: the US Census treats Hispanic/Latino as an ethnic category. This table excludes Latinos from the racial categories and assigns them to a separate category. Hispanics/Latinos may be of any race.
Race / Ethnicity (NH = Non-Hispanic)	Pop 2010	Pop 2020	% 2010	% 2020
White alone (NH)	356	201	41.69%	56.15%
Black or African American alone (NH)	431	134	50.47%	37.43%
Native American or Alaska Native alone (NH)	6	3	0.70%	0.84%
Asian alone (NH)	1	1	0.12%	0.28%
Pacific Islander alone (NH)	0	0	0.00%	0.00%
Some Other Race alone (NH)	0	0	0.00%	0.00%
Mixed Race/Multi-Racial (NH)	10	14	1.17%	3.91%
Hispanic or Latino (any race)	50	5	5.85%	1.40%
Total	854	358	100.00%	100.00%

As of the census of 2000, there were 1,153 people, 209 households, and 156 families residing in the village. The population density was 1,188.6 inhabitants per square mile (458.9/km^{2}). There were 237 housing units at an average density of 244.3 per square mile (94.3/km^{2}). The racial makeup of the village was 36.17% White, 63.05% African American, 0.09% Asian, and 0.69% from two or more races. Hispanic or Latino of any race were 1.30% of the population.

There were 209 households, out of which 37.8% had children under the age of 18 living with them, 48.8% were married couples living together, 21.5% had a female householder with no husband present, and 24.9% were non-families. 23.0% of all households were made up of individuals, and 13.4% had someone living alone who was 65 years of age or older. The average household size was 2.89 and the average family size was 3.41.

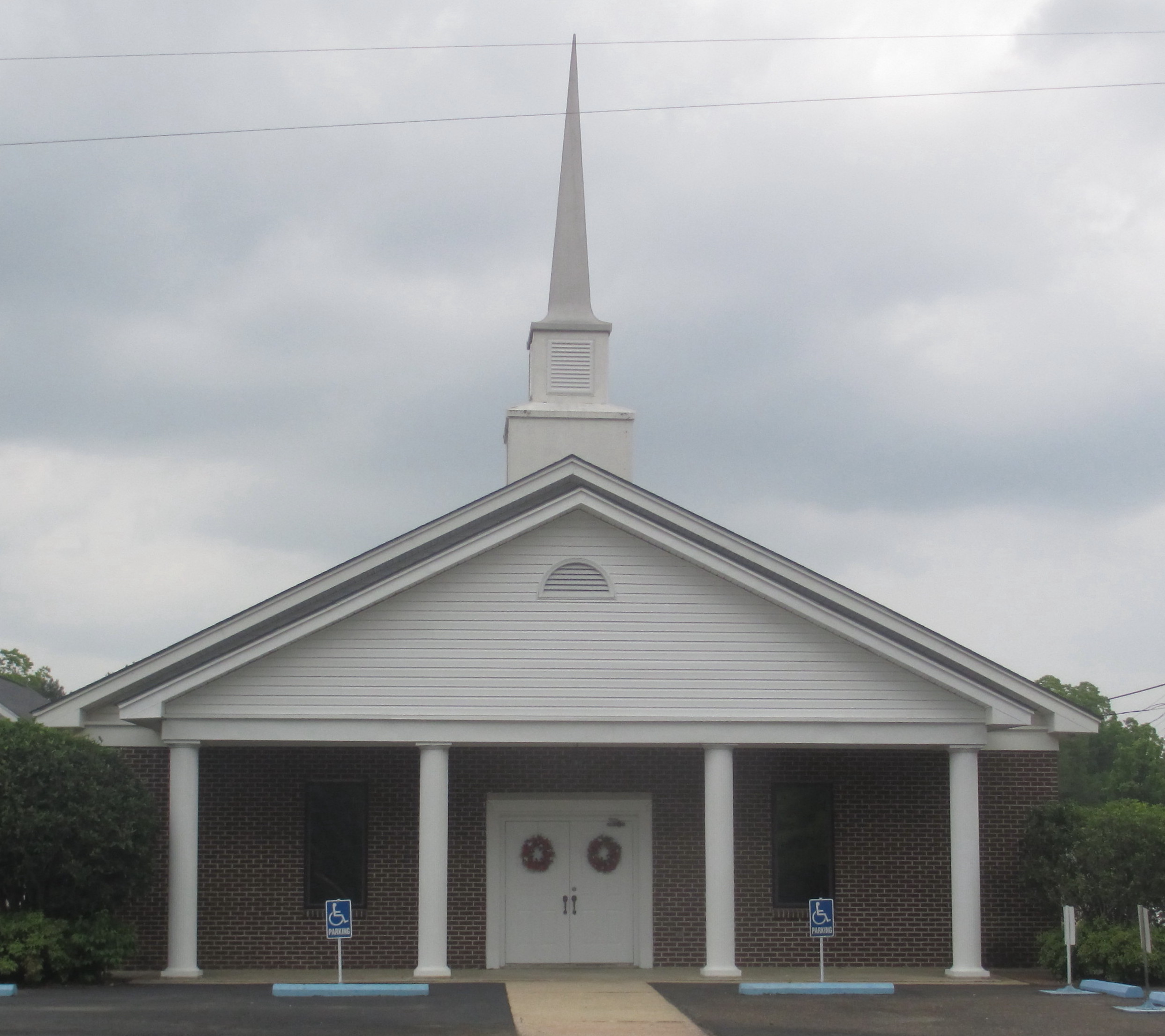
Epps Baptist Church

In the village, the population was spread out, with 17.4% under the age of 18, 22.3% from 18 to 24, 40.5% from 25 to 44, 14.0% from 45 to 64, and 5.8% who were 65 years of age or older. The median age was 30 years. For every 100 females there were 268.4 males. For every 100 females age 18 and over, there were 338.7 males.

The median income for a household in the village was $20,956, and the median income for a family was $23,125. Males had a median income of $20,000 versus $15,804 for females. The per capita income for the village was $6,486. About 29.7% of families and 38.3% of the population were below the poverty line, including 50.8% of those under age 18 and 48.5% of those age 65 or over.

== Education ==
Public schools are operated by the West Carroll Parish School Board. Epps High School closed in 2022 and is now Epps Elementary. High school age students are now zoned for Oak Grove High School.

== Notable people ==
- Jake Jones (1920―2000), a major league baseball player from 1941 to 1948, was born in Epps.
