= Jamar Adcock =

Louisiana politician

Jamar William Adcock (1917 - 1991) was a state legislator in Louisiana. He served in the U.S. Army during World War II. He was a Democrat. He represented District 4 in the Louisiana Senate.

He was a partner in an investment firm in Rayville, Louisiana.

He was a leader in discussions about a proposed medical school for Northeast Louisiana State College.
