= Oak Grove High School (Louisiana) =

High school in Louisiana, United States

Location
- 501 West Main St. Oak Grove, (West Carroll Parish), Louisiana 71263; United States; 32.513947°N 91.231841°W

Information
- Type: Public
- Established: 1916
- School district: West Carroll Parish School Board
- Teaching staff: 28.50 (on an FTE basis)
- Grades: 6–12
- Enrollment: 548 (2023–2024)
- Student to teacher ratio: 19.23
- Colors: Black, white and gold
- Athletics conference: LHSAA District 2-2A
- Mascot: Tiger
- Nickname: Tigers
- Website: www.wcpsb.com/schools/oak-grove-high-school

Oak Grove High School is a public junior and senior high school in Oak Grove, Louisiana, United States, and a part of the West Carroll Parish School Board.

== Athletics ==
Oak Grove High athletics competes in the LHSAA.

=== Championships ===
Football championships

- (8) State Championships: 1989, 1991, 1999, 2001, 2019, 2020, 2022, 2023

=== Football ===
Coaches

- Vic Dalrymple - LHSAA Hall of Fame head football coach, Vic Dalrymple, was head coach at Oak Grove High from 1981 to 2012. During his thirty-two seasons at the school, he compiled a 320–99–0 record and won fifteen district championships and four state championships in 1989, 1991, 1999, and 2001. His teams were state runners-up in 1986, 1997, and 2004.

== Notable alumni ==
- Kenny Hill, former NFL defensive back and three-time Super Bowl champion
- Jason Martin, former professional football quarterback
- Kaleb Proctor, NFL defensive end for the Arizona Cardinals
- Jack Torrance, Olympic shot putter, former shot put world-record holder, and NFL player
