= Oak Grove, Louisiana =

- Town
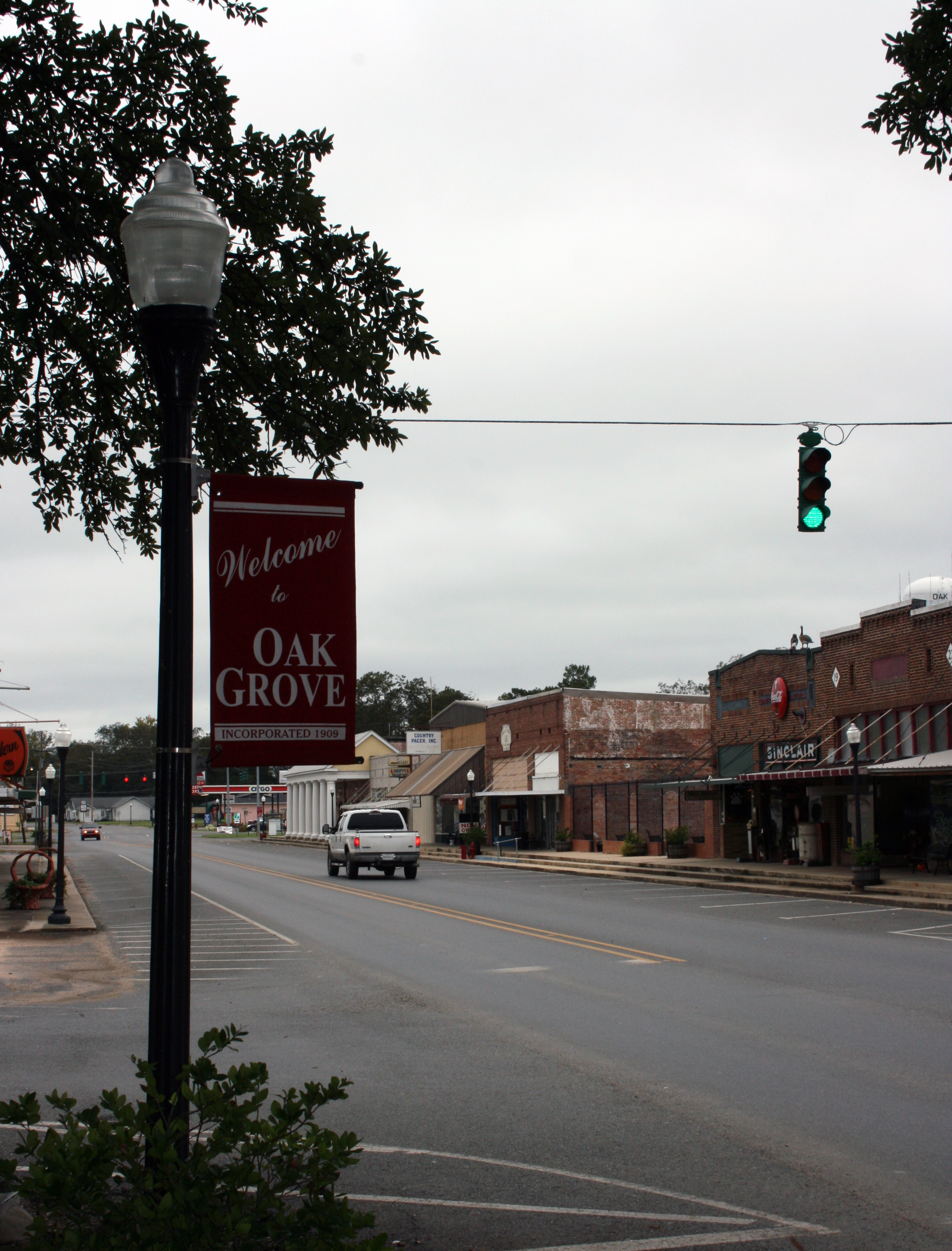
- Downtown Oak Grove facing west

- Location of Oak Grove in West Carroll Parish, Louisiana.

- Location of Louisiana in the United States
- Coordinates: 32°51′55″N 91°23′01″W
- Country: United States
- State: Louisiana
- Parish: West Carroll

Government
  - Mayor: Hubert Rollinson Jr

Area
  - Total: 1.74 sq mi (4.51 km^{2})
  - Land: 1.72 sq mi (4.45 km^{2})
  - Water: 0.023 sq mi (0.06 km^{2})
- Elevation: 118 ft (36 m)

Population (2020)
  - Total: 1,441
  - Density: 838.5/sq mi (323.74/km^{2})
- Time zone: UTC-6 (CST)
  - Summer (DST): UTC-5 (CDT)
- ZIP code: 71263
- Area code: 318
- FIPS code: 22-56820
- GNIS feature ID: 2407017
- Website: townofoakgrove.com

Oak Grove is the parish seat of West Carroll Parish in northeastern Louisiana, United States. The population was 1,441 at the 2020 United States census.

== Geography ==
Louisiana Highway 2 forms Main Street in Oak Grove.

According to the United States Census Bureau, the town has a total area of 1.7 square miles (4.5 km^{2}), of which 1.7 square miles (4.4 km^{2}) is land and 0.04 square mile (0.1 km^{2}) (1.15%) is water.

== Demographics ==
Historical population
Census	Pop.	Note	%±
1910	398		—
1920	700		75.9%
1930	1,241		77.3%
1940	1,654		33.3%
1950	1,796		8.6%
1960	1,797		0.1%
1970	1,980		10.2%
1980	2,214		11.8%
1990	2,126		−4.0%
2000	2,174		2.3%
2010	1,727		−20.6%
2020	1,441		−16.6%
2025 (est.)	1,350	▼	−6.3%
U.S. Decennial Census

Oak Grove racial composition as of 2020
Race	Num.	Perc.
White (non-Hispanic)	922	63.98%
Black or African American (non-Hispanic)	408	28.31%
Native American	5	0.35%
Other/Mixed	37	2.57%
Hispanic or Latino	69	4.79%

As of the 2020 United States census, there were 1,441 people, 652 households, and 384 families residing in the town.

== Arts and culture ==
The Fiske Theatre, built in 1928, is the oldest operating movie theatre in northeast Louisiana and the last remaining single-screen facility. The building is listed on the National Register of Historic Places.

== Education ==
Public schools are operated by the West Carroll Parish School Board. Schools include Oak Grove Elementary School, and Oak Grove High School.

== Media ==
The West Carroll Gazette newspaper serves the Oak Grove Area.

KWCL-FM is a radio station in Oak Grove.
