= Mercy rule =

Rule that ends a sports event due to an insurmountable lead

A mercy rule, slaughter rule, knockout rule, or skunk rule ends a two-competitor sports competition earlier than the scheduled endpoint if one competitor has a very large and presumably insurmountable scoring lead over the other. It is called the mercy rule because it spares further humiliation for the loser. It is common in youth sports in North America, where running up the score is considered unsporting. It is especially common in baseball and softball, in which there is no game clock and no theoretical limit to an inning.

The rules vary widely, depending on the level of competition, but nearly all youth sports leagues and high school sports associations and many college sports associations in the United States have mercy rules for sports including baseball, softball, American football and association football.

However, mercy rules usually do not take effect until a prescribed point in the game (like the second half of an association football game). Thus, one team, particularly if it is decidedly better than a weaker opponent, can still "run up the score" before the rule takes effect. For instance, in American football, one team could be ahead by 70 points with three minutes left in the first half; in baseball, the better team could have a 20-run lead in the second inning, but the game would still continue.

== American football ==
=== Middle and high school football ===
34 U.S. states have implemented a mercy rule for middle or high school football, commonly involving a "continuous clock" timing mechanism whereby the game clock continues to run during most stoppages, such as incomplete passes or plays out of bounds. This rule is typically triggered when one team gains a substantial lead during the second half of the game. For example, in 2022, Louisiana adopted a variation of this rule, instituting a running clock when the point differential reaches 42 at any point during the game. This greatly decreases the amount of time to complete the game, which reduces the leading team's chances to score more and the time the trailing team must spend facing an insurmountable deficit. In most states, the clock stops only for scores, timeouts (officials', injury, or charged), or the end of the quarter. Plays that normally stop the clock, such as penalties, incomplete passes, going out of bounds, or change of possession, do not. The rule varies by state; for example, the clock does not stop upon a score in Colorado, Indiana, Kansas (regular-season games only), or Missouri (fourth quarter only).

In most states, if the point differential is reduced below the mercy rule-invoking amount, normal timing procedures resume until the end of the game or the mercy rule-invoking point differential is reestablished; in Colorado, Georgia, Kansas and Louisiana, the clock continues to run even if the differential falls below the threshold. Most states with mercy rules waive this rule for championship games.

In some states, coaches and game officials may choose to end a game at their own discretion any time during the second half if the continuous clock rule is in effect; that usually happens if a lopsided margin continues to increase or if threatening weather is imminent. Sometimes the coach of the losing team agrees to shorten the length of a quarter in addition to the continuous clock rule. Although it is rare, some states or high school conferences have rules prohibiting a team with a very large lead from running certain plays for the rest of the game, such as a deep pass or outside run.

In some states (where 8-man and 6-man football is widely used), the rules require a game to end when one team is ahead by a certain score (like 45 or 50 points) at halftime or any time thereafter. In other states with 6- or 8-man football, continuous clock rules are used, and the rule may be modified; for instance, in Iowa, the rule goes into effect if the 35-point differential is reached at any time after the first quarter.

In a variant on the mercy rule used in Connecticut high school football from 2006 to 2016, the team's coach was issued a one-game suspension (i.e., for the team's next game) if at any point the team had a 50-point lead. In 2016 it was replaced with a running clock rule.

=== College football ===
The National Collegiate Athletic Association's mercy rule provides, "Any time during the game, the playing time of any remaining period or periods and the intermission between halves may be shortened by mutual agreement of the opposing head coaches and the referee." (NCAA Football Rule 3-2-2-a) NCAA Football Approved Ruling 3-2-2-I cites an example: "At halftime the score is 56–0. The coaches and the referee agree that the third and fourth quarters should be shortened to 12 minutes each. The coaches also request that the second half be played with a 'running clock' i.e., that the game clock not be stopped." The NCAA Football Rules Committee determined, "The remaining quarters may be shortened to 12 minutes each. However, the 'running clock' is not allowed; normal clock rules apply for the entire game."

The most recent example of an NCAA football game shortened by invoking this rule occurred on September 13, 2024, when the South Alabama Jaguars played the Northwestern State Demons. After the third quarter, with the Jaguars leading the Demons 87–10, both coaches agreed to shorten the fourth quarter to six minutes, resulting in 51 minutes of play. This was the most points scored by a FBS team since 1991. The shortened game resulted in some sportsbooks voiding bets due to house rules requiring 55 minutes of play for the game to count.

In the case of the two-year junior colleges, only the Mississippi Association of Community Colleges Conference has a mercy rule for football that has been implemented since the 2014 football season in that if a team is leading by 38 points or more after halftime, the clock will run continuously in the second half.

== Soccer ==
International Blind Sports Federation rules require that any time during a game in which one team has scored ten more goals than the other team that game is deemed completed. In U.S. high school soccer, most states use a mercy rule that ends the game if one team is ahead by ten or more goals at any point from halftime onward, effectively turning it into The Soccer Tournament in that an Elam Ending type target score of one team being ahead by ten goals is set. Once the lead is up to ten goals, the game ends. Youth soccer leagues use variations on the rule.

== Baseball and softball ==
In international competitions sanctioned by the World Baseball Softball Confederation (WBSC). In the World Baseball Classic (WBC), games are ended when one team is ahead by 10 runs, once at least seven completed innings are played by the trailing team. In seven-inning contests (women's competition and doubleheaders), the same applies after five innings of a seven-inning game.

The inaugural WBC in 2006 followed the IBAF mercy rule, with an additional rule stopping a game after five innings when a team is ahead by at least 15 runs. The mercy rules applied to the round-robin (now double-elimination) matches only, not to the semi-finals or final.

In a six-inning game such as Little League Baseball and Softball, rules call for the game to end if the winning team is ahead by 15 runs after three innings played or 10 runs after four innings played by the trailing team. In a seven-inning game at the intermediate level or higher, the corresponding run rule is applied for 15 runs after four innings, or 10 runs after five innings. Little League refers to this rule as the run rule, instead of the mercy rule.

Softball rules are different for fast/modified fast pitch and slow pitch. In WBSC-sanctioned competitions, the run-ahead rule (the WBSC terminology) is, for fast or modified fast pitch, 20 runs after three innings, 15 after four, or 8 after 5. In slow pitch, the margin is 20 runs after four innings or 15 after five. The NCAA has also adopted the rule.

In regular season or conference tournament NCAA and NAIA college baseball, the IBAF rule may be implemented. Most NCAA conferences implement the rule for player safety (specifically pitchers) and time constraints in a blowout win. The rule is not allowed in NCAA tournament play (regionals, super regionals and Men's College World Series), in which all games must be at least nine innings.

In NCAA softball (where the rule is called the "run rule"), the rule is invoked if one team is ahead by at least eight runs after five innings and, unlike with college baseball, applies in the NCAA tournament as well, including in the championship series since 2023. In American high school softball, most states use a mercy rule of 20 runs ahead in three innings or 10 in five innings. (In either case, if the home team is ahead by the requisite number of runs, the game will end after the top half of the inning.) In American softball, "run-rule" has become a verb, with the winning team in a game which ends due to this rule often said to have "run-ruled" its opponent (also expressed as the losing team having been "run-ruled").

Most state high school associations (where games are seven innings) use the IBAF Women's rule after five innings have been played by the trailing team; some associations further the rule by ending a game after either three or four innings if the lead is at least 15 runs. For softball, the rule is 12 after three innings and 10 after five. However, since the home team has the last at-bat, the rules usually allow visiting teams to score an unlimited number of runs in the top half of an inning. That can be prevented by invoking the rule only after the home team has completed its half of the inning.

In Baseball5, a WBSC variation of baseball and softball which is played to five innings, a team which leads by 15 runs after three innings or 10 after four innings automatically wins.

Due to the untimed nature of innings, some leagues either impose caps on the number of runs that can be scored in one inning (usually in the 4-8 range) or limit the number of plate appearances in an inning (typically, such a limit will consist of one rotation of the batting order). Such rules ensure that games will complete in a reasonable length of time, but it can also mean that a lead of a certain size becomes insurmountable by the cap, which can be prevented by not invoking the rule in such circumstances.

== Basketball ==
In high school basketball, many states have a "continuous clock" rule similar to American football, which takes effect in the second half after a lead grows to a prescribed point (in Iowa, 35 points or more; in Kansas, 30 points or more but only in the fourth quarter; in Louisiana, the rule is invoked at any time during the game when one team gains a 35-point lead). The clock stops only for charged, officials' or injury time-outs; or at the end of the third quarter (and the first and second quarters in Louisiana if the 35-point margin is reached in the first half; the normal 10-minute halftime is still taken). The clock would not stop when it would normally stop, such as for fouls, free throws, out-of-bounds plays or substitutions.

The rules vary when normal timing procedures take effect after a lead is diminished (such as because of the trailing team's rally); for instance, in Iowa, normal timing procedures are enforced if the lead is lowered to 25 points but re-instituted once the lead grows back to 35 or more points. By comparison, in Kansas and Louisiana, if the running clock is triggered, it will not stop except for a timeout or an injury even if the differential is reduced to under 30 points. As with other sports, some states offer provisions to allow a team to end the game early by mutual decision of the coaches (for instance, if a large lead continues to grow and the talent disparity is obvious).

== Boxing ==
In amateur boxing, from 1992 until 2013 (when the computer scoring system was abandoned and replaced by the 10-point must system), when if a boxer trails by more than 20 points, the referee stops the fight and the boxer that is leading automatically wins; bouts which end this way may be noted as "RSC" (referee stopped contest) with notations for an outclassed opponent (RSCO) or outscored opponent (RSCOS). It would not be declared injury (RSCI) or head injury (RSCH).

While a boxer who loses on the mercy rule is scored RSCO and would be similar to a technical knockout in professional boxing, it is not scored a loss by knockout, and the mandatory suspension for losing on a knockout did not apply for an Outclassed loss.

== Curling ==
In curling, the losing team can concede at any time, except for international competitions, where they must wait until the sixth end is completed to do so (and eighth end in play-off games).

In curling conducted by Special Olympics Canada, games end if 6 ends have passed and one team leads by 10 points.

== Goalball ==
In the Paralympic team sport for the vision-impaired, goalball, a maximum goal difference is when 'any time one team has scored ten goals more than the team it is playing'. The game ends immediately upon that goal. This rule commenced on 1 January 2002.

== Wrestling ==
In American collegiate wrestling and high school wrestling, a wrestler wins by technical fall, and the match therefore ends, if he builds a 15-point lead. If a wrestler gains a 15-point lead by having his opponent in a near-fall, the referee will allow the offensive wrestler the opportunity to win by fall without liability to be reversed and pinned. The bout ends when a fall is awarded or the near-fall ends.

In freestyle wrestling, a wrestler wins by technical fall if he builds a 10-point lead. In Greco-Roman, a wrestler wins by technical fall if he builds an 8-point lead.

== See also ==
- Running out the clock
