= Qudarius Ford =

American gridiron football player (born 1992)

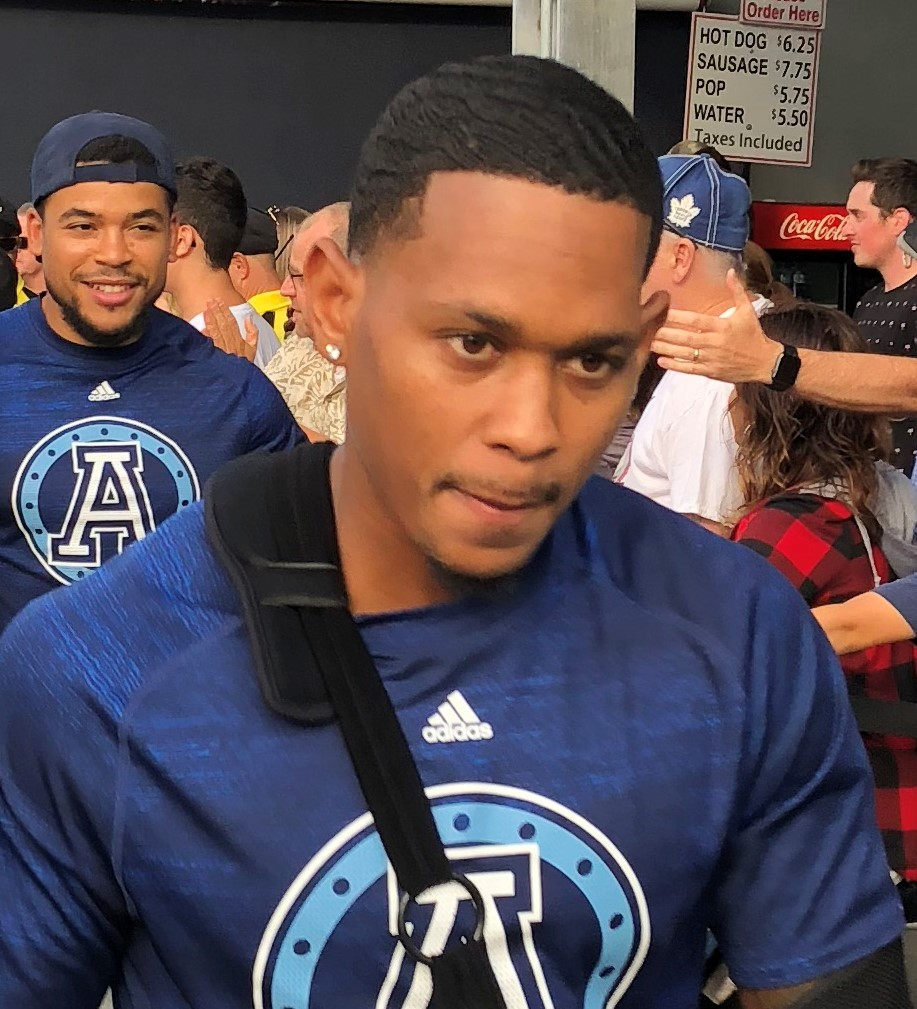
- Ford with the Toronto Argonauts in 2018

Profile
- Position: Defensive back

Personal information
- Born: February 7, 1992 (age 34); Pensacola, Florida, U.S.
- Listed height: 5 ft 9 in (1.75 m)
- Listed weight: 170 lb (77 kg)

Career information
- High school: J. M. Tate
- College: South Alabama

Career history
- 2016: Saskatchewan Roughriders*
- 2017–2019: Toronto Argonauts
- 2020–2021: Hamilton Tiger-Cats*
- * Offseason or practice squad member only

Awards and highlights
- Grey Cup champion (2017)
- Stats at CFL.ca

Qudarius Jaquinn Ford (born February 7, 1992) is an American former professional football defensive back. He played college football at South Alabama where he was on the team from 2010 to 2015.

Ford signed with the Toronto Argonauts on April 24, 2017, after attending a free agent tryout at IMG Academy. He won his first Grey Cup championship in 2017 where he recorded a team-leading eight defensive tackles in the game. After two seasons where he missed time due to injury, he was released by the Argonauts on February 3, 2020.

Ford signed a two-year contract with the Hamilton Tiger-Cats on February 11, 2020. He was released on June 28, 2021.
