= Sam McCorkle =

American football player and coach (born 1949)

Biographical details
- Born: November 19, 1949 (age 76); Big Stone Gap, Virginia, U.S.

Playing career
- 1970–1972: Livingston
- Position: Center

Coaching career (HC unless noted)
- 1973: Livingston (GA)
- 1974–1975: Talladega HS (assistant)
- 1976: Minor HS (assistant)
- 1977: Etowah HS (AL) (assistant)
- 1978–1979: Cordova HS (AL)
- 1980–1981: North Texas State (assistant)
- 1982: Ole Miss (TE)
- 1983–1984: Vanderbilt (OL/TE)
- 1985–1990: Livingston
- 1991: Kentucky (assistant)
- 1992: Austin Peay (RB)
- 1993–1994: Austin Peay (DC)
- 1995–1996: J. M. Tate HS (FL)
- 1997–1999: Mississippi Delta (OC)
- 2000–2002: Tennessee–Martin
- 2003: West Alabama (assistant)
- 2004–2005: West Alabama
- 2008: Columbia HS (AL)
- 2009–2012: Etowah HS (AL)
- 2013–2014: Parrish HS (AL)
- 2014–2015: Carbon Hill HS (AL) (DC)
- 2016–2018: Oxford HS (MS) (OC/OL)
- 2019: Lamar HS (MS) (OC/OL)

Head coaching record
- Overall: 29–87–2 (college)

Sam McCorkle (born November 19, 1949) is former head football coach at both the University of West Alabama and the University of Tennessee at Martin. He grew up in Meridian, Mississippi and attended Livingston University (now the University of West Alabama) where he played center from 1970 to 1972. He began his coaching career in 1973 and held assistant coaching positions at North Texas State, Ole Miss, Vanderbilt, Livingston, Kentucky, Austin Peay, Mississippi Delta Community College and several high schools throughout Alabama. He served as the head coach of Etowah High School in Attalla, Alabama from 2009 to 2012. He served as the offensive coordinator and offensive line coach at Oxford High School in Oxford, Mississippi from 2016 to 2018 as well as serving the same positions at Lamar School in Meridian, Mississippi in 2019 before he decided to retire.

== Head coaching career ==
On December 19, 1984, McCorkle was hired to serve as head coach at Livingston from his assistant coach position at Vanderbilt. Never finishing higher than fourth in the Gulf South Conference standings, McCorkle resigned from his post on November 14, 1990. His overall record from 1985 to 1990 was 20 wins, 44 losses and two ties (20–44–2). After serving as an assistant coach as a number of schools, McCorkle returned to the head coaching ranks on December 7, 1999, when he was hired by the University of Tennessee at Martin. After a 2–6 start to the 2002 season, McCorkle was fired with Johnny Jernigan serving as interim head coach through the end of the season. His overall record from 2000 to 2002 was five wins and 25 losses (5–25).

Following Martin, McCorkle returned to West Alabama was an assistant coach. Following the resignation of Randy Pippin, he was promoted for a second stint as head coach at his alma mater in November 2003. After two seasons, McCorkle resigned following the 2005 season after compiling a record of four wins and 18 losses during his second tenure.

== Head coaching record ==
=== College ===
Year	Team	Overall	Conference	Standing	Bowl/playoffs
Livingston Tigers (Gulf South Conference) (1985–1990)
1985	Livingston	6–5	4–4	4th	
1986	Livingston	3–8	2–6	T–6th	
1987	Livingston	5–5–1	3–4–1	T–5th	
1988	Livingston	0–11	0–8	9th	
1989	Livingston	3–7–1	1–6–1	8th	
1990	Livingston	3–8	1–7	8th	
Tennessee–Martin Skyhawks (Ohio Valley Conference) (2000–2002)
2000	Tennessee–Martin	2–9	0–7	8th	
2001	Tennessee–Martin	1–10	0–6	7th	
2002	Tennessee–Martin	2–6	0–6	7th	
Tennessee–Martin:		5–25	0–19		
West Alabama Tigers (Gulf South Conference) (2004–2005)
2004	West Alabama	2–9	2–7	T–11th	
2005	West Alabama	2–9	0–9	12th	
Livingston/West Alabama:		24–62–2	13–51–2		
Total:		29–87–2			

== Personal life ==
McCorkle's son, Blaine, is the head football coach for Northwestern State University. Sammy's nephew, Sammy, is the head football coach for Dartmouth College.

== See also ==
- List of college football head coaches with non-consecutive tenure
