= 2024 McNeese Cowboys football team =

American college football season

2024 McNeese Cowboys football
- Conference: Southland Conference
- Record: 6–6 (3–4 Southland)
- Head coach: Gary Goff (3rd season)
- Offensive coordinator: Adam Neugebauer (2nd season)
- Defensive coordinator: Tony Pecoraro (3rd season)
- Home stadium: Cowboy Stadium

2024 Southland Conference football standings
	Conf.			Overall
Team	W		L	W		L
No. 6 Incarnate Word $^	7	–	0	11	–	3
Southeastern Louisiana	6	–	1	7	–	5
Stephen F. Austin	4	–	3	7	–	5
Lamar	4	–	3	7	–	5
McNeese	3	–	4	6	–	6
Houston Christian	3	–	4	5	–	7
East Texas A&M*	2	–	4	3	–	9
Nicholls	2	–	5	4	–	8
Northwestern State	0	–	7	0	–	12
$ – Conference champion; ^ – FCS playoff participant; * – East Texas A&M was ineligible for FCS postseason play due to transition from NCAA Division II.; Rankings from STATS Poll

The 2024 McNeese Cowboys football team represented McNeese State University in the 2024 NCAA Division I FCS football season. The Cowboys played their home games at Cowboy Stadium in Lake Charles, Louisiana, and compete in the Southland Conference. They were led by third–year head coach Gary Goff.

== Preseason ==
=== Preseason poll ===
The Southland Conference released their preseason poll on July 22, 2024. The Cowboys were picked to finish sixth in the conference.

=== Preseason All–Southland Teams ===
The Southland Conference announced the 2024 preseason all-conference football team selections on July 22, 2024. McNeese had a total of three players selected.

Offense

1st Team

- Cole LeClair – Offensive lineman, SR

Defense

1st Team

- Micah Davey – Linebacker, RS-JR

2nd Team

- Levi Wyatt – Defensive back, JR

== Schedule ==
Date	Time	Opponent	Rank	Site	TV	Result	Attendance
August 24	2:30 pm	at No. 21 Tarleton State*		Memorial Stadium; Stephenville, TX	ESPN2	L 23–26	16,125
August 31	7:00 pm	Southern*		Cowboy Stadium; Lake Charles, LA	ESPN+	W 21–7	17,040
September 7	11:45 am	at Texas A&M*		Kyle Field; College Station, TX	SECN	L 10–52	92,345
September 14	7:00 pm	Stephen F. Austin		Cowboy Stadium; Lake Charles, LA	ESPN+	W 28–24	8,223
September 21	7:00 pm	Alcorn State*		Cowboy Stadium; Lake Charles, LA	ESPN+	W 42–14	10,252
September 28	7:00 pm	at No. 25 Weber State*		Stewart Stadium; Ogden, UT	ESPN+	W 28–26	8,941
October 5	6:00 pm	at Houston Christian	No. 22	Husky Stadium; Houston, TX	ESPN+	L 22–43	2,232
October 19	4:00 pm	at No. 14 Incarnate Word		Gayle and Tom Benson Stadium; San Antonio, TX	ESPN+	L 17–30	1,634
October 26	3:00 p.m.	at Nicholls		Guidry Stadium; Thibodaux, LA	ESPN+	L 19–24	6,593
November 2	7:00 pm	Texas A&M–Commerce (Note: Five days after this game, Texas A&M University–Commerce changed its name to East Texas A&M University.)^{†}		Cowboy Stadium; Lake Charles, LA	ESPN+	W 31–3	8,584
November 16	1:00 pm	at Northwestern State		Harry Turpin Stadium; Natchitoches, LA (rivalry)	ESPN+	W 35–3	7,754
November 23	7:00 pm	Lamar		Cowboy Stadium; Lake Charles, LA (Battle of the Border)	ESPN+	L 24–26	7,244
*Non-conference game; ^{†}Homecoming; Rankings from STATS Poll released prior to the game; All times are in Central time

== Game summaries ==
=== at No. 21 Tarleton State ===
Game One – McNeese Cowboys (0-0) vs No.21 Tarleton State Texans (0-0) – Game summary

Quarter	1	2	3	4	Total
Cowboys	7	0	3	13	23
No. 21 Texans	16	10	0	0	26

at Memorial Stadium • Stephenville, TX

- Date: Saturday August 24, 2024
- Game time: 2:30 p.m.
- Game weather: Sunny, 96 °F (36 °C), SE at 9 miles per hour (14 km/h)
- Game attendance: 16,125
- Referee: Matthew Jones
- TV announcers (ESPN2): Lowell Galindo (play-by-play) and Fozzy Whittaker (analyst)

Game information

First quarter

- (11:12) TAR – Michael James 53-yard field goal (Drive: 6 plays, 12 yards, 02:41, Tarleton State 3–0)
- (08:16) MCN – Jamaal Levi 43-yard pass from Clifton McDowell (Tyler Larco kick) (Drive: 8 plays, 43 yards, 02:56, McNeese 7–3)
- (04:09) TAR – Derrel Kelley III 1-yard run (Michael James kick) (Drive: 10 plays, 64 yards, 04:01, Tarleton State 10–7)
- (03:23) TAR – Kasyus Kurns 31-yard fumble recovery (kick failed) (Tarleton State 16–7)

Second quarter

- (07:35) TAR – Keylan Johnson 26-yard pass from Victor Gabalis (Michael James kick) (Drive: 12 plays, 83 yards, 04:34, Tarleton State 23–7)
- (03:10) TAR – Michael James 34-yard field goal (Drive: 6 plays, 38 yards, 03:05, Tarleton State 26–7)

Third quarter

- (00:46) MCN – Tyler Larco 36-yard field goal (Drive: 10 plays, 38 yards, 05:58, Tarleton State 26–10)

Fourth quarter

- (09:32) MCN – D'Angelo Durham 7-yard run (kick failed) (Drive: 9 plays, 72 yards, 00:11, Tarleton State 26–16)
- (04:15) MCN – Matthew McCallister 80-yard pass from Clifton McDowell (Tyler Larco kick) (Drive: 1 play, 80 yards, 00:11, Tarleton State 26–23)

Statistics	MCN	TAR
First downs	20	19
Total yards	66–445	69–339
Rushing yards	46–200	43–195
Passing yards	245	144
Passing: Comp–Att–Int	14—20–1	12–26–0
Time of possession	25:32	34:28

Team	Category	Player	Statistics
McNeese	Passing	Clifton McDowell	13/19, 242 yards, 2 TD, INT
McNeese	Rushing	Clifton McDowell	20 carries, 67 yards
McNeese	Receiving	Matthew McCallister	1 reception, 80 yards, TD
Tarleton State	Passing	Victor Gabelis	11/18, 140 yards, TD
Tarleton State	Rushing	Kayvon Britten	25 carries, 164 yards
Tarleton State	Receiving	Darius Cooper	6 receptions, 85 yards

=== vs. Southern ===
Game Two – Southern Jaguars (0–0) vs McNeese Cowboys (0–1) – Game summary

Quarter	1	2	3	4	Total
Jaguars	0	7	0	0	7
Cowboys	0	0	0	21	21

at Cowboy Stadium, Lake Charles, Louisiana

- Date: Saturday August 31, 2024
- Game time: 7:00 p.m.
- Game weather: Cloudy • Temperature: 83 °F (28 °C) • Wind: E at 14 miles per hour (23 km/h)
- Game attendance: 17,040
- Referee: Edward Bourgeois
- TV announcers (ESPN+): Jeff Palermo (play-by-play) and Chaston Tavaras (analyst)

Game information

First quarter

No scoring plays

Second quarter

- (6:44) SU – Barry Remo 1-yard run, Joshua Griffin kick (Drive: 8 plays, 32 yards, 3:35; Southern 7–0)

Third quarter

No scoring plays

Fourth quarter

- (11:00) MCN – Clifton McDowell 6-yard run, Tyler Larco kick (Drive: 2 plays, 6 yards, 0:39; Tied 7–7)
- (9:24) MCN – Clifton McDowell 1-yard run, Tyler Larco kick (Drive: 3 plays, 2 yards, 0:55; McNeese 14–7)
- (5:04) MCN – D'Angelo Durham 2-yard run, Tyler Larco kick (Drive: 6 plays, 70 yards, 3:23; McNeese 21–7)

Statistics	SOU	MCN
First downs	16	13
Total yards	198	272
Rushing yards	66	164
Passing yards	132	108
Passing: Comp–Att–Int	13–29–1	10–23–0
Time of possession	31:28	28:32

Team	Category	Player	Statistics
Southern	Passing	Noah Bodden	12/26, 118 yards, INT
Southern	Rushing	Kobe Dillion	14 carries, 51 yards
Southern	Receiving	Jermaine Minor Jr.	2 receptions, 37 yards
McNeese	Passing	Kamden Sixkiller	9/19, 80 yards
McNeese	Rushing	D'Angelo Durham	13 carries, 65 yards, TD
McNeese	Receiving	Jer'Michael Carter	1 reception, 28 yards

=== at Texas A&M (FBS) ===
Game Three – McNeese Cowboys (1–1) vs Texas A&M Aggies (FBS) (1–0) – Game summary

Quarter	1	2	3	4	Total
Cowboys	0	0	0	10	10
Aggies (FBS)	14	24	7	7	52

at Kyle Field, College Station, Texas

- Date: Saturday September 7, 2024
- Game time: 11:45 a.m.
- Game weather: Sunny, 82 °F (28 °C)
- Game attendance: 92,345
- Referee: Wayne Winkler
- TV announcers (SECN): Taylor Zarzour (play-by-play), Matt Stinchcomb (analyst), and Alyssa Lang (sideline)

Game information

First quarter

- TAMU – La'Veon Moss 2-yard run (Randy Bond kick), 12:44. Aggies 7–0. Drive: 5 plays, 75 yards, 2:16.
- TAMU – Amari Daniels 2-yard run (Randy Bond kick), 7:19. Aggies 14–0. Drive: 6 plays, 46 yards, 4:11.

Second quarter

- TAMU – La'Veon Moss 6-yard run (Randy Bond kick), 14:20. Aggies 21–0. Drive: 10 plays, 73 yards, 4:33.
- TAMU – Noah Thomas 15-yard pass from Conner Weigman (Randy Bond kick), 10:27. Aggies 28–0. Drive: 7 plays, 35 yards, 3:04.
- TAMU – Moose Muhammad III 3-yard pass from Conner Weigman (Randy Bond kick), 4:36. Aggies 35–0. Drive: 8 plays, 80 yards, 3:50.
- TAMU – Randy Bond 42-yard field goal, 0:44. Aggies 38–0. Drive: 5 plays, 15 yards, 1:46.

Third quarter

- TAMU – Amari Daniels 7-yard run (Randy Bond kick), 5:55. Aggies 45–0. Drive: 10 plays, 92 yards, 4:47.

Fourth quarter

- MCN – Jalen Wright 10-yard pass from Kamden Sixkiller (Tyler Larco kick), 10:25. Aggies 45–7. Drive: 19 plays, 75 yards, 10:30.
- TAMU – Terry Bussey 65-yard run (Randy Bond kick), 10:06. Aggies 52–7. Drive: 1 play, 65 yards, 0:13.
- MCN – Tyler Larco 26-yard field goal, 0:00. Aggies 52–10. Drive: 11 plays, 89 yards, 4:20.

Statistics	MCN	TAMU
First downs	14	29
Total yards	279	529
Rushing yards	180	333
Passing yards	99	196
Passing: Comp–Att–Int	11–21–2	16–25–0
Time of possession	30:23	29:37

Team	Category	Player	Statistics
McNeese	Passing	Kamden Sixkiller	9/19, 80 yards, TD, 2 INT
McNeese	Rushing	Bryce Strong	6 rushes, 64 yards
McNeese	Receiving	Jer'Michael Carter	2 receptions, 23 yards
Texas A&M	Passing	Conner Weigman	11/14, 125 yards, 2 TD
Texas A&M	Rushing	Le'Veon Moss	9 rushes, 84 yards, 2 TD
Texas A&M	Receiving	Cyrus Allen	5 receptions, 72 yards

=== vs. Stephen F. Austin ===
Game Four – Stephen F. Austin Lumberjacks (1–1) vs McNeese Cowboys (1–2) – Game summary

Quarter	1	2	3	4	Total
Lumberjacks	0	10	14	0	24
Cowboys	0	7	7	14	28

at Cowboy Stadium, Lake Charles, Louisiana

- Date: Saturday September 14, 2024
- Game time: 7:00 p.m.
- Game weather: Sunny • Temperature: 87 °F (31 °C) • Wind: SW at 9 miles per hour (14 km/h)
- Game attendance: 8,223
- Referee: James Brookhart
- TV announcers (ESPN+): Jeff Palermo (play-by-play) and Chaston Tavares (analyst)

Game information

First quarter

No scoring plays

Second quarter

- (5:22) SFA – Chris Campos 31-yard field goal (Drive: 14 plays, 61 yards, 5:43; Stephen F. Austin 3–0)
- (3:04) SFA – Anthony Williams 33-yard pass from Sam Vidlak, Chris Campos kick (Drive: 1 play, 33 yards, 0:08; Stephen F. Austin 10–0)
- (0:00) MCN – Jihad Marks 54-yard pass from Clifton McDowell, Tyler Larco kick (Drive: 1 play, 54 yards, 0:03; Stephen F. Austin 10–7)

Third quarter

- (11:30) SFA – Blaine Green 24-yard pass from Sam Vidlak, Chris Campos kick (Drive: 9 plays, 75 yards, 3:30; Stephen F. Austin 17–7)
- (9:08) MCN – Jessie Campbell 23-yard pass from Clifton McDowell, Tyler Larco kick (Drive: 5 plays, 84 yards, 2:16; Stephen F. Austin 17–14)
- (4:37) SFA – Isaiah Davis 61-yard pass from Sam Vidlak, Chris Campos kick (Drive: 5 plays, 85 yards, 2:18; Stephen F. Austin 24–14)

Fourth quarter

- (8:03) MCN – Clifton McDowell 6-yard run, Tyler Larco kick (Drive: 12 plays, 75 yards, 5:00; Stephen F. Austin 24–21)
- (0:31) MCN – Clifton McDowell 11-yard run, Tyler Larco kick (Drive: 12 plays, 80 yards, 4:14; McNeese 28–24)

Statistics	SFA	MCN
First downs	24	19
Total yards	453	449
Rushing yards	212	136
Passing yards	241	313
Passing: Comp–Att–Int	18–28–1	18–29–0
Time of possession	29:51	30:09

Team	Category	Player	Statistics
Stephen F. Austin	Passing	Sam Vidlak	18/28, 241 yards, 3 TD, INT
Stephen F. Austin	Rushing	Qualan Jones	27 carries, 155 yards
Stephen F. Austin	Receiving	Isaiah Davis	3 receptions, 87 yards, TD
McNeese	Passing	Clifton McDowell	18/29, 313 yards, 2 TD
McNeese	Rushing	Coleby Hamm	8 carries, 45 yards
McNeese	Receiving	Jer'Michael Carter	5 receptions, 67 yards

=== vs. Alcorn State ===
Game Five – Alcorn State Braves (1–2) vs McNeese Cowboys (2–2) – Game summary

Quarter	1	2	3	4	Total
Braves	0	7	7	0	14
Cowboys	21	7	14	0	42

at Cowboy Stadium, Lake Charles, Louisiana

- Date: Saturday September 21, 2024
- Game time: 7:00 p.m.
- Game weather: Sunny • Temperature: 88 °F (31 °C) • Wind: SE at 7 miles per hour (11 km/h)
- Game attendance: 10,252
- Referee: Tim Davis
- TV announcers (ESPN+): Jeff Palermo (play-by-play) and Chaston Tavares (analyst)

Game information

First quarter

- (14:11) MCN – Kameran Senegal 50-yard pass from Clifton McDowell, Tyler Larco kick (Drive: 1 play, 50 yards, 0:08; McNeese 7–0)
- (8:30) MCN – Joshon Barbie 5-yard run, Tyler Larco kick (Drive: 5 plays, 65 yards, 1:16; McNeese 14–0)
- (1:18) MCN – Jaylen Jackson 0-yard punt return, Tyler Larco kick (McNeese 21–0)

Second quarter

- (0:40) ALC – Tyran Warren 32-yard pass from Xzavier Vaughn, Noah Kiani kick (Drive: 7 plays, 60 yards, 1:13; McNeese 21–7)
- (0:03) MCN – D'Angelo Durham 2-yard run, Tyler Larco kick (Drive: 5 plays, 54 yards, 0:31; McNeese 28–7)

Third quarter

- (7:53) MCN – Clifton McDowell 14-yard run, Tyler Larco kick (Drive: 4 plays, 48 yards, 1:28; McNeese 35–7)
- (4:02) ALC – Xzavier Vaughn 25-yard run, Noah Kiani kick (Drive: 8 plays, 75 yards, 3:51; McNeese 35–14)
- (2:13) MCN – Jer'Michael Carter 5-yard pass from Clifton McDowell, Tyler Larco kick (Drive: 4 plays, 34 yards, 1:49; McNeese 42–14)

Fourth quarter

No scoring plays

Statistics	ALCN	MCN
First downs	21	21
Total yards	421	457
Rushing yards	217	211
Passing yards	204	246
Passing: Comp–Att–Int	16–41–1	16–23–1
Time of possession	33:19	26:41

Team	Category	Player	Statistics
Alcorn State	Passing	Xzavier Vaughn	16/41, 204 yards, TD, INT
Alcorn State	Rushing	Xzavier Vaughn	16 carries, 127 yards, TD
Alcorn State	Receiving	Damien Jones	7 receptions, 105 yards
McNeese	Passing	Clifton McDowell	15/21, 229 yards, 2 TD, INT
McNeese	Rushing	Clifton McDowell	8 carries, 76 yards, TD
McNeese	Receiving	Jonathan Harris	5 receptions, 60 yards

=== at No. 25 Weber State ===
Game Six – McNeese Cowboys (3–2) vs No. 25 Weber State Wildcats (2–2) – Game summary

Quarter	1	2	3	4	Total
Cowboys	0	0	0	0	0
No. 25 Wildcats	0	0	0	0	0

at Stewart Stadium, Ogden, Utah

- Date: Saturday September 28, 2024
- Game time: 7:00 p.m. CDT
- TV announcers (ESPN+): TBD

Game information

First quarter
Second quarter
Third quarter
Fourth quarter

Statistics	MCN	WEB
First downs		
Total yards		
Rushing yards		
Passing yards		
Passing: Comp–Att–Int		
Time of possession		

Team	Category	Player	Statistics
McNeese	Passing		
McNeese	Rushing		
McNeese	Receiving		
Weber State	Passing		
Weber State	Rushing		
Weber State	Receiving		

=== at Houston Christian ===
Game Seven – No. 22 McNeese Cowboys (4–2) vs Houston Christian Huskies (2–3) – Game summary

Quarter	1	2	3	4	Total
No. 22 Cowboys	0	0	0	0	0
Huskies	0	0	0	0	0

at Husky Stadium, Houston, Texas

- Date: Saturday October 5, 2024
- Game time: 6:00 PM
- TV announcers (ESPN+): TBD

Game information

First quarter
Second quarter
Third quarter
Fourth quarter

Statistics	MCN	HCU
First downs		
Total yards		
Rushing yards		
Passing yards		
Passing: Comp–Att–Int		
Time of possession		

Team	Category	Player	Statistics
McNeese	Passing		
McNeese	Rushing		
McNeese	Receiving		
Houston Christian	Passing		
Houston Christian	Rushing		
Houston Christian	Receiving		

=== at No. 14 Incarnate Word ===
Game Eight – McNeese Cowboys (4–3) vs No. 14 Incarnate Word Cardinals (4–2) – Game summary

Quarter	1	2	3	4	Total
Cowboys	7	3	7	0	17
No. 14 Cardinals	0	13	14	3	30

at Gayle and Tom Benson Stadium, San Antonio, Texas

- Date: Saturday October 19, 2024
- Game time: 4:00 PM
- Game weather: Sunny, 85 °F (29 °C)
- Game attendance: 1,634
- Referee: Matt Bech
- TV announcers (ESPN+): Karl Schoening (play-by-play), Sam Kaman (analyst) and Blair Villarreal (sideline)

Game information

First quarter

- MCN – 1:54 Jer'Michael Carter 36 yard pass from Kamden Sixkiller, Tyler Larco kick
  MCN 7–0 Drive: 5 plays, 50 yards, 1:54

Second quarter

- UIW – 10:18 Brack Peacock 26 yard field goal
  MCN 7–3 Drive: 19 plays, 56 yards, 6:27
- UIW – 3:57 Zach Calzada 15 yard run, Brack Peacock kick
  UIW 10–7 Drive: 10 plays, 68 yards, 4:24
- MCN – 1:45 Tyler Larco 35 yard field goal
  Tied 10–10 Drive: 7 plays, 57 yards, 2:12
- UIW – 0:12 Brack Peacock 30 yard field goal
  UIW 13–10 Drive: 9 plays, 63 yards, 1:33

Third quarter

- UIW – 12:57 Dekalon Taylor 7 yard run, Brack Peacock kick
  UIW 20–10 Drive: 6 plays, 36 yards, 1:53
- UIW – 8:35 Jalen Walthall 28 yard pass from Richard Torres, Brack Peacock kick
  UIW 27–10 Drive: 4 plays, 37 yards, 1:36
- MCN – 3:03 Joshon Barbie 38 yard run, Tyler Larco kick
  UIW 27–16 Drive: 5 plays, 85 yards, 2:00

Fourth quarter

- UIW – 12:16 Brack Peacock 28 yard field goal
  UIW 30–16 Drive: 14 plays, 60 yards, 5:47

Statistics	MCN	UIW
First downs	15	24
Total yards	324	424
Rushing yards	105	182
Passing yards	219	242
Passing: Comp–Att–Int	21–36–0	23–44–1
Time of possession	23:30	36:30

Team	Category	Player	Statistics
McNeese	Passing	Kamden Sixkiller	21/36, 219 yards, 1 TD
McNeese	Rushing	Joshon Barbie	10 carries, 59 yards, 1 TD
McNeese	Receiving	Jer'Michael Carter	3 receptions, 56 yards, 1 TD
Incarnate Word	Passing	Zach Calzada	21/42, 204 yards, 1 INT
Incarnate Word	Rushing	Dekalon Taylor	25 carries, 103 yards, 1 TD
Incarnate Word	Receiving	Josh Lorick	5 receptions, 76 yards

=== at Nicholls ===
Game Nine – McNeese Cowboys (4–4) vs Nicholls Colonels (3–4) – Game summary

Quarter	1	2	3	4	Total
Cowboys	0	0	0	0	0
Colonels	0	0	0	0	0

at Guidry Stadium, Thibodaux, Louisiana

- Date: Saturday October 26, 2024
- Game time: 3:00 PM
- TV announcers (ESPN+): TBD

Game information

First quarter
Second quarter
Third quarter
Fourth quarter

Statistics	MCN	NICH
First downs		
Total yards		
Rushing yards		
Passing yards		
Passing: Comp–Att–Int		
Time of possession		

Team	Category	Player	Statistics
McNeese	Passing		
McNeese	Rushing		
McNeese	Receiving		
Nicholls	Passing		
Nicholls	Rushing		
Nicholls	Receiving		

=== vs. Texas A&M–Commerce ===
Game Ten – Texas A&M–Commerce Lions (1–7) vs McNeese Cowboys (4–5) – Game summary

Quarter	1	2	3	4	Total
Lions	0	0	0	0	0
Cowboys	0	0	0	0	0

at Cowboy Stadium, Lake Charles, Louisiana

- Date: Saturday November 2, 2024
- Game time: 7:00 p.m.
- TV announcers (ESPN+): TBD

Game information

First quarter
Second quarter
Third quarter
Fourth quarter

Statistics	TAMC	MCN
First downs		
Total yards		
Rushing yards		
Passing yards		
Passing: Comp–Att–Int		
Time of possession		

Team	Category	Player	Statistics
Texas A&M-Commerce	Passing		
Texas A&M-Commerce	Rushing		
Texas A&M-Commerce	Receiving		
McNeese	Passing		
McNeese	Rushing		
McNeese	Receiving		

=== at Northwestern State (rivalry) ===
Game Eleven – McNeese Cowboys (5–5) vs Northwestern State Demons (0–10) – Game summary

Quarter	1	2	3	4	Total
Cowboys	0	14	14	7	35
Demons	0	3	0	0	3

at Harry Turpin Stadium, Natchitoches, Louisiana

- Date: Saturday November 16, 2024
- Game time: 1:00 p.m.
- Game weather: Sunny • Temperature: 75 °F (24 °C) • Wind: SE at 1 mile per hour (1.6 km/h)
- Game attendance: 7,754
- Referee: Gary Leeper
- TV announcers (ESPN+): Patrick Netherton (play-by-play) and Gary Reasons (analyst)

Game information

First quarter

No scoring plays

Second quarter

- MCN – Coleby Hamm 2-yard run (Tyler Larco kick), 11:57. Cowboys 7–0. Drive: 7 plays, 42 yards, 2:58.
- NSU – Reed Honshtein 25-yard field goal, 8:31. Cowboys 7–3. Drive: 7 plays, 58 yards, 3:14.
- MCN – Logan Mauldin 2-yard pass from Alex Flores (Tyler Larco kick), 0:29. Cowboys 14–3. Drive: 13 plays, 91 yards, 3:39.

Third quarter

- MCN – Bryce Strong 16-yard run (Tyler Larco kick), 10:53. Cowboys 21–3. Drive: 3 plays, 27 yards, 0:59.
- MCN – Joshon Barbie 25-yard pass from Jamaal Levi (Tyler Larco kick), 5:30. Cowboys 28–3. Drive: 6 plays, 74 yards, 2:07.

Fourth quarter

- MCN – Bryce Strong 1-yard run (Deaglan Camron kick), 1:53. Cowboys 35–3. Drive: 10 plays, 75 yards, 4:59.

Statistics	MCN	NWST
First downs	24	9
Total yards	440	157
Rushing yards	314	61
Passing yards	126	96
Passing: Comp–Att–Int	14–23–3	10–20–2
Time of possession	28:35	31:25

Team	Category	Player	Statistics
McNeese	Passing	Alex Flores	8/14, 62 yards, TD, 2 INT
McNeese	Rushing	Joshon Barbie	22 carries, 139 yards
McNeese	Receiving	Jessie Campbell III	3 receptions, 34 yards
Northwestern State	Passing	Abram Johnston	5/14, 87 yards, INT
Northwestern State	Rushing	Ray McKneely-Harris	7 carries, 22 yards
Northwestern State	Receiving	Ray McKneely-Harris	1 reception, 54 yards

=== vs. Lamar (Battle of the Border) ===
Game Twelve – Lamar Cardinals (7–5; 4–3) at McNeese Cowboys (6–6; 3–4) – Game summary

Quarter	1	2	3	4	Total
Cardinals	10	7	3	6	26
Cowboys	0	7	3	14	24

at Cowboy Stadium, Lake Charles, Louisiana

- Date: Saturday November 23, 2024
- Game time: 7:00 p.m.
- Game weather: Wind: SE 10mph • Weather: Clear • Temp: 55
- Game attendance: 7,244
- Referee: Edward Bourgeois
- TV: ESPN+
- Box score

Game information

First Quarter

- LU – 8:52 Carver, RJ 2 yd run (Woodard, Ben kick),
  LU 7–0 Drive: 4 plays, 58 yards, 2:26
- LU – 3:01 Woodard, Ben 35 yd field goal
  LU 10–0 Drive: 10 plays, 40 yards, 3:54

Second Quarter

- LU – 6:10 Rhea, Sevonne 41 yd pass from Coleman, Robert (Woodard, Ben kick)
  LU 17–0 Drive: 5 plays, 73 yards, 2:18
- MCN – 2:47 Barbie, Joshon 1 yd run (Larco, Tyler kick)
  LU 17–7 Drive: 11 plays, 75 yards, 3:23

Third Quarter

- MCN – 6:14 Larco, Tyler 23 yd field goal
  LU 17–10 Drive: 10 plays, 31 yards, 4:09
- LU – 2:30 Woodard, Ben 25 yd field goal
  LU 20–10 Drive: 8 play, 40 yards, 3:37

Fourth Quarter

- MCN – 4:16 Carter, Jer'Michael 15 yd pass from Flores, Alex (Larco, Tyler kick)
  LU 20–17 Drive: 5 plays, 58 yards, 1:04
- MCN – 1:45 Lippold, Devin 3 yd run (Larco, Tyler kick)
  MCN 20–24 Drive: 6 plays, 32 yards, 2:14
- LU – 0:01 Fuselier, Kyndon 5 yd pass from Longino, Jakolby ( )
  LU 26–24 Drive: 13 plays, 77 yards, 1:37

Statistics	LAM	MCN
First downs	24	22
Total yards	404	386
Rushing yards	247	130
Passing yards	157	256
Passing: Comp–Att–Int	12–26–0	24–34–0
Time of possession	27:43	32:16

Team	Category	Player	Statistics
Lamar	Passing	Robert Coleman	8/15, 100 yards, 1 TD
Lamar	Rushing	RJ Carver	22 carries, 122 yards, 1 TD
Lamar	Receiving	Kyndon Fuselier	5 receptions, 69 yards, 1 TD
McNeese	Passing	Alex Flores	24/34, 256 yards, 1 TD
McNeese	Rushing	Joshon Barbie	24 carries, 98 yards, 1 TD
McNeese	Receiving	Jer'Michael Carter	6 receptions, 77 yards, 1 TD
