= 2024 Northwestern State Demons football team =

American college football season

2024 Northwestern State Demons football
- Conference: Southland Conference
- Record: 0–12 (0–7 Southland)
- Head coach: Blaine McCorkle (1st season)
- Offensive coordinator: Norman Joseph (1st season)
- Offensive scheme: Spread
- Defensive coordinator: Matt Conner (1st season)
- Base defense: 3–4
- Home stadium: Harry Turpin Stadium

2024 Southland Conference football standings
	Conf.			Overall
Team	W		L	W		L
No. 6 Incarnate Word $^	7	–	0	11	–	3
Southeastern Louisiana	6	–	1	7	–	5
Stephen F. Austin	4	–	3	7	–	5
Lamar	4	–	3	7	–	5
McNeese	3	–	4	6	–	6
Houston Christian	3	–	4	5	–	7
East Texas A&M*	2	–	4	3	–	9
Nicholls	2	–	5	4	–	8
Northwestern State	0	–	7	0	–	12
$ – Conference champion; ^ – FCS playoff participant; * – East Texas A&M was ineligible for FCS postseason play due to transition from NCAA Division II.; Rankings from STATS Poll

The 2024 Northwestern State Demons football team represented Northwestern State University as a member of the Southland Conference during the 2024 NCAA Division I FCS football season. Led by first-year head coach Blaine McCorkle, the Demons played home games at Harry Turpin Stadium in Natchitoches, Louisiana.

== Preseason ==
=== Preseason poll ===
The Southland Conference released their preseason poll on July 22, 2024. The Demons were picked to finish last in the conference.

== Schedule ==
Date	Time	Opponent	Site	TV	Result	Attendance
August 29	7:00 pm	at Tulsa*	H. A. Chapman Stadium; Tulsa, OK	ESPN+	L 28–62	16,483
September 7	6:00 pm	Prairie View A&M*	Harry Turpin Stadium; Natchitoches, LA	ESPN+	L 31–37	9,132
September 12	6:30 pm	at South Alabama*	Hancock Whitney Stadium; Mobile, AL	ESPN+	L 10–87	16,023
September 21	6:00 pm	Weber State*	Harry Turpin Stadium; Natchitoches, LA	ESPN+	L 0–39	6,736
September 28	3:00 pm	at No. 13 Southeast Missouri State*	Houck Stadium; Cape Girardeau, MO	ESPN+	L 0–19	N/A
October 5	7:00 pm	at Stephen F. Austin	Homer Bryce Stadium; Nacogdoches, TX (Chief Caddo)	ESPN+	L 17–59	5,793
October 12	2:00 pm	Texas A&M–Commerce	Harry Turpin Stadium; Natchitoches, LA	ESPN+	L 21–42	4,737
October 19	11:00 am	at Nicholls	John L. Guidry Stadium; Thibodaux, LA (NSU Challenge)	ESPN+	L 0–20	5,494
October 26	2:00 pm	Lamar^{†}	Harry Turpin Stadium; Natchitoches, LA	ESPN+	L 10–42	6,865
November 9	6:00 pm	at Southeastern Louisiana	Strawberry Stadium; Hammond, LA (rivalry)	ESPN+	L 0–41	3,321
November 16	1:00 pm	McNeese	Harry Turpin Stadium; Natchitoches, LA (rivalry)	ESPN+	L 3–35	7,754
November 23	2:00 pm	at Houston Christian	Husky Stadium; Houston, TX	ESPN+	L 24–62	1,783
*Non-conference game; ^{†}Homecoming; Rankings from STATS Poll released prior to the game; All times are in Central time

== Personnel ==
2024 Northwestern State Demons football team roster
Players
Coaches
Offense

Pos.	#	Name	Class
WR	1	Twon Hines	Sr
RB	2	Kennieth Lacy	Sr
WR	3	Myles Kent-Denton	Sr
WR	4	Ke'Nard King	Sr
WR	5	Amaaz Eugene	Fr
WR	6	Ty Moore	Jr
QB	7	Kareame Cotton Jr.	Jr
QB	8	Quaterius Hawkins	Sr
WR	9	Camryn Davis	Fr
QB	10	Abram Johnston	Fr
WR	11	Dane Wallace	Jr
QB	14	J. T. Fayard	Fr
QB	16	Kekahi Graham	So
TE/QB	17	Chance Newman	Sr
RB	18	Zay Davis	Jr
QB	19	Garrett Graves	Fr
RB	20	Ray McKneely-Harris	Fr
RB	21	Kolbe Burrell	Jr
RB	25	Jeremiah James	Fr
RB	27	Ian Vigo	Fr
WR	30	Micah Jernigan	Sr
WR	32	Ben Buisson	Fr
RB	35	SirMichael Veasley	Jr
RB	40	Brian Banks	Fr
FB	42	Matthew Broad	Jr
RB	43	Kyron Angeletti	Fr
WR	45	Jackson Hedrick	Fr
TE	47	Ryan Tyler	Jr
OL	50	Caleb Billiot	So
OL	55	Isaiah Ybarra	So
OL	60	Christian Thibodaux	Fr
OL	61	Joseph Milton Jr.	Fr
OL	62	Eli Little	Fr
OL	63	Landon Vallee	Fr
OL	65	Chris Allen	Fr
OL	69	Nicholas Soileau	So
OL	70	Lawson Champagne	Fr
OL	71	Stevie Ballard	Jr
OL	72	Jay Stroble	Jr
OL	73	Logan Brady	Fr
OL	74	Ryan Larson	Fr
OL	75	Ralee Jackson	Fr
OL	77	Guadalupe Cedillo	Jr
WR	81	Kody Finley	So
WR	82	John Barr	Fr
TE	84	Joseph Moreland	Fr
WR	86	Jackson Chiasson	Fr
TE	87	Trevon Bradford	Fr
TE	88	Matt Gower	Fr
FB	89	Liam Cohen	So

Defense

Pos.	#	Name	Class
LB	0	Cam George	Jr
LB	1	Hayden Jenkins	Fr
CB	3	Caesar Magee III	Jr
CB	4	D. J. Johnson	So
LB	5	Blake Gotcher	Jr
S	7	Ara Rauls III	Jr
S	8	Gylen Ford	Fr
S	9	Cam Hardy	Jr
DE	13	Jeremiah Bodwin	Jr
CB	15	Ty Hall	Jr
S	16	William White	Jr
CB	19	Brennon Thompson	Fr
S	20	Jeremiah Keppard	Fr
CB	21	Ja'Marion Bonner	Fr
S	22	Christian Williams	Jr
LB	23	Jackson King	Fr
S	25	Isaiah Robinson	Jr
FB	26	Ty Olivier	Fr
CB	28	Antonio Hall	Fr
CB	30	Troy Santa Marina Jr.	Fr
LB	33	Landry Huddleston	Jr
S	36	Kaden Mackey	Fr
S	37	Keelan Preston	Jr
CB	38	Jason Blackwell II	Fr
DL	39	Ford Clark	Fr
S	40	Brian "BJ" Young	Fr
DE	42	Braden Woods	Fr
LB	45	Danny Sears	So
S	48	Joe Natali	Fr
LB	49	Christian Hawkins	Jr
DT	50	Atravon Bossier	Jr
DL	51	Chad Gooden Jr.	So
LB	51	Andre Williams	Fr
DE	53	Kaine Olivier	Fr
DE	54	Kemarion Ivory	Fr
LB	58	Jayden Cook	Fr
LB	59	Corian Heath	So
DE	90	Chancellor Owens	Fr
DL	91	Michael C. Nixon	Fr
DL	92	Sam Kirsch	Fr
DT	95	Johnny Mitchell	Jr
DL	97	Brock Reddic	Fr
DL	98	Tyler Lewis	Jr
DT	99	Ke'shawn Reed	Fr

Special teams

Pos.	#	Name	Class
K	29	Brett Money	Jr
K, P	43	Reed Honshtein	Sr
K, P	46	Scotty Roblow	Sr
LS	48	Sawyer Benson	So
LS	67	Jack Devens	Fr
K, P	83	Evan Kern	So

Head coach

- Blaine McCorkle

Coordinators/assistant coaches

- Matt Conner
  Defensive coordinator
- Norman Joseph
  Offensive coordinator/Quarterbacks
- Pat Bastien
  Defensive backs
- Cade Camp
  Offensive line
- Chris Gistorb
  Defensive line
- Carson Stewart
  Wide receivers/Recruiting coordinator
- Justin Williamson
  Linebackers
- Maurice Stewart
  Running backs
- Tyrius "TJ" Hersey
  Defensive backs graduate assistant
- Kendrioun Boatman
  Offensive line graduate assistant
- Andrew Norton
  Special teams/Defensive graduate assistant
- Darrin Peterson Jr.
  Tight ends and fullbacks graduate assistant

Legend

- (C) Team captain
- (S) Suspended
- (I) Ineligible
- Injured
- Redshirt

Roster
Last update: November 28, 2024

== Game summaries ==
=== at Tulsa (FBS) ===
Northwestern State Demons at Tulsa Golden Hurricane (FBS) – Game summary

Quarter	1	2	3	4	Total
Demons	14	0	0	14	28
Golden Hurricane (FBS)	14	27	7	14	62

at H. A. Chapman Stadium, Tulsa, Oklahoma

- Date: August 29
- Game time: 7:00 p.m. CDT
- Game weather: Sunny, 91 °F (33 °C)
- Game attendance: 16,483
- Referee: Steven Anderson
- TV announcers (ESPN+): James Westling and Leger Douzable
- Box score, Recap

Game information

First quarter

- NWST – Kennieth Lacy 75-yard run (Reed Honshtein kick), 14:13. Demons 7–0. Drive: 2 plays, 75 yards, 0:47.
- TLSA – Kamdyn Benjamin 36-yard pass from Kirk Francis (Seth Morgan kick), 9:40. Tied 7–7. Drive: 7 plays, 80 yards, 2:11.
- TLSA – Kamdyn Benjamin 66-yard punt return (Seth Morgan kick), 7:19. Golden Hurricane 14–7.
- NWST – Antonio Hall 74-yard missed field goal return (Reed Honshtein kick), 1:06. Tied 14–14.

Second quarter

- TLSA – Jeremiah Ballard 29-yard pass from Kirk Francis (Seth Morgan kick), 12:34. Golden Hurricane 21–14. Drive: 9 plays, 73 yards, 3:03.
- TLSA – Anthony Watkins 33-yard run (kick failed), 7:45. Golden Hurricane 27–14. Drive: 2 plays, 41 yards, 0:44.
- TLSA – Connor Vaughn 20-yard pass from Kirk Francis (Seth Morgan kick), 4:16. Golden Hurricane 34–14. Drive: 5 plays, 52 yards, 2:23.
- TLSA – Connor Vaughn 14-yard pass from Kirk Francis (Seth Morgan kick), 0:37. Golden Hurricane 41–14. Drive: 7 plays, 65 yards, 2:05.

Third quarter

- TLSA – Braylin Presley 19-yard run (Seth Morgan kick), 11:22. Golden Hurricane 48–14. Drive: 7 plays, 75 yards, 3:38.

Fourth quarter

- NWST – Myles Kitt-Denton 12-yard pass from Quaterius Hawkins (Reed Honshtein kick), 14:39. Golden Hurricane 48–21. Drive: 2 plays, 12 yards, 0:13.
- TLSA – Lloyd Avant 100-yard kickoff return (Seth Morgan kick), 14:28. Golden Hurricane 55–21.
- NWST – Chance Newman 4-yard run (Reed Honshtein kick), 10:29. Golden Hurricane 55–28. Drive: 7 plays, 76 yards, 3:52.
- TLSA – Cardell Williams 22-yard run (Seth Morgan kick), 4:30. Golden Hurricane 62–28. Drive: 10 plays, 73 yards, 5:59.

Statistics	NWST	TLSA
First downs	12	31
Total yards	243	622
Rushing yards	131	323
Passing yards	112	299
Turnovers	0	1
Time of possession	28:30	31:30

Team	Category	Player	Statistics
Northwestern State	Passing	Quaterius Hawkins	4/5, 57 yards, TD
Northwestern State	Rushing	Kennieth Lacy	7 carries, 72 yards, TD
Northwestern State	Receiving	Amaaz Eugene	2 receptions, 34 yards
Tulsa	Passing	Kirk Francis	23/30, 299 yards, 4 TD
Tulsa	Rushing	Lloyd Avant	11 carries, 64 yards
Tulsa	Receiving	Zion Steptoe	5 receptions, 88 yards

=== Prairie View A&M ===
Prairie View A&M Panthers at Northwestern State Demons – Game summary

Quarter	1	2	3	4	Total
Panthers	10	10	10	7	37
Demons	14	0	7	10	31

at Harry Turpin Stadium, Natchitoches, Louisiana

- Date: September 7
- Game time: 6:00 p.m. CDT
- Game weather: Cloudy, 79 °F (26 °C)
- Game attendance: 9,132
- Referee: Matt Beck
- TV announcers (ESPN+): Patrick Netherton (play-by-play) and Tyler Moody (analyst)
- Box score, Recap

Game information
First quarter
- NWST – Myles Kitt-Denton 71-yard pass from J. T. Fayard (Reed Honshtein kick), 14:46. Demons 7–0. Drive: 1 play, 71 yards, 0:09.
- PV – Albert Thomas 42-yard pass from Cameron Peters (Guillermo Garcia Rodriguez kick), 9:12. Tied 7–7. Drive: 5 plays, 55 yards, 1:50.
- NWST – Emanuel Brown 37-yard interception return (Reed Honshtein kick), 5:19. Demons 14–7.
- PV – Guillermo Garcia Rodriguez 34-yard field goal, 1:08. Demons 14–10. Drive: 8 plays, 62 yards, 4:05.

Second quarter

- PV – Connor Wishman 5-yard run (Guillermo Garcia Rodriguez kick), 12:31. Panthers 17–14. Drive: 4 plays, 51 yards, 2:14.
- PV – Guillermo Garcia Rodriguez 22-yard field goal, 2:53. Panthers 20–14. Drive: 14 plays, 60 yards, 5:41.

Third quarter

- NWST – Kennieth Lacy 55-yard run (Reed Honshtein kick), 11:17. Demons 21–20. Drive: 2 plays, 55 yards, 0:43.
- PV – Shemar Savage 4-yard pass from Cameron Peters (Guillermo Garcia Rodriguez kick), 6:05. Panthers 27–21. Drive: 13 plays, 75 yards, 5:12.
- PV – Guillermo Garcia Rodriguez 41-yard field goal, 0:25. Panthers 30–21. Drive: 10 plays, 44 yards, 3:49.

Fourth quarter

- NWST – Cadillac Rhone 16-yard interception return (Reed Honshtein kick), 13:38. Panthers 30–28.
- PV – Lamagea McDowell 18-yard run (Guillermo Garcia Rodriguez kick), 12:02. Panthers 37–28. Drive: 5 plays, 70 yards, 1:36.
- NWST – Reed Honshtein 38-yard field goal, 7:56. Panthers 37–31. Drive: 5 plays, 17 yards, 1:52.

Statistics	PV	NWST
First downs	25	16
Total yards	468	282
Rushing yards	188	105
Passing yards	280	177
Turnovers	3	1
Time of possession	37:29	22:31

Team	Category	Player	Statistics
Prairie View A&M	Passing	Cameron Peters	18/33, 280 yards, 2 TD, 2 INT
Prairie View A&M	Rushing	Connor Wisham	22 rushes, 83 yards, TD
Prairie View A&M	Receiving	Shemar Savage	6 receptions, 133 yards, TD
Northwestern State	Passing	J. T. Fayard	12/31, 177 yards, TD, INT
Northwestern State	Rushing	Kennieth Lacy	9 rushes, 75 yards, TD
Northwestern State	Receiving	Myles Kitt-Denton	3 receptions, 103 yards, TD

=== at South Alabama (FBS) ===
Northwestern State Demons at South Alabama Jaguars (FBS) – Game summary

Quarter	1	2	3	4	Total
Demons	10	0	0	0	10
Jaguars (FBS)	24	28	28	7	87

at Hancock Whitney Stadium, Mobile, Alabama

- Date: September 12
- Game time: 6:30 p.m. CDT
- Game weather: Cloudy, 85 °F (29 °C)
- Game attendance: 16,023
- Referee: Tim Barker
- TV announcers (ESPN+): Pat Greenwood (play-by-play) and Brian Genard (analyst)
- Box score, Recap

Game information

First quarter

- USA – Jamaal Pritchett 62-yard punt return (Laith Marjan kick), 13:24. Jaguars 7–0
- USA – Jeremiah Webb 39-yard pass from Gio Lopez (Laith Marjan kick), 10:58. Jaguars 14–0. Drive: 1 play, 39 yards, 0:08.
- NWST – Reed Honshtein 31-yard field goal, 7:30. Jaguars 14–3. Drive 8 plays, 61 yards, 3:28.
- USA – DJ Thomas-Jones 12-yard pass from Gio Lopez (Laith Marjan kick), 5:07. Jaguars 21–3. Drive: 5 plays, 72 yards, 2:23.
- USA – Laith Marjan 28-yard field goal, 0:03. Jaguars 24–3. Drive: 9 plays, 63 yards, 4:07.
- NWST – Myles Kitt-Denton 75-yard pass from J. T. Fayard (Reed Honshtein kick), 0:00. Jaguars 24–10. Drive: 1 play, 75 yards, 0:04.

Second quarter

- USA – Kentrel Bullock 1-yard run (Laith Marjan kick), 13:15. Jaguars 31–10. Drive: 5 plays, 75 yards, 1:45.
- USA – Fluff Bothwell 7-yard run (Laith Marjan kick), 10:15. Jaguars 38–10. Drive: 3 plays, 43 yards, 1:21.
- USA – D. J. Thomas-Jones 4-yard pass from Gio Lopez (Laith Marjan kick), 9:25. Jaguars 45–10. Drive: 1 play, 4 yards, 0:07.
- USA – Fluff Bothwell 5-yard run (Laith Marjan kick), 2:04. Jaguars 52–10. Drive: 2 plays, 62 yards, 0:41.

Third quarter

- USA – Kentrel Bullock 59-yard run (Laith Marjan kick), 14:18. Jaguars 59–10. Drive: 2 plays, 70 yards, 0:38.
- USA – Jamaal Pritchett 10-yard pass from Gio Lopez (Davis Little kick), 6:48. Jaguars 66–10. Drive: 9 plays, 59 yards, 3:41.
- USA – P. J. Martin 4-yard run (Davis Little kick), 2:40. Jaguars 73–10. Drive: 4 plays, 51 yards, 2:10.
- USA – Chrystyile Caldwell 30-yard interception return (Davis Little kick), 0:55. Jaguars 80–10.

Fourth quarter

- USA – Jarvis Durr 4-yard run (Davis Little kick), 3:57. Jaguars 87–10. Drive: 5 plays, 22 yards, 11:48.

Statistics	NWST	USA
First downs	8	22
Total yards	237	620
Rushing yards	66	363
Passing yards	171	257
Turnovers	4	0
Time of possession	26:47	33:13

Team	Category	Player	Statistics
Northwestern State	Passing	J. T. Fayard	9/23, 165 yards, TD, 2 INT
Northwestern State	Rushing	Zay Davis	9 rushes, 32 yards
Northwestern State	Receiving	Myles Kitt-Denton	3 receptions, 80 yards, TD
South Alabama	Passing	Gio Lopez	15/19, 257 yards, 4 TD
South Alabama	Rushing	Fluff Bothwell	7 rushes, 143 yards, 2 TD
South Alabama	Receiving	Jeremiah Webb	2 receptions, 74 yards, TD

The fourth quarter was shortened to six minutes as South Alabama was up 80–10 at the end of the third.

=== Weber State ===
Weber State Wildcats at Northwestern State Demons – Game summary

Quarter	1	2	3	4	Total
Wildcats	10	17	9	3	39
Demons	0	0	0	0	0

at Harry Turpin Stadium, Natchitoches, Louisiana

- Date: September 21
- Game time: 5:00 p.m. CDT
- Game weather: Sunny, 92 °F (33 °C)
- Game attendance: 6,736
- Referee: James Brookhart
- TV announcers (ESPN+): Patrick Netherton (play-by-play) and Gary Reasons (analyst)
- Box score, Recap

Game information
First quarter
- WEB – Kyle Thompson 29-yard field goal, 4:22. Wildcats 3–0. Drive: 8 plays, 52 yards, 3:14.
- WEB – Jacob Sharp 35-yard pass from Richie Munoz (Sloan Calder kick), 0:19. Wildcats 10–0. Drive: 2 plays, 50 yards, 0:37.

Second quarter

- WEB – Damon Bankston 7-yard run (Sloan Calder kick), 10:47. Wildcats 17–0. Drive: 9 plays, 60 yards, 3:21.
- WEB – Sloan Calder 28-yard field goal, 5:28. Wildcats 20–0. Drive: 9 plays, 29 yards, 3:01.
- WEB – Jaden Thrower 17-yard pass from Richie Munoz (Sloan Calder kick), 2:40. Wildcats 27–0. Drive: 3 plays, 81 yards, 1:10.

Third quarter

- WEB – Jayleen Record 33-yard pass from Richie Munoz (Sloan Calder kick), 12:14. Wildcats 34–0. Drive: 5 plays, 60 yards, 2:41.
- WEB – J. T. Fayard tackled in own end zone, 7:57. Wildcats 36–0.

Fourth quarter

- WEB – Sloan Calder 20-yard field goal, 10:53. Wildcats 39–0. Drive: 10 plays, 52 yards, 4:01.

Statistics	WEB	NWST
First downs	20	9
Total yards	433	157
Rushing yards	106	84
Passing yards	327	73
Turnovers	1	1
Time of possession	30:27	29:33

Team	Category	Player	Statistics
Weber State	Passing	Richie Munoz	19/31, 327 yards, 3 TD, INT
Weber State	Rushing	Damon Bankston	10 rushes, 56 yards, TD
Weber State	Receiving	Jacob Sharp	8 receptions, 119 yards, TD
Northwestern State	Passing	J. T. Fayard	13/24, 68 yards
Northwestern State	Rushing	Kolbe Burrell	5 rushes, 60 yards
Northwestern State	Receiving	Twon Hines	3 receptions, 27 yards

=== at No. 13 Southeast Missouri State ===
Northwestern State Demons at No. 13 Southeast Missouri State Redhawks – Game summary

Quarter	1	2	3	4	Total
Demons	0	0	0	0	0
No. 13 Redhawks	10	3	3	3	19

at Houck Stadium, Cape Girardeau, Missouri

- Date: September 28
- Game time: 3:00 p.m. CDT
- Game weather: Cloudy, 72 °F (22 °C)
- Referee: Jeremee Tate
- TV announcers (ESPN+): Erik Sean (play-by-play) and Rick Weiser (analyst)
- Box score, Recap

Game information
First quarter
- SEMO – Cam Pedro 10-yard pass from Paxton DeLaurent (D. C. Pippin kick), 9:03. Redhawks 7–0. Drive: 9 plays, 37 yards, 2:44.
- SEMO – D. C. Pippin 30-yard field goal, 5:54. Redhawks 10–0. Drive: 9 plays, 53 yards, 2:46.

Second quarter

- SEMO – D. C. Pippin 38-yard field goal, 7:15. Redhawks 13–0. Drive: 17 plays, 29 yards, 7:39.

Third quarter

- SEMO – D. C. Pippin 37-yard field goal, 11:11. Redhawks 16–0. Drive: 9 plays, 50 yards, 3:39.

Fourth quarter

- SEMO – D. C. Pippin 24-yard field goal, 7:04. Redhawks 19–0. Drive: 12 plays, 50 yards, 6:25.

Statistics	NWST	SEMO
First downs	5	26
Total yards	120	420
Rushing yards	53	183
Passing yards	67	237
Turnovers	0	1
Time of possession	18:15	41:45

Team	Category	Player	Statistics
Northwestern State	Passing	Quaterius Hawkins	5/6, 51 yards
Northwestern State	Rushing	Zay Davis	7 rushes, 16 yards
Northwestern State	Receiving	Travon Jones	3 receptions, 26 yards
Southeast Missouri State	Passing	Paxton DeLaurent	21/43, 237 yards, TD, INT
Southeast Missouri State	Rushing	Darrell Smith	31 rushes, 127 yards
Southeast Missouri State	Receiving	Cam Pedro	4 receptions, 58 yards, TD

=== At Stephen F. Austin (Chief Caddo) ===
Northwestern State Demons at Stephen F. Austin Lumberjacks – Game summary

Quarter	1	2	3	4	Total
Demons	0	3	7	7	17
Lumberjacks	24	14	7	14	59

at Homer Bryce Stadium, Nacogdoches, Texas

- Date: October 5
- Game time: 7:02 p.m. CDT
- Game weather: Sunny, 86 °F (30 °C)
- Game attendance: 5,793
- Referee: Gary Leeper
- TV announcers (ESPN+): Chris Simmons (play-by-play) and Courtnee Garcia Jr. (analyst)
- Box score, Recap

Game information
First quarter
- SFA – Blaine Green 6-yard pass from Sam Vidlak (Chris Campos kick), 12:52. Lumberjacks 7–0. Drive: 3 plays, 12 yards, 1:10.
- SFA – Kylon Harris 7-yard pass from Sam Vidlak (Chris Campos kick), 6:15. Lumberjacks 14–0. Drive: 10 plays, 86 yards, 4:23.
- SFA – Chris Campos 36-yard field goal, 3:33. Lumberjacks 17–0. Drive: 5 plays, 16 yards, 1:09.
- SFA – Qualan Jones 1-yard run (Chris Campos kick), 2:31. Lumberjacks 24–0. Drive: 3 plays, 20 yards, 0:50.

Second quarter

- SFA – Qualan Jones 52-yard run (Chris Campos kick), 14:52. Lumberjacks 31–0. Drive: 4 plays, 78 yards, 0:56.
- NWST – Reed Honshtein 24-yard field goal, 10:25. Lumberjacks 31–3. Drive: 9 plays, 68 yards, 4:27.
- SFA – Jordan Nabors 29-yard pass from Sam Vidlak (Chris Campos kick), 9:04. Lumberjacks 38–3. Drive: 3 plays, 75 yards, 1:14.

Third quarter

- SFA – Kylon Harris 9-yard pass from Sam Vidlak (Chris Campos kick), 12:07. Lumberjacks 45–3. Drive: 8 plays, 84 yards, 2:47.
- NWST – Myles Kitt-Denton 74-yard pass from J. T. Fayard (Reed Honshtein kick), 10:28. Lumberjacks 45–10. Drive: 3 plays, 75 yards, 1:39.

Fourth quarter

- NWST – Matthew Broad 3-yard run (Reed Honshtein kick), 14:57. Lumberjacks 45–17. Drive: 3 plays, 67 yards, 0:58.
- SFA – Tyjuan Atkins 25-yard pass from Gavin Rutherford (Chris Campos kick), 10:40. Lumberjacks 52–17. Drive: 3 plays, 88 yards, 1:22.
- SFA – Kaidan Turner 58-yard fumble return (Chris Campos kick), 6:17. Lumberjacks 59–17.

Statistics	NWST	SFA
First downs	13	24
Total yards	379	623
Rushing yards	49	256
Passing yards	330	367
Turnovers	4	1
Time of possession	30:23	29:37

Team	Category	Player	Statistics
Northwestern State	Passing	J. T. Fayard	18/29, 322 yards, TD, 3 INT
Northwestern State	Rushing	Zay Davis	9 rushes, 55 yards
Northwestern State	Receiving	Kenard King	3 receptions, 83 yards
Stephen F. Austin	Passing	Sam Vidlak	23/29, 307 yards, 4 TD
Stephen F. Austin	Rushing	Jaylen Jenkins	10 rushes, 113 yards
Stephen F. Austin	Receiving	Blaine Green	4 receptions, 100 yards, TD

=== Texas A&M–Commerce ===
Texas A&M–Commerce Lions at Northwestern State – Game summary

Quarter	1	2	3	4	Total
Lions	14	7	14	7	42
Demons	7	0	0	14	21

at Harry Turpin Stadium, Natchitoches, Louisiana

- Date: October 12
- Game time: 2:00 p.m. CDT
- Game weather: Clear, 90 °F (32 °C)
- Game attendance: 4,737
- Referee: Ed Bourgeois
- TV announcers (ESPN+): Patrick Netherton (play-by-play) and Gary Reasons (analyst)
- Box score, Recap

Game information
First quarter
- NWST – Kennieth Lacy 5-yard run (Reed Honshtein kick), 12:21. Demons 7–0. Drive: 1 play, 5 yards, 0:03.
- AMC – Christian Jourdain 30-yard pass from Ron Peace (Luke Jackson kick), 9:21. Tied 7–7. Drive: 6 plays, 80 yards, 2:56.
- AMC – B. K. Jackson 1-yard run (Luke Jackson kick), 2:38. Lions 14–7. Drive: 10 plays, 54 yards, 4:31.

Second quarter

- AMC – Ron Peace 34-yard run (Luke Jackson kick), 1:16. Lions 21–7. Drive: 8 plays, 90 yards, 3:54.

Third quarter

- AMC – Christian Jourdain 22-yard pass from Ron Peace (Luke Jackson kick), 7:40. Lions 28–7. Drive: 5 plays, 75 yards, 2:03.
- AMC – Jordon Hamilton 22-yard pass from Ron Peace (Andy Gallegos kick), 1:54. Lions 35–7. Drive: 4 plays, 36 yards, 0:44.

Fourth quarter

- AMC – Leon Young 4-yard fumble return (Luke Jackson kick), 11:23. Lions 42–7.
- NWST – Kennieth Lacy 2-yard run (Reed Honshtein kick), 5:12. Lions 42–14. Drive: 10 plays, 87 yards, 6:10.
- NWST – Amaaz Eugene 27-yard pass from Abraham Johnston (Reed Honshtein kick), 0:16. Lions 42–21. Drive: 6 plays, 92 yards, 2:01.

Statistics	TAMC	NWST
First downs	21	16
Total yards	439	330
Rushing yards	159	29
Passing yards	280	301
Turnovers	2	3
Time of possession	30:01	29:59

Team	Category	Player	Statistics
Texas A&M–Commerce	Passing	Ron Peace	15/21, 275 yards, 3 TD
Texas A&M–Commerce	Rushing	B. K. Jackson	12 rushes, 62 yards, TD
Texas A&M–Commerce	Receiving	Christian Jourdain	3 receptions, 59 yards, 2 TD
Northwestern State	Passing	Abraham Johnston	14/22, 301 yards, TD, 2 INT
Northwestern State	Rushing	Kennieth Lacy	13 rushes, 43 yards, 2 TD
Northwestern State	Receiving	Amaaz Eugene	5 receptions, 96 yards, TD

=== At Nicholls (NSU Challenge) ===
Northwestern State Demons at Nicholls Colonels – Game summary

Quarter	1	2	3	4	Total
Demons	0	0	0	0	0
Colonels	7	10	3	0	20

at John L. Guidry Stadium, Thibodaux, Louisiana

- Date: October 19
- Game time: 11:00 a.m. CDT
- Game weather: Sunny
- Game attendance: 5,494
- Referee: James Brookhart
- TV announcers (ESPN+): Jack Benjamin (play-by-play) and Wayde Keiser (analyst)
- Box score, Recap

Game information
First quarter
- NICH – Miequle Brock 4-yard pass from Pat McQuaide (Gabe Showalter kick), 2:23. Colonels 7–0. Drive: 12 plays, 73 yards, 5:37.

Second quarter

- NICH – Lee Negrotto 23-yard pass from Pat McQuaide (Gabe Showalter kick), 13:45. Colonels 14–0. Drive: 7 plays, 50 yards, 2:05.
- NICH – Gabe Showalter 35-yard field goal, 1:17. Colonels 17–0. Drive: 7 plays, 31 yards, 1:45.

Third quarter

- NICH – Gabe Showalter 39-yard field goal, 6:48. Colonels 20–0. Drive: 8 plays, 23 yards, 1:51.

Fourth quarter

- No scoring plays

Statistics	NWST	NICH
First downs	5	23
Total yards	46	393
Rushing yards	15	207
Passing yards	31	186
Turnovers	1	0
Time of possession	23:35	36:25

Team	Category	Player	Statistics
Northwestern State	Passing	Quaterius Hawkins	4/6, 19 yards
Northwestern State	Rushing	Reed Honshtein	1 carry, 21 yards
Northwestern State	Receiving	Ty Moore	1 reception, 15 yards
Nicholls	Passing	Pat McQuaide	18/32, 186 yards, 2 TD
Nicholls	Rushing	Collin Guggenheim	23 carries, 129 yards
Nicholls	Receiving	Lee Negrotto	3 receptions, 55 yards, TD

=== Lamar ===
Lamar Cardinals at Northwestern State Demons – Game summary

Quarter	1	2	3	4	Total
Cardinals	7	14	21	0	42
Demons	0	7	0	3	10

at Harry Turpin Stadium, Natchitoches, Louisiana

- Date: October 26
- Game time: 2:00 p.m. CDT
- Game weather: Wind: W 0mph • Weather: Clear • Temp: 88
- Game attendance: 6,865
- Referee: Matt Beck
- TV announcers (ESPN+): Patrick Netherton (play-by-play) and Gary Reasons (analyst)
- Box score, Recap

Game information

First Quarter

- LU – 2:08 Rhea, Sevonne 45 yd pass from Coleman, Robert (Woodard, Ben kick) ,LU 7–0 Drive: 4 plays, 80 yards, 1:38

Second Quarter

- LU – 8:49 Coleman, Robert 1 yd run (Woodard, Ben kick),LU 14–0 Drive: 13 plays, 55 yards, 7:13
- LU – 5:50 Coleman, Robert 2 yd run (Woodard, Ben kick),LU 21–0 Drive: 3 plays, 34 yards, 1:24
- NSU – 0:19 Davis, Zay 5 yd run (Honshtein, Reed kick),LU 21–7 Drive: 6 plays, 80 yards, 0:46

Third Quarter

- LU – 14:03 Dennis, Andre 32 yd pass from Coleman, Robert (Woodard, Ben kick),LU 28–7 Drive: 3 plays, 42 yards, 0:57
- LU – 08:10 Griffin, Khalan 1 yd run (Woodard, Ben kick),LU 35–7 Drive: 8 plays, 71 yards, 4:32
- LU – 05:01 Carver, RJ 11 yd pass from Coleman, Robert (Woodard, Ben kick),LU 42–7 Drive: 2 plays, 11 yards, 0:10

Fourth Quarter

- NSU – 05:17 Honshtein, Reed 27 yd field goal,LU 42–10 Drive: 14 plays, 71 yards, 6:40

Statistics	LAM	NWST
First downs	22	18
Total yards	493	329
Rushing yards	268	98
Passing yards	225	231
Passing: Comp–Att–Int	11-17-0	19-38-2
Time of possession	29:28	30:32

Team	Category	Player	Statistics
Lamar	Passing	Robert Coleman	8/14, 202 yds, 3 TD
Lamar	Rushing	Khalan Griffin	19 carries, 120 yds, 1 TD
Lamar	Receiving	Sevonne Rhea	2 receptions, 74 yds, 1 TD
Northwestern State	Passing	Quaterius Hawkins	14/25, 139 yds, 2 INT
Northwestern State	Rushing	Kareame Cotton	5 carries, 40 yds
Northwestern State	Receiving	Myles Kit-Denton	5 receptions, 77 yds

=== At Southeastern Louisiana (rivalry) ===
Northwestern State Demons at Southeastern Louisiana Lions – Game summary

Quarter	1	2	3	4	Total
Demons	0	0	0	0	0
Lions	14	3	14	10	41

at Strawberry Stadium, Hammond, Louisiana

- Date: November 9
- Game time: 6:00 p.m. CST
- Game weather: Cloudy • Temperature: 80 °F (27 °C) • Wind: SE at 14 miles per hour (23 km/h)
- Game attendance: 3,321
- Referee: James Brookhart
- TV announcers (ESPN+): Chase Gispert (play-by-play) and Lucas Hill (analyst)
- Box score, Recap

Game information
First quarter
- SLU – Brandon Hayes 4-yard pass from Eli Sawyer (Riley Callaghan kick), 8:09. Lions 7–0. Drive: 12 plays, 90 yards, 6:20.
- SLU – Darius Lewis 40-yard pass from Eli Sawyer (Riley Callaghan kick), 1:04. Lions 14–0. Drive: 3 plays, 80 yards, 1:12.

Second quarter

- SLU – Riley Callaghan 19-yard field goal, 0:29. Lions 17–0. Drive: 4 plays, 3 yards, 0:59.

Third quarter

- SLU – Rodeo Graham Jr. 6-yard run (Riley Callaghan kick), 10:52. Lions 24–0. Drive: 11 plays, 78 yards, 4:00.
- SLU – Rodeo Graham Jr. 1-yard run (Riley Callaghan kick), 4:03. Lions 31–0. Drive: 12 plays, 58 yards, 5:10.

Fourth quarter

- SLU – Antonio Martin Jr. 5-yard run (Riley Callaghan kick), 12:06. Lions 38–0. Drive: 8 plays, 51 yards, 4:46.
- SLU – Riley Callaghan 42-yard field goal, 7:41. Lions 41–0. Drive: 4 plays, 1 yard, 1:58.

Statistics	NWST	SELA
First downs	5	21
Total yards	140	424
Rushing yards	22	218
Passing yards	118	206
Turnovers	1	1
Time of possession	23:28	36:32

Team	Category	Player	Statistics
Northwestern State	Passing	Quaterius Hawkins	12/18, 118 yards
Northwestern State	Rushing	Jeremiah James	5 carries, 10 yards
Northwestern State	Receiving	Kenard King	2 receptions, 42 yards
Southeastern Louisiana	Passing	Eli Sawyer	18/26, 206 yards, 2 TD, INT
Southeastern Louisiana	Rushing	Antonio Martin Jr.	14 carries, 110 yards, TD
Southeastern Louisiana	Receiving	Darius Lewis	4 receptions, 79 yards, TD

=== McNeese (rivalry) ===
McNeese Cowboys at Northwestern State Demons – Game summary

Quarter	1	2	3	4	Total
Cowboys	0	14	14	7	35
Demons	0	3	0	0	3

at Harry Turpin Stadium, Natchitoches, Louisiana

- Date: November 16
- Game time: 1:00 p.m. CST
- Game weather: Sunny • Temperature: 75 °F (24 °C) • Wind: SE at 1 mile per hour (1.6 km/h)
- Game attendance: 7,754
- Referee: Gary Leeper
- TV announcers (ESPN+): Patrick Netherton (play-by-play) and Gary Reasons (analyst)
- Box score, Recap

Game information
First quarter
- No scoring plays

Second quarter

- MCN – Coleby Hamm 2-yard run (Tyler Larco kick), 11:57. Cowboys 7–0. Drive: 7 plays, 42 yards, 2:58.
- NSU – Reed Honshtein 25-yard field goal, 8:31. Cowboys 7–3. Drive: 7 plays, 58 yards, 3:14.
- MCN – Logan Mauldin 2-yard pass from Alex Flores (Tyler Larco kick), 0:29. Cowboys 14–3. Drive: 13 plays, 91 yards, 3:39.

Third quarter

- MCN – Bryce Strong 16-yard run (Tyler Larco kick), 10:53. Cowboys 21–3. Drive: 3 plays, 27 yards, 0:59.
- MCN – Joshon Barbie 25-yard pass from Jamaal Levi (Tyler Larco kick), 5:30. Cowboys 28–3. Drive: 6 plays, 74 yards, 2:07.

Fourth quarter

- MCN – Bryce Strong 1-yard run (Deaglan Camron kick), 1:53. Cowboys 35–3. Drive: 10 plays, 75 yards, 4:59.

Statistics	MCN	NWST
First downs	24	9
Total yards	440	157
Rushing yards	314	61
Passing yards	126	96
Turnovers	4	2
Time of possession	28:35	31:25

Team	Category	Player	Statistics
McNeese	Passing	Alex Flores	8/14, 62 yards, TD, 2 INT
McNeese	Rushing	Joshon Barbie	22 carries, 139 yards
McNeese	Receiving	Jessie Campbell III	3 receptions, 34 yards
Northwestern State	Passing	Abram Johnston	5/14, 87 yards, INT
Northwestern State	Rushing	Ray McKneely-Harris	7 carries, 22 yards
Northwestern State	Receiving	Ray McKneely-Harris	1 reception, 54 yards

=== At Houston Christian ===
Northwestern State Demons at Houston Christian Huskies

Quarter	1	2	3	4	Total
Demons	0	14	3	7	24
Huskies	17	7	35	3	62

at Husky Stadium, Houston, Texas

- Date: November 23
- Game time: 2:00 p.m. CST
- Game weather: Sunny • Temperature: 77 °F (25 °C) • Wind: N at 4 miles per hour (6.4 km/h)
- Game attendance: 1,783
- Referee: Matt Beck
- TV announcers (ESPN+): Randy McIlvoy (play-by-play) and Brennan Young (analyst)
- Box score, Recap

Game information
First quarter
- HCU – Dillon Fedor 23-yard field goal, 11:27. Huskies 3–0. Drive: 6 plays, 37 yards, 1:47.
- HCU – AJ Wilson 32-yard pass from Cutter Stewart (Dillon Fedor kick), 7:24. Huskies 10–0. Drive: 8 plays, 71 yards, 3:00.
- HCU – Calvin Hill 2-yard run (Dillon Fedor kick), 1:53. Huskies 17–0. Drive: 8 plays, 45 yards, 3:30.

Second quarter

- NSU – Myles Kitt-Denton 60-yard pass from JT Fayard (Reed Honshtein kick), 14:52. Huskies 17–7. Drive: 5 plays, 90 yards, 1:55.
- HCU – Darryle Evans 47-yard run (Dillon Fedor kick), 14:15. Huskies 24–7. Drive: 2 plays, 75 yards, 0:37.
- NSU – Zay Davis 9-yard pass from JT Fayard (Reed Honshtein kick), 3:20. Huskies 24–14. Drive: 8 plays, 51 yards, 3:41.

Third quarter

- HCU – Calvin Hill 25-yard run (Dillon Fedor kick), 13:50. Huskies 31–14. Drive: 4 plays, 79 yards, 1:04.
- HCU – Deuce McMillan 11-yard pass from Cutter Stewart (Dillon Fedor kick), 12:40. Huskies 38–14. Drive: 3 plays, 15 yards, 1:02.
- HCU – Champ Dozier 3-yard run (Dillon Fedor kick), 10:09. Huskies 45–14. Drive: 4 plays, 41 yards, 1:33.
- NSU – Reed Honshtein 21-yard field goal, 8:56. Huskies 45–17. Drive: 5 plays, 9 yards, 0:59.
- HCU – Jesse Valenzuela 98-yard kickoff return (Dillon Fedor kick), 8:39. Huskies 52–17. Drive: 3 plays, 2 yards, 0:59.
- HCU – Ismael Fuller 36-yard pass from Cutter Stewart (Dillon Fedor kick), 0:25. Huskies 59–17. Drive: 3 plays, 43 yards, 1:21.

Fourth quarter

- NSU – Jeremiah James 6-yard run (Reed Honshtein kick), 10:25. Huskies 59–24. Drive: 6 plays, 56 yards, 2:01.
- HCU – Dillon Fedor 27-yard field goal, 1:55. Huskies 62–24. Drive: 15 plays, 65 yards, 8:30.

Statistics	NWST	HCU
First downs	10	26
Total yards	211	617
Rushing yards	26	321
Passing yards	185	296
Turnovers	1	1
Time of possession	27:24	32:36

Team	Category	Player	Statistics
Northwestern State	Passing	JT Fayard	11/19, 182 yards, 2 TD, INT
Northwestern State	Rushing	Jeremiah James	6 carries, 39 yards, TD
Northwestern State	Receiving	Myles Kitt-Denton	2 receptions, 63 yards, TD
Houston Christian	Passing	Cutter Stewart	17/25, 296 yards, 3 TD, INT
Houston Christian	Rushing	Calvin Hill	20 carries, 109 yards, 2 TD
Houston Christian	Receiving	AJ Wilson	3 receptions, 123 yards, TD
