= Sammy McCorkle =

American football coach (born 1972)

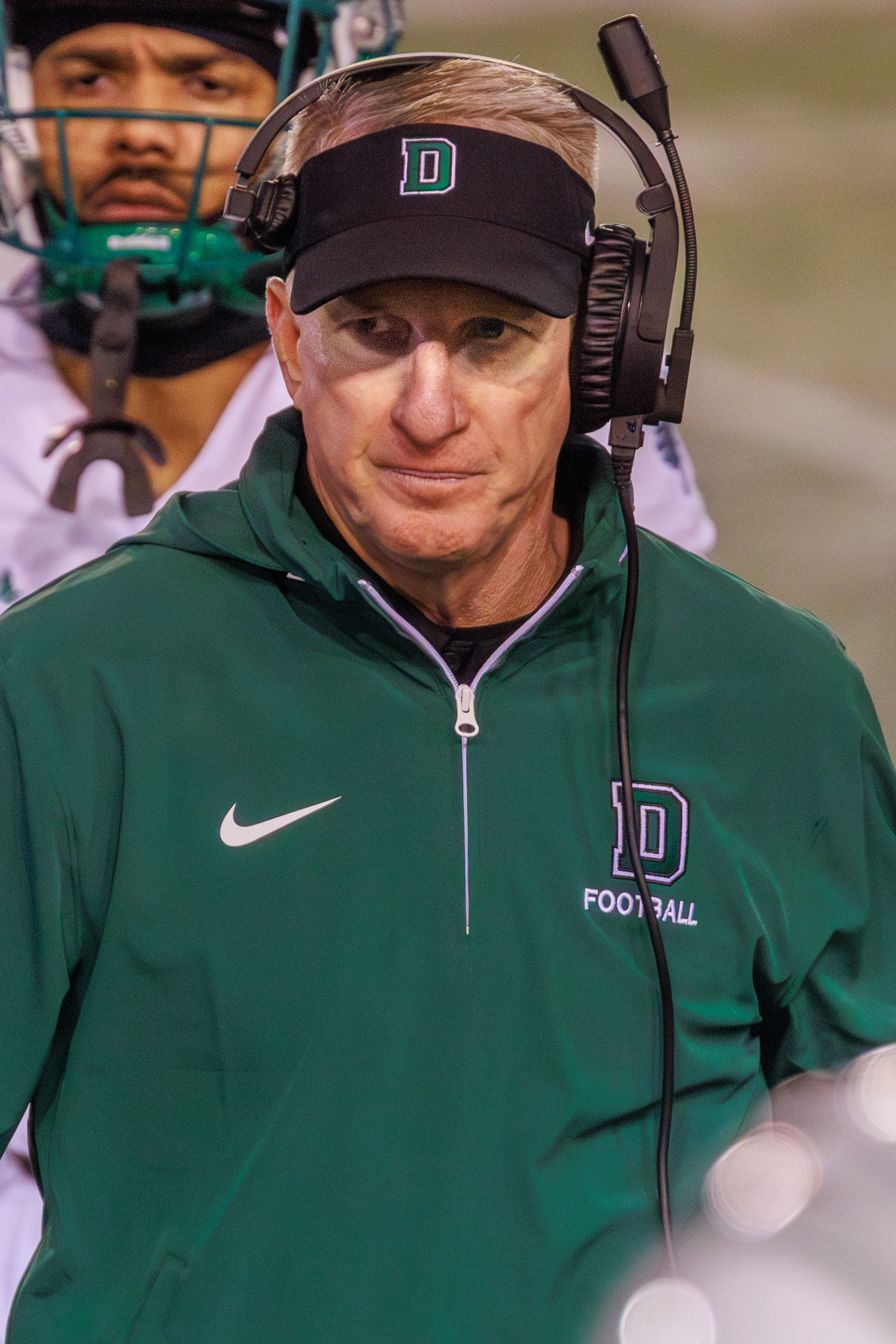
- McCorkle in 2024

Current position
- Title: Head coach
- Team: Dartmouth
- Conference: Ivy League
- Record: 25–12

Biographical details
- Born: November 17, 1972 (age 53); Fort Pierce, Florida, U.S.

Playing career
- 1993–1996: Florida
- Position: Defensive back

Coaching career (HC unless noted)
- 1996: Spanish River HS (FL) (LB/DB)
- 1997–1999: Florida (GA)
- 2000: Tennessee–Martin (DB)
- 2001–2002: Tennessee–Martin (DC)
- 2003–2004: Martin County HS (FL)
- 2005–2022: Dartmouth (ST/DB)
- 2023–present: Dartmouth

Head coaching record
- Overall: 25–12 (college); 5–13 (high school)

Accomplishments and honors

Championships
- 2 Ivy League (2023, 2024)

Awards
- Ivy League Coach of the Year (2023)

Samuel Blaine McCorkle II (born November 17, 1972) is an American college football coach. He is the head football coach for Dartmouth College, a position he has held since 2023 after head football coach Buddy Teevens sustained injuries, and subsequently died, due to a bicycle accident. He was the head football coach for Martin County High School from 2003 to 2004. He also coached for Spanish River Community High School, Florida, and Tennessee–Martin. He played college football for Florida as a defensive back. In his four years playing for head coach Steve Spurrier between 1993 and 1996, Florida won four straight SEC championships, and won the 1996 national title.

After taking over the head coaching position at Dartmouth in 2023, McCorkle led the Big Green to a share of the Ivy League championship and, following the season, was named the 2023 Ivy League Coach of the Year.

== Personal life ==
McCorkle's cousin, Blaine, is the head football coach for Northwestern State University. Sammy's uncle, Sam, was the head football coach for Livingston University—now known as the University of West Alabama.

== Head coaching record ==
=== College ===
Year	Team	Overall	Conference	Standing	Bowl/playoffs
Dartmouth Big Green (Ivy League) (2023–present)
2023	Dartmouth	6–4	5–2	T–1st	
2024	Dartmouth	8–2	5–2	T–1st	
2025	Dartmouth	7–3	4–3	T–3rd	
2026	Dartmouth	4–3	3–1		
Dartmouth:		25–12	17–8		
Total:		25–12			
National championship Conference title Conference division title or championship game berth

=== High school ===
Year	Team	Overall	Conference	Standing	Bowl/playoffs
Martin County Tigers () (2003–2004)
2003	Martin County	4–6	2–3	4th	
2004	Martin County	1–7	1–5	6th	
Martin County:		5–13	3–8		
Total:		5–13			
