= 2024 Houston Christian Huskies football team =

American college football season

2024 Houston Christian Huskies football
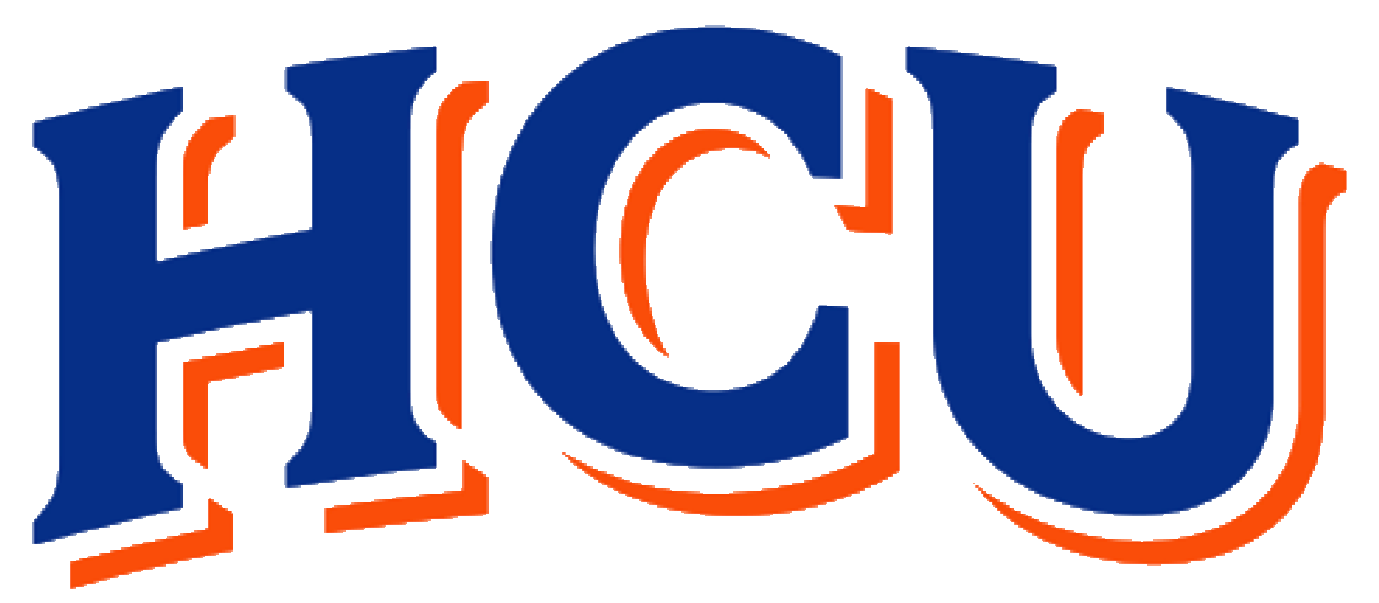
- Conference: Southland Conference
- Record: 5–7 (3–4 Southland)
- Head coach: Jason Bachtel (1st season)
- Offensive scheme: Pro spread
- Defensive coordinator: Zach Wilkerson (1st season)
- Base defense: 3–4
- Home stadium: Husky Stadium

2024 Southland Conference football standings
	Conf.			Overall
Team	W		L	W		L
No. 6 Incarnate Word $^	7	–	0	11	–	3
Southeastern Louisiana	6	–	1	7	–	5
Stephen F. Austin	4	–	3	7	–	5
Lamar	4	–	3	7	–	5
McNeese	3	–	4	6	–	6
Houston Christian	3	–	4	5	–	7
East Texas A&M*	2	–	4	3	–	9
Nicholls	2	–	5	4	–	8
Northwestern State	0	–	7	0	–	12
$ – Conference champion; ^ – FCS playoff participant; * – East Texas A&M was ineligible for FCS postseason play due to transition from NCAA Division II.; Rankings from STATS Poll

The 2024 Houston Christian Huskies football team represented Houston Christian University in the 2024 NCAA Division I FCS football season. The Huskies played their home games at Husky Stadium in Houston, Texas, and compete in the Southland Conference. They were led by first–year head coach Jason Bachtel.

== Preseason ==
=== Preseason poll ===
The Southland Conference released their preseason poll on July 22, 2024. The Huskies were picked to finish seventh in the conference.

=== Preseason All–Southland Teams ===
The Southland Conference announced the 2024 preseason all-conference football team selections on July 22, 2024. HCU had a total of three players selected.

Offense

1st Team

- Dillon Fedor – Placekicker, SR

2nd Team

- Dion Daniels – Offensive lineman, SR

Defense

2nd Team

- Zae Smith – Defensive lineman, JR

== Schedule ==
Date	Time	Opponent	Site	TV	Result	Attendance
August 31	7:00 pm	at SMU*	Gerald J. Ford Stadium; University Park, TX	ACCNX/ESPN+	L 7–59	27,080
September 7	6:00 pm	No. 20 Tarleton State*	Husky Stadium; Houston, TX	ESPN+	L 18–35	2,080
September 14	6:00 pm	Louisiana Christian*	Husky Stadium; Houston, TX	ESPN+	W 70–7	1,256
September 21	2:30 pm	at UTSA*	Alamodome; San Antonio, TX	ESPN+	L 7–45	20,973
September 28	12:00 p.m.	at Indiana State*	Memorial Stadium; Terre Haute, IN	ESPN+	W 27–24	3,466
October 5	6:00 pm	No. 22 McNeese	Husky Stadium; Houston, TX	ESPN+	W 43–22	2,232
October 12	2:00 pm	Southeastern Louisiana	Husky Stadium; Houston, TX	ESPN+	L 7–37	1,825
October 26	6:00 p.m.	at Stephen F. Austin	Homer Bryce Stadium; Nacogdoches, TX	ESPN+	L 6-55	6,246
November 2	2:00 pm	at No. 9 Incarnate Word	Gayle and Tom Benson Stadium; San Antonio, TX	ESPN+	L 20–45	2,189
November 9	2:00 pm	Nicholls^{†}	Husky Stadium; Houston, TX	ESPN+	W 24–21	2,081
November 16	1:00 pm	at East Texas A&M	Ernest Hawkins Field at Memorial Stadium; Commerce, TX	ESPN+	L 40–41	2,354
November 23	2:00 pm	Northwestern State	Husky Stadium; Houston, TX	ESPN+	W 62–24	1,783
*Non-conference game; ^{†}Homecoming; Rankings from STATS Poll released prior to the game; All times are in Central time

== Game summaries ==
=== at SMU (FBS) ===
Game One – Houston Christian Huskies (0-0) at SMU Mustangs (FBS) (1-0) – Game summary

Quarter	1	2	3	4	Total
Huskies	0	7	0	0	7
Mustangs (FBS)	28	14	7	10	59

at Gerald J. Ford Stadium, University Park, Texas

- Date: Saturday August 31, 2024
- Game time: 7:00 p.m. CDT
- Game weather: Sunny, 91 °F (33 °C)
- Game attendance: 27,080
- Referee: Nate Blake
- TV announcers (ACCNX/ESPN+): Doug Sherman, Tyoka Jackson, and Marilyn Payne

Game information

First quarter

- SMU – Jordan Hudson 28-yard pass from Preston Stone (pass failed), 10:47. Mustangs 6–0. Drive: 4 plays, 84 yards, 1:20.
- SMU – Brashard Smith 1-yard run (Collin Rogers kick), 7:07. Mustangs 13–0. Drive: 7 plays, 59 yards, 3:05.
- SMU – Brashard Smith 2-yard run (Collin Rogers kick), 3:04. Mustangs 20–0. Drive: 6 plays, 55 yards, 1:58.
- SMU – Anthony Booker Jr. 16-yard fumble return (L. J. Johnson Jr. run), 2:03. Mustangs 28–0.

Second quarter

- SMU – Jake Bailey 4-yard pass from Preston Stone (Collin Rogers kick), 13:42. Mustangs 35–0. Drive: 5 plays, 80 yards, 1:50.
- HCU – Deuce McMillan 10-yard pass from Cutter Stewart (Dillon Fedor kick), 12:19. Mustangs 35–7. Drive: 4 plays, 50 yards, 1:23.
- SMU – Key'Shawn Smith 35-yard pass from Kevin Jennings (Collin Rogers kick), 5:05. Mustangs 42–7. Drive: 4 plays, 42 yards, 1:28.

Third quarter

- SMU – Derrick McFall 17-yard run (Gabriel Lorenzo kick), 7:35. Mustangs 49–7. Drive: 9 plays, 85 yards, 3:58.

Fourth quarter

- SMU – Kevin Jennings 6-yard run (Gabriel Lorenzo kick), 14:48. Mustangs 56–7. Drive: 11 plays, 64 yards, 4:24.
- SMU – Collin Rogers 23-yard field goal, 1:54. Mustangs 59–7. Drive: 16 plays, 69 yards, 10:50.

Statistics	HCU	SMU
First downs	10	28
Total yards	157	595
Rushing yards	34	369
Passing yards	123	226
Turnovers	3	1
Time of possession	24:56	35:04

Team	Category	Player	Statistics
Houston Christian	Passing	Cutter Stewart	10/25, 118 yards, TD, 2 INT
Houston Christian	Rushing	Champ Dozier	7 rushes, 22 yards
Houston Christian	Receiving	Ismael Fuller	2 receptions, 38 yards
SMU	Passing	Kevin Jennings	10/14, 148 yards, TD
SMU	Rushing	Brashard Smith	9 rushes, 108 yards, 2 TD
SMU	Receiving	Jake Bailey	4 receptions, 59 yards, TD

=== vs. No. 20 Tarleton State ===
Game Two – No. 20 Tarleton State Texans (1–1) vs Houston Christian Huskies (0–1) – Game summary

Quarter	1	2	3	4	Total
No. 20 Texans	0	0	0	0	0
Huskies	0	0	0	0	0

at Husky Stadium • Houston, TX

- Date: Saturday September 7, 2024
- Game time: 6:00 PM CST
- Game weather: 0 °F (−18 °C)
- TV announcers (ESPN+): Jordan Smith, Brandon Kruse

Game information

First quarter
Second quarter
Third quarter
Fourth quarter

Statistics	TAR	HCU
First downs		
Total yards		
Rushing yards		
Passing yards		
Passing: Comp–Att–Int		
Time of possession		

Team	Category	Player	Statistics
Tarleton State	Passing		
Tarleton State	Rushing		
Tarleton State	Receiving		
Houston Christian	Passing		
Houston Christian	Rushing		
Houston Christian	Receiving		

=== Louisiana Christian (NAIA) ===
Game Three – Louisiana Christian Wildcats (NAIA) (0–1) at Houston Christian Huskies (0–2)

Quarter	1	2	3	4	Total
Wildcats {NAIA)	0	0	7	0	7
Huskies	15	14	28	13	70

at Husky Stadium, Houston, Texas

- Date: September 14
- Game time: 6:00 pm
- Game weather: Wind: NE 4 mph • Weather: Sunny • Temp: 94 °F (34 °C)
- Game attendance: 1,256
- Referee: Matt Beck
- TV announcers (ESPN+): Jordan Smith, Brandon Kruse

Game information

First Quarter

- (14:46) HCU – Semaj Brown 83-yard kickoff return, Dillon Fedor kick (Houston Christian 7–0)
- (8:26) HCU – Deuce McMillan 35-yard pass from Eli Brickhandler, Drake Martinez pass (Drive: 4 plays, 75 yards, 1:14; Houston Christian 15–0)

Second Quarter

- (8:47) HCU – AJ Wilson 34-yard pass from Eli Brickhandler, Dillon Fedor kick (Drive: 5 plays, 49 yards, 2:10; Houston Christian 22–0)
- (7:00) HCU – Calvin Hill 25-yard run, Dillon Fedor kick (Drive: 2 plays, 34 yards, 0:47; Houston Christian 29–0)

Third Quarter

- (12:39) HCU – Drake Martinez 24-yard pass from Cutter Stewart, Dillon Fedor kick (Drive: 4 plays, 32 yards, 1:18; Houston Christian 36–0)
- (7:17) LCU – Datlan Cunningham 1-yard run, Levi Hilborn kick (Drive: 15 plays, 75 yards, 5:22; Houston Christian 36–7)
- (5:57) HCU – Ismael Fuller 71-yard pass from Cutter Stewart, Dillon Fedor kick (Drive: 3 plays, 78 yards, 1:13; Houston Christian 43–7)
- (3:47) HCU – Cutter Stewart 1-yard run, Dillon Fedor kick (Drive: 4 plays, 21 yards, 1:56; Houston Christian 50–7)
- (0:22) HCU – Semaj Brown 65-yard interception, Dillon Fedor kick (Houston Christian 57–7)

Fourth Quarter

- (10:53) HCU – Darryle Evans 2-yard run, Dillon Fedor kick (Drive: 6 plays, 52 yards, 2:42; Houston Christian 64–7)
- (2:38) HCU – Darryle Evans 66-yard run (Drive: 2 plays, 67 yards, 0:55; Houston Christian 70–7)

Statistics	LCU	HCU
First downs	20	21
Total yards	98–323	64–496
Rushing yards	66–168	47–217
Passing yards	155	279
Passing: Comp–Att–Int	15–32–4	11–17–0
Time of possession	35:11	24:49

Team	Category	Player	Statistics
Louisiana Christian	Passing	River Thompson	12/23, 129 yards, 2 INT
Louisiana Christian	Rushing	Daylon Charles	14 carries, 51 yards
Louisiana Christian	Receiving	Sammy Feaster	4 receptions, 53 yards
Houston Christian	Passing	Eli Brickhandler	6/6, 126 yards, 2 TD
Houston Christian	Rushing	Darryle Evans	12 carries, 122 yards, 2 TD
Houston Christian	Receiving	AJ Wilson	3 receptions, 77 yards, TD

=== at UTSA (FBS) ===
Game Four – Houston Christian Huskies (1–2) at UTSA Roadrunners (FBS) (1–2)

Quarter	1	2	3	4	Total
Huskies	0	7	0	0	7
Roadrunners (FBS)	10	21	7	7	45

at Alamodome, San Antonio, Texas

- Date: September 21
- Game time: 2:30 pm
- Game weather: None (played indoors)
- Game attendance: 20,973
- Referee: Darryl DeBerry
- TV announcers (ESPN+): Ted Emrich (play-by-play) and Charlie Strong (analyst)

Game information

First Quarter

- (9:37) UTSA – Chase Allen 26-yard field goal (Drive: 8 plays, 61 yards, 2:42; UTSA 3–0)
- (2:21) UTSA – Devin McCuin 5-yard pass from Owen McCown, Chase Allen kick (Drive: 10 plays, 54 yards, 4:09; UTSA 10–0)

Second Quarter

- (6:14) UTSA – Brandon High 9-yard run, Chase Allen kick (Drive: 7 plays, 50 yards, 2:33; UTSA 17–0)
- (3:58) HCU – Jesse Valenzuela 20-yard run, Reed Chandley kick (Drive: 5 plays, 62 yards, 2:08; UTSA 17–7)
- (2:13) UTSA – Willie McCoy 59-yard pass from Owen McCown, Chase Allen kick (Drive: 5 plays, 75 yards, 1:45; UTSA 24–7)
- (0:47) UTSA – Robert Henry 17-yard pass from Owen McCown, Tate Sandell kick (Drive: 5 plays, 55 yards, 0:51; UTSA 31–7)

Third Quarter

- (11:08) UTSA – Kevorian Barnes 8-yard run, Chase Allen kick (Drive: 9 plays, 68 yards, 3:44; UTSA 38–7)

Fourth Quarter

- (13:57) UTSA – Jamel Hardy 5-yard pass from Eddie Lee Marburger, Tate Sandell kick (Drive: 14 plays, 76 yards, 5:49; UTSA 45–7)

Statistics	HCU	UTSA
First downs	12	34
Total yards	57–177	83–536
Rushing yards	32–50	51–269
Passing yards	127	267
Passing: Comp–Att–Int	13–25–0	23–32–1
Time of possession	24:29	35:31

Team	Category	Player	Statistics
Houston Christian	Passing	Eli Brickhandler	7/12, 83 yards
Houston Christian	Rushing	Jesse Valenzuela	5 carries, 22 yards, TD
Houston Christian	Receiving	AJ Wilson	4 receptions, 71 yards
UTSA	Passing	Owen McCown	18/25, 226 yards, 3 TD
UTSA	Rushing	Bryson Donnell	12 carries, 74 yards
UTSA	Receiving	Willie McCoy	2 receptions, 85 yards, TD

=== at Indiana State ===
Game Five – Houston Christian Huskies (1–3) at Indiana State Sycamores (1–2)

Quarter	1	2	Total
Huskies			0
Sycamores			0

at Memorial Stadium, Terre Haute, Indiana

- Date: September 28
- Game time: TBA
- Game weather: Wind: • Weather: • Temp:

Game information

First Quarter

Second Quarter

Third Quarter

Fourth Quarter

Statistics	HCU	INST
First downs		
Total yards		
Rushing yards		
Passing yards		
Passing: Comp–Att–Int		
Time of possession		

Team	Category	Player	Statistics
Houston Christian	Passing		
Houston Christian	Rushing		
Houston Christian	Receiving		
Indiana State	Passing		
Indiana State	Rushing		
Indiana State	Receiving		

=== vs. No. 22 McNeese ===
Game Six – No. 22 McNeese Cowboys (4–2) vs Houston Christian Huskies (2–3) – Game summary

Quarter	1	2	3	4	Total
No. 22 Cowboys	0	0	0	0	0
Huskies	0	0	0	0	0

at Husky Stadium, Houston, Texas

- Date: Saturday October 5, 2024
- Game time: 6:00 PM
- TV announcers (ESPN+): Garrett Jones, Jackson Cochran

Game information

First quarter
Second quarter
Third quarter
Fourth quarter

Statistics	MCN	HCU
First downs		
Total yards		
Rushing yards		
Passing yards		
Passing: Comp–Att–Int		
Time of possession		

Team	Category	Player	Statistics
McNeese	Passing		
McNeese	Rushing		
McNeese	Receiving		
Houston Christian	Passing		
Houston Christian	Rushing		
Houston Christian	Receiving		

=== Southeastern Louisiana ===
Game Seven – Southeastern Louisiana Lions (2–4) at Houston Christian Huskies (3–3)

Quarter	1	2	3	4	Total
Lions	7	13	10	7	37
Huskies	7	0	0	0	7

at Husky Stadium, Houston, Texas

- Date: Saturday, October 12, 2024
- Game time: 2:03 pm
- Game weather: Wind: N 5mph • Weather: Sunny • Temp: 90
- Game attendance: 1,825
- TV announcers (ESPN+): Garrett Jones, Jackson Cochran
- Box Score

Game information

First Quarter

Second Quarter

Third Quarter

Fourth Quarter

Statistics	SELA	HCU
First downs	21	13
Total yards	69–446	65–326
Rushing yards	41–278	45–238
Passing yards	168	88
Passing: Comp–Att–Int	19–28–0	6–20–1
Time of possession	35:17	24:43

Team	Category	Player	Statistics
Southeastern Louisiana	Passing	Eli Sawyer	18/26, 144 yards, 2 TD
Southeastern Louisiana	Rushing	Rodeo Graham, Jr.	8 carries, 109 yards
Southeastern Louisiana	Receiving	Darius Lewis	4 receptions, 46 yards
Houston Christian	Passing	CJ Rogers	4/12, 75 yards
Houston Christian	Rushing	Darryle Evans	20 carries, 128 yards
Houston Christian	Receiving	Deuce McMillan	2 receptions, 47 yards

=== at Stephen F. Austin ===
Game Eight – Houston Christian Huskies (3–4; 1–1) at Stephen F. Austin Lumberjacks (4–3; 2–2) – Game summary

Quarter	1	2	3	4	Total
Huskies	0	6	0	0	6
Lumberjacks	3	21	21	10	55

at Homer Bryce Stadium, Nacogdoches, Texas

- Date: October 26
- Game time: 6:02 p.m.
- Game weather: Sunny • Temperature: 83 °F (28 °C)
- Game attendance: 6,246
- TV announcers (ESPN+): Chris Simmons, Courtnee Garcia
- Box Score

Game information

First Quarter

Second Quarter

Third Quarter

Fourth Quarter

Statistics	HCU	SFA
First downs	15	29
Total yards	68–208	67–561
Rushing yards	38–82	38–231
Passing yards	126	330
Passing: Comp–Att–Int	13–30–1	21–29–1
Time of possession	26:55	29:35

Team	Category	Player	Statistics
Houston Christian	Passing	Eli Brickhandler	4/12, 69 yards, INT
Houston Christian	Rushing	Eli Brickhandler	9 carries, 31 yards
Houston Christian	Receiving	Deuce McMillan	2 receptions, 47 yards
Stephen F. Austin	Passing	Sam Vidlak	20/27, 316 yards, 5 TD, INT
Stephen F. Austin	Rushing	Jaylen Jenkins	21 carries, 110 yards
Stephen F. Austin	Receiving	Jordan Nabors	3 receptions, 108 yards, TD

=== at No. 9 Incarnate Word ===
Game Nine – Houston Christian Huskies (3–5; 1–2) at No. 9 Incarnate Word Cardinals (6–2; 3–0)

Quarter	1	2	3	4	Total
Huskies	3	3	0	14	20
No. 9 Cardinals	10	21	14	0	45

at Gayle and Tom Benson Stadium, San Antonio, Texas

- Date: November 2
- Game time: 2:00 pm
- Game weather: Wind: SE 11 mph • Weather: Cloudy • Temp: 81
- Game attendance: 2,189
- Referee: Ed Bourgeios
- TV announcers (ESPN+): Karl Schoening (play-by-play), Sam Kaman (analyst) & Blair Villarreal (sideline)

Game information

First Quarter

- HCU – 12:16 Dillon Fedor 37 yard field goal
  HCU 3–0 Drive: 7 plays, 33 yards, 2:36
- UIW – 8:08 Brack Peacock 25 yard field goal
  Tied 3–3 Drive: 12 plays, 53 yards, 4:00
- UIW – 6:04 Dekalon Taylor 28 yard run, Brack Peacock kick
  UIW 10–3 Drive: 2 plays, 41 yards, 0:35

Second Quarter

- UIW – 8:42 Roy Alexander 26 yard pass from Zach Calzada, Brack Peacock kick
  UIW 17–3 Drive: 2 plays, 53 yards, 0:29
- HCU – 4:46 Dillon Fedor 34 yard field goal
  UIW 17–6 Drive: 9 plays, 58 yards, 3:56
- UIW – 1:50 Zach Calzada 2 yard run, Brack Peacock kick
  UIW 24–6 Drive: 9 plays, 82 yards, 2:52
- UIW – 0:12 Roy Alexander 9 yard pass from Zach Calzada, Brack Peacock kick
  UIW 31–6 Drive: 6 plays, 71 yards, 1:01

Third Quarter

- UIW – 12:27 Jalen Walthall 50 yard pass from Zach Calzada, Brack Peacock kick
  UIW 38–6 Drive: 7 plays, 75 yards, 2:33
- UIW – 1:45 Roy Alexander 3 yard pass from Zach Calzada, Brack Peacock kick
  UIW 45–6 Drive: 10 plays, 78 yards, 4:05

Fourth Quarter

- HCU – 4:52 Jesse Valenzuela 16 yard run, Dillon Fedor kick
  UIW 45–13 Drive: 9 plays, 92 yards, 3:46
- HCU – 1:53 AJ Wilson 32 yard pass from Cutter Stewart, Dillon Fedor kick
  UIW 45–20 Drive: 5 plays, 85 yards, 1:31

Statistics	HCU	UIW
First downs	14	31
Total yards	64–301	89–573
Rushing yards	30–84	39–241
Passing yards	217	332
Passing: Comp–Att–Int	18–34–2	32–50–0
Time of possession	24:05	35:55

Team	Category	Player	Statistics
Houston Christian	Passing	Cutter Stewart	10/12, 145 yards, 1 TD
Houston Christian	Rushing	Calvin Hill	4 carries, 53 yards
Houston Christian	Receiving	AJ Wilson	3 receptions, 111 yards, 1 TD
Incarnate Word	Passing	Zach Calzada	29/44, 306 yards, 4 TD
Incarnate Word	Rushing	Dekalon Taylor	14 carries, 128 yards, 1 TD
Incarnate Word	Receiving	Roy Alexander	7 receptions, 89 yards, 3 TDs

=== Nicholls ===
Game Ten – Nicholls Colonels (4–5; 2–2) at Houston Christian Huskies (3–6; 1–3)

Quarter	1	2	Total
Colonels			0
Huskies			0

at Husky Stadium, Houston, Texas

- Date: November 9
- Game time: 2:00 pm
- Game weather: Wind: • Weather: • Temp:
- TV announcers (ESPN+): Randy McIlvoy, Jackson Cochran

Game information

First Quarter

Second Quarter

Third Quarter

Fourth Quarter

Statistics	NICH	HCU
First downs		
Total yards		
Rushing yards		
Passing yards		
Passing: Comp–Att–Int		
Time of possession		

Team	Category	Player	Statistics
Nicholls	Passing		
Nicholls	Rushing		
Nicholls	Receiving		
Houston Christian	Passing		
Houston Christian	Rushing		
Houston Christian	Receiving		

=== at East Texas A&M ===
Game Eleven – Houston Christian Huskies (4–6; 2–3) at East Texas A&M Lions (2–8; 1–3)

Quarter	1	2	Total
Huskies			0
Lions			0

at Ernest Hawkins Field at Memorial Stadium, Commerce, Texas

- Date: November 16
- Game time: 1:00 pm
- Game weather: Wind: • Weather: • Temp:
- TV announcers (ESPN+): Greg Higgins, Adam Routon

Game information

First Quarter

Second Quarter

Third Quarter

Fourth Quarter

Statistics	HCU	ETAM
First downs		
Total yards		
Rushing yards		
Passing yards		
Passing: Comp–Att–Int		
Time of possession		

Team	Category	Player	Statistics
Houston Christian	Passing		
Houston Christian	Rushing		
Houston Christian	Receiving		
East Texas A&M	Passing		
East Texas A&M	Rushing		
East Texas A&M	Receiving		

=== Northwestern State ===
Game Twelve – Northwestern State Demons (0–11; 0–6) at Houston Christian Huskies (4–7; 2–4)

Quarter	1	2	3	4	Total
Demons	0	14	3	7	24
Huskies	17	7	35	3	62

at Husky Stadium, Houston, Texas

- Date: November 23
- Game time: 2:00 pm
- Game weather: Sunny • Temperature: 77 °F (25 °C) • Wind: N at 4 miles per hour (6.4 km/h)
- Game attendance: 1,783
- Referee: Matt Beck
- TV announcers (ESPN+): Randy McIlvoy (play-by-play) and Brennan Young (analyst)

Game information

First Quarter

- HCU – Dillon Fedor 23-yard field goal, 11:27. Huskies 3–0. Drive: 6 plays, 37 yards, 1:47.
- HCU – AJ Wilson 32-yard pass from Cutter Stewart (Dillon Fedor kick), 7:24. Huskies 10–0. Drive: 8 plays, 71 yards, 3:00.
- HCU – Calvin Hill 2-yard run (Dillon Fedor kick), 1:53. Huskies 17–0. Drive: 8 plays, 45 yards, 3:30.

Second Quarter

- NSU – Myles Kitt-Denton 60-yard pass from JT Fayard (Reed Honshtein kick), 14:52. Huskies 17–7. Drive: 5 plays, 90 yards, 1:55.
- HCU – Darryle Evans 47-yard run (Dillon Fedor kick), 14:15. Huskies 24–7. Drive: 2 plays, 75 yards, 0:37.
- NSU – Zay Davis 9-yard pass from JT Fayard (Reed Honshtein kick), 3:20. Huskies 24–14. Drive: 8 plays, 51 yards, 3:41.

Third Quarter

- HCU – Calvin Hill 25-yard run (Dillon Fedor kick), 13:50. Huskies 31–14. Drive: 4 plays, 79 yards, 1:04.
- HCU – Deuce McMillan 11-yard pass from Cutter Stewart (Dillon Fedor kick), 12:40. Huskies 38–14. Drive: 3 plays, 15 yards, 1:02.
- HCU – Champ Dozier 3-yard run (Dillon Fedor kick), 10:09. Huskies 45–14. Drive: 4 plays, 41 yards, 1:33.
- NSU – Reed Honshtein 21-yard field goal, 8:56. Huskies 45–17. Drive: 5 plays, 9 yards, 0:59.
- HCU – Jesse Valenzuela 98-yard kickoff return (Dillon Fedor kick), 8:39. Huskies 52–17. Drive: 3 plays, 2 yards, 0:59.
- HCU – Ismael Fuller 36-yard pass from Cutter Stewart (Dillon Fedor kick), 0:25. Huskies 59–17. Drive: 3 plays, 43 yards, 1:21.

Fourth Quarter

- NSU – Jeremiah James 6-yard run (Reed Honshtein kick), 10:25. Huskies 59–24. Drive: 6 plays, 56 yards, 2:01.
- HCU – Dillon Fedor 27-yard field goal, 1:55. Huskies 62–24. Drive: 15 plays, 65 yards, 8:30.

Statistics	NWST	HCU
First downs	10	26
Total yards	211	617
Rushing yards	26	321
Passing yards	185	296
Passing: Comp–Att–Int	12–32–1	17–25–1
Time of possession	24:56	32:36

Team	Category	Player	Statistics
Northwestern State	Passing	JT Fayard	11/19, 182 yards, 2 TD, INT
Northwestern State	Rushing	Jeremiah James	6 carries, 39 yards, TD
Northwestern State	Receiving	Myles Kitt-Denton	2 receptions, 63 yards, TD
Houston Christian	Passing	Cutter Stewart	17/25, 296 yards, 3 TD, INT
Houston Christian	Rushing	Calvin Hill	20 carries, 109 yards, 2 TD
Houston Christian	Receiving	AJ Wilson	3 receptions, 123 yards, TD
