= Scotti Madison =

American baseball player (born 1959)

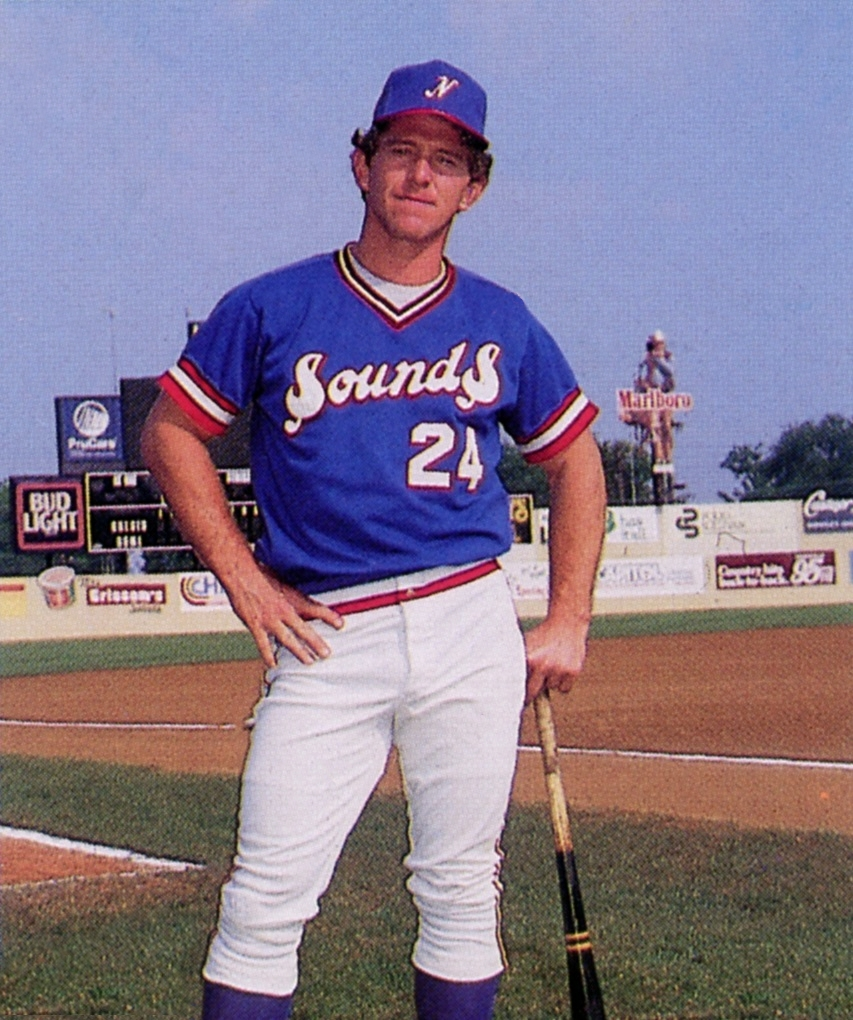
- Madison with the Nashville Sounds in 1986
- Third baseman
- Born: September 12, 1959 (age 66); Pensacola, Florida, U.S.
- Batted: Switch Threw: Right

MLB debut
- July 6, 1985, for the Detroit Tigers

Last MLB appearance
- October 1, 1989, for the Cincinnati Reds

MLB statistics
- Batting average: .163
- Home runs: 1
- Runs batted in: 11
- Stats at Baseball Reference

Teams
- Detroit Tigers (1985–1986); Kansas City Royals (1987–1988); Cincinnati Reds (1989)

Charles Scott Madison (born September 12, 1959) is an American former professional baseball third baseman. He played in 71 games over five seasons in Major League Baseball for the Detroit Tigers, Kansas City Royals, and Cincinnati Reds.

Scotti Madison was born and raised in Pensacola, Florida. He attended J. M. Tate High School and played football there under the guidance of his uncle and coach Carl Madison. A graduate of Vanderbilt University in 1981, Madison was quarterback of the school's football team and catcher for the baseball team. In 1979, he played collegiate summer baseball with the Hyannis Mets of the Cape Cod Baseball League and was named a league all-star. He was selected All-Southeastern Conference three times and All-American his senior year, the first baseball player at VU to be named as a first-team All-American. Vanderbilt University inducted Madison into the Vanderbilt Hall of Fame on September 2, 2011.

In 2012, Madison published his first book, Just a Phone Call Away: A Major Journey through the Minor Leagues, which highlights his baseball-playing years and experiences, from Little League to the USA All-Star team (playing in Cuba in 1979) to the pros.
