= J. M. Tate High School =

Public high school in Florida, U.S.

Coordinates: 30.577426°N 87.300917°W

J.M. Tate High School
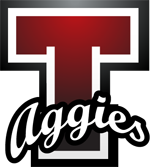

Location
- 1771 Tate Road; Cantonment, Florida 32533-6472; United States

Information
- Type: Public High School
- Established: 1878
- Founder: James Madison Tate Sr.
- School district: Escambia County School District
- Principal: Emily King
- Teaching staff: 81.00 (FTE)
- Grades: 9-12
- Enrollment: 2,156 (2023-2024)
- Student to teacher ratio: 26.62
- Colors: Crimson and Gray
- Athletics: Wrestling, Football, Soccer, Tennis, Swim/Dive, Volleyball, Track, Baseball, Softball, Basketball, Cross Country
- Mascot: Aggie (Horse)
- Accreditation: Southern Association of Colleges and Schools/Florida Department of Education
- Yearbook: The Tahisco
- Website: https://tatehs.escambiaschools.org/

J.M. Tate High School is a public high school in Cantonment, Florida, United States. The school is part of the Escambia County School District.

== History ==
Tate High School was founded in 1878 by James Madison Tate Sr., a Civil War veteran, minister and former lawyer. The school was originally called Roberts High School and was one of the first high schools established in Escambia County. The original school building was one room with a sawdust floor; students sat on wooden benches. Initially, Tate taught all of the grades himself. Tate taught at Roberts High until 1913, when he retired.

In 1917, the James Madison Tate Sr. Agricultural School was completed. The school was a two-story brick building with eight classrooms. Establishment of the agricultural school advanced the agricultural programs already in place at the original Roberts High.

In 1927, O.A. Strange became principal of Tate High School. During his 24-year tenure as head of the school, 10 buildings were added to the campus and the school transformed from a small rural school to a modern high school. In 2026, the county approved the 16-month construction of an auditorium at Tate, which is expected to be completed in September 2027.

== Student organizations and athletics ==
During the early days of Tate High, there was no football equipment, so the school's main sports were basketball and baseball. Tate's baseball team has won seven state championships since 1960. One of the school's most accomplished baseball players, Don Sutton, went on to major league fame with the Los Angeles Dodgers.

The football team won the 4A state championship in 1980 under coach Carl Madison.

The Tate softball team won the Florida Class 7A state championship in 2015 led by pitcher Tori Perkins.

In 2024, the varsity cheer squad won the FHSAA state championships.

Tate's marching band, the Showband of the South, won the first official Bands of America Grand National Championship, in 1980. The J.M. Tate Showband of the South has achieved straight superior ratings in their Marching Performance Assessments for 52 years, as of 2024.

Tate is also known for its drumline which has competed in annual world championship competitions in Dayton, Ohio. The school's colorguard is known as the "Tate Chaparrals." In 1989, the colorguard competed in the WGI Scholastic World Class Competition, winning first place.

The Tate High School FFA chapter was founded in 1929. Agricultural education continues to remain a focal point of the school, and is widely considered to be one of the highest performing FFA chapters in the Florida Panhandle.

== Notable alumni ==
- Jay Bell – Class of 1984, Major League Baseball player, 2-time All-Star, 2001 World Series champion
- Steve Campbell - College and high school football coach
- Brannon Condren - Football safety for Indianapolis Colts, New York Jets
- Qudarius Ford – Professional football defensive back (Saskatchewan Roughriders, Toronto Argonauts, Hamilton Tiger-Cats)
- Travis Fryman – Class of 1987, Major League Baseball player (Cleveland Indians, Detroit Tigers), 5-time All-Star
- Graham Gano – Class of 2005, Kicker for NFL's New York Giants
- Martin Holley – Roman Catholic Bishop
- Scotti Madison – Professional baseball player (Detroit Tigers, Kansas City Royals, Cincinnati Reds)
- Sam McCorkle – College and high school football coach
- Stover McIlwain – Professional baseball player (Chicago White Sox)
- John Monds – Politician, highest total votes ever attained by a Libertarian political candidate
- Dave Murzin – Florida House of Representatives
- Clay Ingram – Florida House of Representatives
- Fred Robbins – Class of 1995. NFL player, Super Bowl champion in 2007 (New York Giants)
- Brad Salmon – Professional baseball player (Cincinnati Reds)
- Don Sutton – Class of 1963. Major League Baseball pitcher (Los Angeles Dodgers, Atlanta Braves) and Hall of Famer.
- Reginald Warren – Class of 2000. Professional basketball player (Veltex Shizuoka)
- Craig Waters – Class of 1974. Communications Director for Florida Supreme Court
