= Norman Joseph =

American football player and coach (born 1954)

Current position
- Title: Assistant head coach & quarterbacks coach
- Team: Northwestern State
- Conference: Southland

Biographical details
- Born: December 28, 1954 (age 71); Vicksburg, Mississippi, U.S.

Playing career
- 1973–1976: Mississippi State
- Position: Quarterback

Coaching career (HC unless noted)
- 1977: Vanderbilt (volunteer)
- 1978–1986: Northeast Louisiana (assistant)
- 1987: Louisiana Tech (PGC/RC)
- 1988–1989: Northwestern State (PGC/RC)
- 1990–1993: Northeast Louisiana (OC)
- 1994–1996: Southern Miss (OC)
- 1998–2000: Belhaven
- 2001–2002: San Jose State (OC)
- 2003: Midwestern State (OC)
- 2004: Louisiana College
- 2005–2013: Mississippi College
- 2015: Millsaps (QB)
- 2016–2017: Columbia Academy (MS) (OC)
- 2018–2019: Southeastern (OC)
- 2020: Catholic HS (LA) (OC/QB)
- 2021–2022: McGill–Toolen HS (AL)
- 2023: Stetson (OC/QB)
- 2024: Northwestern State (OC/QB)
- 2025–present: Northwestern State (AHC/QB)

Head coaching record
- Overall: 63–70 (college); 12–10 (high school)
- Tournaments: 1–1 (NCAA D-III playoffs)

Accomplishments and honors

Championships
- 1 ASC (2009)

Awards
- ASC Coach of the Year (2009)

Norman Bradley Joseph (born December 28, 1954) is an American football college coach and former player. He is the assistant head football coach and quarterbacks coach for Northwestern State University, a position he has held since 2025. He was the head football coach at Mississippi College in Clinton, Mississippi from 2005 to 2013. Joseph served as the head football coach at Belhaven College from 1998 to 2000 and at Louisiana College in 2004.

== Playing career ==
Born in Vicksburg, Mississippi, Joseph played college football at Mississippi State University and earned Churchman All-American honors in 1976. Joseph earned his B.S. in speech education from Mississippi State in 1977 and a Masters of Education Degree while coaching at Northeast Louisiana University in 1979.

== Coaching career ==
Joseph has coached as an assistant at Northeast Louisiana, Louisiana Tech, Northwestern State University, Southern Mississippi, San Jose State University and Midwestern State University He enjoyed much success as an assistant coach, including turning San Jose State into one of the best offensive teams at the collegiate level.

Joseph was the first head football coach for the Belhaven College Blazers located in Jackson, Mississippi and he held that position for three seasons, from 1998 until 2000. During his three seasons there, the Blazers were 4-6 in 1998, and 7-4 in 1999 and 2000 (16-16 overall).

At Belhaven, Joseph became the only coach in the NAIA in history to produce both a 1,000-yard rusher and 1,000-yard receiver in a program's first two seasons of existence. His successful start of the football program helped him to lead Belhaven to a top 25 National ranking for six consecutive weeks in only the school's second season of play. Belhaven began its season with a 6-1 record, but lost the final three games of its season to finish 7-4.

Louisiana College in Pineville, Louisiana selected Joseph as head coach to replace Marty Secord for the 2004 season. The team went 5-5.

After one year at Louisiana, Joseph became the head coach at Mississippi College in Clinton, Mississippi beginning in the 2005 season, when the Choctaws went 2-8. The Choctaws finished 5-5 and 8-2 in 2006 and 2007, respectively. His 2008 squad began the season ranked #25 in the NCAA's Division III, but fell from the polls after an opening week, 42–6 defeat at the hands of rival Millsaps and finished the year 5-5. In 2009, the Choctaws finished 9-3 and reached the Division III playoffs. After 4 consecutive losing seasons, Joseph stepped down as the Choctaws head coach in 2013, prior to MC's move to Division II.

In 2024, Joseph returned to Northwestern State as the offensive coordinator and quarterbacks coach under new head coach Blaine McCorkle. In 2025, he shifted to assistant head coach and quarterbacks coach.

== Head coaching record ==
=== College ===
Year	Team	Overall	Conference	Standing	Bowl/playoffs
Belhaven Blazers (Mid-South Conference) (1998–2000)
1998	Belhaven	4–6	2–5	6th	
1999	Belhaven	7–4	4–3	4th	
2000	Belhaven	5–5	4–3	4th	
Belhaven:		16–15	10–11		
Louisiana College Wildcats (American Southwest Conference) (2004)
2004	Louisiana College	5–5	4–5	T–5th	
Louisiana College:		5–5	4–5		
Mississippi College Choctaws (American Southwest Conference) (2005–2013)
2005	Mississippi College	2–8	1–8	9th	
2006	Mississippi College	5–5	3–5	T–6th	
2007	Mississippi College	8–2	6–2	T–2nd	
2008	Mississippi College	5–5	5–3	T–3rd	
2009	Mississippi College	9–3	7–1	T–1st	L NCAA Division III Second Round
2010	Mississippi College	4–6	2–6	7th	
2011	Mississippi College	3–7	2–6	7th	
2012	Mississippi College	2–8	1–6	T–7th	
2013	Mississippi College	4–6	4–2	3rd	
Mississippi College:		42–50	31–39		
Total:		63–70			
National championship Conference title Conference division title or championship game berth

=== High school ===
Year	Team	Overall	Conference	Standing	Bowl/playoffs
McGill–Toolen Yellowjackets () (2021–2022)
2021	McGill–Toolen	7–5	5–2	3rd	
2022	McGill–Toolen	5–5	4–4	5th	
McGill–Toolen:		12–10	9–6		
Total:		12–10			
