= Blaine McCorkle =

American football coach (born 1976)

Current position
- Title: Head coach
- Team: Northwestern State
- Conference: Southland
- Record: 1–34
- Annual salary: $252,000

Biographical details
- Born: May 11, 1976 (age 50); Anniston, Alabama, U.S.
- Education: Louisiana State University (2000)

Playing career
- 1995–1998: LSU
- Position: Long snapper

Coaching career (HC unless noted)
- 1999: LSU (SA)
- 2000: Tennessee–Martin (WR)
- 2001–2002: Tennessee–Martin (OL)
- 2003–2004: Sewanee (OL)
- 2005: Liberty (OL)
- 2006: Chattanooga (TE/OT)
- 2007: Liberty (ST/OL)
- 2008: Tennessee Tech (OL)
- 2009–2011: Liberty (OL)
- 2012–2016: Richmond (OL)
- 2017: Delaware (OL)
- 2018–2023: Belhaven
- 2024–present: Northwestern State

Head coaching record
- Overall: 32–59
- Tournaments: 0–1 (NCAA D-III playoffs)

Accomplishments and honors

Championships
- 1 USA South (2023)

Awards
- USA South Coach of the Year (2023)

Samuel Blaine McCorkle IV (born May 11, 1976) is an American college football coach. He is the head football coach for Northwestern State University; a position he has hold since 2024. He was the head football coach for Belhaven University from 2018 to 2023. He also coached for LSU, Tennessee–Martin, Sewanee, Liberty, Chattanooga, Tennessee Tech, Richmond, and Delaware. He played college football as a long snapper for LSU.

== Personal life ==
McCorkle's cousin, Sammy, is the head football coach for Dartmouth College. Blaine's father, Sam, was the head football coach for Livingston University—now known as the University of West Alabama.

== Head coaching record ==
Year	Team	Overall	Conference	Standing	Bowl/playoffs
Belhaven Blazers (American Southwest Conference) (2018–2021)
2018	Belhaven	2–8	2–7	T–7th	
2019	Belhaven	2–8	2–7	9th	
2020–21	Belhaven	3–2	2–2	T–2nd (East)	
2021	Belhaven	7–3	6–3	T–3rd	
Belhaven Blazers (USA South Athletic Conference) (2022–2023)
2022	Belhaven	8–2	6–2	2nd	
2023	Belhaven	9–2	7–1	1st	L NCAA Division III First Round
Belhaven:		31–25	25–22		
Northwestern State Demons (Southland Conference) (2024–present)
2024	Northwestern State	0–12	0–7	9th	
2025	Northwestern State	1–11	0–8	10th	
Northwestern State:		1–23	0–15		
Total:		32–48			
National championship Conference title Conference division title or championship game berth
