= Louisiana Department of Wildlife & Fisheries – Enforcement Division =

Louisiana Department of Wildlife & Fisheries - Enforcement Division
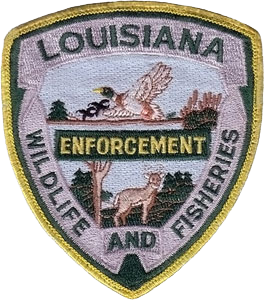

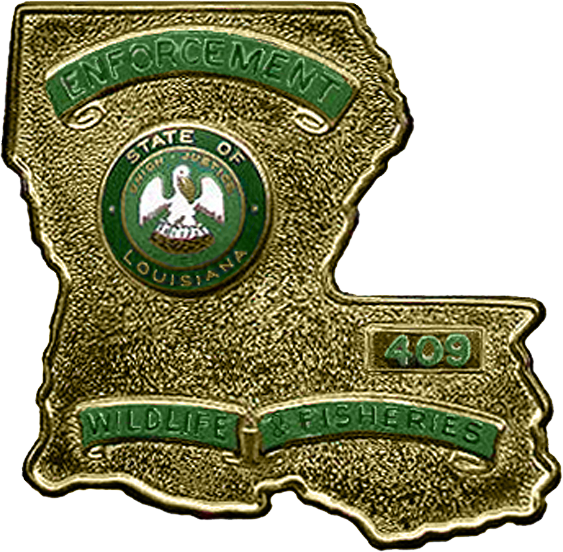
- Abbreviation: LDWF

Agency overview
- Formed: 1872
- Preceding agencies: Oyster Fishing Regulatory Board; Louisiana Board of Commissioners for the Protection of Birds, Game and Fish; Department of Conservation; Conservation Commission of Louisiana; Department of Conservation

Jurisdictional structure
- Operations jurisdiction: Louisiana, United States
- Area: 51,885 square miles (134,380 km^{2})
- Population: 4,468,976
- Legal jurisdiction: Louisiana
- General nature: Civilian police

Operational structure
- Headquarters: Baton Rouge, Louisiana
- Wildlife Enforcement Agents: 230 (2004)
- Agency executive: Colonel Stephen Clark, Chief of Enforcement Division
- Parent agency: Louisiana Department of Wildlife and Fisheries

Facilities
- Region Offices: 8

Website
- Website

The Louisiana Department of Wildlife & Fisheries – Enforcement Division (LDWF) is the fish & game regulatory agency of Louisiana. It has jurisdiction anywhere in the state and in state territorial waters. The agency enforces both state and federal laws dealing with hunting, fishing, and boating safety. The agency also enforces criminal laws in rural areas including DWI enforcement both on highways and waterways. Most of the Department's Wildlife Agents also carry Federal law enforcement commissions issued from the United States Department of the Interior - U.S. Fish and Wildlife Service, and United States Department of Commerce - U.S. National Marine Fisheries Service (NMFS). These federal commissions allow these state officers to enforce federal migratory waterfowl laws and federal marine fisheries laws in state and federal waters off the coast of Louisiana.

Besides their traditional role as a "game warden", Louisiana Wildlife Enforcement Agents also have a number of other responsibilities, including conducting board of health inspections on some portions of the state's commercial fishing industry. Agents are trained in and conduct numerous search and rescue operations, both in remote land areas and on the state's waterways. Agents ensure that hunters, anglers, boaters, dealers, breeders, farmers, and transporters are in compliance with regulations governing equipment, quotas, licenses, and registrations. Agents also assist other State departments and law enforcement agencies in the coordination of educational and professional endeavors, as well as national and state emergency alerts by the Federal Office of Emergency Preparedness. In addition, agents perform search and rescue missions alone or in conjunction with other local, state, and federal agencies.

The powers and access to private property of the LDWF, without a search warrant, are being challenged. If successful, this would not include federally owned or controlled enforcement laws.

== History ==
Louisiana's first wildlife conservation law was passed in 1857. The agency started out in 1872 as an Oyster Fishing Regulatory Board, with many more oyster regulations following in the 1880s. In 1909 a more formal body was created and given the task of overseeing wildlife and fisheries conservation in Louisiana. It was at that time called the Louisiana Board of Commissioners for the Protection of Birds, Game and Fish. In 1910, the Louisiana Oyster Commission (which had been created in 1902) merged with the Board of Commissioners to create the Louisiana Department of Conservation. In 1912, the Conservation Commission of Louisiana was formed as a department of State government, with the mission of providing for the protection of birds, fish, shellfish, wild quadrupeds, forestry and mineral resources of the state. In 1918 the name of the agency changed back to the Department of Conservation, and directed that it be controlled by an officer known as the Commissioner of Conservation, who would be appointed by the Governor, by and with the consent of the Senate, for a term of four years. In 1944, the Louisiana Department of Wild Life and Fisheries was officially created. In 1952, the agency's name was changed to the name Louisiana Wild Life and Fisheries Commission. The current Louisiana Department of Wildlife & Fisheries was created in 1975. The Enforcement Division eventually took over regulation of all hunting, fishing, and boating in the state of Louisiana. The agency employs over 200 Wildlife Agents. In 2005, the Enforcement Division was involved in extensive search and rescue missions in the New Orleans area following Hurricane Katrina. One of the Department's Agents, Sgt. Rachel Zechenelly, was named as one of Glamour Magazine's "2005 Women of the Year" for her role in rescue efforts.

== Patrol areas ==
The department is divided up into eight regions, with its headquarters in Baton Rouge. Each Region is divided into two or more districts. The Regions are divided as follows:

- Region 1 (Minden): covers the following Parishes (Similar to counties): Bossier, Caddo, Desoto, Bienville, Clairborne, Red River, Webster
- Region 2 (Monroe): covers the Parishes of: Jackson, Lincoln, Ouachita, Union, Morehouse, East Carroll, West Carroll, Richland, Caldwell, Franklin, Madison, Tensas
- Region 3 (Pineville): covers the Parishes of Winn, Grant, Rapides, Avoyelles, Natchitoches, Sabine, Vernon, LaSalle, Concordia, Catahoula.
- Region 4 (Opelousas): covers the Parishes of St. Landry, Pointe Coupee, Lafayette, West Baton Rouge, St. Martin (upper half), Iberville, and Iberia. This was the old Region 6.
- Region 5 (Lake Charles): covers the Parishes of Allen, Beauregard, Evangeline, Calcasieu, Cameron, Acadia, Jefferson Davis, Vermillion
- Region 6 (Thibodaux): covers the Parishes of Assumption, St. James, St. John the Baptist, St. Mary, St. Martin (lower half), and Lafourche, Terrebonne, Jefferson (Grand Isle area). This was the old Region 9.
- Region 7 (Baton Rouge): covers the Parishes of East Feliciana, West Feliciana, East Baton Rouge, Ascension, Tangipahoa, Livingston, St. Helena, St. Tammany and Washington.
- Region 8 (New Orleans): covers the Parishes of Jefferson, Orleans, St. Charles, Plaquemines and St. Bernard

In 2010, the old Region 4 office located in Ferriday was disbanded. The parishes under its control were divided between Region 2 and Region 3, and redistributed as shown above. The Region offices numbers were also redistributed, mainly affecting the redesignation of the Opelousas and Thibodaux offices. The old Region 4 covered the following parishes: Lasalle, Concordia, Catahoula, Caldwell, Franklin, Madison, and Tensas.

== Rank structure ==
The Louisiana Department of Wildlife & Fisheries Enforcement Division rank structure is as listed:

Rank	Insignia	
Colonel		One individual holds the position as chief of the Enforcement Division and has the rank of colonel. The colonel wears one silver-colored eagle on each epaulet.
Lieutenant Colonel		There are two officers with the rank of lieutenant colonel. Lieutenant colonels wear a silver-colored oak leaf on each epaulet.
Major		Majors are responsible for a command within the Enforcement Division. Majors wear one gold-colored oak leaf on each epaulet.
Captain		The specific responsibilities of a captain vary depending upon where they are assigned within the Agency. For example, a captain may be a region commander, or hold some other responsibility if assigned to headquarters. Captains wear two gold-colored bars on each epaulet.
Lieutenant		The responsibilities of a lieutenant vary within the department. At the region level, a lieutenant is typically the commander of a district. Other lieutenants at headquarters may command a unit. Lieutenants wear gold-colored metal bars on each epaulet.
Sergeant		At the region level, sergeants are assigned to oversee and act as coordinator over a parish. At headquarters and in some specialized units they perform other functions. Sergeants wear a metal pin consisting of three gold-colored inverted chevrons on each epaulet.
Corporal		At the region level, corporals serve as an assistant coordinator over a parish. A corporal may exercise a limited amount of supervisory authority when acting as a field training officer over junior ranking agents. To be eligible for promotion to corporal, an agent must have at least three years of experience with the Enforcement Division, and at least one year of experience as a Senior Agent. Corporals wear a metal pin consisting of two gold-colored inverted chevrons on each epaulet. This rank was created in 2017.
Senior Agent		Agents who have served two years of satisfactory or exceptional service are promoted to the rank of senior agent. Senior agents do not wear rank insignia.
Agent		This rank is attained by cadets upon successful completion of the training academy. Agents do not wear rank insignia.
Conservation Officer		This rank was discontinued in 1999. It was created in 1997 for commissioned wildlife specialists who had transferred to the Enforcement Division from other divisions of the agency. Conservation officers wore a tab on each sleeve denoting their status.
Cadet		A cadet is a raw recruit, and is the rank held by all personnel while assigned as a student at the training academy. Cadets do not wear rank insignia.

== Duty weapons ==
The current standard issue firearm for wildlife enforcement agents is the SIG Sauer semi-automatic pistol in .45 ACP. Each agent is also issued a Remington 870 Police 12 gauge shotgun. Agents are also issued (since Hurricane Katrina) SIG SG 551 carbines chambered for .223 Remington. These agents also come equipped with collapsible batons and pepper spray.

== Patrol vehicles ==
Louisiana Wildlife agents patrol in a wide variety of vehicles. The main patrol vehicles are four-wheel-drive pick-up trucks made by Ford, Dodge, or General Motors. The Ford Crown Victoria "Police Interceptor." is also used in some roles. A wide variety of watercraft are employed by the agency, most notably the Boston Whaler. Several different manufacturers' 4-wheeler ATVs are also used. The Enforcement Division also utilizes several single engine fixed winged aircraft, as well as several large offshore patrol boats.

== Special units ==
Like many other police agencies around the United States, LDWF has several sub-divisions in specialized tasks. LDWF/LED contains four specialized units with selected missions or purposes: the Special Operations Section; the Statewide Strike Force; the Maritime Special Response Team; and the Aviation Section. Agents in specialized units have developed specific skills, expertise and knowledge appropriate for their particular operational fields. Agents in specialized units operate in relatively broad geographic areas and may work alongside regional enforcement agents when appropriate.

The Special Operations Section houses covert operations in which undercover agents work to stem the illegal sale of fish and wildlife, develop information about ongoing criminal enterprises, and address major violations of state and federal law.

The Statewide Strike Force is assigned to work problem areas statewide. They devote attention to commercial fisheries operations and license fraud. Violations include smuggling, interstate commerce violations and false reporting, and under-reporting of commercial fish harvests. These agents provide regions with additional manpower on WMAs and places of high seasonal utilization, such as Grand Isle and other locations throughout the state. Strike Force agents also assist regional agents with oyster harvest enforcement, which primarily addresses harvesting oysters in closed waters, stealing from oyster leases and state grounds, and oyster size regulations.

The Maritime Special Response Team cooperative endeavor by the LDWF Enforcement Division and the Louisiana State Police SWAT team addresses maritime security threats within the state of Louisiana. The team provides a maritime tactical response capability at the state level in order to effectively provide public safety, officer safety, CBRNE prevention, and response and tactical support for LDWF's federal, state and local partners.

The Aviation Section contains two pilots and three airplanes. The Aviation Section's aircraft provide a valuable platform for detecting illegal hunting and fishing activities and frequently play a vital life-saving role in search and rescue operations. The Aviation Section also contributes its services to other divisions for biological missions, such as waterfowl counts and the monitoring of commercial fisheries.

== Privacy rights ==
Louisiana enforcement officers, as well as federal officers, operate under a United States Supreme Court ruling from the prohibition era (1920 to 1933), known as the "Open Field Doctrine" from Hester v. United States, 265 U.S. 57 (1924). Since then the courts have ruled it does not matter if land is fenced, Stark v. United States, 44 F.2d 946 (8th Cir. 1930), Janney v. United States, 206 F.2d 601 (4th Cir. 1953), or if there are no trespassing signs, McDowell v. United States, 383 F.2d 599 (8th Cir. 1967) as long as the curtilage of the home is not invaded, Wattenburg v. United States, 388 F.2d 853 (9th Cir. 1968) and United States v. Davis, 423 F.2d 974 (5th Cir. 1970). Evidence discovered does not have to be in plain view, "Care v. United States", 231 F.2d 22 (10th Cir. 1956).

The practice is being challenged by the Institute for Justice and Tom Manuel in light of the Louisiana Constitution of 1974 and the "Criminal trespass" law. The claim is whether land is considered property and whether the legality of warrantless, permissionless searches is unconstitutional on private property The case is based on the Louisiana Constitution of 1974, Article I, Section 5, Right to Privacy:

"Every person shall be secure in his person, property, communications, houses, papers, and effects against unreasonable searches, seizures, or invasions of privacy. No warrant shall issue without probable cause supported by oath or affirmation, and particularly describing the place to be searched, the persons or things to be seized, and the lawful purpose or reason for the search. Any person adversely affected by a search or seizure conducted in violation of this Section shall have standing to raise its illegality in the appropriate court."

Many states give broad powers to fish and wildlife officers. Some states limit warrantless searches to reasonable suspicion or probable cause of a crime. States have enacted privacy legislation: Mississippi, Montana, New York, Oregon, South Dakota, Tennessee, Vermont, and Washington have rejected the "Open Field" Doctrine. Pennsylvania has sided with the Open Field Doctrine, but this is being challenged.

== Fallen officers ==
Since its formation, 11 Louisiana Department of Wildlife and Fisheries agents have been killed in the line of duty.

Officer's Name	End Of Watch	Cause Of Death
Agent Robert J. Sellers, Sr.	Tuesday, March 13, 1923	Gunfire
Agent Frank E. Fagot, Jr.	Tuesday, November 29, 1927	Gunfire
Game Warden Edward Morgan	Saturday, April 5, 1930	Gunfire
Game Warden Beuford Calvin Patterson	Wednesday, October 27, 1948	Automobile crash
Agent Kenneth Dale Aycock	Saturday, July 6, 1991	Drowned
Agent Ricky Dodge	Tuesday, January 21, 1992	ATV accident
Senior Agent Leon "Buddy" Henderson, Jr.	Tuesday, March 12, 1996	Automobile crash
Captain John M. Garlington	Thursday, February 10, 2000	Drowned
Senior Agent Jim Robyn Bennet Matkin	Wednesday, March 2, 2005	Automobile accident
Sergeant Paul Stuckey	Friday, September 30, 2011	Gunfire
Cadet Immanuel James Washington	Thursday, July 19, 2018	Heart attack

== See also ==
- List of law enforcement agencies in Louisiana
- Louisiana Wildlife Agents Association
- Louisiana State Police
- Louisiana State Troopers Association
- Game warden
