= Wildlife agent =

Wildlife agent may refer to:

- An agent of the United States Fish and Wildlife Service
- An officer rank in the Louisiana Department of Wildlife & Fisheries - Enforcement Division, in this context, it is a rank below Senior Agent, yet above Cadet. This rank has no rank insignia. Agents who complete 6 months of satisfactory or exceptional service are promoted to the rank of Agent.
