= North Louisiana Refuge Complex =

Group of United States wildlife refuges

North Louisiana Refuges Complex
- IUCN category IV (habitat/species management area)
- Location: North Louisiana, United States
- Governing body: United States Fish and Wildlife Service
- Website: www.fws.gov/northlouisiana/

North Louisiana Refuges Complex is a National Wildlife Refuge complex located in the state of Louisiana, managed by the United States Fish and Wildlife Service. This complex is part of the National Wildlife Refuge System, a nationwide network of lands and waters committed to the conservation of wildlife habitats.

== Refuges within the complex ==
- Black Bayou Lake National Wildlife Refuge
- D'Arbonne National Wildlife Refuge
- Handy Brake National Wildlife Refuge
- Louisiana Wetland Management District
- Red River National Wildlife Refuge
- Upper Ouachita National Wildlife Refuge
