= List of shipwrecks in December 1881 =

The list of shipwrecks in December 1881 includes ships sunk, foundered, grounded, or otherwise lost during December 1881.

== 1 December ==
List of shipwrecks: 1 December 1881
Ship	State	Description
Artushof	Germany	The steamship was driven ashore at Vestervik, Sweden. She was on a voyage from Burntisland, Fife, United Kingdom to Flensburg.
Eschol	United Kingdom	The steamship was driven ashore on Texel, North Holland, Netherlands. She was on a voyage from Kurrachee, India to Hamburg, Germany.
Hurworth	United Kingdom	The steamship foundered in the Atlantic Ocean. Her crew were rescued by the steamship Germanic (United Kingdom). Hurworth was on a voyage from Montreal, Quebec, Canada to Rotterdam, South Holland, Netherlands.
USS Rodgers	United States Navy	The barque-rigged steamer, burning since 30 November after a fire started in her hold, sank in Saint Lawrence Bay off the Chukotka Peninsula, Russia without loss of life after her magazine exploded.

== 2 December ==
List of shipwrecks: 2 December 1881
Ship	State	Description
Earl of Lonsdale	United Kingdom	The steamship caught fire at Messina, Sicily, Italy.
Harefield	United Kingdom	The steamship was driven ashore at Flamborough Head, Yorkshire.
Kildare	United Kingdom	The ship was driven ashore and wrecked at Old Stair's Castle, Aberdeen with the loss of all thirteen rew.
L. C. Owen	United Kingdom	The brigantine was driven ashore at Blakeney, Norfolk.
Seaton	United Kingdom	The schooner ran aground off Seaham, County Durham. She was refloated but had to be beached 5 nautical miles (9.3 km) south of Seaham.
W. I. Whiting	United Kingdom	The barque was abandoned in the Atlantic Ocean. Her crew were rescued by the steamship Salerno (United Kingdom). W. I. Whiting was on a voyage from Liverpool, Lancashire to New York, United States.

== 3 December ==
List of shipwrecks: 3 December 1881
Ship	State	Description
City of Bath	United Kingdom	The steamship was abandoned in the Atlantic Ocean with the loss of four of the 27 people on board. Survivors took to a boat; three more died before they were rescued by the barque M. G. Foley ( Canada) on 6 December, and her captain died on 9 December. City of Bath was on a voyage from Bristol, Gloucestershire to New York, United States.
Forward Ho	United Kingdom	The barque was driven ashore and wrecked at Sendai, Japan. Her crew were rescued. She was on a voyage from Kobe, Japan to Portland, Dorset.
Hermes	United Kingdom	The ship departed from Greenock, Renfrewshire for San Francisco, California, United States. No further trace, reported missing.

== 4 December ==
List of shipwrecks: 4 December 1881
Ship	State	Description
Henriette	United Kingdom	The ship ran aground on the Havdegrind Rocks. She was on a voyage from Danzig, Germany to Barrow-in-Furness, Lancashire. She was refloated and taken in to Foula, Shetland Islands.
Sirio	Norway	The schooner was abandoned in the Atlantic Ocean (43°00′N 19°45′W). Her crew were rescued by Indian Chief (United Kingdom). Sirio was on a voyage from Bordeaux, Gironde, France to a port in New Brunswick, Canada.

== 5 December ==
List of shipwrecks: 5 December 1881
Ship	State	Description
Jane Miller	United States	The steamship foundered in Georgian Bay.
Wolsey	United Kingdom	The lighter sank in the Victoria Docks, London.

== 6 December ==
List of shipwrecks: 6 December 1881
Ship	State	Description
Henriette	United Kingdom	The crewless ship was driven out to sea from Foula, Shetland Islands. She was last sighted off Skagen, Denmark on 13 December.
Striver	United Kingdom	The fishing smack departed from Ramsgate, Kent. No further trace, presumed foundered with the loss of all four crew.

== 7 December ==
List of shipwrecks: 7 December 1881
Ship	State	Description
Clara Felicia	United Kingdom	The ship ran aground on the Bembridge Ledge, off the Isle of Wight. She was on a voyage from Newcastle upon Tyne, Northumberland to Bristol, Gloucestershire. She was refloated and taken in to Cowes, Isle of Wight.
Mary Ann Anderson	United Kingdom	The ship foundered off St Abb's Head, Berwickshire. Her crew were rescued. She was on a voyage from the River Tyne to Eyemouth, Berwickshire.

== 8 December ==
List of shipwrecks: 8 December 1881
Ship	State	Description
John Marychurch	United Kingdom	The steamship ran aground near Nicholaieff, Russia.
Macedonia	United Kingdom	The steamship ran aground in the Amur.
Malaleel	Austria-Hungary	The barque hit the Shark's Fin, the northernmost rock of the Longships Reef, Cornwall, United Kingdom and became a total wreck. She was on a voyage from Bordeaux, Gironde, France to Cardiff, Glamorgan, United Kingdom. Wreckage was washed up below the Levant mine and in Portheras Cove.

== 9 December ==
List of shipwrecks: 9 December 1881
Ship	State	Description
Adler	Germany	The brig was driven ashore at "Gammelsby", Öland, Sweden.
Chin Chin	(United Kingdom of Great Britain and Ireland) Jersey	The barque was driven ashore and wrecked at the South Foreland, Kent. Her crew survived; five were rescued by the Dover Lifeboat assisted by a tug, the rest reached shore in a boat. She was on a voyage from South Shields, County Durham to Jersey, Channel Islands.
Lynn	United Kingdom	The steamship ran aground in Robin Hoods Bay. She was on a voyage from London to the River Tyne. She was refloated with the assistance of a tug and resumed her voyage.

== 10 December ==
List of shipwrecks: 10 December 1881
Ship	State	Description
Juno	Flag unknown	The ship was destroyed by fire at Amsterdam, North Holland, Netherlands.
Marie Fleurie	United Kingdom	The steamship sank at Workington, Cumberland. She was on a voyage from Bilbao, Spain to Workington. She was refloated on 13 December and taken in to Workington.
Rhiwabon	United Kingdom	The steamship ran aground on the Jenisher Bank, in the Dardanelles. She was on a voyage from Odesa, Russia to Malta. She was refloated with assistance the next day.

== 11 December ==
List of shipwrecks: 11 December 1881
Ship	State	Description
Annie	United Kingdom	The ship foundered in the Irish Sea 7 nautical miles (13 km) east of Point Lynas, Anglesey. Her crew were rescued. She was on a voyage from Port Dinorwic, Caernarfonshire to Paisley, Renfrewshire.
Foam	United Kingdom	The yawl ran aground on the Mixen Sandbank, in the English Channel off the coast of Sussex, and sank. Her crew survived.
Ithington	United Kingdom	The steamship ran aground on the Swash, in the Bristol Channel. She was on a voyage from Avonmouth, Somerset to New York, United States. She was refloated and resumed her voyage.

== 12 December ==
List of shipwrecks: 12 December 1881
Ship	State	Description
Mary Ellis	United Kingdom	The ship ran aground on the Brambles, in the Solent. She was on a voyage from Sunderland, County Durham to Southampton, Hampshire.
Mary and Julia	United Kingdom	The ship was run down and sunk by the steamship Bendigo (United Kingdom) with the loss of all hands. Mary and Julia was on a voyage from Porthcawl, Glamorgan to Lisbon, Portugal.
Young Alfred	United Kingdom	The fishing smack was run into by the fishing vessel Ada (United Kingdom) and sank in the North Sea. Her crew were rescued by the fishing smack Confidence (United Kingdom).

== 13 December ==
List of shipwrecks: 13 December 1881
Ship	State	Description
Arica	United Kingdom	The brig was driven ashore 1 nautical mile (1.9 km) south of St Mary's Island, Northumberland. Her seven crew were rescued by a coble. She was on a voyage from Söderhamn, Sweden to Whitby, Yorkshire. She was refloated on 20 December and taken in to the River Tyne in a waterlogged condition.
Moorsley	United Kingdom	The steamship was wrecked at "Inderripene", Norway. Her crew were rescued. She was on a voyage from Newcastle upon Tyne, Northumberland to Trondheim, Norway.
Seano	Italy	The brigantine was driven ashore on Skagen, Denmark. She was on a voyage from Skutskär, Sweden to Marseille, Bouches-du-Rhône, France.

== 14 December ==
List of shipwrecks: 14 December 1881
Ship	State	Description
Craigrownie	United Kingdom	The steamship struck the North Rock, in Cloghy Bay and was wrecked. Her crew were rescued by the Coastguard. She was on a voyage from Bilbao, Spain to Troon, Ayrshire.
Gemma, and Metropolitan	Germany; United Kingdom	The steamship Metropolitan was run into by the steamship Gemma and sank in the River Thames at Woolwich, Kent. All on board were rescued by the steam launch Ethel (United Kingdom) and a number of wherries. Metropolitan was on a voyage from London to Hull, Yorkshire. Gemma was on a voyage from Hamburg to London. She was severely damaged at the bow. She completed her voyage and was placed under repair.

== 15 December ==
List of shipwrecks: 15 December 1881
Ship	State	Description
Blanche, and Cynhaiarn	United Kingdom	The steamship Blanche and the schooner Cynhaiarn collided off the North Foreland, Kent. Cynhaiarn sank with the loss of one of her crew. Survivors were rescued by Blanche, which was on a voyage from London to Dunkirk, Nord, France. She put in to Ramsgate, Kent waterlogged at the bow.
Captain McClintock	United Kingdom	The steamship ran aground at Garston, Lancashire and was severely damaged. She was on a voyage from Dublin to Liverpool, Lancashire. She was refloated.
Eros	United Kingdom	The steamship was run into by another steamship and sank in the River Mersey at Liverpool, Lancashire. Three of her 23 crew were reported missing. She was on a voyage from Glasgow, Renfrewshire to Alexandria, Egypt.
Isle of Arran	United Kingdom	The ship was driven ashore at Redcar, Yorkshire. She was on a voyage from Bilbao, Spain to Middlesbrough, Yorkshire.
Nile	United Kingdom	The barque collided with the steamship Andalusian (United Kingdom) and sank in the North Sea 15 nautical miles (28 km) east south east of Orfordness, Suffolk. Her crew were rescued by Andalusian. Nile was on a voyage from Alloa, Clackmannanshire to Demerara, British Guiana.
Roseina	United Kingdom	The schooner ran aground on the Newcombe Sand, in the North Sea off the coast of Suffolk. She was on a voyage from Aberdeen to London. She was refloated and resumed her voyage.

== 16 December ==
List of shipwrecks: 16 December 1881
Ship	State	Description
Masonic	United Kingdom	The schooner was run into by a barge at Gravesend, Kent and was severely damaged. She was beached.
Thergny	Sweden	The barque ran aground on the Swash, in the Bristol Channel off the coast of Somerset, United Kingdom. She was on a voyage from Cardiff, Glamorgan, United Kingdom to Gothenburg.
Victor Marie	France	The schooner was wrecked on the English Grounds with the loss of her captain. She was on a voyage from "Poulegen" to Bristol, Gloucestershire, United Kingdom.
Unnamed	France	The lugger was driven ashore west of Rye Harbour, Sussex, United Kingdom.

== 17 December ==
List of shipwrecks: 17 December 1881
Ship	State	Description
Bertha	United Kingdom	The schooner was driven ashore at Dunfanaghy, County Donegal. She had been refloated by 24 December.
Caribbean	United Kingdom	The steamship caught fire at sea. She was on a voyage from Baltimore, Maryland, United States to Liverpool, Lancashire. She completed her voyage and the fire was extinguished.
Constance	United Kingdom	The schooner ran aground and was wrecked at the mouth of the Hayle River. All on board were rescued by the Hayle Lifeboat Isis ( Royal National Lifeboat Institution). Constance was on a voyage from Newport, Monmouthshire to Santander, Spain.
Providence	United Kingdom	The smack was run into by the steamship Xema (United Kingdom) and sank at Rochestown, County Cork. Her crew were rescued.
Sylphide	United Kingdom	The sloop ran aground in the River Tyne. She was later refloated and towed in to Sunderland, County Durham in a leaky condition.

== 18 December ==
List of shipwrecks: 18 December 1881
Ship	State	Description
Benton	United Kingdom	The steamship ran ashore at Redcar, Yorkshire. She was on a voyage from Bilbao, Spain to Middlesbrough, Yorkshire. She was refloated the next day with the assistance to two tugs.
Dieppe	United Kingdom	The steamship was run into by the steamship Victoria (United Kingdom) and sank at Dieppe, Seine-Inférieure, France.
Hermanns Theodarus	Netherlands	The galiot was abandoned in the North Sea 30 nautical miles (56 km) off Lowestoft, Suffolk, United Kingdom. Her crew were rescued by the fishing smack Dolphin (United Kingdom). Hermanns Theodarus was on a voyage from Hamburg, Germany to London, United Kingdom.
Marie Joseph	France	The brigantine was driven ashore at Preston, Dorset.
Saggita	Germany	The barque was driven ashore and wrecked at Fairlight, Sussex, United Kingdom with the loss of seven of her eight crew.
Susie	United Kingdom	The barque sprang a leak and foundered in the North Sea 80 nautical miles (150 km) north north west of Texel, North Holland, Netherlands. She was on a voyage from Hamburg to Wilmington, Delaware, United States.
Tripolia	Sweden	The steamship ran aground in a storm at Ouddorp, South Holland, Netherlands with the loss of five or six of her crew.
Triton	Germany	The brig was abandoned at sea. Her crew were rescued by the smack Clara (United Kingdom). Triton was on a voyage from a Swedish port to Ghent, East Flanders, Belgium.

== 19 December ==
List of shipwrecks: 19 December 1881
Ship	State	Description
Espiègle	France	The smack was driven ashore at Brean Down, Somerset, United Kingdom. Her crew were rescued. She was on a voyage from Saint-Malo, Ille-et-Vilaine to Cardiff, Glamorgan, United Kingdom.
Hilarion	United Kingdom	The barque was run into by the steamship Odin (Sweden) and sank in the River Thames at Tilbury, Essex with the loss of two of her crew.
Mercur	Norway	The barque was abandoned in the North Sea. Her fourteen crew were rescued by the smack G. and E. (United Kingdom). Mercur was on a voyage from Sundsvall, Sweden to Antwerp, Belgium. She was subsequently taken in to IJmuiden, North Holland in a waterlogged condition.
Orient	Sweden	The schooner struck a sunken wreck north of the Dogger Bank and was damaged. She was on a voyage from Waldemarsvik to London, United Kingdom. She put in to Harwich, Essex, United Kingdom on 2 January 1882 and was subsequently towed to London.
Richard Tolle	France	The tug was driven ashore at Cayeux-sur-Mer, Somme. Her twelve crew were rescued. She was on a voyage from Rouen, Seine-Inférieure to Senegal.
Water Witch	United Kingdom	The shrimper collided with Parthenia (United Kingdom) and capsized in the River Mersey. Her crew were rescued.

== 20 December ==
List of shipwrecks: 20 December 1881
Ship	State	Description
Blodwen	United Kingdom	The steamship ran aground in the Scheldt. She was on a voyage from Calcutta, India to Antwerp, Belgium. She was refloated the next day with the assistance of four tugs and taken in to Antwerp.
Matanzas	United States	The full-rigged ship was driven ashore at Batavia, Netherlands East Indies. She was on a voyage from New York to Cheribon, Netherlands East Indies. She was refloated and taken in to Batavia.
Portland	United Kingdom	The barque was driven ashore east of Dunkirk, Nord, France. She was on a voyage from Timaru, New Zealand to Dunkirk. She sank the next day.
Rosa	Spain	The schooner drove from her anchors at the Nore and went ashore at Leysdown, Isle of Sheppey, Kent, United Kingdom. All on board survived. She was refloated.
Runnymede	United Kingdom	The whaler, a barque. was driven ashore at Albany, New York, United States.
Union	United Kingdom	The ship was driven ashore and wrecked in Saint Ouen's Bay, Jersey, Channel Islands with the loss of her captain. She was on a voyage from Saint-Malo, Ille-et-Vilaine, France to Portsmouth, Hampshire.
Unnamed	United Kingdom	The steamship foundered 20 nautical miles (37 km) north west of the Île de Batz, Finistère, France.

== 21 December ==
List of shipwrecks: 21 December 1881
Ship	State	Description
Annie	United Kingdom	The schooner foundered off Stranraer, Wigtownshire. Her crew were rescued by a Coastguard boat.
Circassian	United Kingdom	The schooner was wrecked at "Glendrishaig" with the loss of two of her four crew. She was on a voyage from Dundalk, County Louth to Troon, Ayrshire.
Glance	United Kingdom	The barque sank off Texel, North Holland, Netherlands. Her eight crew were rescued by the smack Thrive (United Kingdom). Glance was on a voyage from Goole, Yorkshire to Torquay, Devon.
Johann	Germany	The galiot was driven ashore at Lemvig, Denmark. She was on a voyage from Fredrikstadt, Denmark to Leer.
Lenita	Germany	The schooner was driven ashore at Wyk auf Föhr. She was on a voyage from Cuxhaven to Ciudad Bolívar, Venezuela.
Mary Catherine	United Kingdom	The ship was driven ashore at Dunfanaghy, County Donegal. She had been refloated by 24 December.
Mary Julia	United Kingdom	The schooner was run down by a steamship with the loss of all hands.
Soridderen	Norway	The barque was abandoned in the Bay of Biscay. Her eleven crew were rescued by the steamship Peninsular (United Kingdom). Soridderen was on a voyage from Cádiz, Spain to "Burgoyne".

== 23 December ==
List of shipwrecks: 23 December 1881
Ship	State	Description
Granger	United States	The steamship was destroyed by fire at Charleston, South Carolina with the loss of two lives.
Thomas Boustead	United Kingdom	The ship ran aground at the mouth of the Rio Grande. She was later refloated.
Vanguard	United Kingdom	The tug was crushed between the steamship Sanda (United Kingdom) and the quayside at Glasgow, Renfrewshire and was severely damaged.
Veneranda	Italy	The barque was run down and sunk in the Atlantic Ocean (54°19′N 45°10′W) by the steamship Moselle (United Kingdom). Her crew were rescued by Moselle. Veneranda was on a voyage from Baltimore, Maryland, United States to Cardiff, Glamorgan, United Kingdom.

== 24 December ==
List of shipwrecks: 24 December 1881
Ship	State	Description
Annie, and Esmerald	United Kingdom	The steamship collided in the River Tyne and were both severely damaged. Annie was on a voyage from Antwerp, Belgium to Jarrow, Northumberland.
Bessie Wittich	United States	The ship departed from Pensacola, Floridafor the Clyde. No further trace, reported missing.
Braunschweig	Germany	The steamship sank at Bremen. She was refloated on 27 December.
Devonia	United Kingdom	The steamship was driven ashore at Boulmer, Northumberland. She was on a voyage from Bergen, Norway to the River Tyne. She was refloated on 3 January 1882 and assisted into the River Tyne by tugs.
Dugald Stewart	United Kingdom	The ship struck the Bassel Rock, off Guernsey, Channel Islands and sank. Her crew were rescued.
Emma Catharina	Germany	The ship was driven ashore at Gothenburg, Sweden.
Hebe	Sweden	The ship was driven ashore at Gothenburg.
Jane	United Kingdom	The schooner was driven ashore at Wigtown. She was on a voyage from Maryport, Cumberland to Stranraer, Wigtownshire. She was refloated with assistance from Rona (United Kingdom) and towed in to Garliestown, Wigtownshire.
Preponmenon	Greece	The brig was driven ashore on Lissa, Austria-Hungary. She was on a voyage from Trieste to Syros.
Sydenham	United Kingdom	The steamship caught fire at Alexandria, Egypt.
Théophile Félix	France	The schooner was driven ashore at Lydd, Kent, United Kingdom. She was on a voyage from Nantes, Loire-Inférieure to Rotterdam, South Holland, Netherlands.

== 25 December ==
List of shipwrecks: 25 December 1881
Ship	State	Description
Aurora	Norway	The barque ran aground on the Nyground, in the Baltic Sea and sank with the loss of all hands. She was on a voyage from Reval, Russia to Pillau, Germany.
Helenslea	United Kingdom	The barque was run down and sank off Roche's Point, County Cork by the steamship Catalonia (United Kingdom) with the loss of nine of her 25 crew. Helenslea was on a voyage from San Francisco, California, United States to Queenstown, County Cork.
Iris	Russia	The barque was driven ashore at Queenstown.
Janet Johnston	United Kingdom	The ship was driven ashore at Burghhead, Moray. She was refloated on 2 January 1882 and towed in to Lossiemouth.
Skulda	Norway	The brig was driven ashore and wrecked at "Jedderen". She was on a voyage from South Shields, County Durham, United Kingdom to Stavanger.

== 26 December ==
List of shipwrecks: 26 December 1881
Ship	State	Description
Ann Griffiths	United Kingdom	The schooner was wrecked at Veracruz, Mexico.
Mary	Canada	The schooner was abandoned in the Atlantic Ocean. All on board were rescued by the steamship Scythia (United Kingdom).
Wermland	Sweden	The steamship was driven ashore at Kristianopel.

== 27 December ==
List of shipwrecks: 27 December 1881
Ship	State	Description
Carlo	United Kingdom	The steamship ran aground in the Dardanelles. She was on a voyage from Odesa, Russia to Dunkirk, Nord, France. She was refloated with the assistance of a tug.
Hantoon	United Kingdom	The barque collided with the steamship Rothesay and sank with the loss of four of her crew. Hantoon was on a voyage from Constantinople, Ottoman Empire to Wexford.

== 28 December ==
List of shipwrecks: 28 December 1881
Ship	State	Description
Fanny	Denmark	The brig collided with the steamship Keroula (United Kingdom) and sank in the Mediterranean Sea 3 nautical miles (5.6 km) off Messina, Sicily, Italy. Her crew were rescued. Fanny was on a voyage from Stockholm, Sweden to Trieste.
Gellert	Germany	The steamship ran ashore near Cuxhaven.
Frederick Franc, and St. Pauli	France; Germany	The steamship St. Pauli collided with the steamship Frederic Franc off "Bielenburg" and sank. Her crew were rescued by Frederic Franc. St. Pauli was on a voyage from Hamburg to Sunderland, County Durham, United Kingdom. Frederic Franc was severely damaged at the bow and was beached on the Pagensand. She was on a voyage from Havre de Grâce, Seine-Inférieure to Hamburg. She was refloated and arrived at Hamburg the next day.

== 29 December ==
List of shipwrecks: 29 December 1881
Ship	State	Description
Convivial	United Kingdom	The schooner was driven ashore at Maryport, Cumberland.
Fanny	United Kingdom	The brigantine was driven ashore 1 1/2 nautical miles (2.8 km) south of Flamborough Head, Yorkshire. She was refloated and taken in to Scarborough, Yorkshire.
Leading Wind	United Kingdom	The ship was driven ashore at Surabaya, Netherlands East Indies. She was refloated on 2 January 1882.
Provence	France	The steamship was rammed and sunk at Constantinople, Ottoman Empire by the steamship Azoff (Russia). All on board survived.Provence was on a voyage from Constantinople to Marseille, Bouche-du-Rhône.
St. Peterburg	Russia	The steamship ran aground on the Donaslan Shoal. She was on a voyage from Shanghai, China to Odesa.
Theta	United Kingdom	The ship caught fire and was scuttled at Stanley, Falkland Islands. She was on a voyage from Swansea, Glamorgan to Valparaíso, Chile

== 30 December ==
List of shipwrecks: 30 December 1881
Ship	State	Description
Liddesdale	United Kingdom	The ship ran aground in the Scheldt at "Hompels". She was refloated.
Rosa B.	United States	The steamship was destroyed by fire at Bayou D'Arbonne, Louisiana with the loss of a crew member.

== Unknown date ==
List of shipwrecks: Unknown date in December 1881
Ship	State	Description
Agostina C	Italy	The ship was driven ashore and wrecked at Cape Charles, Virginia, United States. She was on a voyage from Catania, Sicily to Baltimore, Maryland, United States.
Alfred	United Kingdom	The brig was abandoned in the North Sea. She was subsequently taken in to Vlissingen, Zeeland, Netherlands by Dutch fishermen.
Altmore	United Kingdom	The steamship ran aground in the Suez Canal.
Amulet	Netherlands	The steamship ran aground at the Hoek van Holland, South Holland. She was on a voyage from Leith, Lothian, United Kingdom to Rotterdam, South Holland.
Anna Charlotte	Sweden	The brig was driven ashore on Skagen, Denmark. She was on a voyage from Grimsby, Lincolnshire, United Kingdom to Helsinki, Grand Duchy of Finland.
Annie Bogart	United Kingdom	The brigantine was wrecked on Grindstone Island, Canada with some loss of life.
Arran	United Kingdom	The steamship ran aground on the Alligator Reef and became severely leaky.
Bassano	United Kingdom	The steamship ran aground in the Humber. She was on a voyage from Alexandria, Egypt to Hull, Yorkshire. She was refloated and taken in to Hull.
Bessemer	United Kingdom	The steamship was run into by the steamship Henry Fisher (United Kingdom) in the River Thames. She was beached with assistance from the steamship Naiad (United Kingdom).
Collina	United Kingdom	The schooner was driven ashore at Spurn Point, Yorkshire. She was refloated with assistance from the Spurn Lifeboat and the tugboat Samson (United Kingdom) and taken in to Grimsby in a severely leaky condition.
Concurrenten	Sweden	The barque was abandoned in the Atlantic Ocean before 15 December. She was towed in to A Coruña, Spain on 12 April 1882.
Eliza	Sweden	The barque was driven ashore at Mablethorpe, Lincolnshire. She was on a voyage from Helsinki to Grimsby.
Ellen Stuart	United Kingdom	The ship was destroyed by fire at Calcutta, India before 23 December.
Endeavour	United Kingdom	The tug was run into by the barque Cricket (United Kingdom) and sank in The Downs. Her crew survived.
England	United Kingdom	The steamship ran aground in the Danube at Sulina, Kingdom of Romania. She was refloated.
Era	United Kingdom	The barque was driven ashore at Figueira da Foz, Portugal. She was on a voyage from the Newfoundland Colony to Lisbon, Portugal.
Esperance	France	The schooner was driven ashore and wrecked at Trouville-sur-Mer, Calvados. She was on a voyage from Swansea, Glamorgan, United Kingdom to Trouville-sur-Mer.
Etna	Norway	The barque was abandoned in the Atlantic Ocean before 24 December.
Eugenia Auguste	France	The schooner was driven ashore at Port Erin, Isle of Man.
Fanny	Sweden	The brig was driven ashore at Alby, Öland. She was on a voyage from Oxelösund to London, United Kingdom.
Françoise Marie	France	The sloop was driven ashore at Saint-Quentin-en-Tourmont, Somme with the loss of all hands.
Frederick	United Kingdom	The full-rigged ship was abandoned at sea. Some of her crew were rescued by the steamship W. A. Scholten (Netherlands). Frederick was on a voyage from Quebec City, Canada to the Clyde.
Gad's Hill	United Kingdom	The ship was destroyed by fire at sea. Her crew were rescued by Syria (United Kingdom). Gad's Hill was on a voyage from Liverpool, Lancashire to Rangoon, Burma.
George Dundas	United Kingdom	The ship ran aground on the North Bank and sank. She was on a voyage from Caernarfon to Silloth, Cumberland.
Gunn	Norway	The barque was driven ashore on Nidingen, Sweden. She was on a voyage from Stettin, Germany to New York, United States.
Harriet	United Kingdom	The schooner was abandoned in the Atlantic Ocean. Her crew survived. She was on a voyage from Saint John's, Newfoundland Colony to Cádiz, Spain.
Harworth	United Kingdom	The steamship was abandoned in the Atlantic Ocean. Her crew were rescued by Germanic (United Kingdom). Harworth was on a voyage from Montreal, Quebec, Canada to Rotterdam.
H. B. Jones	Canada	The ship was driven ashore and wrecked on Fogo Island, Newfoundland Colony.
Hector	United Kingdom	The steamship was driven ashore on the Marquesas Keys before 15 December. She was on a voyage from New Orleans, Louisiana, United States to Liverpool. She was later refloated and taken in to Key West, Florida, United States.
Heinrich Diercks	Germany	The barque sprang a leak and sank in the North Sea. Her crew were rescued. She was on a voyage from Liverpool to Danzig.
Henry Scholefield	United Kingdom	The steamship was driven ashore at Netherton, Cumberland. Eleven of her 22 crew were rescued, eleven remained aboard. She was on a voyage from London to Whitehaven, Cumberland.
Her Majestey	United Kingdom	The barque foundered in the Atlantic Ocean. At least some of her crew survived.
Hollandia	United Kingdom	The steamship ran aground in the Oude Vlie. She was on a voyage from London to Harlingen, Friesland, Netherlands.
Hospodar	United Kingdom	The ship was driven ashore at Callantsoog, North Holland, Netherlands. She was on a voyage from Bremerhaven, Germany to Liverpool.
Iceberg	United States	The full-rigged ship ran aground in the Bangka Strait. She was on a voyage from Hong Kong to New York.
Isabella Wilson	United Kingdom	The schooner ran aground and sank in the Sound of Islay.
Jack Star	United Kingdom	The smack ran aground on the Shoals of Selsey, in the English Channel off the coast of Sussex. Her four crew were rescued.
James	Norway	The barque was abandoned at sea. She was subsequently taken in to Terschelling, Frieslnad, Netherlands.
Janny	United Kingdom	The sloop was driven ashore at Donna Nook, Lincolnshire. She was on a voyage from King's Lynn, Norfolk to Goole, Yorkshire.
Janus	Norway	The barque was abandoned at sea. Her crew were rescued. She was on a voyage from Gävle, Sweden to Lowestoft, Suffolk, United Kingdom.
Jasmine	United Kingdom	The steamship ran aground in the Danube at Sulina, Romania.
Jens Brandi	Norway	The barque ran aground and capsized at Sunderland, County Durham, United Kingdom.
Johanne	Germany	The schooner was abandoned in the North Sea 60 nautical miles (110 km) off the Norwegian coast before 16 December. Her crew were rescued by the steamship Constance (United Kingdom), which towed Johanne in to Banff Bay.
Jubilee	United Kingdom	The ship was driven ashore at the mouth of the River Tees. She was on a voyage from Bilbao, Spain to Middlesbrough, Yorkshire.
Kinderdijk	Netherlands	The ship was driven ashore at Egmond aan Zee, North Holland.
Laura Ethel	United Kingdom	The ship was driven ashore and wrecked at Whitehaven. Her crew were rescued. She was on a voyage from Cartagena, Spain to Workington, Cumberland.
Lord Hawkes	United Kingdom	The smack was driven ashore at Dielette, Manche, France. She was on a voyage from "Dahonet" to Poole, Dorset.
Lucinda Jane	United Kingdom	The schooner was driven ashore at Wexford.
Macchiavelli	Italy	The barque ran aground in the Saltee Islands, County Wexford and sank 1 nautical mile (1.9 km) east of the Hook Lighthouse. Her crew were rescued by a British steamship. Macchiavelli was on a voyage from Taganrog to Liverpool.
Margaret Boyd	United Kingdom	The schooner foundered in the Atlantic Ocean. Her crew were rescued by Flora (Germany). Margaret Boyd was on a voyage from Miramichi, New Brunswick, Canada to Larne, County Antrim.
Maria	United Kingdom	The steamship ran aground at Pasaja, Spain. She was on a voyage from Liverpool to Pasaja.
May Queen	United Kingdom	The full-rigged ship was driven ashore at Tauranga, New Zealand. She was refloated.
Milton	United Kingdom	The ship caught fire at Christmas and was abandoned in the Pacific Ocean. Some of her crew were rescued by Cochin (Flag unknown) and were not heard of since. Five people rescued by a steamship off the coast of Lower California were believed to be from Milton.
Minna	Sweden	The schooner was driven ashore and wrecked at Lemvig, Denmark with the loss of four of her crew. She was on a voyage from Middlesbrough to Nevekvarn.
M. Luther	United States	The ship was wrecked at Cap-Haïtien, Haiti. She was on a voyage from Saint Thomas, Virgin Islands to Cap-Haïtien.
Moravian	United Kingdom	The steamship was wrecked on "Mud Island". All on board were rescued. She was on a voyage from Portland, Maine, United States to Halifax, Nova Scotia, Canada.
Norton	United Kingdom	The ship was abandoned in the Atlantic Ocean before 25 December.
Olive Branch	United Kingdom	The barque ran aground on the Longsand, in the North Sea off the coast of Essex. Her crew were rescued by the Harwich Lifeboat.
Oronsa	United Kingdom	The brigantine was driven ashore at Gibraltar. She was on a voyage from Smyrna, Ottoman Empire to Falmouth, Cornwall.
Pallas	Germany	The brig was driven ashore at Sanda, Gotland, Sweden. She was on a voyage from Kronstadt, Russia to Leith, Lothian, United Kingdom.
Pepina B.	Trieste	The ship was abandoned 160 nautical miles (300 km) south west of "Belli". Her crew were rescued by Maria (France). Pepina B. was on a voyage from Cardiff, Glamorgan to Oran, Algeria.
Pilot	United Kingdom	The paddle steamer was wrecked off the mouth of the River Ogmore.
Polly	United Kingdom	The barque was wrecked in the Bay of Honduras.
Prometheus	United Kingdom	The ship was driven ashore at Rixhöft, Germany. She was on a voyage from Newcastle upon Tyne, Northumberland to Danzig. She was consequently condemned.
Rainbow	United Kingdom	The ketch ran aground off the Isle of Grain, Kent.
Reaper	United Kingdom	The ship was driven ashore at Saltfleet, Lincolnshire. She was refloated.
Renown	United Kingdom	The smack ran aground on the Chichester Bank. Her crew survived.
Rio	(United Kingdom of Great Britain and Ireland) Guernsey	The schooner was driven ashore at Saint-Jean-de-Monts, Vendée, France.
Rochdale	United Kingdom	The steamship was driven ashore and wrecked at Indian Harbour, Nova Scotia.
Rosito	Spain	The barque was lost at Bilbao. Her crew were rescued.
Royal Artilleryman	United Kingdom	The ship was driven ashore at Saltfleet and sank.
Royal Blue Jacket	(United Kingdom of Great Britain and Ireland) Jersey	The schooner was abandoned in the Atlantic Ocean.
Seltia	United Kingdom	The steamship was abandoned by eight of her crew 8 nautical miles (15 km) off Southport, Lancashire. She was on a voyage from Barrow-in-Furness to Liverpool.
Sophia	United Kingdom	The steamship sank off the Cockleshell Hard.
Springbok	United Kingdom	The schooner was driven ashore and wrecked at Portachen Point. She was on a voyage from Belfast, County Antrim to Ayr.
Stratheyre	United Kingdom	The steamship was driven ashore at Seascale, Cumberland. Her crew were rescued.
Tawe	United Kingdom	The ship was lost at sea. Her crew were rescued by Arethusa (United Kingdom) Tawe was on a voyage from Port Nolloth, Cape Colony to Swansea.
Thetis	Norway	The barque was abandoned in the North Sea. She was taken in to Flekkefjord in a waterlogged condition on 1 January 1882.
Tiger	Germany	The barque was driven ashore at Cape Arkona. She was on a voyage from Hull to Stettin. She was refloated with the assistance of a steamship and taken in to Swinemünde.
Tonsberg	Norway	The barque was abandoned in the Atlantic Ocean on or before 2 December.
Trenton	Norway	The ship was abandoned in the Atlantic Ocean before 5 December. She was on a voyage from Quebec City to London.
Valero	United Kingdom	The brig was driven ashore at Brunswick, Georgia, United States. She was refloated and taken in to Brunswick.
Varberg	Norway	The brig was abandoned in the Atlantic Ocean before 13 December. Her crew were rescued. She was on a voyage from Saint John, New Brunswick to Palma de Majorca, Spain.
Verdi	United Kingdom	The steamship was driven ashore at Southerndown, Glamorgan. She was on a voyage from Bilbao, Spain to Newport, Monmouthshire.
Walkyre	Germany	The barque was wrecked on the Karangkaca Reef. Her crew survived. She was on a voyage from New York to Hong Kong.
21st Mayon	Chile	The barque struck a rock and was wrecked. She was on a voyage from Valparaíso to Port Townsend, Washington, United States.
Unnamed	Flag unknown	The ship, a brigantine or a schooner, was run down and sunk in the Atlantic Ocean by the steamship Bendigo (United Kingdom).
Unnamed	United Kingdom	The schooner was driven ashore at Point St. Quentin, Somme.
