= Louisiana State Police =

U.S. state law enforcement agency

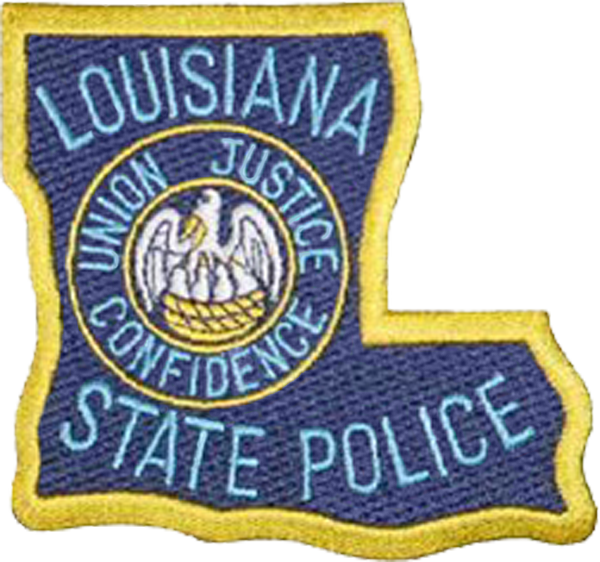
- Patch of Louisiana State Police

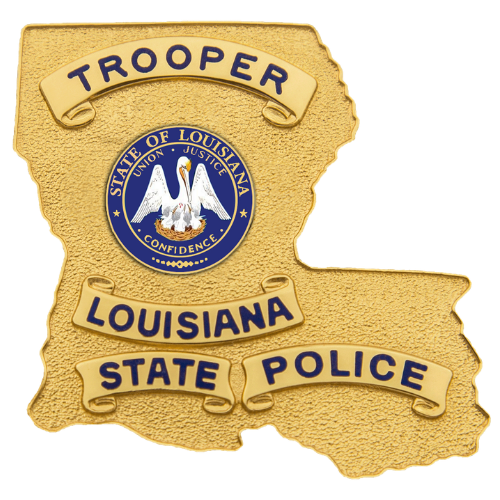
- Badge of Louisiana State Police
- Abbreviation: LSP
- Motto: "Courtesy, Loyalty, Service!"

Agency overview
- Formed: 1922; 104 years ago
- Preceding agency: Louisiana Highway Commission
- Employees: 1,533 (as of 2026)

Jurisdictional structure
- Operations jurisdiction: Louisiana, US
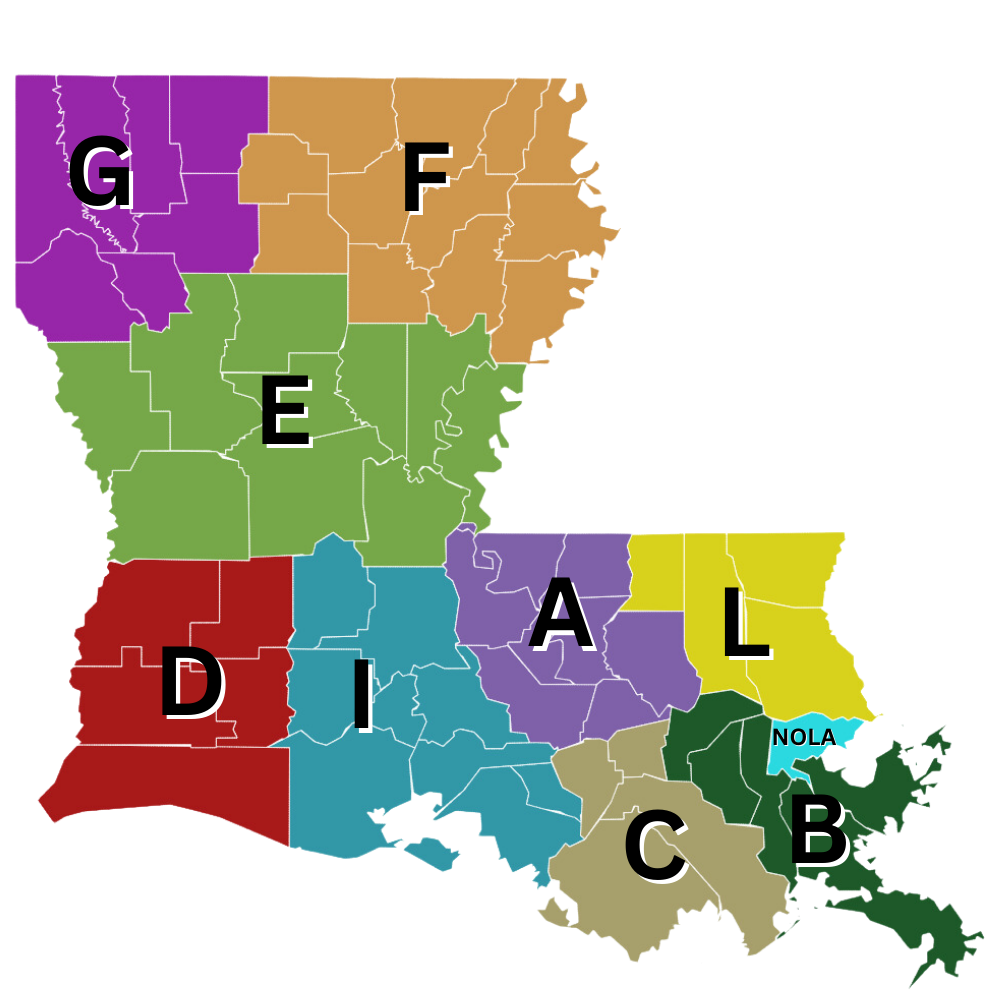
- LSP Troop Map
- Area: 51,885 square miles (134,380 km^{2})
- Population: 4,518,189
- Legal jurisdiction: (Louisiana) Statewide
- General nature: Civilian police

Operational structure
- Headquarters: Baton Rouge, Louisiana
- Troopers: 1,138 (as of 2026)
- Civilians: 580 (as of 2026)
- Agency executive: Colonel Frank J. Besson, Superintendent
- Parent agency: Louisiana Department of Public Safety & Corrections

Facilities
- Troops: 10 Troops

Website
- lsp.org

The Louisiana State Police (French: Police d’Etat de Louisiane) is the state police agency of Louisiana, which has jurisdiction anywhere in the state, headquartered in Baton Rouge. It falls under the authority of the Louisiana Department of Public Safety & Corrections. It is officially known in that organization as the Office of State Police.

The Louisiana State Police is a premier law enforcement agency in Louisiana and was accredited by the Commission on Accreditation for Law Enforcement Agencies (CALEA) from 2003 to 2008. The agency voluntarily ceased its association with CALEA in 2008.

== History ==
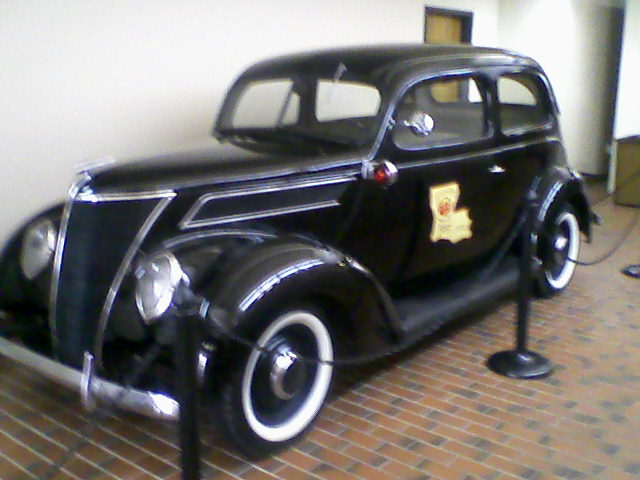
1937 Ford - Louisiana State Police Patrol Car

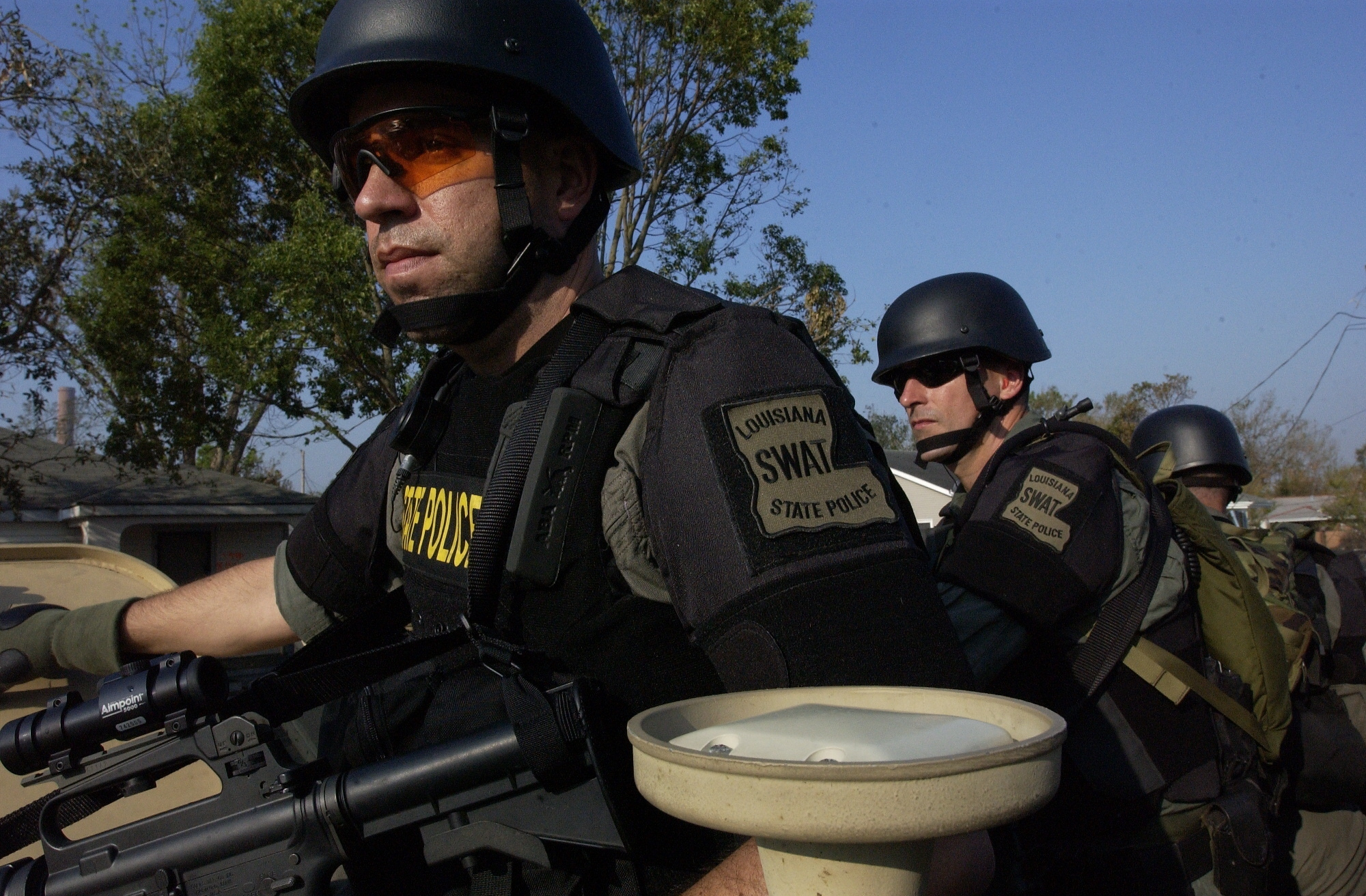
LSP SWAT on patrol in the aftermath of Hurricane Katrina in September 2005

The organization began in 1922 as the Louisiana Highway Commission with 16 Highway Inspectors covering approximately 2,700 miles (4,300 km) of roadway. These inspectors patrolled exclusively by motorcycles. These motorcycles were personally owned by the individual patrolmen, and maintained by an allowance from the state. Of the 16 men on the force, one was a captain. This captain served as superintendent of the force. The highway commission was divided into ten districts. The Baton Rouge District had two patrol officers, while the New Orleans District had three patrolmen. The other eight districts had one patrol officer each. The other two officers patrolled statewide on the main highways of the state. In 1928 the agency was known as the Law Enforcement Division of the Highway Commission, and employed 70 uniformed officers. The Bureau of Criminal Investigation was also formed about that time. In 1932, the organization's name was changed to the State Highway Patrol, and it was given the authority to carry firearms. The agency was used by Governor Huey Long as his personal bodyguards, who escorted him across the state. In 1936, the two divisions of law enforcement were combined, by an act of the Louisiana Legislature, to form the Louisiana Department of State Police. The department's force of patrolmen numbered over 40 at that time, and the primary patrol vehicle was the motorcycle. In 1939, the State Police was divided into eight "troops". Troopers in cars and motorcycles were patrolling nearly 2 million miles per year throughout the state. The agency's fleet of patrol motorcycles eventually grew to 64 motorcycles. In 1942 the Louisiana Legislature abolished the Department of State Police and made it a division of the newly created Department of Public Safety. The state police accepted new responsibilities in 1946, when the state's Drivers License Law was enacted requiring every driver to hold a license for operating a motor vehicle. Prior to this time, only the operators of commercial vehicles, trucks, and buses were required to be licensed in Louisiana. In 1948, the number of motorcycles operated by the agency had fallen to 36 motorcycles. The department was relying more heavily on automobiles for patrol purposes, and eventually patrol motorcycles were only found in New Orleans and other major cities. Motorcycle patrol units were used throughout the 1950s, with Governor Earl Kemp Long also using them as bodyguards. In the 1960s, the department was utilizing motorcycles, automobiles, airplanes, and helicopters for enforcement purposes. The department had exclusively used Harley-Davidson motorcycles until the 1980s when it switched to Kawasaki motorcycles. A short time after this switch, the motorcycle patrol program was disbanded. In 1997, patrol motorcycles were brought back on the force.

In July 2018, Trooper, Kasha Domingue shot a male passenger in the back who was unarmed at a 2018 traffic stop behind a Perkins Road store causing a severe injury to his spinal cord. A grand jury indicted Trooper Kasha Domingue, 43 of Baton Rouge on Thursday, Oct. 1, 2020 on charges of aggravated second-degree battery and illegal use of a weapon in the shooting of Clifton Dilley, a Baton Rouge man who was 19 at the time. The indictment marked the first time in District Attorney Hillar Moore III's 11-plus years as prosecutor that an officer was charged with a crime after killing or injuring a civilian with gunfire.

In September 2018, the Louisiana State Police were scrutinized for using lists of personal information about supposed Antifa members which were posted on 8chan's politics board. The file "antifa.docx" was found in police databases and led directly to the opening of criminal investigations.

In 2019 a Louisiana State Police unit stunned, punched, dragged and ultimately killed Ronald Greene, a Black motorist who had failed to pull over for an unspecified traffic violation. A federal civil rights investigation was conducted and the state set up a panel to investigate several incidents of misconduct, including filing of false reports. In 2021, the ACLU called for a federal investigation into the Louisiana State Police. State Police brass initially argued the troopers’ use of force was justified — “awful but lawful,” as ranking officials described it — and did not open an administrative investigation until 474 days after Greene's death. Police body camera footage had surfaced and there was evidence that Green likely did not die as a result of a crash, following a high speed chase, as Green's family had been told. The FBI opened an investigation

On June 9, 2022, the U.S. Department of Justice Civil Rights Division, Special Litigation Section opened a joint investigation with the U.S. Attorney's Offices for the Eastern, Middle, and Western Districts of Louisiana, against the State of Louisiana and the Louisiana State Police. The investigation is separate from any federal criminal investigation, as a Pattern-or-Practice investigation, also referred to as "Pattern or Practice of conduct", or Pattern or Practice of Discrimination under the authority of the Violent Crime Control and Law Enforcement Act of 1994, pursuant to 42 U.S.C.§ 14141, since migrated to 34 U.S.C. § 12601.

A Union Parish grand jury indicted four Louisiana State Police (LSP) troopers and one Union Parish deputy, with charges ranging from negligent homicide, malfeasance in office, and obstruction of justice. Trooper Chris Hollingsworth died in a car crash in September 2020, according to the Ouachita Parish Coroner's Office. Governor Jeff Landry has promised sweeping reforms. He tapped Major Robert Hodges (28 year LSP veteran) as the new LSP superintendent per recommendations of his criminal justice advisory council. Liz Murrill, newly appointed as Attorney General, intends to hire former federal prosecutor Ed O’Callaghan to perform an internal study of the Louisiana State Police. A goal to "...assist in restoring the rule of law to this city and provide victims the justice they deserve", according to Governor Landry.

== Patrol areas ==
The department is divided into nine troops, with its headquarters in Baton Rouge. The troops are divided as follows:

- Troop A (Baton Rouge): covers the following 9 parishes: Ascension, East Baton Rouge, East Feliciana, Iberville, Livingston, St. James (east bank), Pointe Coupee, West Baton Rouge, West Feliciana
- Troop B (Kenner): covers 5 parishes: St. Charles, St. John (east bank), Plaquemines, St. Bernard, Jefferson
- Troop C (Houma): covers the 5 parishes of Assumption, Lafourche, Terrebonne, and the west banks of St. James and St. John
- Troop D (Lake Charles): covers the 5 parishes of Allen, Beauregard, Calcasieu, Cameron and Jefferson Davis
- Troop E (Alexandria): covers the parishes of Avoyelles, Catahoula, Concordia, Grant, LaSalle, Natchitoches, Rapides, Sabine, Vernon and Winn
- Troop F (Monroe): covers the Parishes of Union, West Carroll, East Carroll, Morehouse, Lincoln, Ouachita, Richland, Madison, Jackson, Caldwell, Tensas, and Franklin.
- Troop G (Bossier City): covers the Parishes of Caddo, Bossier, De Soto, Webster, Claiborne, Bienville, and Red River.
- Troop I (Lafayette): covers Parishes of Evangeline, St. Landry, Acadia, Lafayette, St. Martin, Vermilion, Iberia, and St. Mary.
- Troop L (Covington): covers the parishes of St. Helena, St. Tammany, Tangipahoa and Washington
- Troop NOLA (New Orleans): covers 1 parish: Orleans and the City of New Orleans.

== Disbanded troops ==
The following troops are no longer in existence:

- Troop H (Leesville) comprised Vernon, as the home base parish, and Sabine and Beauregard Parishes. It was disbanded in 1988 due to budget considerations.
- Troop K (Opelousas) included Avoyelles, Evangeline, Pointe Coupee, and St. Landry Parishes. It was disbanded in 1988 due to budget considerations.
- Troop M (Des Allemands) closed in 1973 when merged into the current Troop C. It comprised Lafourche, Terrebonne, Assumption, the West banks of St. Charles, St. John, and St. James Parishes.
- Troop N (Crowley) included Acadia and Vermilion parishes. Disbanded in 1969.
- Troop N (New Orleans): centered in and around the French Quarter of New Orleans. Although initially not officially classified as a Troop, Troop N was reopened in New Orleans, in 2005, as headquarters for post-Hurricane Katrina operations until April 2006. It was again reopened in April, 2015, to oversee deployments of temporary extra troopers to the New Orleans French Quarter detail. In late 2016, it was officially designated a Troop. Due to issues with funding and the COVID-19 global pandemic, Troop N was again disbanded on December 31, 2020.
- Troop O (Delhi) comprised Franklin, Richland, Tensas, Madison, East and West Carroll Parishes. Troop O was created in 1968. It operated from the city hall building in Delhi, Louisiana. It was very short lived, lasting a mere 13 months before being disbanded in 1969 and its parishes returned to Troop F.

== Rank structure ==
| Rank | Insignia | Description |
|---|---|---|
| Colonel | | One individual is appointed (by the Governor) as the Deputy Secretary of the Department of Public Safety and Superintendent of the State Police and holds the rank of Colonel. The Colonel wears one silver-colored eagle on each epaulet. |
| Lieutenant Colonel | | There are six officers with the rank of Lieutenant Colonel, each overseeing one of the bureaus within the State Police. Lieutenant Colonels wear a silver-colored oak leaf on each epaulet. |
| Major Emergency Services Command Technician Command Pilot | | Majors are responsible for a command within the State Police. Majors wear one gold-colored oak leaf on each epaulet. The rank of Emergency Services Command Technician is at the same pay grade as Major. It is held by one officer who exercises command authority over the Emergency Services section. This officer wears two gold-colored bars on each epaulet. The rank of Command Pilot is also at the same pay grade as Major. It is held by one officer who exercises command authority over the Air Support section. This officer wears two gold-colored bars on each epaulet. |
| Captain Emergency Services Deputy Command Technician Master Pilot | | The specific responsibilities of a Captain vary depending upon where they are assigned within the Agency. For example, a Captain may be a Troop Commander in the Patrol Bureau or a Division Commander in one of the other Bureaus. Captains wear two gold-colored bars on each epaulet. Emergency Services Deputy Command Technicians assist in overseeing the Emergency Services section. They hold the same pay grade as a captain, and exercise supervisory authority over lower ranking Emergency Services Technicians. These officers wear a gold-colored metal bar on each epaulet. Master Pilots hold the same paygrade as an Emergency Services Deputy Command Technician. Master Pilots, however, do not exercise any supervisory authority or responsibility. They operate the department's aircraft within the Air Support section. These officers wear a gold-colored metal bar that is inlaid with three blue enamel bars on each epaulet. |
| Emergency Services Technician Supervisor Technical Support Officer Supervisor Senior Pilot | | Emergency Services Technician Supervisors hold a pay grade that is below Captain, and above Lieutenant. They work within the Emergency Services section, and exercise supervisory authority over lower ranking Emergency Services Technicians. These officers wear three yellow inverted chevrons on each sleeve. Technical Support Officer Supervisors also hold the same pay grade as Emergency Services Technician Supervisors. They exercise supervisory authority over lower ranking Technical Support Officers. These officers wear a gold-colored metal bar that is inlaid with three blue enamel bars on each epaulet. Senior Pilots hold the same paygrade as an Emergency Services Technician Supervisor. Senior Pilots, however, do not exercise any supervisory authority or responsibility. They operate the department's aircraft within the Air Support section. These officers wear a gold-colored metal bar that is inlaid with two blue enamel bars on each epaulet. |
| Lieutenant Emergency Services Senior Technician Technical Support Senior Officer *Polygraphist; *Pilot | | The responsibilities of a lieutenant vary within the department. At the Troop level, a lieutenant is typically the commander of a shift. Other Lieutenants in other divisions may command a unit. Lieutenants wear gold-colored metal bars on each epaulet. Emergency Services Senior Technicians hold the same pay grade as a Lieutenant, but they do not hold any supervisory authority or responsibility. They work in the Emergency Services section. These officers wear a gold-colored metal bar that is inlaid with two blue enamel bars on each epaulet. Technical Support Senior Officers work within the Technical Support section. These officers wear a gold-colored metal bar that is inlaid with two blue enamel bars on each epaulet. Polygraphists and Pilots also hold the same pay grade as a Lieutenant. Like Emergency Services Senior Technicians, they do not hold the same authority as a Lieutenant. Polygraphists work primarily in the department's Internal Affairs section, and conduct polygraph based investigations. Pilots operate the department's aircraft as part of the Air Support section. |
| Sergeant *Emergency Services Technician; *Technical Support Officer | | Sergeants act as assistant shift commanders or duty officers. A sergeant is generally considered to be a first-line supervisor in most units. Sergeants wear three yellow inverted chevrons on each sleeve under the State Police patch. Emergency Services Technicians and Technical Support Officers hold the same pay grade as a Sergeant, but they do not hold any supervisory authority or responsibility. They work in the Emergency Services and Technical Support sections, respectively. These officers wear a gold-colored metal bar that is inlaid with a single blue enamel bar on each epaulet. |
| Master Trooper | | The insignia for this rank consists of a gold-colored 'MT' collar pin worn on the wearer's right lapel. Troopers who complete fifteen (15) years of satisfactory or exceptional service are promoted to the rank of Master Trooper. While not considered a first-line supervisor, Master Troopers are occasionally tasked to exercise supervision over other lower-ranking Troopers |
| Senior Trooper | | The insignia for this rank consists of a gold-colored 'ST' collar pin worn on the wearer's right lapel. Troopers who complete ten (10) years of satisfactory or exceptional service are promoted to the rank of Senior Trooper. |
| Trooper First Class | | The insignia for this rank consists of a gold-colored 'TFC' collar pin worn on the wearer's right lapel. Troopers who complete five (5) years of satisfactory or exceptional service are promoted to the rank of Trooper First Class. |
| Trooper | | The insignia for this rank consists of a gold-colored 'TPR' collar pin worn on the wearer's right lapel. This rank is attained by Cadets upon successful completion of the training academy. |
| Cadet | | A Cadet is a raw recruit, and is the rank held by all personnel while assigned as a student at the training academy. These personnel do not wear rank insignia. |

== Equipment ==
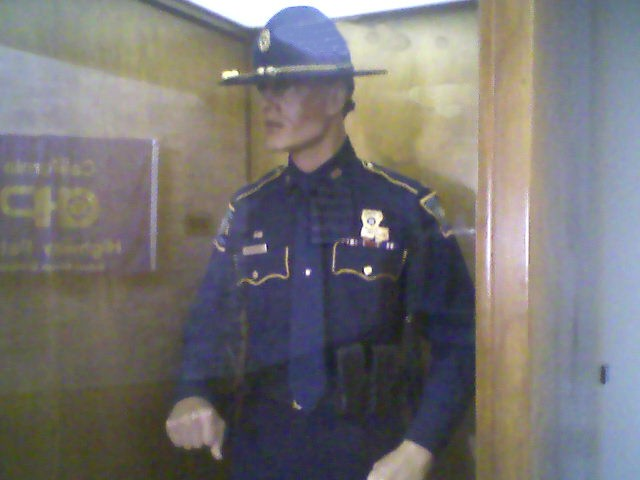
Example Louisiana State Trooper Uniform

=== Firearms ===
The current standard issue firearm for LSP Troopers is the Glock 17 in caliber 9mm or Glock 22 in caliber .40 S&W. Previously, the standard issue sidearm was the SIG Sauer P220 semi-automatic pistol in caliber .45 ACP. Other optional handguns are also authorized for carry on-duty. Each trooper is also issued a Remington 870 Police 12 gauge magnum shotgun. Troopers are also issued a Colt AR-15 or Bushmaster M4-type Carbine in .223, a Ruger Mini-14 in .223, or an H&K MP5 in 9mm. The troopers in this agency have been issued batons and pepper spray for quite some time. Tasers have also been introduced, and have been in service since 2005.

=== Patrol cars ===
The current primary Louisiana State Police patrol vehicle is the Chevrolet Tahoe. The agency began a conversion to the Tahoe in 2012. Previously, the agency used the Ford Crown Victoria "Police Interceptor." This vehicle was the main patrol vehicle used by the agency from 1997 to 2011, when it replaced the Chevrolet Caprice in 1996, and when the Crown Victoria was discontinued in 2011. The vehicle's markings include "State Trooper" written on each front quarter panel, a state badge on the center of each front door, the words "Louisiana State Police" written above and below the door badge, and the words "State Police" written on the trunk. Note that the markings on the Tahoe include a slight variation to the previously used designs. In 2012 all markings were re-designed. The door badge has been redesigned from a light blue to a darker blue. Also the badge state seal in center was updated to reflect a 2008 change showing a more angular "Pelican in Her Piety" state seal done in white. It is completely different from the prior one used from 1964 to 2012 except in dimension. The red "LSP" lettering was also upgraded to a more reflective prismatic shade of ruby red, and each letter now has a small dark blue border around it. An "ACE" insignia, consisting of a blue State of Louisiana with a red lightning bolt, is awarded to troopers who recover five or more stolen vehicles within a year. Since approximately 2001, a majority of the marked patrol vehicles utilized by this agency have been equipped with onboard video cameras. Other 'marked' patrol vehicles currently used include Harley-Davidson motorcycles, the Chevrolet Camaro, the Chevrolet Tahoe and Suburban, with incidental examples fielded since 2013 of the Ford Taurus Interceptor, Ford Explorer Police and Caprice PPV. Announced on January 31, 2018, beginning in the succeeding month [February], newer models of the Dodge Charger were introduced. The latter included "less visible, semi-marked and unmarked" vehicles to "[...]combat aggressive, impaired, and distracted driving."

=== Gallery of Patrol Units ===
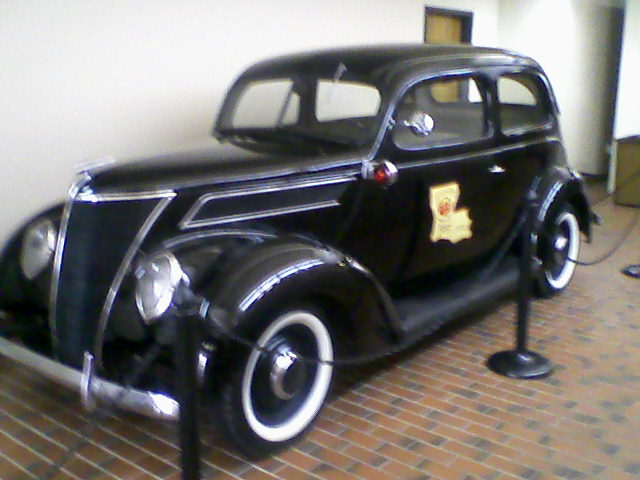

== Special units ==
Like many other state police agencies around the United States, the Louisiana State Police has several sub-divisions specializing in addressing particular crimes or security needs. These include a Bomb Squad, an Air Support Unit, a Special Weapons And Tactics (SWAT) Team, an Executive Protection detail that functions under the Louisiana Department of Public Safety Police (for protection of the Louisiana Governor, Lt. Governor, other dignitaries, Capitol grounds, and other state owned facilities), a Motor Carrier Safety Enforcement (MCSAP) section, and a Hazardous Materials Response Unit.

The Criminal Investigations Division includes a Statewide Narcotics Task Force, a Concealed Handgun Permit Section, an Auto Theft Recovery Unit, the Casino Gaming & Licensing Section, a Criminal Intelligence Unit, Identity Theft Investigations, an Insurance Fraud Investigations Section, and a cyber crimes section which specializes in online and computer crimes.

The agency also operates the State Police Crime Laboratory.

The agency previously ran a section called the Anti-Terrorist Assistance Program (ATAP) which was a joint venture with the U.S. State Department. This ATAP section trained foreign police and military forces in detecting, preventing, and fighting of terrorism.

== Fallen officers ==
Since its formation in 1922, 29 LSP troopers have been killed in the line of duty. The most common cause of line of duty deaths to date is automobile accidents.

| Rank | Name | Date of death | Cause of death |
|---|---|---|---|
| Officer | Neill A. Yarborough Sr. | 02-25-1925 | Shot and killed while he and other officers attempted to arrest a fugitive. |
| Patrolman | Geronimo C. Trevino | 08-08-1932 | Struck by drunk driver while speaking to a motorist on the side of the road. |
| Patrolman | Alonzo Patrick O'Bryan | 10-04-1933 | Succumbed to injuries sustained on 10-02-1933 when he rear-ended a vehicle while on his motorcycle. |
| Patrolman | Frank J. David Sr. | 10-09-1933 | Struck and killed by a vehicle he was attempting to stop. |
| Patrolman | Victor A. Mossy | 05-13-1936 | Struck and killed by a tractor trailer while on his motorcycle. |
| Trooper | James T. Brownfield | 05-09-1943 | Struck a stray cow in the road on 05-08-1943 and succumbed to his injuries the following day. |
| Trooper | Ulis Floyd | 02-24-1952 | Shot and killed at his house after stopping 2 men earlier that day for reckless driving; they also killed his son. |
| Trooper | Wilmer L. Moody | 11-10-1956 | Killed in a car crash as a passenger while en route to a call; a truck pulled out in front of them, causing the patrol car to swerve into opposite lanes and be hit head-on. |
| Trooper | James N. Pollard | 11-20-1956 | Struck and killed while trying to get a vehicle out of a ditch. |
| Sergeant | Eli L. Smith | 01-17-1957 | Succumbed to injuries sustained the previous year on 01–29–1956; he was run off the road during a pursuit by the suspect causing lasting injuries. |
| Trooper | Francis C. Zinna | 03-24-1958 | Struck and killed by a speeding vehicle while manning a roadblock. |
| Trooper | Rudolph H. Miller | 11-08-1962 | Struck and killed by a vehicle while on a traffic stop. |
| Lieutenant | Joseph D. Ferris | 02-23-1968 | Killed after losing control of his car on the icy roadway. |
| Trooper | Huey P. Grace | 10-30-1968 | Killed in a pursuit of 3 drag racers after crashing with one of them. |
| Trooper | Lamon Weaver | 04-17-1973 | Killed in a car crash after turning around to pull a car over; unknown whether he lost control or was forced off the road. |
| Trooper | William C. Warrington | 07-17-1973 | Killed in a car crash after attempting to pass a car and losing control. |
| Sergeant | Clarence J. Miller Jr. | 12-04-1975 | Killed 12 minutes before his shift ended after picking up a suspect to take to jail; hit head-on by a car traveling in the wrong lanes. |
| Trooper | Donald Charles Cleveland | 07-02-1977 | Shot and killed during a traffic stop by a newly released prisoner who had just gotten out of prison for a murder committed as a juvenile. |
| Trooper | Jean Claude Crescionne | 04-20-1982 | Killed after a truck pulled out in front of him. |
| Trooper | Damon L. Robichaux | 07-21-1982 | Shot and killed when he dropped his revolver and it discharged, hitting him in the chest; he had just been recalled to duty for an escort and was walking out of his house. |
| Trooper | William Michael "Mike" Kess | 02-05-1983 | Killed after he lost control in a curve during a 20-mile pursuit. |
| Master Trooper | Stephen H. Gray | 05-29-1995 | Killed while responding to a car crash when his car lost control in the rain went over the center line and was broadsided by a truck. |
| Sergeant | George Douglas "Doug" Johnston | 11-17-1997 | Killed after losing control in a curve and hitting a ditch and several trees. |
| Trooper | Hung Nguyen Le | 06-30-1998 | Succumbed to injuries sustained on 05–19–1998; Trooper Le was slowing traffic for construction crews when he was rear-ended at a high speed and over 70% of his body was burned. |
| Trooper | Duane Allen Dalton | 01-12-2010 | Killed after being hit in an intersection by a driver who ran a stop sign. |
| Corporal | John Ray Kendall | 08-09-2011 | Killed in a car crash after his car crossed the median and hit a tractor trailer head-on. |
| Senior Trooper | Steven J. Vincent | 08-24-2015 | Shot and killed after trying to help an intoxicated driver out of a ditch; the suspect fired from a close range with a sawed off shotgun, hitting Vincent in the head. |
| Trooper | George Baker | 05-24-2020 | Succumbed to injuries sustained after being struck by a Hammond Police car while assisting in a high speed chase. |
| Master Trooper | Adam Gaubert | 10-09-2021 | Shot and killed in an ambush. |

== Oversight ==
=== State Police Commission ===
The Louisiana State Police Commission is tasked with oversight for State Police. The civilian board creates rules to regulate state police personnel activities including hiring, firing, and reinstatements. Since the 2019 death of Ronald Green the Louisiana State Police and Police Commission has been under scrutiny. According to a Louisiana Legislative Auditor's report, the commission as an external authority, does not currently get involved in State Police affairs and internal investigations.

The Louisiana State Legislature, Committee on Senate and Governmental Affairs, proposed a Constitutional amendment requiring Senate confirmation for appointed and non-elected members of the State Police Commission. The bill, co-sponsored by Louisiana Senator Cleo Fields and was placed on the ballot, as Louisiana Amendment 3 to the Louisiana State Constitution, and was approved on December 10, 2022.

=== Internal Affairs ===
Authority to investigate complaints against any employee of the Department of Public Safety is under the Office of Internal Affairs. Created by the LSP in 1972, the office also performs background checks of the Governor's appointees, employees of other agencies, and coordinates the activities of the promotion board.

== In popular culture ==
- The first season of HBO's True Detective depicted Matthew McConaughey and Woody Harrelson as Louisiana State Police detectives.
- James Bond is pursued by several Louisiana State Police patrol cars in the 1973 spy film Live and Let Die.

== See also ==
- Louisiana State Troopers Association
- Louisiana Department of Wildlife & Fisheries - Enforcement Division
- List of law enforcement agencies in Louisiana
- State police
- State patrol
- Highway patrol
- Mike Edmonson
- Joseph S. Cage Jr.
