= Killing of Ronald Greene =

2019 death of an unarmed African-American man near Monroe, Louisiana, U.S.

- Date: May 10, 2019; 7 years ago
- Location: Louisiana, U.S.
- Type: Homicide
- Participants: Louisiana State Police officers
- Deaths: 1 (Ronald Hardin Greene)

On May 10, 2019, Ronald Hardin Greene, an unarmed 49-year-old Black man, was killed after being arrested by Louisiana State Police following a high-speed chase outside Monroe, Louisiana. During the arrest, he was stunned, punched, pepper sprayed and placed in a chokehold. He was also dragged face down while handcuffed and shackled, and he was left face down for at least nine minutes. At least six white troopers were involved in the arrest; five were criminally charged in December 2022.

When Greene's corpse was brought to the hospital, police told doctors that his car had run into a tree, a story a doctor said "does not add up", given the nature of Greene's injuries and the fact that there were two stun-gun probes lodged in his body; police later acknowledged that Greene had died during a struggle, but did not mention specifics about any use of force by officers. Although authorities refused to release body camera footage for two years, the Associated Press obtained and published a portion of it in May 2021. In 2022, a medical examiner ruled the death a homicide.

One trooper involved in the killing, Dakota DeMoss, was given letters of reprimand and counseling for violating the department's rules about courtesy and recordings. DeMoss was later arrested for using excessive force while handcuffing a motorist in a separate incident; he was subsequently fired in June 2021. A second trooper, Chris Hollingsworth, died in a single-vehicle car accident in September 2020, hours after learning he would be fired for his role in Greene's killing. A third trooper, Kory York, was suspended for 50 hours for dragging Greene and improperly turning off his body camera, and has since returned to duty. As of May 2021, a federal wrongful death lawsuit and a federal civil rights investigation remain pending. In December 2022, five officers, including four state troopers and a Union Parish sheriff's deputy, were charged with crimes related to Greene's killing. Master Trooper Kory York was charged with negligent homicide and ten counts of malfeasance in office, while other officers were charged with malfeasance and obstruction of justice.

== Killing ==
External videos
- Clip of police bodycam footage

Shortly after midnight on May 10, 2019, State Trooper Dakota DeMoss attempted to pull over Ronald Greene, a 49-year-old African-American barber, for an unspecified traffic violation near Monroe, Louisiana. Greene did not stop, and troopers chased him on rural highways at over 115 mph (185 km/h). During the chase, DeMoss radioed that "We got to do something. He's going to kill somebody."

When Greene finally did stop, DeMoss and Master Trooper Chris Hollingsworth rushed to Greene's vehicle as Greene said repeatedly, "OK, OK. I'm sorry" and appeared to raise his hands. Within seconds, Hollingsworth shot Greene with a stun gun through the driver's window while commanding Greene to get out of the car.

After Greene, who was unarmed, got out through the car's passenger side, one trooper wrestled him to the ground, put him in a chokehold, and punched him in the face. Hollingsworth struck Greene multiple times. While they tried to handcuff Greene, one of the troopers said "He's grabbing me", and another said "Put your hands behind your back, bitch." Greene cried "I'm sorry!" and "I'm your brother! I'm scared!" Another trooper stunned Greene a second time, and said he would shoot again "if you don't put your fucking hands behind your back".

After handcuffing Greene and shackling his legs, Trooper Kory York dragged Greene facedown along the ground. Before York dragged Greene, Greene had tried to prop himself up on his side, leading York to shout at Greene: "Don't you turn over! Lay on your belly!" After dragging Greene, York told him: "You better lay on your fucking belly like I told you to! You understand?"

Instead of rendering aid, the troopers left Greene unattended, facedown and moaning, for at least nine minutes while they cleaned blood off themselves with sanitizer wipes. One trooper said, "I hope this guy ain't got fucking AIDS." Another trooper referred to Greene as a "stupid motherfucker".

At some point during the arrest, the troopers said that they did not want to have Greene sit up because they feared he would spit blood on them, to which Lieutenant John Clary told them not to sit Greene up. At another point, according to an investigator's report filed around early April 2021, "Greene's eyes are squeezed shut as he shakes his head back and forth moaning in pain, movements consistent with having been sprayed in the face with (pepper) spray", and about this time an officer "asked Greene if he has his attention now" and another said, "Yeah, that shit hurts, doesn’t it?"

After several minutes, Greene, unresponsive and bleeding from the head, was put in an ambulance, handcuffed to the stretcher. He was dead on arrival at the hospital.

== Cause of death and false statements by police ==
A 2021 medical report stated Greene was bruised, bloodied, and had two stun-gun prongs in his back; the emergency room physician wrote that the troopers' initial claim that Greene had been killed in a collision with a tree "does not add up." An autopsy commissioned by Greene's family found severe injuries to his head and several wounds to his face.

Authorities repeatedly refused to release body camera footage, or details about Greene's death, for two years. Troopers initially told Greene's family that he died by crashing into a tree. Later, troopers released a statement that said Greene "became unresponsive" and died on his way to the hospital after a struggle with the troopers. The troopers' report made no mention of use of force by the troopers.

In 2020, the Union Parish Coroner's office told the Associated Press that Greene's death was attributed to cardiac arrest and ruled accidental. The coroner's file attributed Greene's death to a car crash and does not mention a struggle with police. The full coroner's report, released in 2021, indicated that Greene had high blood levels of cocaine and alcohol, but also had a fractured breastbone and a ruptured aorta.

On the day of Greene's killing, the highest-ranked officer at the arrest, Lieutenant John Clary, falsely told investigators that he had no body camera video of the arrest. In fact, Clary's body camera recorded 30 minutes of footage of the arrest. According to state police documents, during the arrest, Clary "immediately" switched off his body camera when another trooper indicated that it was recording. Clary also falsely told investigators that Greene had been "still resisting, even though he was handcuffed. He was still trying to get away and was not cooperating"; this was contradicted by Clary's own body camera footage, according to state police documents. A third false statement from Clary to investigators was his claim that troopers sat Greene up and "immediately held his head up so he could get a clear airway".

In 2022, a medical examiner hired by a legislative panel investigating Greene's death determined his death was a homicide for the first time.

== Lawsuit, investigation, and resistance to charges against officers ==
Greene's family filed a federal wrongful death lawsuit against the state police in May 2020, which remains pending as of July 2021. The family released graphic images of Greene's injuries, and images of Greene's car showing minor damage; the images were circulated online in September 2020.

Initially, the Louisiana State Police said the troopers' use of force was justified, describing it as "awful but lawful". State police did not open an administrative investigation until August 2020. A federal civil rights investigation into the killing was opened by September 2020.

The state police's internal investigation determined that Hollingsworth should be fired; in September 2020, hours after being informed that he would indeed be fired, he died in a single-car collision. In October 2020, the Associated Press published audio of Hollingsworth apparently telling a colleague that he had "beat the ever-living fuck out of" Greene and "choked him and everything else trying to get him under control", and that Greene "was spitting blood everywhere, and all of a sudden he just went limp."

The internal investigation also resulted in York being suspended without pay for 50 hours for dragging Greene and improperly turning off his body camera. York told investigators that he deactivated the device because it was beeping loudly and his "mind was on other things". After the suspension, York returned to duty, where he remains as of May 2021.

DeMoss received a "letter of counseling" and "letter of reprimand" for violating rules about courtesy and recording equipment in the arrest of Greene.

Clary was not disciplined by the department with regard to Greene's killing.

Greene's family was allowed in October 2020 to watch around 30 minutes of body-camera video of Greene's arrest. At this time, Greene's family also met with Louisiana Governor John Bel Edwards. The governor said that prosecutors did not allow the video to be released to the public, as investigations were still active.

DeMoss was arrested in February 2021 for using excessive force in a May 2020 arrest of another motorist. An internal investigation concluded that when the motorist had surrendered face-down on the ground, DeMoss attacked him with a knee strike and a slap, and then DeMoss turned off his own body camera. The investigation also determined that the motorist never resisted arrest, despite the troopers' report that he was resisting and trying to flee. The motorist's arrest "bears a strong resemblance" to Greene's, described the Associated Press. In late May 2021, the department made public their plans to fire DeMoss. In June 2021, DeMoss was fired.

The Federal Bureau of Investigation, the Justice Department Civil Rights Division, and the US Attorney for the Western District of Louisiana have opened a criminal investigation into Greene's killing. Marc Morial of the National Urban League and Judy Reese Morse of the Urban League of Louisiana sent a letter to the Justice Department, requesting that the investigation be broadened to examine the Louisiana State Police as a whole.

On June 30, 2021, the Lafayette Daily Advertiser reported that investigators from the Louisiana State Police were prevented from recommending prosecution of any of the involved officers by the senior state police leadership, including the superintendent, Col. Kevin Reeves, and Chief of Staff Bob Brown. Federal investigations were unaffected. Reeves was quoted by investigators as saying Greene's arrest was "awful but lawful."

An investigator also described an earlier May 17, 2019 meeting of investigators with department leaders including Monroe-based Troop F Commander John Peters that "became very heated," where they were told they would have "issues with patrol" if they arrested Hollingsworth for aggravated assault and for turning off his bodycam during the arrest.

On May 12, 2026, Louisiana officials entered into a settlement to pay $4.85 million to the Greene's family.

== Release of body camera footage ==
On May 18, 2021, the Associated Press obtained 46 minutes of body camera footage and released an edited clip. One trooper apparently deactivated the body camera's audio about halfway through the video. At least six troopers, who were white, were on the scene, but not all had their body cameras activated; some did not have their audio activated.

On July 7, 2021, the FBI ordered a re-examination of Greene's autopsy taking into account the body camera footage which had not been available during the first autopsy.

In July 2022, a local Louisiana district attorney received the federal case file and began reviewing their investigative reports.

== Criminal charges against officers ==
In December 2022 five officers were charged in relation with Greene's killing. Master Trooper Kory York was charged with negligent homicide and ten counts of malfeasance in office, while three other troopers and a sheriff's deputy were charged with malfeasance and obstruction of justice.

In January 2025, the FBI closed its investigation into Greene's killing, declining to bring charges.
