= Mike Edmonson =

American police superintendent

25th Louisiana State Police Superintendent
- In office January 2008 – March 24, 2017
- Preceded by: Stanley Griffin
- Succeeded by: Kevin Wayne Reeves

Personal details
- Born: Michael David Edmonson; September 19, 1958 (age 68) Alexandria, Louisiana, U.S.
- Party: Republican
- Spouse(s): (1) Helen Owens Achord (divorced) (2) Suzanne Maglone Edmonson
- Children: Brittney and Michael David Edmonson, Jr.
- Education: Holy Savior Menard Central High School; Louisiana State University; FBI National Academy
- Occupation: Law enforcement officer

Michael David Edmonson (born September 19, 1958) is the former superintendent of the Louisiana State Police, with service from January 2008 until March 24, 2017. To date, he is the longest serving of the Louisiana state police superintendents. Edmonson was appointed by Republican Governor Bobby Jindal. Jindal's successor, Democrat John Bel Edwards, who entered office on January 11, 2016, accepted Edmonson's letter of resignation in 2017, following a dispute regarding troopers mishandling their expense accounts while at a conference in San Diego, California.

== Background ==
Edmonson was a native of Alexandria, but attended Louisiana State University in Baton Rouge.

Edmonson was first married to Helen Owens, whom he divorced and married Suzanne Maglone Edmonson.

== Law-enforcement career ==
Prior to his appointment as LSP superintendent, Edmonson was highly recognizable due to his association with the LSU football team. He was the head of the security detail for coaches Mike Archer, Curley Hallman, Gerry DiNardo, Nick Saban and Les Miles prior to his appointment by Jindal.

In 2013 Edmonson received the Buford Pusser National Law Enforcement Award.

He also received the American Association of Motor Vehicle Administrators (AAMVA) Martha Irwin Award for Lifetime Achievement in Highway Safety.

== Controversies ==
After his retirement, it was revealed that Edmonson and his family had lived rent-free in an official residence for more than nine years, apparently without authorization. The benefit, valued at more than $400,000, may not have been reported to tax authorities. Other perks were also alleged, including chauffeuring of family and misuse of lodging in New Orleans during Mardi Gras.

== Retirement in 2017 ==
On March 22, 2017, Edwards appointed as Edmonson's interim (and later affirmed) successor Maj. Kevin Wayne Reeves, (born December 1968).

After he left the state police, Edmonson took a position in private industry.

| Preceded by Stanley Griffin | Superintendent of the Louisiana State Police; 2008–2017 | Succeeded by Kevin Wayne Reeves (interim) |
