= Alabama Landing, Louisiana =

Unincorporated community in Louisiana, U.S.

Coordinates: 32°52′25″N 92°05′04″W

Alabama Landing is an unincorporated community in Union Parish, Louisiana, United States.

== History ==
Alabama Landing was founded by settlers from Alabama near a landing on the Ouachita River.
