= John Garlington =

American football player (1946–2000)

No. 50
- Position: Linebacker

Personal information
- Born: June 5, 1946; Jonesboro, Louisiana, U.S.
- Died: February 10, 2000 (aged 53); Mill Creek, Louisiana, U.S.
- Listed height: 6 ft 1 in (1.85 m)
- Listed weight: 218 lb (99 kg)

Career information
- High school: Jonesboro-Hodge
- College: LSU
- NFL draft: 1968: 2nd round, 47th overall pick

Career history
- Cleveland Browns (1968–1977)

Awards and highlights
- First-team All-American (1967); 2× First-team All-SEC (1966, 1967)

Career NFL statistics
- Fumble recoveries: 8
- Interceptions: 9
- Sacks: 7
- Stats at Pro Football Reference

John Garlington
- Other name: Big John
- Police career
- Department: Louisiana Department of Wildlife & Fisheries - Enforcement Division
- Service years: 1986 - February 10, 2000
- Rank: 1986 - commissioned as Wildlife Agent; 1998 - promoted to Captain

John M. Garlington (June 5, 1946 – February 10, 2000) was an American professional football linebacker who played for the Cleveland Browns of the National Football League (NFL).

== Early life ==
Garlington was born in Jonesboro, Louisiana and graduated from Jonesboro-Hodge High School in Jonesboro. in 1964. He was a star college athlete at Louisiana State University. At LSU, he was a 1967 Kodak/American Football Coaches Association All-American pick. He was also a First-team All-SEC pick in 1966 by the Associated Press and in 1967 by both the AP and United Press International. He was described as an "Incredible athlete whose talents typified his play and teamwork. Had excellent speed and lateral pursuit. Opponents were timid when it came to attacking his side of the defensive line. Even with his size, he was a speed merchant. In the 1966 Rice encounter, John picked off an errant pass and returned it 42 yards for a touchdown."

== Professional career ==
Garlington was drafted by the Cleveland Browns in the second round (47th overall) of the 1968 NFL/AFL draft. He played ten seasons with the Cleveland Browns, from 1968 until 1977.

== Law enforcement career ==
After leaving professional football, Garlington worked, from 1986, as a Wildlife Enforcement Agent (game warden) with the Louisiana Department of Wildlife & Fisheries - Enforcement Division. He was promoted to the rank of Captain, in 1998, and was the commander of the department's Region 1 office near Shreveport, Louisiana. Prior to assuming command of Region 1, Garlington held the rank of Sergeant, and was assigned to the department's Statewide Strike Force. Garlington died in the line of duty, from drowning, while investigating a poaching complaint near his home on the Mill Creek Reservoir near Saline, LA in Bienville Parish. He had been on the force for 14 years. Garlington was survived by his wife Karon Garlington, and son Seth Garlington.

He is buried at the Ebenezer Cemetery off Louisiana Highway 508 in Bienville Parish. His son, Jonesboro police officer John Moses Garlington, was interred at this same cemetery in the spring of 1994.
