= Upper Ouachita National Wildlife Refuge =

United States wildlife refuge

- IUCN category IV (habitat/species management area)
- Location within the United States
- Location: Union and Morehouse Parishes
- Nearest city: West Monroe, Louisiana
- Coordinates: 32°52′00″N 92°05′00″W
- Area: 41,430 acres (167.7 km^{2})
- Established: 1978
- Visitors: 23,000 (in 2005)
- Governing body: U.S. Fish and Wildlife Service
- Website: Upper Ouachita National Wildlife Refuge

Upper Ouachita National Wildlife Refuge

Upper Ouachita National Wildlife Refuge was established in 1978 and is located in Union and Morehouse Parishes in northern Louisiana.

== Wildlife and habitat ==
Eighteen miles long and up to ten miles (16 km) wide, the refuge consists of over 14,500 acres (59 km^{2}) of bottomland hardwood forest, 5,000 acres (20 km^{2}) of upland forest, 3,000 acres (12 km^{2}) of shrub/wooded swamp, 16,000 acres (65 km^{2}) of reforested farmland, and 2,000 acres (8.1 km^{2}) of open water. About 80% of the refuge is subject to annual flooding from December through May.

The central physical feature is the Ouachita River, which bisects the refuge. The river's wide floodplain is characterized by alluvial soils. Refuge supports concentrations of ducks, geese, wading birds, raptors and a small wintering population of bald eagles.

The refuge provides excellent wintering habitat for tens of thousands of ducks and geese. The endangered red-cockaded woodpecker and the threatened Louisiana black bear are found on Upper Ouachita NWR. Other wildlife species that call the refuge home include alligators, deer, turkey, squirrels, bald eagles and beaver. Upper Ouachita NWR is one of the four refuges managed in the North Louisiana Refuge Complex.

== Management ==
Selective thinning and water level manipulation is conducted within the bottomland hardwoods for the benefit of migratory birds, resident wildlife and the overall health of the forest. Reforestation of bottomland hardwoods has taken place on the east side of the refuge. Emphasis was placed on planting the tree species that grew there historically. Approximately 983 acres (3.98 km^{2}) of the refuge are managed as moist soil units. These wetland units are managed for the benefit of waterfowl, shorebirds and other wildlife. Water levels are manipulated to produce high quality natural foods such as wild millets, grasses and sedges. Cooperative farming occurs on a rotational basis in portions of the refuge to provide food for wintering waterfowl.

The upland mixed pine hardwood forest on the western portion of the refuge is managed for the endangered red-cockaded woodpecker through thinning and prescribed fire. Installing artificial cavity inserts and woodpecker banding and occasional transplanting are also important management tools. Other management practices include wood duck nest box project, fish stocking, and removal of exotic, invasive plants and animals.

== See also ==
- List of National Wildlife Refuges: Louisiana
