= Black Bayou Lake National Wildlife Refuge =

United States wildlife refuge

- IUCN category IV (habitat/species management area)
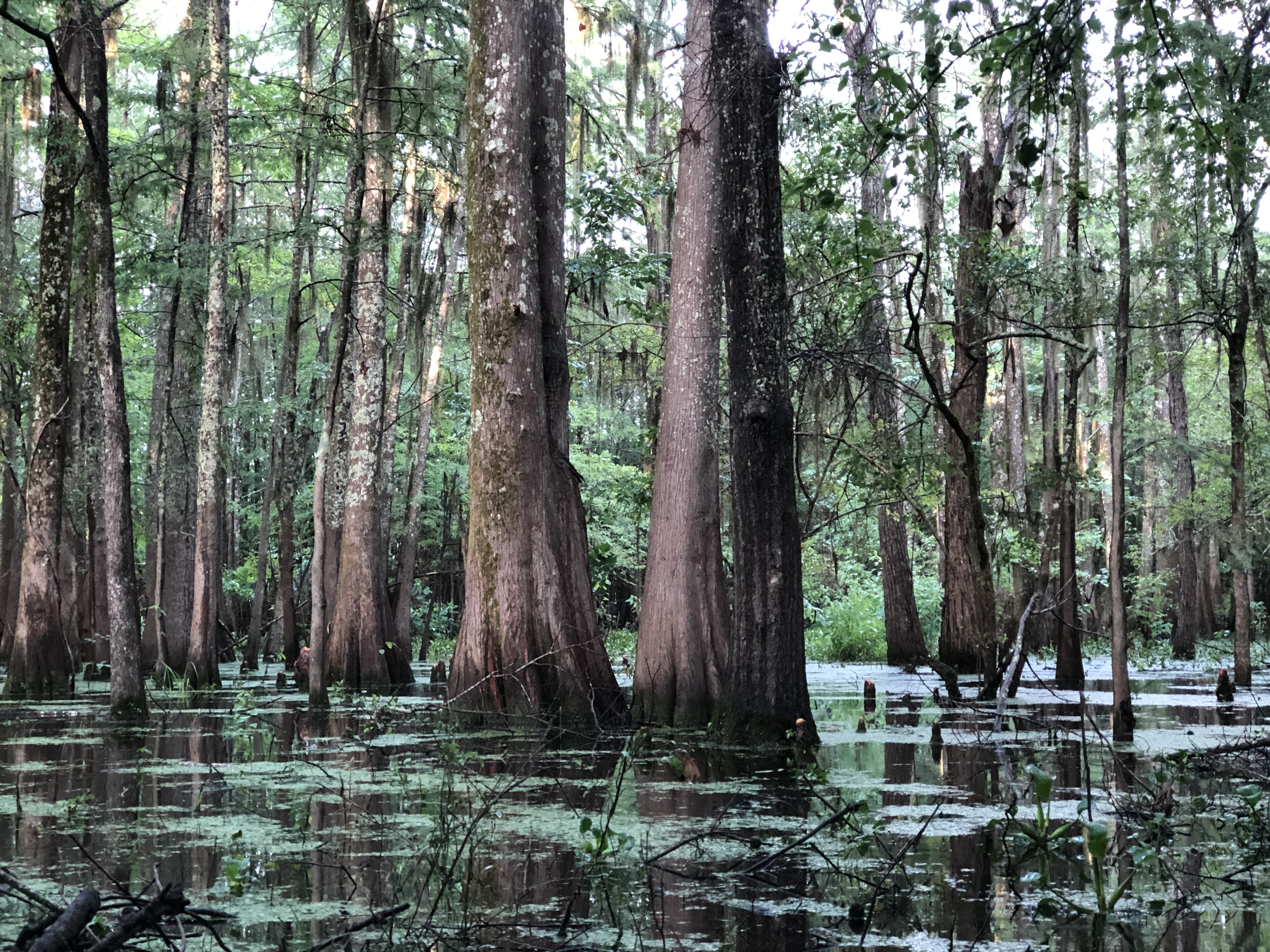
- Black Bayou Lake National Wildlife Refuge in Monroe, Louisiana, September 15, 2020.

- Location within the United States
- Location: Ouachita Parish, Louisiana
- Nearest city: Monroe, Louisiana
- Coordinates: 32°36′00″N 92°02′30″W
- Area: 4,200 acres (17 km^{2})
- Established: 1997
- Governing body: U.S. Fish and Wildlife Service
- Website: Black Bayou Lake National Wildlife Refuge

Black Bayou Lake National Wildlife Refuge

Black Bayou Lake National Wildlife Refuge is one of five refuges managed in the North Louisiana Refuge Complex and one of 545 refuges in the National Wildlife Refuge System. It was established in 1997 through a unique partnership with the city of Monroe, Louisiana. The U.S. Fish and Wildlife Service has a free 99-year lease to manage the city-owned lake.

== Wildlife and habitat ==
Black Bayou Lake is studded with cypress and tupelo trees, and surrounded by swamps that graduate into bottomland hardwoods and then into upland mixed pine/hardwoods. Cherrybark oak, cedar elm, ash, hickories and willow oak dominate the lower areas while shortleaf pine, loblolly pine, mockernut hickory and post oak dominate the upland sites. Common wildlife seen include alligators, wood ducks, bird-voiced treefrogs, banded water snakes, red-eared sliders, green herons, coyotes, skunks, and white-tailed deer. The refuge supports an excellent fisheries resource and provides valuable habitat for migratory waterfowl, neotropical migratory songbirds, and many resident wildlife species.

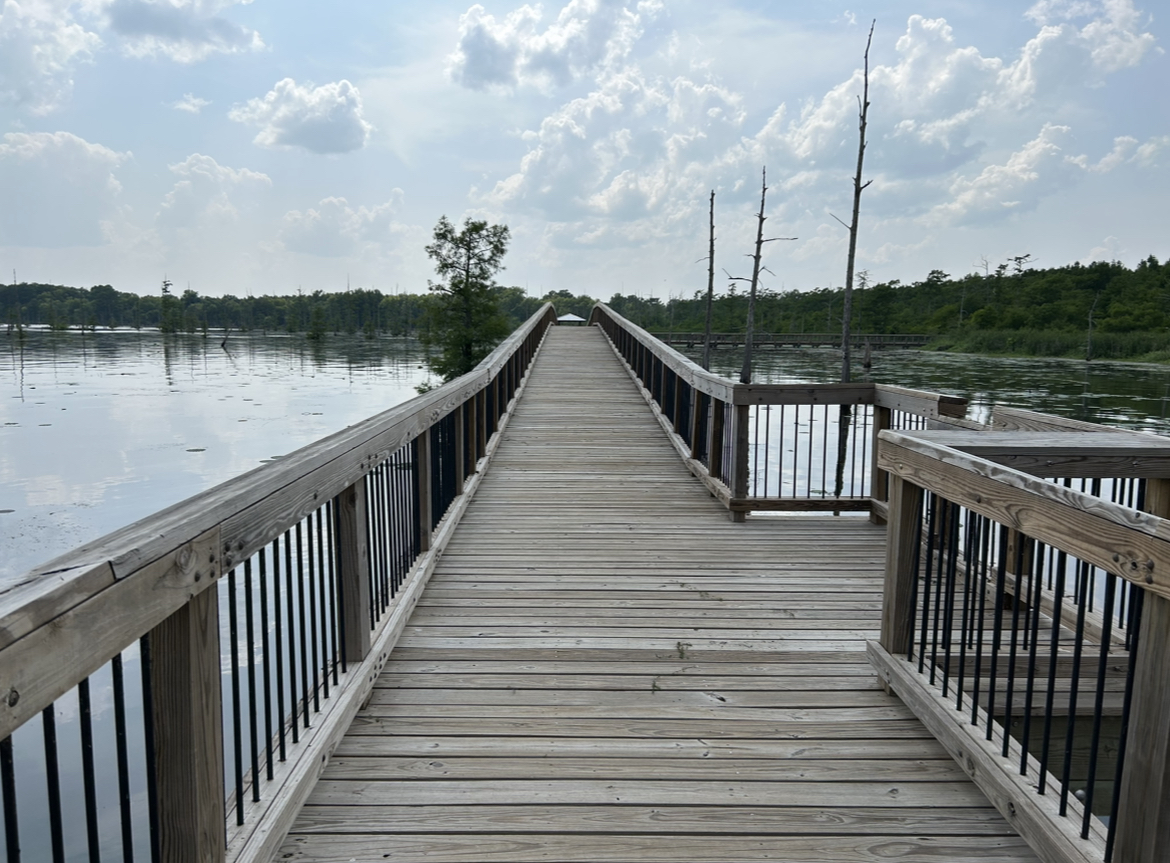
Black Bayou Lake National Wildlife Refuge in Monroe, Louisiana, December 12, 2021.

Biology professors and students from the University of Louisiana at Monroe have partnered with Black Bayou Lake refuge in research projects on fishes, reptiles and amphibians. The alligator snapping turtle, a species that has declined drastically across most of the south, nests along the shores of the lake. Nest surveys are conducted annually. Reducing the raccoon population helps to prevent destruction of all the alligator snapping turtle nests and many of other turtles species. The refuge has a large nest box program for prothonotary warblers and wood ducks. Wood ducks are banded on the refuge each year.

An area of 800 acres (3.2 km^{2}) of former agricultural fields has been reforested with eleven bottomland hardwood tree species. Existing forested wetlands are managed for forest health and wildlife habitat. The small upland area on the east side of the refuge is home to a remnant red-cockaded woodpecker (RCW) cluster. Some hardwoods have been removed to create a preferred habitat for this endangered species. Establishing the arboretum and prairie demonstration areas required repeated plantings and waterings. Annual mowing or burning maintains the prairie area. Some of the young arboretum trees must be protected from deer and rabbits with wire cages.

Control of exotic species (those not occurring naturally in this area) is a major activity on this refuge. Herbicide spraying helps to prevent water hyacinths from covering the lake. Controlling Chinese tallow trees is a matter of educating the public not to plant them as ornamental shade trees (birds disperse the seeds) and physically removing the trees, which are invading the reforested area of the refuge.

== Facilities ==
The complex visitor center, a restored planter's house, is situated on the 40-acre (160,000 m^{2}) Black Bayou Lake Environmental Education Center. Adjacent to the visitor center are an arboretum with over 100 native Louisiana woody plants and a prairie demonstration area with native grasses and wildflowers. Facilities also include interactive visitor center exhibits, a mile long raised asphalt/boardwalk nature trail with 400-foot (120 m) wildlife pier, boat launch, amphitheater and pavilion, a raised observation deck with spotting scope and several informational kiosks. Members of Friends of Black Bayou, Inc., a refuge support group, provide thousands of hours of services for the refuge.

== See also ==
- List of National Wildlife Refuges: Louisiana
