= Big Creek (Bayou de Loutre tributary) =

River in Union Parish, Louisiana, United States

Coordinates: 32°49′28″N 92°16′28″W

Big Creek, also referred to as Big Creek Bottom, is a medium-sized creek located in Union Parish, Louisiana, United States. The stream is a tributary to Bayou de Loutre. The stream headwaters arise just to the northwest of Marion and it flows south to southwest for approximately 7.5 miles to its confluence about three miles ease-southeast of the community of De Loutre.
