= Louisiana Wildlife Agents Association =

Organization of current and retired Louisiana Wildlife Enforcement Agents

The Louisiana Wildlife Agents Association (LWAA) is a non-profit fraternal police organization made up of current and retired Louisiana Wildlife Enforcement Agents. It was founded in 1972. The LWAA lists as its goals to: Foster, protect and promote the welfare and interest of all classified commissioned wildlife enforcement agents, active or retired. Encourage and promote the constant improvement of public service rendered by the Division of Enforcement, Department of Wildlife and Fisheries.

== Philanthropy ==
The LWAA is also a service organization that provides service and funding to the following: Fallen Officers of the Louisiana Wildlife & Fisheries Enforcement Division & families, Louisiana Law Enforcement Fallen Officers Fund, Louisiana Special Olympics Program; Law Enforcement Torch Run, Hunting and Boating Safety (Education Programs, Public Service, Announcements, Billboards ), National Hunting & Fishing Day, Children's Hospital, American Heart Association, St. Jude's Hospital, Louisiana Lions Camp For Children, Muscular Dystrophy Association, American Cancer Society, Toys to Recovery, Louis Infant Crisis Center, Becoming an Outdoor Woman, Operation Game Thief, Camp Quality.

In 2010 LWAA donated $2000.00 and teamed with KJLO-FM (K104) in Monroe, along with merchants Spotted Dog Sporting Goods in Columbia and Academy Sporting Goods in West Monroe, to provide Christmas gifts for needy children.

The organization publishes The Louisiana Game Warden magazine.
