= Louisiana State Troopers Association =

- Abbreviation: LSTA
- Formation: January 1, 1969; 57 years ago
- Type: Non-profit fraternal police union
- Legal status: Active
- Purpose: Improved pay and benefits; better working environment; support for members; increased quality of life for members; improved public services.
- Headquarters: Baton Rouge, Louisiana
- Region served: Louisiana
- Fields: Law enforcement, labor union
- Official language: English
- Main organ: The Louisiana Trooper magazine
- Funding: Citizen donations
- Website: www.lsta.org

The Louisiana State Troopers Association (LSTA) is a non-profit fraternal police union that is made up primarily of current and retired Louisiana State Troopers. The organization was formed in 1969. Its headquarters are in Baton Rouge, Louisiana. The LSTA is committed to improved pay and benefits; to assuring a better working environment; to providing support when needed; and to increasing the quality of life for its members. It also strives to improve the public services provided by its members to the community. The organization publishes The Louisiana Trooper magazine.

According to the LSTA website, citizen's donations are accepted, but the organization never calls people's homes to solicit contributions.
