= D'Arbonne National Wildlife Refuge =

National Wildlife Refuge in Louisiana

- IUCN category IV (habitat/species management area)
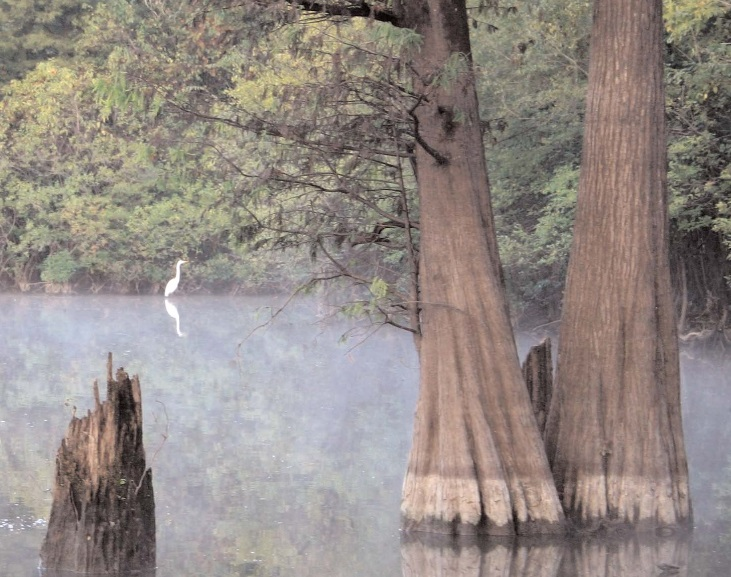
- D'Arbonne National Wildlife Refuge on November 18, 2013.

- Location within the United States
- Location: Ouachita and Union Parish, Louisiana
- Nearest city: West Monroe, Louisiana
- Coordinates: 32°36′30″N 92°13′00″W
- Established: 1986
- Governing body: U.S. Fish and Wildlife Service
- Website: D'Arbonne National Wildlife Refuge

D'Arbonne National Wildlife Refuge

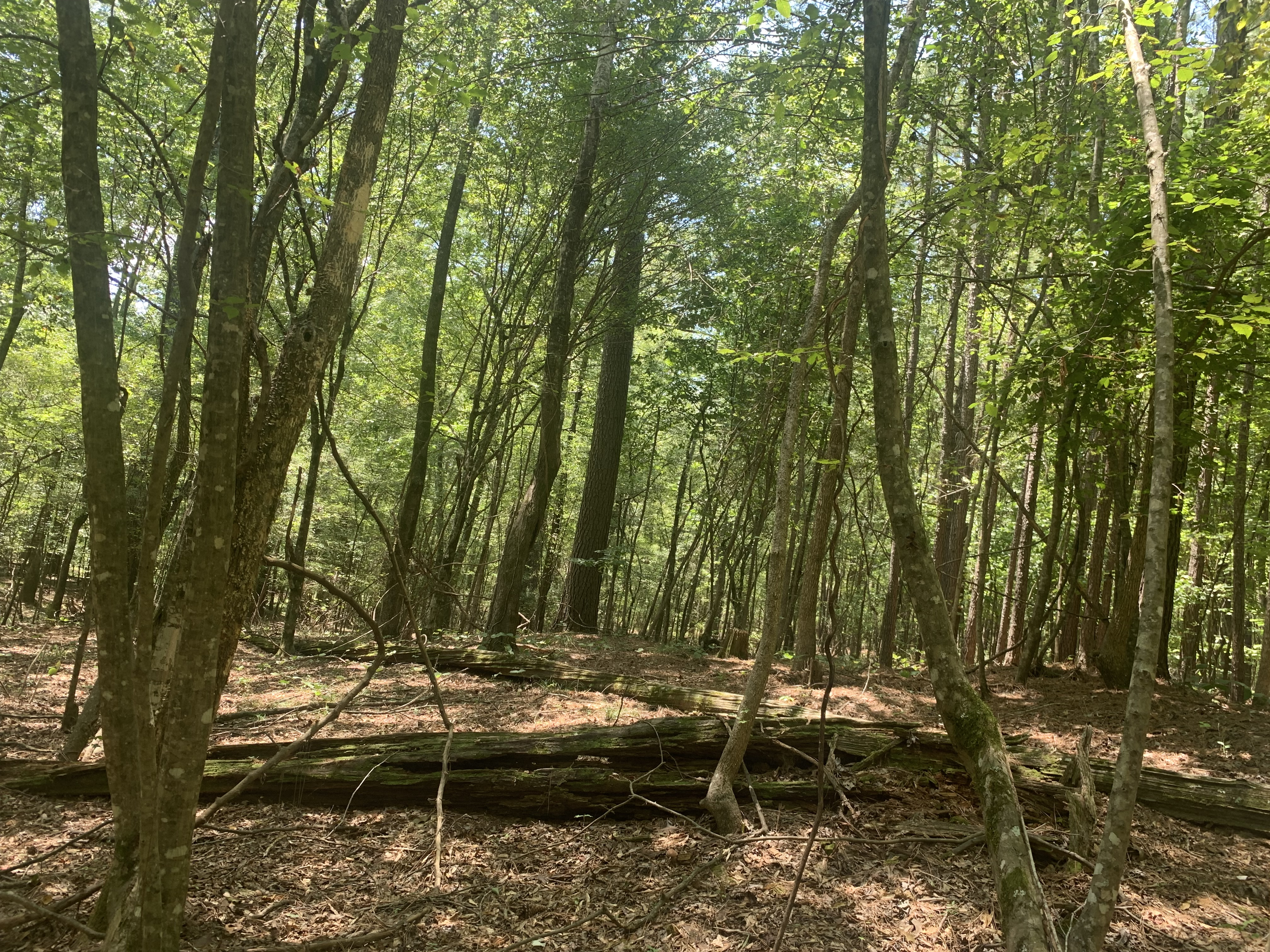
D’Arbonne National Wildlife Refuge

D'Arbonne National Wildlife Refuge is a National Wildlife Refuge of the United States located north of West Monroe, Louisiana. It is in Ouachita and Union Parishes on either side of Bayou D'Arbonne near its confluence with the Ouachita River. It lies on the western edge of the Mississippi River alluvial valley. It was established in 1975 to protect bottomland hardwoods and provide wintering habitat for migratory waterfowl. D'Arbonne is one of four refuges managed in the North Louisiana Refuges Complex.

== Ecology ==
The refuge is bisected by 13 miles of Bayou D'Arbonne and is crisscrossed by numerous creeks, sloughs, and oxbow lakes. Cypress swamps and bottomland hardwood and upland forests provide several types of habitat for native plants and animals. Local species include the American alligator, Rafinesque's big-eared bat, the bald eagle, and the red-cockaded woodpecker.

In years of normal or above rainfall, the refuge's bottomland hardwood forest is a very important overflow area for the Ouachita River basin. High water levels, which usually occur between January and May, can flood up to 87% of the refuge. The wetland forests not only provide habitat to wetland-dependent wildlife, but they also reduce damage from flooding in developed areas. They filter silt and pollutants from the water and they provide recharge areas for aquifers.

== Recreation ==
No camping is allowed on the refuge. Camping areas can be found in nearby Lake D'Arbonne State Park.

== See also ==
- List of National Wildlife Refuges: Louisiana
