= Union Parish, Louisiana =

Parish in Louisiana, United States

Coordinates: 32.83°N 92.38°W

- Parish
- Parish of Union; Paroisse de l'Union (French)
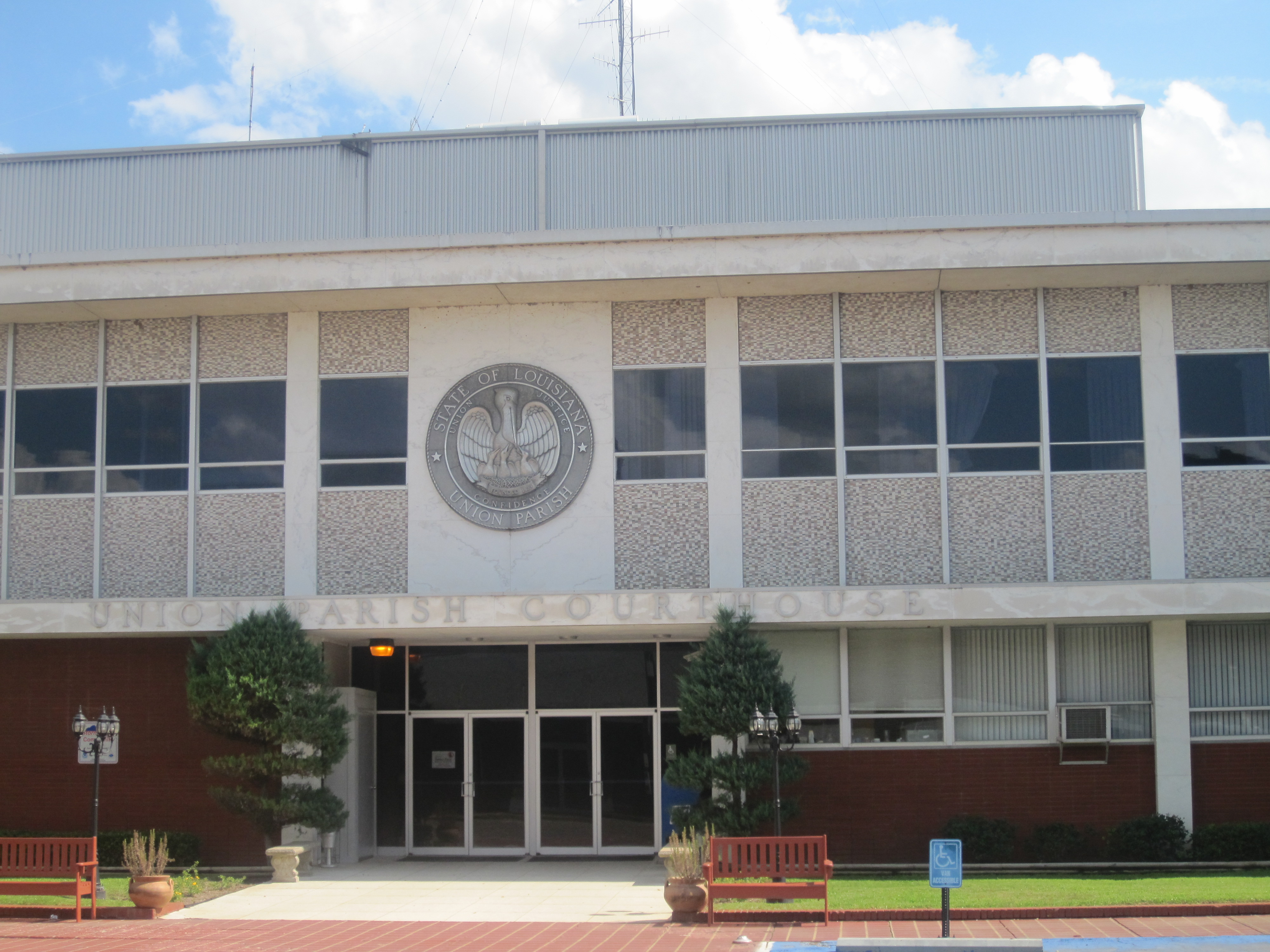
- Union Parish Courthouse in Farmerville

- Location within the U.S. state of Louisiana

- Louisiana's location within the U.S.
- Country: United States
- State: Louisiana
- Region: North Louisiana
- Founded: March 13, 1839
- Named for: Union of American states
- Parish seat (and largest town): Farmerville

Area
  - Total: 905 sq mi (2,340 km^{2})
  - Land: 877 sq mi (2,270 km^{2})
  - Water: 28 sq mi (73 km^{2})
  - percentage: 3.06 sq mi (7.9 km^{2})

Population (2020)
  - Total: 21,107
  - Estimate (2025): 20,561 ▼
  - Density: 24.1/sq mi (9.29/km^{2})
- Time zone: UTC-6 (CST)
  - Summer (DST): UTC-5 (CDT)
- Area code: 318
- Congressional district: 4th

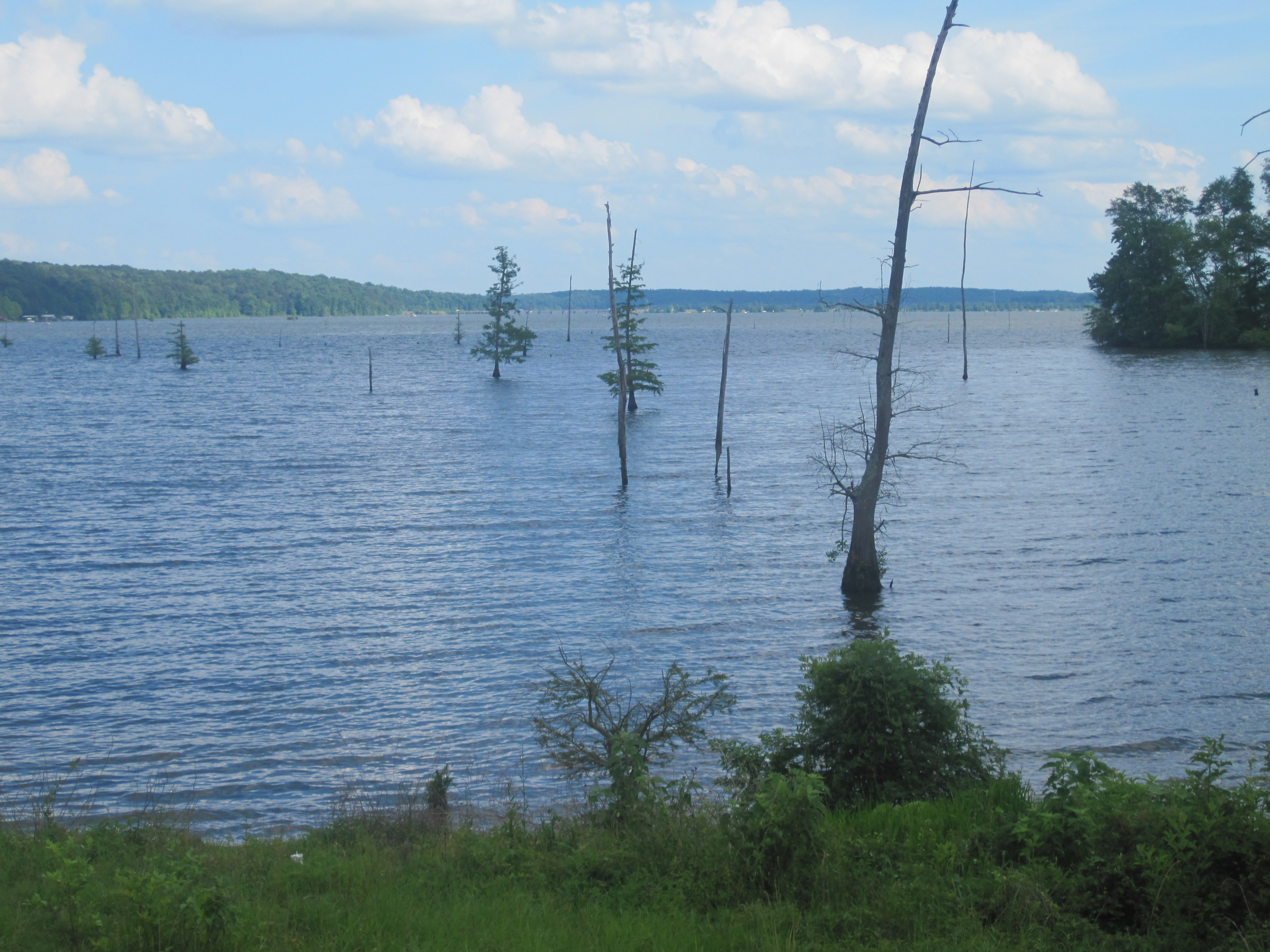
Lake D'Arbonne west of Farmerville.

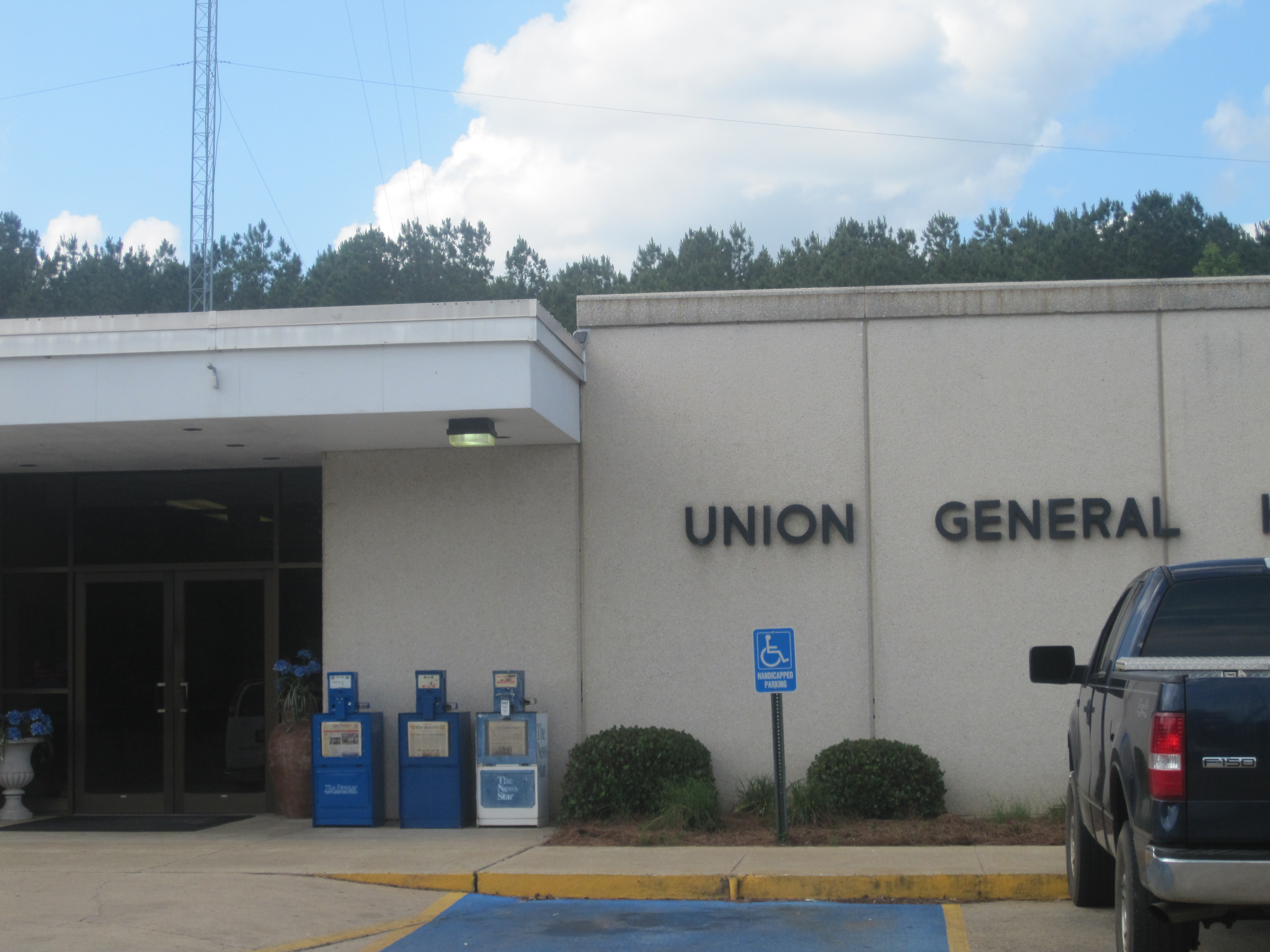
Union General Hospital in Farmerville.

Union Parish (French: Paroisse de l'Union) is a parish located in the north central section of the U.S. state of Louisiana. As of the 2020 census, the population was 21,107. The parish seat is Farmerville. The parish was created on March 13, 1839, from a section of Ouachita Parish. Its boundaries have changed four times since then (in 1845, 1846, 1867, and 1873, respectively).

Union Parish is part of the Monroe, LA Metropolitan Statistical Area.

== Geography ==
According to the U.S. Census Bureau, the parish has a total area of 905 square miles (2,340 km^{2}), of which 877 square miles (2,270 km^{2}) is land and 28 square miles (73 km^{2}) (3.1%) is water.

Geographically north central Louisiana, Union Parish more closely resembles Lincoln Parish, to which Union is deeply tied culturally, politically, and educationally. Union Parish, along with Lincoln Parish to the southwest and Union County, Arkansas to the north, form the eastern boundary of the Ark-La-Tex region.

=== Major highways ===
- / U.S. Highway 63 / U.S. Highway 167
- Louisiana Highway 2
  - LA 2 Alt.
- Louisiana Highway 15
- Louisiana Highway 33
- Louisiana Highway 143
- Louisiana Highway 145
- Louisiana Highway 151
- Louisiana Highway 348
- Louisiana Highway 549
- Louisiana Highway 550
- Louisiana Highway 551
- Louisiana Highway 552
- Louisiana Highway 558
- Louisiana Highway 826
- Louisiana Highway 827
- Louisiana Highway 828
- Louisiana Highway 3121
- Louisiana Highway 3281

=== Adjacent parishes and counties ===
- Union County, Arkansas (northwest)
- Ashley County, Arkansas (northeast)
- Morehouse Parish (east)
- Ouachita Parish (southeast)
- Lincoln Parish (southwest)
- Claiborne Parish (west)

=== National protected areas ===
- D'Arbonne National Wildlife Refuge (part)
- Upper Ouachita National Wildlife Refuge (part)

== Communities ==
=== Towns ===
- Bernice
- Farmerville (parish seat and largest municipality)
- Marion

=== Villages ===
- Conway
- Downsville
- Junction City
- Lillie
- Spearsville

=== Unincorporated communities ===
- Alabama Landing
- Oakland
- Ouachita City
- Point
- Shiloh
- Truxno

== Demographics ==
Historical population
Census	Pop.	Note	%±
1840	1,838		—
1850	8,203		346.3%
1860	10,389		26.6%
1870	11,685		12.5%
1880	13,526		15.8%
1890	17,304		27.9%
1900	18,520		7.0%
1910	20,451		10.4%
1920	19,621		−4.1%
1930	20,731		5.7%
1940	20,943		1.0%
1950	19,141		−8.6%
1960	17,624		−7.9%
1970	18,447		4.7%
1980	21,167		14.7%
1990	20,690		−2.3%
2000	22,803		10.2%
2010	22,721		−0.4%
2020	21,107		−7.1%
2025 (est.)	20,561	▼	−2.6%
U.S. Decennial Census; 1790-1960 1900-1990; 1990-2000 2010

=== Racial and ethnic composition ===
Union Parish, Louisiana – Racial and ethnic composition Note: the US Census treats Hispanic/Latino as an ethnic category. This table excludes Latinos from the racial categories and assigns them to a separate category. Hispanics/Latinos may be of any race.
Race / Ethnicity (NH = Non-Hispanic)	Pop 1980	Pop 1990	Pop 2000	Pop 2010	Pop 2020	% 1980	% 1990	% 2000	% 2010	% 2020
White alone (NH)	14,854	14,775	15,772	15,398	14,289	70.18%	71.41%	69.17%	67.77%	67.70%
Black or African American alone (NH)	6,112	5,742	6,355	6,153	4,980	28.88%	27.75%	27.87%	27.08%	23.59%
Native American or Alaska Native alone (NH)	18	18	40	53	59	0.09%	0.09%	0.18%	0.23%	0.28%
Asian alone (NH)	14	22	58	31	38	0.07%	0.11%	0.25%	0.14%	0.18%
Native Hawaiian or Pacific Islander alone (NH)	x	x	11	16	6	x	x	0.05%	0.07%	0.03%
Other race alone (NH)	5	0	8	2	30	0.02%	0.00%	0.04%	0.01%	0.14%
Mixed race or Multiracial (NH)	x	x	98	125	570	x	x	0.43%	0.55%	2.70%
Hispanic or Latino (any race)	164	133	461	943	1,135	0.77%	0.64%	2.02%	4.15%	5.38%
Total	21,167	20,690	22,803	22,721	21,107	100.00%	100.00%	100.00%	100.00%	100.00%

=== 2020 census ===
As of the 2020 census, Union Parish had a population of 21,107 and 4,899 families, and the median age was 44.9 years. 21.2% of residents were under the age of 18 and 21.6% of residents were 65 years of age or older. For every 100 females there were 98.6 males, and for every 100 females age 18 and over there were 96.9 males age 18 and over.

There were 8,759 households in the parish, of which 27.6% had children under the age of 18 living in them. Of all households, 46.8% were married-couple households, 20.1% were households with a male householder and no spouse or partner present, and 28.1% were households with a female householder and no spouse or partner present. About 29.4% of all households were made up of individuals and 13.3% had someone living alone who was 65 years of age or older.

The racial makeup of the parish was 68.5% White, 23.7% Black or African American, 0.4% American Indian and Alaska Native, 0.2% Asian, <0.1% Native Hawaiian and Pacific Islander, 3.4% from some other race, and 3.8% from two or more races. Hispanic or Latino residents of any race comprised 5.4% of the population.

<0.1% of residents lived in urban areas, while 100.0% lived in rural areas.

There were 10,334 housing units, of which 15.2% were vacant. Among occupied housing units, 78.7% were owner-occupied and 21.3% were renter-occupied. The homeowner vacancy rate was 1.4% and the rental vacancy rate was 9.8%.

== Politics ==
Located in far northern Louisiana next to the Arkansas state line, Union Parish is heavily Republican in most competitive elections, particularly at the presidential level, last voting for a Democratic presidential nominee in 1952 when Adlai Stevenson received 52% of the vote.

United States presidential election results for Union Parish, Louisiana
Year	Republican		Democratic		Third party(ies)	
Year	No.	%	No.	%	No.	%
1912	11	1.39%	696	87.66%	87	10.96%
1916	22	1.95%	1,106	97.96%	1	0.09%
1920	98	7.43%	1,221	92.57%	0	0.00%
1924	7	0.79%	875	99.09%	1	0.11%
1928	422	27.97%	1,085	71.90%	2	0.13%
1932	58	2.48%	2,285	97.52%	0	0.00%
1936	272	13.27%	1,778	86.73%	0	0.00%
1940	371	11.55%	2,842	88.45%	0	0.00%
1944	803	31.27%	1,765	68.73%	0	0.00%
1948	259	9.07%	724	25.35%	1,873	65.58%
1952	1,894	47.96%	2,055	52.04%	0	0.00%
1956	1,384	40.49%	878	25.69%	1,156	33.82%
1960	2,017	49.64%	1,034	25.45%	1,012	24.91%
1964	4,534	79.70%	1,155	20.30%	0	0.00%
1968	1,113	16.50%	1,336	19.80%	4,297	63.70%
1972	4,322	70.20%	1,465	23.79%	370	6.01%
1976	4,139	52.36%	3,600	45.54%	166	2.10%
1980	5,130	55.77%	3,841	41.76%	227	2.47%
1984	6,585	67.73%	2,916	29.99%	222	2.28%
1988	5,900	62.97%	3,210	34.26%	259	2.76%
1992	4,434	44.04%	4,005	39.78%	1,630	16.19%
1996	4,418	46.30%	4,260	44.64%	865	9.06%
2000	5,772	61.78%	3,205	34.30%	366	3.92%
2004	7,457	69.57%	3,089	28.82%	172	1.60%
2008	7,619	70.10%	3,103	28.55%	146	1.34%
2012	7,561	70.23%	3,075	28.56%	130	1.21%
2016	7,972	73.18%	2,691	24.70%	231	2.12%
2020	8,407	75.06%	2,654	23.69%	140	1.25%
2024	8,176	78.05%	2,206	21.06%	93	0.89%

== School ==
Residents are assigned to Union Parish Public Schools.

== Law enforcement ==
Union Parish Sheriff's Office
- Abbreviation: UPSO
- Motto: Service Before Self

Agency overview
- Formed: 1839

Jurisdictional structure
- General nature: Civilian police

Operational structure
- Headquarters: Farmerville, Louisiana
- Agency executive: Dusty Gates, Sheriff

Website
- http://www.unionsheriff.com/

The Union Parish Sheriff's Office is the primary law enforcement agency of Union Parish, Louisiana. It is headquartered in Farmerville. The current Sheriff of Union Parish is Dusty Gates, who was first sworn as the sheriff following long time Sheriff Bob Buckley's death in September 2013.

== Border monument ==
In 1931, a monument was erected at the Union Parish border with Union County, Arkansas. In 1975, State Representative Louise B. Johnson passed a law to refurbish the monument. The completed restoration was unveiled in 2009.

== Notable people ==
Two Louisiana governors came from the Shiloh Community in Union Parish:

- William Wright Heard, 1900–1904
- Ruffin Pleasant, 1916–1920

Two Arkansas governors were natives of Union Parish:

- George Washington Donaghey, Governor of Arkansas from 1909 to 1913
- Tom Jefferson Terral, Governor of Arkansas from 1925 to 1927

Other Union Parish residents have included:

- Lonnie O. Aulds, state representative from 1968 to 1972
- George Washington Bolton (1841–1931), state representative from 1888 to 1896 from Alexandria
- Jay McCallum - Chief Judge of the Louisiana 3rd Judicial District Court
- Lee Emmett Thomas, Speaker of the Louisiana House of Representative

== See also ==
- National Register of Historic Places listings in Union Parish, Louisiana
- Big Creek (Union Parish, LA)

== Sources ==
Many facts concerning events in early Union Parish history come from the conveyance, probate, and lawsuit records on file in the Union Parish courthouse, as well as records of the United States Land Offices available in the National Archives. Other sources include:

1) Williams, E. Russ Jr., Spanish Poste d’Ouachita: The Ouachita Valley in Colonial Louisiana 1783–1804, and Early American Statehood, 1804–1820, Williams Genealogical Publications, Monroe, LA, 1995.

2) Williams, E. Russ Jr., Encyclopedia of Individuals and Founding Families of the Ouachita Valley of Louisiana From 1785 to 1850: Organized into Family Groups with Miscellaneous Materials on Historical Events, Places, and Other Important Topics, Part Oe A – K, Williams Genealogical and Historical Publications, Monroe, LA, 1996.

3) Williams, E. Russ Jr., Encyclopedia of Individuals and Founding Families of the Ouachita Valley of Louisiana From 1785 to 1850: Organized into Family Groups with Miscellaneous Materials on Historical Events, Places, and Other Important Topics, Part Two L – O, Williams Genealogical and Historical Publications, Monroe, LA, 1997.

4) Williams, Max Harrison, Union Parish (Louisiana) Historical Records: Police Jury Minutes, 1839–1846, D’Arbonne Research and Publishing Co., Farmerville, LA, 1993.
