= Hudd (disambiguation) =

A hudd is a shelter used during funeral services.

Hudd may also refer to:

- Bill Hudd (fl. 1925), Australian Rules footballer
- Damien Hudd (born 1981), Welsh rugby player
- Roy Hudd (1936–2020), English comedian
- Thomas R. Hudd (1835 – 1896), U.S. Congressman
- Walter Hudd (1897 – 1963), British actor

== See also ==
- HUD (disambiguation)
