= Marine Region =

- Common name: Marine Police

Agency overview
- Formed: 1846; 180 years ago
- Employees: 2,424 officers

Jurisdictional structure
- Operations jurisdiction: Hong Kong
- General nature: Civilian police
- Specialist jurisdiction: Coastal patrol, marine border protection, marine search and rescue

Operational structure
- Parent agency: Hong Kong Police Force

The Marine Region is a branch of the Hong Kong Police Force, more widely known as the Marine Police. The marine police patrols 1,651 km^{2} (637 sq mi) of waters within the territory of Hong Kong, including 263 islands. The Marine Region is made up of about 3,000 officers. It has a fleet of 142 boats in total, the largest of any civil police force in the world.

The Marine Region usually mounts shore patrol to police the smaller islands and isolated communities with no land transport to other parts of the Hong Kong, and participates in the Hong Kong Maritime Rescue Co-ordination Centre, which is responsible for co-ordinating maritime rescue operations both within and outside Hong Kong waters. The region's headquarters are located at Sai Wan Ho.

== History ==
The Hong Kong 'Water Police' had a role from the earliest days of British Hong Kong. The first actual vessel was acquired in 1846 – a sailing 'gun-boat' with a crew of 17, which was used for anti-piracy work. The vessel and its entire crew were lost in a typhoon two years later. By then the unit consisted of approximately 40 men and three boats. Each Constable in a six-man crew was armed with a pistol and a cutlass.

After World War II, as part of a major reshaping of the police force, the service was renamed 'Marine Police'. During the 1966 Star Ferry riots, the Marine Police provided a riot company which was deployed in action on Nathan Road. As part of the response to the 2019–2020 Hong Kong protests, the Marine Police participated in Operation Tiderider aimed at quelling the ensuing riots.

== Organisation ==
The Marine Region comprises a Regional Headquarters and two sea districts. The entire region is commanded by a Regional Commander with the rank of Assistant Commissioner, who is assisted by a Chief Superintendent. Each of the three bureaus is commanded by a Senior Superintendent; divisions and units are commanded by Superintendents, who are assisted by Chief Inspectors.

The Marine Region comprises approximately 3,000 officers overseeing around 13,000 local craft and a total maritime population of 14,100. In addition to normal marine policing functions, the marine police is also responsible for countering illegal immigration and smuggling at sea.

The Region comprises:

- Operations Bureau is responsible for all operational matters at Regional level, including:
  - Operations Division
    - Regional Crime Units investigating crimes and syndicated illegal immigration by sea;
    - RCCC;
    - Logistics Unit;
    - Regional Motor Transport Office;
    - Regional Armoury;
  - Small Boat Division.
  - Crime Marine
- Administration Bureau is responsible for general administration; personnel and establishment matters.
- Support Bureau is responsible for:
  - management of the launch acquisition programmes;
  - training and assessment of Marine police personnel in navigation, seamanship, engineering, and safety; and
  - selection and acquisition of specialist equipment.
  - core property strategy in Marine Region

== Headquarters ==
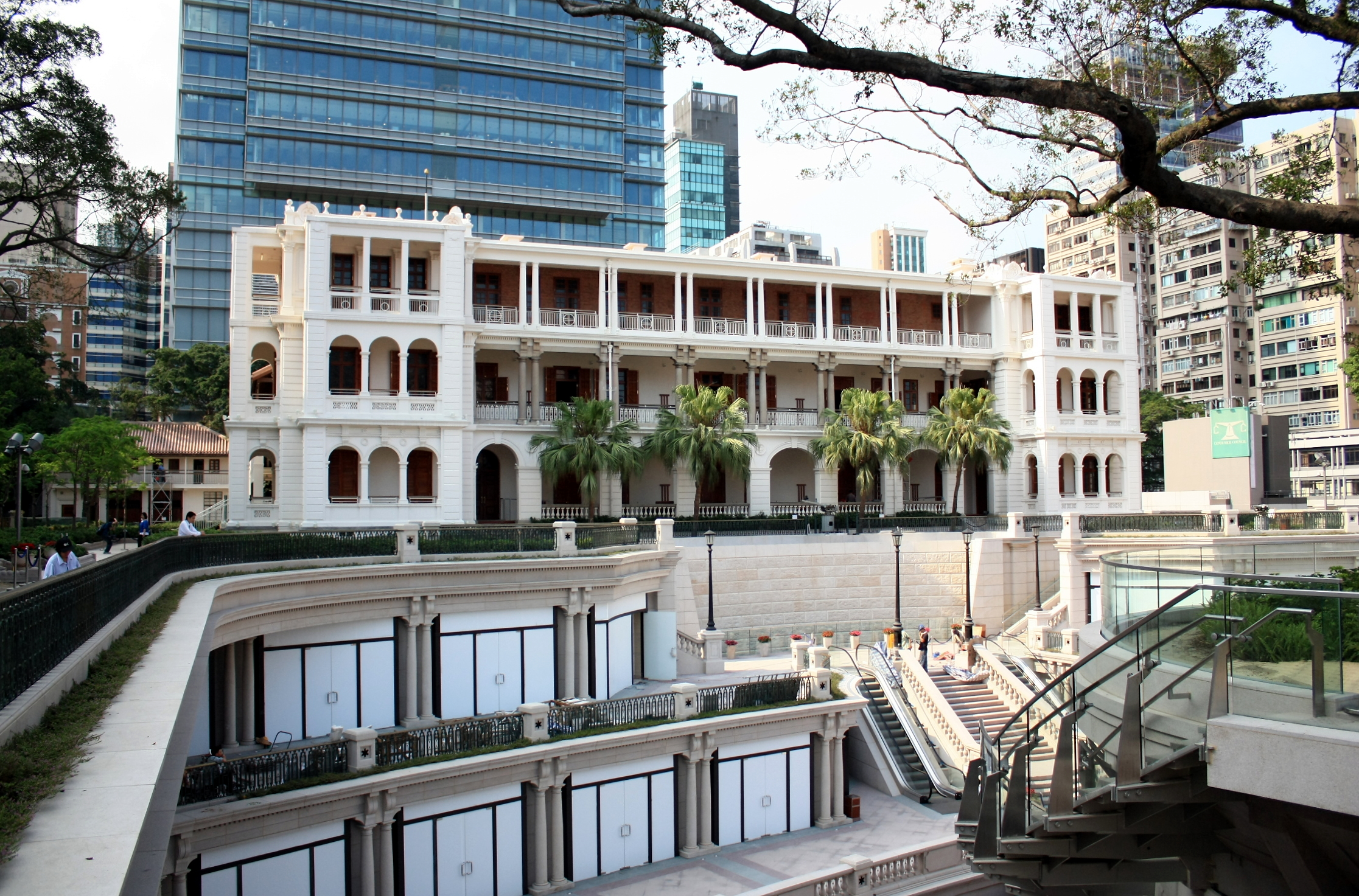
Former Marine Police station after renovation

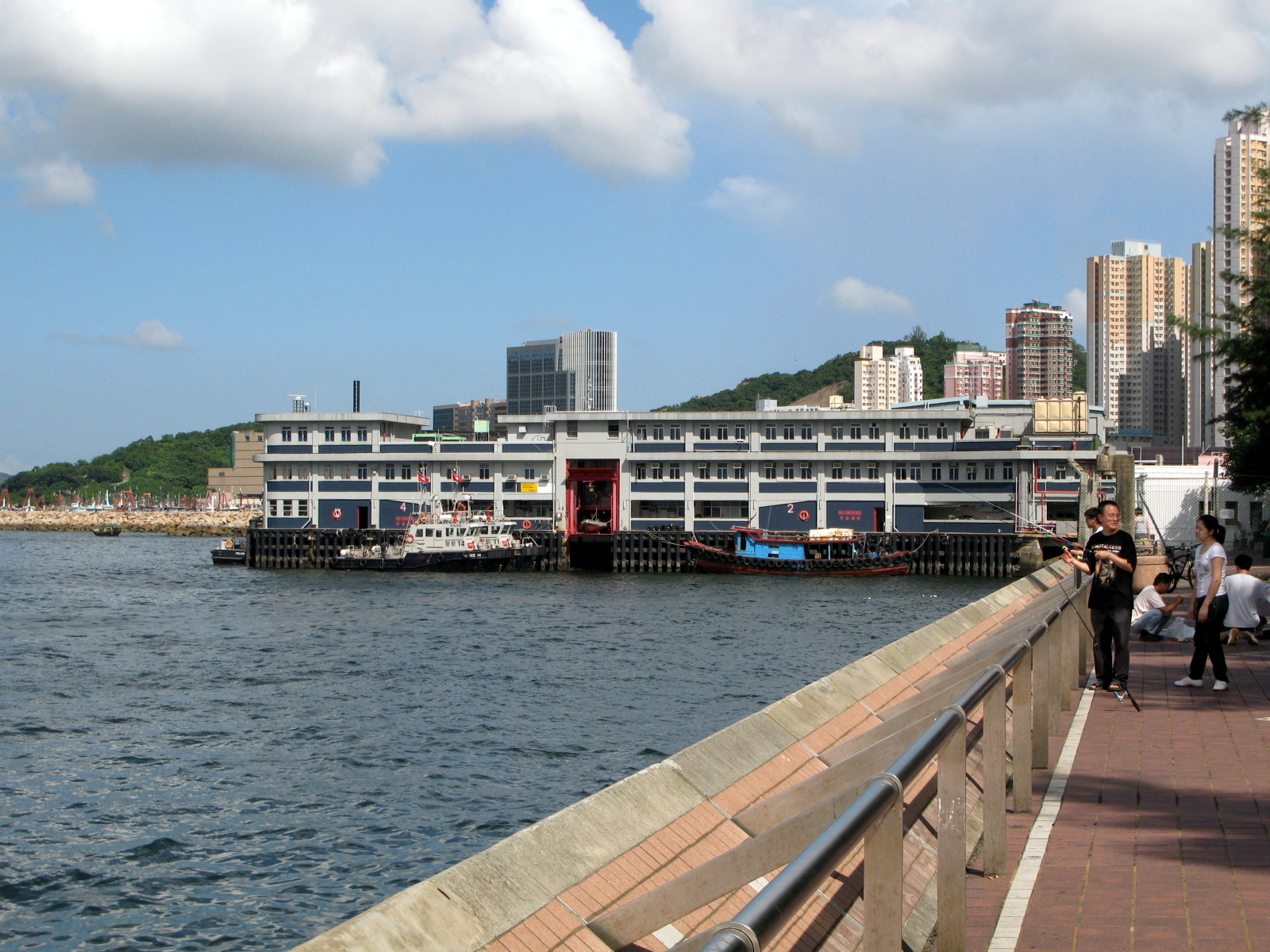
Sai Wan Ho Marine Police Regional Headquarters.

The Marine Region had its headquarters at the Former Marine Police Headquarters Compound in Tsim Sha Tsui until 1996, when they were relocated to Sai Wan Ho. The old headquarters have now become a heritage tourism facility known as 1881 Heritage.

== Gallery ==
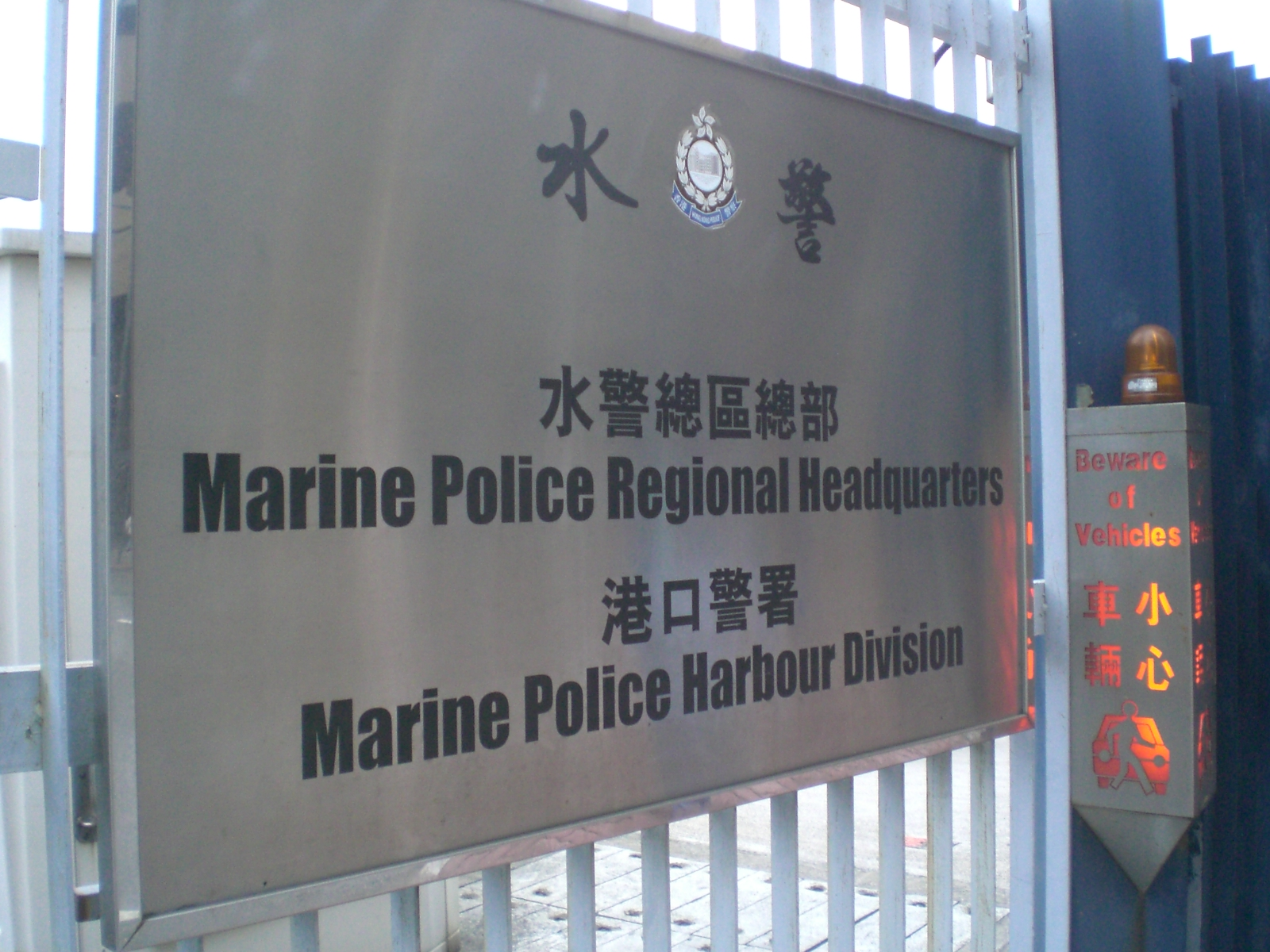
Sai Wan Ho Marine Police Regional Headquarters.

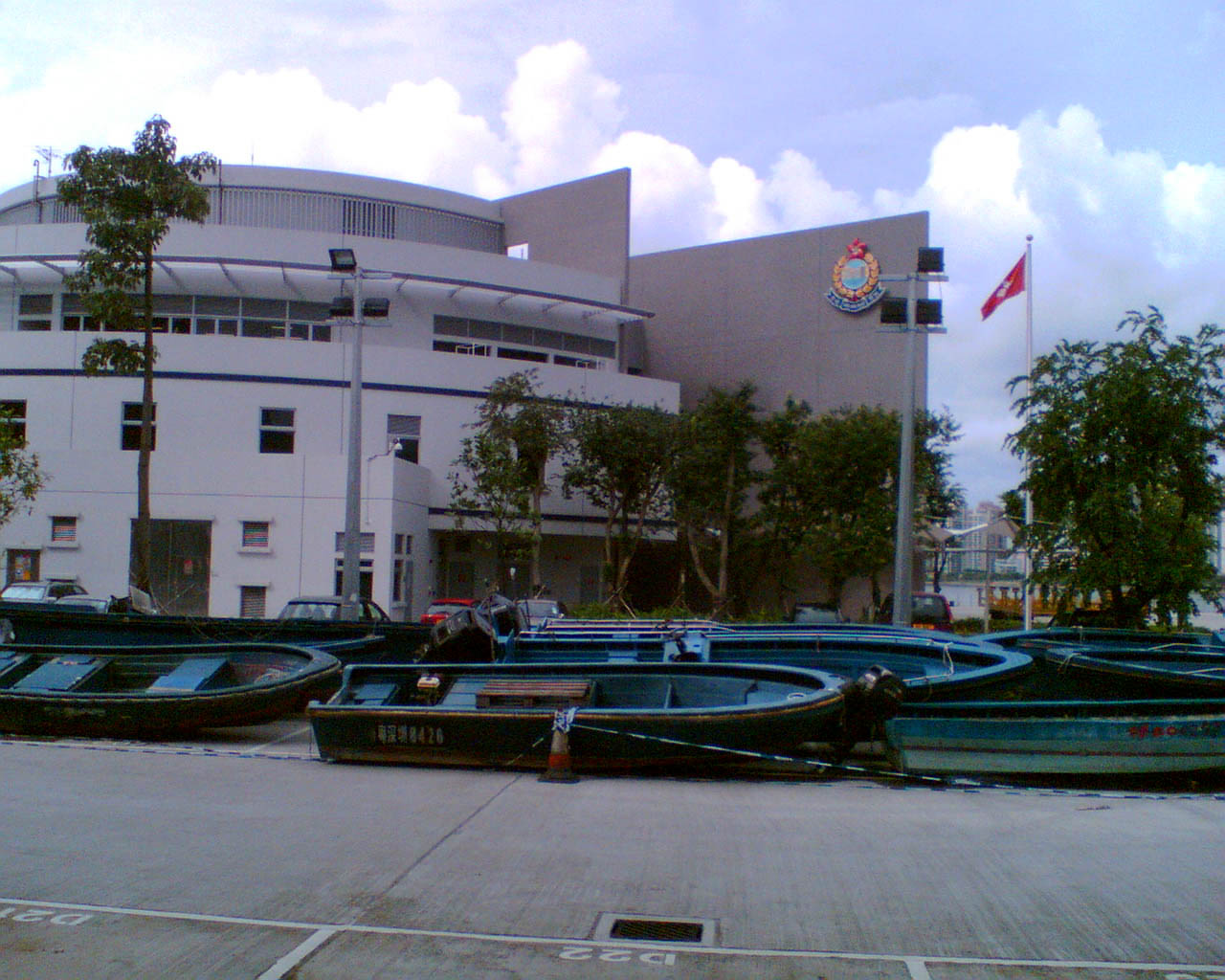
Marine Police North Division.

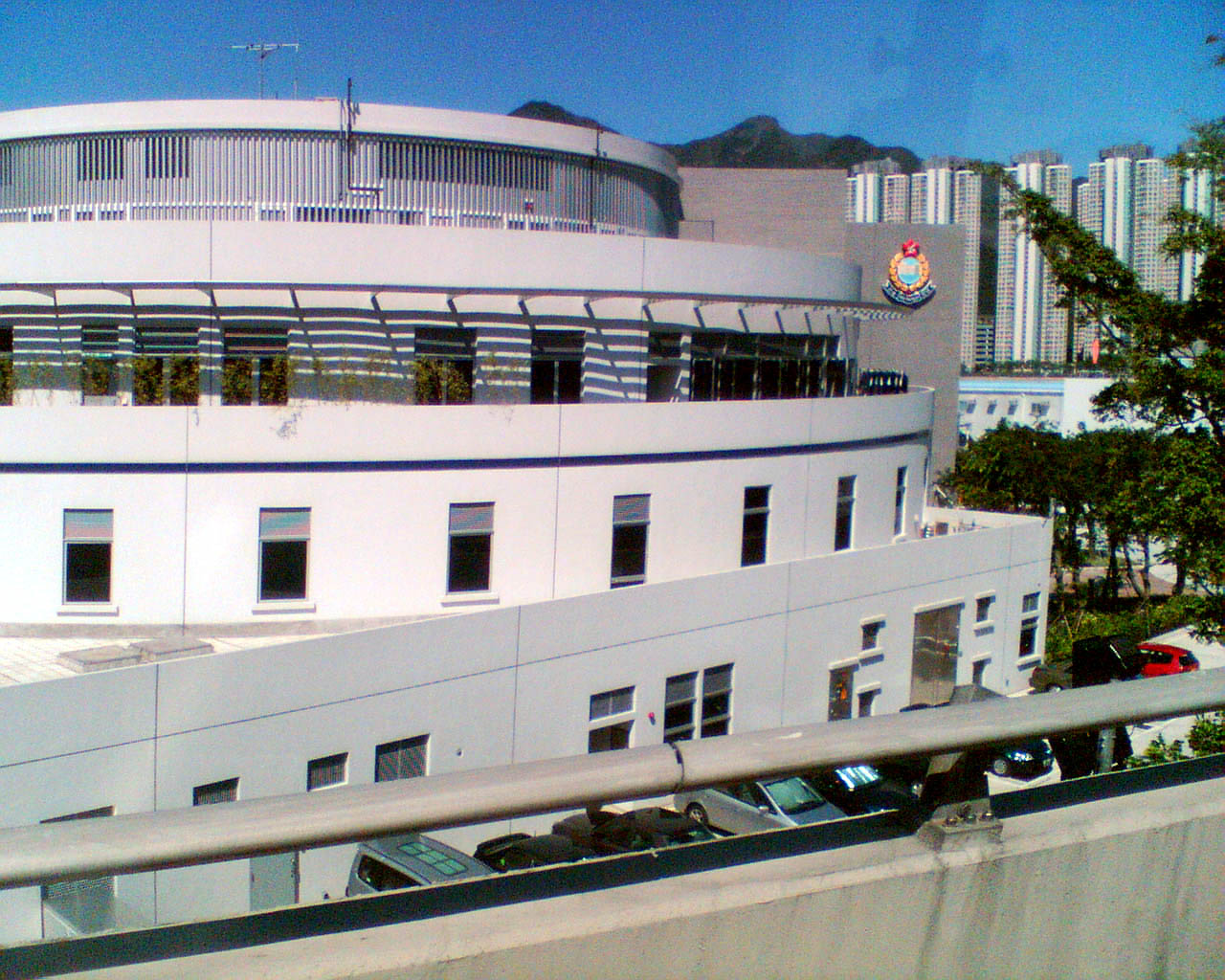
Marine Police North Division.

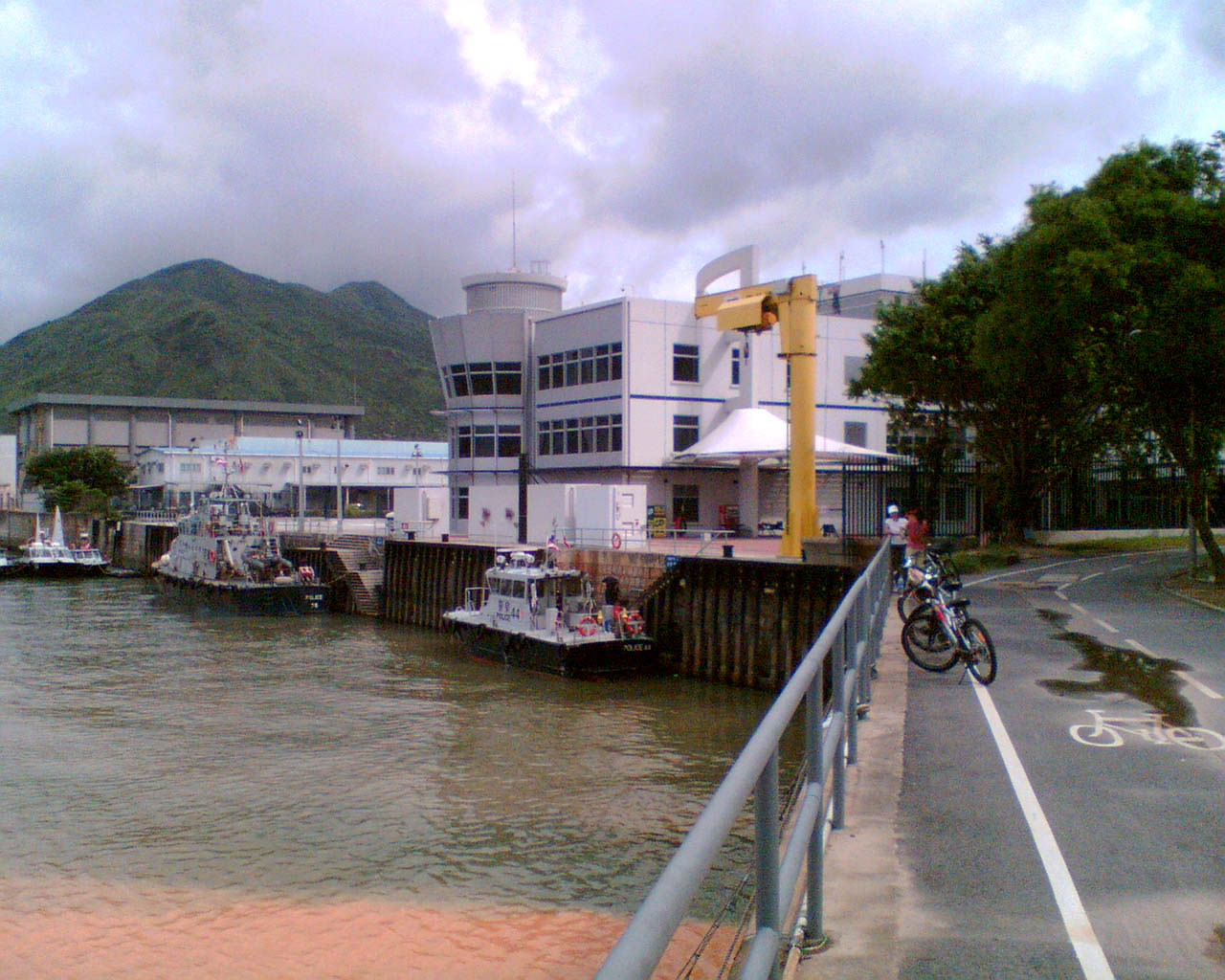
Marine Police North Division.

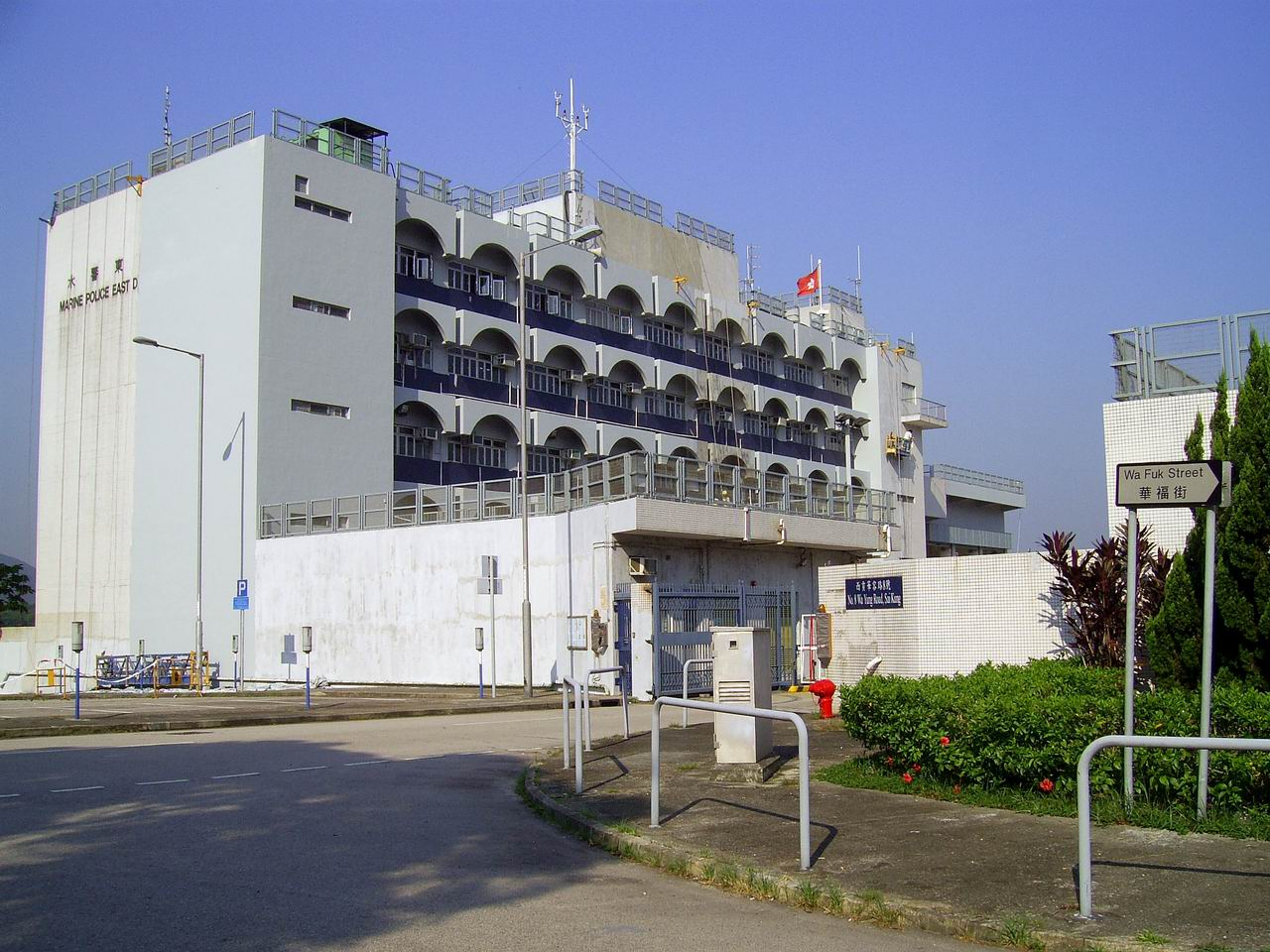
Marine Police East Division.

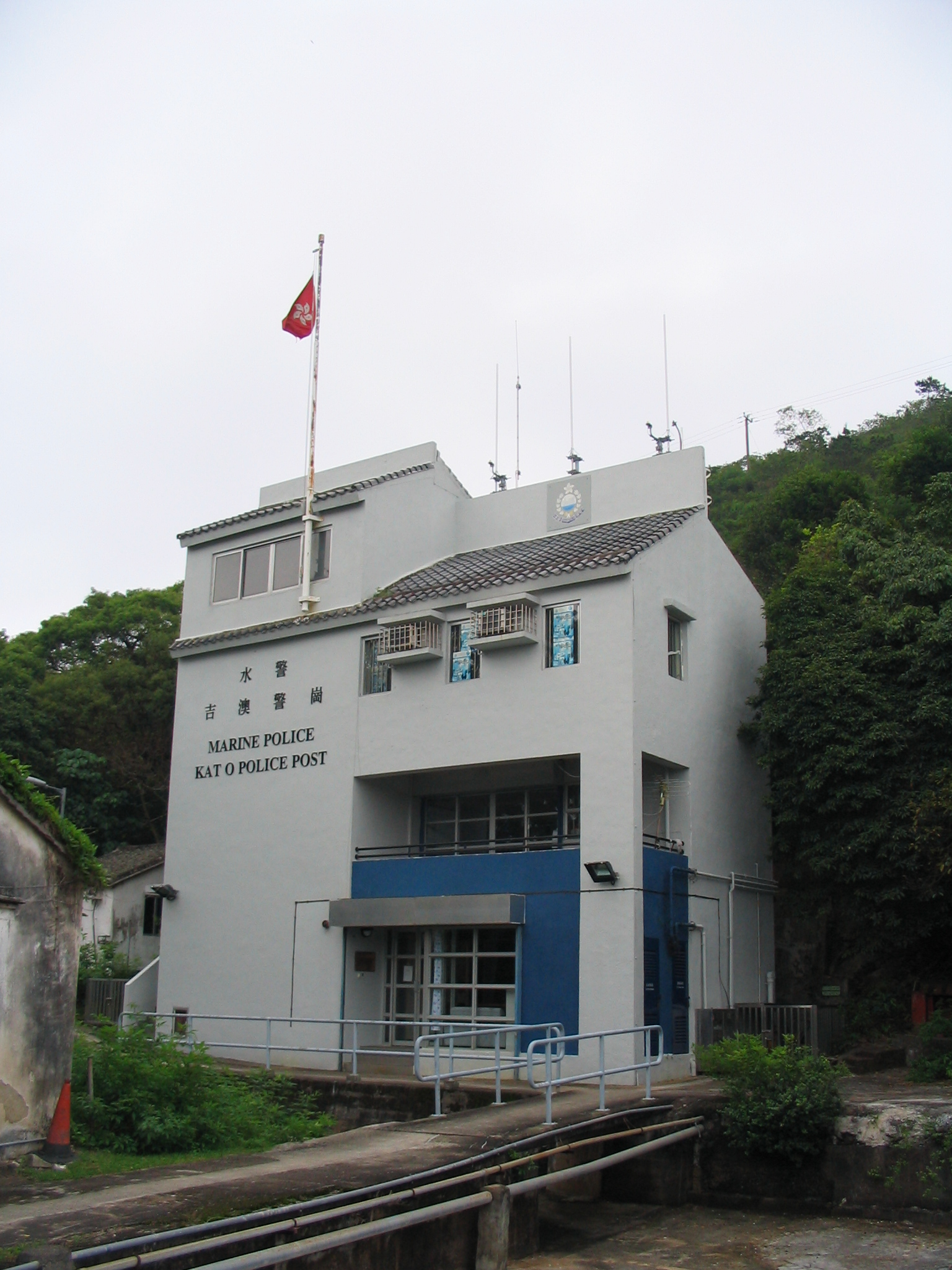
Kat O Police Post.

== Fleet ==
Marine craft

- (Australia) BSC Marine Group patrol vessels
- (Australia) Protector (Pacific Forum) class – 6 small patrol boats
- Hong Kong Shipyards Sea Panther-class large command boat 1988 – 2 large command/training boats
  - replaced Hong Kong United Dockyard Sea Lion class command boats 1965 – 2 (retired 1993)
- (Netherlands) Damen Stan Mk I patrol boats 1980–1981 – 10 built by Chung Wah Shipyard 1990s
- (Netherlands) Damen Stan Mk III patrol boats 1984–1985 – 16 built by Chung Wah Shipyard 1990s
- (Netherlands) Damen Stan 2600 patrol boats
- (New Zealand) HamiltonJet 13m Aluminium patrol boats
- (Australia) ASC Keka Class 30-metre patrol launches 2000 – six built by Cheoy Lee Shipyard
  - replaced six Damen Class Mk1 patrol launches
- Rigid inflatable hull vessels
- Tai Fei – fast patrol vessels
- speed boats

=== Historic ===
- 22' Police Launch 1970 – 11
- 30' Fairey Marine Spear Class patrol boat 1981 – 9
- 40' Jetstream Class patrol craft 1971 – 3
- 45' converted tugs pre-1995 – 8
- 45' converted tugs pre-1975 – 2
- Islander Class patrol craft 1960 – 1
- Hong Kong United Dockyard Sea Rover Class patrol craft 1955 – 6
- Pacific Forum Class Patrol boat 1993 – 6
- 78' Vosper Thornycroft coastal patrol craft 1972–73 – 7 (retired 1993)
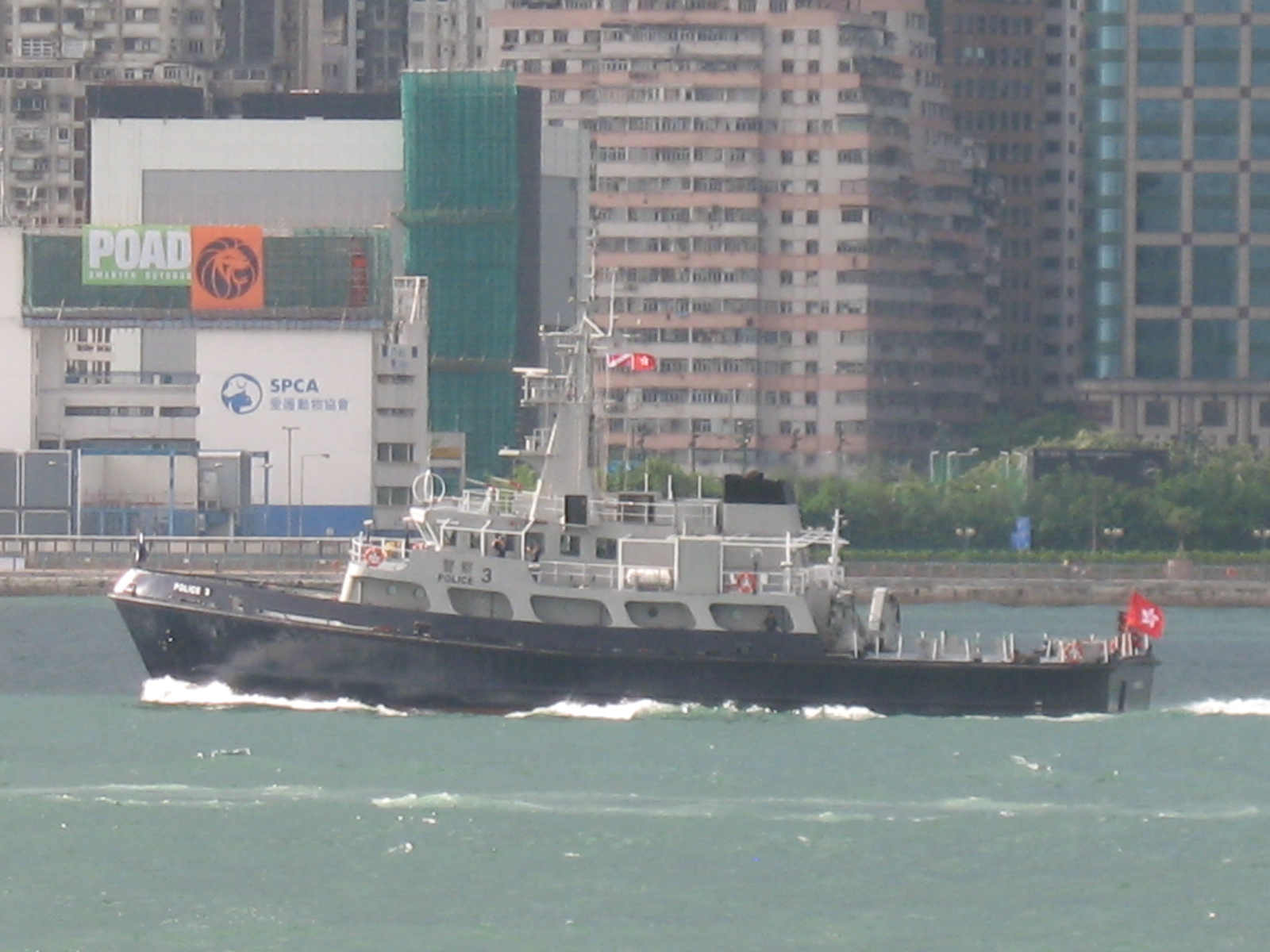
Police Launch 3 (Sea Panther Class).

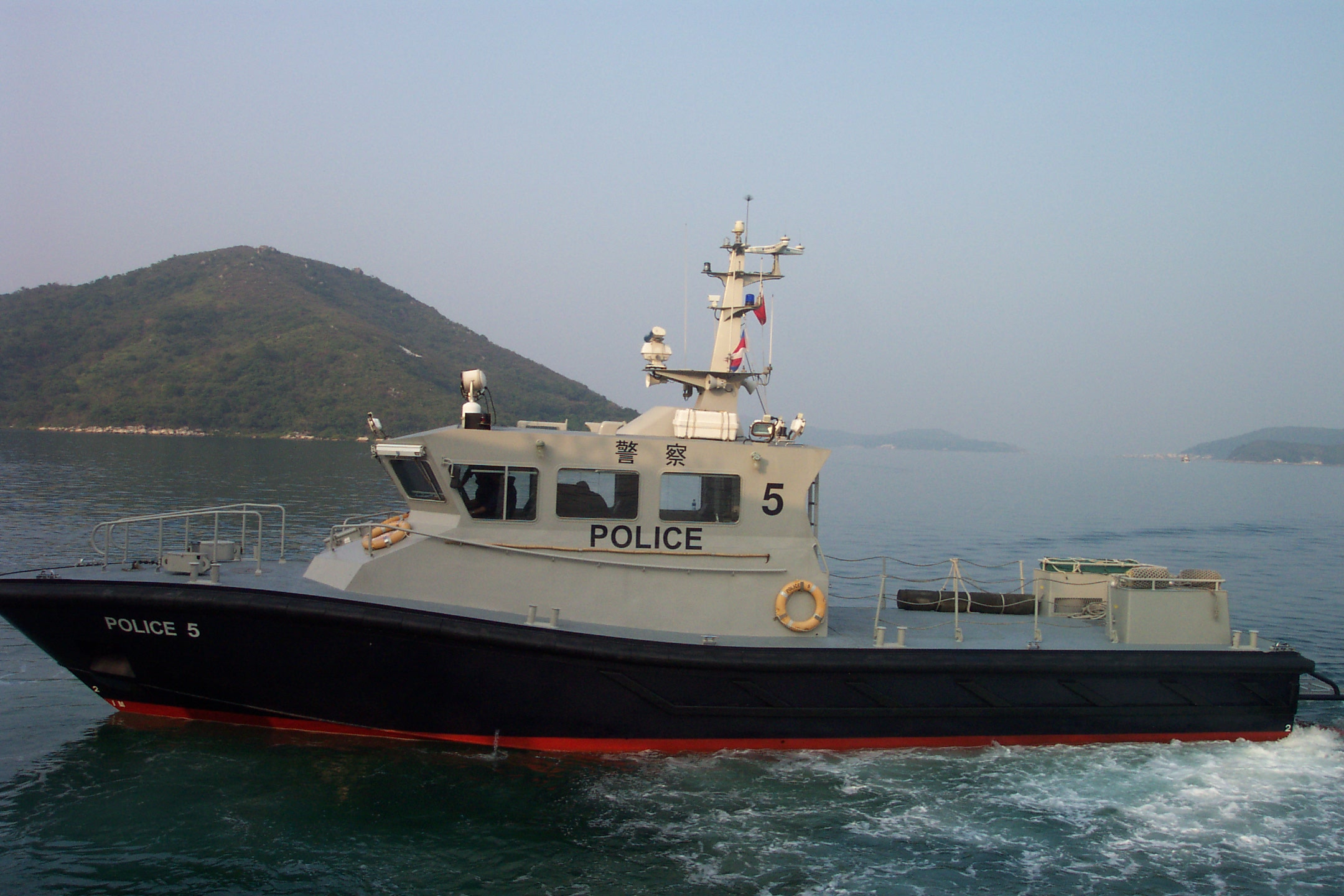
Police Launch 5 which started to service in 2007 (Damen Stan).

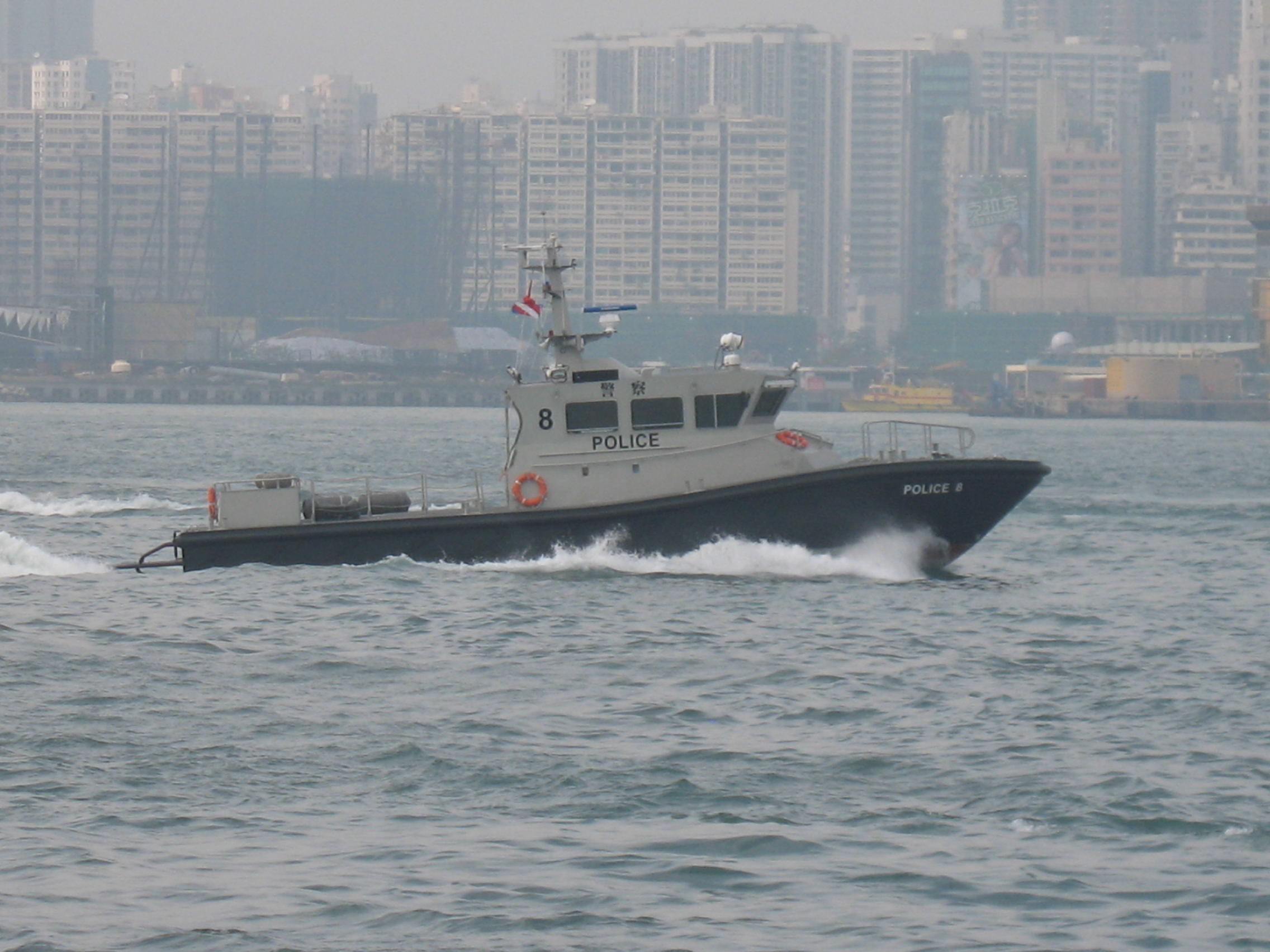
Police Launch 8.

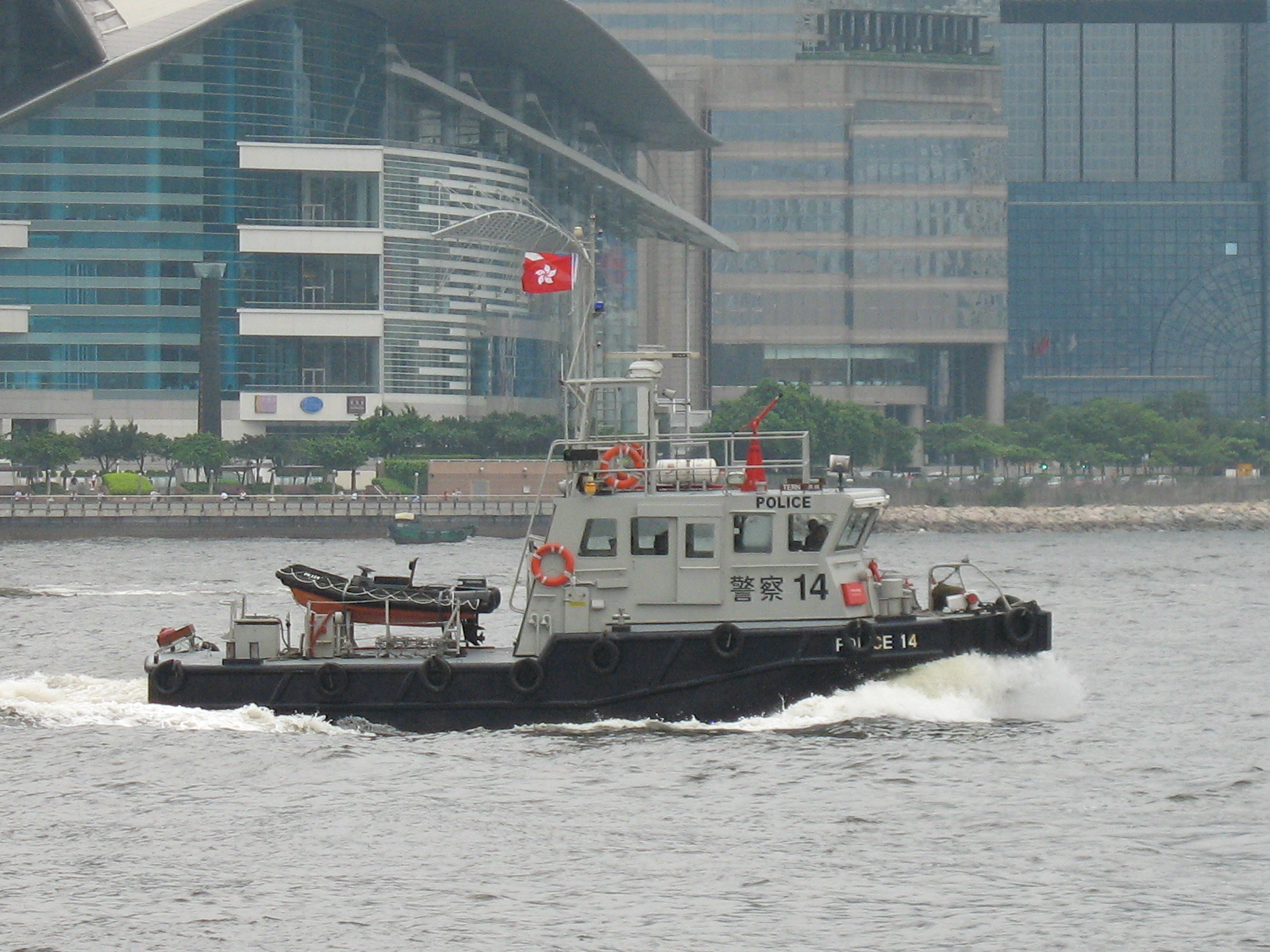
Police Launch 14.

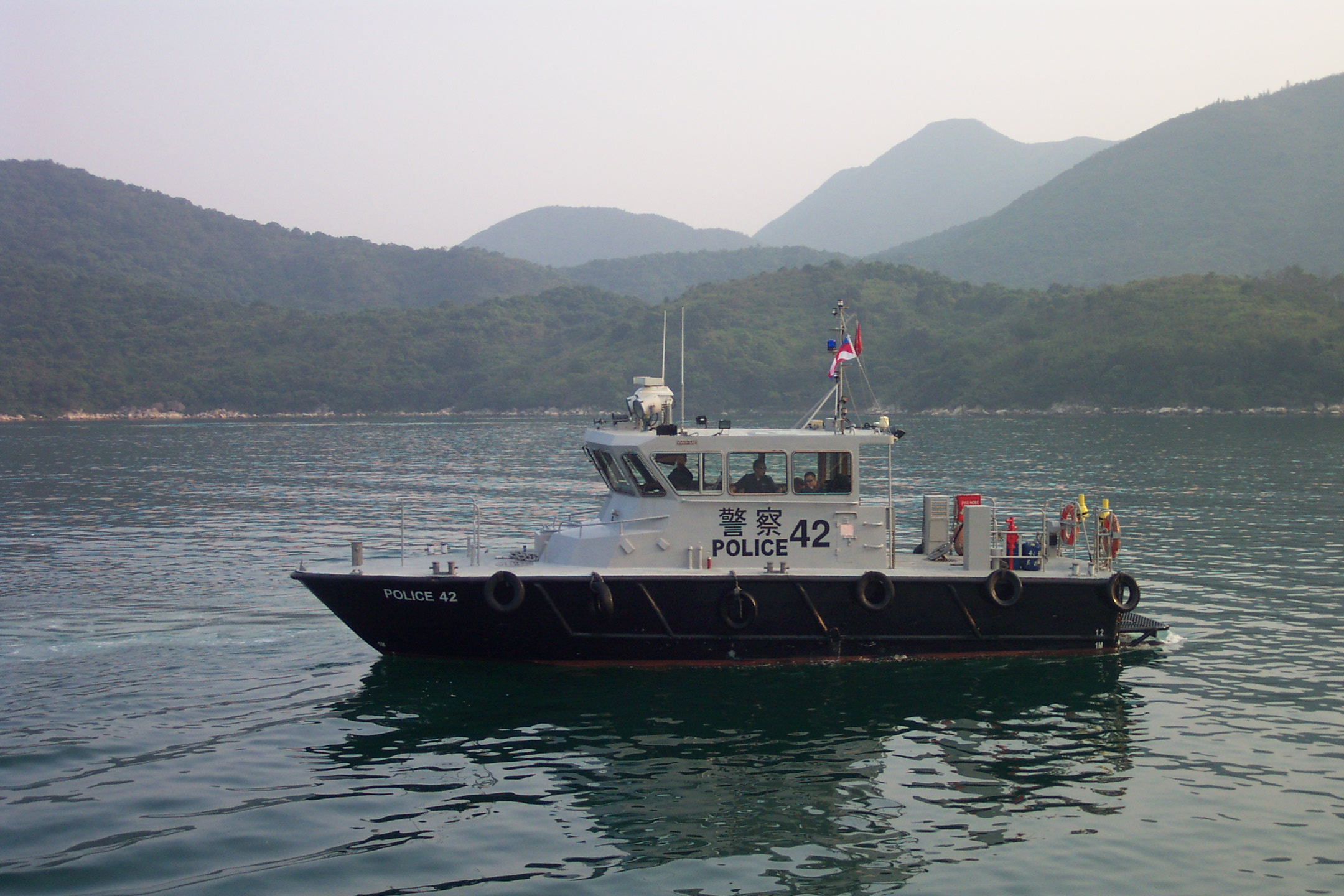
Police Launch 42.

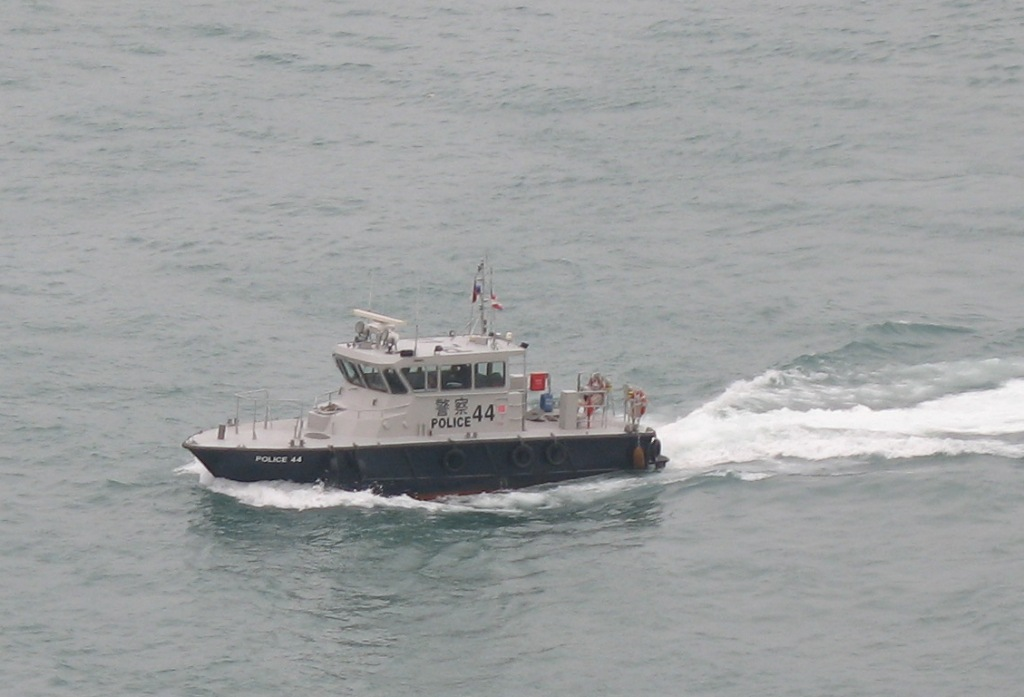
Police Launch 44.

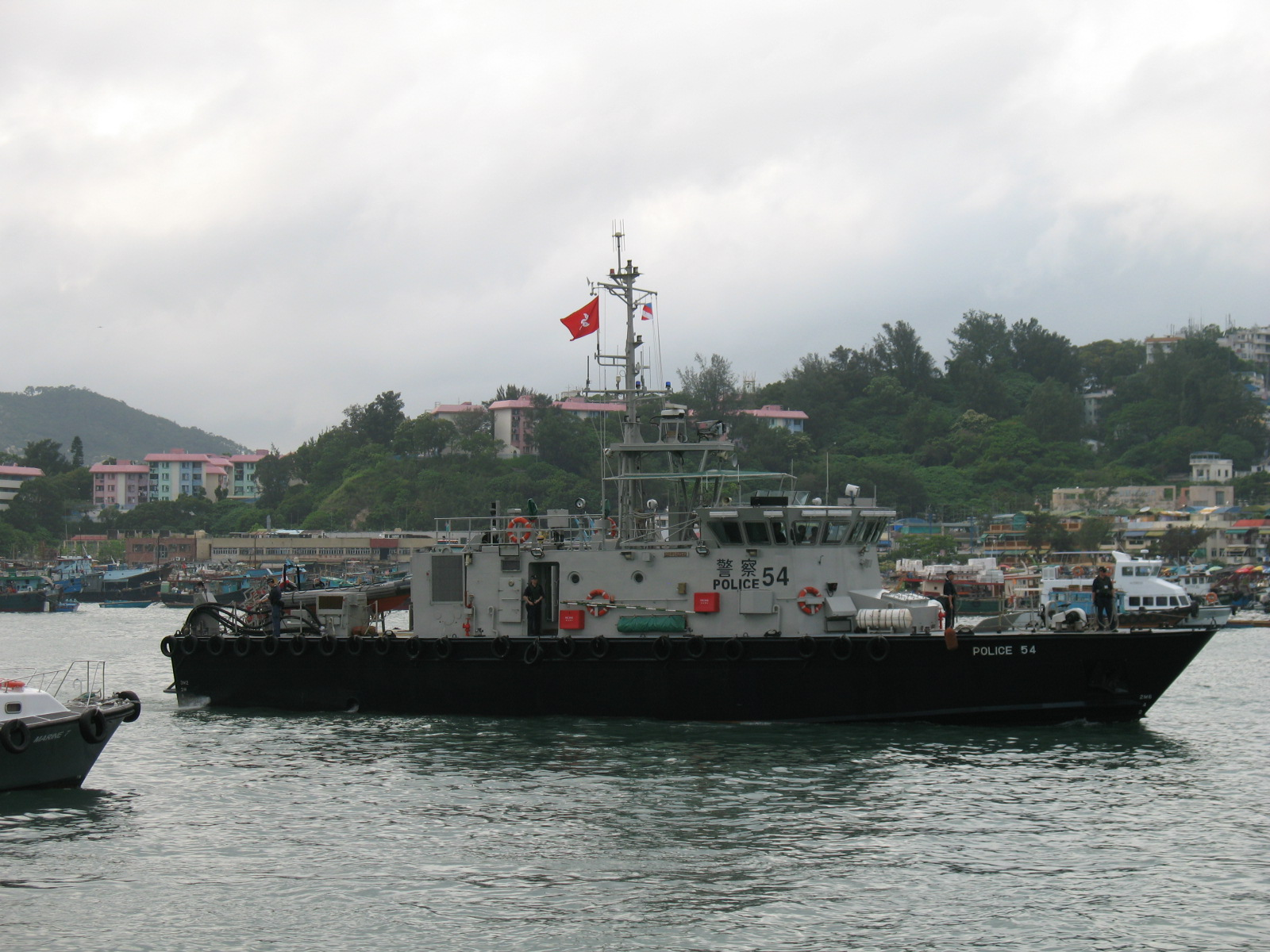
Police Launch 54 (Protector Class).

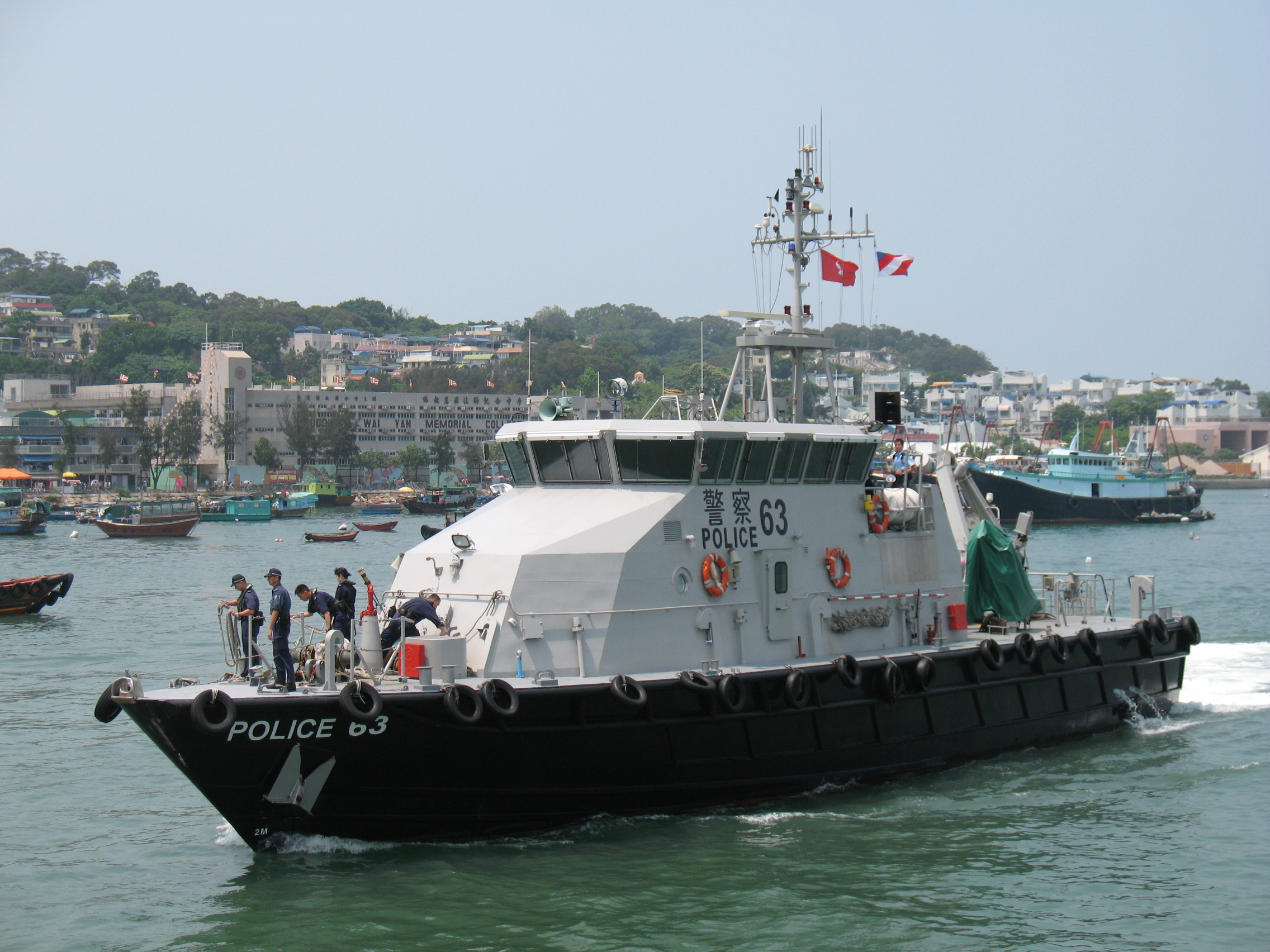
Police Launch 63 (Keka Class).

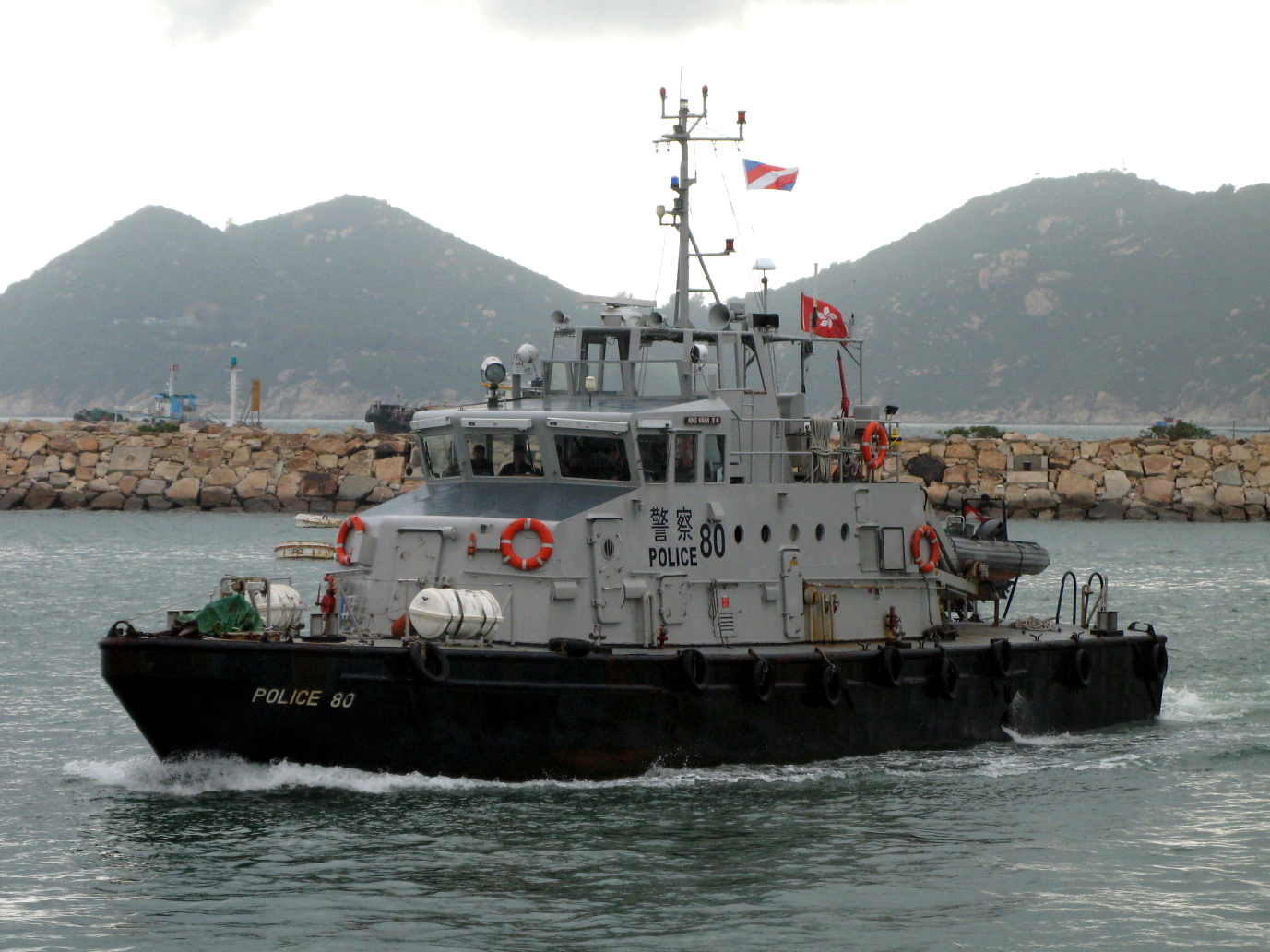
Police Launch 80.

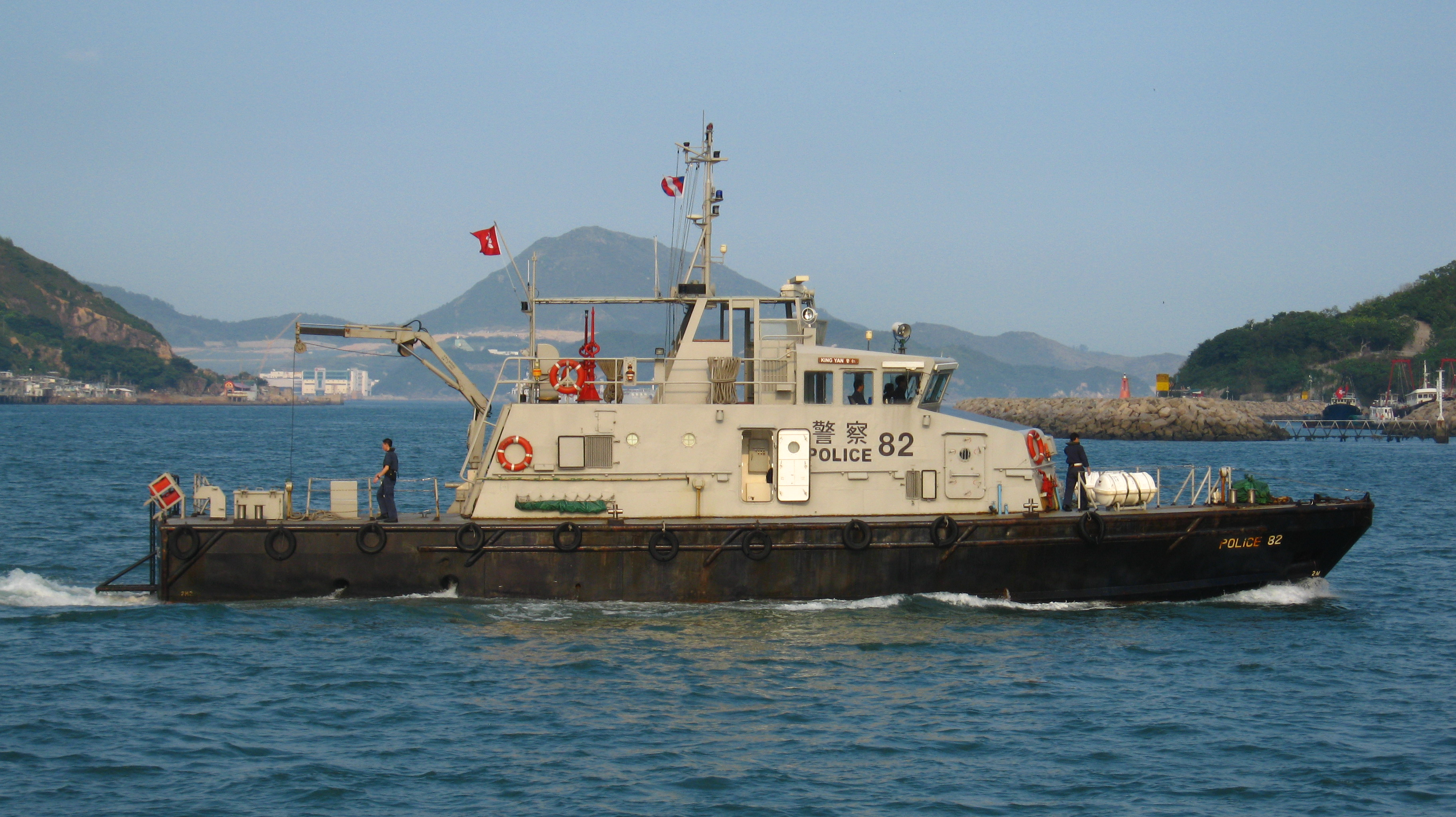
Police Launch 82.

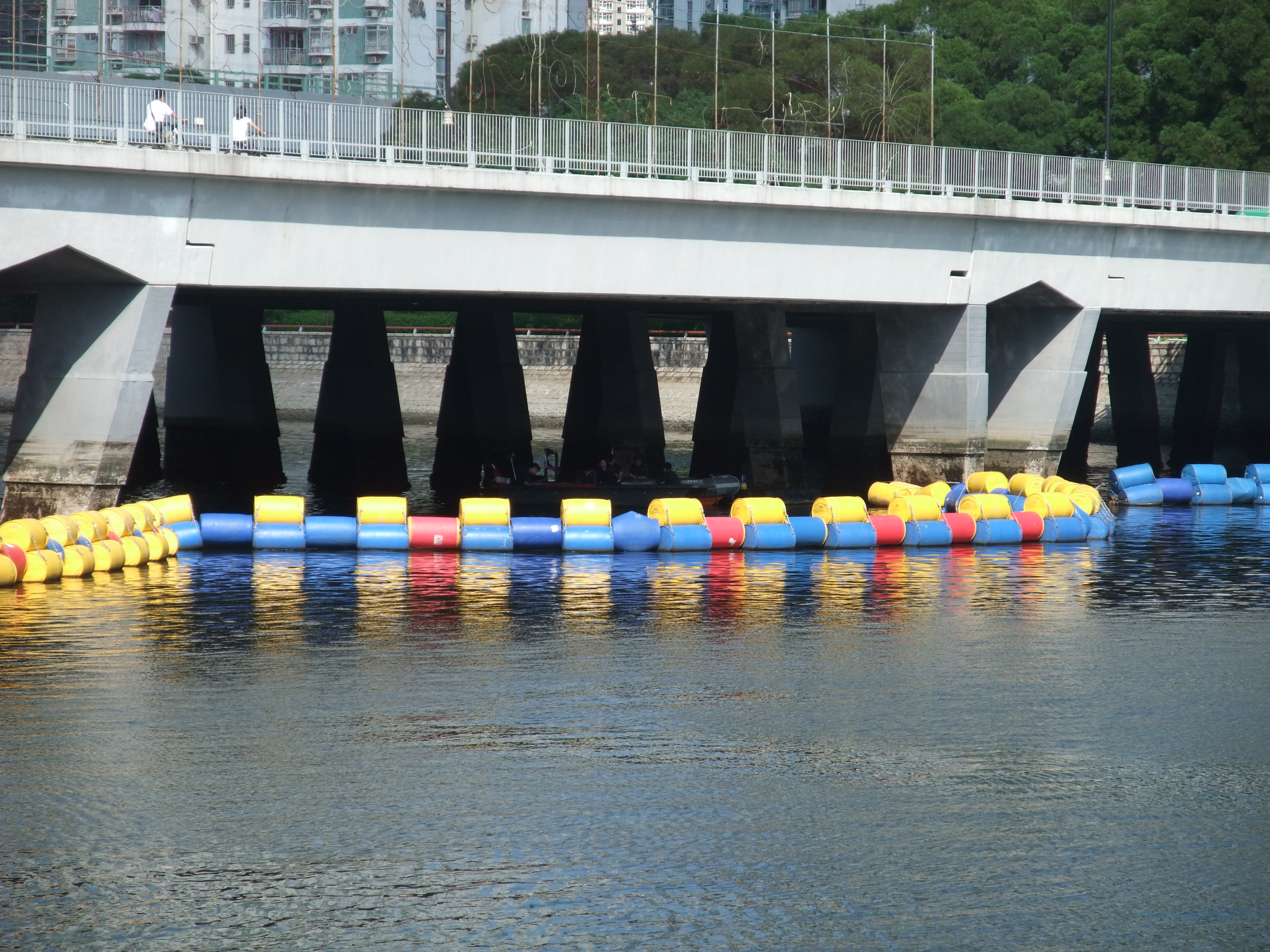
Marine Police set up a block in Shing Mun River Channel under the Banyan Bridge during the 2008 Summer Olympics.

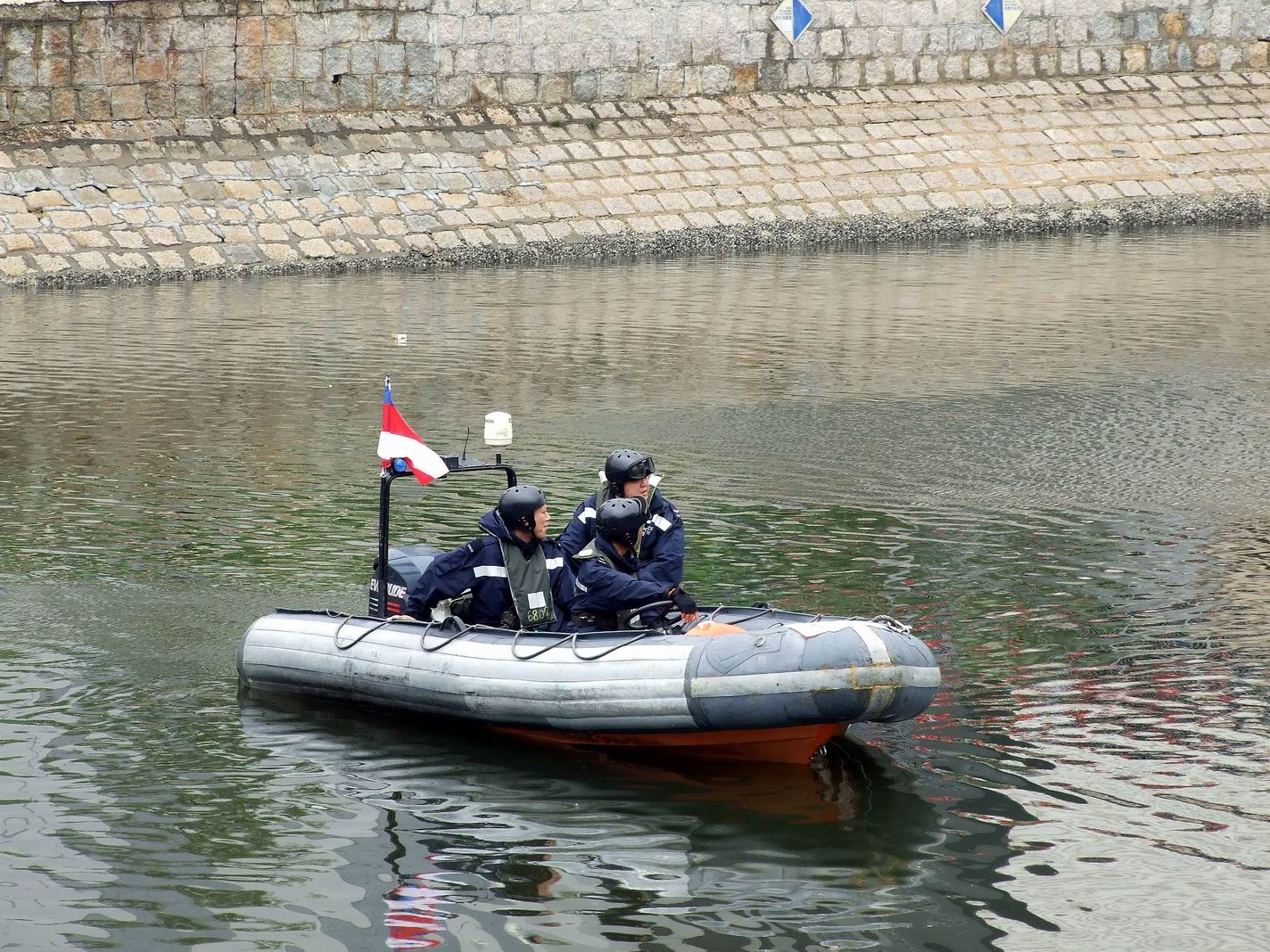
Marine Police patrol the Shing Mun River Channel during the 2008 Summer Olympics torch relay.

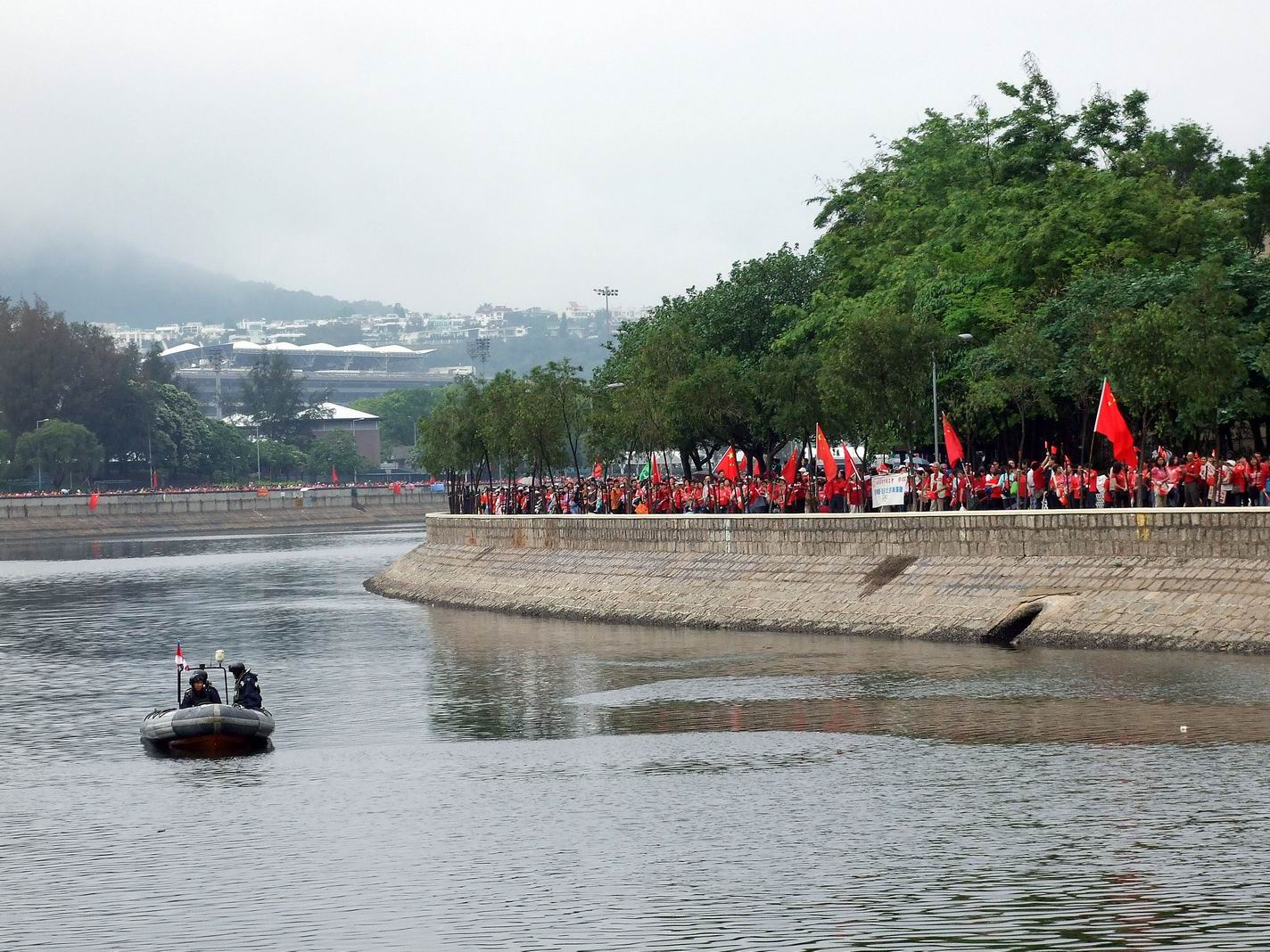
Marine Police patrol the Shing Mun River Channel during the 2008 Summer Olympics torch relay.

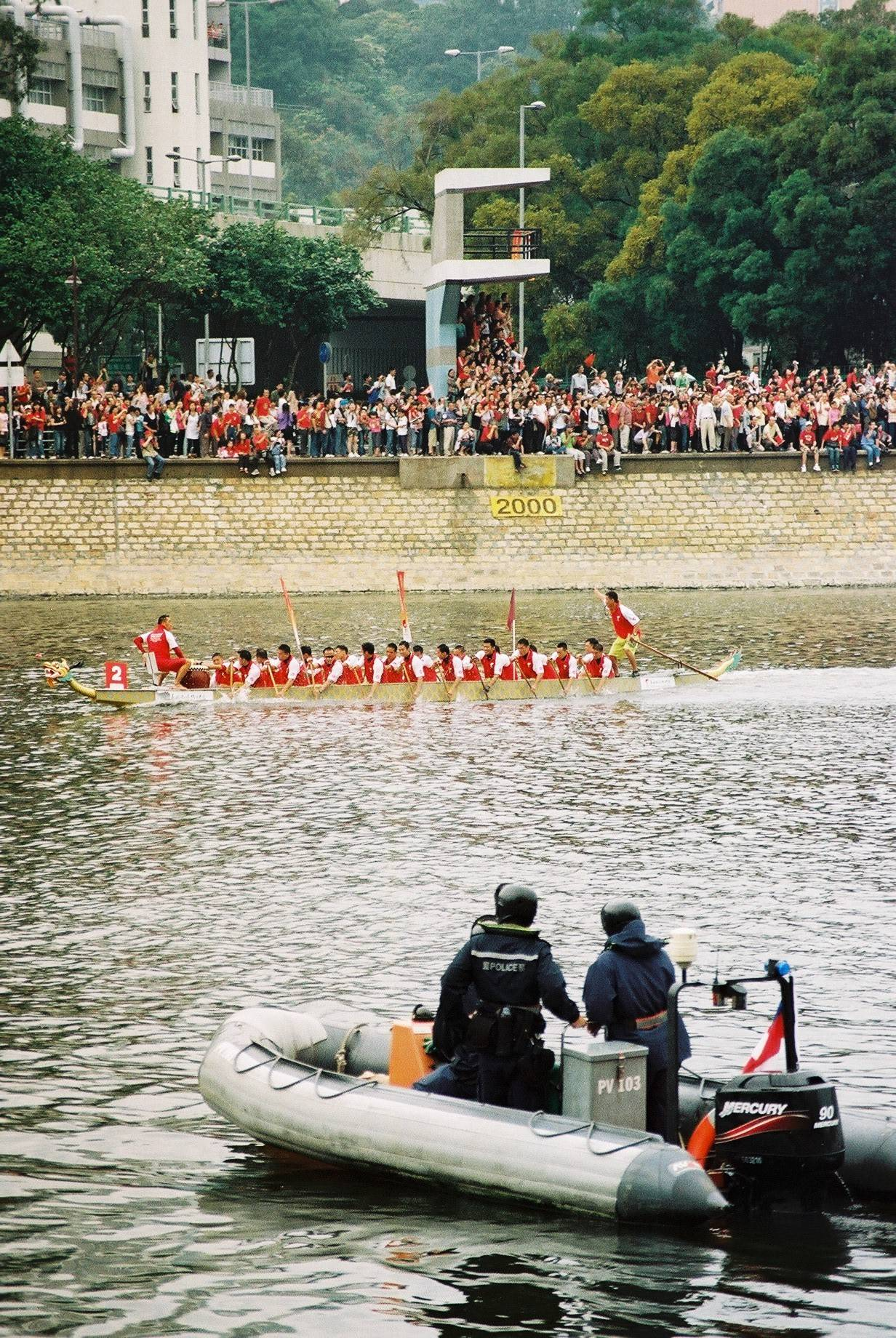
Marine Police supervises the dragonboat races in Shing Mun River Channel, Sha Tin.

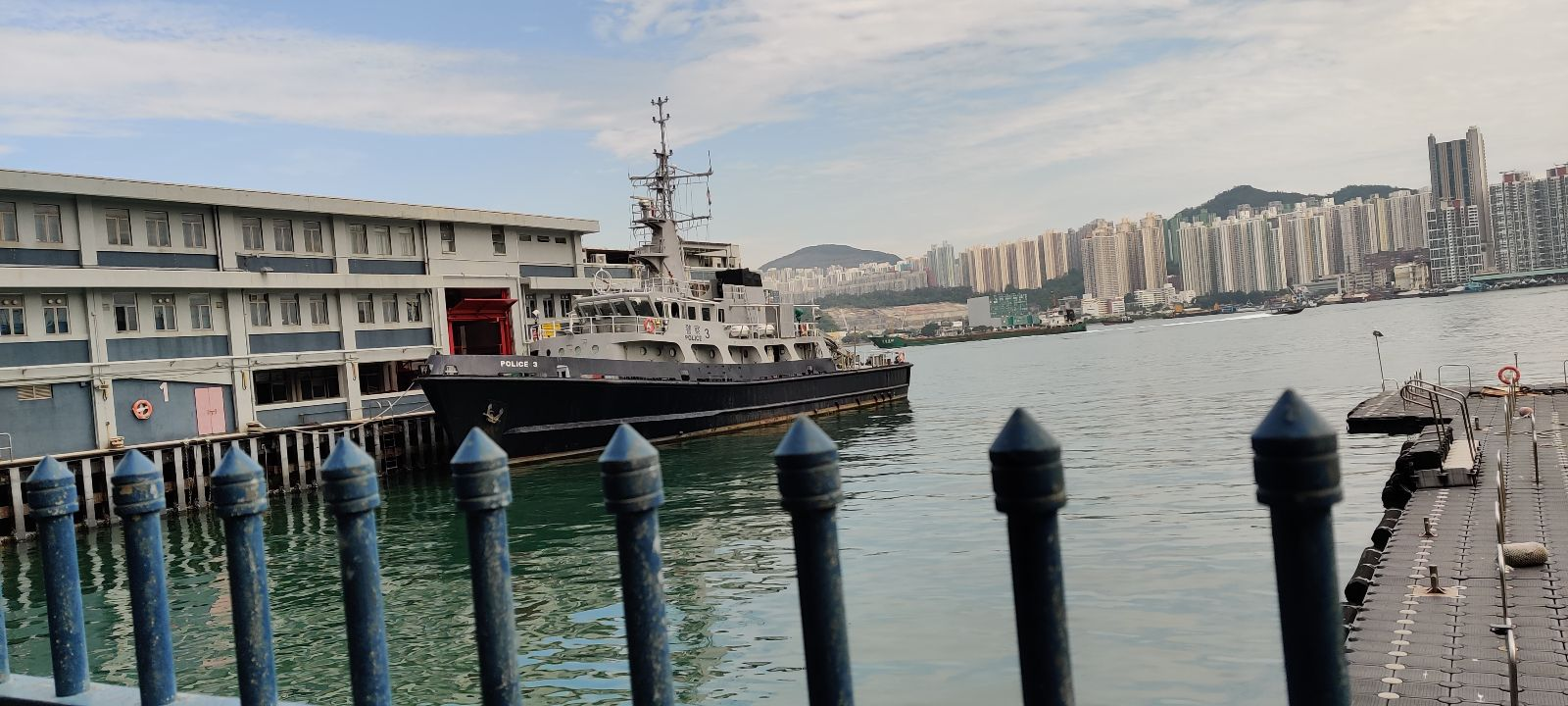
Police Launch 3 Sea panther in Marine police headquarters

== Firearms ==
- Smith & Wesson Model 10- Standard issue sidearm for Marine Region (except Small Boat Division), 6 shot .38 revolver.
- Glock 17- Standard issue pistol for Small Boat Division, loaded with 17 round of 9mm Parabellum magazines
- Federal Model 201-Z Riot Gun – Standard issue anti-riot gun, loaded with less-than-lethal CS rounds.
- Heckler & Koch MP5- Standard issue SMG, loaded with 30 round of 9mm Parabellum magazines
- SIG 516 - Standard issue assault rifle for Small Boat Division. Loaded with 30 rounds of 5.56×45mm NATO magazines.

== Fallen Officers ==
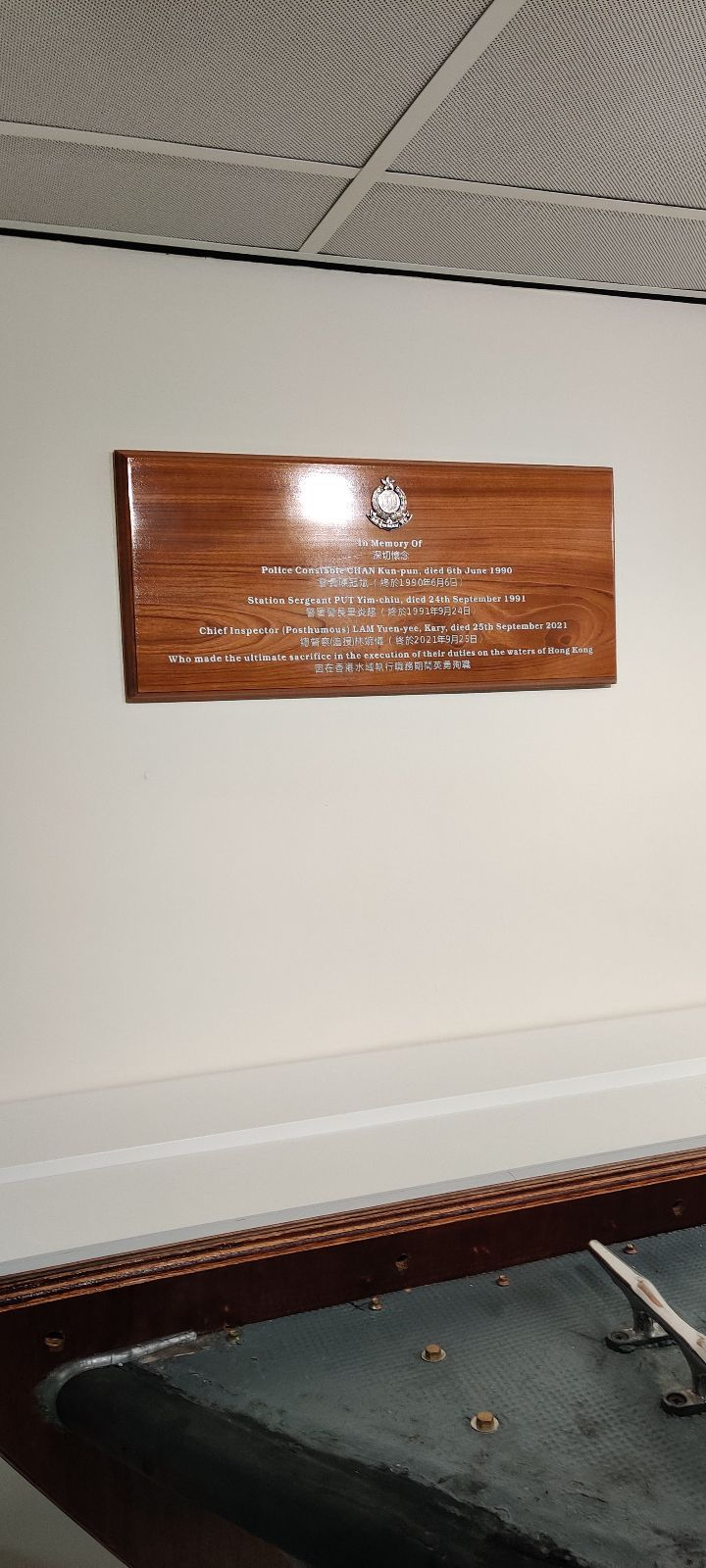
A plague listing at the Marine Police regional headquarters listing all line of duty deaths in the marine police

As of 2024, 3 marine police officers have been killed in the line of duty.

== See also ==
- Special Duties Unit
- Marine Department (Hong Kong)
- Fire Services Department
- Customs and Excise Department (Hong Kong)
- Immigration Department
- Government Flying Service
- Water police
- Coast Guard
