= Hud =

Hud, hud, or HUD may refer to:

== Entertainment ==
- Hud (1963 film), a 1963 film starring Paul Newman
- Hud (1986 film), a 1986 Norwegian film
- HUD (TV program), or Heads Up Daily, a Canadian e-sports television program

== Places ==
- Hud, Fars, Iran
- Hud, Kohgiluyeh and Boyer-Ahmad, Iran
- Hongkong United Dockyards, a dockyard in Hong Kong

== Acronym ==
- Head-up display, a visual display technology for airplanes, cars and others
  - HUD (video games), a method of visually representing information in video games
- United States Department of Housing and Urban Development, a division of the U.S. federal government
- Hubble Ultra-Deep Field

== Other uses ==
- Hud (prophet), an Islamic prophet whom some identify with Eber
- Hud (sūrah), the eleventh chapter of the Qur'an, which contains an account of the prophet Hud
- HuD (protein), a human gene, an RNA-binding protein
- nickname of Haydn Hud Rickit (born 1951), New Zealand former rugby union player
- HUD, IATA airport code of Humboldt Municipal Airport (Iowa)
