= Keka-class patrol boat =

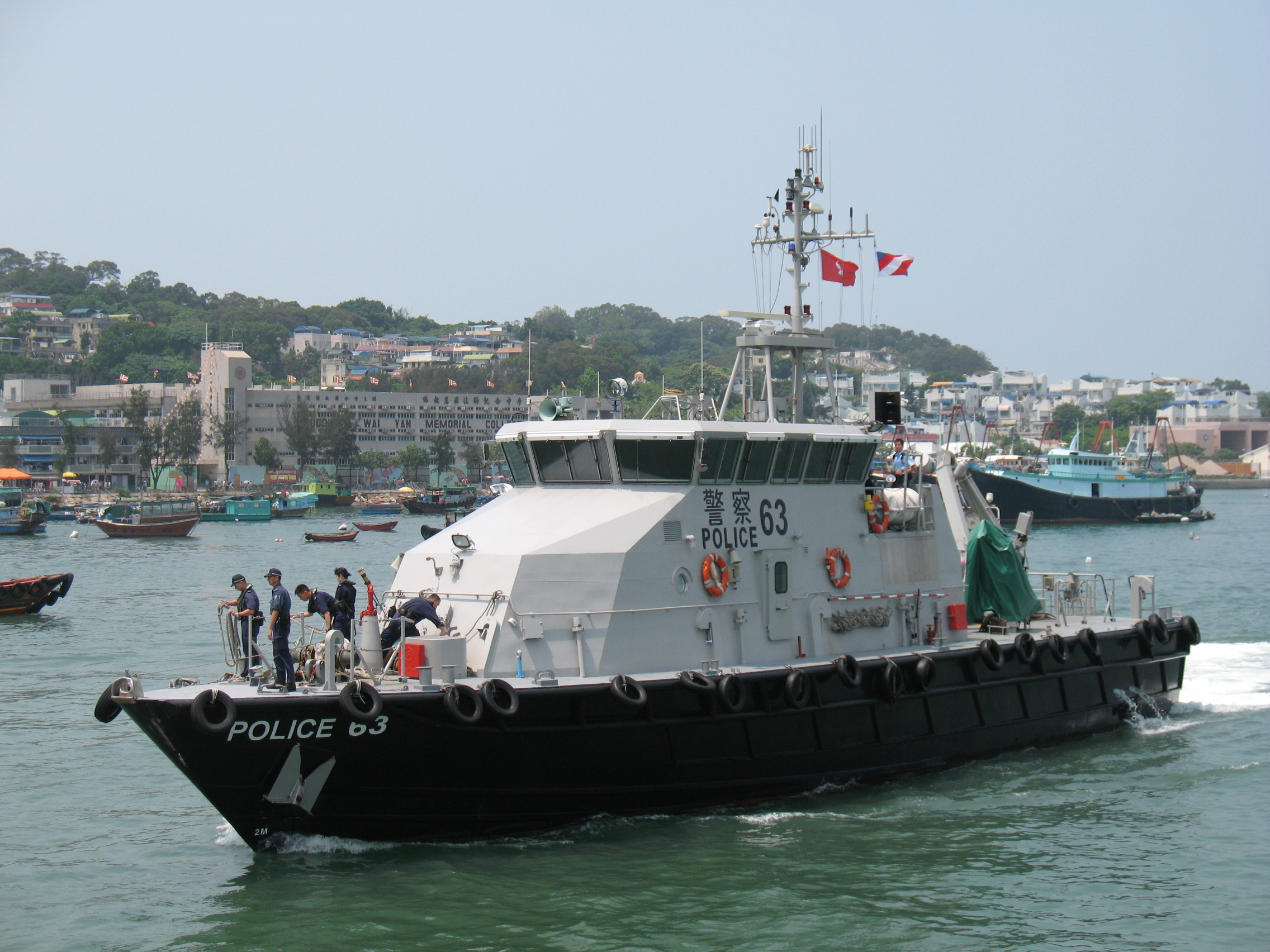
- Patrol Launch 63 entering the Cheung Chau Typhoon Shelter in 2008

Class overview
- Name: Keka-class patrol boat
- Builders: Cheoy Lee Shipyard, Ltd, Hong Kong
- Operators: Hong Kong Police
- Preceded by: Damen Mk1
- Built: 2000–2005
- In commission: 2002–2005
- Completed: 6
- Active: 6

General characteristics
- Type: Coastal patrol boat
- Displacement: 110 tonnes
- Length: 31 m (102 ft)
- Draught: 1.8 m (5.9 ft)
- Propulsion: CODAD: 1 MTU 8V2000M60 loiter diesel, 1 waterjet, 400 kilowatts (540 bhp); 2 MTU 12V396TE84 main diesels, 2 shafts, 1,500 kilowatts (2,000 bhp);
- Speed: 27 knots (50 km/h; 31 mph)
- Range: 1,500 nmi (2,800 km; 1,700 mi)
- Complement: 13

The Keka-class patrol boats are vessels designed by ASC Pty. Ltd. (formerly named Australian Submarine Corporation) originally for the Royal Thai Navy (3 vessels). A second variant series was designed for the Hong Kong Marine Police (6 vessels).

== Royal Thai Navy ==
Australian company ASC and Thai company Silkline International formed a joint venture to build three Keka-class patrol boats for the Royal Thai Navy at Silkline's yard at Pak Nam Pran, Prachaub Krirkhan, Thailand.

=== Series T.81 ===
The Keka-class vessels for the Royal Thai Navy are designated as the T.81 Series and have the following characteristics:

- Displacement: normal load 95 tonnes; full load 110 tonnes
- Armament: 40/60 Bofors; Oerlikon GAM-C01 20 mm, 2 x 0.50" machine gun
- Main Engines: 2 x MTU 16V2000 TE90
- Radar: Anritsu

== Hong Kong Marine Police ==
The Hong Kong Marine Police had a programme to replace 35 patrol boats that had previously been delivered between 1980 and 1992. The first to be replaced were the Damen Mk I class for which the ASC designed Keka class was chosen. They were built by Cheoy Lee Shipyards in Hong Kong and in their yard in mainland China between 2000 and 2005. They were ordered in two batches of two and four boats.

== Vessels ==
Ship	Delivery	Builder	Owner	Comments
Thailand
T.81	4 August 1999	ASC / Silkline JV	Royal Thai Navy	
T.82	9 December 1999	ASC / Silkline JV	Royal Thai Navy	
T.83	27 October 2000	ASC / Silkline JV	Royal Thai Navy	
Hong Kong
PL60	October 2002	Cheoy Lee Shipyard	Hong Kong Marine Police	Per HKMP press release
PL61	October 2002	Cheoy Lee Shipyard	Hong Kong Marine Police	
PL62	5 May 2004	Cheoy Lee Shipyard	Hong Kong Marine Police	Per HKMP press release
PL63	5 May 2004	Cheoy Lee Shipyard	Hong Kong Marine Police	
PL64	2005	Cheoy Lee Shipyard	Hong Kong Marine Police	Delivery date assumed from reference.
PL65	2005	Cheoy Lee Shipyard	Hong Kong Marine Police	
