= Prachuap Khiri Khan =

Prachuap Khiri Khan ประจวบคีรีขันธ์
- Town
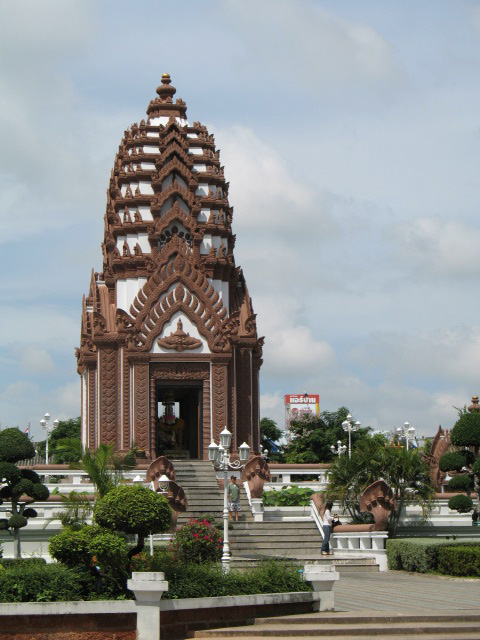
- Prachuap Khiri Khan pillar shrine
- Nickname: Mueang Sam Ao (Thai: เมืองสามอ่าว) (lit. The City of Three Bays)
- Location within Thailand
- Coordinates: 11°49′N 99°48′E
- Country: Thailand
- Provinces: Prachuap Khiri Khan Province
- Amphoe: Mueang Prachuap Khiri Khan District
- Elevation: 9 m (30 ft)

Population (2000)
  - Total: 26,926
- Time zone: UTC+7 (ICT)

Prachuap Khiri Khan (Thai: ประจวบคีรีขันธ์, pronounced [prā.tɕùap kʰīː.rīː kʰǎn]) is a town in western Thailand. It is the capital of Prachuap Khiri Khan Province and is on the coast close to the narrowest stretch in Thailand, only 10 kilometres (6.2 mi) from the border with Myanmar at Dan Sing Khon in the Tenasserim Hills. The area has large pineapple and coconut industries, in addition to being popular with Thai tourists. The town is 291 km south of Bangkok by road.

== Etymology ==
"Prachuap" from the Sanskrit language prācva (प्राच्य), meaning "to meet" or "to join" referring to the province's location where the Malay Peninsula narrows and various regional towns were joined, Khiri (คีรี) from Sanskrit giri meaning "mountain" or "hill", "Khan" (ขันธ์) from the Sanskrit khanda (खण्ड) meaning "group," "cluster," or "section", thus "the hill where vari[o]us sections meet".

== History ==
Prachuap Khiri Khan is home to a Royal Thai Air Force base, and was an invasion point for Japanese troops on 8 December 1941, during World War II. A commemoration is held each December to honour the 38 Thai airmen and civilians who died in the fighting against the Japanese 143rd Infantry Regiment in the Battle of Prachuap Khiri Khan.

On December 5, 2023, a double-decker bus carrying mostly Thai nationals veered off the road and crashed into a tree, which resulted in 14 deaths and 32 injuries.

== Climate ==
Prachuap Khiri Khan has a tropical savanna climate (Köppen climate classification Aw). Seasons are not as distinct as in more northerly parts of Thailand; temperatures are quite similar throughout the year and the dry and wet seasons are not as clearly defined, with appreciable rain falling in all months. However, in general the months from December to April are drier with about 45 millimetres (1.8 in) in each month, while October and November are the wettest months with over 200 millimetres (7.9 in) each. The other months, from May to September, have an intermediate level of rainfall around 100 millimetres (3.9 in).

Climate data for Prachuap Khiri Khan (1991–2020, extremes 1951-present)
Month	Jan	Feb	Mar	Apr	May	Jun	Jul	Aug	Sep	Oct	Nov	Dec	Year
Record high °C (°F)	35.5 (95.9)	37.8 (100.0)	39.4 (102.9)	40.0 (104.0)	39.5 (103.1)	38.7 (101.7)	38.0 (100.4)	37.3 (99.1)	37.3 (99.1)	37.0 (98.6)	36.2 (97.2)	36.0 (96.8)	40.0 (104.0)
Mean daily maximum °C (°F)	31.2 (88.2)	32.2 (90.0)	33.3 (91.9)	34.6 (94.3)	34.4 (93.9)	33.4 (92.1)	32.7 (90.9)	32.5 (90.5)	32.8 (91.0)	31.9 (89.4)	31.6 (88.9)	30.9 (87.6)	32.6 (90.7)
Daily mean °C (°F)	25.9 (78.6)	26.9 (80.4)	28.2 (82.8)	29.4 (84.9)	29.2 (84.6)	28.6 (83.5)	28.1 (82.6)	27.9 (82.2)	27.9 (82.2)	27.3 (81.1)	27.0 (80.6)	26.0 (78.8)	27.7 (81.9)
Mean daily minimum °C (°F)	21.2 (70.2)	22.0 (71.6)	23.7 (74.7)	25.1 (77.2)	25.6 (78.1)	25.5 (77.9)	25.0 (77.0)	25.0 (77.0)	24.8 (76.6)	24.0 (75.2)	23.3 (73.9)	21.9 (71.4)	23.9 (75.1)
Record low °C (°F)	10.5 (50.9)	12.2 (54.0)	16.9 (62.4)	21.6 (70.9)	22.4 (72.3)	20.9 (69.6)	21.6 (70.9)	22.0 (71.6)	20.7 (69.3)	17.9 (64.2)	13.0 (55.4)	11.4 (52.5)	10.5 (50.9)
Average precipitation mm (inches)	45.4 (1.79)	21.4 (0.84)	76.9 (3.03)	57.4 (2.26)	113.6 (4.47)	92.8 (3.65)	118.1 (4.65)	99.4 (3.91)	104.1 (4.10)	232.8 (9.17)	127.5 (5.02)	24.4 (0.96)	1,113.8 (43.85)
Average precipitation days (≥ 1.0 mm)	2.6	2.0	3.7	3.8	9.3	10.3	12.5	12.2	9.9	13.4	5.6	2.1	87.4
Average relative humidity (%)	75.1	76.7	77.2	76.7	76.4	76.1	77.1	77.2	77.4	82.0	75.6	70.8	76.5
Mean monthly sunshine hours	229.4	214.7	201.5	201.0	155.0	114.0	117.8	114.7	108.0	145.7	171.0	229.4	2,002.2
Mean daily sunshine hours	7.4	7.6	6.5	6.7	5.0	3.8	3.8	3.7	3.6	4.7	5.7	7.4	5.5
Source 1: World Meteorological Organization
Source 2: Office of Water Management and Hydrology, Royal Irrigation Department (sun 1981–2010)(extremes)

== Transportation ==
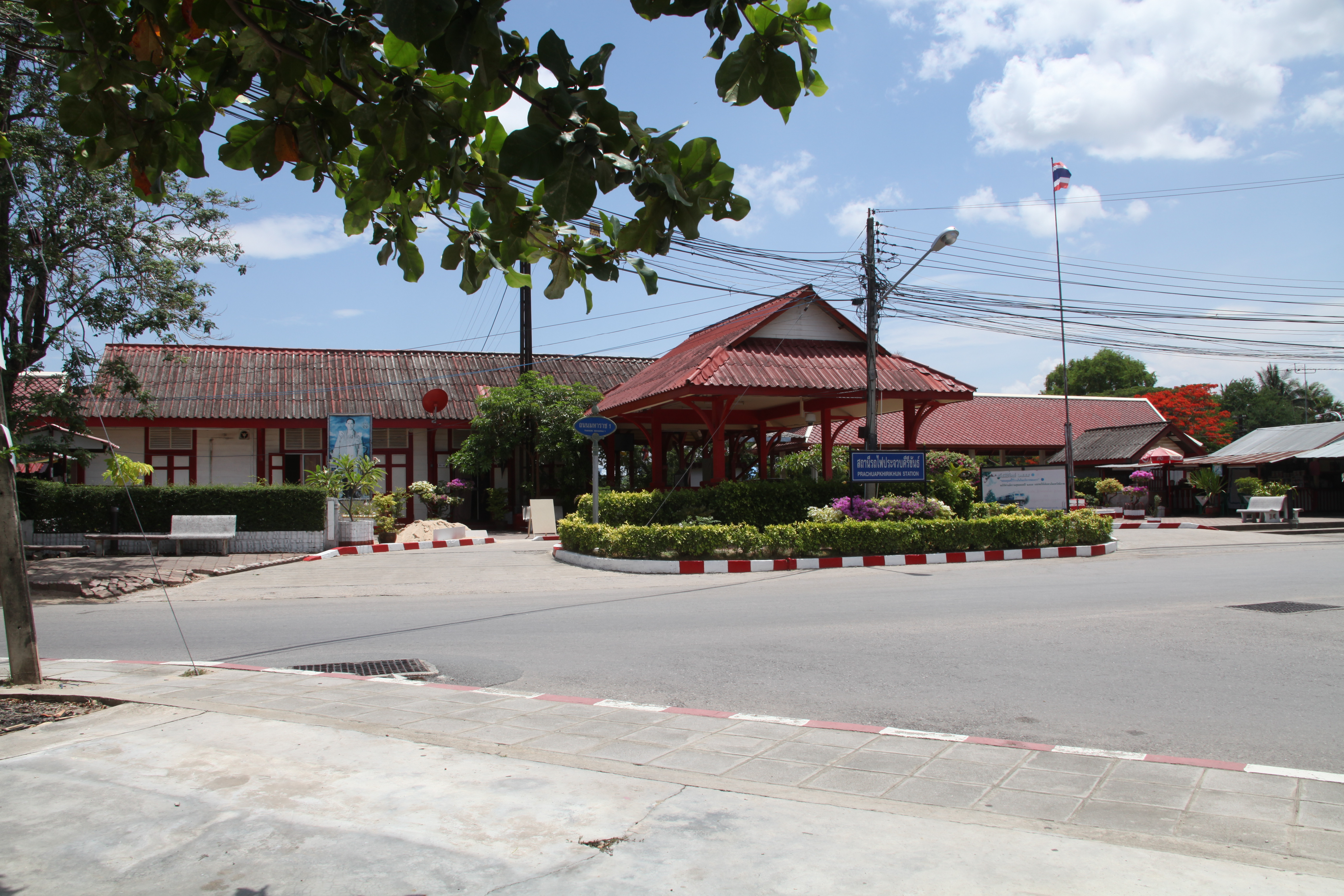
Prachuap Khiri Khan Railway Station

Prachuap Khiri Khan can be reached from Bangkok by train on the Southern Line from Bangkok railway station (Hua Lamphong).

The main road, which runs past the city from north to south, is Route 4 (Phetkasem Road). To the north, this road connects to Phetchaburi, Ratchaburi, Nakhon Pathom and Bangkok; to the south, it connects to Chumphon, Ranong, Phang Nga, Krabi, Trang, Phatthalung and the border with Malaysia near Sadao.

Prachuap Khiri Khan is served by Prachuap Airport, at the south end of town.

== Industry ==
Australian company ASC and Thai company Silkline International formed a joint venture to build three Keka-class patrol boats for the Royal Thai Navy at Silkline's yard at Pak Nam Pran in Prachuap Khiri Khan.

== Gallery ==
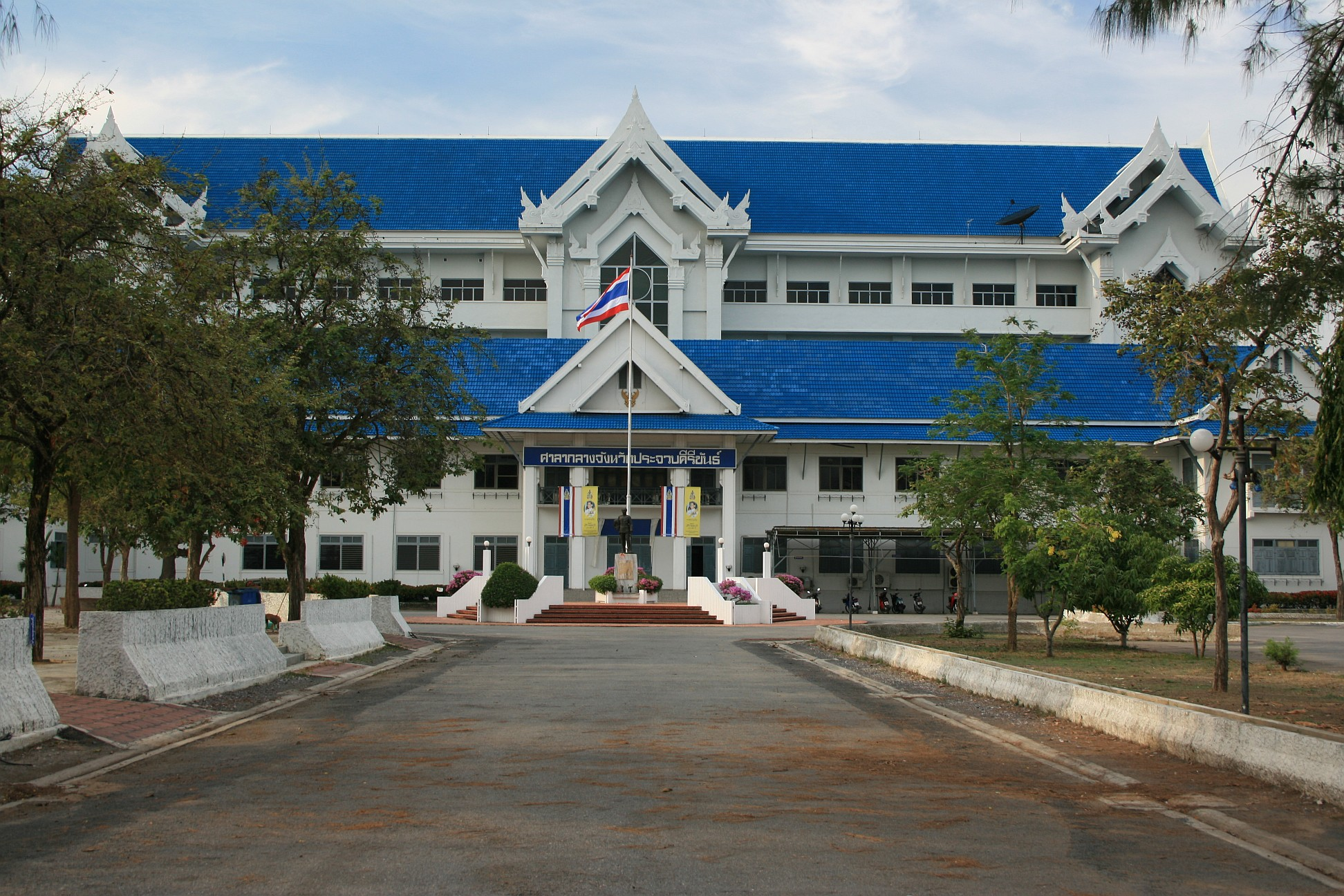
Provincial Hall

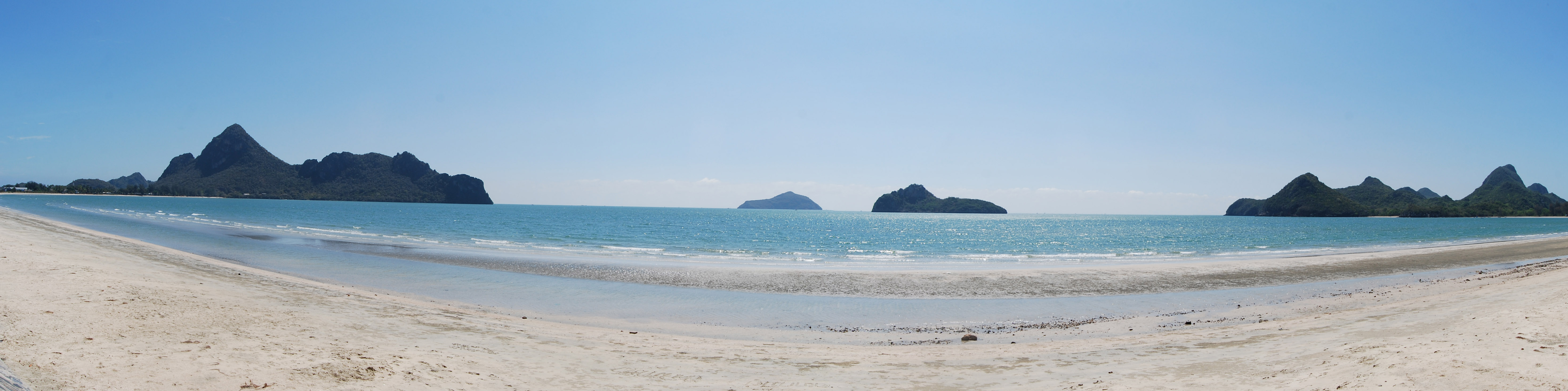
Ao Manao Bay

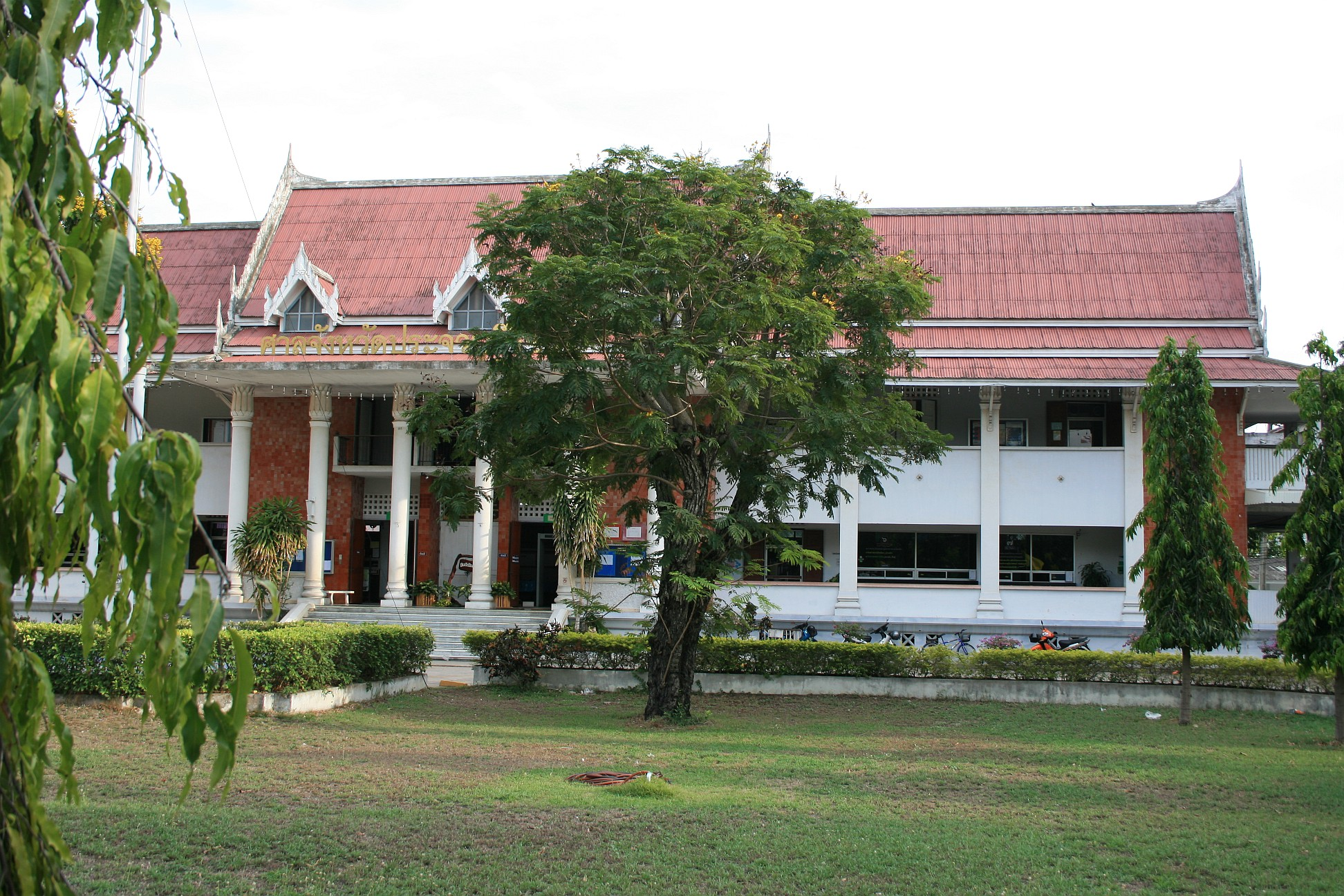
Old Provincial Hall

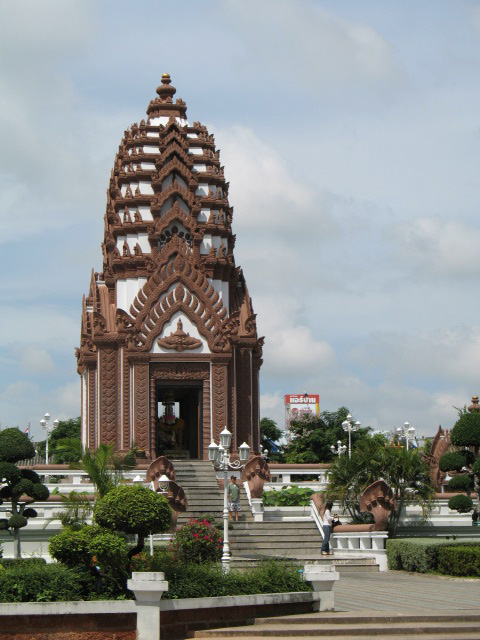
Pillar Shrine

Prachuap Bay at dawn
