= Sea Panther-class command boat =

Hong Kong police vessels

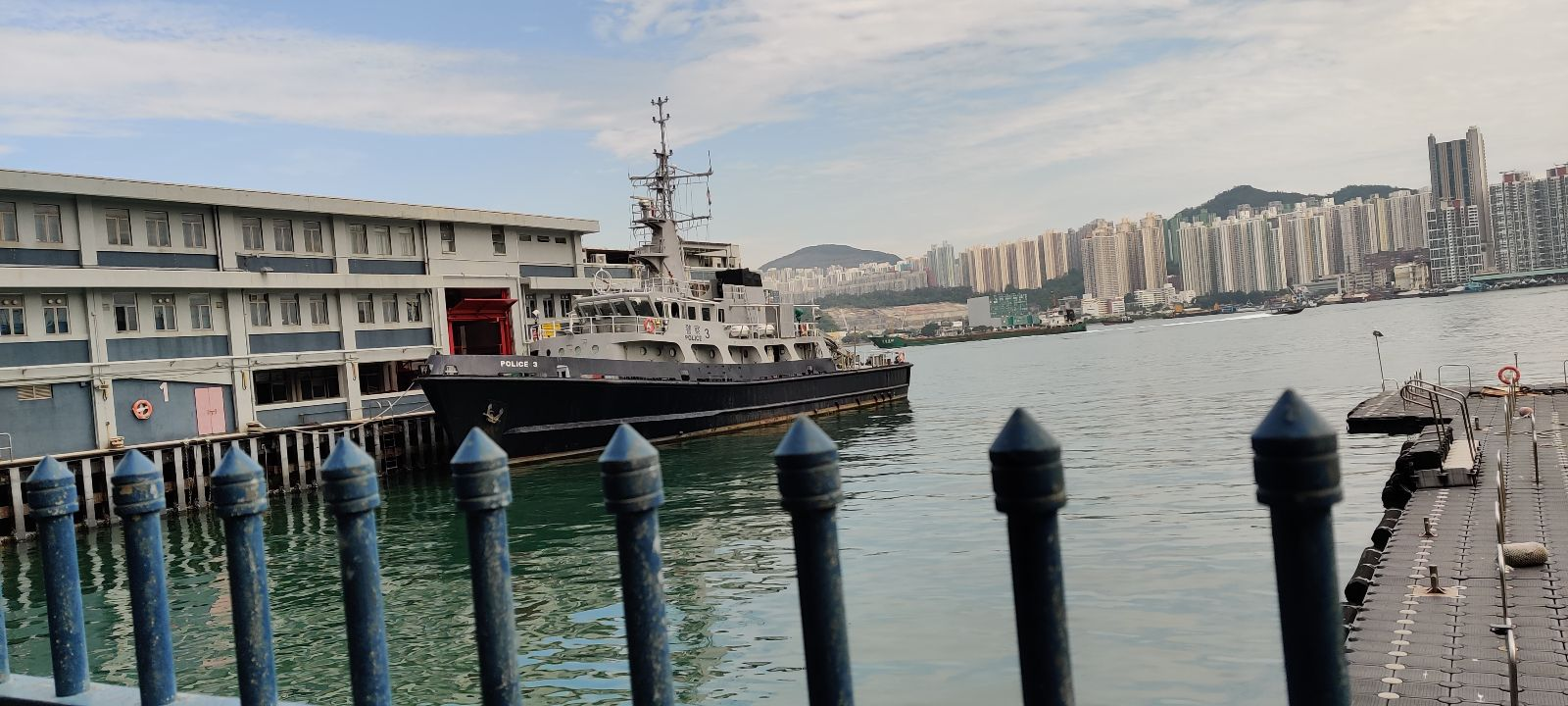
- PL3 Sea Panther in 2024 at the Marine Region headquarters

Class overview
- Name: Sea Panther class large command boat
- Builders: Hong Kong Shipyards
- Operators: Hong Kong Police Force
- Built: 1987-1988
- In commission: 1988
- Completed: 2
- Active: 2

General characteristics
- Type: Command Boat; Training Ship
- Displacement: 450 tons
- Length: 40 m (130 ft)
- Beam: 8.5 m (28 ft)
- Propulsion: 2 Cat diesels, 2 shafts, 2,350 bhp, 14 knots hp
- Complement: 27-33
- Armament: Originally two 12.7 mm machine guns, now removed

Sea Panther-class large command boats are vessels built for and used by the Hong Kong Police Force for marine patrols off Hong Kong. Commissioned in 1988, two boats were built:

- PL3 Sea Panther
- PL4 Sea Horse

The Sea Panther class is the largest ship class of the Hong Kong Marine Police. Due to its old age it is mostly used for training purposes.
