= Hudd =

Funeral related shelter

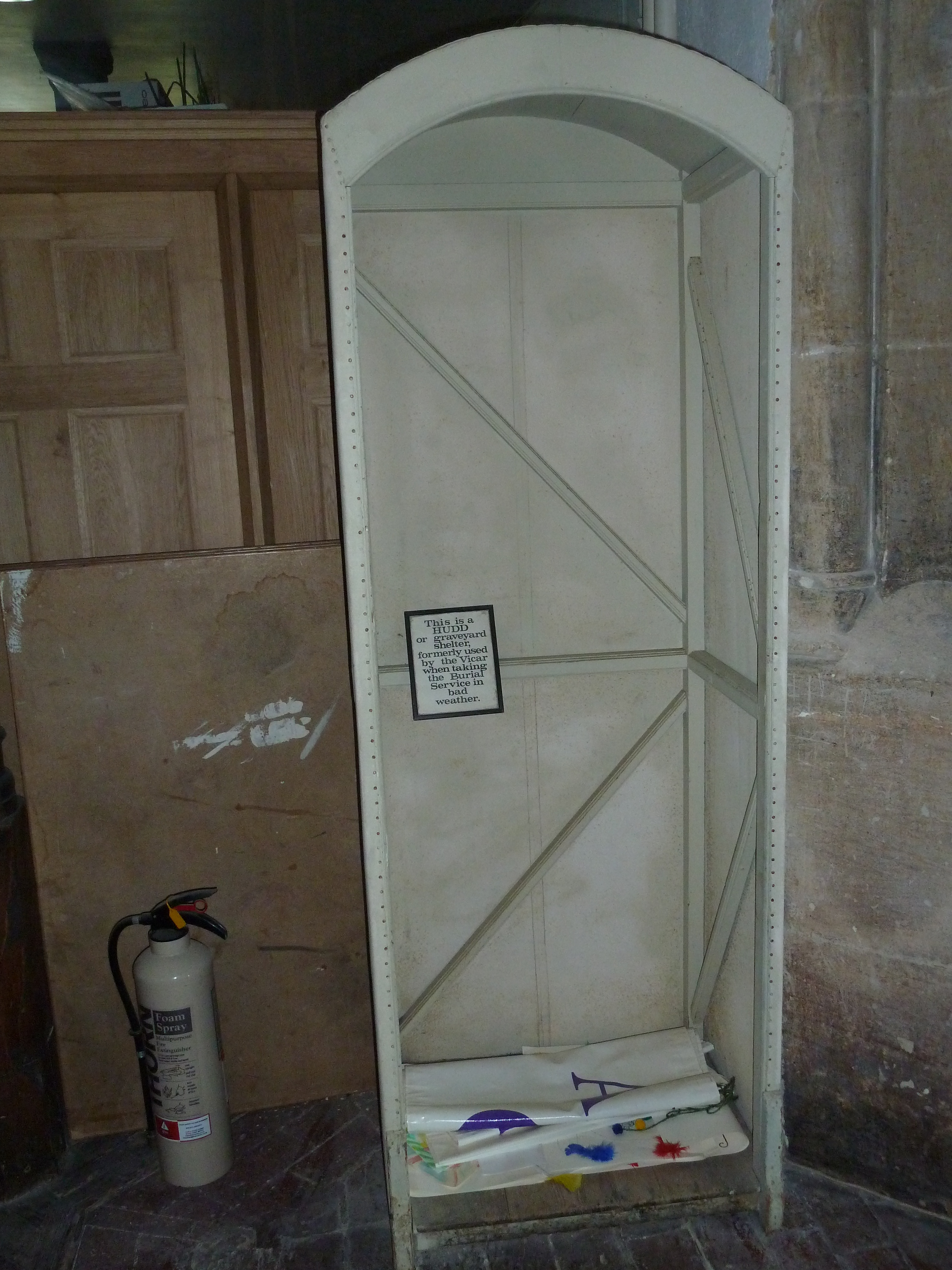
Hudd at All Saints, Odiham

A hudd was a sentry box shaped shelter used by Anglican clergymen in the past during the final part of a funeral. It was for them to stand in as they stood at the graveside when inclement weather posed a threat to their wigs.
