= Hongkong United Dockyards =

Coordinates: 22.3516°N 114.0830°E

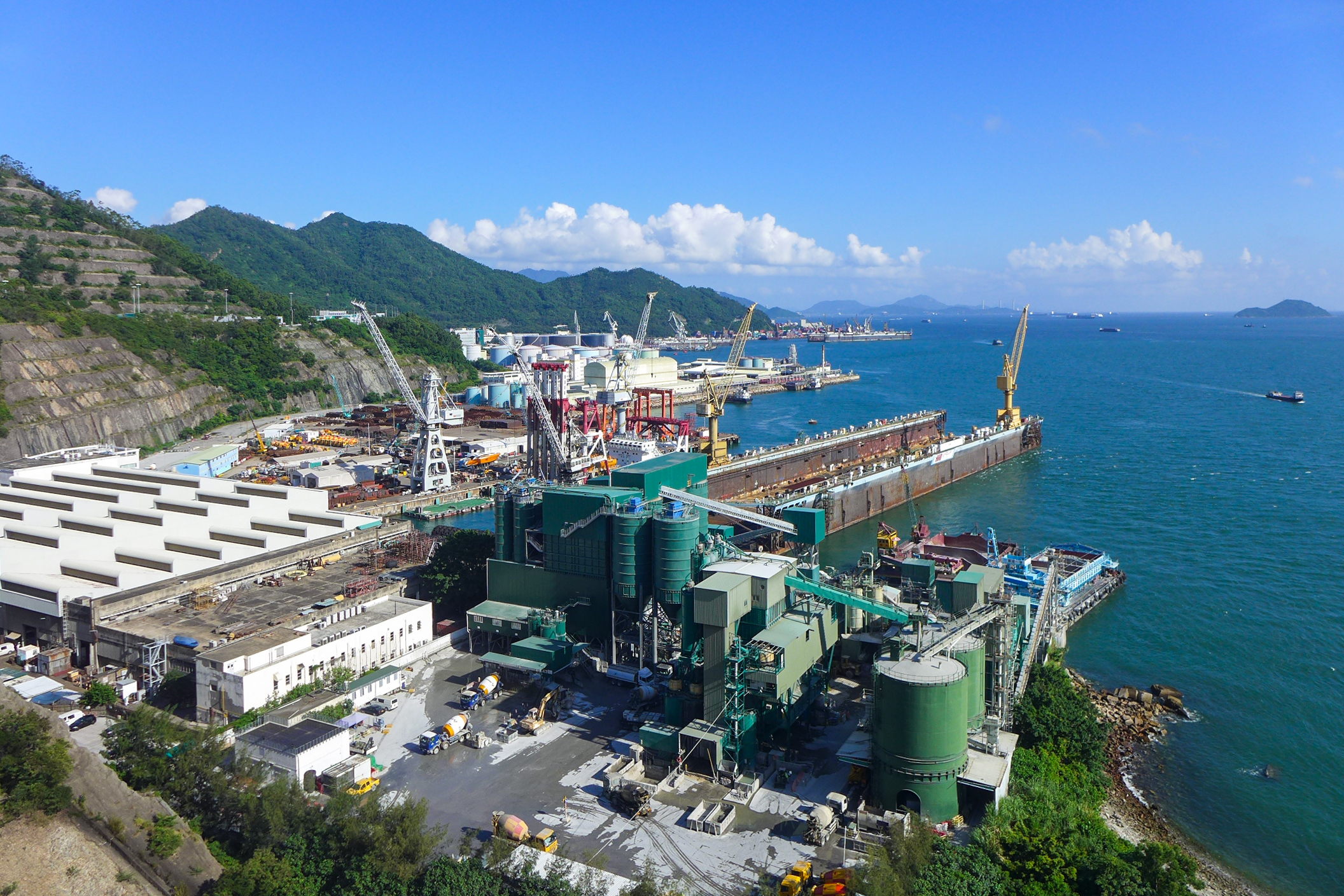
United Dockyard

Hongkong United Dockyards (Chinese: 香港聯合船塢; Jyutping: hoeng1 gong2 lyun4 hap6 syun4 ou3) abbreviated to United Dockyards (聯合船塢; lyun4 hap6 syun4 ou3) or HUD is a dockyard built on the site of the former Shek Wan or "Stone Bay" (石灣 sometimes written 石環; sek6 waan1), on Tsing Yi Island of Hong Kong.

== History ==
HUD was formed in 1973 from the merger of the Hong Kong and Whampoa Dock (1863) and the Taikoo Dockyard (1902 or 1905). It is jointly owned by CK Hutchison and Swire. The HUD facilities in Tsing Yi replaced the Whampoa Dockyard in Hung Hom, which became the Whampoa Garden estate, and the Taikoo Dockyard in Quarry Bay, which became the Taikoo Shing estate.

== Operations ==
HUD's main business is:

- Salvage and towage
- Ship repairs
- Land-based engineering projects

The company employs over 400 people including subcontractors to perform repairs.

The named United was added when it was acquired in 1995.

== Facilities ==
Instead of a fixed dockyard, it uses a 40,000t floating dockyard to perform repairs in Tsing Yi. There are two berths for ships being repaired but not requiring to be placed in the floating dock.

The dockyard has four Ramparts 3000 ASD tugs used to tow ships into the facility.

== Boats constructed ==
Most ships built here are for local use:

- Sea Lion class command boats 1965 – two for the Hong Kong Police Marine Region (retired 1993)
- Sea Rover class command boats 1955–56 – six for the Hong Kong Police Marine Region

== Transportation ==
The dockyard is accessible via:

- Green minibus 88M: Hong Kong United Dockyard <-> Kwai Fong station

The dockyard is also accessed by Routes 3 and 8 via Sai Tso Wan Road.
