= Protector (Pacific Forum)-class small patrol boat =

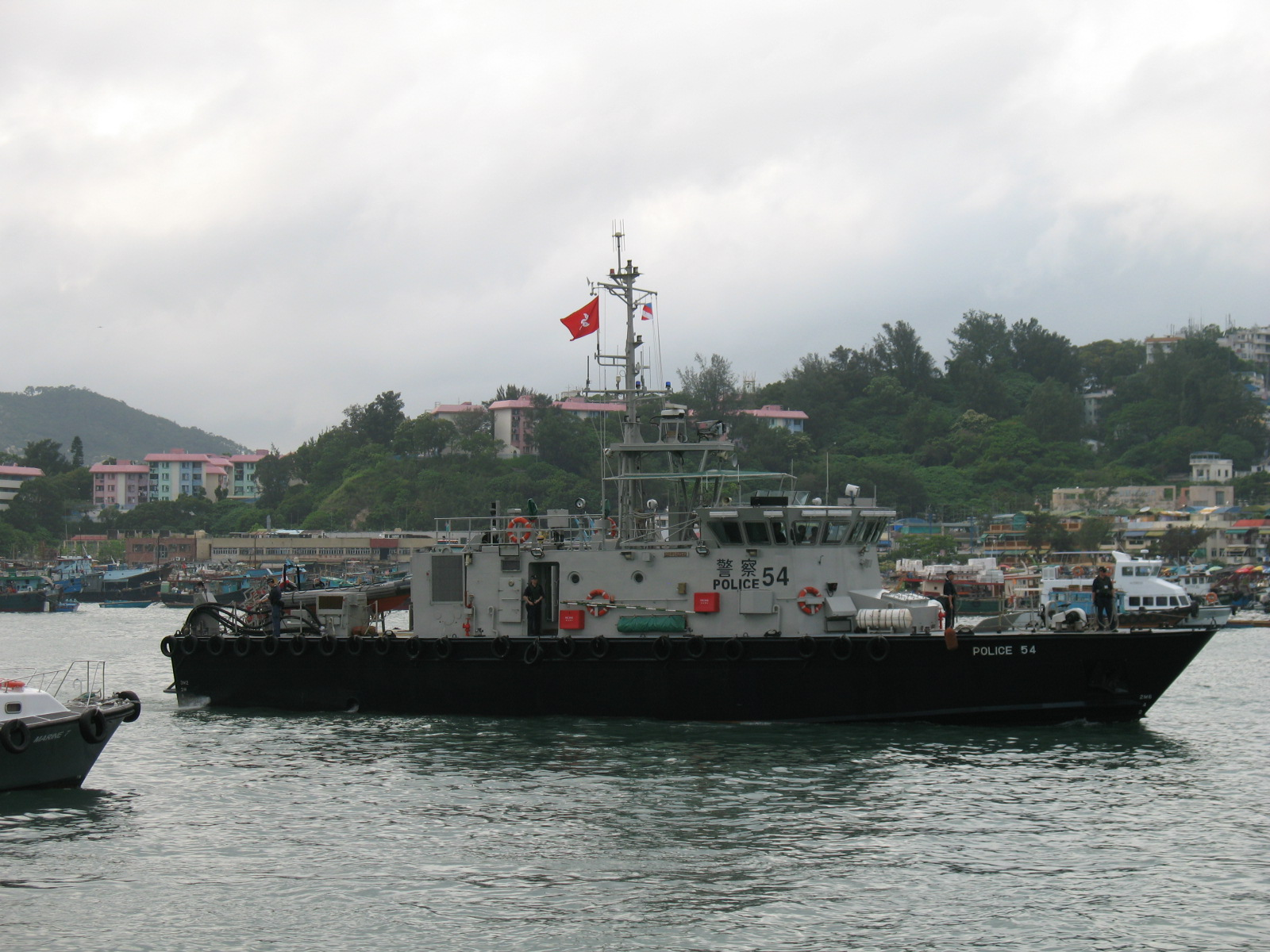
- Preserver at the Cheung Chau Typhoon Shelter in 2007

Class overview
- Name: Protector (Pacific Forum)
- Builders: Tenix Defence, South Coogee, Western Australia
- Operators: Hong Kong Police
- Built: 1993
- In commission: 1993
- Completed: 6
- Active: 6

General characteristics
- Type: small patrol boat
- Displacement: 170 tons
- Length: 32.6 m (106 ft 11 in)
- Beam: 8.2 m (26 ft 11 in)
- Draught: 1.6 m (5 ft 3 in)
- Propulsion: CODAD: 1 Cat cruise diesel, 1 waterjet, 775 bhp (578 kW); 2 Cat boost diesels, 2 shafts, 4,400 bhp (3,300 kW)
- Speed: 24 knots (44 km/h; 28 mph)
- Complement: 19
- Armament: one 12.7 mm machine gun, two 7.62 mm machine guns

Protector (Pacific Forum)-class small patrol boats are patrol boats built and used by the Hong Kong Police for marine patrols off Hong Kong. They are based on the Pacific-class patrol boat built in Australia for several Pacific island nations. Commissioned in 1993, six boats were delivered and in service:

- PL1 51 Protector
- PL2 52 Guardian
- PL3 53 Defender
- PL4 54 Preserver
- PL5 55 Rescuer
- PL6 56 Detector
