= Water police =

Brown-water police patrolling in watercraft

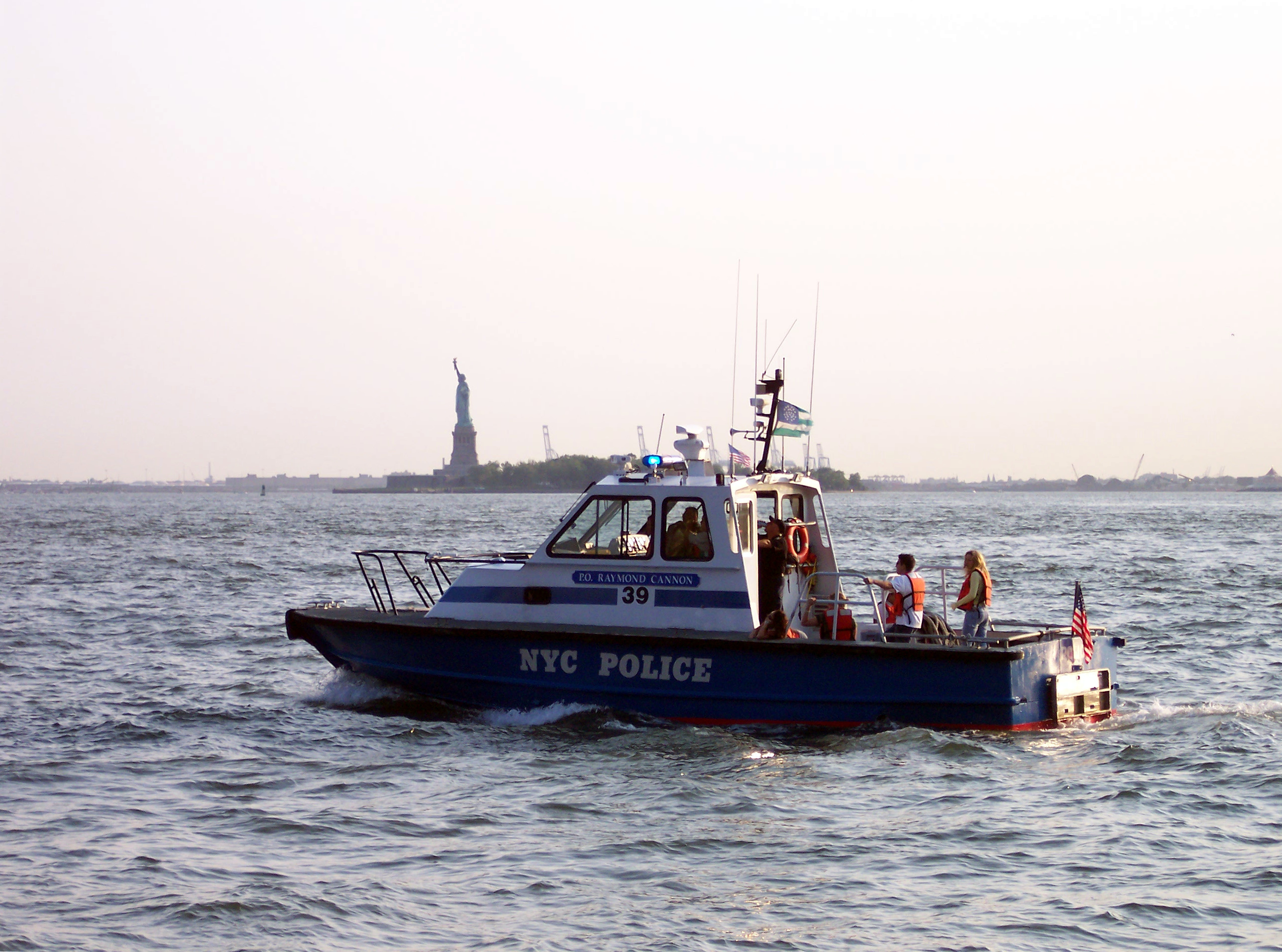
A NYPD boat on patrol in New York Harbor in 2006

Water police, also called bay constables, coastal police, harbor patrols, marine/maritime police/patrol, nautical patrols, port police, or river police are a specialty law enforcement portion of a larger police organization, who patrol in water craft. Their patrol areas may include coastal tidal waters, rivers, estuaries, harbors, lakes, canals or a combination of these.

== Duties and functions ==
Water police are usually responsible for ensuring the safety of water users, enforcing laws relating to water traffic, preventing crime on vessels, banks and shores, providing search and rescue services (either as the main provider or as an initial response unit before more specialized units arrive), and allowing land-based police to reach locations not easily accessible. They may also be responsible for coastal security, environmental law enforcement, immigration and smuggling interdiction, and diving operations (although many police organizations have separate units to handle this). Their operations may coordinate with other agencies with similar assets such as in the United States the various Federal, State or Local authorities may work together to promote or achieve similar enforcement or rescue outcomes. In the United States, some states have combined the duties of water police with those of conservation officers or state police.

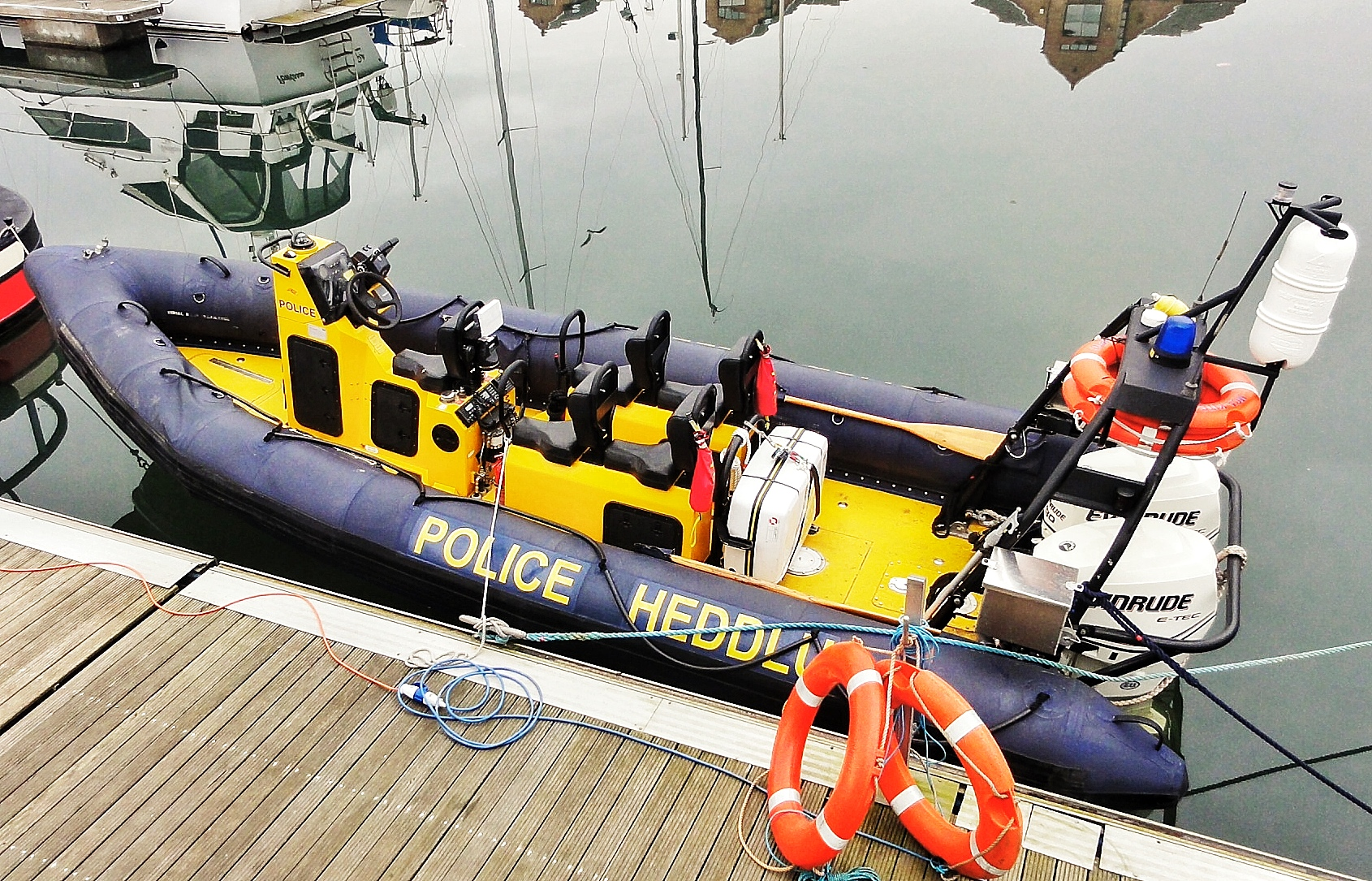
A rigid-hulled inflatable boat (RHIB) used by the UK's North West Police Underwater Search & Marine Unit. It is marked as both POLICE and HEDDLU, as it operates in both England and Wales

Equipment used ranges from personal water craft and inflatable boats to large seagoing craft, but most police vessels are small to medium, fast motorboats. In some areas these vessels incorporate a firefighting capability through a fixed deck nozzle. The operators of these vessels are generally trained in many rescue disciplines including first aid, vessel dewatering, and firefighting. They may also be trained as divers for rescue and recovery and as boat operators who may engage in towing operations.

== List of water police units ==
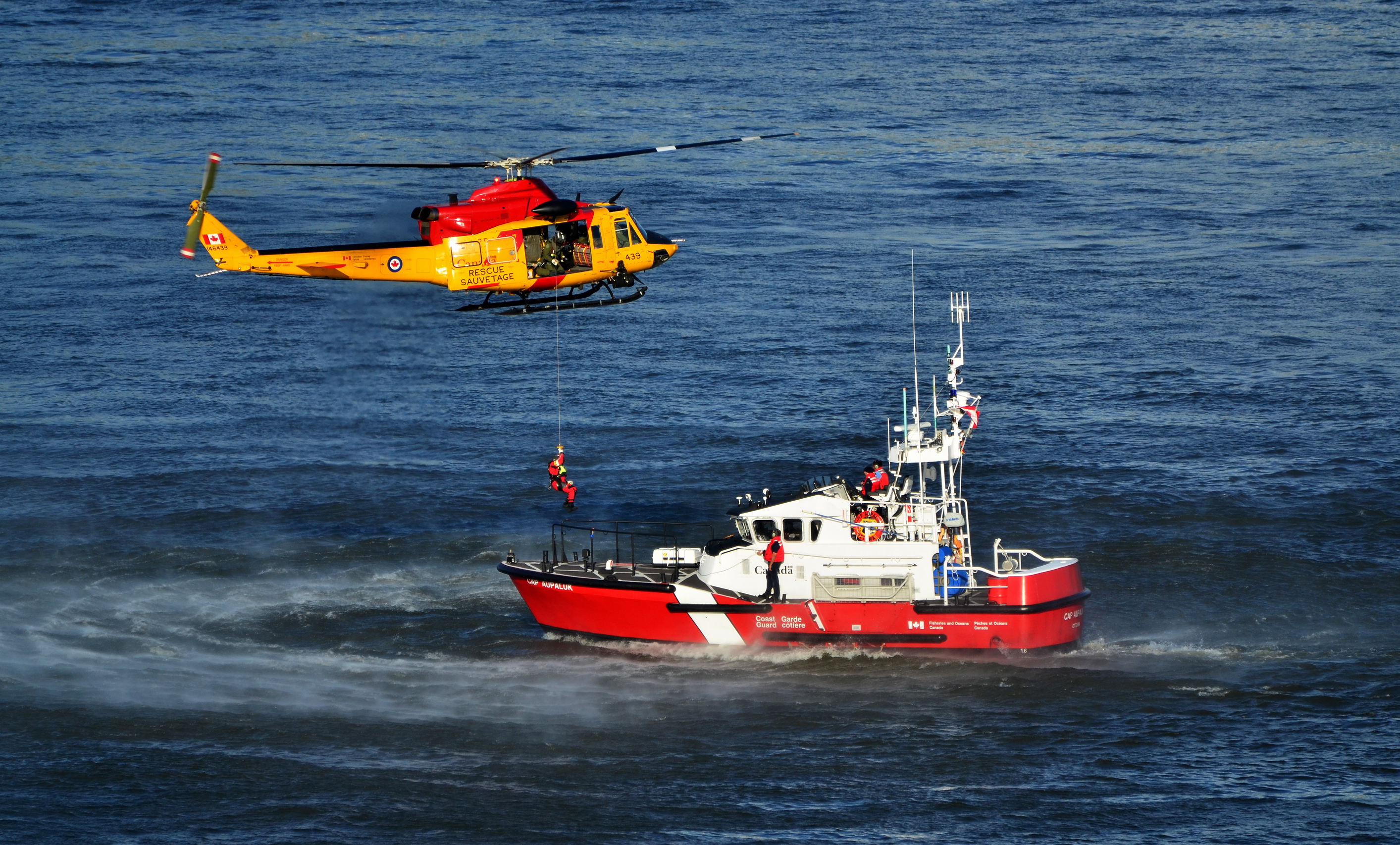
Rescue Exercise

=== Australia ===
- Australian Federal Police Water Police
- New South Wales Police Marine Area Command
- Northern Territory Police Marine and Fisheries Enforcement Unit
- Queensland Police Water Police
- South Australia Police Water Operations Unit
- Tasmania Police Marine and Rescue Services
- Victoria Police Water Police Squad
- Western Australia Police Water Police Branch

=== Austria ===
- Federal Police (Austria) Water Police of Austria (especially Vienna)

=== Bahamas ===
- Royal Bahamas Police Force Harbour Patrol

=== Bangladesh ===
- Bangladesh River Police

=== Belgium ===
- Belgian Federal Police Water Police Branch (DAC)

=== Bermuda ===
- Bermuda Police Marine Unit

=== Canada ===
- National
  - Royal Canadian Mounted Police West Coast Marine Detachment
  - (Police units, usually the RCMP, can join the Canadian Coast Guard on patrol)
- British Columbia
  - Vancouver Police Department Marine Squad
  - Victoria Police Department Marine Unit
- Ontario
  - Barrie Police Service Marine Unit
  - Brockville Police Service Marine Patrol Unit
  - Durham Regional Police Service Marine Unit
  - Hamilton Police Service
  - Halton Regional Police Marine Unit
  - London Police Service Marine Patrol Unit
  - Niagara Regional Police Service Marine Unit
  - Ontario Provincial Police – regional Marine Units and Underwater Search and Recovery Unit
  - Ottawa Police Service Marine/Underwater Unit
  - Peel Regional Police Marine Unit
  - Toronto Police Service Marine Unit – formed in 1982 to replace Toronto Harbour Commission Port Police and Harbour Police units.
  - York Regional Police Service Marine Unit
- Manitoba
  - Winnipeg Police Service River Patrol and Underwater Search and Recovery Unit
- Nova Scotia
  - Halifax Regional Police Lake Patrol
- Quebec
  - Montreal City Police Service Nautical Patrol
- Saskatchewan
  - Regina Police Service Underwater Investigation and Recovery Team
  - Saskatoon Police Service River Patrol Detail

=== Cayman Islands ===
- Royal Cayman Islands Police Marine Section

=== Finland ===
- Helsinki Police Department Boat Unit

=== France ===
- Maritime Gendarmerie
- Brigades nautiques et fluviales

=== Germany ===
- Federal Police units embedded within the Coast Guard
- Water Protection Police units of the following State Police:
  - Baden-Württemberg Police
  - Bavarian State Police
  - Berlin Police
  - Brandenburg Police
  - Bremen Police
  - Hamburg Police
  - Hesse State Police
  - Lower Saxony Police
  - Mecklenburg-Vorpommern Police
  - North Rhine-Westphalia Police
  - Rhineland-Palatinate Police
  - Saarland Police
  - Saxony Police
  - Saxony-Anhalt Police
  - Schleswig-Holstein Police

=== Ghana ===
- Marine Police Unit

=== Gibraltar ===
- Gibraltar Services Police Marine Unit – a civil police force which guards and enforces law on UK Ministry of Defence installations in Gibraltar.
- Royal Gibraltar Police Marine Section

=== Greece ===
- Hellenic Coast Guard, whose full name is "Harbour Corps-Hellenic Coast Guard," was originally founded in 1919 as the "Harbour Corps" (Greek: Λιμενικό Σώμα) to act as Greece's maritime and harbour police. It still performs this role, and it is often referred to as the "Harbour [Corps]" (Λιμενικό) in everyday Greek parlance.

=== Hong Kong ===
- Hong Kong Police Force Marine Region – The Marine Police patrol 1,651 km^{2} (637 sq mi) of waters within the territory of Hong Kong, including 263 islands. The Marine Region with about 3,000 officers, and a fleet of 143 in total, made up of 71 launches and 72 craft is the largest of any civil police force. Was referred to as Water Police until 1948 when it was renamed Marine Police.

=== Indonesia ===
- Indonesian National Police – Polisi Perairan dan Udara (POLAIRUD)

=== India ===
- Kerala Coastal Police, coastal security division of Kerala State Police
- Coastal Security Group, coastal security wing of Tamil Nadu Police
- Various coastal/marine police units of the respective State/UT police forces.

=== Ireland ===
- Dublin Harbour Police
- Dún Laoghaire Harbour Police
- Garda Síochána Water Unit

=== Israel ===
- Israeli Police Marine Police

=== Italy ===
  - Corps of the Port Captaincies – Coast Guard Maritime police
  - Guardia di Finanza Marine Police Section

=== Jamaica ===
- Jamaica Constabulary Force Marine Division

=== Malaysia ===
- Royal Malaysian Police Marine Operations Force

=== Marshall Islands ===
- Kwajalein Police Department Marine Police Section

=== Monaco ===
- Monaco Police Force Marine Division

=== Myanmar ===
- Myanmar Police Force Maritime Police Force

=== Netherlands ===
- Dienst Waterpolitie, water police force, a subdivision of the "Landelijke Eenheid" (LE), the nationwide unit.

=== New Zealand ===
- New Zealand Police Maritime Policing Unit

=== Panama ===
- National Aeronaval Service

=== Philippines ===
- Philippine National Police
  - Philippine National Police Maritime Group

=== Portugal ===
- Polícia Marítima Maritime Police
- Republican National Guard (Portugal) Unidade de Controlo Costeiro (Coast Control Unit)

=== Russia ===
- Police of Russia's Water Police
- Saint Petersburg Police's river police
- Moscow Police's river police
- FSB's Russian Coast Guard
- National Guard Maritime Unit

=== Serbia ===
- Police of Serbia's River Police

=== Singapore ===
- Singapore Police Force Police Coast Guard

=== Spain ===
- Guardia Civil Guardia Civil del Mar
- Servicio de Vigilancia Aduanera (Customs)

=== Sri Lanka ===
- Sri Lanka Police Service Marine Division

=== South Africa ===
- South African Police Service Water Wing

=== Sweden ===
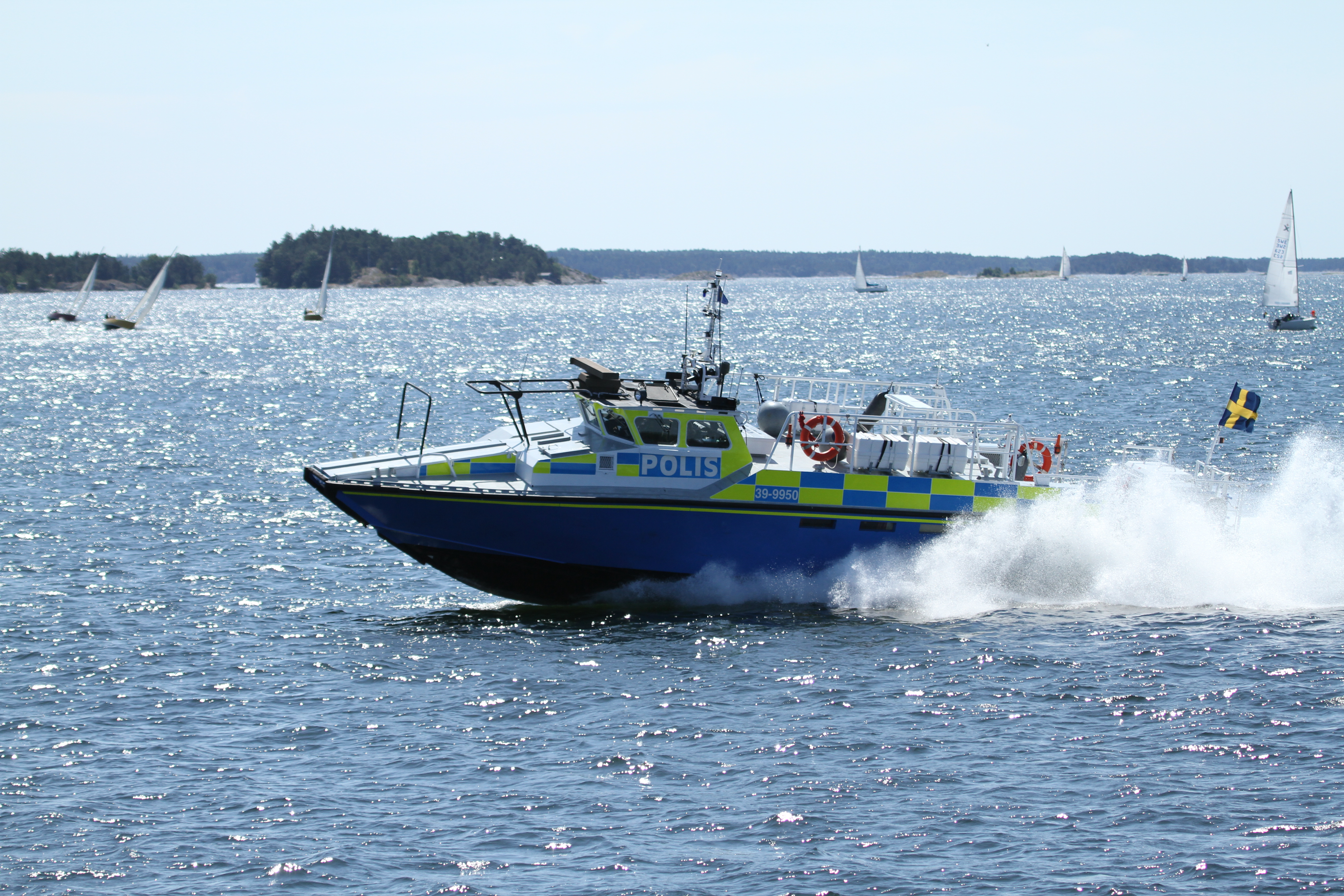
Police version of Combat Boat 90 in the Stockholm Archipelago.

The Swedish Police Authority operates maritime patrol units (Sjöpolisen) based in Stockholm and in Göteborg.

=== Thailand ===
- Royal Thai Police ( Thai Marine Police Division)

=== United Kingdom ===
- Devon and Cornwall Constabulary Marine Operations Section
- Dyfed-Powys Police Marine Unit
- Dorset Police Marine Section
- Essex Police Marine and Diving Unit
- Hampshire Constabulary Marine Unit
- Kent Police Marine Unit
- Lothian and Borders Police Marine Section
- Metropolitan Police Marine Policing Unit (formerly Thames Division)
- Ministry of Defence Police Marine Unit
- Norfolk Constabulary Broads policing unit by boat with support from 'Broads beat' officers on land
- Northumbria Police Marine Unit
- North West Police Underwater Search & Marine Unit
- Police Scotland Dive and Marine Unit

=== United States ===
Federal

- National Oceanic and Atmospheric Administration Fisheries Office of Law Enforcement
- United States Coast Guard
  - Law Enforcement Detachments (LEDETS)
  - Maritime Law Enforcement Specialist
- United States Customs and Border Protection: Air and Marine Operations
- United States Fish and Wildlife Service Office of Law Enforcement
- United States Park Police Marine Unit

District of Columbia

- Metropolitan Police Department Harbor Patrol

Alabama

- Alabama Department of Conservation and Natural Resources Marine Resources In 2013 The Marine Police Division was merged into the Alabama Department of Public Safety's Marine Patrol Division

Arizona

- Maricopa County Sheriff's Office Lake Patrol Division, Arizona

California

- East Bay Regional Park District Police Department Marine Patrol Unit, California
- El Dorado County Sheriff's Office Boat Patrol, California
- Los Angeles Port Police, Port of Los Angeles, California
- Long Beach Harbor Patrol, Port of Long Beach, California
- Kern County Parks and Recreation Lake Patrol, California
- Marin County Sheriff's Office Marine Patrol, California
- Placer County Sheriff's Office Marine Unit, California
- Sacramento County Sheriff's Department Marine Enforcement Detail, California
- Sacramento Police Department Marine Division, California
- San Diego Harbor Police Department Public Safety Agency California
- Santa Barbara County Sheriff's Office Marine Unit, California

Connecticut

- Bridgeport Police Department Marine Unit
- Candlewood Lake Authority Marine Patrol
- Columbia Lake Marine Patrol
- Connecticut Environmental Conservation Police
- Coventry Marine Patrol
- Cromwell Police Department Marine Patrol
- Darien Police Department Marine Division
- Fairfield Police Department Marine Unit
- Greenwich Police Department Marine Operations Section, Connecticut
- Groton City Police Department Marine Patrol
- Lake Housatonic Authority Marine Patrol
- Metropolitan District Commission Police Department, Connecticut
- Middletown Police Department Marine Unit
- Milford Police Department Marine Patrol
- Norwalk Police Department Marine Unit
- Norwich Police Department Harbor Patrol
- Old Saybrook Police Department Marine Patrol
- Stamford Police Department Harbor Unit
- Stratford Police Department Marine Unit
- Westbrook Police Department Marine Patrol
- Westport Police Department Marine Division

Delaware

- Delaware Natural Resources Police, Delaware Department of Natural Resources and Environmental Control, Division of Fish and Wildlife
- Delaware State Police Maritime Unit
- Dover Police Department Marine Patrol Section, Delaware
- Wilmington Police Department Marine Unit

Florida

- Boynton Beach Police Department Marine Patrol, Florida
- Daytona Beach Police Department Marine Unit, Florida
- Florida Department of Environmental Protection Bureau of Park Patrol
- Florida Fish and Wildlife Commission Law Enforcement
- Fort Lauderdale Police Department Marine Unit, Florida
- Hollywood Police Department Marine Unit, Florida
- Key West Police Department Marine Unit, Florida
- Lake County Sheriff's Office Marine Unit, Florida
- Miami-Dade Police Department Marine Patrol, Florida
- North Miami Police Department Marine Patrol, Florida
- North Miami Beach Police Department Marine Patrol, Florida
- Orlando Police Department Marine Patrol Unit, Florida
- Polk County Sheriff's Office Marine Unit, Florida
- Tampa Police Department Marine Unit, Florida

Georgia

- Chatham County Police Department Marine Patrol Unit, Georgia
- Georgia Department of Natural Resources Law Enforcement Division

Illinois

- Chicago Police Department Marine Unit, Illinois
- Lake County Sheriff's Office Marine Unit, Illinois

Indiana

- Lake County Sheriff's Department Marine Unit, Indiana

Iowa

- Des Moines Police Department Waterway Operations Unit, Iowa

Kentucky

- Kentucky Department of Fish and Wildlife Resources Water Patrol

Louisiana

- Levee District Police, Louisiana
- Port of New Orleans Harbor Police Department Patrol Boat Division, Louisiana

Maine

- Cumberland County Sheriff's Office Marine Patrol, conducts seasonal patrols on Sebago Lake
- Brunswick Police Department Marine Resources Unit
- Biddeford & Saco Harbor Patrol, a joint patrol between the Biddeford Police Department and Saco Police Department
- Falmouth Police Department, Marine Unit
- Maine Marine Patrol, Maine Department of Marine Resources

Maryland

- Baltimore Police Department Marine Unit, Maryland
- Baltimore County Police Department Marine Unit, Maryland
- Maryland Natural Resources Police
- Maryland Transportation Authority Police Department Marine Unit

Massachusetts

- Barnstable Police Department Marine Division, Massachusetts
- Boston Police Department Harbor Unit, Massachusetts
- Massachusetts Environmental Police
- Massachusetts State Police Marine Unit
- Webster Police Department Marine Patrol, Massachusetts

Michigan

- Detroit Police Department Harbor Master Unit, Michigan
- Ludington Marine Patrol (jointly operated by city police and fire departments), Michigan
- Macomb County Sheriff's Office Marine Division, Michigan
- Michigan Department of Natural Resources Law Enforcement Division, Marine Patrol
- Muskegon County Sheriff's Office Marine Division, Michigan
- Oakland County Sheriff's Office Marine Unit, Michigan
- Ottawa County Sheriff's Office Marine Division, Michigan
- Wayne County Sheriff's Office Marine Division, Michigan

Minnesota

- Hennepin County, Minnesota Sheriff's Office Water Patrol, Hennepin County, Minnesota

Missouri

- Missouri State Water Patrol Department of Public Safety, Jefferson City, Missouri

New Hampshire

- New Hampshire Fish and Game Department Law Enforcement Division
- New Hampshire Marine Patrol Department of Safety

New Jersey

- Brick Township Police Department Marine Unit
- Brielle Police Department Marine Unit
- New Jersey Conservation Police
- New Jersey State Park Police
- New Jersey State Police Marine Services Bureau
- Ocean County Sheriff's Office Marine Unit
- Secaucus Police Department Marine Operations Bureau
- Union County Police Department Marine Unit

New York

- Town of Babylon Public Safety Department Marine Patrols/Bay Constables, New York
- Erie County Sheriff's Office Marine Patrol Unit, New York
- Evans Police Department Marine Rescue and Recovery Unit, New York
- Huntington Harbormasters Office /Marine Patrol
- Town of Islip Harbor Police, New York
- Nassau County Police Department Marine Division, New York
- New York Environmental Conservation Police, New York Department of Environmental Conservation
- New York City Police Department Harbor Unit, New York
- New York City Police Department Auxiliary Police Harbor Unit, New York
- New York State Police Marine Detail
- Putnam County Sheriff's Office Marine Unit, New York
- Suffolk County Police Department Marine Bureau, New York
- Suffolk County Sheriff's Office Marine Unit, New York

North Carolina

- Catawba County Sheriff's Office Lake Patrol Unit,
- North Carolina Marine Patrol
- Charlotte-Mecklenburg Police Department Lakes Enforcement Division, North Carolina
- Cornelius Police Department Lake Patrol Unit Cornelius, North Carolina
- Gaston County Police Department Marine Enforcement Division, North Carolina

Ohio

- Butler County Sheriff's Office Marine Patrol, Ohio
- Hamilton County Sheriff's Office Marine Patrol Unit, Ohio
- Henry County Sheriff's Office Marine Patrol Division, Ohio
- Huron Police Department Harbor Patrol,
- Lake County Sheriff's Office Marine Patrol, Ohio
- Lorain Port Authority Marine Patrol, Ohio
- Ohio Department of Natural Resources Division of Watercraft
- Perrysburg Township Police Department Marine Patrol, Ohio
- Rocky River Police Department Marine Patrol, Ohio
- Ross County Sheriff's Office Marine Patrol Unit, Ohio
- Sandusky Police Department Marine Patrol, Ohio
- Summit County Sheriff's Office Marine Patrol, Ohio
- Toledo Police Department Harbor Patrol, Ohio
- Vermilion Police Department Marine Patrol Unit, Ohio

Oklahoma

- Oklahoma City Police Department Lake Patrol Section, Oklahoma
- Oklahoma Highway Patrol Lake Patrol Section (Troop W)
- Grand River Dam Authority

Pennsylvania

- Pennsylvania Fish and Boat Commission, Bureau of Law Enforcement
- Philadelphia Police Department Marine Unit, Pennsylvania
- Pittsburgh Bureau of Police River Rescue Unit, Pennsylvania (operated jointly with the city's Bureau of Emergency Medical Services and featured in the movie Striking Distance)

Rhode Island

- Providence Police Department Harbor Patrol, Rhode Island
- Rhode Island Environmental Police, Rhode Island Department of Environmental Management

South Carolina

- Charleston Police Department Harbor Patrol. South Carolina
- Division of Law Enforcement, South Carolina Division of Natural Resources

Tennessee

- Hamilton County Sheriff's Office Marine Division, Tennessee

Texas

- Austin Park Police, Texas

Vermont

- Colchester Police Department Marine Unit, Colchester, Vermont
- Vermont State Police Marine Division Vermont

Virginia

- Henrico County Division of Police Marine Patrol, Virginia
- Virginia Marine Police, Law Enforcement Division, Virginia Marine Resources Commission

Washington

- Anacortes Police Department Marine Patrol, Washington
- Kent Police Department Marine Patrol Unit, Washington
- King County Sheriff's Office Marine/Dive Unit, Washington
- Olympia Police Department Harbor Patrol, Washington
- Poulsbo Police Department Marine Patrol, Washington
- Seattle Police Department Harbor Patrol, Washington

Wisconsin

- Dane County Sheriff's Office Marine Patrol Division, Wisconsin
- Milwaukee Police Department Harbor Patrol Unit, Wisconsin
- Wisconsin Department of Natural Resources Lakes Patrol Unit

Multistate

- Port Authority of New York and New Jersey Police Department, Port Authority of New York and New Jersey
- Delaware River Port Authority Police Department Marine Unit

=== Vietnam ===
  - Ministry of Public Security: Vietnam People's Public Security
    - Department of Traffic Police: Vietnam Traffic Police
      - Bureau of Water Traffic Patrol and Control: Vietnam River Police
      - Bureau of Water Criminal Investigation: Vietnam River Police
      - River Squadron I
      - River Squadron II
      - River Squadron III

== Gallery ==
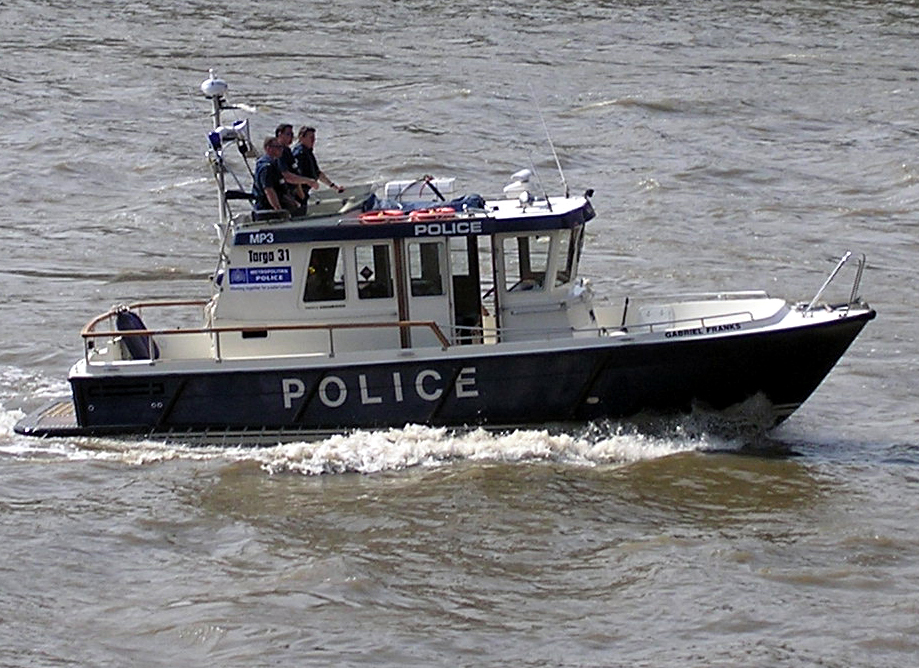
A Metropolitan Police launch on the River Thames in London

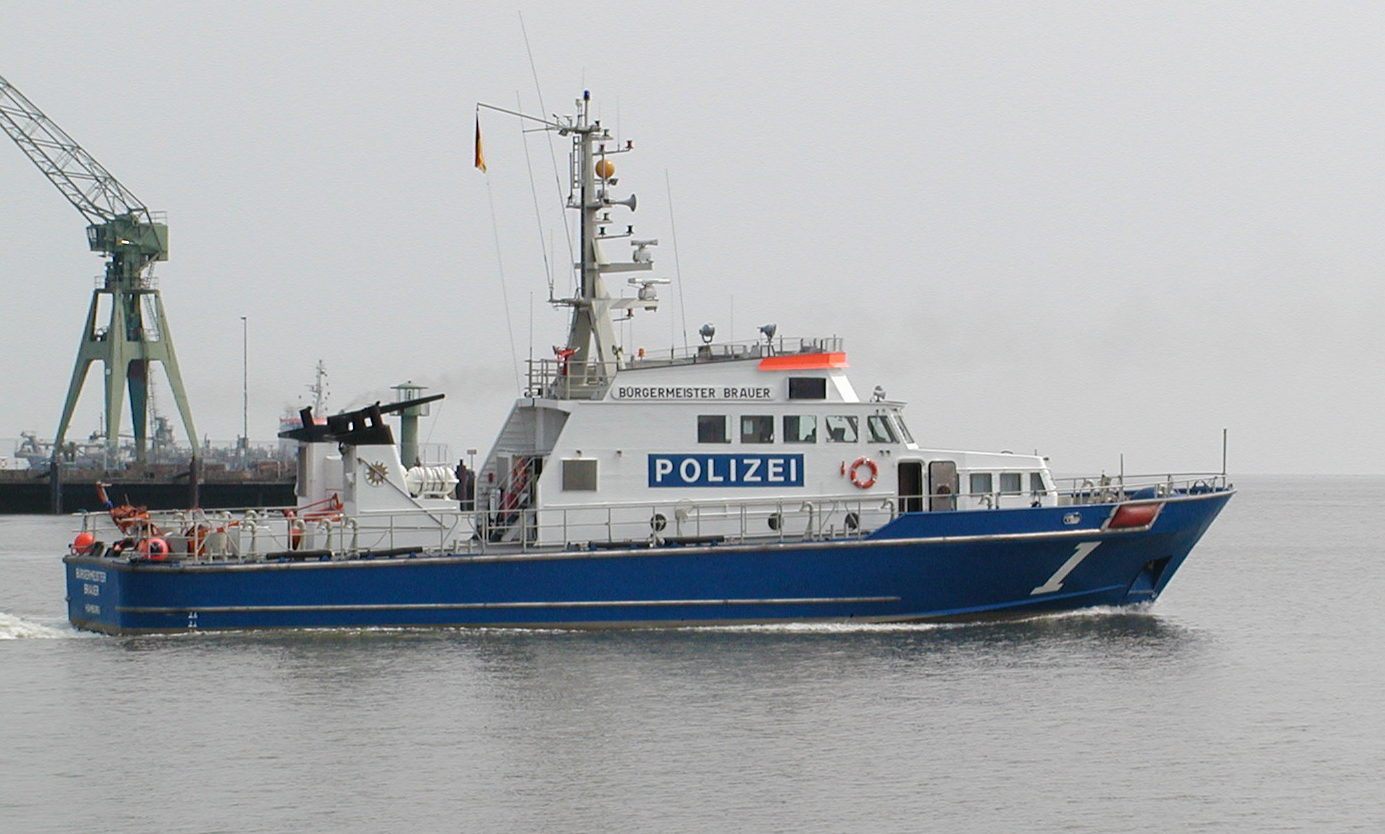
Patrol boat of the Wasserschutzpolizei of Hamburg/Germany

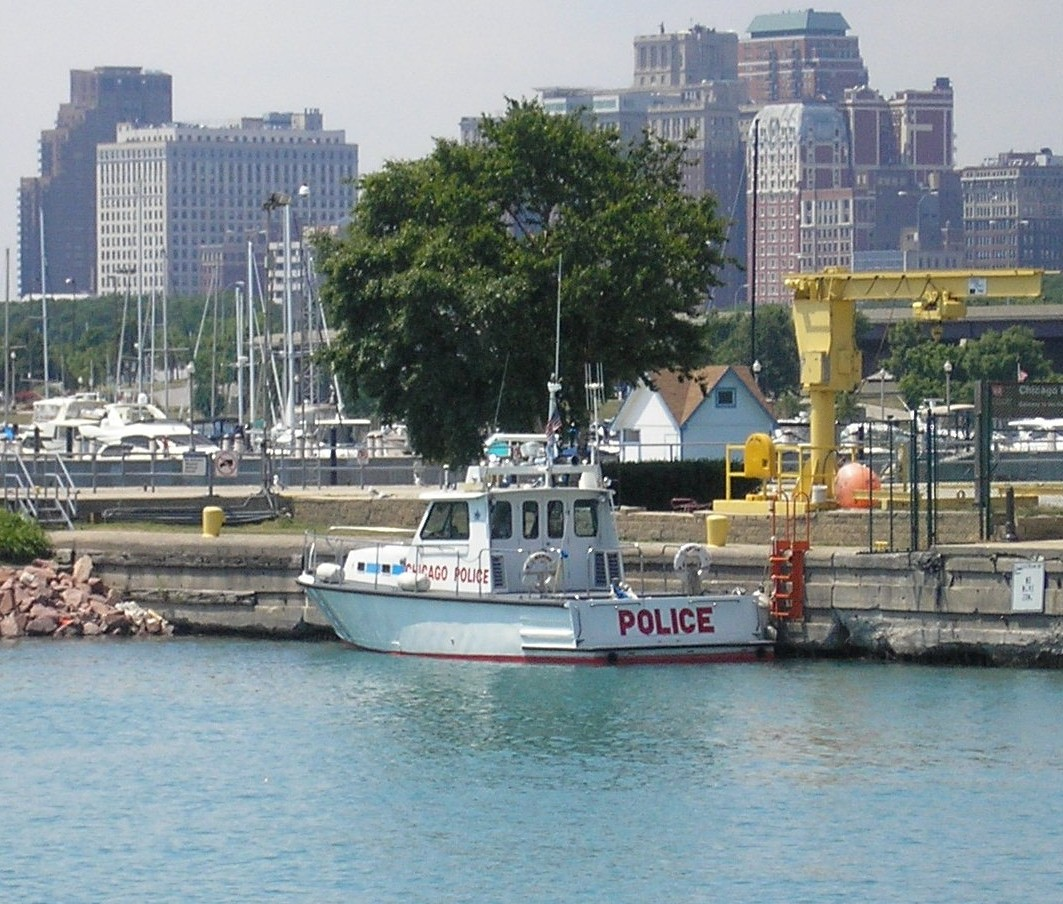
A Chicago Police Department boat on Lake Michigan

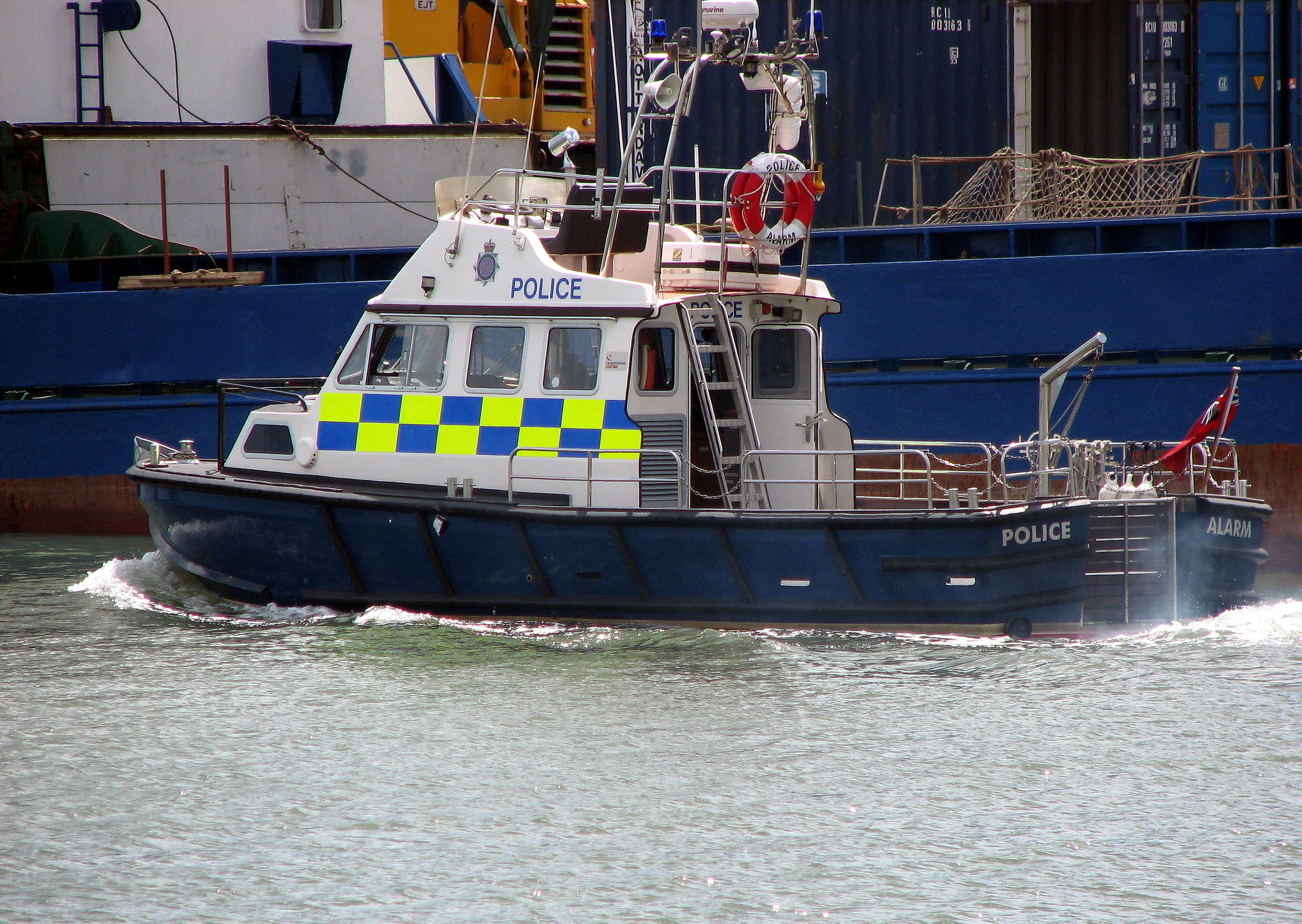
Police boat in Poole Harbour, Dorset, England

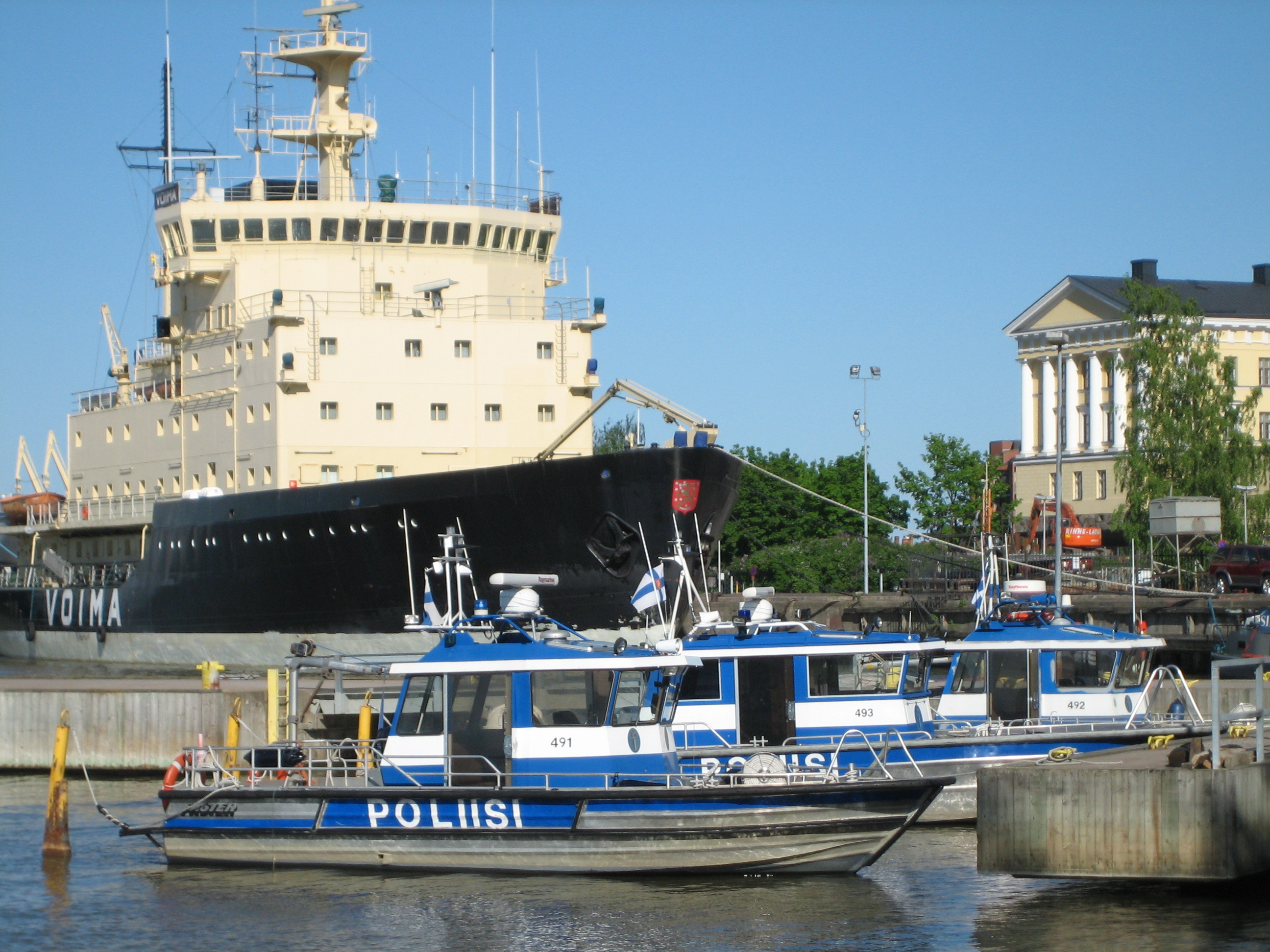
Helsinki Police Department patrol Boats 491, 192, and 493 in front of ice breaker Voima at Katajanokka, Helsinki, Finland.

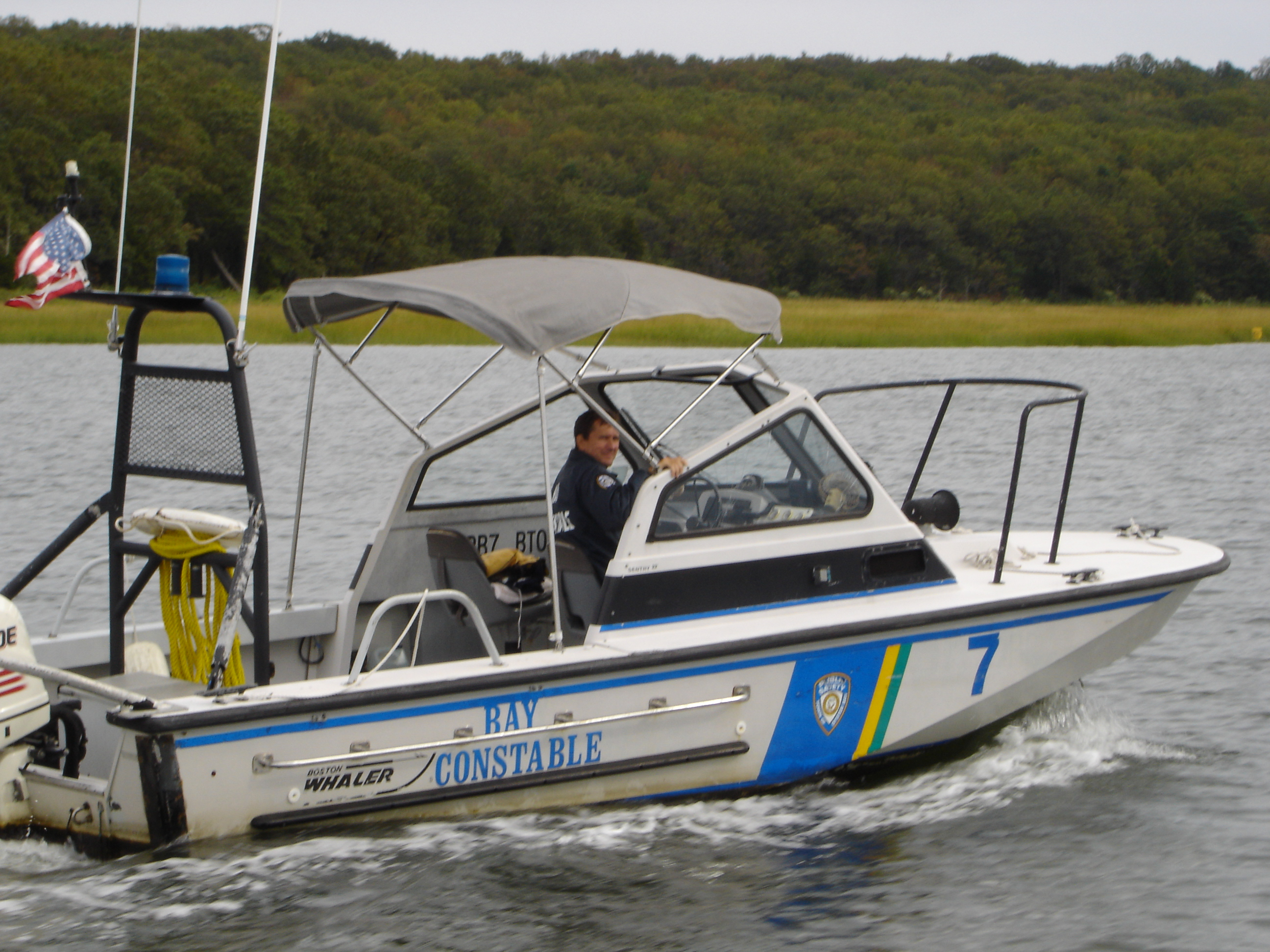
Town of Oyster Bay constable on patrol in waters on the north shore of Long Island, NY

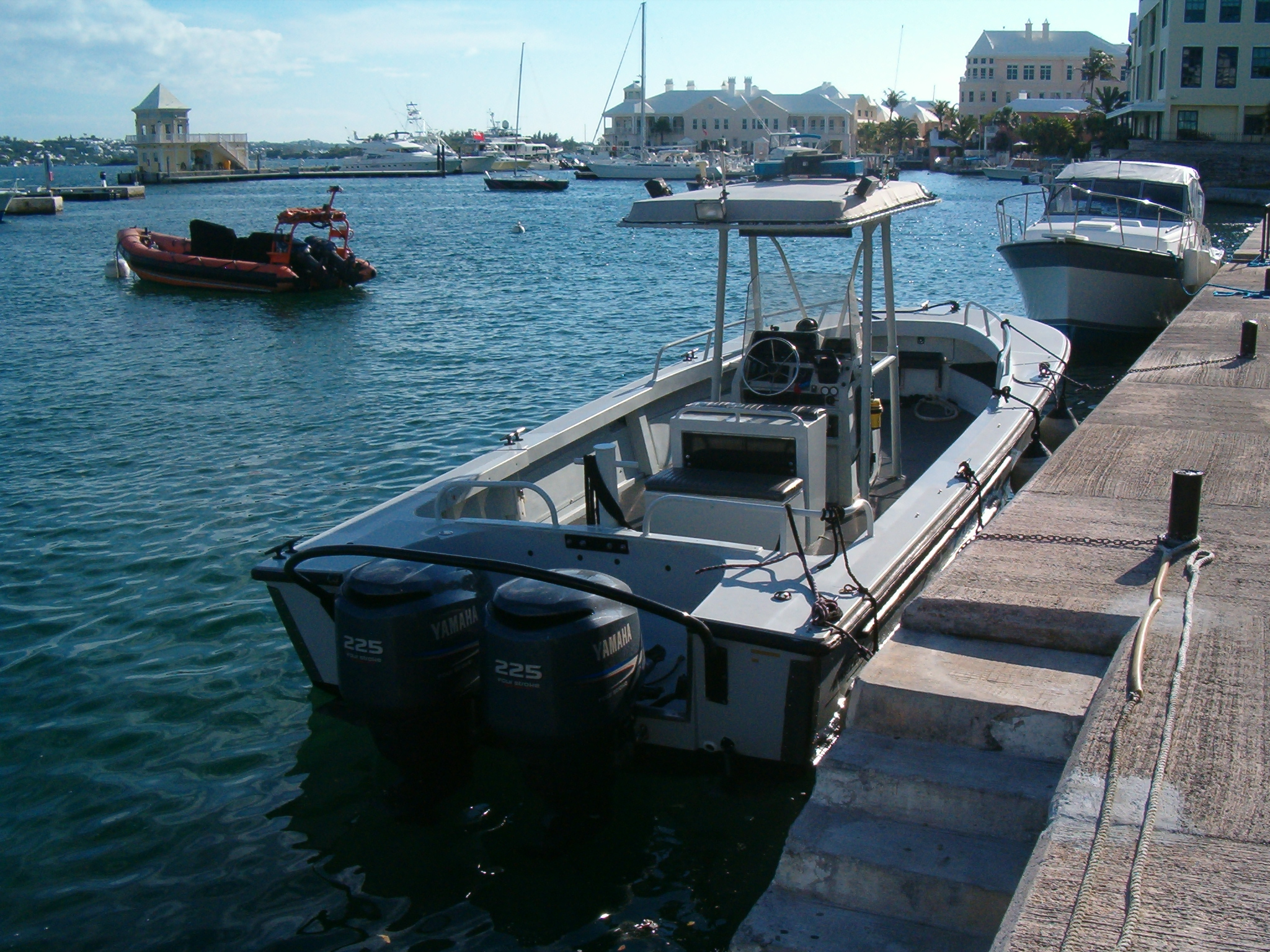
Boats of the Marine Section of the Bermuda Police Service at Barr's Bay, in Hamilton, Bermuda.

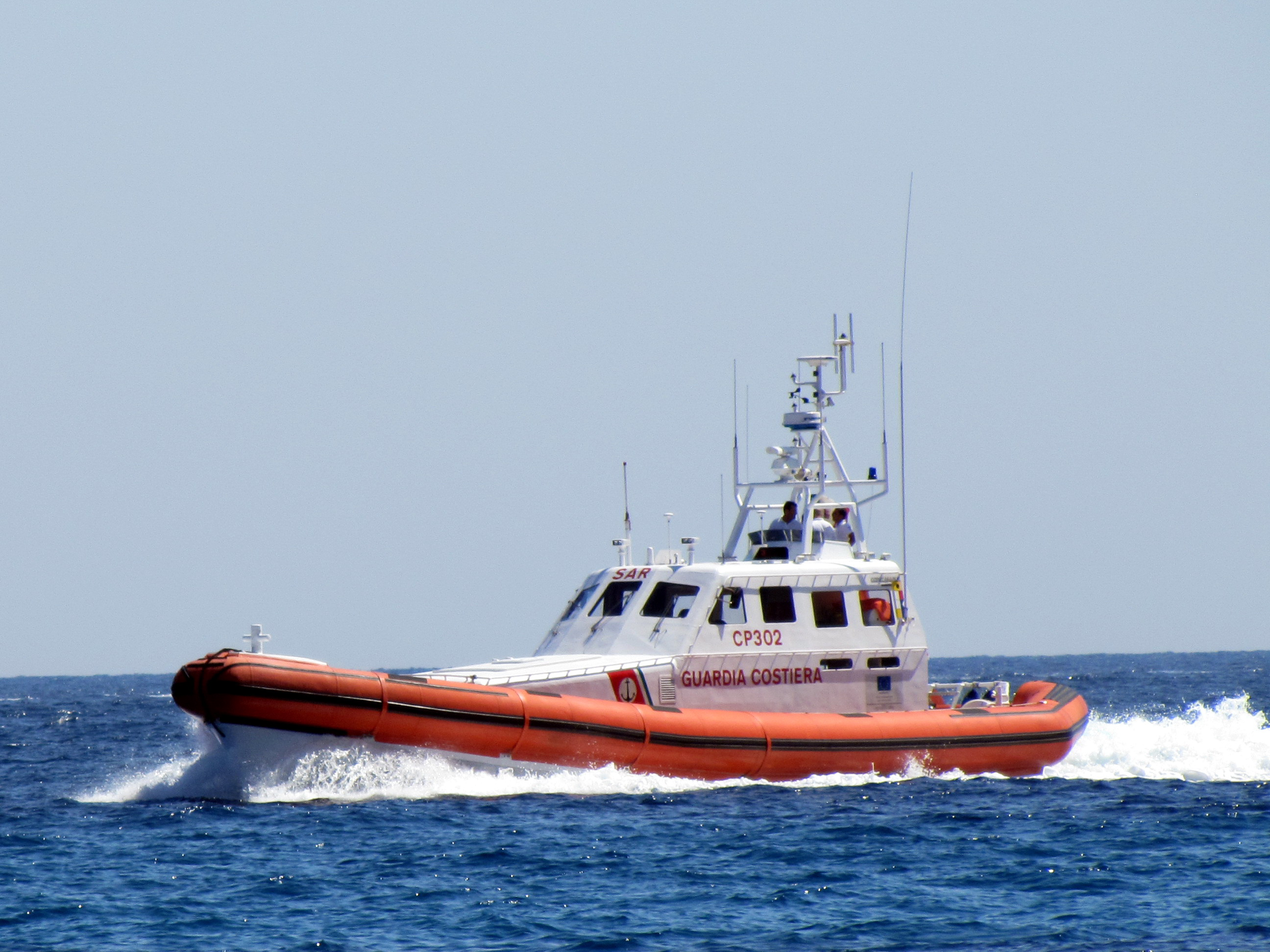
Italian Maritime Police Patrol boat

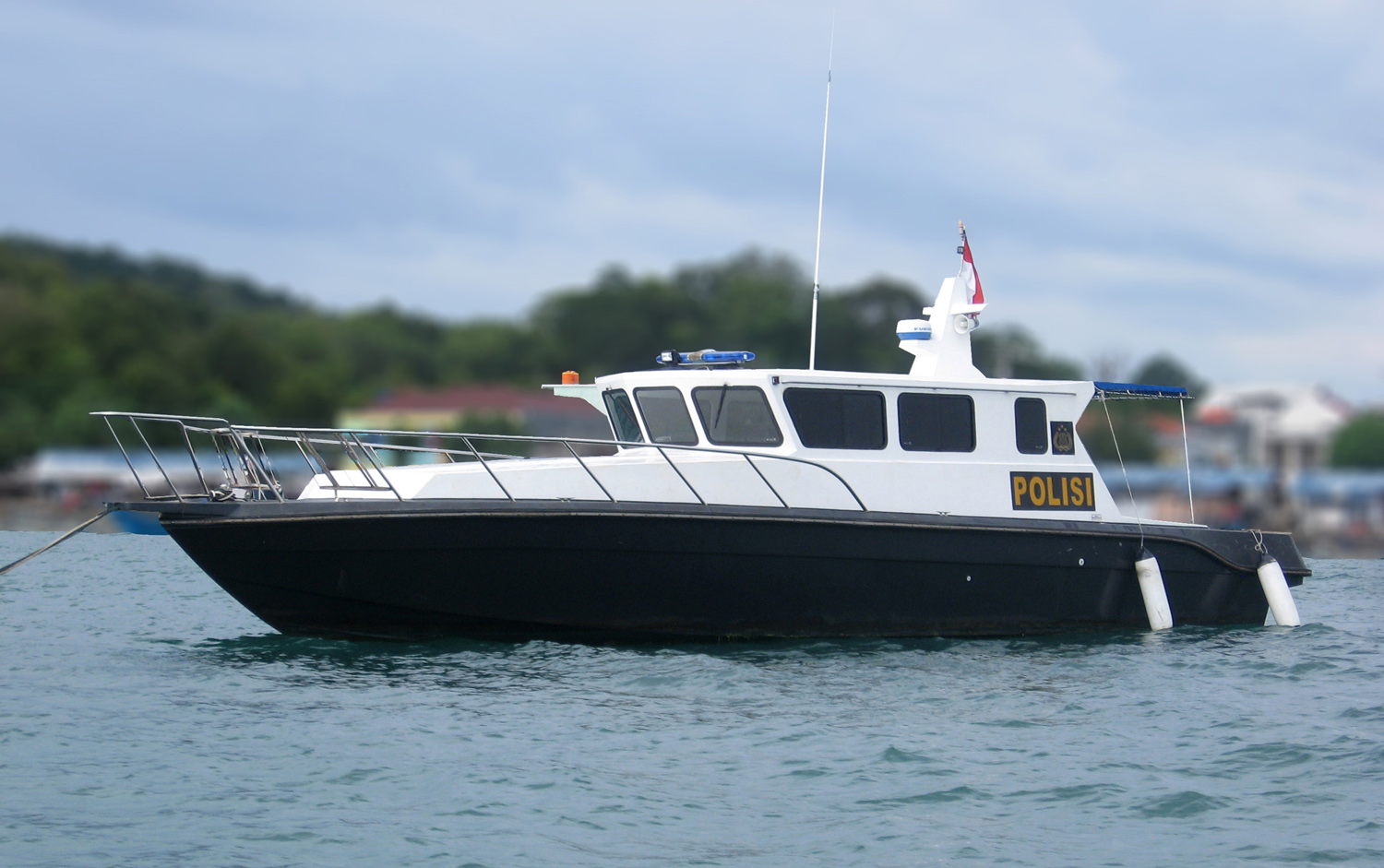
Indonesian POLAIR (Marine Police) Patrol Boat

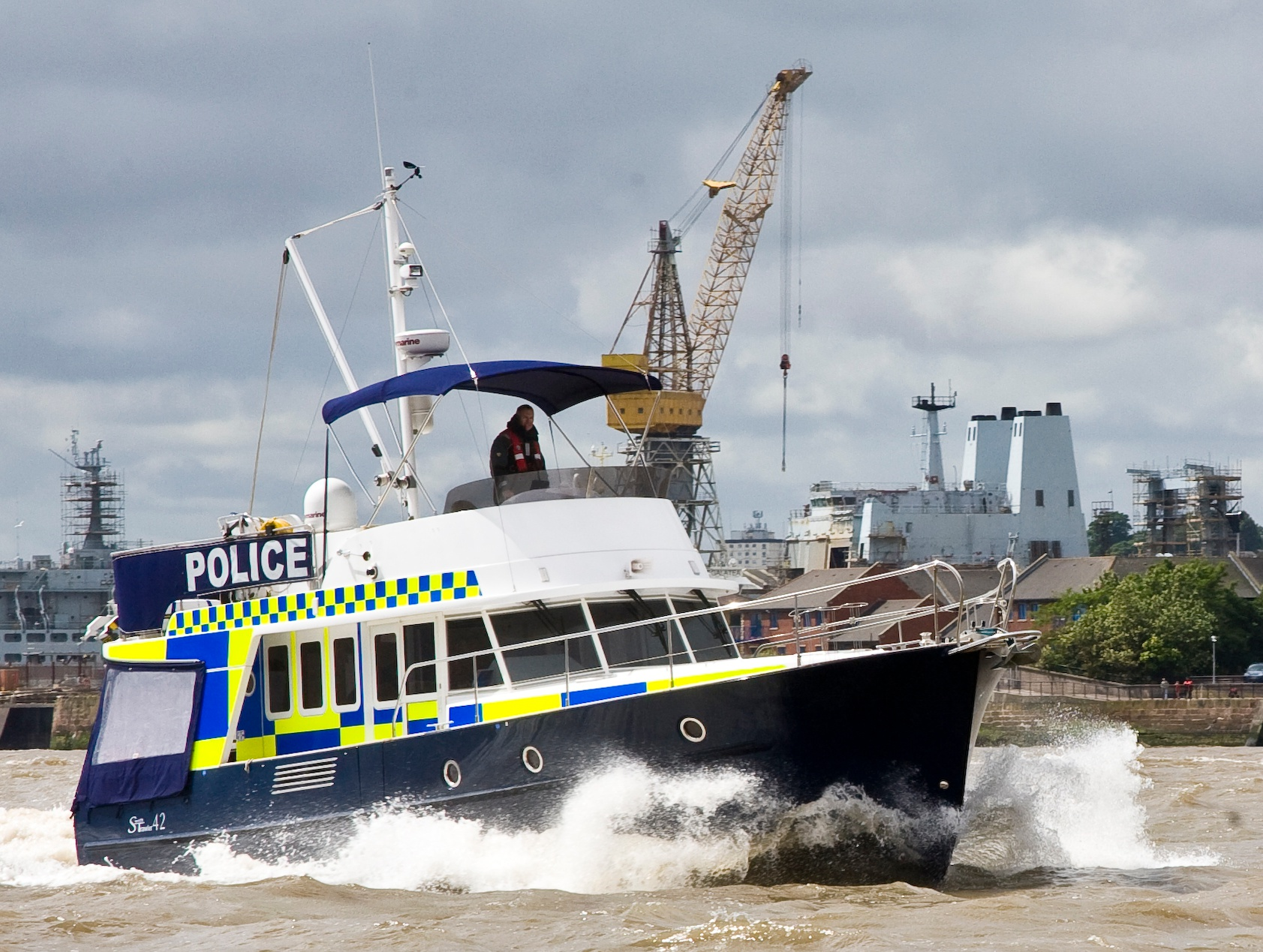
Consortium, one of the vessels used by the UK's North West Police Underwater Search & Marine Unit

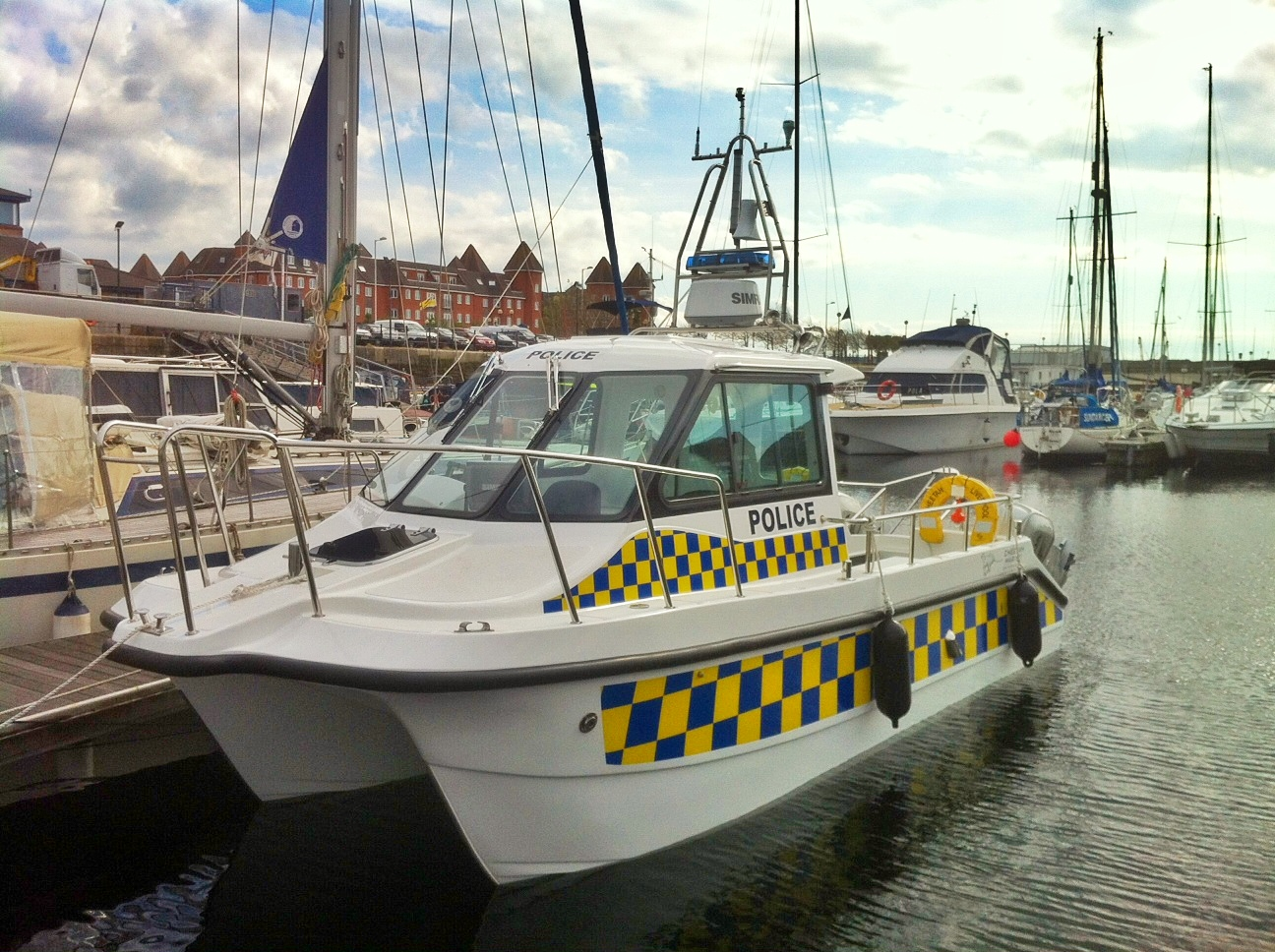
A Cheetah catamaran acquired by the UK's North West Police Underwater Search & Marine Unit in 2012, to be used during the London Olympics

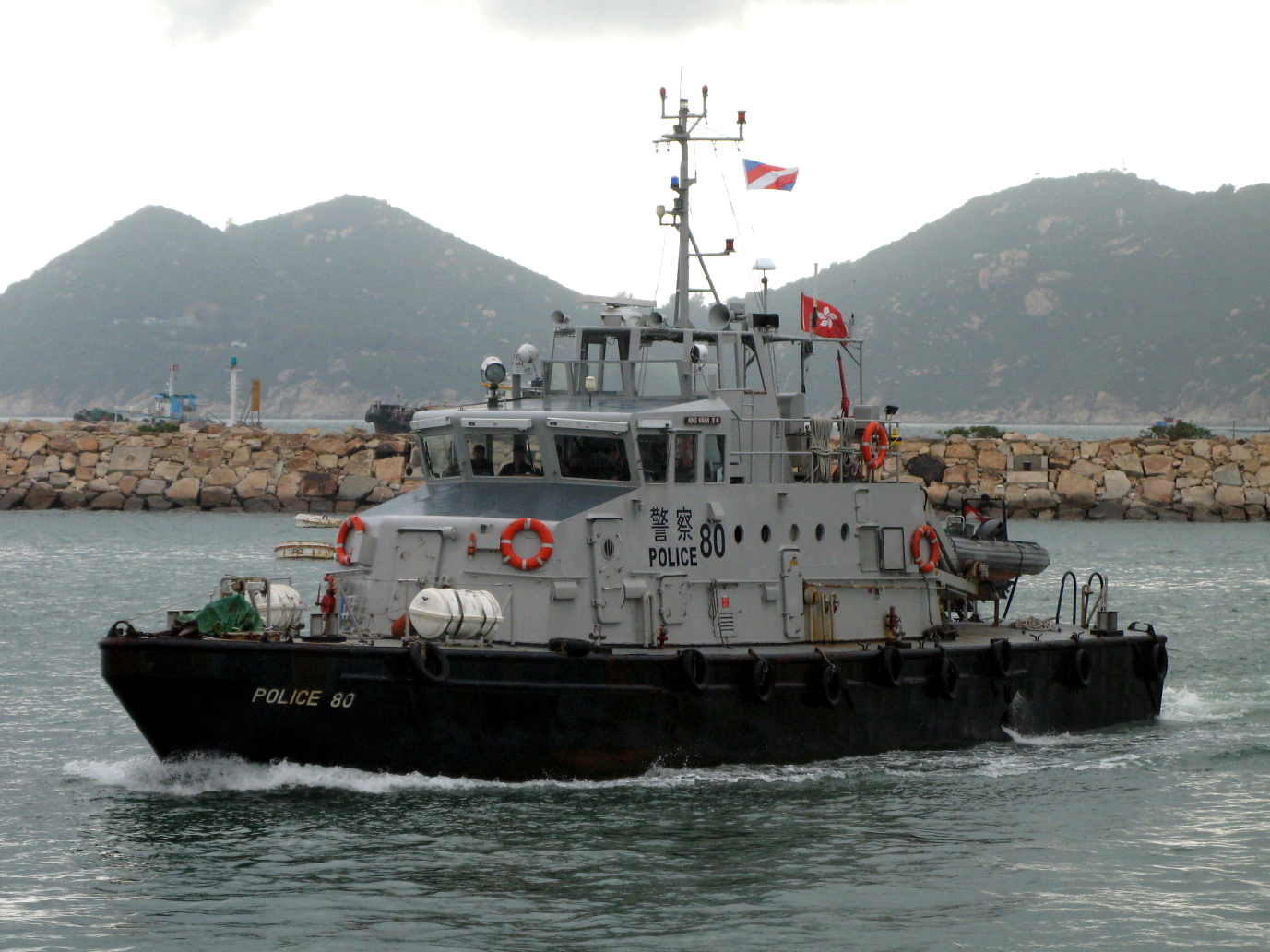
Hong Kong Police Force Marine Region Police Launch 80

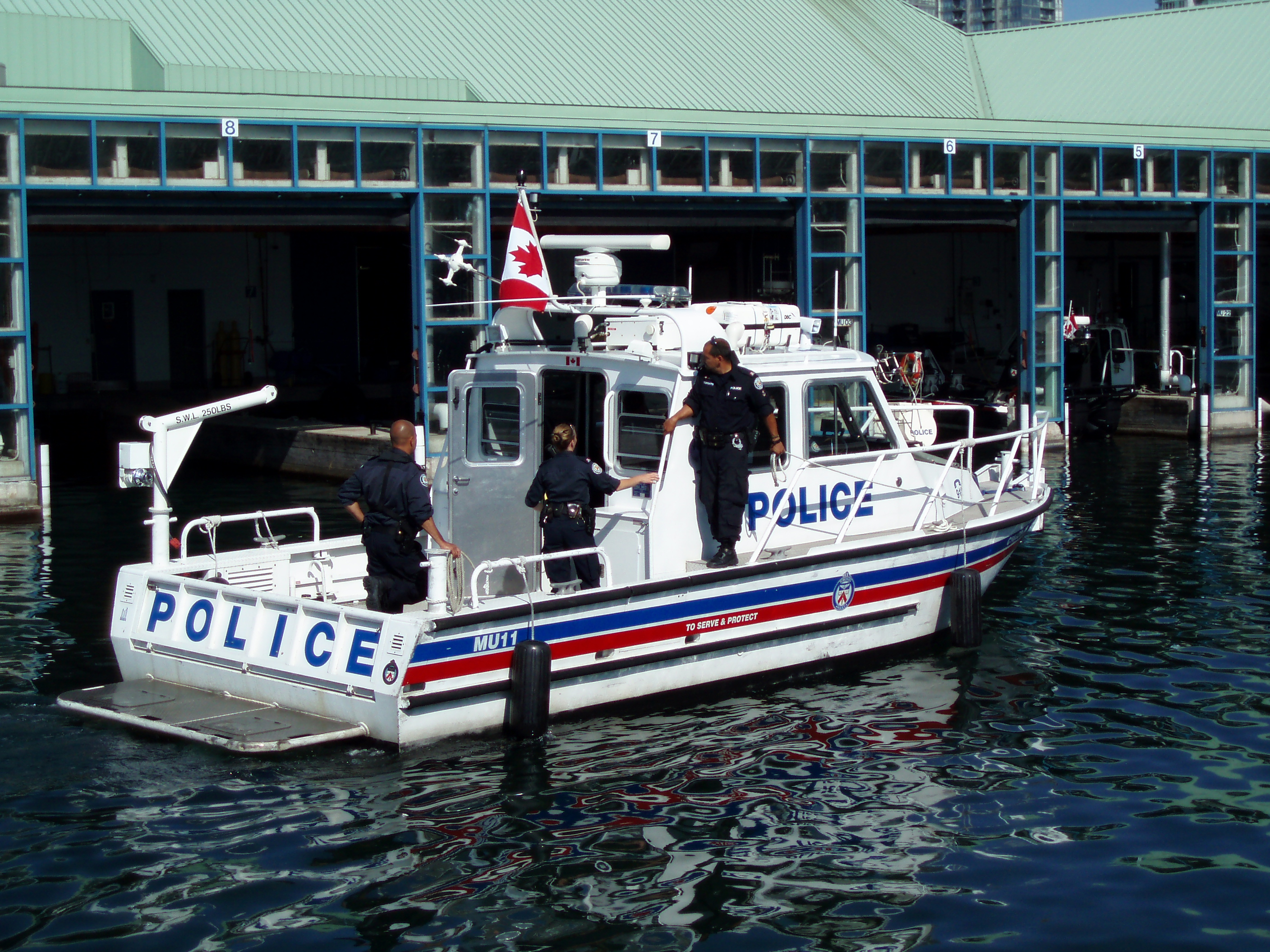
Toronto Police Marine Unit

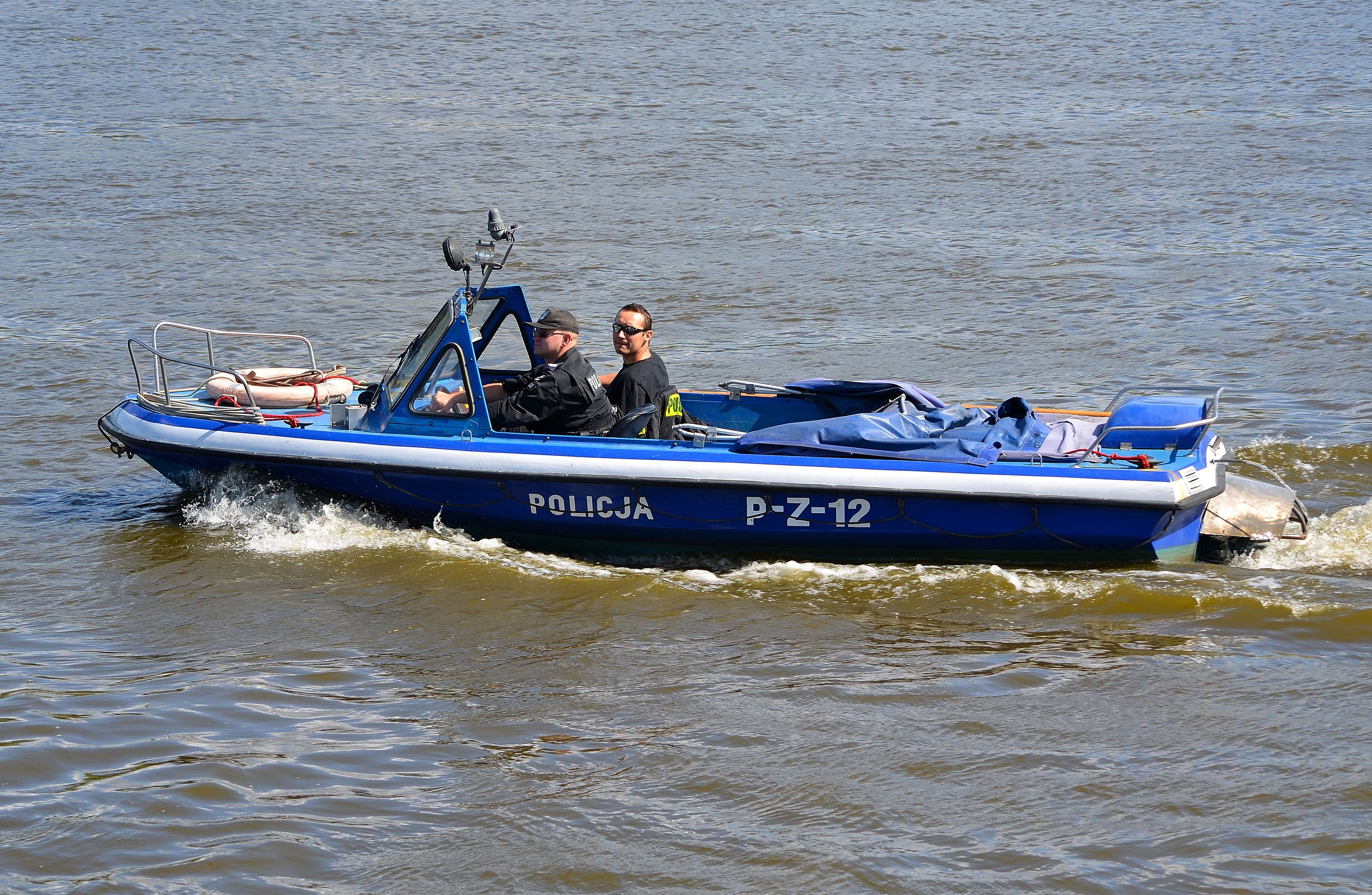
Water police patrol boat on the Vistula river in Warsaw, Poland

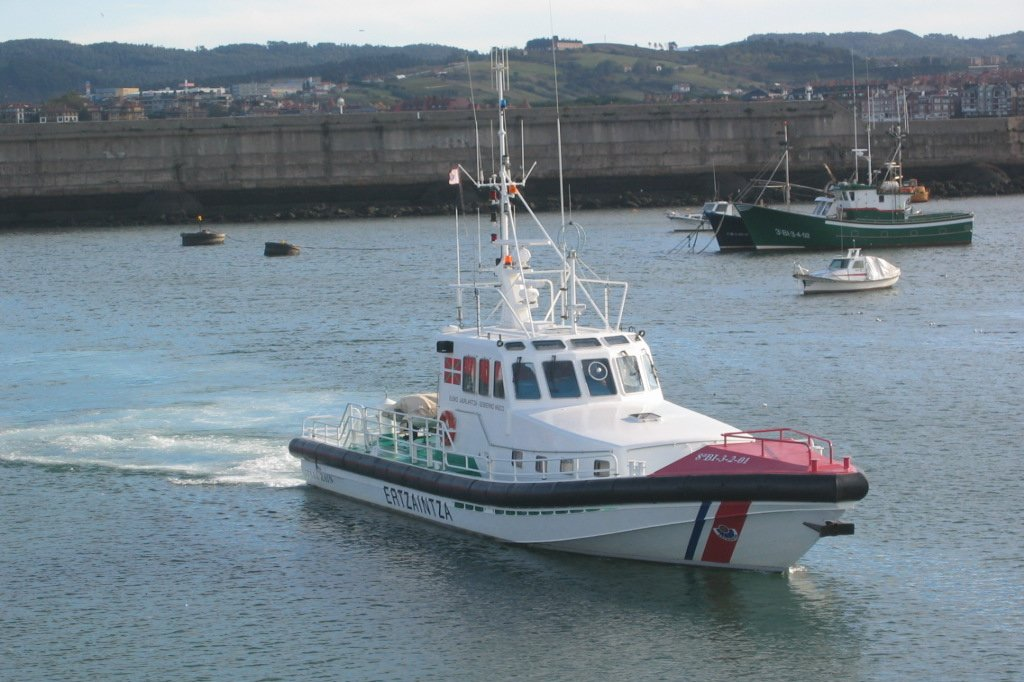
Basque Police (Ertzaintza) Patrol boat

== See also ==
- Coast guard
- Police watercraft
- Water Rats, Australian television series about water police
