= Department of Children and Family Services =

Department of Children and Family Services or the Department of Children and Families may refer to:

State departments:

- Connecticut Department of Children and Families
- Florida Department of Children and Families
- Illinois Department of Children and Family Services
- Kansas Department for Children and Families
- Department of Children and Family Services (Louisiana)
- New York State Office of Children and Family Services

County departments:

- Department of Children and Family Services (Los Angeles County)

== See also ==
- Department of Children, Youth and Families (disambiguation)
