= List of law enforcement agencies in Louisiana =

This is a list of law enforcement agencies in Louisiana.

According to the US Bureau of Justice Statistics' 2008 Census of State and Local Law Enforcement Agencies, the state had 348 law enforcement agencies employing 18,050 sworn police officers, about 405 for each 100,000 residents. This is the largest ratio of policemen to residents of any state and compares to a national average of 251 to 100,000.

== State agencies ==
- Louisiana Department of Children and Family Services
  - Child Support Enforcement
- Louisiana Department of Environmental Quality
- Louisiana Department of Health and Hospitals
  - Louisiana Medical Center Police
- Louisiana Department of Justice
- Louisiana Department of Public Safety
  - Louisiana Division of Levee District Police
    - Atchafalaya Basin Levee District Police Department
    - East Jefferson Levee District Police Department
    - Lafourche Basin Levee District Police Department
    - Lake Borgne Levee District Police Department
    - Orleans Levee District Police Department
    - Pontchartrain Levee District Police Department
    - Tensas Basin Levee District Police Department
  - Louisiana State Fire Marshal
  - Louisiana State Police
- Louisiana Department of Public Safety & Corrections
  - Louisiana Department of Corrections - Adult Probation and Parole
  - Division of Youth Services - Office of Juvenile Justice
- Louisiana Department of Revenue & Taxation
  - Louisiana Alcoholic Beverage Control
- Louisiana Department of Transportation and Development
  - Crescent City Connection Police
  - Weight Enforcement Police
- Louisiana Department of Wildlife & Fisheries - Enforcement Division
- Louisiana Livestock Brand Commission Enforcement
- Louisiana Office of State Parks - Enforcement Division
- Louisiana State Museum Police
- Louisiana Military Department Police
- New Orleans City Park Police

== Parish agencies ==
- Acadia Parish Sheriff's Office
- Allen Parish Sheriff's Office
- Ascension Parish Sheriff's Office
- Assumption Parish Sheriff's Office
- Avoyelles Parish Sheriff's Office
- Beauregard Parish Sheriff's Office
- Bienville Parish Sheriff's Office
- Bossier Parish Sheriff's Office
- Caddo Parish Constable's Office
- Caddo Parish Sheriff's Office
- Calcasieu Parish Sheriff's Office
- Caldwell Parish Sheriff's Office
- Cameron Parish Sheriff's Office
- Catahoula Parish Sheriff's Office
- Claiborne Parish Sheriff's Office
- Concordia Parish Sheriff's Office
- Desoto Parish Sheriff's Office
- East Baton Rouge Parish Sheriff's Office
- East Carroll Parish Sheriff's Office
- East Feliciana Parish Sheriff's Office
- Evangeline Parish Sheriff's Office
- Franklin Parish Sheriff's Office
- Grant Parish Sheriff's Office
- Iberia Parish Sheriff's Office
- Iberville Parish Sheriff's Office
- Jackson Parish Sheriff's Office
- Jefferson Parish Sheriff's Office
- Jefferson Davis Parish Sheriff's Office
- Lafayette Parish Sheriff's Office
- Lafourche Parish Sheriff's Office
- LaSalle Parish Sheriff's Office
- Lincoln Parish Sheriff's Office
- Livingston Parish Sheriff's Office
- Madison Parish Sheriff's Office
- Morehouse Parish Sheriff's Office
- Natchitoches Parish Sheriff's Office
- Orleans Parish Sheriff's Office
- Ouachita Parish Sheriff's Office
- Plaquemines Parish Sheriff's Office
- Pointe Coupee Parish Sheriff's Office
- Rapides Parish Sheriff's Office
- Red River Parish Sheriff's Office
- Richland Parish Parish Sheriff's Office
- Sabine Parish Sheriff's Office
- St. Bernard Parish Sheriff's Office
- St. Charles Parish Sheriff's Office
- St. Helena Parish Sheriff's Office
- St. James Parish Sheriff's Office
- St. John Parish Sheriff's Office
- St. Landry Parish Sheriff's Office
- St. Martin Parish Sheriff's Office
- St. Mary Parish Sheriff's Office
- St. Tammany Parish Sheriff's Office
- Tangipahoa Parish Sheriff's Office
- Tensas Parish Sheriff's Office
- Terrebonne Parish Sheriff's Office
- Union Parish Sheriff's Office
- Vermilion Parish Sheriff's Office
- Vernon Parish Sheriff's Office
- Washington Parish Sheriff's Office
- Webster Parish Sheriff's Office
- West Baton Rouge Parish Sheriff's Office
- West Carroll Parish Sheriff's Office
- West Feliciana Parish Sheriff's Office
- Winn Parish Sheriff's Office

== City / municipal agencies ==
- Abbeville Police Department
- Addis Police Department
- Albany Police Department
- Alexandria Police Department
- Amite Police Department
- Anacoco Police Department
- Angie Police Department
- Arcadia Police Department
- Arnaudville Police Department
- Ashland Police Department
- Athens Police Department
- Baker Police Department
- Baldwin Police Department
- Ball Police Department
- Basile Police Department
- Bastrop Police Department
- Baton Rouge Police Department
- Benton Police Department
- Bernice Police Department
- Berwick Police Department
- Biloxi Police Department
- Blanchard Police Department
- Bogalusa Police Department
- Bonita Police Department
- Bossier City Police Department
- Boyce Police Department
- Breaux Bridge Police Department
- Broussard Police Department
- Brusly Police Department
- Bunkie Police Department
- Calvin Police Department
- Campti Police Department
- Cankton Police Department
- Carencro Police Department
- Castor Police Department
- Central Police Department
- Chataignier Police Department
- Chatham Police Department
- Cheneyville Police Department
- Choudrant Police Department
- Church Point Police Department
- Clerence Police Department
- Clarks Police Department
- Clayton Police Department
- Clinton Police Department
- Colfax Police Department
- Collinston Police Department
- Columbia Police Department
- Converse Police Department
- Covington Police Department
- Cotton Valley Police Department
- Cottonport Police Department
- Coushatta Police Department
- Covington Police Department
- Crowley Police Department
- Cullen Police Department
- Delcambre Police Department
- Delhi Police Department
- Delta Police Department
- Denham Springs Police Department
- DeQuincy Police Department
- DeRidder Police Department
- Dixie Inn Police Department
- Dodson Police Department
- Downsville Police Department
- Doyline Police Department
- Dry Prong Police Department
- Dubach Police Department
- Dubberly Police Department
- Duson Police Department
- East Hodge Police Department
- Elizabeth Police Department
- Elton Police Department
- Epps Police Department
- Erath Police Department
- Estherwood Police Department
- Eunice Police Department
- Eunice City Marshal's Office
- Evergreen Police Department
- Farmerville Police Department
- Fenton Police Department
- Ferriday Police Department
- Fisher Police Department
- Florien Police Department
- Folsom Police Department
- Fordoche Police Department
- Forest Police Department
- Forest Hill Police Department
- Franklin Police Department
- Franklinton Police Department
- French Settlement Police Department
- Georgetown Police Department
- Gibsland Police Department
- Gilbert Police Department
- Gilliam Police Department
- Glenmora Police Department
- Golden Meadow Police Department
- Goldonna Police Department
- Gonzales Police Department
- Grambling Police Department
- Gramercy Police Department
- Grand Cane Police Department
- Grand Coteau Police Department
- Grand Isle Police Department
- Grayson Police Department
- Greensburg Police Department
- Greenwood Police Department
- Gretna Police Department
- Grosse Tete Police Department
- Gueydan Police Department
- Hall Summit Police Department
- Hammond Police Department
- Harahan Police Department
- Harrisonburg Police Department
- Haughton Police Department
- Haynesville Police Department
- Head of Island Police Department
- Heflin Police Department
- Henderson Police Department
- Hessmer Police Department
- Hineston Police Department
- Hodge Police Department
- Homer Police Department
- Hornbeck Police Department
- Hosston Police Department
- Houma Police Department
- Ida Police Department
- Independence Police Department
- Iota Police Department
- Iowa Police Department
- Jackson Police Department
- Jamestown Police Department
- Jean Lafitte Police Department
- Jeanerette Police Department
- Jena Police Department
- Jennings Police Department
- Jonesboro Police Department
- Jonesville Police Department
- Junction City Police Department
- Kaplan Police Department
- Keachi Police Department
- Kenner Police Department
- Kentwood Police Department
- Kilbourne Police Department
- Killian Police Department
- Kinder Police Department
- Krotz Springs Police Department
- Lafayette Police Department
- Lake Arthur Police Department
- Lake Charles Police Department
- Lake Providence Police Department
- LeCompte Police Department
- Leesville Police Department
- Leonville Police Department
- Lille Police Department
- Lisbon Police Department
- Livingston Police Department
- Livonia Police Department
- Lockport Police Department
- Logansport Police Department
- Longstreet Police Department
- Loreauville Police Department
- Lucky Police Department
- Lutcher Police Department
- Madisonville Police Department
- Mamou Police Department
- Mandeville Police Department
- Mangham Police Department
- Mansfield Police Department
- Mansura Police Department
- Many Police Department
- Maringouin Police Department
- Marion Police Department
- Marksville Police Department
- Martin Police Department
- Maurice Police Department
- McNary Police Department
- Melville Police Department
- Mer Rouge Police Department
- Mermentau Police Department
- Merryville Police Department
- Minden Police Department
- Monroe Police Department
- Montgomery Police Department
- Montpelier Police Department
- Mooringsport Police Department
- Moreauville Police Department
- Morgan City Police Department
- Morganza Police Department
- Morse Police Department
- Mound Police Department
- Natchez Police Department
- Natchitoches Police Department
- New Iberia Police Department
- New Llano Police Department
- New Orleans Police Department
- New Roads Police Department
- Newellton Police Department
- Noble Police Department
- North Hodge Police Department
- Norwood Police Department
- Oak Grove Police Department
- Oak Ridge Police Department
- Oakdale Police Department
- Oberlin Police Department
- Oil City Police Department
- Olla Police Department
- Opelousas Police Department
- Palmetto Police Department
- Parks Police Department
- Patterson Police Department
- Pearl River Police Department
- Pine Prairie Police Department
- Pineville Police Department
- Pioneer Police Department
- Plain Dealing Police Department
- Plaquemine Police Department
- Plaucheville Police Department
- Pleasant Hill Police Department
- Pollock Police Department
- Ponchatoula Police Department
- Port Allen Police Department
- Port Barre Police Department
- Port Vincent Police Department
- Powhatan Police Department
- Provencal Police Department
- Quitman Police Department
- Rayne Police Department
- Rayville Police Department
- Reeves Police Department
- Richmond Police Department
- Richwood Police Department
- Ridgecrest Police Department
- Ringgold Police Department
- Robeline Police Department
- Rodessa Police Department
- Rosedale Police Department
- Roseland Police Department
- Rosepine Police Department
- Ruston Police Department
- St. Francisville Police Department
- St. Gabriel Police Department
- St. Joseph Police Department
- St. Martinville Police Department
- Saline Police Department
- Sarepta Police Department
- Scott Police Department
- Shongaloo Police Department
- Shreveport Police Department
- Sibley Police Department
- Sicily Island Police Department
- Sikes Police Department
- Simmesport Police Department
- Simpson Police Department
- Simsboro Police Department
- Slaughter Police Department
- Slidell Police Department
- South Mansfield Police Department
- Spearsville Police Department
- Springfield Police Department
- Springhill Police Department
- Stanley Police Department
- Sterlington Police Department
- Stonewall Police Department
- Sulphur Police Department
- Sun Police Department
- Sunset Police Department
- Tallulah Police Department
- Tangipahoa Police Department
- Thibodaux Police Department
- Tickfaw Police Department
- Tullos Police Department
- Turkey Creek Police Department
- Urania Police Department
- Varnado Police Department
- Vidalia Police Department
- Vienna Police Department
- Ville Platte Police Department
- Vinton Police Department
- Vivian Police Department
- Walker Police Department
- Washington Police Department
- Waterproof Police Department
- Welsh Police Department
- West Monroe Police Department
- Westlake Police Department
- Westwego Police Department
- White Castle Police Department
- Wilson Police Department
- Winnfield Police Department
- Winnsboro Police Department
- Wisner Police Department
- Woodworth Police Department
- Youngsville Police Department
- Zachary Police Department
- Zwolle Police Department

== College and university agencies ==
- Dillard University Police Department
- Grambling State University Police Department
- McNeese State University Police Department
- Louisiana State University Police Department
- Louisiana State University Health Sciences Center-New Orleans Police
- Louisiana State University at Alexandria Police Department
- Louisiana State University at Shreveport Police Department
- Louisiana Tech University Police Department
- Loyola University New Orleans Public Safety Department
- Nicholls State University Police Department
- Northwestern State University Police Department
- Southeastern Louisiana University Police Department
- Southwestern Louisiana University Police Department
- Southern University Police Department
- Southern University at New Orleans Police Department
- Southern University Shreveport Police Department
- Tulane University Police Department
- Tulane University Health Sciences Center Police Department
- University of Louisiana at Lafayette Police Department
- The University of Louisiana at Monroe Police Department
- University of New Orleans Police Department
- Xavier University of Louisiana Police Department

== Other agencies ==
- Housing Authority of New Orleans Police Department
- Greater Lafourche Port Commission’s Port Fourchon Harbor Police Department
- Greater New Orleans Expressway Commission’s Causeway Police Department
- Office of the United States Marshal for the Eastern District of Louisiana
- Office of the United States Marshal for the Middle District of Louisiana
- Office of the United States Marshal for the Western District of Louisiana
- Port of New Orleans Police Department
