= OCSO (disambiguation) =

OCSO is the abbreviation for the Order of Cistercians of the Strict Observance (a.k.a. 'Trappists'), a French religious order.

OCSO may also refer to:

- Ocean County Sheriff's Office, a US law enforcement agency in New Jersey
- Office of the Chief of Space Operations, a US government agency
- Orange County Sheriff's Office (Florida), a US law enforcement agency
