= Department of Children, Youth and Families =

Department of Children, Youth and Families can refer to:

- Delaware Department of Services for Children, Youth, and Their Families
- New Mexico Children, Youth, and Families Department
- Rhode Island Department of Children, Youth & Families
- Washington Department of Children, Youth, and Families

== See also ==
- Department of Children and Family Services
