= Levee District Police =

Louisiana county police

The Levee District Police (French: Police du District de Levee) is the law enforcement agency responsible for the safety and protection of the Louisiana state levee system. There are several variations of Levee District police offices in the state. Each operates in their own respective districts. The officers are under the state's Classified Service and commissioned State Police Special Agents as peace officers by the Louisiana Department of Public Safety and Corrections, Louisiana State Police. They have statewide arrest and investigative power. In addition to providing general law enforcement, the Levee District Police Division enforces the following laws:

- Title 14 (Criminal Code)
- Title 30 (Environmental Laws)
- Title 32 (Highway Regulation Law)
- Title 34 (Navigation and Shipping Laws)
- Title 38 (Levee County Law)
- Title 40 (Illegal Narcotics and Weapons)
- Title 56 (Fish and games)

== Enforcement ==
They also enforce the provisions of the Federal Rivers and Harbors Act and other regulations. Their primary mission is homeland security for the protection of federal levees, waterways, ports, waterfront areas, marinas, bridges, and adjacent highways and roads in these areas. They carry out complex criminal investigations and gather criminal intelligence. In addition, officers are trained in search and rescue and regularly respond to emergencies. The area assigned to a given officer may consist of multiple parishes or counties within the state. Officers work in uniform or undercover and generally work independently of other officers. Agents use special SUV vehicles that have four-wheel drive capabilities. Also, they use ATVs and other special four-wheeled off-road vehicles that allow them to access off-road locations. The Levee District Police also provides waterway law enforcement. This is achieved with both patrol boats and vehicle patrols in accessible coastal areas. Special marine vessels equipped for maritime law enforcement duties enable officers to perform their duties. All officers carry a variety of weapons which include fully automatic machine guns, special tactical shotguns, sniper rifles, tasers, carbines and semi-automatic pistols. The Levee District Police make an important contribution to homeland security efforts. The Division is a member of the U.S. Coast Guard Area Maritime Security Committee, U.S. Department of Justice Counterterrorism Advisory Board, FBI Infragard and the United States Department of Homeland Security Critical Infrastructure Advisory Council. These law enforcement officers are specially trained in tactical intervention. The Levee District Police have both Land and Sea Special Response Team (SWAT) capabilities through the integrated use of land and sea units.

== Controversy ==
- In May 2022, a patrol vehicle of the Levee District Police was stolen and recovered in New Orleans.
- In October 2022, several Orleans Levee District officers were accused of fraud by a local yacht club. The yacht club contracted with the officers for off-duty security work. The club alleged that the officers either showed up late or not at all, and still billed them the full amount. Three officers and a sergeant were arrested as a result.

== See also ==
- List of law enforcement agencies in Louisiana
