= Ocean County Sheriff's Office =

Agency overview
- Legal personality: Governmental: Government agency

Jurisdictional structure
- Operations jurisdiction: Ocean County, New Jersey, United States
- Population: 576,567
- General nature: Local civilian police

Operational structure
- Headquarters: 120 Hooper Ave, Toms River, NJ 08753
- Agency executive: Michael G. Mastronardy, Sheriff

Website
- OCSD Website

The Ocean County Sheriff's Office or OCSO is the law enforcement agency for Ocean County, New Jersey, in the United States.

== History ==
In the 1970s, the Ocean County Sheriff's Office started its Criminal Investigations Unit. In 1979, the Department's Criminal Identification Bureau implemented a high-speed information retrieval system for storage and retrieval of photos and fingerprint information, becoming the first law enforcement agency in New Jersey to use this technology. In the 1980s the department added a forensics team. This team in 1981 was among the first to use crazy glue for the detection of latent prints. That same year the force was also the first in New Jersey to use a laser in an investigation. The department has reported that its crime lab is renowned and has been used by the FBI and in training the United States Secret Service. Later in 1991 the department was the first to have its own in-house DNA testing. The OCSD has the highest number of hits for finger print databases.

== Community involvement ==
In 2011, their ongoing Children's Identification Program fingerprinted and photographed 31,350 children. The office supplies DARE officers to schools that request them, and don't have them provided by local police already. They hold an annual Ocean County Sheriff’s Department Food and Toy Drive.
