= Department of Children and Family Services (Louisiana) =

Department of Children and Family Services (DSS or DCFS) is a state agency of Louisiana. It deals with child welfare, adoption, and family services.

It replaced the former Department of Social Services (DSS).
