= Louisiana Highway 125 =

State highway in Louisiana, United States

Louisiana Highway 125

- Route of LA 125 highlighted in red

Route information
- Maintained by Louisiana DOTD
- Length: 12.514 mi (20.139 km)
- Existed: 1955 renumbering–present

Major junctions
- South end: US 165 in Tullos
- US 84 in Tullos
- North end: US 165 northeast of Olla

Location
- Country: United States
- State: Louisiana
- Parishes: LaSalle, Caldwell

Highway system
- Louisiana State Highway System; Interstate; US; State; Scenic
← LA 124	→ LA 126

Louisiana Highway 125 (LA 125) is a state highway located in LaSalle Parish, Louisiana, United States. It runs 12.51 miles (20.13 km) in a southwest to northeast direction from U.S. Highway 165 (US 165) in Tullos to a second junction with US 165 northeast of Olla.

The entire route parallels US 165, one of the state's major north–south highways, between Alexandria and Monroe. LA 125 passes through the small communities of Tullos, Urania, and Olla, whose centers are bypassed by US 165. In Tullos, the route intersects US 84, an east–west highway connecting to the nearby parish seats of Winnfield and Jena. Though the route serves an overall north–south function, signage for LA 125 does not carry directional banners.

LA 125 was the original route of US 165 through LaSalle Parish. Some junctions along the route include signage identifying it as the "historic route" of the highway.

== Route description ==
From the southwest, LA 125 begins at an intersection with US 165 just inside Tullos, a small town in northwestern LaSalle Parish. US 165 connects to Alexandria on the south and Monroe on the north. LA 125 briefly proceeds northwest along South Main Street. At Fullerton Road, the highway turns northeast and continues along South Main Street to the town's main junction, an intersection with US 84. US 84 connects to Jena, the parish seat, as well as Winnfield, the parish seat of neighboring Winn Parish.

LA 125 continues northeast along Main Street, exiting Tullos and intersecting LA 125 Spur, which connects to the parallel US 165. Soon afterward, LA 125 curves to the north briefly before resuming its northeastern course across a bridge over Chickasaw Creek. The highway then approaches and begins to run parallel to the Union Pacific Railroad (UP) tracks into the town of Urania. Here, LA 125 intersects LA 3259 (East Hardtner Drive), the town's connection to US 165. LA 125 turns northwest, briefly continuing the route of LA 3259 across the UPRR tracks before curving northeast onto Tannehill Drive. The highway continues for 1.0 mile (1.6 km) through a residential area, at which point it crosses the town limits at Pentecostal Church Road. Shortly afterward, LA 125 passes by a large lumber mill.

1.1 miles (1.8 km) later, LA 125 intersects LA 124, and the two highways begin a concurrency into the town of Olla. Here, the roadway rejoins the railroad tracks and becomes known as Front Street. Reaching the town center, LA 125 intersects LA 127 (Central Avenue), another connection to Jena. While LA 125 proceeds northeast along the railroad, LA 124 crosses the tracks via Central Avenue, ending the concurrency with LA 125. After several blocks, Olla's historic commercial buildings disappear, and the surroundings become rural once again. 0.4 miles (0.64 km) past the town limit, LA 125 passes through a point known as Standard, where it makes a sharp curve to the opposite side of the UPRR tracks. The route continues northeast for a final 1.3 miles (2.1 km), where it crosses into Caldwell Parish and immediately rejoins US 165.

The route is classified as a rural major collector by the Louisiana Department of Transportation and Development (La DOTD). The posted speed limit is generally 55 mph (90 km/h) between points, reduced to 35 mph (55 km/h) or 25 mph (40 km/h) through town. Average daily traffic volume in 2013 is reported as 850 vehicles for the majority of the route, running from US 84 in Tullos to Standard. The southern and northern ends of the route have lower counts of 550 and 570 vehicles, respectively. LA 125 is an undivided, two-lane highway for its entire length.

== History ==
In the original Louisiana Highway system in use between 1921 and 1955, the modern LA 125 was originally part of State Route 14, which followed the Lone Star Route from Alexandria to the Arkansas state line northeast of Bastrop. In 1926, this became part of the original route of US 165, which duplicated Route 14 north of Alexandria. Between the late 1940s and mid-1950s, US 165 was relocated in northwestern LaSalle Parish to bypass the communities along the Missouri Pacific (now the Union Pacific) railroad line. This straightened the route and eliminated several grade crossings. The current alignment bypassing Urania and Olla opened around 1949 with the former alignment becoming State Route C-2113. The present LA 125 Spur connected the old and new alignments until the completion of the Tullos bypass after the 1955 Louisiana Highway renumbering.

LA 125 was created in the 1955 renumbering following the portion of former State Route C-2113 running through Urania and Olla to the Caldwell Parish line.

Class "B": La 125—From a junction with La-US 165 at or near Urania to a junction with La 124 at or near Olla.
Class "C": La 125—From a junction with La 124 at or near Olla northeast to a junction with La-US 165 at or near the Caldwell Parish line.

— 1955 legislative route description

At this time, the route began at the present intersection of US 165 and LA 3259 in Urania. LA 125 followed LA 3259 into the center of town then turned northeast and proceeded along its present route to US 165 at the parish line. By 1958, the relocation of US 165 had been extended southwest to bypass Tullos with the LA 125 designation extended over the old route through town. Since then, the route of LA 125 has remained the same. The two roads connecting US 165 with LA 125 at Urania and a point northeast of Tullos remained in the state highway system and were later designated as spur routes of LA 125. Due to their close proximity, the Urania spur has since been renumbered as LA 3259.

== Future ==
La DOTD is currently engaged in a program that aims to transfer about 5,000 miles (8,000 km) of state-owned roadways to local governments over the next several years. Under this plan of "right-sizing" the state highway system, the route of LA 125 is proposed to be shortened on either end, retaining the middle section between US 84 in Tullos and LA 127 in Olla. LA 125 Spur is also proposed for deletion as it does not meet a significant interurban travel function.

== Major intersections ==
Parish	Location	mi	km	Destinations	Notes
LaSalle	Tullos	0.000– 0.017	0.000– 0.027	US 165 – Alexandria, Monroe	Southern terminus
LaSalle	Tullos	1.502– 1.573	2.417– 2.531	US 84 – Jena, Winnfield	
LaSalle		2.442	3.930	LA 125 Spur to US 165	Western terminus of LA 125 Spur
LaSalle	Urania	4.968	7.995	LA 3259 (East Hardtner Drive)	Western terminus of LA 3259
LaSalle		8.011– 8.110	12.892– 13.052	LA 124 west – Winnfield	South end of LA 124 concurrency
LaSalle	Olla	9.460	15.224	LA 124 east / LA 127 (Central Avenue) – Jena, Sikes	North end of LA 124 concurrency
Caldwell		12.497– 12.514	20.112– 20.139	US 165 – Alexandria, Monroe	Northern terminus
1.000 mi = 1.609 km; 1.000 km = 0.621 mi: Concurrency terminus

== Spur routes ==
=== Tullos (current) ===
Louisiana Highway 125 Spur
- Location: Tullos
- Length: 0.592 mi (953 m)
- Existed: c. 1957–present

Louisiana Highway 125 Spur (LA 125 Spur) runs 0.59 miles (0.95 km) in an east–west direction, connecting LA 125 with US 165 northeast of Tullos.

The route was created shortly after the 1955 Louisiana Highway renumbering when US 165 was moved onto its present route bypassing Tullos. Before the bypass was opened, US 165 curved onto what is now LA 125 via the present spur route and followed LA 125 through town. At this time, LA 125 ended in Urania, connecting to US 165 via the present LA 3259, which was formerly also designated as LA 125 Spur.

The entire route is in LaSalle Parish.

mi	km	Destinations	Notes
0.000	0.000	LA 125 – Tullos	Western terminus
0.576– 0.592	0.927– 0.953	US 165 – Alexandria, Monroe	Eastern terminus
1.000 mi = 1.609 km; 1.000 km = 0.621 mi

=== Urania (former) ===
Louisiana Highway 125 Spur
- Location: Urania
- Length: 0.961 mi (1,547 m)
- Existed: c. 1957–1991

Louisiana Highway 125 Spur (LA 125 Spur) ran 0.96 miles (1.54 km) in a northwest to southeast direction along the present LA 3259 (East Hardtner Drive), connecting LA 125 with US 165 in Urania.

Like the current LA 125 Spur, the route was created shortly after the 1955 Louisiana Highway renumbering when US 165 was moved onto its present route bypassing the nearby town of Tullos. Before the bypass was opened, LA 125 began at the present intersection of US 165 and LA 3259. It followed LA 3259 into town where it joined the current route and proceeded northeast toward Olla. After the re-routing of US 165, LA 125 was extended over its former route through Tullos. The connection between US 165 and Urania became a spur route of LA 125 until 1991, when it was renumbered to LA 3259 due to its close proximity to the other LA 125 Spur near Tullos.

The entire highway was in Urania, LaSalle Parish.

mi	km	Destinations	Notes
0.000	0.000	LA 125 (East Hardtner Drive, South Pine Street)	Western terminus
0.944– 0.961	1.519– 1.547	US 165 – Alexandria, Monroe	Eastern terminus
1.000 mi = 1.609 km; 1.000 km = 0.621 mi
