= Jena Six =

Six black teenagers in Louisiana, convicted in a 2006 beating

The Jena Six were six black teenagers in Jena, Louisiana, United States, convicted in the 2006 beating of Justin Barker, a white student at the local Jena High School, which they also attended. Barker was injured on December 4, 2006, by the members of the Jena Six, and received treatment at an emergency room. While the case was pending, it was often cited by some media commentators as an example of racial injustice in the United States. Some commentators believed that the defendants had been charged initially with too-serious offenses and had been treated unfairly.

A number of events had taken place in and around Jena in the months before the Barker assault, which the media have associated with an alleged escalation of local racial tensions. These events included: the hanging of rope nooses from a tree in the high school courtyard, two violent confrontations between white and black youths, and the destruction by arson of the main building of Jena High School. Extensive news coverage related to the Jena Six often reported these events as linked. Federal and parish attorneys concluded from their investigations that assessment was inaccurate for some of the events; for instance, the burning of the high school was an attempt to destroy grade records.

Six students—Robert Bailey, then aged 17; Mychal Bell, then 16; Carwin Jones, then 18; Bryant Purvis, then 17; Jesse Ray Beard, then 14; and Theo Shaw, then 17—were arrested for the assault of Barker. Mychal Bell was initially convicted as an adult of aggravated battery and conspiracy to commit aggravated battery. His convictions were overturned on the grounds that he should have been tried as a juvenile. Before a retrial in juvenile court, Bell pleaded guilty to a reduced charge of simple battery. The other five defendants later pleaded "no contest" to the same offense and were convicted.

The Jena Six case sparked protests by people who considered the arrests and subsequent charges, initially attempted second-degree murder, as excessive and racially discriminatory. The protesters asserted that white Jena youths involved in similar incidents were treated more leniently. On September 20, 2007, between 15,000 and 20,000 protesters marched on Jena in what was described as the "largest civil rights demonstration in years". Related protests were held in other US cities on the same day. Subsequent reactions included songs alluding to the Jena Six, numerous editorials and opinion columns, and congressional hearings.

== Background to the assault ==
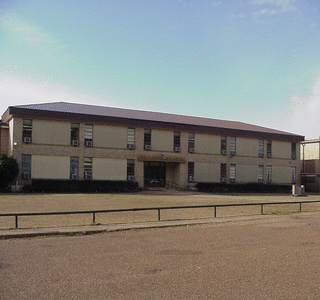
Jena High School

Jena High School is located in the town of Jena, Louisiana, which has about 3,000 people. Some early reporting indicated that students of different races seldom sat together, for instance in the cafeteria, although this has been disputed. According to early reports of the school environment, black students when outside typically sat on bleachers near the auditorium, while white students sat under a large tree in the center of the school courtyard, referred to as the "white tree" or "prep tree". According to some of the school's teachers and administrators, the tree in question was not a "white tree", and students of all races had sat under it at one time or another.

At a school assembly held on August 31, 2006, a black male freshman asked the principal whether he could sit under the tree. According to Donald Washington, United States Attorney for the Western District of Louisiana, the principal said the question was posed in a "jocular fashion". The principal told the students they could "sit wherever they wanted". CNN reported that the freshman and his friends sat under the tree.

=== Noose hanging ===
The following morning, students and staff discovered rope nooses hanging from the tree; reports differ as to whether there were two or three nooses. A black teacher described seeing both white and black students "playing with [the nooses], pulling on them, jump-swinging from them, and putting their heads through them" that same day. Craig Franklin, assistant editor of The Jena Times, said the nooses were hung as a prank by three students directed at white members of the school rodeo team. The school's investigating committee had concluded that "the three young teens had no knowledge that nooses symbolize the terrible legacy of the lynchings of countless blacks in American history". The names of those who hung the nooses were not publicly disclosed.

=== Repercussions ===
The school disciplinary process that followed is unclear. It was reported that the principal, Scott Windham, learned that three white students were responsible and recommended expulsion, that the board of education overruled his recommendation, and that school superintendent Roy Breithaupt agreed with the overruling. It was initially reported that the punishment was reduced to three days of in-school suspension. Under the district's Crisis Management Policy Procedures, the three students were isolated at an alternative school "for about a month", spent two weeks on in-school suspension, served Saturday detentions, had to attend Discipline Court, were referred to Families in Need of Services, and had to have an evaluation before they were able to return to school.

The school superintendent was quoted as saying, "Adolescents play pranks. I don't think it was a threat against anybody". Black residents of Jena have said that this comment stoked racial tensions leading to subsequent events.

According to US Attorney Donald Washington, the Federal Bureau of Investigation (FBI) investigators found that the hanging of the nooses "had all the markings of a hate crime". But, it could not be prosecuted as such since juveniles are rarely prosecuted in the federal system, and this offense did not meet departmental standards for charges to be brought. La Salle Parish District Attorney J. Reed Walters stated that Washington had found no federal statute under which the teens could be prosecuted, just as he had found no applicable state statute. Walters opined: "The people that [hung the nooses] should be ashamed of what they unleashed on this town".

The school called police to the school in the days after the noose incident. The principal called an assembly on September 6, 2006. The Jena Police Department asked Parish Attorney Walters to attend and speak at the assembly. Already pressed for time due to a case under preparation, Walters felt that the students were not paying proper attention to him. He warned them, "I can be your best friend or your worst enemy. With the stroke of a pen I can make life miserable for you or ruin your life. So I want you to call me before you do something stupid". Though black students say Walters was looking at them when he made the comments, Walters and school board member Billy Fowler, also present, deny it. Walters said that he was irritated at "two or three girls, white girls, [who] were chit-chatting on their cellphones or playing with their cellphones".

=== School arson, fight, and confrontation ===
On November 30, 2006, the main building of the high school was destroyed by arson. Although it would be many months before the perpetrators were known, the news media later widely cited the fire as a racially charged event leading up to the assault on Barker. On December 28, 2007, LaSalle Parish Sheriff-elect Scott Franklin announced that an investigation had shown that the fire was set in an effort to destroy grade records in the building and to close the school for a time. Six male suspects (three juveniles and three adults) had been arrested, and two more adult males were being sought. Franklin indicated that the fire was not racially motivated, and had no connection to the Jena Six. Two of the arson defendants pleaded guilty, and were sentenced to ten years in prison, with restitution ordered in the amount of $10 million.

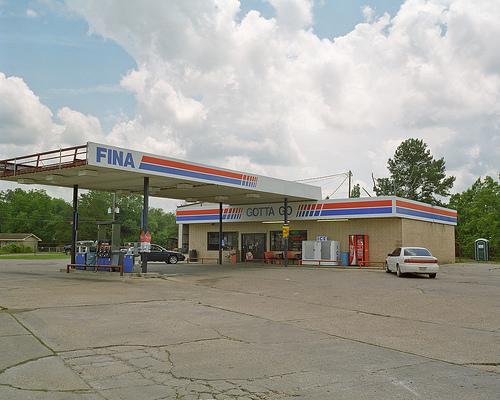
The Gotta Go convenience store outside Jena, Louisiana

On December 1, 2006, a private party was held at the Jena Fair Barn. Bailey and four other black youths tried to enter the party at about 11:00 p.m. According to U.S. Attorney Washington, they were told by a woman that no one was allowed inside without an invitation. The youths persisted, stating that some friends were already at the party. A white male, who was not a student, moved in front of the woman and a fight ensued. After the fight broke up, the woman told both the white male and the black students to leave the party. Once outside, the black students were involved in another fight with a group of white males who were not students. Justin Sloan, a white male, was charged with battery for his role in the fight and was put on probation. Bailey later said that one of the white males broke a beer bottle over his head, but there are no records of Bailey receiving medical treatment.

The following day, an incident occurred at the Gotta Go convenience store, outside Jena in unincorporated LaSalle Parish, between Matt Windham and three black youths, including Bailey. Law enforcement reported that their accounts contradicted each other. Windham alleged that Bailey and his friends chased him, that he ran to get his gun, and that the students wrestled it away from him. According to the black students, as they left the convenience store, they were confronted by Windham with a shotgun. They said they wrestled the gun away from him and fled the scene. Bailey was charged with disturbing the peace, second-degree robbery, and theft of a firearm.

== Attack on Barker ==
A group of black students punched, kicked, and stomped on a white 17-year-old Jena High School student, Justin Barker, on December 4, 2006. The attackers initially claimed that they beat victim Justin Barker because he made a racist joke. Superintendent Breithaupt described the battery as a "premeditated ambush and attack by six students against one. The victim attacked was beaten and kicked into a state of bloody unconsciousness". Barker was released from a local emergency room after three hours of treatment and observation for a concussion and an eye that had swollen shut. The emergency physician's record shows that he also had injuries to his face, ears, and hand. He attended his school's class ring ceremony and dance that evening. He later testified, "I waited 11 years to go to it. I wasn't going to let that get in my way". He left the dance early due to pain. During the trial, Barker testified that his face was badly swollen after the attack and that he suffered a loss of vision in one eye for three weeks. He said that he had suffered recurring headaches and forgetfulness since the attack.

US Attorney Washington stated he did not believe the noose incident and the beatings were related. Walters likewise said that he believed there was no link between the noose incident and the beating. "When this case was brought to me and during our investigation and during the trial, there was no such linkage ever suggested. This compact storyline has only been suggested after the fact." Although Washington believed that both the noose hangings and the Barker battery were symptoms of racial tension, he has also said that there was no apparent lingering anger among students at the school after the nooses were found.

== Criminal cases ==
Law enforcement arrested six students, eventually dubbed the "Jena Six", who were accused in the attack on Barker. Five of them (Robert Bailey Jr., then 17; Mychal Bell, then 16; Carwin Jones, then 18; Bryant Purvis, then 17; and Theo Shaw, then 17) were charged with attempted murder. The sixth student, Jesse Ray Beard (also known as Jesse Rae Beard), was charged as a juvenile. Walters charged Mychal Bell as an adult, although he was only 16, because of his previous criminal record and because Walters believed Bell initiated the attack.

=== Mychal Bell proceedings ===
District Judge J. P. Mauffray Jr. presided over Bell's trial. On the first day of trial, June 26, 2007, Walters reduced the charges to aggravated second-degree battery and conspiracy to commit aggravated second-degree battery. The charge of aggravated battery requires the use of a "dangerous weapon", and Walters argued that the tennis shoes worn by Bell while allegedly kicking Barker were dangerous weapons. A number of witnesses testified that they saw Bell strike Barker, while other witnesses were unsure Bell was involved at all.

Before the trial began, public defender Blane Williams had urged Bell to accept a plea bargain. At trial he rested the defense case without calling any witnesses or offering any evidence. The six members of Bell's jury were all white. The 150-person jury pool included black citizens, who make up 10 percent of the parish's population, but none of the 50 potential jurors who showed up were black. Williams did not challenge the composition of the jury pool.

The jury found Bell guilty, and he faced the possibility of up to 22 years in prison. The judge scheduled sentencing for September 20, 2007. Bell's new defense attorneys, Bob Noel, Walter Lee Perkins Jr., Peggy Sullivan, Louis Scott and Carol Powell-Lexing, requested a new trial on the grounds that Bell should not have been tried as an adult. A request to lower Bell's $90,000 bond was denied on August 24, 2007, due to his juvenile record. Bell had been put on probation for a battery that occurred December 25, 2005. While on probation, he was convicted of another battery charge and two charges of criminal damage to property. One of the battery charges was reportedly for punching a 17-year-old girl in the face. The media had initially reported that Bell had no prior criminal record. On September 4, 2007, Judge Mauffray vacated the conspiracy conviction on the grounds that Bell should have been tried as a juvenile, but he let the battery conviction stand. Bell appealed his conviction, principally on the ground that he had been improperly tried as an adult. On September 14, 2007, Louisiana's Third Circuit Court of Appeals overturned Bell's battery conviction, agreeing that this remaining charge was not among those for which a juvenile may be tried as an adult.

Following the appellate ruling, on September 21, 2007, Judge Mauffray denied the request for Bell to be eligible for bail pending possible further appeal. On September 26, Parish Attorney Walters announced that the prosecution would not appeal the appellate ruling, but would try Bell as a juvenile. Bell was released on $45,000 bond, subject to electronic monitoring and under the supervision of a probation officer.

On October 11, 2007, Mauffray found that Bell had violated the terms of his probation for previous convictions. The judge sentenced Bell to 18 months in a juvenile facility on two counts of simple battery and two counts of criminal destruction of property, and Bell was taken into custody. According to Walters, the matter was unrelated to the assault on Barker, and it had not been referred to during the Barker proceedings. The defense filed a motion to dismiss the Barker charges on the ground that retrying Bell would amount to double jeopardy. On November 8, 2007, Mauffray denied the motion.

Bell's retrial in the Barker assault was scheduled for December 6. Three days before the trial began, he pleaded guilty to a reduced charge of battery, and was sentenced to 18 months in a juvenile facility, with credit for time served. He agreed to testify against any of the other assault defendants at trial. All appeals were dropped as part of the plea agreement.

=== Remaining defendants ===
On September 4, 2007, charges against Carwin Jones and Theo Shaw were reduced to aggravated second-degree battery and conspiracy, as were those of Robert Bailey Jr. on September 10. Bryant Purvis was arraigned on reduced charges of aggravated battery and conspiracy to commit aggravated battery on November 7, 2007, and pleaded not guilty. Because Louisiana law considers seventeen-year-olds to be adults for purposes of criminal culpability, the charges for these four were unaffected by the appellate ruling overturning Bell's conviction.

Proceedings were on hold for some time pending resolution of various motions to require Mauffray to recuse himself. On July 31, 2008, Mauffray was removed from the cases by Judge Thomas Yeager for making questionable comments about the defendants. The Louisiana Supreme Court assigned Judge Yeager to hear the five remaining cases by order signed August 4, 2008. Walters appealed the recusal order, but his appeal was dismissed on March 4, 2009, as moot, or no longer relevant, as Mauffray had left the bench at the end of 2008.

On June 26, 2009, the remaining five defendants entered pleas of "no contest" to a charge of simple battery. The court found them guilty as charged, and sentenced each to a fine of $500 (waived in regards to Shaw due to the time he spent in jail), $500 to be paid as court costs, restitution to be paid to the Barker family (with whom the defendants were ordered to have no contact), and seven days of unsupervised probation. The defendants' lawyers read a statement apologizing to the Barker family and to the town. Addressing the rumors that the attack had been provoked by Barker using a racial epithet, they said on behalf of the defendants:

To be clear, not one of us heard Justin use any slur or say anything that justified Mychal Bell attacking Justin nor did any of us see Justin do anything that would cause Mychal to react.

Yeager, who presided over the plea and sentencing, also ordered the youths to avoid criminal activity, and not to disavow the statement made on their behalf in court. On June 26, it was announced that the civil case by Barker against the Jena Six members had been settled on undisclosed terms. His civil case against the school board was pending.

== Media coverage ==
=== News coverage ===
Initially, the Jena Six were largely ignored by the United States national media, though covered locally and within Louisiana. Both The Jena Times and The Town Talk (a regional newspaper published in Alexandria, Louisiana) covered the story from its inception. A number of African-American bloggers also covered the story before there was mainstream national press coverage. The first piece on the case to be published by an outside source ran on May 9, 2007, in Left Turn, a small alternative news magazine.

The first mainstream US print media outlet to cover the matter was the Chicago Tribune, whose Southwest Bureau Chief, Howard Witt, wrote a piece covering the story on May 20. Witt had received a summary of the situation from Alan Bean, a Texas minister who had founded the advocacy group Friends of Justice. The group sent its document to other reporters and bloggers. In it Bean demanded that outside authorities, not those in LaSalle Parish, deal with the case, and that no incarceration of the defendants occur. Britain's The Observer also featured an article on the case on May 20.

A segment on a BBC program This World followed on May 24. The case began to receive more extensive national media coverage in July 2007, with CNN interviewing Jena residents and parents of those involved. Given the racial history of the Deep South, many news reports from Jena evoked the Civil Rights Movement, referred to historic lynching, or Jim Crow.

Some sources pointed to inaccurate reporting by the media. The Associated Press published an article noting the various reporting errors that have been made, including whether the tree was a "white tree", the number of nooses, and the discipline given to the noose-hanging students. Based on this, MTV posted a retraction for incorrect information that it had reported on the case from other news sources.

=== Columnists and editorials ===
Many major editorial pages and columnists have been sympathetic to the supporters of the Jena Six. They have used the case to discuss broader trends of racism in the US criminal justice system and to call for a renewed civil rights movement. Most editorials were published around the time of the Jena rally. The New York Post, in a September 23, 2007, editorial, stated "it's impossible to examine the case of the so-called Jena Six without concluding that these black teens have been the victims of a miscarriage of justice, with a clearly racial double standard at work". Byron Williams, writing on the Huffington Post, was one of several to cite the Urban League's 2005 finding that the average black male convicted of aggravated assault serves 48 months in prison, one-third longer than a comparable white man. The 2005 report also found that a black male who is arrested is three times more likely to go to jail than a white male arrested for the same crime. Writing in The New York Times, Professor Orlando Patterson of Harvard University used the case to highlight the use of the prison system as a means of "controlling young black men", which is one factor in a broader "crisis in relations between men and women of all classes and, as a result, the catastrophic state of black family life".

Other columnists have argued that inaccuracies in the media coverage unfairly tarnish the town and have led to a national overreaction, part of the tendency in the 24-hour news cycle. Dallas Morning News columnist Heather MacDonald, while condemning the noose hangings as a "despicable provocation", said that "the media, the (race) advocates and pandering politicians have erupted in an outpouring of seeming joy at the alleged proof that America remains a racist country". In a column in the Kansas City Star, Jason Whitlock drew attention to what he called factual inaccuracies in reporting of the story. He focused on the piece circulated by Bean to news outlets, "Bean's story is framed—by his own admission—as an indictment of the criminal justice system and the people in power in Jena and, therefore, the story is unfairly biased". Craig Franklin, assistant editor of The Jena Times, who says that he is the only writer to have covered this story from its inception, wrote in The Christian Science Monitor, "I have never before witnessed such a disgrace in professional journalism. Myths replaced facts ... the truth about Jena will eventually be known".

== Public response ==
The case provoked reactions that the charges against the Jena Six were disproportionate and racially motivated. Supporters of the Jena Six circulated online petitions, raised money for legal defense, and held a demonstration in Jena on September 20, 2007. This event attracted thousands marching in protest.

British rock musician David Bowie donated money.

=== Rallies ===
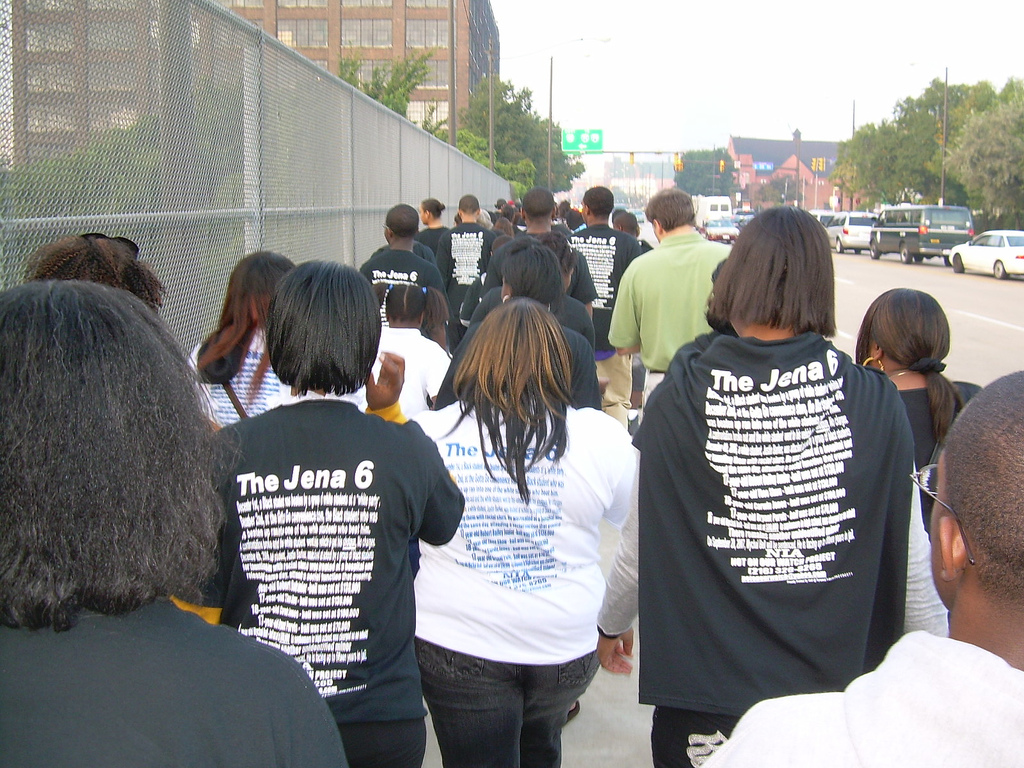
Marchers supporting the Jena Six in Cleveland, Ohio

Rallies in support of the Jena Six were held in Jena on September 20, 2007, the date upon which Bell was scheduled for sentencing. An estimated 15,000 to 20,000 demonstrators attended the rally that day, severely overtaxing the facilities of the small town. Protesters took buses from such distant cities as Los Angeles and Washington, DC. Because of the congestion on the roads leading to Jena, many protesters left their vehicles and continued into town on foot. Attendees included civil rights activists Jesse Jackson, Al Sharpton, and Martin Luther King III, and rappers Mos Def and Salt-n-Pepa. Rapper-actor Ice Cube attended and financially supported the rally. Darryl Hunt, an African American who was wrongfully convicted of the rape and murder of a young white newspaper reporter in 1984, was scheduled as a keynote speaker. The demonstrators were addressed by Darryl Matthews, General President of Alpha Phi Alpha fraternity, who said, "It is sobering to know that in 2007 Martin Luther King's dream of equal treatment, respect, fairness and opportunity is still not realized".

=== Artistic tributes ===
Several songs have been produced in response to the Jena Six case. John Mellencamp released a song and video called "Jena", with lyrics such as "Jena, take your nooses down" which gained considerable media attention, and which Mellencamp described as a "condemnation of racism". The video juxtaposes images of Jena, the high school, and the tree with video from the 1960s, including civil rights marchers and police beatings, video of John F. Kennedy and Martin Luther King Jr. speaking, and an image of a black man in shackles. The song and video led to Jena's mayor, Murphy R. McMillan, issuing a statement rebutting the accusations he believed were expressed and implied in the video. An episode of the Salt-N-Pepa Show on VH1 was filmed at the Jena rally. Bomani Armah released a song called "Jena 6".

Blood at the Root is a play written by Dominique Morisseau about the Jena 6. Blood at the Root premiered on March 28, 2014 at Penn State Center Stage. The story is told through the lens of one of the Jena 6's sister, who also attended the high school. The audience is able to experience the series of events that led up to the convictions from multiple students' unique perspective. It has toured internationally and has been described as "catalyzing conversations on difficult and essential questions of race and justice".

=== Other reactions ===
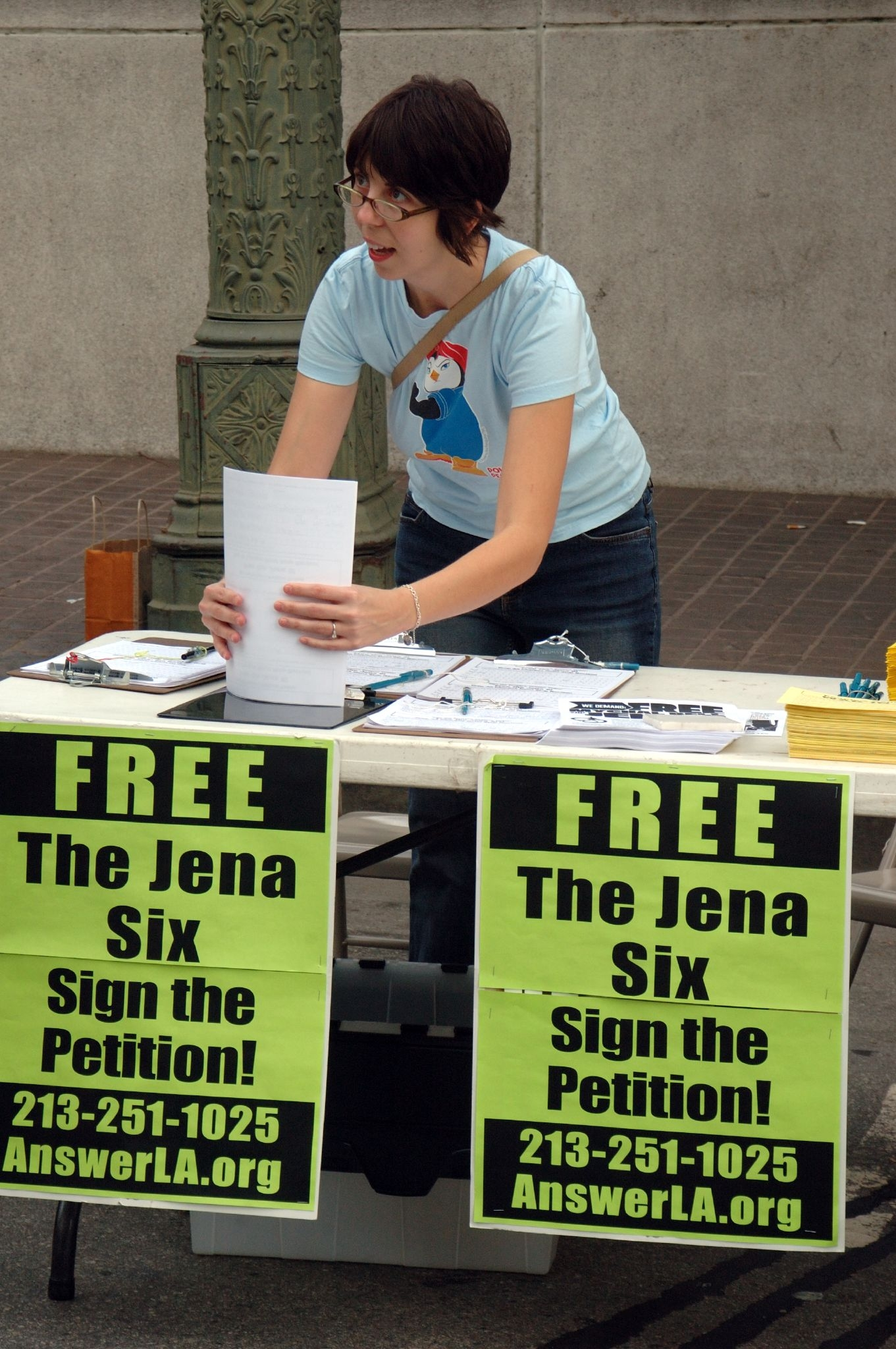
An activist for A.N.S.W.E.R. gathers petition signatures at a Los Angeles rally in October 2007

Many online petitions circulated calling for various actions in response to the Jena Six case. Online advocacy group Color of Change, which had previously advocated for victims of Hurricane Katrina, called for District Attorney Walters to drop all charges and for Governor Kathleen Blanco to investigate his conduct. Color of Change raised more than $212,000 for the Jena Six legal defense, largely through online donations. While the NAACP provided a link to the fund through its website, initially, the donation link on the NAACP Jena Six support page steered potential donors to the generic NAACP donation page, with no way to designate funds for the Jena Six. Black bloggers objected, and several days later, the link was altered to reach the defense fund.

The Southern Poverty Law Center represented Beard, hired local defense counsel to represent Bailey, and helped coordinate the overall defense strategy.

In the months following the Jena Six rally, controversy arose about accounting and dispersal of the legal defense funds. Questions about the money were first sparked by photos posted on Robert Bailey's former MySpace account, which show him with quantities of hundred dollar bills stuffed in his mouth. The controversy expanded when radio host Michael Baisden accused Color of Change of being "shady" with their use of the funds. Color of Change responded to the accusations by posting links to canceled checks on their website. In his November 10 report, Chicago Tribune correspondent Howard Witt noted that Color of Change was the only national civil rights group to be fully transparent with their use of the funds. But Witt raised broader questions about the funds, which totaled more than half a million dollars. He reported that attorneys for Bell claimed that they have yet to receive any money from him, and that the six families had refused to publicly account for the donations.

On September 22, 2007, the FBI opened an investigation of a white supremacist website that listed the addresses of five of the Jena Six and the telephone numbers of some of their families "in case anyone wants to deliver justice". An FBI spokeswoman said the agency believed that the website "essentially called for their lynching". Civil rights advocate Al Sharpton has said that some of the families have continually received threatening and harassing phone calls.

== Later developments ==
On September 25, 2007, Representative John Conyers (D), Chairman of the House Judiciary Committee, announced that he would hold congressional hearings on what he described as "the miscarriages of justice that have occurred in Jena, Louisiana", with the goal of pressuring the United States Department of Justice into taking action. The hearing took place on October 16, 2007; Washington and Sharpton, among others, testified. Walters was invited to testify but declined. Most Republican members of the committee declined to attend. Representative Sheila Jackson Lee (D-Texas) said to Washington and other Justice Department officials, "Shame on you. ... As a parent, I'm on the verge of tears," and said, "I want to know what you're going to do to get Mychal Bell out of jail!" US Attorney Washington responded that the federal government had a limited role to play in the matter.

Representative Lee and other members of the Congressional Black Caucus called upon outgoing Louisiana Governor Blanco to pardon the Jena Six on December 19, 2007, stating that "we believe Mychal Bell and the Jena 6 have paid a sufficient debt to society for any transgressions they may have committed". Blanco's office responded that she cannot grant pardons without a recommendation from the state Pardon Board, and no meeting of that body was scheduled during her remaining term of office. Walters commented that Representative Lee's "passion for racial equality is admirable, but her grasp of the facts is not". He indicated that the attack on Barker was not just a schoolyard fight "but rather an unprovoked, unforeseen assault on a young man who had nothing to do with the hanging of the nooses". Governor Blanco's term of office ended without any pardons being granted.

On July 31, 2007, the school had the controversial tree cut down. School Board member Fowler said, "There's nothing positive about that old tree. It's all negative. And I'm serving on the new School Board, and we're wanting to start fresh on some things". According to Fowler, the tree would have had to have been cut down to make way for the rebuilding of the school after the fire. Others thought that taking down the tree was not an effective way to address any problems of racism in Jena. "Cutting down that beautiful tree won't solve the problem at hand," said Caseptla Bailey, Robert Bailey's mother. "It still happened". The remains of the building have been cleared, and a bid accepted for the reconstruction.

Jones and Purvis attended the BET Hip Hop Awards in Atlanta on October 13, 2007, and were invited to present the award for Video of the Year. When the two defendants came out on stage, they were greeted by a standing ovation. Emcee Katt Williams joked, "They don't look so tough, do they?" The two members delivered speeches thanking family, friends, the "Hip-Hop Nation", and those who came to Jena.

Justin Barker and his parents filed a civil suit on November 29, 2007, against the parents of those accused of beating him, the adult members of the Jena Six (as of the time of the attack), an additional student named Malcolm Shaw, and the LaSalle Parish School Board. Barker's medical bills from his emergency room visit totaled more than $5,000. The lawsuit alleges that the LaSalle Parish School Board inadequately supervised students and failed to maintain discipline. The Barkers also allege that the school board did not implement a plan to "discourage the dangerous activity of threatening and attacking other students while in possession of actual knowledge of said threats and prior attacks while the students are on school grounds".

The case was on hold pending resolution of the criminal cases. When the Barkers' attorney learned that Jesse Ray Beard was using defense funds (which might be garnished under a civil suit) to pay for private school, he decided to push ahead with the case. Following a motion by Bell's civil attorney to recuse Mauffray in the civil case, proceedings were put on hold again pending appointment of a judge to hear that recusal motion. Mauffray subsequently retired. On March 16, 2009, Judge Ronald Lewellyan was assigned to hear the civil case. On June 26, 2009, Judge Lewellyan approved a settlement of Barker's claims against the Jena Six, though the claim against the school board remained pending.

== Jena Six's subsequent activities ==
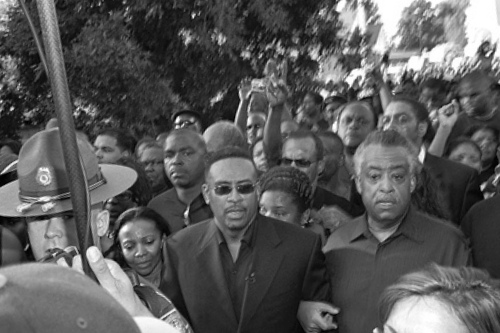
Talk show host Michael Baisden and Al Sharpton, at the front of the September 20, 2007, march in Jena, Louisiana

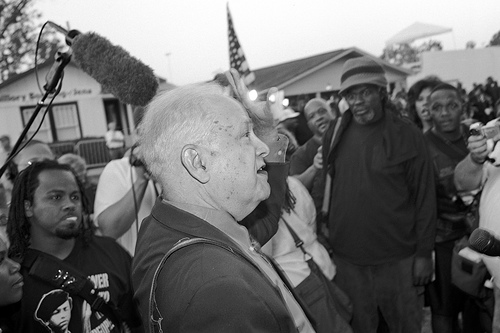
Self-avowed white supremacist Richard Barrett at the September 20, 2007, Jena Six Rally

On August 6, Judge Yeager terminated Beard's probation (he remained under the conditions of his bail release in the Barker incident) so he could attend the Canterbury School in Connecticut. Half of the $39,900 annual tuition was paid for with Jena Six defense fund money. At Canterbury, Beard played on the basketball, baseball, and football teams and graduated in 2010.

On May 10, Bell was stopped in Olla, Louisiana, for speeding and not having proper vehicle insurance while on a weekend pass from his sentence. In an interview televised on CNN on August 24, 2008, Bell admitted to having struck Barker in 2006 and described Jena as "a real racist town". On August 27, 2008, the Louisiana High School Athletic Association turned down Bell's request for an extra year of athletic eligibility. Marcus Jones, Bell's father, blamed Bell's attorney at the time of the plea agreement for the denial. "If it weren't for his attorney, Mychal would be able to play football", Jones said. "They coerced him into taking that plea agreement. If he wouldn't have taken that plea, he wouldn't be in the position he's in now". In 2014, Bell was attending Southern University in Baton Rouge.

Robert Bailey attended high school at Shaw High School in Columbus, Georgia, where he was granted an extra year's eligibility to play football.

Theo Shaw was able to attend classes at another high school and have his credits transferred to Jena. He received a Jena High School diploma although he took part in the graduation ceremony at the other school. On June 3, 2018, he graduated from the University of Washington School of Law, having received a full scholarship as a Gates Public Service Law Scholar. As of 2025, Shaw is Staff Attorney in the Trial Division at the Public Defender Service for the District of Columbia.
