= Dewey W. Wills Wildlife Management Area =

Protected area in Louisiana, United States

- Dewey Wills Wildlife Management Area
- IUCN category V (protected landscape/seascape)
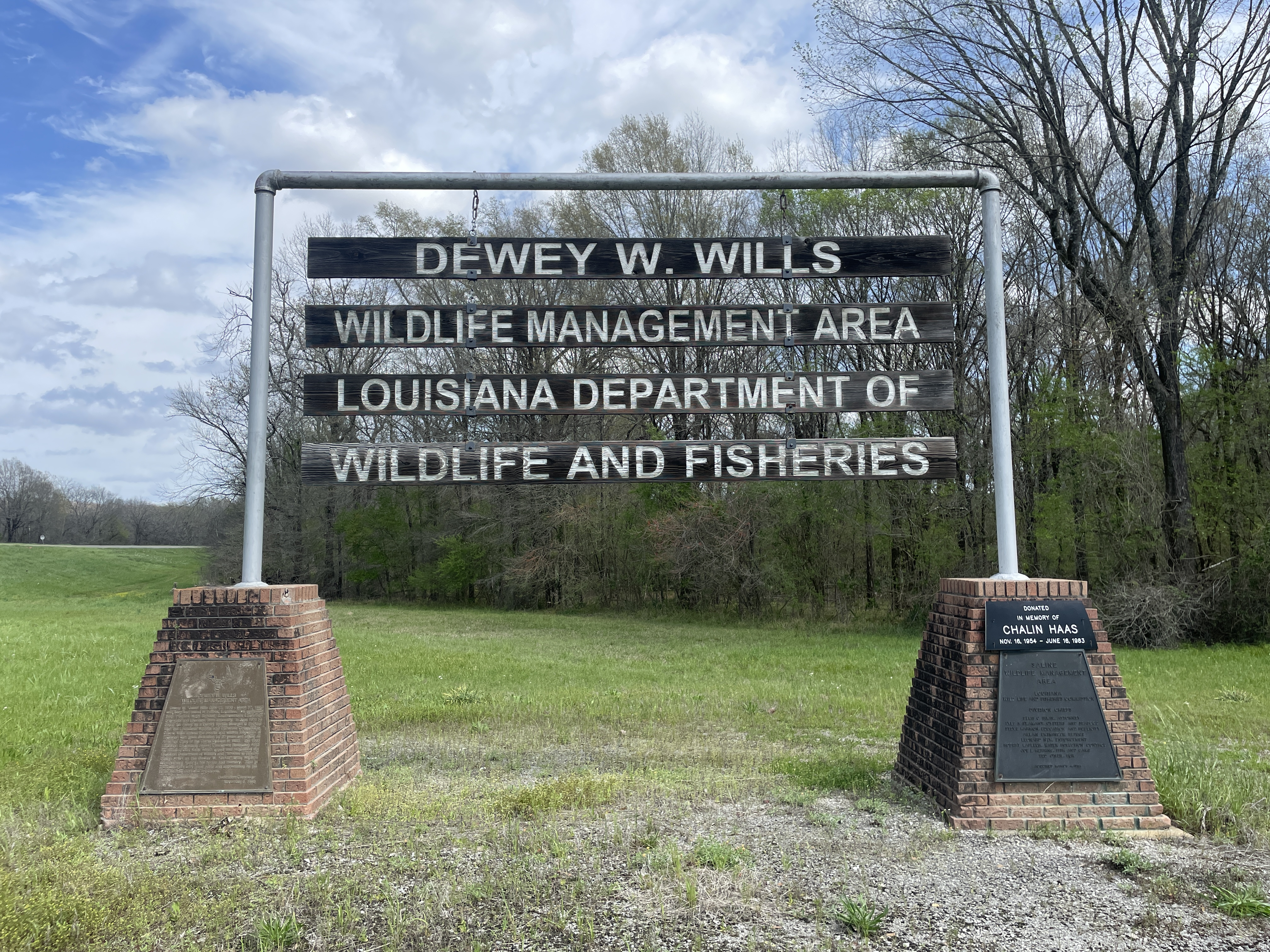

- Location within Louisiana
- Location: LaSalle Parish, Catahoula Parish, and Rapides parish Louisiana
- Coordinates: 31°26′16″N 92°04′10″W
- Area: 63,984 acres (258.93 km^{2})
- Governing body: Louisiana Department of Wildlife and Fisheries, LaSalle Parish School Board, and U.S. Army Corps of Engineers (USCOE)

Dewey W. Wills WMA

Dewey W. Wills Wildlife Management Area, also just called Dewey Wills Wildlife Management Area and formally known as the Saline Wildlife Management area, is a 63,984-acre (25,893 ha) tract of protected area located in LaSalle Parish, Catahoula Parish, and Rapides Parish, in Central Louisiana. The Louisiana Department of Wildlife and Fisheries (LDWF) owns 63,901 acres, the LaSalle Parish School Board owns 1530 acres, and the U.S. Army Corps of Engineers (USCOE) owns 265 acres, managed by the LDWF.

A 2006 class-action lawsuit (Crooks v. State) resulted in a 2017 court decision and reclassification of Catahoula Lake as being a seasonally flooded river and not a lake. The end result is that a change in the definition changes the ownership of the land involved between the low water mark and high water mark around the waterway that would also change the boundaries of the WMA affecting 30,000 acres.

== History ==
Dewey Wills WMA was known as the Saline Wildlife Management Area until changed to the current name and the size was increased from 60,275 acres to the current size in 1978.

== Location ==
The WMA is approximately twenty miles northeast of Alexandria, east of Catahoula Lake, in LaSalle Parish, Catahoula Parish, Rapides parish, and LA 28 runs through the WMA. Catahoula National Wildlife Refuge is to the northeast.

== Description ==
The WMA is separated into three areas owned by the separate entities. The northern boundary is on the east side of Little River between US 84. The WMA runs south along the east side of Catahoula Lake (around Little Lake) and down to the southern boundary with Catahoula Lake and the northern border of Little Saline Bayou at Saline Point. Travelling southeast the WMA borders Little Saline Bayou, joining Big Saline Bayou into Saline Lake. The southern border follows the north shore of the lake, wrapping around the east side. The eastern border is Larto Lake but there is one tract as an island on the north end and another tract located at the south end of the lake.

The Catahoula Lake Diversion Canal runs diagonal through the south central portion of the WMA, from Catahoula Lake southeasterly to the Black River providing flood as well as water control.

== Waterfowl impoundment ==
The WMA has a 400-acre waterfowl impoundment area known as "Greentree reservoir", and a new 3000-acre impoundment was opened in 2015. Boats are allowed using oars only.

== Birds ==
Catahoula Lake was listed as Ramsar site number 523 in 1991. The bald eagle is known to be a non-breeding visitor. Listed as an Important Bird Area (IBA) the area supports anywhere from 40,000 to 300,000 ducks from October to January including 25% of the recorded population of canvasback ducks. On any day there can be from 4,000 to 70,000 shorebirds. Aside from resident wood ducks there are gadwall, green-winged teal, northern pintail, ring-necked duck, mallard, American widgeon, and northern shoveler. Wading birds include great blue heron, little blue heron, great egret, snowy egret, tri-colored heron, cattle egret, least and American bittern, white, glossy and white-faced ibis, wood stork, and roseate spoonbill. Species of conservation concern include the prothonotary warbler, Swainson's warbler, American woodcock, solitary sandpiper, and Kentucky warbler, as well as the little blue heron, and bald eagle. There are 7 species of woodpeckers, 7 species of flycatchers, 5 species of wrens, 21 warbler species, and 15 species in the Emberizidae sparrow complex. Lead shot on the lake bed has been reduced since the 1987 ban but is still present.

== Fauna ==
The main overstory species are overcup oak, bitter pecan, nuttall oak, ash, elm, and willow oak and the understory is swampprivet, reproduction of the overstory, and native grasses and forbs. On higher elevations the understory is composed of deciduous holly, hawthorn, smilax, swamp dogwood, peppervine, rattan vine, dewberry, blackberry, palmetto, and reproduction of the overstory.

== Bears ==
There is a population of Louisiana black bears in the WMA and surrounding areas.

== 2016 floods ==
The torrential rains of March 2016, more than twenty-six inches in many places, caused flooding on the Little River and the WMA resulting in road damages.

== Lake or river? ==
In 2006 Steve and Era Crooks filed a class-action lawsuit against the state of Louisiana known as Crooks vs State regarding ownership of the land around the lake. The decision of the Rapides Parish District Court ruled that the state had unlawfully expropriated the river banks ruling that the land owners be compensated $38 million in damages and $4.5 million in oil and gas royalties.
