= J. Reed Walters =

American politician and attorney

John Reed Walters is an American politician and attorney from Louisiana.

== Background ==
Reed grew up in Olla, Louisiana and attended LaSalle High School. He completed his undergraduate studies at Northeast Louisiana University in Monroe and attended law school at Louisiana State University in Baton Rouge. He was admitted to the bar in 1981.

== Political career ==
In October 1990, he ran as a Democrat for District Attorney of Louisiana's 28th Judicial District, which includes the town of Jena in LaSalle Parish. He was elected to a six-year term against Dan B. Cornett, another Democrat, and took office in early 1991.

Walters won re-election in 1996 and in 2002, against Democratic challenger Lloyd E. Hennigan. He is currently serving his fourth term, which he won uncontested in 2009.

== Jena Six ==
In 2007, Walters was thrust into the spotlight after six black students beat a white student unconscious at Jena High School.

The controversy surrounding prosecution of the Jena Six prompted protesters from across the country to demonstrate in Jena on September 20, 2007.

Walters's actions in prosecuting this case were upheld after a thorough investigation prompted by the allegations of Jena Six supporters. Walters was later lauded for the integrity and the professionalism shown by him and the LaSalle Parish District Attorney's Office during the investigation and amid public scrutiny.

Walters is famously known for writing an op-ed article, where he defended his position, in the New York Times newspaper.

== Electoral history ==
District Attorney, 28th Judicial District, 1990

Threshold > 50%

First Ballot, October 6, 1990

Candidate	Affiliation	Support	Outcome
Reed Walters	Democratic	3,212 (52%)	Elected
Dan B. Cornett	Democratic	3,018 (48%)	Defeated

District Attorney, 28th Judicial District, 1996

Threshold > 50%

First Ballot, September 21, 1996

Candidate	Affiliation	Support	Outcome
Reed Walters	Democratic	2,667 (51%)	Elected
Lloyd Hennigan, Jr.	Democratic	2,545 (49%)	Defeated

District Attorney, 28th Judicial District, 2002

Threshold > 50%

First Ballot, October 5, 2002

Candidate	Affiliation	Support	Outcome
Reed Walters	Democratic	2,817 (56%)	Elected
Lloyd Hennigan, Jr.	Democratic	2,169 (44%)	Defeated
