= Jena High School =

Coordinates: 31.691°N 92.128°W

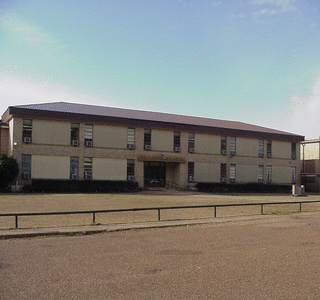

Location
- 243 East High School Drive; Jena, Louisiana 71342; United States

Information
- Type: High School/Secondary Education/
- Established: 1920s
- Principal: Adam Powell
- Teaching staff: 34.36 (FTE)
- Enrollment: 503 (2023-2024)
- Student to teacher ratio: 14.64
- Colors: Gold, Black, White
- Mascot: Giants
- Website: Jena High School

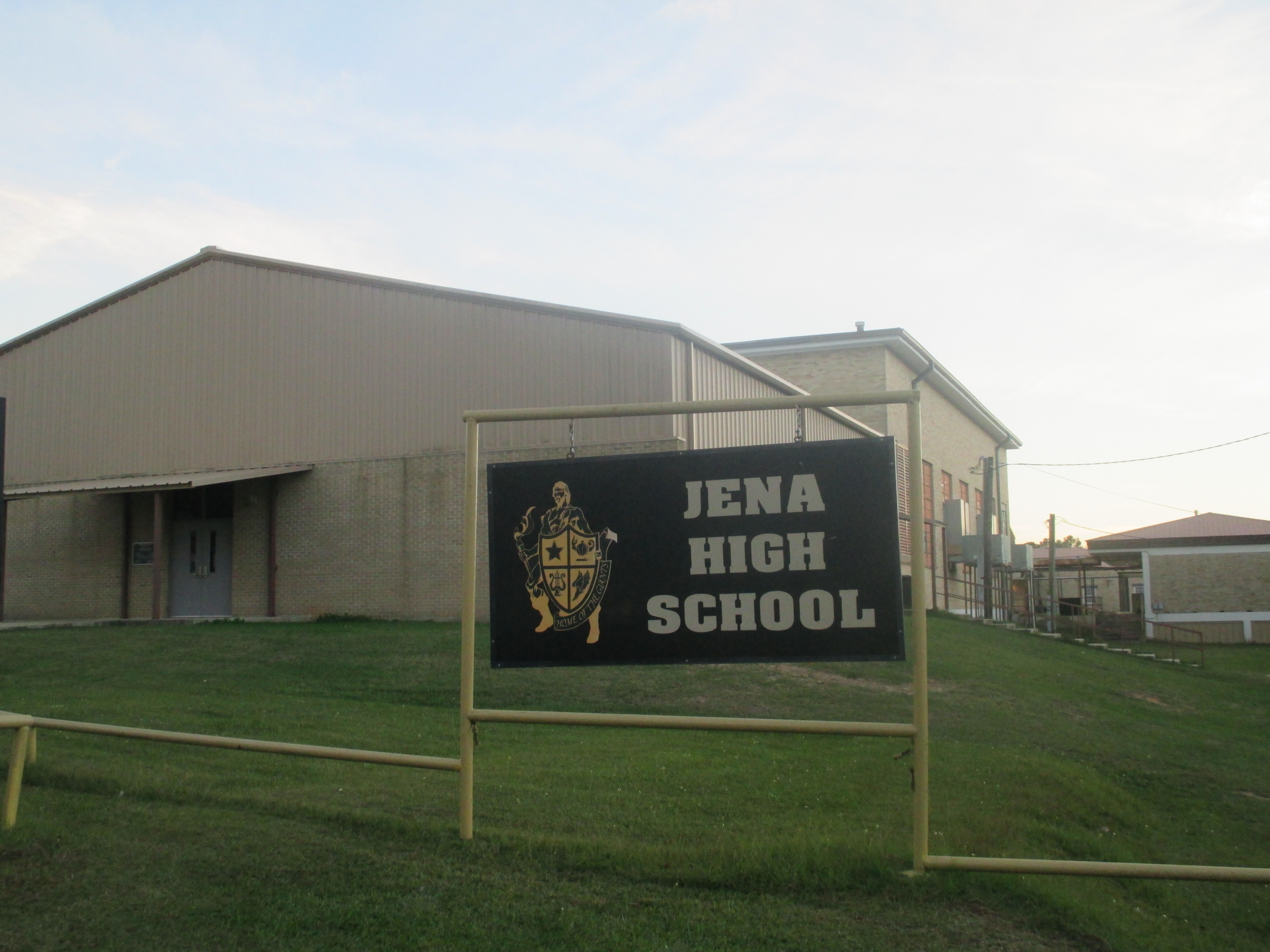
Another view of Jena High School

Jena High School is a secondary school located in Jena, Louisiana, United States. The school, serving grades 9 through 12, is a part of the LaSalle Parish School Board. As of 2006–2007, the school enrollment was 538 students.

The school serves the town of Jena and the unincorporated communities of Belah, Nebo, and Rhinehart.

== History ==
=== 2006 student fight gains national attention ===
The high school's population was about 10% African American in 2006. There were tensions between groups of students, including some groups divided by ethnicity. Beginning September 1, 2006, several incidents in the area occurred which some observers attributed to racial tensions. Law enforcement investigations by parish and federal prosecutors did not support that conclusion for each incident.

On December 4, 2006, a fight broke out on campus and six African-American students assaulted a white student. They were arrested and five were charged with attempted second-degree murder. As prosecution of their case gained national attention because of the severity of the charges in relation to the students' ages, they were later dubbed the Jena 6. The complex case and related issues were controversial and attracted national media attention, development of a legal defense fund, and thousands of protesters at an event in support of one of the students. There were trials, appeals, changes in charges and sentencing.

National attention was drawn to the events by a National Public Radio prime time story on July 30, 2007. John Mellencamp released a song called "Jena" in August 2007, which referred to events at the small high school.

=== Other events ===
The Lady Giants were state champions in 2021.

In 2025, it became the first high school in Louisiana with a Barbecue Club.

In 2025, the Jena Football team played for a state championship for the first time in school history

==== School organization ====
Jena High school is made up of a health care clinic, which has Nursing practitioners who provides health care, immunization and physical sports to the students and staff. There is a clinic for social health workers who provides behavioral health counseling session, they provides therapy to individuals or groups.

== Feeder patterns ==
The following schools feed into Jena High School:

- Fellowship Elementary School (grades PreK–8)
- Jena Junior High School (grades 6–8)
  - Goodpine Middle School (grades 3–5)
    - Jena Elementary School (grades PreK–2)
- Nebo Elementary School (grades PreK–8)

== Athletics ==
Jena High athletics competes in the LHSAA.

== Notable alumni ==
- Jason Hatcher, NFL player
