= Midway, LaSalle Parish, Louisiana =

- Census-designated place
- Location in Louisiana Location in the United States
- Coordinates: 31°40′43″N 92°08′58″W
- Country: United States
- State: Louisiana
- Parish: LaSalle

Area
  - Total: 3.06 sq mi (7.93 km^{2})
  - Land: 3.03 sq mi (7.85 km^{2})
  - Water: 0.031 sq mi (0.08 km^{2})
- Elevation: 203 ft (62 m)

Population (2020)
  - Total: 1,157
  - Density: 381.7/sq mi (147.36/km^{2})
- Time zone: UTC-6 (CST)
  - Summer (DST): UTC-5 (CDT)
- Area code: 318
- FIPS code: 22-50395
- GNIS feature ID: 2403288

Midway is an unincorporated community and census-designated place (CDP) in LaSalle Parish, Louisiana, United States. The population was 1,291 at the 2010 census, down from 1,505 at the 2000 census.

== Geography ==
Midway is located in central LaSalle Parish and is bordered to the north and east by Jena, the parish seat, and to the west by Good Pine. U.S. Route 84 passes through the northern part of Midway, leading east into Jena and northwest 14 miles (23 km) to Tullos. Louisiana Highway 8 passes through the southern part of Midway, also leading east into Jena but running southwest 21 miles (34 km) to Pollock.

According to the United States Census Bureau, the Midway CDP has a total area of 3.1 square miles (7.9 km^{2}), of which 0.03 square miles (0.08 km^{2}), or 1.04%, are water.

== Demographics ==
Historical population
Census	Pop.	Note	%±
1990	1,586		—
2000	1,505		−5.1%
2010	1,586		5.4%
2020	1,157		−27.0%
U.S. Decennial Census; 1950 1960 1970 1980; 1990 2000 2010

Midway first appeared as a census designated place the 1990 U.S. census.

As of the census of 2000, there were 1,505 people, 512 households, and 366 families residing in the CDP. The population density was 429.6 inhabitants per square mile (165.9/km^{2}). There were 577 housing units at an average density of 164.7 per square mile (63.6/km^{2}). The racial makeup of the CDP was 53.02% White, 45.58% African American, 0.66% Native American, 0.13% Asian, 0.07% Pacific Islander, and 0.53% from two or more races. Hispanic or Latino of any race were 0.73% of the population.

There were 512 households, out of which 36.3% had children under the age of 18 living with them, 42.8% were married couples living together, 24.6% had a female householder with no husband present, and 28.5% were non-families. 25.4% of all households were made up of individuals, and 9.6% had someone living alone who was 65 years of age or older. The average household size was 2.72 and the average family size was 3.25.

In the CDP, the population was spread out, with 29.2% under the age of 18, 7.8% from 18 to 24, 24.1% from 25 to 44, 22.1% from 45 to 64, and 16.8% who were 65 years of age or older. The median age was 36 years. For every 100 females, there were 79.8 males. For every 100 females age 18 and over, there were 74.5 males.

The median income for a household in the CDP was $19,479, and the median income for a family was $27,500. Males had a median income of $27,100 versus $15,000 for females. The per capita income for the CDP was $12,819. About 28.4% of families and 30.2% of the population were below the poverty line, including 36.9% of those under age 18 and 12.8% of those age 65 or over.
