= Rhinehart, Louisiana =

- Unincorporated community
- Location within Louisiana Location within the United States
- Coordinates: 31°38′16″N 92°00′24″W
- Country: United States
- State: Louisiana
- Parishes: La Salle, Catahoula
- Elevation: 62 ft (19 m)
- Time zone: UTC-6 (Central (CST))
  - Summer (DST): UTC-5 (CDT)
- ZIP code: 71363
- Area code: 318
- GNIS feature ID: 555794

Rhinehart is an unincorporated community in La Salle and Catahoula parishes, Louisiana, United States. The community is located on Louisiana Highway 8, 8.1 miles (13.0 km) east-southeast of Jena. Rhinehart has a post office with ZIP code 71363.
