= Alan Bean (disambiguation) =

Alan Bean (1932–2018) was an American astronaut.

Alan Bean may also refer to:

- Alan Bean (activist), American activist
- "Alan Bean" (song), a 2001 song by Hefner

== See also ==
- Alan Beaney (1905–1985), British politician
