= Thomas "Bud" Brady =

American politician (1938–2011)

Louisiana State Representative from La Salle, Grant, Rapides, Winn, and Caldwell parishes
- In office 1976–1988
- Preceded by: Kirby D. Mills
- Succeeded by: A. Dale Smith

Personal details
- Born: July 8, 1938 Urania, La Salle Parish; Louisiana
- Died: April 1, 2011 (aged 72) Alexandria, Rapides Parish
- Party: Democratic
- Spouse: Cullyne Roy (m. 1960)
- Children: Roderick Edward Brady (1963-1980); Cecelia Brady Gonzalez; Charlane Rene Brady
- Parent(s): Floyd Lee and Lucille McCarrol Brady
- Education: La Salle High School; Northwestern State University
- Occupation: Businessman; radio announcer

Thomas Floyd "Bud" Brady (July 8, 1938 – April 1, 2011), was an American politician who was a Democratic member of the Louisiana House of Representatives and longtime resident of Olla, Louisiana. He served from 1976 to 1988 from districts which included his native La Salle Parish and at different times neighboring Caldwell, Grant, Rapides, and Winn parishes.

Brady considered himself part of the former Long faction of the Louisiana Democratic Party and claimed to focus his political interest on the needy, elderly, and underprivileged. Brady served during the administrations of Governors Edwin Edwards and David C. Treen.

== Background ==
Brady was born in Urania, Louisiana, to Floyd Lee Brady, a native of Fort Towson in Choctaw County, Oklahoma, and the former Lucille McCarrol. He was a standout athlete and football player at LaSalle High School in Olla, Louisiana. He graduated from LaSalle High School in 1956. He earned a football scholarship to Louisiana State University in Baton Rouge but soon withdrew to attend Northwestern State University in Natchitoches. He developed a health condition involving fevers, and weak muscle coordination. s. In 1962, he received a bachelor's degree in government from NSU. He worked at area radio stations as a disc jockey and announcer in Natchitoches, Farmerville in Union Parish, Winnfield, and Alexandria.

== Political career ==
In 1965, Brady joined the staff in Washington, D.C., of U.S. Representative Speedy O. Long of Louisiana's 8th congressional district, since disbanded. He worked for Long until 1971; after a failed gubernatorial campaign, Long left Congress in 1973 and became the LaSalle Parish district attorney. At the age of thirty-seven, Brady was elected in 1975 to the Louisiana House in the first ever nonpartisan blanket primary system held in Louisiana. From 1984 to 1987, he was the vice chair of the House Administration of Criminal Justice. He was also a member of the House Education Committee.

In 1983, Brady survived a heated challenge from Democratic former Representative W. L. Rambo of Georgetown and sitting House member Richard S. Thompson of Colfax, both in Grant Parish. Brady led the primary field with 6,424 votes (36 percent); Rambo trailed with 5,185 ballots (29.1 percent). Thompson garnered 4,960 votes (27.8 percent), and the remaining 1,276 votes went to Darrel Glen Thaxton of Jena, another Democrat. Brady prevailed by 207 votes in the runoff election, 7,301 (50.7 percent) to 7,094 (49.3 percent) for Rambo. Without his strong support in La Salle Parish, Brady would have been defeated.

In 1986, Brady challenged the incumbent, fellow Democrat Jerry Huckaby of Bienville Parish, for Louisiana's 5th congressional district seat, which Huckaby had held for a decade. Huckaby prevailed with 96,200 votes (68.5 percent) to Brady's 32,284 ballots (23 percent), and 11,966 votes (8.5 percent) for the Monroe businessman Fred W. Huenefeld. Brady won only in La Salle Parish and only by 154 votes.

In 1987, in his bid for a fourth term in reconfigured House District 22 (Grant, La Salle, and Rapides parishes), Brady led in the primary against six other Democrats but was forced into a runoff election against A. Dale Smith, who trailed by about 1,500 votes. Smith prevailed in the second balloting, 8,111 (54.1 percent) to 6,893 (45.9 percent). Brady won only narrowly in his own LaSalle Parish and lost Grant and Rapides parishes.

== Personal life ==
While serving in the legislature, Brady began working in the real estate appraisal business. After his House service, he relocated to Alexandria, where he opened Bud Brady Appraisals. He also had a passion for writing gospel and country music and played the dobro, an instrument given to him by former Governor Jimmie Davis. For a time, he went to Nashville, Tennessee, to pursue a musical career; there, he met Reba McEntire, but none of his songs were placed on an album.

In 1960, Brady married Cullyne Roy Scott (born c. 1940), whom he had met at NSU. A former schoolteacher, she resides in San Diego, California. Their son, Roderick Edward Brady (1963-1980), was killed in an accident while still a teenager. The Bradys had two daughters, Cecelia H. Brady (born 1967), the Miss Louisiana USA in the 1986 pageant and subsequently a resident of San Diego, and Charlane R. Brady (born 1972) of Reykjavík, Iceland and San Francisco, California. He had two grandchildren. Brady was also survived by his brother, Gerald Brady of Lafayette, Louisiana, and a sister, Shirley B. Talley of Houston, Texas.

Brady was a Southern Baptist while living in LaSalle Parish, but after he relocated to Alexandria, he became a Pentecostal. He died in Alexandria at the age of seventy-two. Services were held on April 8, 2011, at Forest Lawn Funeral Home in Ball, with interment at Forest Lawn Memorial Park north of Pineville.

After Brady's death, the Louisiana State Senate approved a concurrent resolution, authored by Joe McPherson of Alexandria and Gerald Long of Natchitoches, to honor him for his public service.

Oddly, another "Thomas Brady", from Terrebonne Parish in South Louisiana, preceded Bud Brady in the Louisiana House. Elward Thomas Brady, Jr., a businessman from Houma, served during the term from 1972 to 1976 but left the house to run unsuccessfully for the Louisiana State Senate at the same time that Budy Brady was first elected.

Louisiana House of Representatives
Preceded by Kirby D. Mills	Louisiana State Representative from La Salle Parish; Thomas Floyd "Bud' Brady; 1976–1988	Succeeded by A. Dale Smith
