= Ronald J. Hays =

United States admiral (1928–2021)

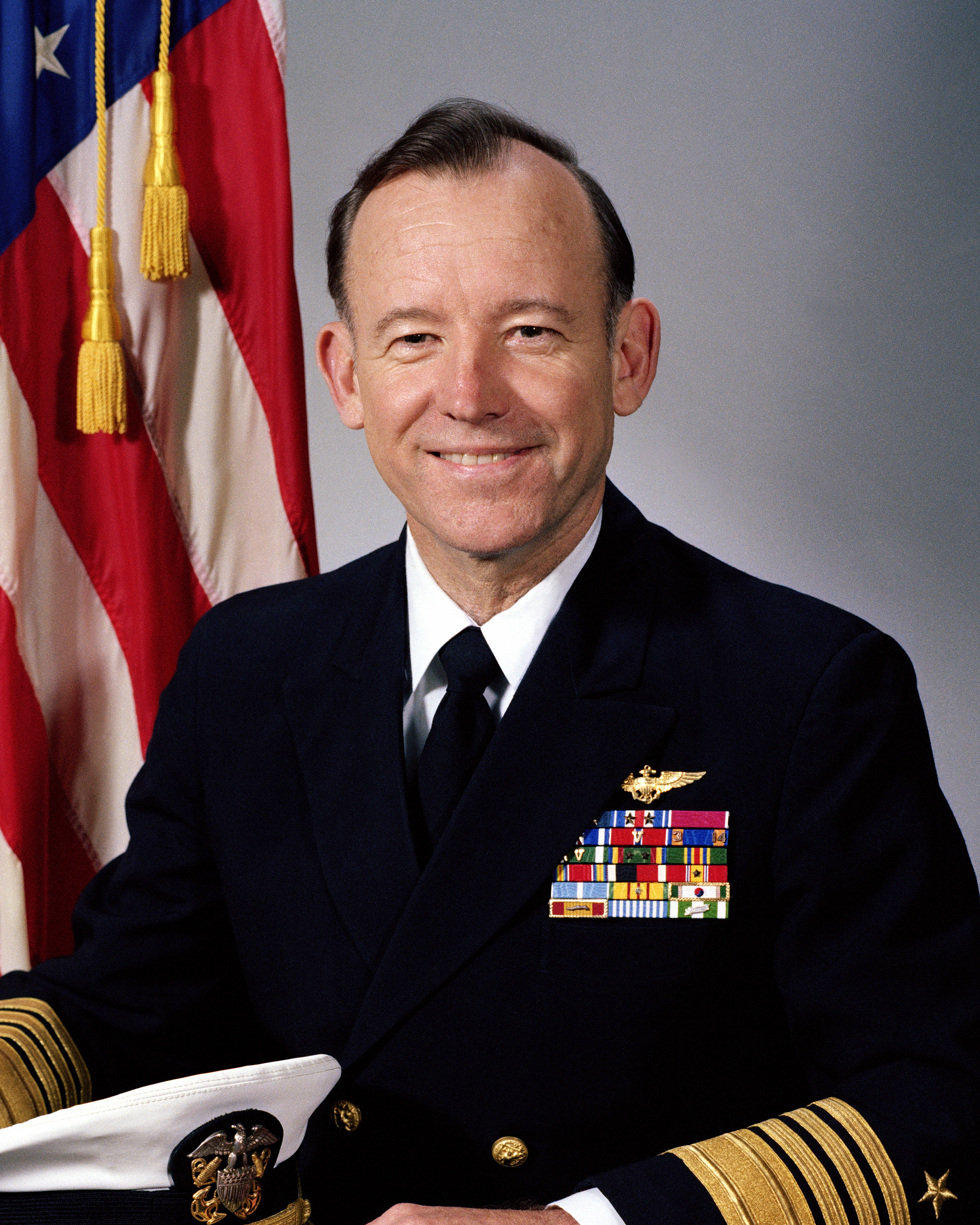
- Admiral Ronald J. Hays
- Born: August 19, 1928; Urania, Louisiana, U.S.
- Died: January 11, 2021 (aged 92); Hawaii, U.S.
- Military career
- Branch: United States Navy
- Service years: 1950–1988
- Rank: Admiral
- Nickname: Happy
- Commands: United States Pacific Command; Vice Chief of Naval Operations; United States Naval Forces Europe; Carrier Group Four; Roosevelt Roads Naval Station; VA-85
- Conflicts: Korean War; Vietnam War
- Awards: Navy Distinguished Service Medal (4); Silver Star (3); Legion of Merit; Distinguished Flying Cross (7); Bronze Star Medal

Ronald Jackson "Happy" Hays (August 19, 1928 – January 11, 2021) was a United States Navy four star admiral who served as Vice Chief of Naval Operations from 1983 to 1985, and as Commander in Chief, United States Pacific Command from 1985 to 1988.

== Early life ==
Hays was born on August 19, 1928, in Urania, Louisiana, near Olla, Louisiana. Happy grew up in Urania and attended Urania High School, now called LaSalle High School. As a teenager, he worked as the butcher's assistant in the Urania Lumber Company Commisarry. The owner, Mr. Q.T. Hardtner, took notice of his integrity and work ethic. Mr. Hardtner mentored Happy and provided the necessary support to help him earn a congressional appointment to the United States Naval Academy in Annapolis, Maryland. Throughout his life, Happy frequently returned to Olla to tend to family land near Urania.

== Naval career ==
Hays graduated from the United States Naval Academy in 1950 and served on a destroyer for one year prior to commencing flight training. After a series of operational aviation assignments, including a tour as an experimental test pilot and two combat tours in Vietnam flying the all-weather attack A-6A Intruder, he was ordered in 1969 to the Pentagon, Washington, D.C., for duty on the staff of the Chief of Naval Operations.

Between 1969 and 1988 Hays' career path was divided between fleet aviation assignments and resource management positions in the Pentagon. During this period significant assignments included:

- Commanding Officer, Roosevelt Roads Naval Station, Puerto Rico
- Director, Navy Program Planning
- Commander, Carrier Group Four
- Director, Office of Program Appraisal
- Deputy Commander in Chief, Atlantic Forces
- Commander in Chief, United States Naval Forces Europe
- Vice Chief of Naval Operations
- Commander in Chief, United States Pacific Command

As Commander in Chief Pacific Forces, Hays commanded all United States military forces in the Pacific theater. He retired from military service in October 1988 and entered the commercial world as a director on several boards, including civic and non-profit organizations. He also served as a consultant for the Parsons Corporation, a global engineering firm.

Hays is a graduate of the Naval War College, Newport, Rhode Island; Test Pilot School, Patuxent River, Maryland; Federal Executive Institute, University of Virginia; and Flight Safety School, University of California.

Hays was awarded a Doctorate of Humanities by Northwestern State University, Natchitoches, Louisiana. In 2005, he was honored as a Distinguished Graduate of the United States Naval Academy. He was recognized as a Distinguished Eagle Scout.

Recognition for Hays' military service includes the Navy Distinguished Service Medal (4 awards), Silver Star (3 awards), Distinguished Flying Cross (7 awards), Bronze Star Medal with Valor device; Air Medal with Strike/Flight numerals, and the Navy Commendation Medal with Valor device. He also received personal awards from the heads of government of Korea, Japan, Thailand, and the Philippines and the Gray Eagle Award.

Hays was Chairman of the Board of the development of the Pacific Aviation Museum in historic Pearl Harbor.

== Military awards ==

Naval Aviator Badge
Navy Distinguished Service Medal w/ 3 award stars	Silver Star w/ 2 award stars	Legion of Merit
Distinguished Flying Cross w/ 6 award stars	Bronze Star Medal w/Valor Device	Air Medal 3 personal and 14 Strike/Flight
Navy and Marine Corps Commendation Medal w/Valor Device and 1 award star	Navy Unit Commendation w/ 2 service stars	Navy Meritorious Unit Commendation
World War II Victory Medal	Navy Occupation Medal	National Defense Service Medal w/ 1 service star
Korea Service Medal	Vietnam Service Medal w/ 5 campaign stars	Korea Presidential Unit Citation
Vietnam Gallantry Cross Unit Citation	United Nations Korea Medal	Vietnam Campaign Medal

Military offices
Preceded by William N. Small	Vice Chief of Naval Operations; 1983–1985	Succeeded by James B. Busey IV
