= Standard, LaSalle Parish, Louisiana =

- Unincorporated community
- Location within Louisiana Location within the United States
- Coordinates: 31°55′04″N 92°13′12″W
- Country: United States
- State: Louisiana
- Parish: La Salle
- Elevation: 171 ft (52 m)
- Time zone: UTC-6 (Central (CST))
  - Summer (DST): UTC-5 (CDT)
- Area code: 318
- GNIS feature ID: 539619

Standard is an unincorporated community in LaSalle Parish, Louisiana, United States. Standard is considered part of the Greater Olla, Louisiana Region.

== Notable person ==
- Former Louisiana State Representative Evelyn Blackmon from West Monroe, was born in Standard in 1924.
