= Alan Bean (activist) =

American activist

Alan Bean is a white former minister working to uncover injustice and organize black opposition, in the racial controversies surrounding the Tulia 47 drug sting in Tulia, Texas and the Jena Six controversy in Jena, Louisiana. In 1999, Dr. Alan Bean founded the organization, Friends of Justice, an alliance of community members to advocate for criminal justice reform.
