= 1952 United States presidential election in Louisiana =

- November 4, 1952

All 10 Louisiana votes to the Electoral College

Nominee	Adlai Stevenson	Dwight D. Eisenhower
Party	Democratic	Republican
Home state	Illinois	New York
Running mate	John Sparkman	Richard Nixon
Electoral vote	10	0
Popular vote	345,027	306,925
Percentage	52.92%	47.08%
Parish results
Stevenson
50–60%
60–70%
70–80%
Eisenhower
50–60%
60–70%
90–100%
President before election
Harry S. Truman
Democratic
Elected President
Dwight D. Eisenhower
Republican

The 1952 United States presidential election in Louisiana took place on November 4, 1952, as part of the 1952 United States presidential election. State voters chose ten representatives, or electors, to the Electoral College, who voted for president and vice president.

Louisiana was won by Adlai Stevenson (D–Illinois), running with Senator John Sparkman, with 52.92% of the popular vote, against Dwight D. Eisenhower (R–New York), running with Senator Richard Nixon, with 47.08% of the popular vote. Eisenhowerʼs performance was nonetheless the best by a Republican in the state since Reconstruction.

As of the 2024 presidential election, this is the last election in which Ouachita Parish, Union Parish, and LaSalle Parish voted for a Democratic presidential candidate. This is the most recent election in which the Democratic nominee would carry the state without winning the presidency.

== Results ==
1952 United States presidential election in Louisiana
Party	Candidate	Votes	%
Democratic	Adlai Stevenson	345,027	52.92%
Republican	Dwight D. Eisenhower	306,925	47.08%
Total votes		651,952	100%

=== Results by parish ===
Parish	Adlai Stevenson Democratic		Dwight D. Eisenhower Republican		Margin		Total votes cast
Parish	#	%	#	%	#	%	Total votes cast
Acadia	5,863	58.45%	4,167	41.55%	1,696	16.90%	10,030
Allen	3,754	71.98%	1,461	28.02%	2,293	43.96%	5,215
Ascension	3,593	66.78%	1,787	33.22%	1,806	33.56%	5,380
Assumption	1,647	57.65%	1,210	42.35%	437	15.30%	2,857
Avoyelles	4,405	63.99%	2,479	36.01%	1,926	27.98%	6,884
Beauregard	996	55.80%	789	44.20%	207	11.60%	1,785
Bienville	1,754	46.90%	1,986	53.10%	-232	-6.20%	3,740
Bossier	2,683	42.19%	3,677	57.81%	-994	-15.62%	6,360
Caddo	14,554	34.32%	27,850	65.68%	-13,296	-31.36%	42,404
Calcasieu	15,814	58.75%	11,102	41.25%	4,712	17.50%	26,916
Caldwell	1,162	54.73%	961	45.27%	201	9.46%	2,123
Cameron	1,005	59.50%	684	40.50%	321	19.00%	1,689
Catahoula	1,336	60.18%	884	39.82%	452	20.36%	2,220
Claiborne	1,530	35.37%	2,796	64.63%	-1,266	-29.26%	4,326
Concordia	1,252	53.01%	1,110	46.99%	142	6.02%	2,362
DeSoto	1,678	42.15%	2,303	57.85%	-625	-15.70%	3,981
East Baton Rouge	23,105	53.99%	19,693	46.01%	3,412	7.98%	42,798
East Carroll	918	54.81%	757	45.19%	161	9.62%	1,675
East Feliciana	1,019	53.77%	876	46.23%	143	7.54%	1,895
Evangeline	3,398	58.16%	2,445	41.84%	953	16.32%	5,843
Franklin	2,833	63.71%	1,614	36.29%	1,219	27.42%	4,447
Grant	2,646	64.71%	1,443	35.29%	1,203	29.42%	4,089
Iberia	4,040	41.61%	5,669	58.39%	-1,629	-16.78%	9,709
Iberville	3,497	67.16%	1,710	32.84%	1,787	34.32%	5,207
Jackson	2,817	63.57%	1,614	36.43%	1,203	27.14%	4,431
Jefferson	19,365	53.12%	17,090	46.88%	2,275	6.24%	36,455
Jefferson Davis	3,584	50.97%	3,447	49.03%	137	1.94%	7,031
Lafayette	6,443	49.90%	6,470	50.10%	-27	-0.20%	12,913
Lafourche	5,396	59.07%	3,739	40.93%	1,657	18.14%	9,135
LaSalle	2,001	54.18%	1,692	45.82%	309	8.36%	3,693
Lincoln	2,009	39.52%	3,074	60.48%	-1,065	-20.96%	5,083
Livingston	3,578	71.36%	1,436	28.64%	2,142	42.72%	5,014
Madison	695	35.68%	1,253	64.32%	-558	-28.64%	1,948
Morehouse	3,006	53.94%	2,567	46.06%	439	7.88%	5,573
Natchitoches	3,876	55.53%	3,104	44.47%	772	11.06%	6,980
Orleans	89,999	51.26%	85,572	48.74%	4,427	2.52%	175,571
Ouachita	9,775	52.51%	8,842	47.49%	933	5.02%	18,617
Plaquemines	255	7.03%	3,370	92.97%	-3,115	-85.94%	3,625
Pointe Coupee	1,385	54.12%	1,174	45.88%	211	8.24%	2,559
Rapides	13,576	58.20%	9,749	41.80%	3,827	16.40%	23,325
Red River	1,822	70.18%	774	29.82%	1,048	40.36%	2,596
Richland	2,499	60.30%	1,645	39.70%	854	20.60%	4,144
Sabine	3,282	61.68%	2,039	38.32%	1,243	23.36%	5,321
St. Bernard	2,117	48.29%	2,267	51.71%	-150	-3.42%	4,384
St. Charles	2,679	71.16%	1,086	28.84%	1,593	42.32%	3,765
St. Helena	895	60.43%	586	39.57%	309	20.86%	1,481
St. James	2,165	61.54%	1,353	38.46%	812	23.08%	3,518
St. John the Baptist	2,132	76.53%	654	23.47%	1,478	53.06%	2,786
St. Landry	4,761	47.31%	5,303	52.69%	-542	-5.38%	10,064
St. Martin	2,012	56.42%	1,554	43.58%	458	12.84%	3,566
St. Mary	4,249	49.03%	4,417	50.97%	-168	-1.94%	8,666
St. Tammany	4,465	55.38%	3,598	44.62%	867	10.76%	8,063
Tangipahoa	5,850	53.10%	5,166	46.90%	684	6.20%	11,016
Tensas	688	49.46%	703	50.54%	-15	-1.08%	1,391
Terrebonne	4,252	52.49%	3,848	47.51%	404	4.98%	8,100
Union	2,055	52.04%	1,894	47.96%	161	4.08%	3,949
Vermilion	5,261	57.63%	3,868	42.37%	1,393	15.26%	9,129
Vernon	3,832	64.27%	2,130	35.73%	1,702	28.54%	5,962
Washington	7,420	75.31%	2,432	24.69%	4,988	50.62%	9,852
Webster	4,544	56.90%	3,442	43.10%	1,102	13.80%	7,986
West Baton Rouge	1,280	64.52%	704	35.48%	576	29.04%	1,984
West Carroll	2,040	59.34%	1,398	40.66%	642	18.68%	3,438
West Feliciana	279	35.68%	503	64.32%	-224	-28.64%	782
Winn	2,206	53.53%	1,915	46.47%	291	7.06%	4,121
Totals	345,027	52.92%	306,925	47.08%	38,102	5.84%	651,952

==== Parishes that flipped from Dixiecrat to Republican ====
- Bienville
- Bossier
- Caddo
- Claiborne
- DeSoto
- Lafayette
- Lincoln
- Madison
- Plaquemines
- Saint Bernard
- St. Mary
- St. Landry
- Tensas
- West Feliciana

==== Parishes that flipped from Dixiecrat to Democratic ====
- Acadia
- Ascension
- Assumption
- Avoyelles
- Caldwell
- Catahoula
- Concordia
- East Carroll
- East Feliciana
- Evangeline
- Franklin
- Grant
- Jackson
- Jefferson
- LaSalle
- Lafourche
- Morehouse
- Natchitoches
- Orleans
- Ouachita
- Pointe Coupee
- Red River
- Rapides
- Richland
- Sabine
- St. Charles
- St. Helena
- St. Martin
- Tangipahoa
- St. Martin
- Union
- Vermilion
- Terrebonne
- Vernon
- Washington
- Webster
- Winn
- West Carroll

== See also ==
- United States presidential elections in Louisiana
