= Bomani Armah =

American vocalist

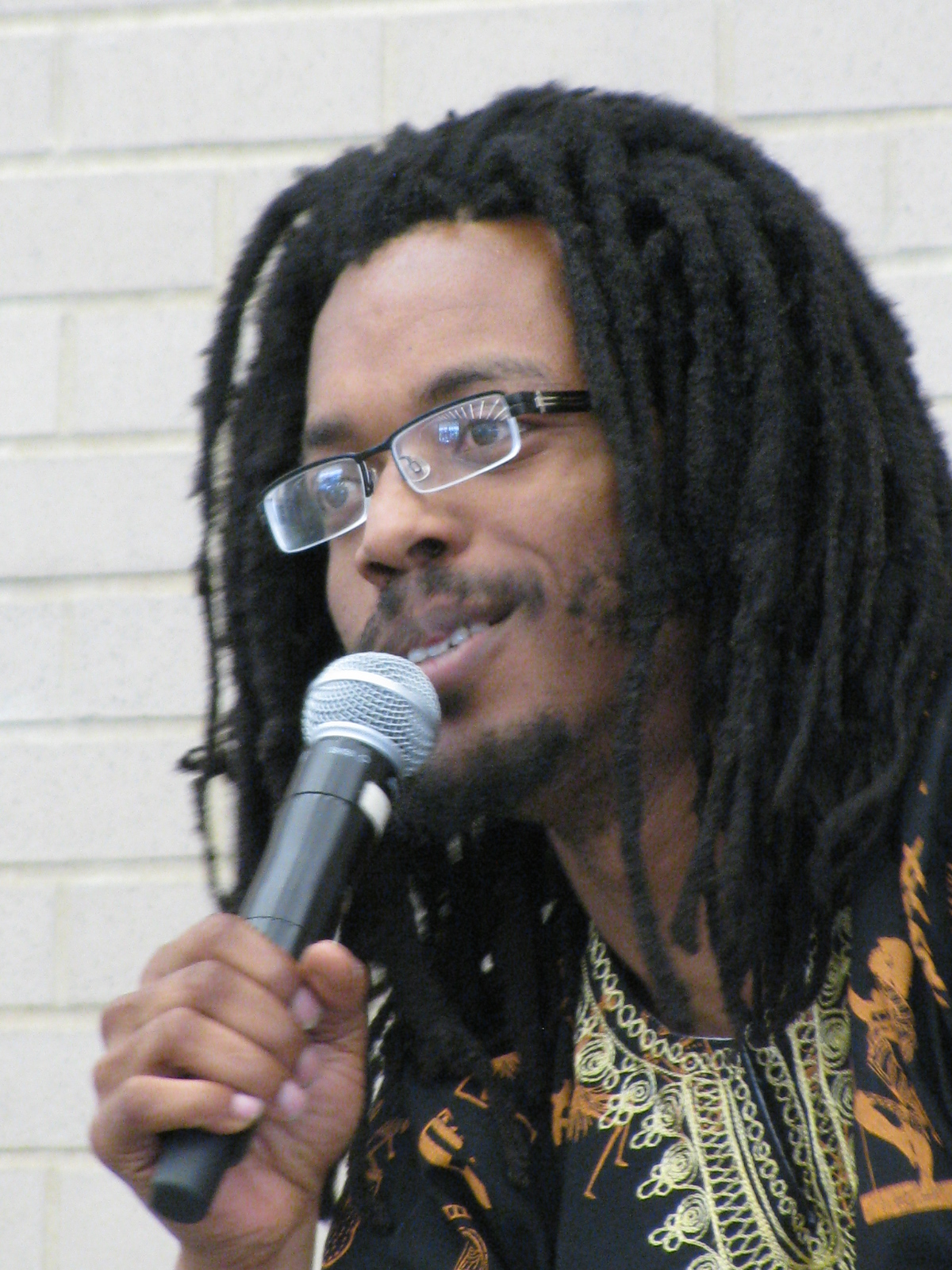
- Armah in 2015
- Born: Darel Hancock
- Education: University of Maryland, College Park
- Writing career
- Genres: Hip hop, crunk

Bomani Armah (previously known as Darel Hancock), also known as D'mite, or Not a Rapper, is an American poet, rapper and motivational speaker, who is known for the 2007 single "Read a Book."

== Biography ==
Armah grew up in Mitchellville, Maryland. He dropped out of the University of Maryland, College Park to become a musician. He is divorced and is the father of twins. He is also a member of Iota Phi Theta fraternity.

In 2005, Bomani was introduced to the world with the debut of the Mello-D and the Rados music video "Cool Witchu" on BET. By October 2006, The Washington Post regarded him as "one of the more entertaining voices in a local spoken word scene that's overflowing with talent." They also noted that he was "grabb[ing] hearts and minds" with "Read a Book", a spoof of crunk songs that was "scary because it's a bit difficult to tell that it's satire".

In January 2007, Armah took part in Martin Luther King Day observances at the Washington National Cathedral, with Sister Helen Prejean and the Urban Nation H.I.P.-H.O.P. Choir.

Armah became famous with the MySpace-released 2007 single "Read A Book." The song admonishes listeners to, among other things, "read a muh'fuckin book", "raise yo kids", "wear deodorant", "buy some land", and brush their "God damned teeth" in a satire of crunk-style songs which advocate for a more "gangsta" lifestyle, set to a loop of an excerpt from Beethoven's Symphony No.5. A clean version also exists, where the profanity is edited out. Success of the single grew when it was used as the topic of a short animated film which aired on Black Entertainment Television's The 5ive. Animated by Six Point Harness Studios, the video features stylized cartoon stereotypes who are directed (often by force) to carry out the advice presented in the lyrics of "Read a Book" by a crunk rapper. In June 2007 the song was included on Dan Greenpeace and DJ Yoda's Unthugged Vol. 2 with an introduction from Armah introducing himself as D'Mite.

In the fall of 2007, Armah released a song about the Jena Six case in Louisiana. He also performed at the CMJ Music Marathon, where a Village Voice blogger panned him as a "technically strong rapper with zero stage presence and only slightly more personality."

Armah returned to the National Cathedral in January 2008, to lead its Martin Luther King Day event.

In March 2008, The Washington Post published his commentary calling on Barack Obama to show his "white side."
