= LaSalle Parish School Board =

School district in Louisiana, US

Coordinates: 31.6858°N 92.1331°W

LaSalle Parish School Board is a school district headquartered in Jena, Louisiana, United States, serving LaSalle Parish. As of 2023 the Superintendent is Jonathan Garrett.

The LaSalle Parish School District is divided into 10 wards.

== School Board Members ==
- Ward 1 - Jessica Lasiter
- Ward 2 - Jonny Fryar
- Ward 3 - Fred Book
- Ward 4 - Marcia Cooksey
- Ward 5 - D'Juana McCartney
- Ward 6 - Buddy Bethard (Vice President of the Board)
- Ward 7 - Deborah Mayo (President of the Board)
- Ward 8 - Dolan Pendarvis
- Ward 9 - Seth Corley
- Ward 10 - Melvin Worthington

== Schools ==
=== High schools ===
- Jena High School (Jena) (Giants)
- LaSalle High School (Olla) (Tigers)

=== K-8 schools ===
- Fellowship Elementary School (Unincorporated area)
- Nebo Elementary School (Unincorporated area)

=== 6-8 schools ===
- LaSalle Junior High School (Urania)

=== 7-8 schools ===
- Jena Junior High School (Jena)

=== 4-6 schools ===
- Goodpine Middle School (Unincorporated area)

=== PK-5 schools ===
- Olla-Standard Elementary School (Olla)

=== PreK-3 schools ===
- Jena Elementary School (Jena)
