= Urania, Louisiana =

- Town
- Town of Urania
- Location of Urania in LaSalle Parish, Louisiana.

- Location of Louisiana in the United States
- Coordinates: 31°52′12″N 92°17′33″W
- Country: United States
- State: Louisiana
- Parish: La Salle

Area
  - Total: 1.38 sq mi (3.58 km^{2})
  - Land: 1.37 sq mi (3.55 km^{2})
  - Water: 0.012 sq mi (0.03 km^{2})
- Elevation: 92 ft (28 m)

Population (2020)
  - Total: 698
  - Density: 509.1/sq mi (196.58/km^{2})
- Time zone: UTC-6 (CST)
  - Summer (DST): UTC-5 (CDT)
- Area code: 318
- FIPS code: 22-77490
- GNIS feature ID: 2406781
- Website: www.facebook.com/pages/Town-of-Urania-Louisiana/494502287258175

Urania is a town in La Salle Parish, Louisiana United States. As of the 2020 census, Urania had a population of 698.

The late state Representative Thomas "Bud" Brady was born in Urania in 1938.

== Geography ==
According to the United States Census Bureau, the town has a total area of 1.2 square miles (3.1 km^{2}), of which 1.2 square miles (3.1 km^{2}) is land and 0.80% is water.

== Demographics ==
Historical population
Census	Pop.	Note	%±
1950	1,004		—
1960	1,063		5.9%
1970	874		−17.8%
1980	849		−2.9%
1990	782		−7.9%
2000	700		−10.5%
2010	1,313		87.6%
2020	698		−46.8%
2025 (est.)	1,155	▲	65.5%
U.S. Decennial Census

As of the census of 2000, there were 700 people, 274 households, and 201 families residing in the town. The population density was 563.5 inhabitants per square mile (217.6/km^{2}). There were 311 housing units at an average density of 250.4 per square mile (96.7/km^{2}). The racial makeup of the town was 96.00% White, 0.71% African American, 0.43% Native American, 0.57% from other races, and 2.29% from two or more races. Hispanic or Latino of any race were 2.14% of the population.

There were 274 households, out of which 33.2% had children under the age of 18 living with them, 63.9% were married couples living together, 7.7% had a female householder with no husband present, and 26.3% were non-families. 23.7% of all households were made up of individuals, and 13.5% had someone living alone who was 65 years of age or older. The average household size was 2.54 and the average family size was 3.03.

In the town, the population was spread out, with 26.4% under the age of 18, 9.9% from 18 to 24, 27.7% from 25 to 44, 21.6% from 45 to 64, and 14.4% who were 65 years of age or older. The median age was 36 years. For every 100 females, there were 91.3 males. For every 100 females age 18 and over, there were 88.6 males.

The median income for a household in the town was $25,625, and the median income for a family was $29,167. Males had a median income of $22,404 versus $18,125 for females. The per capita income for the town was $10,517. About 18.7% of families and 24.0% of the population were below the poverty line, including 32.6% of those under age 18 and 23.7% of those age 65 or over.

== Education ==
The following schools operated by the La Salle Parish School Board serve the city:

- Olla-Standard Elementary School (Olla)
- La Salle Junior High School (Urania)
- La Salle High School (Olla)
