= Olla, Louisiana =

- Town
- Location of Olla in LaSalle Parish, Louisiana.

- Location of Louisiana in the United States
- Coordinates: 31°53′25″N 92°14′20″W
- Country: United States
- State: Louisiana
- Parish: LaSalle

Area
  - Total: 3.93 sq mi (10.19 km^{2})
  - Land: 3.93 sq mi (10.19 km^{2})
  - Water: 0 sq mi (0.00 km^{2})
- Elevation: 141 ft (43 m)

Population (2020)
  - Total: 1,295
  - Density: 329.2/sq mi (127.11/km^{2})
- Time zone: UTC-6 (CST)
  - Summer (DST): UTC-5 (CDT)
- ZIP code: 71465
- Area code: 318
- FIPS code: 22-57905
- GNIS feature ID: 2407046
- Website: www.townofolla.com

Olla is an incorporated town in northwest La Salle Parish, Louisiana, United States, located in the heart of the Louisiana Central Hill Country.

As of the 2020 census, Olla had a population of 1,295.

== Etymology ==
In 1891, the Houston, Central Arkansas, and Northern Railroad was constructed in what was then northwest Catahoula Parish miles away from the town of Castor Sulfur Springs. Castor Sulfur Springs community leaders decided that businesses and the post office must be moved to a new site along the new trainline and a railroad station for passenger and commercial services be constructed to ensure the survival of the community.

Dr. Frank Mills and Mr. James T. Adams selected 40 acres (16 ha) along the new trainline, laid out streets for a town-site and constructed a train station. During this time many names were considered for the new town. After much debate, local leaders agreed the new town shall be named in honor of Miss Olla Mills. Ms. Olla Mills was the daughter of Dr. Frank M. Mills and sister of Judge William H. Mills, who were prominent residents of Castor Sulfur Springs. Miss Olla Mills married Baptist Pastor C.C. Young] and was laid to rest in the Olla Cemetery in 1901. A portrait of Ms. Olla Mills is available to view inside the Olla Town Hall.

== History ==
The Town of Olla, incorporated in 1899 is the oldest incorporated town in LaSalle Parish and the Olla State Bank Building is the oldest permanent brick structure in LaSalle Parish. Settled prior to the American Civil War by the descendants of Scotch-Irish or Ulster Scot immigrants, the area around the modern Town of Olla was formerly known as Castor Sulfur Springs with a steamboat port located on nearby Bayou Castor. Castor Sulphur Springs was abandoned and moved to the present site of the town of Olla in 1891 when the Houston, Central Arkansas, and Northern Railroad was constructed.

In 1890, the Olla Military Institute, a private military school was established. The school flourished for several years until 1899, when a fire destroyed the campus. At this time, a public school, Olla High School, was constructed to serve the towns of Olla and Standard. In 1950, Olla, Urania, and Tullos High Schools closed and consolidated as LaSalle High School. The Olla Elementary School is located on the former site of the Olla Military Institute and Olla High School campus.

The Town of Olla was officially incorporated on August 1, 1899, with Dr. William V. Taylor III as its first mayor. In 1906, the Zeagler Family established and erected the Olla State Bank as the cornerstone of the downtown. Built in Romanesque Revival style, the bank's structure is said to be influenced by Louisiana native and architect Henry Hobson Richardson. The Olla State Bank served Olla and the surrounding region throughout the Great Depression until its merger with Southern Heritage Bank in 1980s. The Ernest Gray Gang as well as The Jimmy Yarrell Gang held up the bank in the 1930s.

Olla is also the only documented armed train holdup in Louisiana history. In August 1900, unknown bandits built a fire on the tracks north of Olla and forced the train to stop. The group then boarded and ordered the conductor to disconnect the mail and express cars from the train. The robbers got away with less than $50. The expected money was not on board the train.

in 1912, near the site of the former Olla Military Institute, B.E. Zeagler of Olla and L.C. Nunn of Columbia, Louisiana organized and constructed the North Central Louisiana Fair, agriculture fair barns, and an equine racetrack stadium. Since inception, the Olla Fair Grounds have served the parishes of La Salle, Winn, Grant, and Caldwell. The Historic Olla Fair Grounds hosts an annual event every fall and it is one of the oldest continuously running fairs or carnivals in the United States.

In 1910, the state of Louisiana split Catahoula Parish in half. The western half where the Town of Olla is situated became La Salle Parish, named for French explorer René-Robert Cavelier, Sieur de La Salle. An immediate struggle developed between the towns of Olla and Jena over the location of the parish courthouse and seat. Jena was subsequently chosen as the La Salle parish seat because of its central location. Even without the prestige of being the parish seat, the early 20th century brought many positive changes and growth to the Town of Olla. Olla's rapidly economy grew with the success of large sawmills in the area – Urania Lumber Company Tremont Lumber Company, and Louisiana Central Lumber Company. During this time electricity and natural gas were introduced to the citizens of Olla along with a silent Theater opened by Mr. Sam Shamblin.

Known for its excellent ground water, Olla was the site of the Olla Bottling Works. During the 1920s and 1930s, the Olla Bottling Works made and distributed numerous flavored carbonated beverages including NuGrape Soda. The Olla Bottling Works was purchased by a firm in Monroe and eventually closed and merged with the Coca-Cola Bottling Company.

The Southern Baptist encampment and the Civilian Conservation Corps Camp activities also left their mark on Olla and region. Each year Southern Baptist campers gathered for two weeks of religious instruction, preaching, and recreation. The Civilian Conservation Corps (CCC) Camp occupied the same facilities the remainder of the year. The region is still crossed with public and private roads built by the CCC. The Town of Olla is also the site of Camp Olla, an annual Pentecostal summer camp, retreat, and hurricane evacuation shelter.

In 1938, the Olla Field was discovered and brought the oil and gas industry to Central Louisiana with the help of H. L. Hunt. This exploration led to the discovery of a significant natural gas and oil producing reservoir. The Olla Oil field was the first discovery of oil sands below the Wilcox Group Eocene strata. Previous oil discoveries made in Urania and Tullos were in sands above this formation. The Olla Oil Field along with the East Texas Oil Field production helped provide critical fuel to the United States military during World War II.

On November 23, 2004, a tornado that reached F3 strength tore through parts of the town, destroying or damaging a large portion of the town, including LaSalle High School. Classes were held in an abandoned sportswear factory, known as Holloway Sportswear, until a new high school was constructed.

LaSalle High School Louisiana High School State Championships

- 2025 Louisiana DIV Softball State Championship, LaSalle 11-2 Logansport
- 2021 Louisiana 1A Softball State Championship, LaSalle 12-4 Oak Grove
- 2017 Louisiana 1A Softball State Championship, LaSalle 6-2 Oak Grove
- 2002 Louisiana 1A Softball State Championship, LaSalle 4-2 Mangham
- 2017 Louisiana 1A Baseball State Championship, LaSalle 8-3 Grand Lake
- 1951 Louisiana B/C Baseball State Championship, LaSalle 6-5 Delhi

In 2005, the town provided shelter and refuge to many evacuees from Hurricanes Katrina and Rita.

== Geography ==
Olla is located within the Louisiana Central Hill Country, the upland hilled areas between the Red and Ouachita River valleys.

According to the United States Census Bureau, the town has a total area of 5.4 square miles (12.9 km^{2}), all land. It is situated exactly halfway (47 miles) (76 km), between Monroe to the north and Alexandria to the south. Also to the south, the towns of Urania and Tullos lie four and seven miles, respectively. The town of Jena is 16 miles (26 km) to the southeast.

The town of Olla has excellent infrastructure for growth. Served by dual tracks of the Union Pacific Railroad, U.S. Route 165, U.S. Route 84, and a number of state roads serve as transportation corridors. The Olla Airport, FAA:L47, is owned by the LaSalle Parish Police Jury.

== Demographics ==
Historical population
Census	Pop.	Note	%±
1910	260		—
1920	266		2.3%
1930	740		178.2%
1940	691		−6.6%
1950	1,115		61.4%
1960	1,246		11.7%
1970	1,387		11.3%
1980	1,603		15.6%
1990	1,410		−12.0%
2000	1,417		0.5%
2010	1,385		−2.3%
2020	1,295		−6.5%
2025 (est.)	1,325	▲	2.3%
U.S. Decennial Census

As of the census of 2010, there were 1,617 people, 587 households, and 407 families residing in the town. The population density was 413.9 inhabitants per square mile (159.8/km^{2}). There were 681 housing units at an average density of 198.9 per square mile (76.8/km^{2}). The racial makeup of the town was 95.06% White, 2.46% African American, 1.35% Native American, 0.42% Asian, 0.21% from other races, and 0.49% from two or more races. Hispanic or Latino of any race were 1.20% of the population.

There were 587 households, of which 32.2% had children under the age of 18 living with them, 55.5% were married couples living together, 11.4% had a female householder with no husband present, and 30.5% were non-families. 27.9% of all households were made up of individuals, and 15.2% had someone living alone who was 65 years of age or older. The average household size was 2.41 and the average family size was 2.95.

In the town, the population was spread out, with 26.1% under the age of 18, 8.5% from 18 to 24, 28.9% from 25 to 44, 21.3% from 45 to 64, and 15.2% who were 65 years of age or older. The median age was 36 years. For every 100 females, there were 87.9 males. For every 100 females age 18 and over, there were 85.3 males.

The incorporated Towns of Olla, Urania, Tullos, and Georgetown, unincorporated Northern LaSalle, Southern Caldwell, Northern Grant, and Eastern Winn Parishes are considered the Olla Market Area or Olla Region.

== Education ==
The following schools operated by the La Salle Parish School Board serve the city:

- Olla-Standard Elementary School (Olla)
- La Salle Junior High School (Urania, Louisiana)
- La Salle High School (Olla)

== Tourist attractions ==
Olla has a federally recognized downtown Historic District and a Louisiana historic marker. The Olla Historic District hosts the Olla Homecoming Parade, Celebration, and Festival that coincides with LaSalle High School Homecoming each Autumn.

The Olla Historic District is the home of the Centennial Cultural Center Museum, annual nighttime Christmas Parade, Miss Merry Christmas Pageant, and a small Community Christmas festival. These events traditionally occur on the Friday local public schools release for Christmas break. The parade begins at the Olla Elementary School and terminates in the Olla Town Square. The Olla Town Square is located within the Olla Historic District and contains the Olla Farmer's Market Community Pavilion, Dixie Center Community Center, historic marker, and a stage. The Olla Farmer's Market Pavilion and Dixie Center are owned by the Town of Olla and can be rented by the public for events.

The Historic Olla Fair Grounds is the home of the North Central Louisiana District Fair or "Olla Fair" each Fall. Established in 1912, it is considered one of the oldest continuously running agricultural fairs in the United States. The Olla Fair and Olla Fair Barns have significant local historical importance, serve the people of LaSalle, Caldwell, Winn, and Grant Parishes and attract visitors from afar each year.

The "Tri-City Popper" fireworks show, an endeavor funded by donations from the citizens and businesses of Olla, Tullos, and Urania, is held at dusk each July 4 at the Historic Olla Fairgrounds. This event is conducted by the Olla Volunteer Fire Department

Olla has a large Town Park with a paved walking trail, playground, multiple baseball fields, basketball court, fishing pond, public swimming pool, bowling alley, and a Recreation Center, locally known as the "Olla Rec Hall." The Olla Town Park is known for its Yellow Daffodils that bloom every spring. In 2012, Louisiana District 22 State Representative Terry Brown gifted 6000 yellow daffodil bulbs to Mayor Jason Chisolm to support town beautification efforts. In collaboration with the Olla Pinewood Garden Club, the bulbs were planted in the Town Park by Robert and Candy Carrol.

== Notable people ==
- Thomas "Bud" Brady, member of the Louisiana House of Representatives from 1976 to 1988
- John Cooksey, former congressman, Louisiana's 5th congressional district
- Kristy Curry, head coach of South Florida Bulls women's basketball team
- Ronald Jackson Hays, admiral, United States Navy, United States Naval Academy
- Herman Johnson, New York Giants offensive guard
- Gene Jones, film and television actor
- Billy Masters, Denver Broncos tight end
- J. Reed Walters, LaSalle Parish district attorney
