= Tullos, Louisiana =

- Town
- Town of Tullos
- Location in LaSalle Parish, Louisiana

- Location of Louisiana in the United States
- Coordinates: 31°49′08″N 92°19′45″W
- Country: United States
- State: Louisiana
- Parishes: La Salle, Winn

Area
  - Total: 1.61 sq mi (4.16 km^{2})
  - Land: 1.58 sq mi (4.10 km^{2})
  - Water: 0.019 sq mi (0.05 km^{2})
- Elevation: 125 ft (38 m)

Population (2020)
  - Total: 304
  - Density: 192/sq mi (74.1/km^{2})
- Time zone: UTC-6 (CST)
  - Summer (DST): UTC-5 (CDT)
- ZIP code: 71479
- Area code: 318
- FIPS code: 22-76615
- GNIS feature ID: 2406763

Tullos is a town in LaSalle and Winn parishes in the U.S. state of Louisiana, along Castor Creek. As of the 2020 census, Tullos had a population of 304.

== Geography ==
Tullos is located in northwestern LaSalle Parish. The northwest border of the town briefly crosses Castor Creek into Winn Parish.

U.S. Route 84 passes through the north side of the town, leading southeast 16 miles (26 km) to Jena, the parish seat, and northwest 22 miles (35 km) to Winnfield. U.S. Route 165, a four-lane divided highway, passes through the southeast corner of Tullos, leading northeast 20 miles (32 km) to Grayson and south 42 miles (68 km) to Alexandria.

According to the United States Census Bureau, Tullos has a total area of 1.6 square miles (4.2 km^{2}), of which 0.02 square miles (0.05 km^{2}), or 1.27%, are water. Via Castor Creek, Tullos is part of the Little River watershed, flowing south and southeast to Catahoula Lake.

== 1953 tornado ==
On December 3, 1953, a violent F4 tornado hit the town, causing tremendous damage. Two small children were killed, and 15 others were injured.

== Demographics ==
Historical population
Census	Pop.	Note	%±
1930	707		—
1940	589		−16.7%
1950	732		24.3%
1960	594		−18.9%
1970	600		1.0%
1980	776		29.3%
1990	427		−45.0%
2000	419		−1.9%
2010	385		−8.1%
2020	304		−21.0%
2025 (est.)	310	▲	2.0%
U.S. Decennial Census

As of the census of 2000, there were 419 people, 168 households, and 113 families residing in the town. The population density was 278.5 inhabitants per square mile (107.5/km^{2}). There were 203 housing units at an average density of 134.9 units per square mile (52.1 units/km^{2}). The racial makeup of the town was 95.70% White, 3.34% African American, and 0.95% from two or more races. Hispanic or Latino of any race were 0.48% of the population.

There were 168 households, out of which 31.5% had children under the age of 18 living with them, 57.1% were married couples living together, 6.0% had a female householder with no husband present, and 32.7% were non-families. 27.4% of all households were made up of individuals, and 14.3% had someone living alone who was 65 years of age or older. The average household size was 2.49 and the average family size was 3.06.

In the town, the population was spread out, with 25.1% under the age of 18, 7.2% from 18 to 24, 27.2% from 25 to 44, 25.3% from 45 to 64, and 15.3% who were 65 years of age or older. The median age was 37 years. For every 100 females, there were 94.0 males. For every 100 females age 18 and over, there were 93.8 males.

The median income for a household in the town was $26,484, and the median income for a family was $31,786. Males had a median income of $24,896 versus $22,143 for females. The per capita income for the town was $14,265. About 13.8% of families and 18.3% of the population were below the poverty line, including 27.7% of those under age 18 and 12.0% of those age 65 or over.

== Notable people ==
- Robert A. Doughty, American military historian and retired US Army officer
- Speedy O. Long, Louisiana state senator and U.S. congressman, born in Tullos
- Gerald Riggs, former NFL running back
