= LaSalle Parish, Louisiana =

Parish in Louisiana, United States

Coordinates: 31.68°N 92.16°W

- Parish
- Parish of LaSalle; Paroisse de La Salle (French)
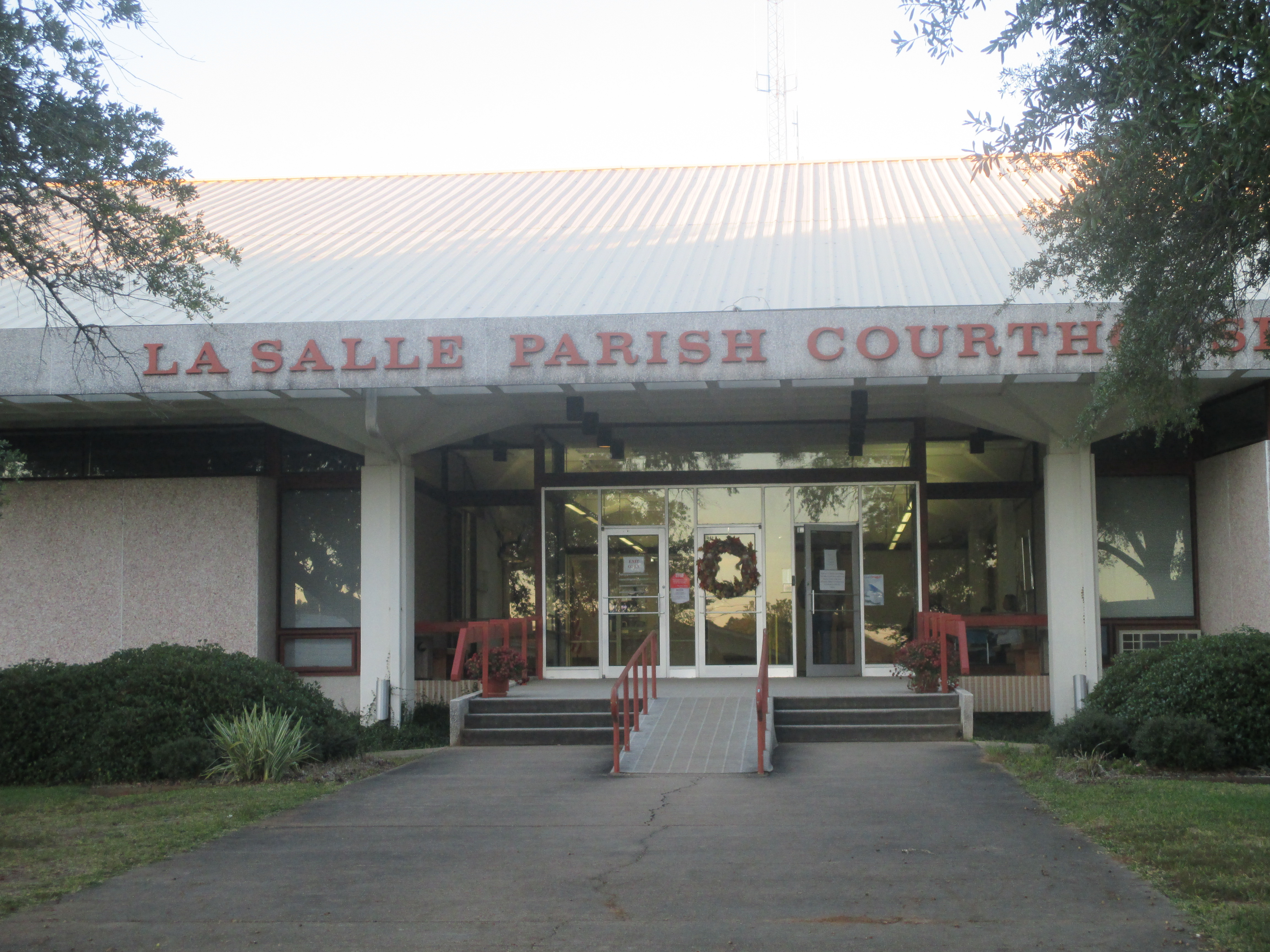
- LaSalle Parish Courthouse in Jena

- Location within the U.S. state of Louisiana

- Louisiana's location within the U.S.
- Country: United States
- State: Louisiana
- Region: Central Louisiana
- Founded: January 1, 1910
- Named for: René-Robert Cavelier, Sieur de La Salle
- Parish seat (and largest town): Jena

Area
  - Total: 662 sq mi (1,710 km^{2})
  - Land: 625 sq mi (1,620 km^{2})
  - Water: 38 sq mi (98 km^{2})

Population (2020)
  - Total: 14,791
  - Estimate (2025): 15,154 ▲
  - Density: 23.7/sq mi (9.14/km^{2})
- Time zone: UTC-6 (CST)
  - Summer (DST): UTC-5 (CDT)
- Area code: 318
- Congressional district: 5th

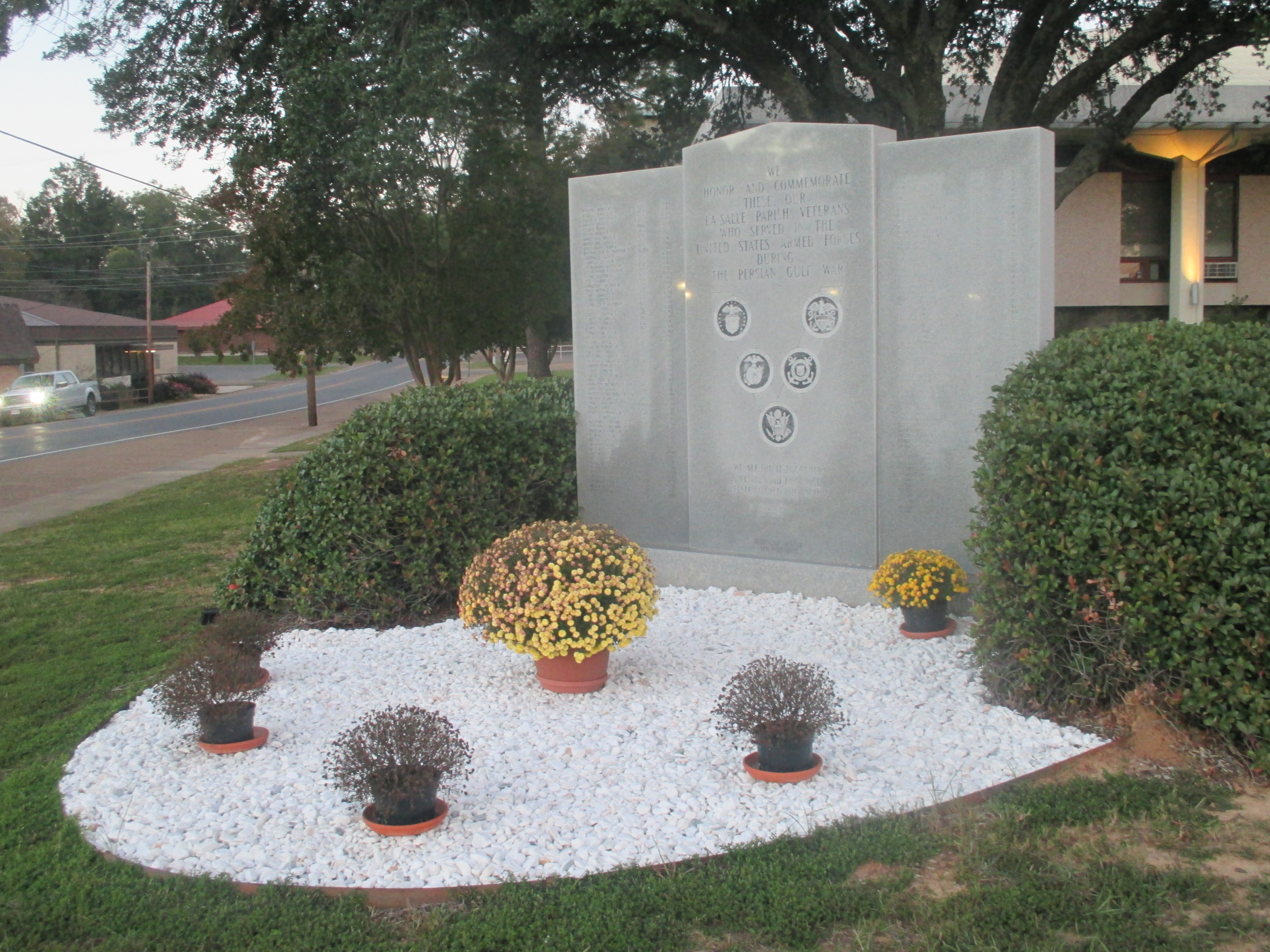
Veterans monument at the LaSalle Parish Courthouse

LaSalle Parish (French: Paroisse de La Salle) is a parish located in the U.S. state of Louisiana. As of the 2020 United States census, the population was 14,791. The parish seat is Jena. The parish was created in 1910 from the western section of Catahoula Parish.

== Name ==
The parish is named for René-Robert Cavelier, Sieur de La Salle.

There is some confusion as to whether the parish is spelled "LaSalle" (no space) or "La Salle." An example of the latter view can be seen in the photo at right of the sign over the entrance to a "La Salle Parish Courthouse." A photo of this sign is also featured on the main webpage of the LaSalle Parish Clerk of Court, but the parish is consistently spelled "LaSalle" (no space) in the website text. The prevailing spelling of the parish is "LaSalle" (no space), consistent with the U.S. Census since 2011, and as demonstrated for example by a Google Trends comparison of the phrase's different spellings.

== History ==
The parish was established (as the Parish of LaSalle) on July 3, 1908.

In 1908, when Catahoula Parish was split in half and formed LaSalle Parish an immediate struggle developed between the towns of Olla and Jena over the location of the parish courthouse and seat. Jena was subsequently chosen over Olla, the larger and more established community at the time, as the seat of government due to Jena's central location within the newly formed Parish.

== Town of Olla ==
The Town of Olla, incorporated in 1899 is the oldest incorporated town in LaSalle Parish and the Olla State Bank Building is the oldest permanent brick structure in LaSalle Parish. Settled prior to the American Civil War by the descendants of Scotch-Irish or Ulster Scot immigrants. The area around the modern Town of Olla was formerly known as Castor Sulfur Springs with a steamboat port located on nearby Bayou Castor, or locally known as Castor Creek.[5]

In 1891, the Houston, Central Arkansas, and Northern Railroad was constructed in what was then northwest Catahoula Parish miles away from the town of Castor Sulfur Springs. Castor Sulfur Springs community leaders decided that business must be moved to a new site and a railroad station for passenger and commercial services must be constructed along the new trainline to ensure the survival of Castor Sulfur Springs.

Dr. Frank Mills and Mr. J.D. Adams selected 40 acres along the new trainline and constructed a train station and laid out streets for a town-site. This transaction was recorded on February 9, 1891. During this time many names were considered for the new town. After much debate, local leaders agreed the new town shall be named in honor of Miss Olla Mills, daughter of Dr. Frank Mills and sister of Judge W.H. Mills, who were prominent residents of Castor Sulfur Springs. Ms. Olla Mills was very accomplished, intelligent, attractive, and a charming young lady who was instrumental in all community activities. Ms. Olla also served as the as Head of the Olla Military Institute English Department. Miss Olla Mills married Mr. C.C. Young and was laid to rest in the Olla Cemetery in 1901. A portrait of Ms. Olla Mills is available to view inside the Olla Town Hall.

== Geography ==
According to the U.S. Census Bureau, the parish has a total area of 662 square miles (1,710 km^{2}), of which 625 square miles (1,620 km^{2}) is land and 38 square miles (98 km^{2}) (5.7%) is water.

=== Major highways ===
- U.S. Highway 84
- U.S. Highway 165
- Louisiana Highway 8
- Louisiana Highway 28
- Louisiana Highway 124
- Louisiana Highway 125
- Louisiana Highway 126
- Louisiana Highway 127
- Louisiana Highway 459
- Louisiana Highway 460
- Louisiana Highway 500
- Louisiana Highway 503
- Louisiana Highway 506
- Louisiana Highway 770
- Louisiana Highway 771
- Louisiana Highway 772
- Louisiana Highway 773
- Louisiana Highway 774
- Louisiana Highway 776
- Louisiana Highway 777
- Louisiana Highway 778
- Louisiana Highway 843
- Louisiana Highway 3071
- Louisiana Highway 3104
- Louisiana Highway 3259

=== Adjacent parishes ===
- Caldwell Parish (north)
- Catahoula Parish (east)
- Avoyelles Parish (south)
- Rapides Parish (southwest)
- Grant Parish (west)
- Winn Parish (northwest)

=== National protected area ===
- Catahoula National Wildlife Refuge (part)

== Demographics ==
Historical population
Census	Pop.	Note	%±
1910	9,402		—
1920	9,856		4.8%
1930	11,668		18.4%
1940	10,959		−6.1%
1950	12,717		16.0%
1960	13,011		2.3%
1970	13,295		2.2%
1980	17,004		27.9%
1990	13,662		−19.7%
2000	14,282		4.5%
2010	14,890		4.3%
2020	14,791		−0.7%
2025 (est.)	15,154	▲	2.5%
U.S. Decennial Census; 1790-1960 1900-1990; 1990-2000 2010-2013

=== 2020 census ===
As of the 2020 census, there were 14,791 people, 5,140 households, and 3,643 families residing in the parish. The median age was 38.1 years; 21.8% of residents were under the age of 18 and 17.3% were 65 years of age or older.

For every 100 females there were 114.3 males, and for every 100 females age 18 and over there were 115.7 males age 18 and over.

The racial makeup of the parish was 76.7% White, 8.8% Black or African American, 0.9% American Indian and Alaska Native, 1.7% Asian, 0.1% Native Hawaiian and Pacific Islander, 8.5% from some other race, and 3.3% from two or more races. Hispanic or Latino residents of any race comprised 9.5% of the population.

Less than 0.1% of residents lived in urban areas, while 100.0% lived in rural areas.

There were 5,140 households in the parish, of which 32.5% had children under the age of 18 living in them. Of all households, 50.8% were married-couple households, 17.7% were households with a male householder and no spouse or partner present, and 26.9% were households with a female householder and no spouse or partner present. About 27.1% of all households were made up of individuals and 13.3% had someone living alone who was 65 years of age or older.

There were 6,151 housing units, of which 16.4% were vacant. Among occupied housing units, 79.5% were owner-occupied and 20.5% were renter-occupied. The homeowner vacancy rate was 1.5% and the rental vacancy rate was 10.4%.

=== Racial and ethnic composition ===
La Salle Parish, Louisiana – Racial and ethnic composition Note: the US Census treats Hispanic/Latino as an ethnic category. This table excludes Latinos from the racial categories and assigns them to a separate category. Hispanics/Latinos may be of any race.
Race / Ethnicity (NH = Non-Hispanic)	Pop 1980	Pop 1990	Pop 2000	Pop 2010	Pop 2020	% 1980	% 1990	% 2000	% 2010	% 2020
White alone (NH)	15,158	12,247	12,225	12,520	11,263	89.14%	89.64%	85.60%	84.08%	76.15%
Black or African American alone (NH)	1,582	1,256	1,732	1,758	1,283	9.30%	9.19%	12.13%	11.81%	8.67%
Native American or Alaska Native alone (NH)	143	77	91	146	133	0.84%	0.56%	0.64%	0.98%	0.90%
Asian alone (NH)	21	36	25	26	252	0.12%	0.26%	0.18%	0.17%	1.70%
Native Hawaiian or Pacific Islander alone (NH)	x	x	1	1	10	x	x	0.01%	0.01%	0.07%
Other race alone (NH)	20	0	6	3	26	0.12%	0.00%	0.04%	0.02%	0.18%
Mixed race or Multiracial (NH)	x	x	85	105	422	x	x	0.60%	0.71%	2.85%
Hispanic or Latino (any race)	80	46	117	331	1,402	0.47%	0.34%	0.82%	2.22%	9.48%
Total	17,004	13,662	14,282	14,890	14,791	100.00%	100.00%	100.00%	100.00%	100.00%

=== 2000 census ===
As of the census of 2000, there were 14,282 people, 5,291 households, and 3,798 families residing in the parish. The population density was 23 people per square mile (8.9 people/km^{2}). There were 6,273 housing units at an average density of 10 per square mile (3.9/km^{2}). The racial makeup of the parish was 86.13% White, 12.20% Black or African American, 0.64% Native American, 0.18% Asian, 0.01% Pacific Islander, 0.20% from other races, and 0.64% from two or more races. 0.82% of the population were Hispanic or Latino of any race.

There were 5,291 households, out of which 33.60% had children under the age of 18 living with them, 59.00% were married couples living together, 9.80% had a female householder with no husband present, and 28.20% were non-families. 25.70% of all households were made up of individuals, and 13.00% had someone living alone who was 65 years of age or older. The average household size was 2.52 and the average family size was 3.03.

In the parish the population was spread out, with 26.10% under the age of 18, 9.40% from 18 to 24, 27.20% from 25 to 44, 22.60% from 45 to 64, and 14.80% who were 65 years of age or older. The median age was 36 years. For every 100 females there were 100.30 males. For every 100 females age 18 and over, there were 97.20 males.

The median income for a household in the parish was $28,189, and the median income for a family was $36,197. Males had a median income of $27,431 versus $19,697 for females. The per capita income for the parish was $14,033. About 14.90% of families and 18.70% of the population were below the poverty line, including 23.70% of those under age 18 and 18.90% of those age 65 or over.

== National Guard ==
The 1087TH Transportation Company of the 165TH CSS (combat service support) Battalion of the 139TH RSG (regional support group) resides in Jena, Louisiana.

== Communities ==
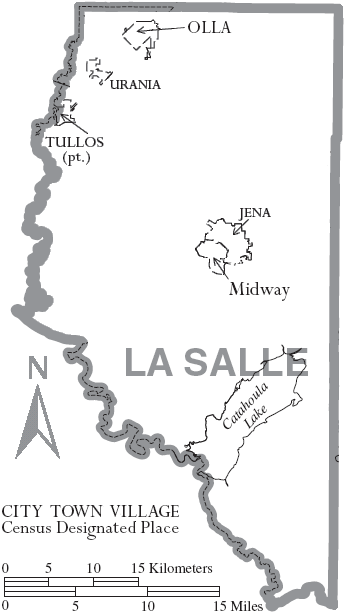
Map of LaSalle Parish, with municipal labels

=== Towns ===
- Jena
- Olla
- Tullos
- Urania

=== Unincorporated areas ===
==== Census-designated place ====
- Good Pine
- Midway
- Trout

==== Other unincorporated communities ====
- Standard
- Summerville

== Notable people ==
- Thomas "Bud" Brady, member of the Louisiana House of Representatives from 1976 to 1988
- Mike Francis, former Louisiana Republican state chairman
- Henry E. Hardtner, lumberman known as "Louisiana's first conservationist", member of both houses of the Louisiana State Legislature, LaSalle Parish police juror, founder of Urania
- Speedy O. Long, state senator, U.S. representative, district attorney
- Jeffery Simmons, Football player for the Tennessee Titans

== Politics ==
LaSalle Parish has been staunchly Republican since 1956, except in 1968 when it voted strongly for American Independent nominee George Wallace. Prior to that, it had been heavily Democratic, but no Democratic nominee since 1956 besides Jimmy Carter has passed forty percent of the parish's vote, with Hillary Clinton, Joe Biden, and Kamala Harris not even reaching double digits. In 2008 John McCain's performance was the strongest of any Republican in Parish history; every subsequent presidential election through 2024 has broken this record.

United States presidential election results for LaSalle Parish, Louisiana
Year	Republican		Democratic		Third party(ies)	
Year	No.	%	No.	%	No.	%
1912	7	1.26%	366	65.95%	182	32.79%
1916	20	3.13%	610	95.61%	8	1.25%
1920	109	15.71%	570	82.13%	15	2.16%
1924	102	17.93%	456	80.14%	11	1.93%
1928	450	33.81%	881	66.19%	0	0.00%
1932	117	6.30%	1,738	93.64%	1	0.05%
1936	256	13.48%	1,643	86.52%	0	0.00%
1940	258	11.18%	2,039	88.38%	10	0.43%
1944	504	19.78%	2,018	79.20%	26	1.02%
1948	266	9.67%	716	26.03%	1,769	64.30%
1952	1,692	45.82%	2,001	54.18%	0	0.00%
1956	1,885	61.56%	951	31.06%	226	7.38%
1960	2,123	55.26%	843	21.94%	876	22.80%
1964	4,319	83.33%	864	16.67%	0	0.00%
1968	1,258	21.52%	710	12.15%	3,878	66.34%
1972	3,858	81.51%	651	13.75%	224	4.73%
1976	3,161	50.10%	2,961	46.93%	188	2.98%
1980	3,792	57.16%	2,665	40.17%	177	2.67%
1984	5,404	78.60%	1,318	19.17%	153	2.23%
1988	4,559	71.69%	1,622	25.51%	178	2.80%
1992	3,068	45.63%	2,389	35.53%	1,266	18.83%
1996	2,925	44.96%	2,543	39.09%	1,038	15.95%
2000	4,564	74.72%	1,397	22.87%	147	2.41%
2004	5,015	80.39%	1,155	18.52%	68	1.09%
2008	5,602	85.49%	860	13.12%	91	1.39%
2012	5,726	87.13%	764	11.63%	82	1.25%
2016	5,836	88.84%	605	9.21%	128	1.95%
2020	6,378	90.12%	638	9.02%	61	0.86%
2024	6,023	90.98%	546	8.25%	51	0.77%

== See also ==
- National Register of Historic Places listings in LaSalle Parish, Louisiana
- LaSalle Parish School Board
