= Jena, Louisiana =

- Town
- Town of Jena
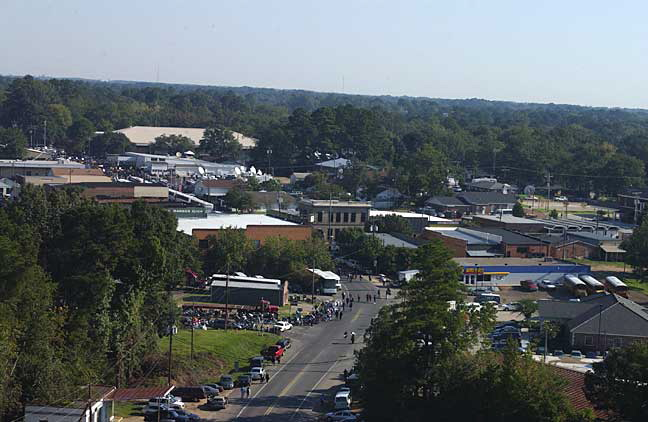

- Location of Jena in LaSalle Parish, Louisiana.

- Location of Louisiana in the United States
- Coordinates: 31°41′0″N 92°8′0″W
- Country: United States
- State: Louisiana
- Parish: La Salle

Government
  - Mayor: Ladawn C. Edwards

Area
  - Total: 5.53 sq mi (14.32 km^{2})
  - Land: 5.50 sq mi (14.24 km^{2})
  - Water: 0.031 sq mi (0.08 km^{2})
- Elevation: 187 ft (57 m)

Population (2020)
  - Total: 4,155
  - Density: 756/sq mi (291.8/km^{2})
- Time zone: UTC-6 (CST)
  - Summer (DST): UTC-5 (CDT)
- ZIP code: 71342
- Area code: 318
- FIPS code: 22-38285
- GNIS feature ID: 2405911
- Website: townofjena.com

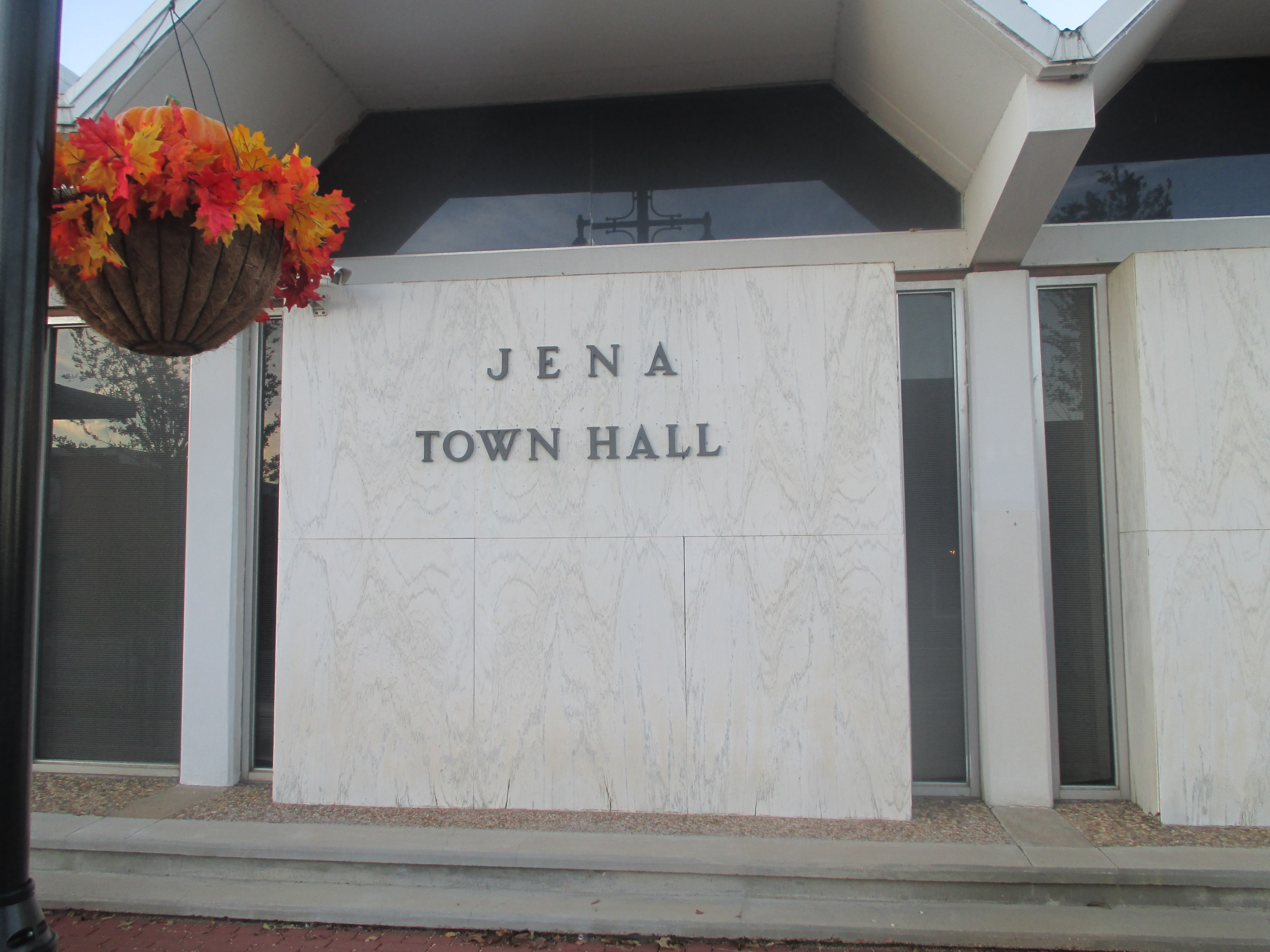
Jena Town Hall

Jena (/ˈdʒiːnə/) is a town in, and the parish seat of, La Salle Parish, Louisiana, United States. The population was 4,155 at the 2020 census.

== History ==
Jena was named for Jena, Germany, where French Emperor Napoleon I won the Battle of Jena-Auerstedt in 1806.

In September 2006, Jena became the focus of national news stories in the United States for a racial controversy involving its school system and a group of students known as the Jena Six.

== Geography ==
According to the United States Census Bureau, the town has an area of 5.4 square miles (14 km^{2}), all land.

=== Surrounding communities ===
Residents of these rural communities frequent Jena for school, work, and shopping.

- Midway
- Olla, Louisiana
- Jonesville, Louisiana
- Trout, Louisiana

=== Climate ===
This region experiences hot summers with rainy days, with no average monthly temperatures above 92 °F. According to the Köppen Climate Classification system, Jena has a humid subtropical climate, abbreviated "Cfa" on climate maps.

There are mild winters during which intense rainfall occurs. It has hot, rainy summers with moderate rainfall through all year months.

Snow in Jena is possible in winter months.

Average annual precipitation is 59.4 inches (1,510 mm). There are on annual average 76 days with measurable precipitation.

Climate data for Jena, Louisiana (1991–2020 normals, extremes 1985–present)
Month	Jan	Feb	Mar	Apr	May	Jun	Jul	Aug	Sep	Oct	Nov	Dec	Year
Record high °F (°C)	83 (28)	84 (29)	87 (31)	95 (35)	96 (36)	103 (39)	104 (40)	109 (43)	110 (43)	96 (36)	89 (32)	83 (28)	110 (43)
Mean maximum °F (°C)	75.4 (24.1)	78.5 (25.8)	83.6 (28.7)	86.5 (30.3)	90.5 (32.5)	94.6 (34.8)	97.7 (36.5)	98.6 (37.0)	96.0 (35.6)	90.2 (32.3)	82.4 (28.0)	77.6 (25.3)	100.1 (37.8)
Mean daily maximum °F (°C)	57.1 (13.9)	61.6 (16.4)	69.2 (20.7)	75.6 (24.2)	82.8 (28.2)	88.8 (31.6)	91.3 (32.9)	91.7 (33.2)	87.5 (30.8)	78.1 (25.6)	67.0 (19.4)	59.1 (15.1)	75.8 (24.3)
Daily mean °F (°C)	46.6 (8.1)	50.6 (10.3)	57.9 (14.4)	64.4 (18.0)	72.4 (22.4)	78.8 (26.0)	81.5 (27.5)	81.2 (27.3)	76.4 (24.7)	65.8 (18.8)	55.4 (13.0)	48.8 (9.3)	65.0 (18.3)
Mean daily minimum °F (°C)	36.2 (2.3)	39.7 (4.3)	46.6 (8.1)	53.1 (11.7)	61.9 (16.6)	68.8 (20.4)	71.7 (22.1)	70.8 (21.6)	65.3 (18.5)	53.5 (11.9)	43.8 (6.6)	38.4 (3.6)	54.1 (12.3)
Mean minimum °F (°C)	19.5 (−6.9)	24.8 (−4.0)	27.4 (−2.6)	34.9 (1.6)	46.7 (8.2)	58.4 (14.7)	64.9 (18.3)	62.9 (17.2)	50.7 (10.4)	36.0 (2.2)	27.1 (−2.7)	23.1 (−4.9)	18.4 (−7.6)
Record low °F (°C)	11 (−12)	9 (−13)	16 (−9)	26 (−3)	38 (3)	49 (9)	57 (14)	51 (11)	41 (5)	27 (−3)	20 (−7)	6 (−14)	6 (−14)
Average precipitation inches (mm)	5.69 (145)	5.53 (140)	5.71 (145)	5.38 (137)	4.43 (113)	4.86 (123)	4.51 (115)	3.80 (97)	3.60 (91)	4.72 (120)	5.46 (139)	5.82 (148)	59.51 (1,512)
Average snowfall inches (cm)	0.0 (0.0)	0.3 (0.76)	0.0 (0.0)	0.0 (0.0)	0.0 (0.0)	0.0 (0.0)	0.0 (0.0)	0.0 (0.0)	0.0 (0.0)	0.0 (0.0)	0.0 (0.0)	0.2 (0.51)	0.5 (1.3)
Average precipitation days (≥ 0.01 in)	8.6	8.4	7.9	6.7	7.3	8.4	8.8	7.1	5.3	6.1	6.6	8.0	89.2
Average snowy days (≥ 0.1 in)	0.1	0.1	0.1	0.0	0.0	0.0	0.0	0.0	0.0	0.0	0.0	0.2	0.5
Source: NOAA

== Demographics ==
Historical population
Census	Pop.	Note	%±
1910	689		—
1920	620		−10.0%
1930	1,007		62.4%
1940	946		−6.1%
1950	1,438		52.0%
1960	2,098		45.9%
1970	2,431		15.9%
1980	4,375		80.0%
1990	2,626		−40.0%
2000	2,971		13.1%
2010	3,398		14.4%
2020	4,155		22.3%
2025 (est.)	4,229	▲	1.8%
U.S. Decennial Census

=== 2020 census ===
As of the 2020 census, Jena had a population of 4,155. The median age was 35.8 years. 17.2% of residents were under the age of 18 and 14.7% of residents were 65 years of age or older. For every 100 females, there were 145.6 males, and for every 100 females age 18 and over, there were 158.5 males age 18 and over.

0.0% of residents lived in urban areas, while 100.0% lived in rural areas.

There were 1,164 households in Jena, of which 33.6% had children under the age of 18 living in them. There were 884 families residing in the town. Of all households, 44.8% were married-couple households, 19.2% were households with a male householder and no spouse or partner present, and 31.2% were households with a female householder and no spouse or partner present. About 30.8% of all households were made up of individuals, and 15.0% had someone living alone who was 65 years of age or older.

There were 1,360 housing units, of which 14.4% were vacant. The homeowner vacancy rate was 2.2% and the rental vacancy rate was 12.8%.

Racial composition as of the 2020 census
Race	Number	Percent
White	2,466	59.4%
Black or African American	452	10.9%
American Indian and Alaska Native	23	0.6%
Asian	105	2.5%
Native Hawaiian and Other Pacific Islander	5	0.1%
Some other race	981	23.6%
Two or more races	123	3.0%
Hispanic or Latino (of any race)	1,024	24.6%

=== 2000 census ===
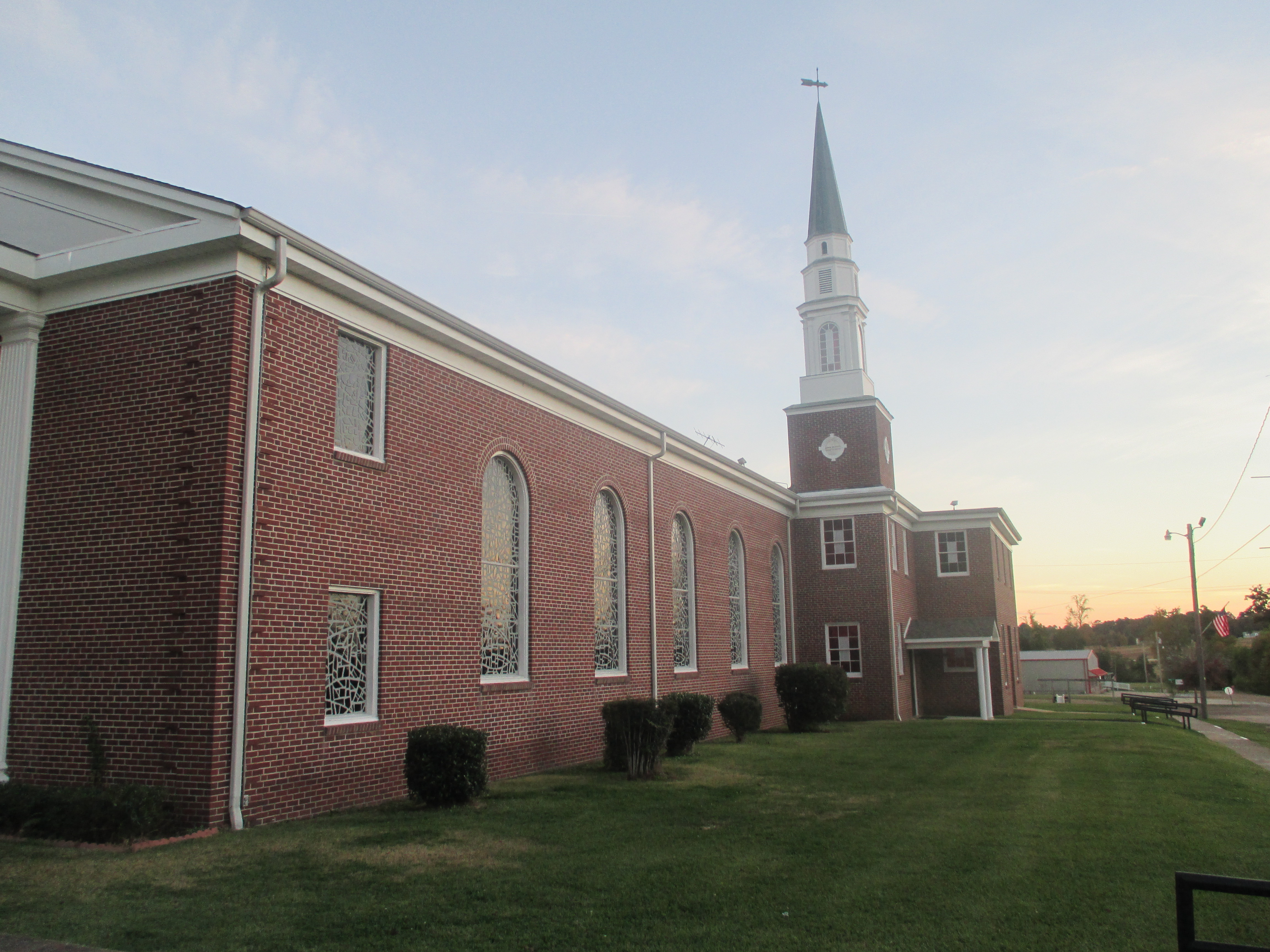
First Baptist Church of Jena

As of the census of 2000, there were 2,971 people, 1,135 households, and 749 families residing in the town. The population density was 552.7 inhabitants per square mile (213.4/km^{2}). There were 1,264 housing units at an average density of 235.2 per square mile (90.8/km^{2}). The racial makeup of the town was 85.56% White, 12.02% African American, 0.67% Native American, 0.47% Asian, 0.50% from other races, and 0.77% from two or more races. Hispanic or Latino of any race were 1.21% of the population.

There were 1,135 households, out of which 29.3% had children under the age of 18 living with them, 52.9% were married couples living together, 10.3% had a female householder with no husband present, and 34.0% were non-families. 31.4% of all households were 21 years of age or older. The average household size was 2.29 and the average family size was 2.86.

In the town, the population was spread out, with 27.5% under the age of 18, 8.8% from 18 to 24, 22.5% from 25 to 44, 22.8% from 45 to 64, and 18.4% who were 65 years of age or older. The median age was 39 years. For every 100 females, there were 98.9 males. For every 100 females age 18 and over, there were 84.7 males.

The median income for a household in the town was $30,938, and the median income for a family was $39,848. Males had a median income of $31,332 versus $18,317 for females. The per capita income for the town was $13,761. About 9.9% of families and 15.1% of the population were below the poverty line, including 20.2% of those under age 18 and 17.0% of those age 65 or over.

== Media ==
=== Newspaper ===
- The Jena Times (established c. 1905)

=== Radio ===
Frequency	Callsign	Format	Owner
88.1	KAYT	Urban/Christian	Black Media Works, Inc.
102.7	KJNA	Country	Cloessner News & Broadcasting LLC.

== Education ==
The LaSalle Parish School Board is located in Jena.

The following schools serve Jena:

- Jena High School, 9–12 (Jena)
- Jena Junior High School, 6,7, & 8 (Jena)
- Goodpine Middle School, 3,4, & 5 (Trout/Goodpine)
- Jena Elementary School, PreK - 2 (Jena)
- Fellowship Elementary School, Pre-K-8 (Belah)
- Nebo Elementary School, PreK-8 (Nebo)
- Temple Christian Academy, Private PreK-8 (Jena)

== Notable people ==
- Woodie Flowers, MIT professor and co-founder of FIRST
- Mike Francis, prominent businessman and former Louisiana Republican state chairman; born in Jena
- Jason Hatcher, former NFL football player for the Washington Commanders
- Jay F. Honeycutt, former director of the Kennedy Space Center
- Speedy O. Long (1928–2006), a member of the Long political dynasty
- Jeffery Simmons , NFL Defensive lineman; born in Jena.
