= List of rivers of Louisiana =

List of rivers of Louisiana (U.S. state).

== By drainage basin ==
Major waterways of Louisiana.'"`UNIQ--ref-00000005-QINU`"' West to East: '"`UNIQ--templatestyles-00000006-QINU`"'
- Sabine R.
- Red R.
- Calcasieu R.
- Mermentau R.
- Ouachita R.
- Vermilion R.
- Bayou Teche
- Atchafalaya R.
- Mississippi R.
- Bayou Lafourche
- Amite R.
- Tangipahoa R.
- Tchefuncte R.
- Pearl R.

This list is arranged by drainage basin, with respective tributaries indented under each larger stream's name.

=== Gulf of Mexico ===
==== East of the Mississippi ====
- Pearl River
  - Bogue Chitto River
- The Rigolets
  - Lake St. Catherine
    - Lake Pontchartrain
      - Lacombe Bayou
      - Tchefuncte River
        - Bogue Falaya
          - Abita River
      - Tangipahoa River
        - Sims Creek
      - Pass Manchac
        - Lake Maurepas
          - Tickfaw River
            - Natalbany River
              - Ponchatoula Creek
            - Blood River
          - Amite River
            - Bayou Manchac
            - Comite River
              - Comite Creek
          - Blind River
            - Petite Amite River
              - New River
- Bayou Bienvenue

==== Mississippi River ====
- Mississippi River

===== Distributaries =====
- Bayou Lafourche
  - Bayou Terrebonne
    - Bayou Black
    - Bayou du Large
    - Bayou Grand Caillou
    - Bayou Petit Caillou
- Atchafalaya River
  - Bayou Cocodrie
  - Bayou Teche
    - Bayou Boeuf
  - Bayou Long
    - Belle River
      - Big Goddel Bayou
        - Bay Natchez
          - Chopin Chute
            - Lower Grand River
              - Upper Grand River
              - Bayou Plaquemine
  - Rouge Bayou
    - Bayou Jack
  - Bayou des Glaises

===== Tributaries =====
- Bayou Pierre
- Coles Creek
- Yazoo River
- Red River

===== Red River =====
- Red River
  - Black River
    - Little River
      - Castor Creek
      - Dugdemona River
    - Tensas River
      - Bayou Macon
    - Ouachita River
      - Boeuf River
        - Bayou Bonne Idee
        - Bayou Lafourche (Boeuf River tributary)
        - Big Creek
      - Bayou D'Arbonne
        - Cornie Bayou
      - Bayou de Loutre
      - Bayou Bartholomew
  - Cane River
  - Old River (Natchitoches Parish)
    - Bayou Brevelle
    - Kisatchie Bayou
  - Saline Bayou
    - Black Lake Bayou
  - Bayou Pierre
    - Prairie River
  - Loggy Bayou
    - Flat River
      - Red Chute Bayou
        - Bodcau Bayou
    - Dorcheat Bayou
  - Cross Bayou
    - Twelvemile Bayou
      - Black Bayou

==== Gulf west of the Mississippi ====
- Vermilion River
  - Bayou Carencro
  - Bayou Fusilier
    - Bayou Bourbeux
- Mermentau River
  - Bayou Queue de Tortue
  - Bayou Nezpique
  - Bayou des Cannes
    - Bayou Mallet
  - Bayou Plaquemine Brule
    - Bayou Wikoff
- Calcasieu Pass / Calcasieu Ship Channel
  - Calcasieu River
    - West Fork Calcasieu River
      - Houston River
  - Ouiski Chitto Creek
- Sabine River
  - Old River
  - Bayou Anacoco

== Alphabetically ==
- Abita River
- Amite River
- Antoine Creek
- Atchafalaya River
- Bay Natchez
- Bayou Bartholomew
- Bayou Bienvenue
- Bayou Bourbeux
- Bayou Bonfouca
- Bayou Brevelle
- Bayou Carencro
- Bayou Chicot
- Bayou Choupic
- Bayou Courtableau
- Bayou des Cannes
- Bayou des Glaises
- Bayou Fusilier
- Bayou Jack
- Bayou Lafourche, Mississippi River distributary
- Bayou Lafourche (Boeuf River tributary)
- Bayou Long
- Bayou Macon
- Bayou Mallet
- Bayou Manchac
- Bayou Nezpique
- Bayou Pierre
- Bayou Pierre
- Bayou Plaquemine Brule
- Bayou Plaquemine (Grand River tributary)
- Bayou Queue de Tortue
- Bayou Teche
- Bayou Wikoff
- Big Goddel Bayou
- Black Bayou
- Black Lake Bayou
- Black River
- Blind River
- Boeuf River
- Bogue Chitto River
- Bogue Falaya
- Calcasieu River
- Cane River
- Castor Creek
- Chopin Chute
- Coles Creek
- Comite River
- Dorcheat Bayou
- Dugdemona River
- Flat River
- Houston River
- Irish Bayou
- Kisatchie Bayou
- Little River - tributary of the Black (Ouachita) River
- Loggy Bayou
- Mermentau River
- Mississippi River
- Natalbany River
- New River
- Old River (Natchitoches Parish)
- Old River (Louisiana), in Pointe Coupee and West Feliciana parishes
- Old River (Sabine River tributary)
- Ouachita River
- Ouiski Chitto Creek
- Pass Manchac
- Pearl River
- Ponchatoula Creek
- Prairie River (Louisiana)
- Red River
- Rouge Bayou
- Rigolets
- Sabine River
- Saline Bayou
- Sims Creek
- Tangipahoa River
- Tchefuncte River
- Tensas River
- Tickfaw River
- Twelvemile Bayou
- Vermilion River
- Yazoo River

== See also ==
- List of rivers in the United States
