= List of dams and reservoirs in Louisiana =

The following is a list of dams and reservoirs in Louisiana, including major dams. The National Inventory of Dams defines any "major dam" as being 50 feet (15 m) tall with a storage capacity of at least 5,000 acre-feet (6,200,000 m^{3}), or of any height with a storage capacity of 25,000 acre-feet (31,000,000 m^{3}).

== Dams and reservoirs ==
- Bayou Bonne Idee Dam (Built in 1956 at 25 feet): Morehouse Parish
- Bayou Bonne Idee North Dam (Built in 1988 at 16 ft): Morehouse Parish, Louisiana.
- Bayou Bonne Idee Upper Dam (Built in 1955 at 25 feet in Morehouse Parish):
- Bayou Cocodrie Dam: (Built in 1959 at 28 feet in Evangeline Parish
- Bayou Darbonne Dam and Reservoir: (Built in 1959 at 54 ft in Union Parish).
- Bayou De Siard Dam (built in 1933; 42 feet in Ouachita Parish).
- Bayou Desiard Bartholomew Dam: (Built in 1930 at 22 feet in Ouachita Parish).
- Bayou Desiard Upper Milhaven Dam: (Built in 1940 at 19 feet in Ouachita Parish.
- Black Bayou Dam (Built in 1955 at 20 feet in Caddo Parish):
- Black Lake Bayou Reservoir Dam: (Built in 1990 at 37 feet in Natchitoches.
- Black Pond Dam: (Built in 1928 at 10 feet in Jackson Parish.
- Boeuf River Dam Mi 51: (Built in 1966 at 37 feet in Richland Parish)
- Brazzel Impoundment Dam: (Built in 2018 at 15 feet in De Soto Parish, Louisiana
- Bundick Creek Dam: (Built in 1963 at 40 feet in Beauregard Parish)
- Caddo Dam: (1971 at 36 feet on the Twelve Mile Bayou River in Caddo Parish)
- Cane River Dam: (Built in 1949 at 32 feet in Natchitoches Parish)
- Cane River Lake Dam Lower Embankment: (Built in 1955 at 44 feet in Natchitoches Parish.
- Caney Creek Dam: (Built in 1986 at 73 feet in Jackson Parish)
- Catahoula Lake Control Structure Dam: (Built in 1972 at 38 feet in LaSalle Parish)
- Cheniere Brake Dam: (Built in 1943 at 25 feet in Ouachita, Louisiana)
- Chicot Lake Dam: (Built in 1940 at 29 feet in Evangeline)
- Chivery Dam: (Built in 1934 at 30-feet, in Natchitoches Parish.
- Cleco Rodemacher Dam: Built in 1974 at 25 feet in Rapides Parish, 6,050 feet (1,840 m) in length.
- Corney Dam: Built in 1937 at 22 feet, in Claiborne Parish.
- Cotile Lake Dam: Built in 1965 at 31 feet in Rapides Parish.
- Cross Lake Dam and Spillway: Built in 1925 at 50 feet in Caddo Parish, the dam is 10,820 feet long with a 215,000 acre-feet capacity.
- Cypress Black Bayou Site 1 Dam: Built in 1975 at 46 feet in Bossier Parish, the dam is 7,100 feet long with a 77,000 acre-feet capacity.
- Cypress Black Bayou Site 2 Dam: Built in 1975 at 34 feet in Bossier Parish, the dam is 4,800 feet with an 18,000 acre-feet capacity.
- False River Drainage Structure Dam: Built in 1948 at 31 feet in Pointe Coupee Parish, the dam is 110 feet with a 160,000 acre-feet capacity.
- Grand Bayou Reservoir Dam: Built in 1994 at 30 feet in Red River Parish, the dam is 5,800 feet with a 66,000 acre-feet capacity.
- Hannas Run Dam: Built in 1908 at 15 feet in Ouachita Parish, the dam is 1,100 feet with a 10,660 acre-feet capacity.
- Hodges Garden Dam: Built in 1954 at 47 feet in Sabine Parish, the dam is 1,940 feet with a 6,820 acre-feet capacity. The reservoir includes House, Bear, and Nandina islands.
- Iatt Lake Dam: Built in 1956 at 36 feet in Grant Parish, the dam is 5,310 feet with a 167,000 acre-feet capacity.
- Indian Creek Dam: Built in 1972 at 38 feet in Rapides Parish, the dam is 7,900 feet with a 51,250 acre-feet capacity.
- Ivan Lake Dam: Built in 1958 at 21 feet in Bossier Parish, the dam is 1,120 feet with a 7,800 acre-feet capacity.
- Kepler Creek Dam: Built in 1958 at 28 feet in Bienville Parish, the dam is 2,018 feet with a 50,000 acre-feet capacity.
- Kincaid Reservoir Dam: Built in 1972 at 36 feet in Rapides Parish, the dam is 5,360 feet with a 48,420 acre-feet capacity.
- Lake Bistineau Dam: Built in 1941 at 27 feet in Bossier Parish, the dam is 7,500 feet with a 318,000 acre-feet capacity.
- Lake Claiborne Dam: Built in 1966 at 70 feet in Claiborne Parish, the dam is 5,500 feet long with a 200,000 acre-feet capacity.
- Lake Martin Dam: Built in 1952 at 15 feet in St. Martin Parish the dam is 26,996 feet long with a 5,300 acre-feet capacity.
- Lake Providence Baxter Bayou Weir Dam: Built in 1972 at 10 feet in East Carroll Parish, the dam is 52 feet long with a 21,390 acre-feet capacity.
- Larto Lake Dam: Built in 1959 at 38 feet in Catahoula Parish, the dam is 2,930 feet long with a 126,000 acre-feet capacity. The surface area is 8,200 acres.
- Lilly Bayou Control Structure Dam: Built in 2011 at 38 feet in East Baton Rouge Parish, the dam is 308 feet long with a 5,800 acre-feet capacity.
- Little River Dam & Control Structure: Built in 1955 at 15 feet in Avoyelles Parish, the dam is 930 feet long with a 103,000 acre-feet capacity.
- Lower Anacoco Dam: Built in 1951 at 37 feet in Vernon Parish, the dam is 5,170 feet long with a 82,500 acre-feet capacity.
- Mill Creek Dam: Built in 1971 at 67 feet in Bienville Parish, the dam is 1,540 feet long with a 21,400 acre-feet capacity.
- Millers Lake Dam: Built in 1929 at 8 feet in Evangeline Parish, the dam is 36,475 feet long with a 24,000 acre-feet capacity.
- Murray Lake Dam: Built in 1955 at 40 feet in Webster Parish, the dam is 31,190 feet long with a 16,039 acre-feet capacity.
- Nantachie Lake Dam: Built in 1964 at 37 feet in Grant Parish, the dam is 1,150 feet long with a 35,500 acre-feet capacity.
- Nantachie Lake Dam No. 2: Built in 1961 at 29 feet in Grant Parish, the dam is 2,690 feet long with a 35,500 acre-feet capacity.
- Old Lake Dam: Built in 1940 at 15 feet in Evangeline Parish, the dam is 2,050 feet long with a 5,600 acre-feet capacity.
- Poverty Point Reservoir Dam: Built in 1998 at 42 feet in Richland Parish, the dam is 25,650 feet long with a 31,000 acre-feet capacity.
- Saline Lake Dam: Built in 1992 at 23 feet in Winn Parish, the dam is 16,300 feet longwith a 60,000 acre-feet normsl and 122,000 acre-feet mazimum capacity.
- Sibley Lake Dam: Built in 1962 at 36 feet in Natchitoches Parish, the dam is 6,045 feet long with a normal capacity of 19,500 acre-feet and a maximum of 56,700 acre-feet capacity.
- Smithport Lake Dam: Built in 1953 at 18 feet in De Soto Parish, the dam is 2,500 feet long with a 42,000 acre-feet capacity.
- Spanish Lake Dam: Built in 1958 at 18 feet in St. Martin Parish, the dam is 20,740 feet long with a 9,100 acre-feet capacity.
- Toledo Bend Reservoir Dam: Built in 1966 at 112 feet in Sabine Parish, the dam is 10,350 feet long with a 5,097,500 acre-feet capacity.
- Turkey Creek Dam: Built in 1953 at 40 feet in Franklin Parish, Louisiana, the dam is 4,500 feet long with a 85,000 acre-feet capacity.
- Upper Bayou Nezpique No 3 Dam: Built in 1974 at 21 feet in Evangeline Parish, the dam is 2,150 feet long with a 5,495 acre-feet capacity.
- Vernon Lake Dam: Built in 1961 at 43 feet in Vernon Parish, the dam is 5,275 feet long with a 99,473 acre-feet capacity.
- Wham Brake Lake Dam: Built in 1950 at 9 feet in Ouachita Parish, the dam is 30,648 feet long with a 34,650 acre-feet capacity.
