= Kepler Lake =

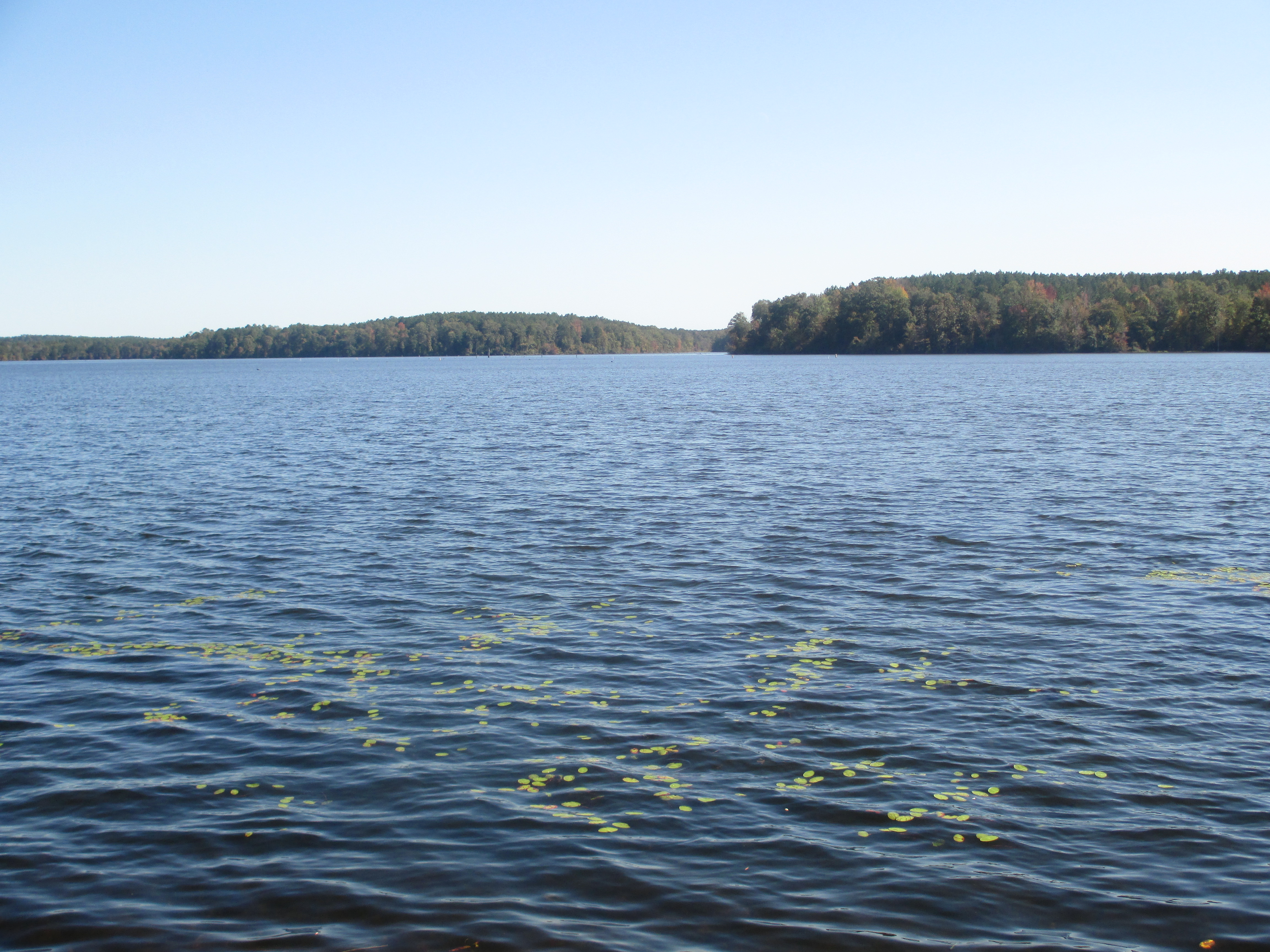
- Salvinia on the surface of Kepler Lake

- Location within Louisiana Location within the United States
- Location: Bienville Parish, near Jamestown, Louisiana
- Coordinates: 32°19′01″N 93°09′11″W
- Type: Reservoir
- Primary outflows: Spills into Kepler Creek which runs into Black Lake Bayou
- Basin countries: United States
- Max. length: 3 mi (4.8 km)
- Max. width: About 1.6 mi (2.6 km)
- Surface area: 2,000 acres (8.1 km^{2})
- Surface elevation: 171 ft (52 m)
- Settlements: Bienville, Castor, Gibsland, Jamestown, Kepler, Sparta, Sailes

Kepler Lake (French: Lac Kepler) is a reservoir located in Northwest Louisiana, USA. It is about 5 miles (8.0 km) from Castor, 4 miles (6.4 km) from Jamestown, 6 miles (9.7 km) from Bienville and about 12 miles (19 km) from Gibsland, Louisiana. Kepler is an open lake available for fishing and boating. Kepler's spillway drains into Black Lake Bayou which drains into Black Lake in Natchitoches Parish. Piney Woods Road is the only road that crosses Kepler. The Kepler spillway is located on the south side of the lake. Kepler has several boat launches and landings used for camping. Construction of the spillway was completed in 1958.

Kepler is home to a variety of wildlife ranging from alligators, bass, bream, perch, gar, and most notably its catfish.

Kepler has many houses on its banks. People who live about the waterway are referred to as the Kepler Lake Community. The Kepler Lake Community have Jamestown addresses and ZIP Codes but Castor phone numbers and live within the Castor district of the Bienville Parish School Board.

== Landscape ==
Kepler Lake is small in comparison to other lakes in Louisiana. At the main boat launch—near the spillway—one can see across the entirety of the lake to the white-concrete Piney Woods road bridge. Channels have been cut into Kepler Lake to ensure boaters do not run their boats onto stumps. In recent years, there have been extensive draining of Kepler just to remove the stumps.

== Geography ==
Kepler's coordinates are N 32.31682 and W -93.1535 and its altitude is 171 feet (52 m).
