= Great Raft =

Giant log jam in the Red and Atchafalaya Rivers

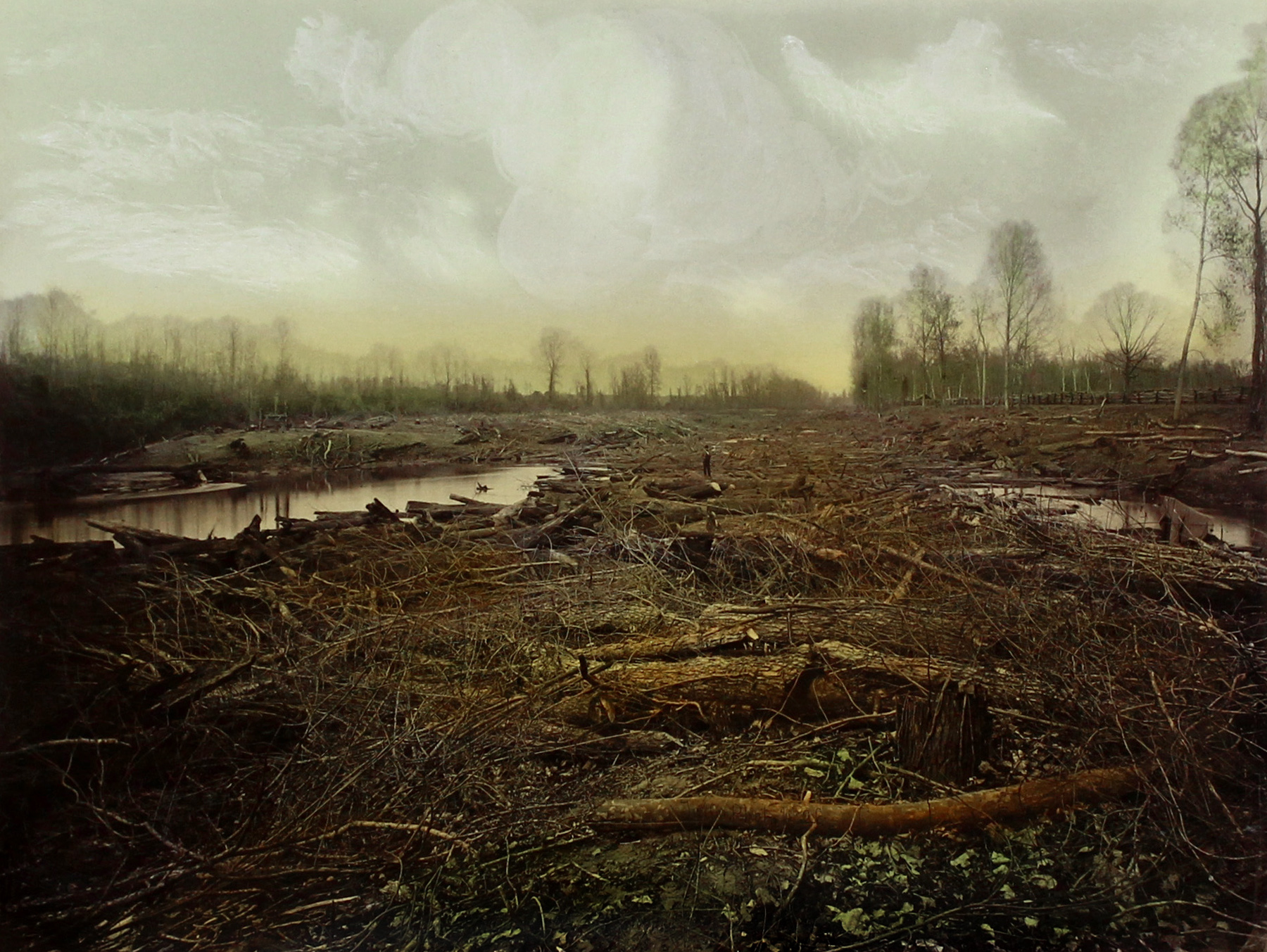
- The Second Great Raft in 1873, photographed by Robert B. Talfor
- Date: c. 12th century – 1838
- Venue: Red and Atchafalaya rivers
- Location: North America
- Type: Log jam

The Great Raft was an enormous log jam or series of "rafts" that covered the Red and Atchafalaya rivers in North America from perhaps the 12th century until its destruction in the 1830s. It was unique in North America in terms of its scale.

== Origin ==
The Great Raft possibly began forming in the 12th century or earlier. It grew from its upper end, while decaying or washing out at the lower end. By the early 1830s, it spanned more than 160 miles (260 km). At one point the raft extended for 165 miles (266 km) from Loggy Bayou to Carolina Bluffs.

The Caddo People, regional inhabitants for millennia, incorporated the Great Raft into their mythology as protector from competing tribes and recognized the contribution of associated intermittent flooding to soil fertility and agriculture.

Harrelson et al. describe the origins of the raft:

This ecosystem of entangled logs, vegetation and sediments remained in place for almost two millennia, altering the flow regime of the Red River and causing a complete change in its geomorphic character from a single channel to a series of anastomosing channels. It is believed that the initial formation of the Great Raft was triggered by catastrophic flooding as the Red River was going through some major geomorphic threshold, such as a major avulsion. The main contributors to the development of the Great Raft are believed to be the shifting geomorphic conditions in conjunction with extensive precipitation, river bank rotational slips and slab failure, rapid lateral migration, copious, rapidly growing riparian vegetation, exceeding a geomorphic threshold, a flashy hydrograph and a very heavy sediment load.

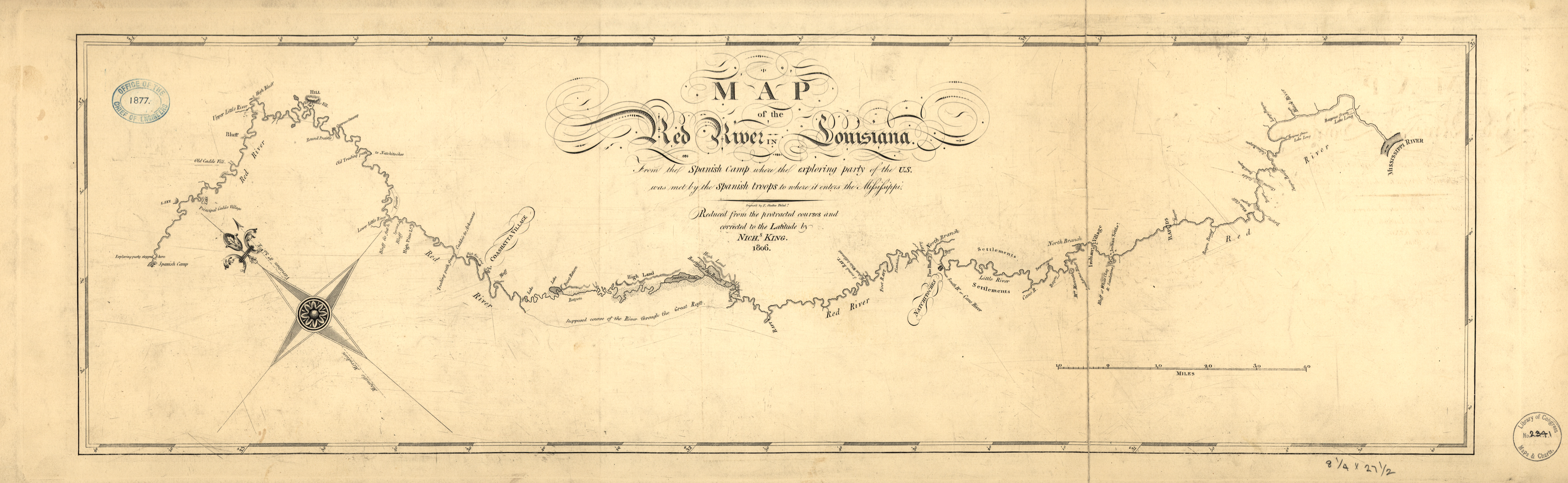
Map produced by Red River expedition of 1806 showing Great Raft, smaller rafts, Caddo settlements, and extant trails

== Characteristics ==
At the beginning of the 19th century, the raft extended from Campti, Louisiana, to around Shreveport, Louisiana. The raft blocked the mouth of Twelve Mile Bayou, impeding settlement in the area west of Shreveport. There were many smaller logjams on the Red River. According to one history of the Natchitoches section of Louisiana, "Campti is the oldest town on Red river, is a fine old town, and is named after an old Indian chief Campte. It was in remote days, a great outfitting place for North Louisiana and Arkansas territory. The great Raft reached as far down as Campti at the coming of the white men, making Natchitoches the head of navigation. The Indian traditions have it that the Raft originally reached as low down as the Falls at Alexandria."

The raft raised the banks of the river, creating bayous and several lakes. Called the Great Raft Lakes, these included Caddo and Cross Lakes, along the lower reaches of the Red River's tributaries. Ports developed along these lakes, and Jefferson, Texas, on Caddo Lake became the second-largest inland port in the United States during this period. The city thrived and was considered a major gateway to East Texas. It was important for exporting commodity crops such as cotton.

== Removal ==
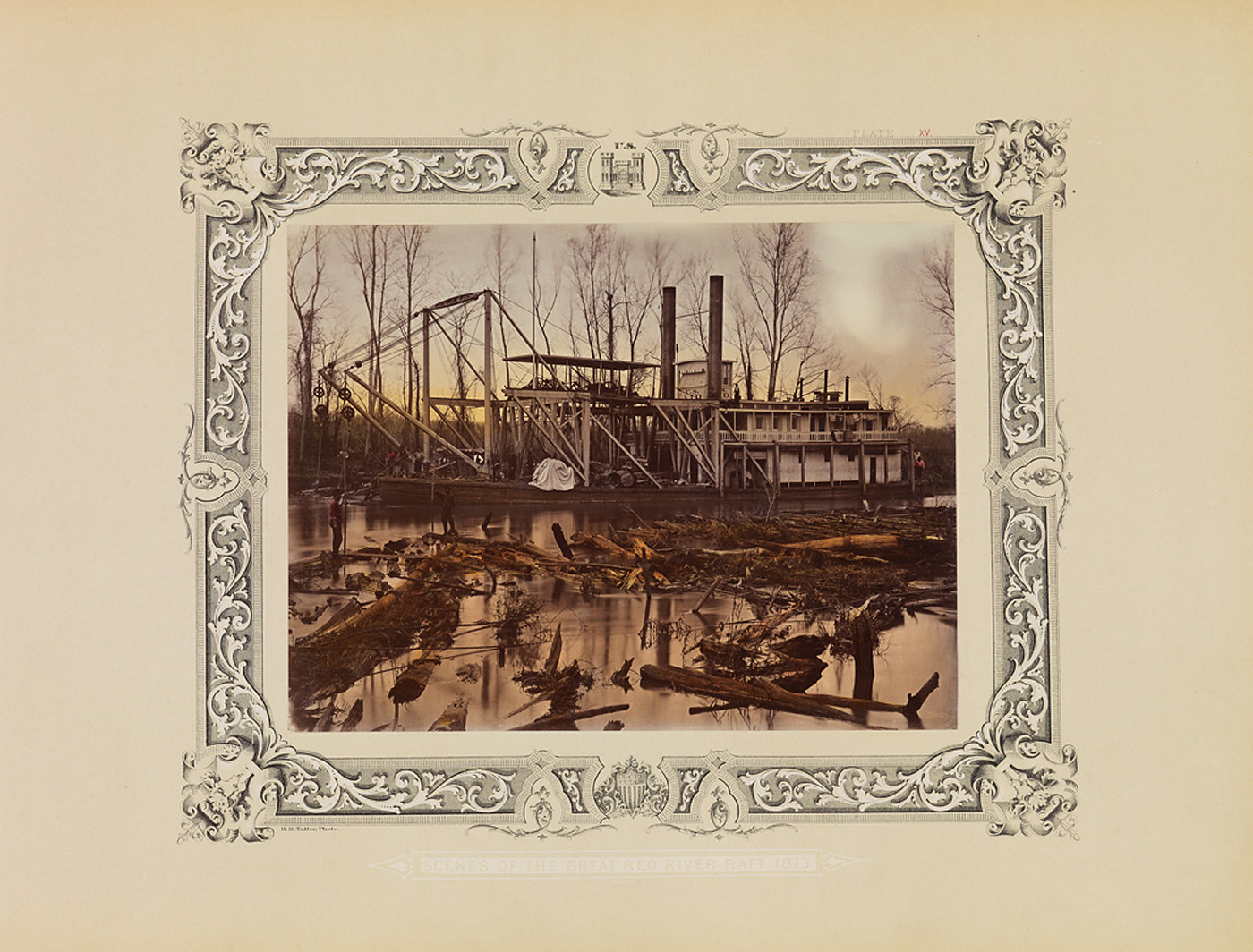
U.S. Aid, clearing logjam in the Red River, Louisiana. Plate XV of the photographic album Photographic Views of Red River Raft, 1873

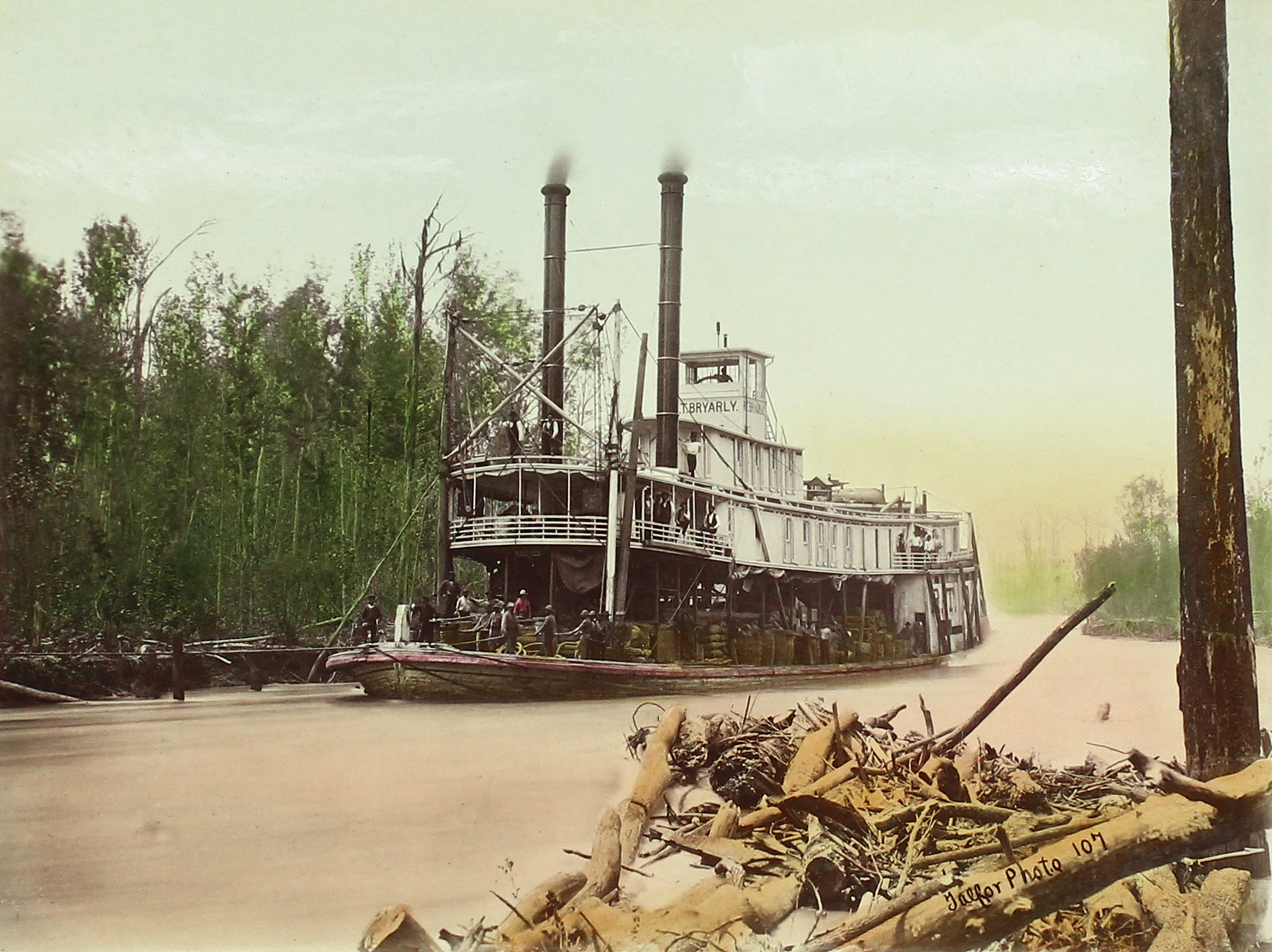
Plate CVII: Steamer Bryarly entering Red River through Sale & Murphy's Canal, 1873

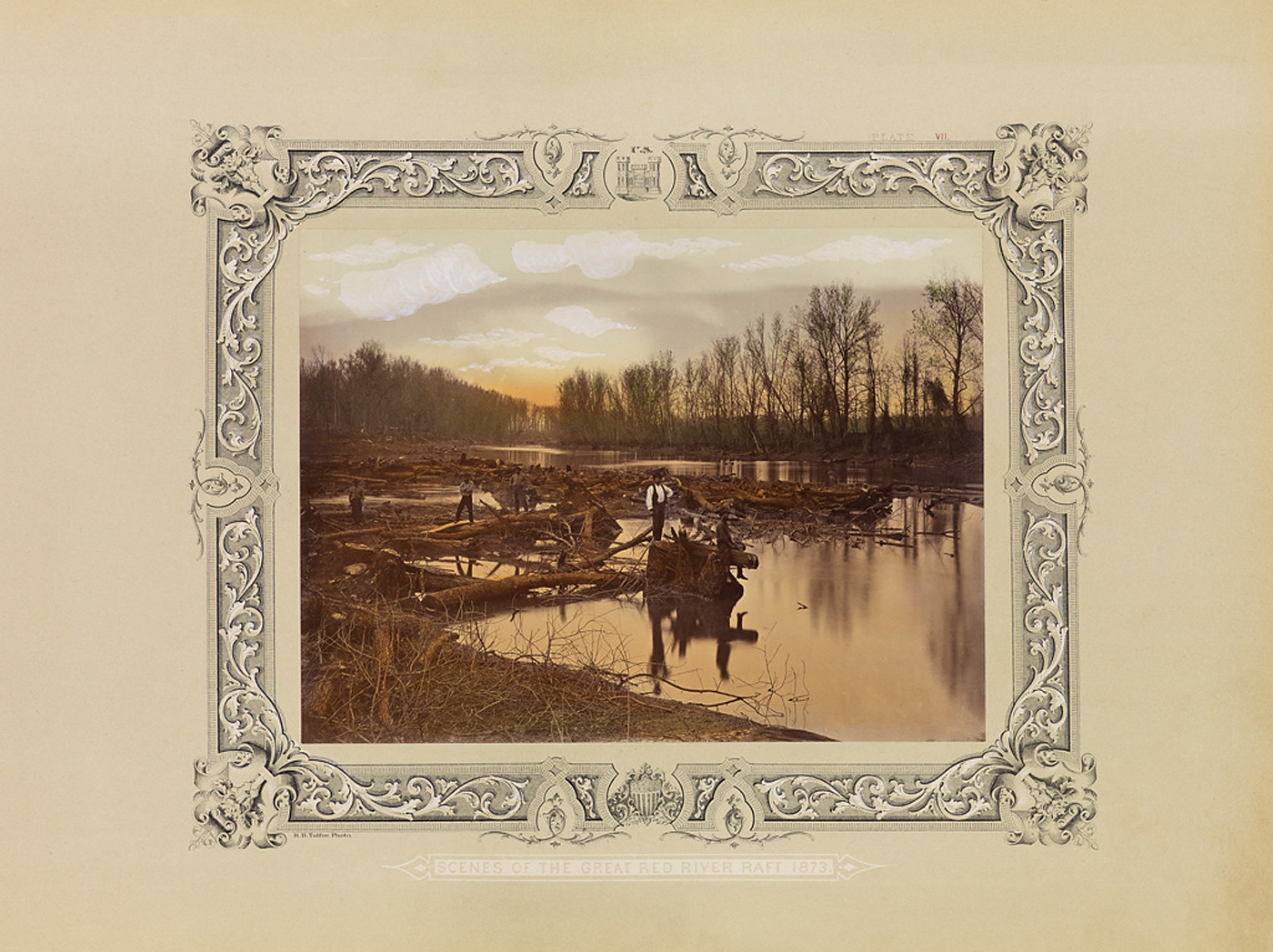
Plate VII, 1873

In 1829, the US Army Corps of Engineers hired steamboat builder and river captain Henry Miller Shreve, Superintendent of Western River Improvement, to remove the Great Raft to improve the river's navigation. Harrelson et al. describes this effort:

Captain Shreve was a steamboat entrepreneur who had successfully invested in the new steam-power technology by developing the snag boat, a steam-powered boat used for raft removal. He had already used this technology to clear navigational paths in the Ohio and Mississippi rivers in 1827. Captain Shreve arrived at the toe of the Great Raft in April 1833 with four snag boats and a force of 159 men. His group began clearing a navigational path through 115 km of the Great Raft and, finally, by the spring of 1838, a path had been cleared; however, the remnants of the Great Raft along the river banks were not cleared and the Great Raft immediately began to reform.

When Shreve began work, the raft blocked a distance from 8 miles (13 km) directly below to 17 miles (27 km) directly above Shreveport. By April 1835, Shreve had removed the raft up to the mouth of Twelvemile Bayou. He concluded this work in 1838, having removed the last impediment to navigation on the Red River. This task was continued by others until the latter part of the 19th century. For his efforts, the city of Shreveport was named after him.

== Second Great Raft ==
Although Shreve had completely removed the original raft, another soon formed farther up the river. The new foot was at the head of the old raft, near today's Belcher, Louisiana. This second raft gradually extended until it reached the Arkansas state line. This was removed in 1873 by Lieutenant Eugene Woodruff.

== Consequences ==
When the log jams were removed, the water level in Caddo Lake and others dropped dramatically, reducing their navigability for riverboats. The ports declined, and riverboats ceased to travel in Caddo Lake.

The removal of the massive log jams hastened the capture of the Mississippi River's waters in lower Louisiana by the Atchafalaya River, a major distributary emptying separately into the Gulf of Mexico. In the 20th century, to maintain the Mississippi, the US Army Corps of Engineers built the multibillion-dollar Old River Control Structure.

== See also ==
- Cane River Lake
- Los Adaes
