= Tickfaw River =

River in the United States

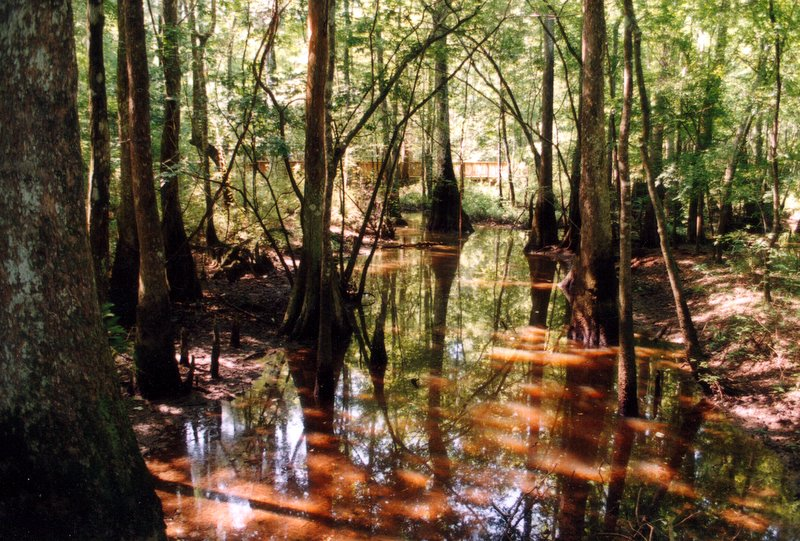
- Tickfaw River

Location
- Country: United States
- States: Mississippi; Louisiana
- County/Parish: Amite County; Tangipahoa Parish; St. Helena Parish; Livingston Parish

Physical characteristics
- Source: West Branch Tickfaw River
  - location: Amite County, Mississippi
  - coordinates: 31°03′16″N 90°37′38″W
  - elevation: 279 ft (85 m)
- Mouth: Lake Maurepas
  - location: Killian, Livingston Parish, Louisiana
  - coordinates: 30°20′36″N 90°28′27″W
  - elevation: −3 ft (−0.91 m)
- Length: 113 mi (182 km)

Basin features
- Cities: Easleyville, Louisiana; Holden, Louisiana; Killian, Louisiana
- Tributaries
  - left: Blood River; Natalbany River; Pontchatoula River

The Tickfaw River /ˈtɪkfɔː/ runs 113 miles (182 km) from Amite County in southwest Mississippi to Livingston Parish in southeast Louisiana. Its mouth opens into Lake Maurepas, which conjoins with Lake Pontchartrain.

The name Tickfaw (Tiak foha) is thought to be derived from the Choctaw phrase meaning "pine rest" or "Rest Among the Pines". More recent analysis however has determined the name to be derived from shortening and alteration of Pawticfaw meaning "place where wild animals have shed their hair". Alternate/historical names and spellings:

- Rio De San Vicente
- Rio De Tickfaw
- Rio Go Tickfoha
- Rivière Ticfoha
- Ticfaw River
- Tickfah River
- Tickfaw Creek

== See also ==
- List of rivers of Louisiana
- List of rivers of Mississippi
