= Amite =

Amite may refer to:

- Amite City, Louisiana, town in and the parish seat of Tangipahoa Parish, Louisiana, US
- Amite County, Mississippi, county in the state of Mississippi
- Amite River, tributary of Lake Maurepas in Mississippi and Louisiana in the US
