= Castor Creek (Little River tributary) =

Creek in Louisiana, USA

- Castor Creek

Location
- Country: United States
- State: Louisiana
- Parishes: Jackson; Caldwell; LaSalle; Winn

Physical characteristics
- Source
  - coordinates: 32°26′12″N 92°33′54″W
- Mouth: Little River (Louisiana)
  - location: Confluence with Dugdemona River
  - coordinates: 31°47′47″N 92°21′48″W
- Length: 103 miles (166 km)

Castor Creek or Bayou Castor is a 103-mile-long (166 km) tributary of the Little River in north-central Louisiana in the United States. Via the Little, Ouachita and Red rivers, it is part of the watershed of the Mississippi River.

Castor Creek or Bayou Castor flows from a spring in northern Jackson Parish. Caney Lake in Jackson Parish is a main tributary of Castor Creek or Bayou Castor. This waterway flows southeastwardly into Caldwell Parish, where it turns southwardly, flowing into LaSalle Parish and along its boundary with Winn Parish. It passes the towns of Olla, Louisiana (formerly known as Castor Sulphur Springs), Urania, Louisiana, Tullos, Louisiana and joins the Dugdemona River to form the Little River, about 3 miles (5 km) northeast of Georgetown. A small man-made lake is formed near the town of Olla, locally known as the "Spillway" or "The Creek". This lake was formed by earthworks built in the 1960s as a replacement to a bridge over Bayou Castor on La Hwy 124. The local Economical Development Board chose this project to provide a source of fresh water for economical development in the area. Georgia Pacific Inc utilized and pumped water via underground pipeline to its plywood manufacturing site located between Olla and Urania on LA Hwy 125.

The banks of Castor Creek or Bayou Castor just south of where LA 124 crosses the bayou was settled prior to the American Civil War. The Town of Olla, formerly known as Castor Sulfur Springs, was a steamboat port on the banks of Castor Creek or Bayou Castor at this site. The settlement had a post office, general store, hotel, spa resort, and a dry goods and cotton storage facility. Naturally occurring sulfur muds and spring water made Castor Sulfur Springs a nationally known health spa providing treatment for a variety of ailments. The curative powers of "Balance Sulfur" mud was publicized over a large part of the nation, and chronic sufferers of gout, arthritis, rheumatism, and other muscular troubles were frequent visitors

In 1891, the Houston, Central Arkansas, and Northern Railroad came to what was then northwest Catahoula Parish and bought a 200-foot-wide right-of-way over which it would construct a railroad more than a mile away from Castor Sulfur Springs. Community leaders were faced with the possibility that their town would be cut off and decided that a railroad station must be constructed for passenger and commercial services to ensure the survival of Castor Sulfur Springs. Dr. Frank Mills, with the assistance of Mr. J.D. Adams, set aside 40 acres of land for a station and town-site. This transaction was recorded on February 9, 1891. When the new site was chosen and incorporation paperwork was submitted naming the new community "New Castor Sulfur Springs", their request was denied. The legislature was not accepting new municipalities named in reference to springs, rivers, bayous, or creeks to avoid duplication and confusion. The new town would need to be renamed, and many suggestions were made. New Lebanon was considered as well as many Greek and Biblical names, which were very popular at the time. After much debate, it was decided that the new community should be named for Olla Mills, daughter of Dr. Frank Mills and sister to Judge W.H. Mills, who were residents of Castor Sulfur Springs for many years. Ms. Mills was an accomplished, attractive, and popular young lady who was dramatically inclined and took a predominant part in all constructive community activities. Because of her background in education and her gift for expression, Miss Mills had served with distinction as the head of the Olla Military Institute's English department. Miss Olla Mills, who later became Mrs. CC Young, died in 1901 and is buried in the Olla Cemetery. At Grayson, LA, the creek has a mean annual discharge of 242 cubic feet per second.

== Variant names and spellings ==
According to the Geographic Names Information System, Castor Creek has also been known historically as:

- Castor Creek
- Bayou Castor
- Castor Bayou
- Castor River
- The Creek
- The Spillway

== See also ==
- List of Louisiana rivers
