= Sam Houston Jones State Park =

Louisiana state park

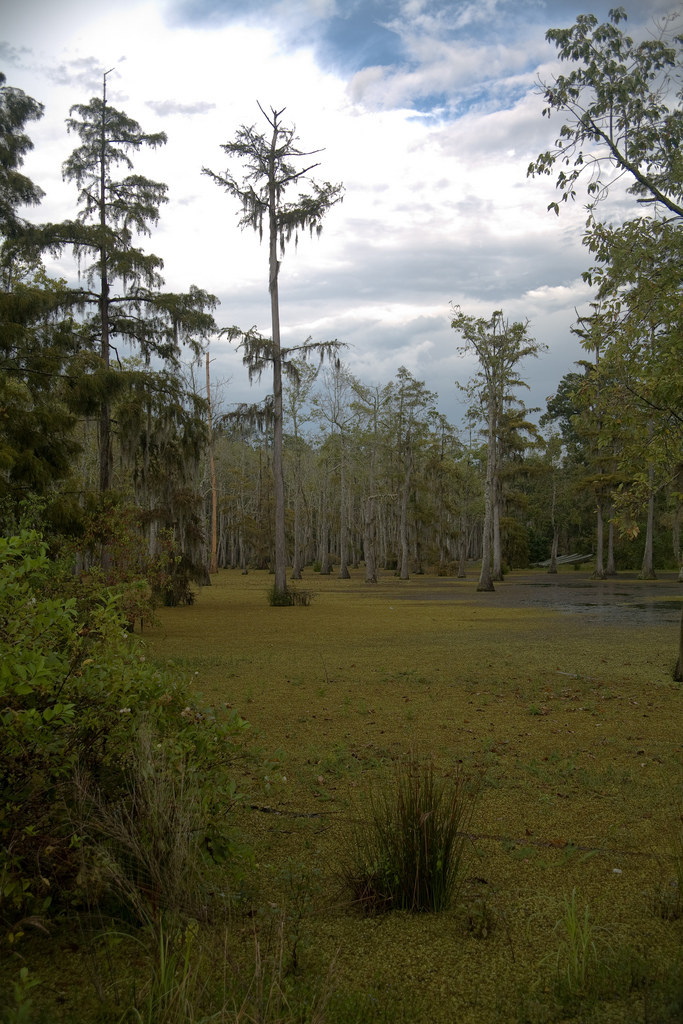
- A swamp in Sam Houston Jones State Park

- Location within Louisiana
- Location: Calcasieu Parish, Louisiana, United States of America
- Coordinates: 30°18′00″N 93°15′22″W
- Area: 1,087 acres (4.40 km^{2})
- Established: 1944
- Visitors: 4,873 (in 2022)
- Governing body: Louisiana Office of State Parks
- Website: Official website

Sam Houston Jones State Park is a park near the city of Lake Charles, Calcasieu Parish, in southwestern Louisiana (USA), located where the Houston River joins the Calcasieu River and Indian Bayou. It consists of 1,087 acres (440 ha) of woodlands, lakes and rivers. Prominent in the park are many bald cypress trees. Tree-filled lagoons and a mixed pine and hardwood forest combine to create a unique natural environment. The area hosts an abundance of wildlife, including deer, squirrels, bobcats, rabbits, alligators, otters, nutria rats, raccoons, foxes and diverse bird life. Ducks and geese are usually found swimming in the ponds.

Originally named for Sam Houston, the Texas folk hero who traveled extensively in the western reaches of Louisiana, its current name is in honor of the former Louisiana governor Sam Houston Jones, who was instrumental in setting aside this tract of land for the public to enjoy. Facilities include campsites, cabins, a boat launch, rental boats, a scenic picnic area with pavilions, a playground and restrooms.

The site is located in the Central Migratory Flyway and just north of the most productive birding region in Louisiana. In the spring and fall, migratory patterns bring nearly 200 bird species within 30 miles (50 km) of the park site.

The numerous waterways in this area make water sports a natural highlight at the park. Two boat launches are conveniently located on the West Fork of the Calcasieu River, providing access to the Gulf of Mexico, only a few miles away. Rental boats are available those who simply wish to take in the serene beauty of the park's ponds or for fishing.

The three hiking trails winding through this beautiful park make strolling or serious hiking, pleasurable. Hikers may visit the old stagecoach road to explore the park and the banks of the various tributaries to the Calcasieu River.

Hours of Operation are 6 a.m. to 9 p.m., Sunday to Thursday. All park sites close at 10 p.m. on Friday, on Saturdays and days preceding holidays.
