= Dugdemona River =

Waterway in Louisiana, USA

- Dugdemona River

Location
- Country: United States
- State: Louisiana
- Parishes: Lincoln; Bienville; Jackson; Winn; Grant

Physical characteristics
- Source
  - location: West of Simsboro
  - coordinates: 32°32′18″N 92°49′53″W
- Mouth: Confluence with Castor Creek to form Little River
  - coordinates: 31°47′46″N 92°21′46″W
- Length: 129 miles (208 km)

The Dugdemona River (pronounced dug-duh-mona) is a 129-mile-long (208 km) tributary of the Little River in north-central Louisiana in the United States. Via the Little, Ouachita and Red rivers, it is part of the watershed of the Mississippi River.

The Dugdemona River rises west of Simsboro in western Lincoln Parish, and flows generally southeastwardly through Bienville, Jackson, Winn and Grant parishes, through a portion of the Kisatchie National Forest. It joins Castor Creek to form the Little River about 3 miles (4.8 km) northeast of Georgetown. A short tributary known as the Little Dugdemona River flows southwestwardly through Jackson and Bienville parishes. At Joyce, LA, the river has a mean annual discharge of 835 cubic feet per second.

== Variant names and spellings ==
According to the Geographic Names Information System, the Dugdemona River has also been known historically as:

- Bugdemon River
- Degdemoa Creek
- Dogdamane River
- Dogdemane River
- Dogdimona River
- Dougdiamonia Bayou
- Duagdemonai Bayou
- Ducdumani Creek
- Duedumani Creek
- Dug de Mona Bayou
- Dug de Mona River
- Dugdamoney River
- Dugdamoni River
- Dugdamonia Bayou
- Dugdamonia Creek
- Dugdamony River
- Dugdemona Bayou
- Dugdemoni Creek
- Dugdimona River
- Dugdimoni Bayou
- Dugdymonia Creek
- Dugmonia Bayou
- Dugdemonia River
- Little River

== See also ==
- List of Louisiana rivers
