= Bayou Wikoff =

Waterway in southwestern Louisiana, USA

- Bayou Wikoff
- Location within Louisiana

Location
- Country: United States
- State: Louisiana
- Parishes: St. Landry; Acadia

Physical characteristics
- Source
  - location: St. Landry Parish
  - coordinates: 30°26′40″N 92°08′50″W
- Mouth: Bayou Plaquemine Brulee
  - coordinates: 30°15′15″N 92°22′01″W
- Length: 30 miles (48 km)

Basin features
- River system: Mermentau River
- Cities: Church Point

Bayou Wikoff is a 30-mile-long (48 km) bayou in southern Louisiana in the United States. It is named after William Wikoff, a large property owner in the area during the 1790s.

Another early settler was William Gilchrist who purchased land around the site of the Attakapas village on Bayou Wikoff. Dotrif Andrus, another early landowner, testified before a board of inquiry in 1814 that "fourteen or fifteen years ago, the Indians abandoned this land, where they had their village, since then it has been uninhabited and uncultivated .... The Indian who sold (the land to) Gilchrist was an Indian of note, but not the chief of the village."

== See also ==
- List of rivers in Louisiana
