= Little River (Louisiana) =

Tributary of Ouachita River in Louisiana, USA

- Little River

Location
- Country: United States
- State: Louisiana
- Parishes: Grant; LaSalle; Rapides; Catahoula

Physical characteristics
- Source: Confluence of Dugdemona River and Castor Creek
  - location: Near Georgetown, Louisiana
  - coordinates: 31°47′48″N 92°21′46″W
- Mouth: Ouachita River
  - location: Jonesville
  - coordinates: 31°37′38″N 91°48′33″W
- Length: 96 miles (154 km)

Basin features
- Cities: Jonesville

The Little River is a 96-mile-long (154 km) tributary of the Ouachita (Black) River in central Louisiana in the United States. Via the Ouachita and Red rivers, it is part of the watershed of the Mississippi River. According to the Geographic Names Information System, the Little River has also been known historically as "Bayou Des Nacitoches," "Catahoula Bayou," and "Catahoula River."

The Little River is formed about 3 miles (5 km) northeast of Georgetown by the confluence of the Dugdemona River and Castor Creek. It flows initially southeastwardly along the boundaries of Grant, LaSalle, and Rapides parishes, before turning east-northeastwardly into LaSalle Parish through Catahoula Lake, which is bordered by the Catahoula National Wildlife Refuge. In the twentieth century the waste from the oil production and exploration damaged the riparian lands in LaSalle Parish. After passing through the lake, the Little River continues east-northeastwardly into Catahoula Parish, where it joins the Ouachita River from the west at Jonesville, just downstream of the mouth of the Tensas River. (Below the mouth of the Tensas, the Ouachita River is sometimes known as the "Black River.") The Little River, as measured at the USGS station at Rochelle, LA, has a mean annual discharge of 2,260 cubic feet per second.

The state government of Louisiana has designated the uppermost 53 miles (85 km) of the Little River (above Catahoula Lake) as a "Natural and Scenic River." This portion of the river flows through a mixed oak-gum bottomland forest interspersed with stands of bald cypress. The Kisatchie Wold is a natural ridge which borders the north side of the stream. Sixty prehistoric Native American archaeological sites have been identified along this stretch of the river.

== See also ==
- List of Louisiana rivers
