= Log jam =

Accumulation of large wood in a stream or river, preventing movement downstream

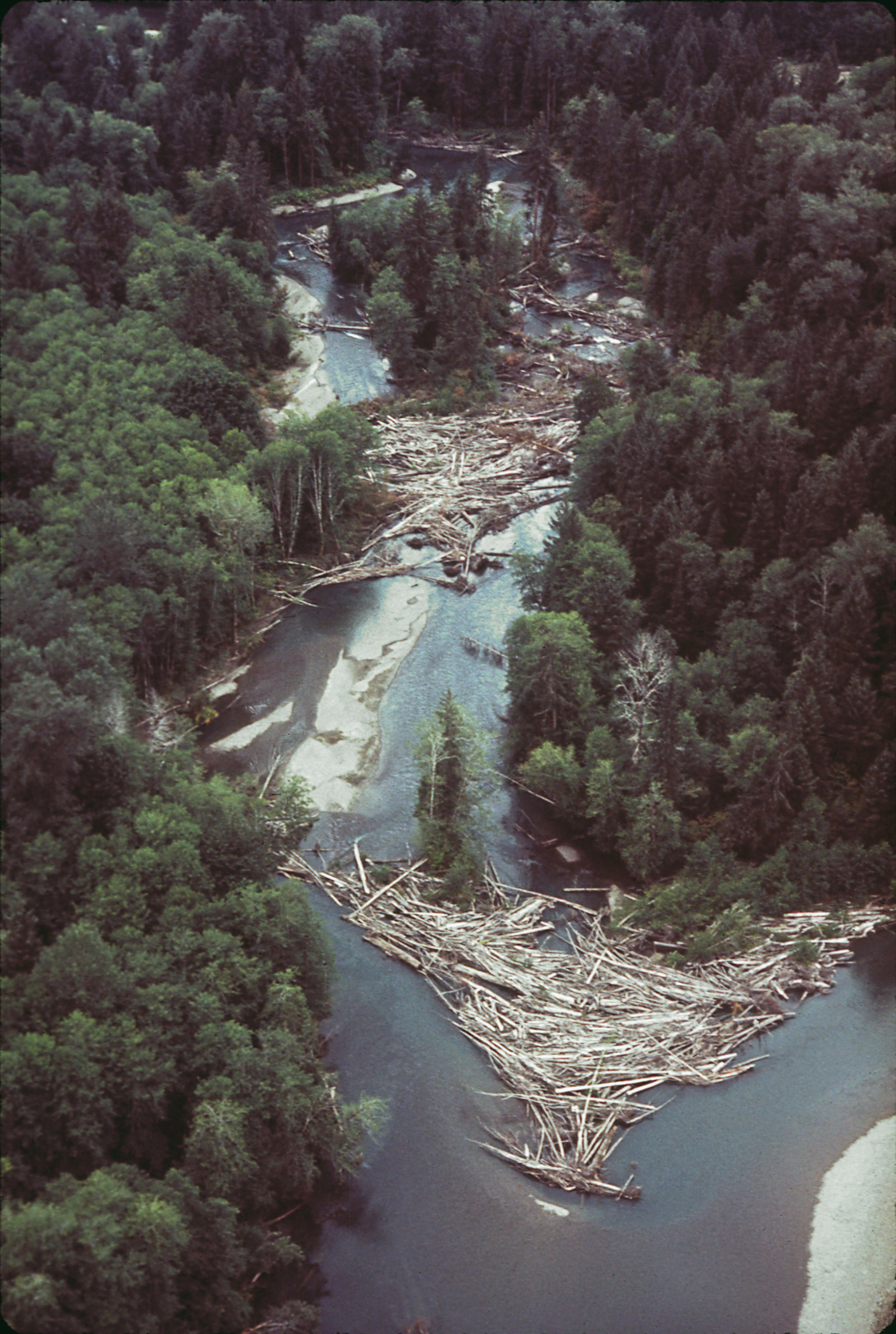
Log jam on the Quinault River, Washington, United States

A log jam is a naturally occurring phenomenon characterized by a dense accumulation of tree trunks and pieces of large wood across a vast section of a river, stream, or lake. ("Large wood" is commonly defined to be pieces of wood more than 10 cm (4 in) in diameter and more than 1 m (3 ft 3 in) long.) Log jams in rivers and streams often span the entirety of the water's surface from bank to bank. Log jams form when trees floating in the water become entangled with other trees floating in the water or become snagged on rocks, large woody debris, or other objects anchored underwater. They can build up slowly over months or years, or they can happen instantaneously when large numbers of trees are swept into the water after natural disasters. A notable example caused by a natural disaster is the log jam that occurred in Spirit Lake following a landslide triggered by the eruption of Mount St. Helens. Unless they are dismantled by natural causes or humans, log jams can grow quickly, as more wood arriving from upstream becomes entangled in the mass. Log jams can persist for many decades, as is the case with the log jam in Spirit Lake.

Historically in North America, large natural "log rafts" were common across the continent prior to European settlement. The most famous natural wood raft is the Great Raft on the Red River in Louisiana, which prior to its removal in the 1830s affected between 390 and 480 km (240–300 mi) of the main channel. It has been suggested that such extensive log rafts may have been common in Europe in prehistory. Currently, the largest known log jam is over 6700 tonnes in the Mackenzie River in Canada's Northwest Territories and covers an area of 112,600 m². Logjams in the Mackenzie River Delata collectively contain more than 400,000 caches of wood and store 3.4 million tons of carbon, equivalent to a year's emissions from 2.5 million cars.

Log jams are not to be confused with man-made timber rafts created by loggers or the intentional release of large masses of trees into the water during a log drive to a sawmill.

== Effects on river geomorphology ==
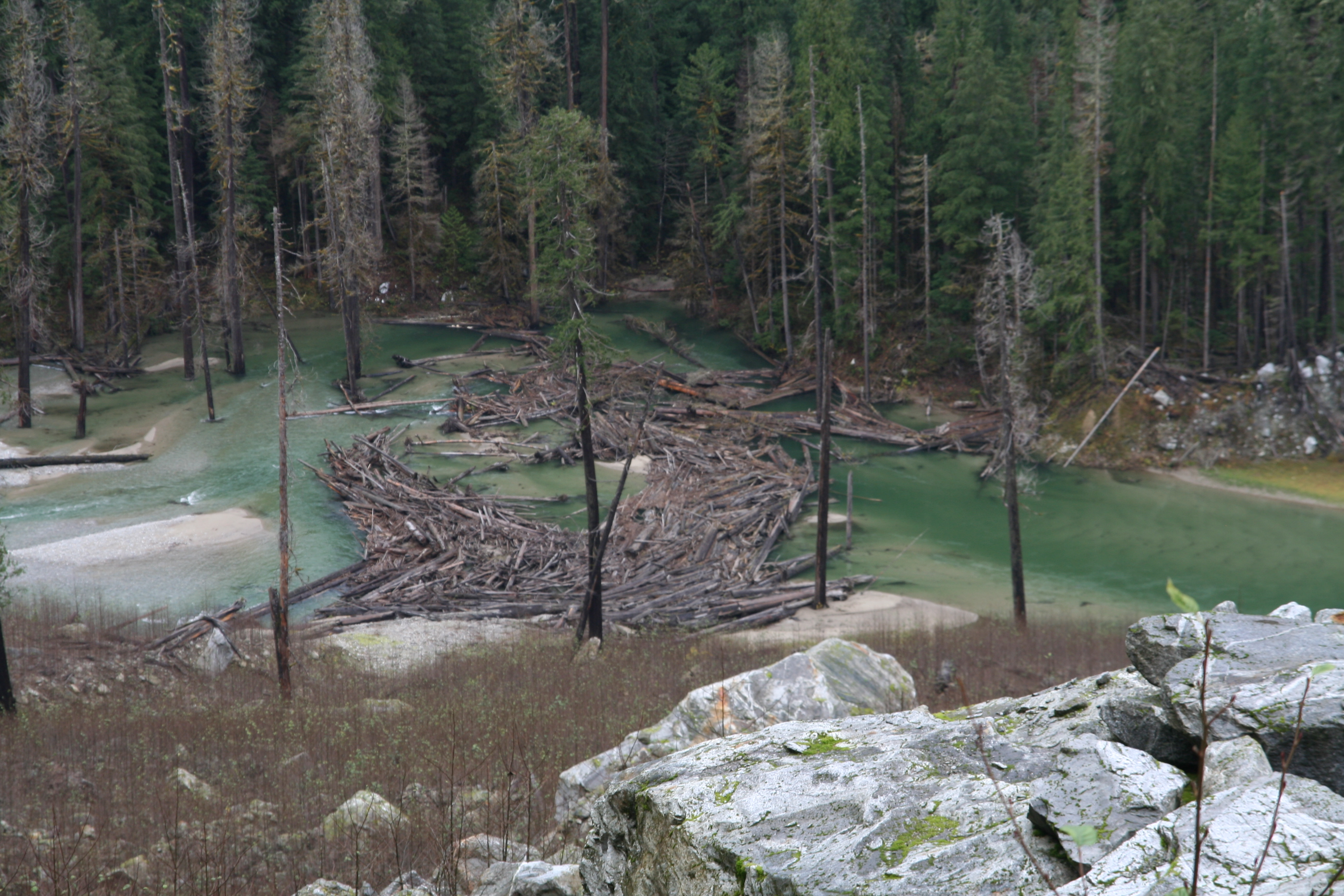
Log jam in Goodell Creek, Washington

Log jams alter flow hydraulics by diverting flow towards the bed or banks, increasing flow resistance and creating upstream pools, diverting flow onto the floodplain and damming the channel, causing water to spill over the structure. These altered channel hydraulics change local patterns of erosion and deposition, which can create greater variety in local geomorphology and thus create provision and variety of habitat for instream living organisms. The formation of a log jam against one bank typically concentrates flow in the wood-free portion of the channel, increasing velocity through this section and promoting scour of the riverbed. The formation of channel-spanning log jams can lead to the formation of an upstream pool, water spilling over the structure generating a "plunge pool" immediately downstream.

The hydraulic and geomorphological effects of log jams are highly dependent on the slope of the river (and thus the potential power of the stream); in steep channels, log jams tend to form channel-spanning steplike structures with an associated downstream scour pool, whereas in large lowland rivers with low slopes, log jams tend to be partial structures primarily acting to deflect flow with minimal geomorphological change.

== Effects on ecology ==
Log jams provide important fish habitat. The pools created and sediment deposited by formation of log jams create prime spawning grounds for many species of salmon. These pools also provide refuge for fish during low water levels when other parts of a stream may be nearly dry. Log jams can provide refuge, as velocity shelters, during high-flow periods.

It has been suggested that log jams are an aspect of trees acting as ecosystem engineers to alter river habitats to promote tree growth. In dynamic braided rivers, such as the Tagliamento River in Italy, where the dominant tree species is the black poplar, fallen trees form log jams when they are deposited on bars; fine sediment is deposited around these log jams, and sprouting seedlings are able to stabilise braid bars and promote the formation of stable islands in the river. These stable islands are then prime areas for establishment of seedlings and further vegetation growth, which in turn can eventually provide more fallen trees to the river and thus form more log jams.

In large rivers in the Pacific Northwest of the United States, it has been shown there is a lifecycle of tree growth and river migration, with large trees falling into the channel as banks erode, then staying in place and acting as focal points for log jam formation. These log jams act as hard points, resisting further erosion and channel migration. The areas of floodplain behind these log jams then become stable enough for more large trees to grow, which can in turn become potential log jam anchor points in the future.

== Metaphorical usage ==
"Logjam" or "log jam" can be used metaphorically to mean 'deadlock' or 'impasse'. It can be used either more literally, to mean a physical impasse, or more metaphorically, to mean an impasse in a process due to differing opinions, legal or technical issues, etc. Here are two example sentences:

- "The presence of an ambulance on the side of the highway created a logjam of rubberneckers who just had to have a look." (more literal).
- "He was called in to try to break the logjam in the negotiations." (more metaphorical).

== See also ==
- Beaver dam, a wooden dam created by beavers
- Great Raft
- River morphology
- Stream restoration
- 1886 St. Croix River log jam
