= Antoine Creek =

Stream in Natchitoches Parish, Louisiana, U.S.

Coordinates: 32.07433°N 93.14739°W

Antoine Creek is a stream in Natchitoches Parish, Louisiana, in the United States.

== History ==
Antoine Creek was named for Antoine Grillette, a pioneer settler.

== See also ==
- List of rivers of Louisiana
