= Comite Creek =

Stream in the southern U.S.

Coordinates: 30.9494562°N 91.0620873°W

Comite Creek is a stream in the U.S. states of Louisiana and Mississippi. It is a tributary to the Comite River.

The origin of the name "Comite Creek" is obscure. Comite may be a corruption of the name of Amite as in Amite River. Variant names are "Comite River" and "East Fork Comite River".
