= Black Bayou =

Coordinates: 32.70403°N 93.91463°W

Location
- Country: United States

Physical characteristics
- Source
  - location: Texas
- Discharge
  - location: Gilliam, LA
  - average: 362 cu/ft. per sec.

Black Bayou is a 66.6-mile-long (107.2 km) river in Texas and Louisiana. It is a tributary of Twelvemile Bayou, which feeds Cross Bayou and consequently the Red River and the Mississippi River. It rises in Cass County, Texas, 7 miles (11 km) north of Atlanta, and flows south past Atlanta, then southeast into Caddo Parish, Louisiana. It continues southeast until reaching the Red River floodplain, then curves south and southwest to its confluence with the outlet of Caddo Lake, where Twelvemile Bayou is formed.

== See also ==
- List of rivers of Louisiana
- List of rivers of Texas
