= Comite River =

River in the United States of America

- Native name: French: Rivière Comité

Location
- Country: United States
- State: Louisiana
- Parishes: East Feliciana; East Baton Rouge

Physical characteristics
- Source: Confluence of Opossum Bayou and Comite Creek
  - coordinates: 30°53′59″N 91°03′37″W
- Mouth: Amite River
  - location: West of Denham Springs, Louisiana
  - coordinates: 30°27′55″N 90°59′21″W
- Length: 56.1 miles (90.3 km)
- Basin size: 348 square miles (900 km^{2})

The Comite River /ˈkoʊ.mit/ (French: Rivière Comité) is a right-bank tributary of the Amite River, with a confluence near the city of Denham Springs, east of Baton Rouge, Louisiana. The river is 56.1 miles (90.3 km) long. Its drainage basin comprises about 348 square miles (900 km^{2}), and includes portions of Wilkinson and Amite Counties in Mississippi, and East Feliciana and East Baton Rouge Parishes in Louisiana. The river's source lies in the hills of the East and West Feliciana Parishes, and empties into the Amite River just north of U.S. Route 190 (Florida Blvd) near the eastern boundary of Baton Rouge.

== Flooding ==
Following heavy rainfall, the water drains into the river. During flood events, homes in outlying areas east of Baton Rouge can become flooded. The flood of record saw floodwaters cover Greenwell Springs Road.

== See also ==
- 2016 Louisiana floods
