= Catahoula Lake =

Lake in Louisiana, United States

- Location within Louisiana Location within the United States

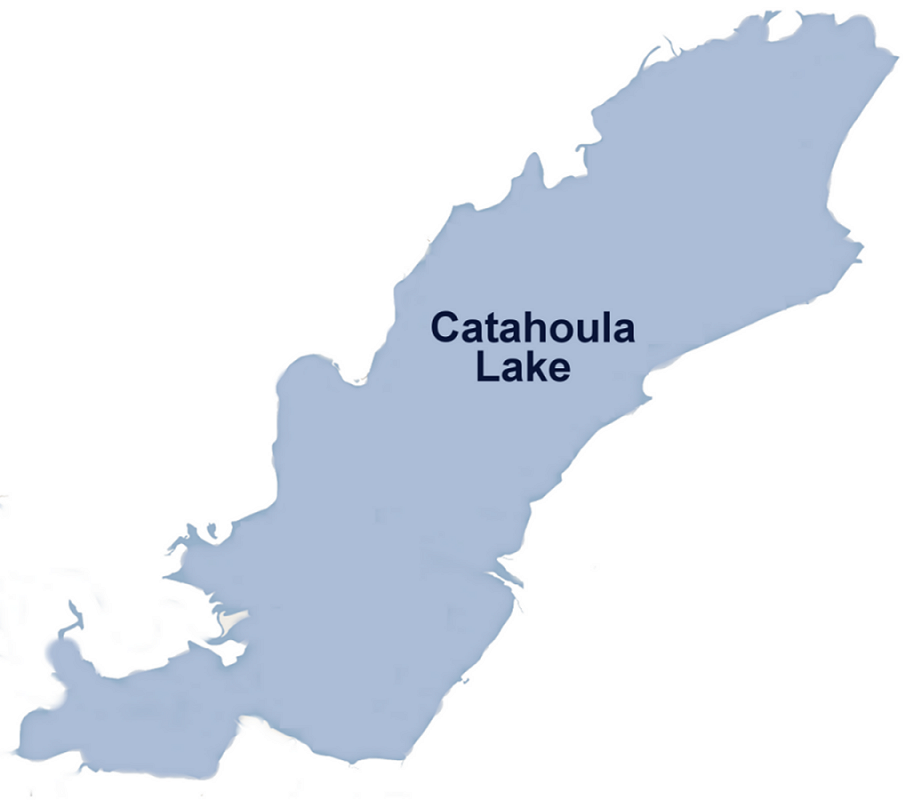
- Location: LaSalle / Rapides parishes, Louisiana, United States
- Coordinates: 31°30′45″N 092°06′26″W
- Basin countries: United States
- Surface area: 30,000 acres (12,000 ha)

Ramsar Wetland
- Designated: 18 June 1991
- Reference no.: 523

Catahoula Lake (French: Lac Catahoula) is a large freshwater lake located in LaSalle Parish and Rapides Parish of central Louisiana, United States.

Catahoula Lake is the largest natural freshwater lake in the state covering just over 46 square miles (120 km^{2}). It is owned by the State of Louisiana and managed by the U.S. Army Corps of Engineers, the U.S. Fish and Wildlife Service, and the Louisiana Department of Wildlife and Fisheries.

Catahoula is a shallow, and poorly drained wetland supported by the Little River and several creeks. It was drained by the Old River, French Fork and a number of bayous until several flood control projects changed the lake's drainage characteristics.

It is known as the largest moist soil unit in North America and supports a variety of waterfowl including geese, duck, and wading birds and is a recreational area for hunting, fishing, hiking, sight seeing, and bird watching. Access to the lake is limited on the western shores due to private and corporate fencing.

== Controversy ==
There has been controversy over the classification of Catahoula Lake. The area is considered a "salt lake" that was created when seismic activity caused the land to sink. The area has dry and wet periodic cycles, flooding annually from the Little, Red, Ouachita (Black) River, and Mississippi River. To advance the wildlife ecosystem, including ducks, control structures were built to enhance this annual flooding. Every year after June, most of the water is drained. This action facilitates plant growth, especially of Chufa, also called yellow nutsedge. A lawsuit and district court ruling determined that the area is not a lake but a river. The ramifications of this ruling, which has been appealed to The Third Circuit Court of Appeals, are that, as a river, it may not be managed for public use.
