= Amite River =

River in the United States of America

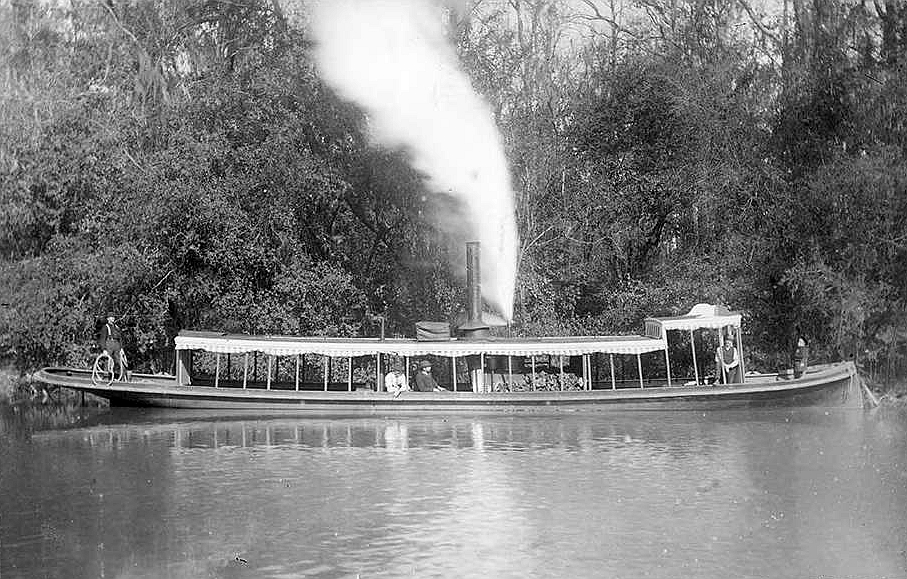
- An excursion steamer on the Amite River, ca. 1895
- Etymology: French amitié ("friendship"), or Choctaw himmita ("young")

Location
- Country: United States
- States: Mississippi; Louisiana
- Counties: Lincoln; Amite
- Parishes: East Feliciana; St. Helena; East Baton Rouge; Ascension; Livingston

Physical characteristics
- Source: West Fork Amite River
  - location: Amite County, Mississippi
  - coordinates: 31°19′19″N 90°43′40″W
- 2nd source: East Fork Amite River
  - location: Lincoln County, Mississippi
  - coordinates: 31°26′05″N 90°37′12″W
- Source confluence
  - location: St. Helena Parish and East Feliciana Parish, Louisiana
  - coordinates: 30°59′38″N 90°50′06″W
- Mouth: Lake Maurepas
  - location: Livingston Parish, Louisiana
  - coordinates: 30°17′53″N 90°33′37″W
- Length: 117 mi (188 km)

Basin features
- Cities: Denham Springs, Louisiana; Whitehall, Livingston Parish, Louisiana
- Tributaries
  - right: Comite River, Bayou Manchac

The Amite River /ˈeɪ.mit/ (French: Rivière Amite) is a tributary of Lake Maurepas in Mississippi and Louisiana in the United States. It is about 117 miles (188 km) long. It starts as two forks in southwestern Mississippi and flows south through Louisiana, passing Greater Baton Rouge, to Lake Maurepas. The lower 37 miles (59.5 km) of the river is navigable. A portion of the river is diverted via the Petite Amite River and Amite Diversion Canal to the Blind River, which also flows to Lake Maurepas.

== Name ==
Amite could be a name derived from the Choctaw language meaning "young", although folk etymology holds it to be a corruption of the French amitié meaning "friendship".

== Fishing ==
A 3.09-kilogram (6.8 lb) white bass (Morone chrysops) was caught on August 27, 2010, on the Amite River in Louisiana by angler Corey Crochet, tying an International Game Fish Association world record.

== Gallery ==
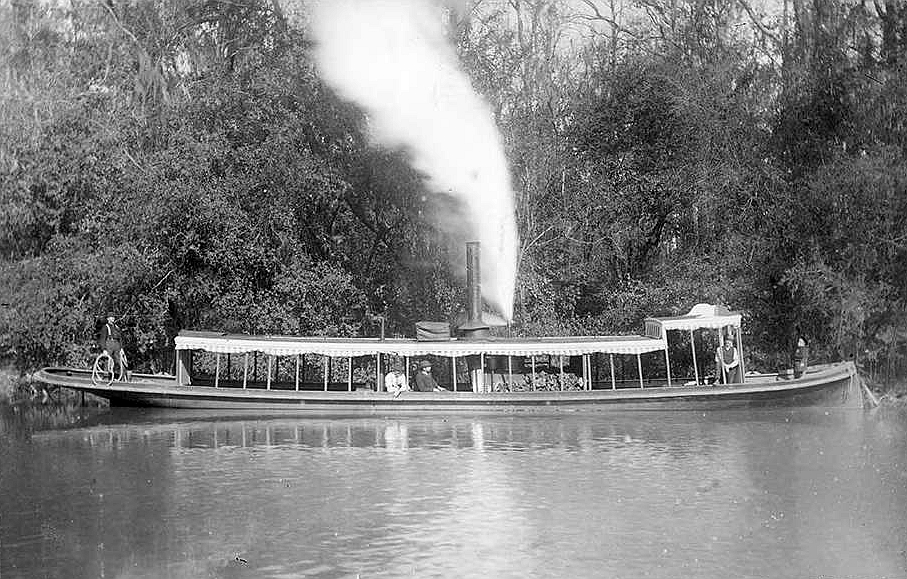
An excursion steamer on the Amite River, c. 1895

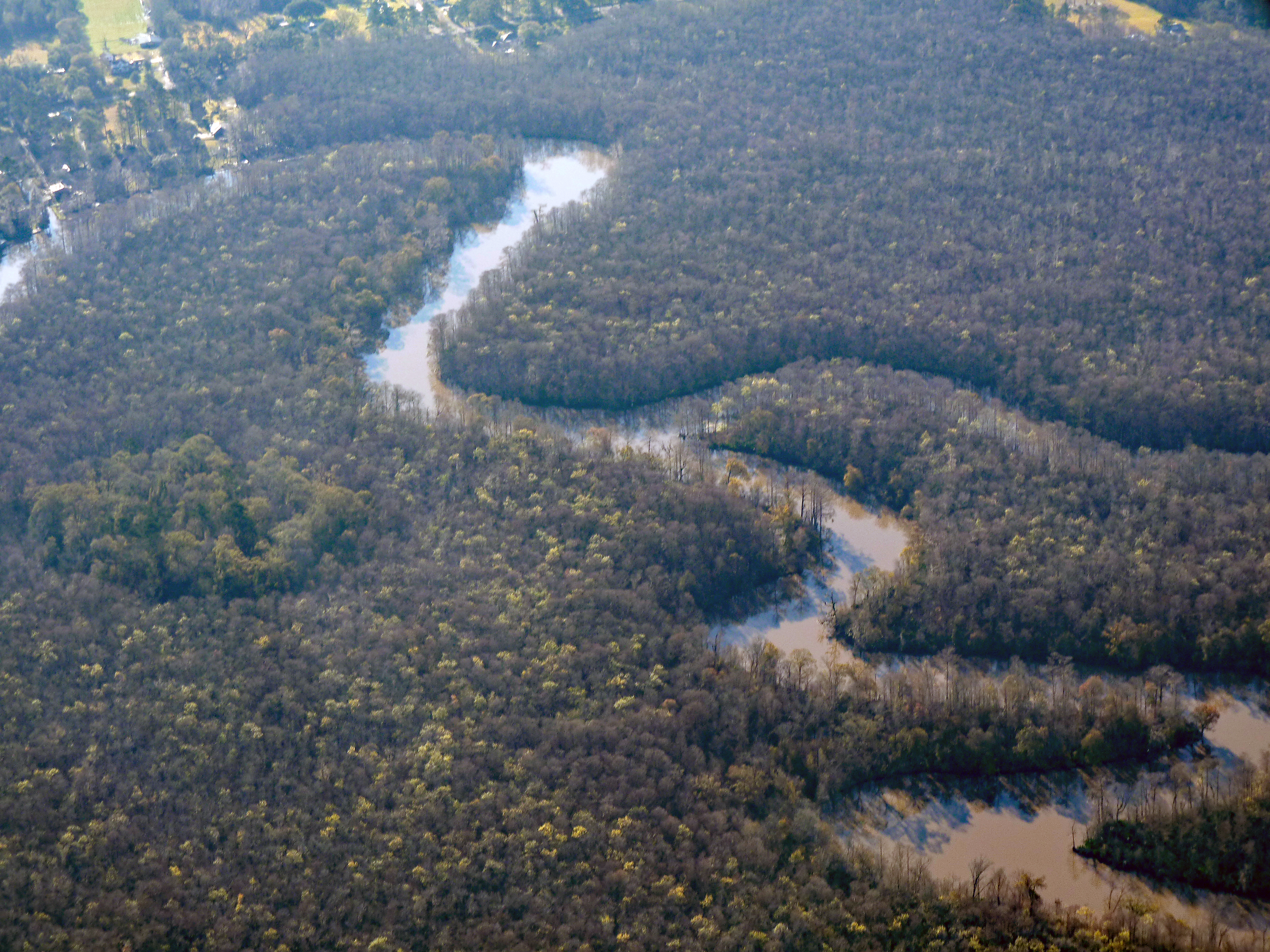
Aerial view, 2016

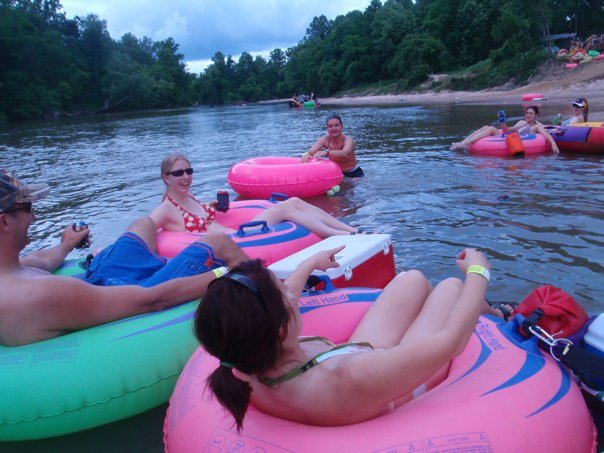
Riding inner tubes on the river

== See also ==
- 2016 Louisiana floods
- List of Louisiana rivers
- List of rivers of Mississippi
