= Jamestown, Louisiana =

- Village
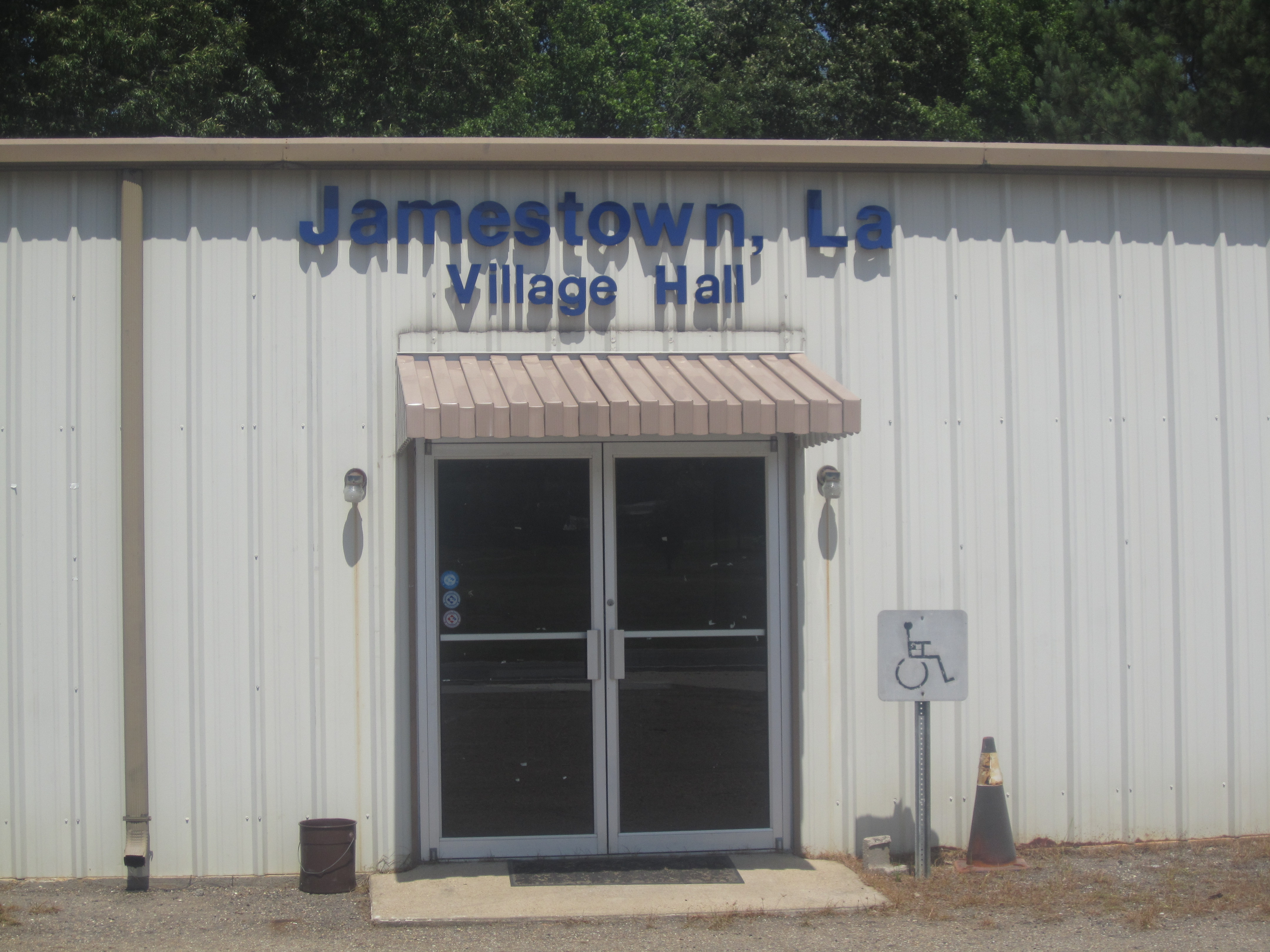
- Jamestown Village Hall

- Location of Jamestown in Bienville Parish, Louisiana.

- Location of Louisiana in the United States
- Coordinates: 32°20′23″N 93°12′23″W
- Country: United States
- State: Louisiana
- Parish: Bienville

Area
  - Total: 1.77 sq mi (4.59 km^{2})
  - Land: 1.75 sq mi (4.53 km^{2})
  - Water: 0.019 sq mi (0.05 km^{2})
- Elevation: 230 ft (70 m)

Population (2020)
  - Total: 100
  - Density: 57.1/sq mi (22.05/km^{2})
- Time zone: UTC-6 (CST)
  - Summer (DST): UTC-5 (CDT)
- Area code: 318
- FIPS code: 22-37935
- GNIS feature ID: 2407482

Jamestown is a village in Bienville Parish, Louisiana, United States. As of the 2020 census, Jamestown had a population of 100.

Jamestown is 4 mi (6 km) west of Kepler Lake.

== Geography ==
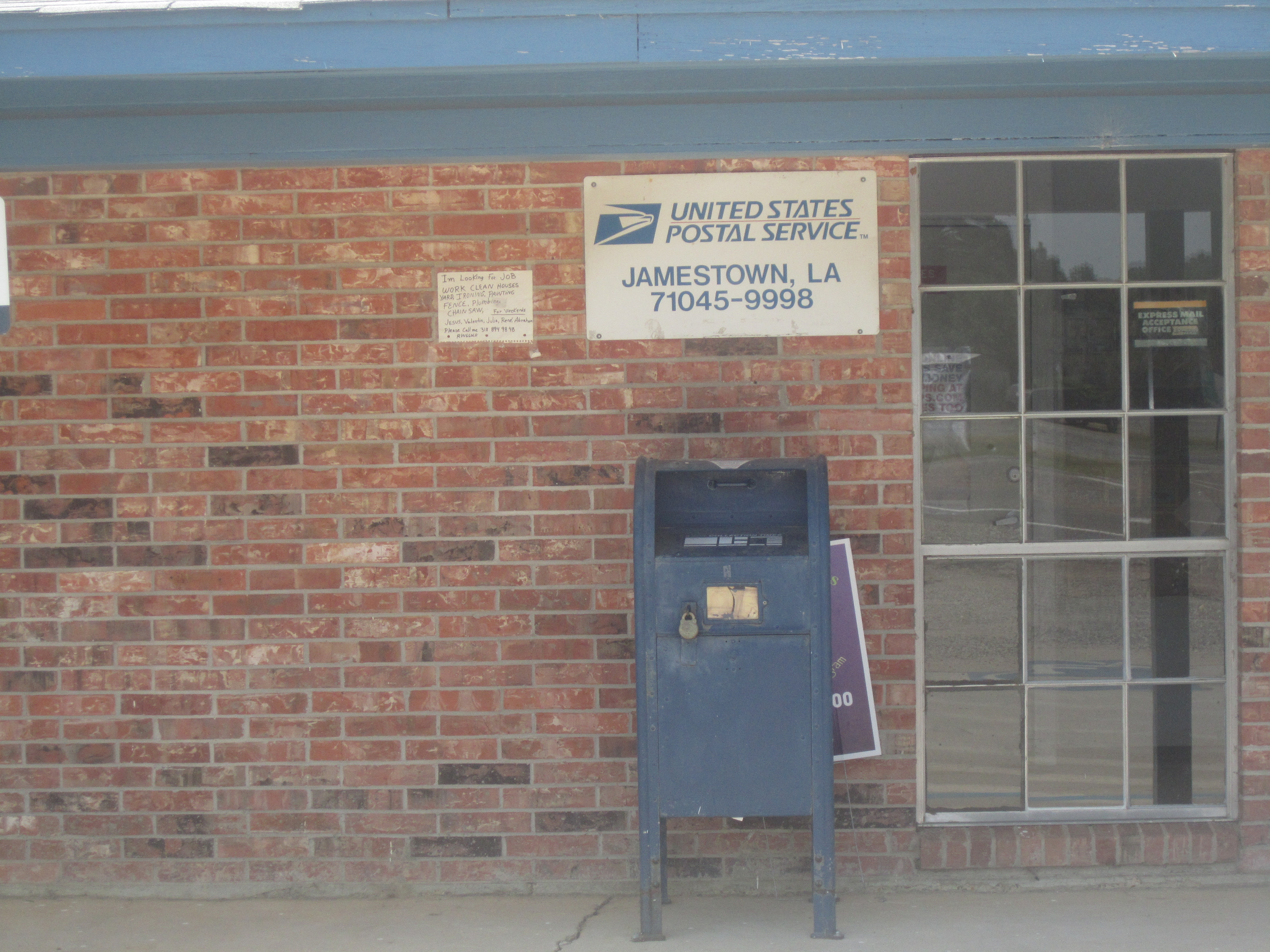
U.S. Post Office in Jamestown

According to the United States Census Bureau, the village has a total area of 1.8 sq mi (4.6 km^{2}), of which 0.019 sq mi (0.05 km^{2}), or 1.19%, is water.

=== Climate ===
This climatic region is typified by large seasonal temperature differences, with warm to hot (and often humid) summers and mild winters. According to the Köppen Climate Classification system, Jamestown has a humid subtropical climate, abbreviated "Cfa" on climate maps.

== Demographics ==
Historical population
Census	Pop.	Note	%±
1970	153		—
1980	131		−14.4%
1990	148		13.0%
2000	149		0.7%
2010	139		−6.7%
2020	100		−28.1%
2025 (est.)	91	▼	−9.0%
U.S. Decennial Census

As of the census of 2000, there were 149 people, 60 households, and 36 families residing in the village. The population density was 86.4 inhabitants per square mile (33.4/km^{2}). There were 80 housing units at an average density of 46.4 per square mile (17.9/km^{2}). The racial makeup of the village was 95.97% White, 3.36% African American and 0.67% Native American.

There were 60 households, out of which 26.7% had children under the age of 18 living with them, 48.3% were married couples living together, 6.7% had a female householder with no husband present, and 40.0% were non-families. 36.7% of all households were made up of individuals, and 16.7% had someone living alone who was 65 years of age or older. The average household size was 2.48 and the average family size was 3.33.

In the village, the population was spread out, with 26.8% under the age of 18, 8.7% from 18 to 24, 25.5% from 25 to 44, 22.1% from 45 to 64, and 16.8% who were 65 years of age or older. The median age was 37 years. For every 100 females, there were 75.3 males. For every 100 females age 18 and over, there were 81.7 males.

The median income for a household in the village was $23,125, and the median income for a family was $33,125. Males had a median income of $26,250 versus $21,875 for females. The per capita income for the village was $11,305. There were 6.9% of families and 9.1% of the population living below the poverty line, including no under eighteens and 33.3% of those over 64.

== Notable people ==
- Lee Smith, a retired professional baseball Hall of Fame pitcher.
- B. L. Shaw, an educator.
