= Black Lake Bayou =

Black Lake Bayou Bayou du lac Noir (former French name)
- Black Lake Bayou

Location
- Country: United States / Louisiana

Physical characteristics
- Mouth
  - location: Black Lake
- Length: 169 km (105 mi)

Black Lake Bayou is a 105-mile-long (169 km) waterway in northwest Louisiana, United States, that extends from north of Gibsland and travels south to Clarence. The watershed covers much of northwest Louisiana. The bayou meanders its way through Claiborne, Webster, Bienville, Red River and Natchitoches parishes. Black Lake Bayou empties into Black Lake, which drains to Saline Bayou, a tributary of the Red River.

Black Lake Bayou runs near the towns of Minden, Dubberly, Fryeburg, Gibsland, Mount Lebanon, Jamestown, Castor, Martin, and Ashland. Kepler Lake is also a part of the Black Lake Bayou watershed. Black Lake Bayou runs underneath Louisiana Highways 154, 156, 531, 792, 4, 507, and 155.

== Landscape ==
The bayou is choked by trees—bridge overpasses are the only places where the bayou is easily accessed and usually where people fish. There is a crude boat launch at Nix Crossing, which is 2–3 miles north of Castor and 3–4 miles south of Jamestown. Nix Crossing is one of the widest and deepest parts of Black Lake Bayou.

The Kansas City Southern Railroad had a bridge that crossed Black Lake Bayou at Nix Crossing until the rails to trails program deconstructed it—the pilings still stand in the water.

There are and have been two well built boat launches in Red River parish since the mid 1970s. The north most is called the 'Moody Stretch' boat launch and the southernmost, only a few miles away, is called the 'Cannon Place' boat launch. Both are clearly visible using Google Earth.

These two areas were built using parish and state funding in the mid 1970s. In addition to the boat launch there was also an area of approximately one acre cleared and fenced with sheds, barbecue grills, and latrines. Many people used these two areas for years. But by the mid 1990s the sheds, grills, and latrines were destroyed mostly due to vandalism. However, to this day the boat launches are still very usable.
