= Natalbany River =

River in Louisiana

- Natalbany River

Location
- Country: United States
- State: Louisiana
- Parishes: Livingston; Tangipahoa; St. Helena

Physical characteristics
- Source: Natalbany Creek
  - location: Amite, Tangipahoa Parish, Louisiana
  - coordinates: 30°44′54″N 90°34′36″W
  - elevation: 138 ft (42 m)
- Mouth: Lake Maurepas
  - location: Southwest Manchac, Tangipahoa Parish, Louisiana
  - coordinates: 30°21′22″N 90°29′23″W
  - elevation: −3 ft (−0.91 m)
- Length: 79.5 mi (127.9 km)

Basin features
- Cities: Manchac, Louisiana; Killian, Louisiana; Springfield, Louisiana; Albany, Louisiana; Manchac, Louisiana; Amite, Louisiana
- GNIS number: 1627750

The Natalbany River drains into Lake Maurepas in Louisiana in the United States. It is about 79.5 miles (127.9 km) long.

== Etymology ==
It is speculated that the name of the river is derived from the Choctaw words nita meaning bear and abani which means "to cook over a fire" in the Choctaw language.

== See also ==
- 2016 Louisiana floods
- List of Louisiana rivers
