= Boeuf River =

River in the United States of America

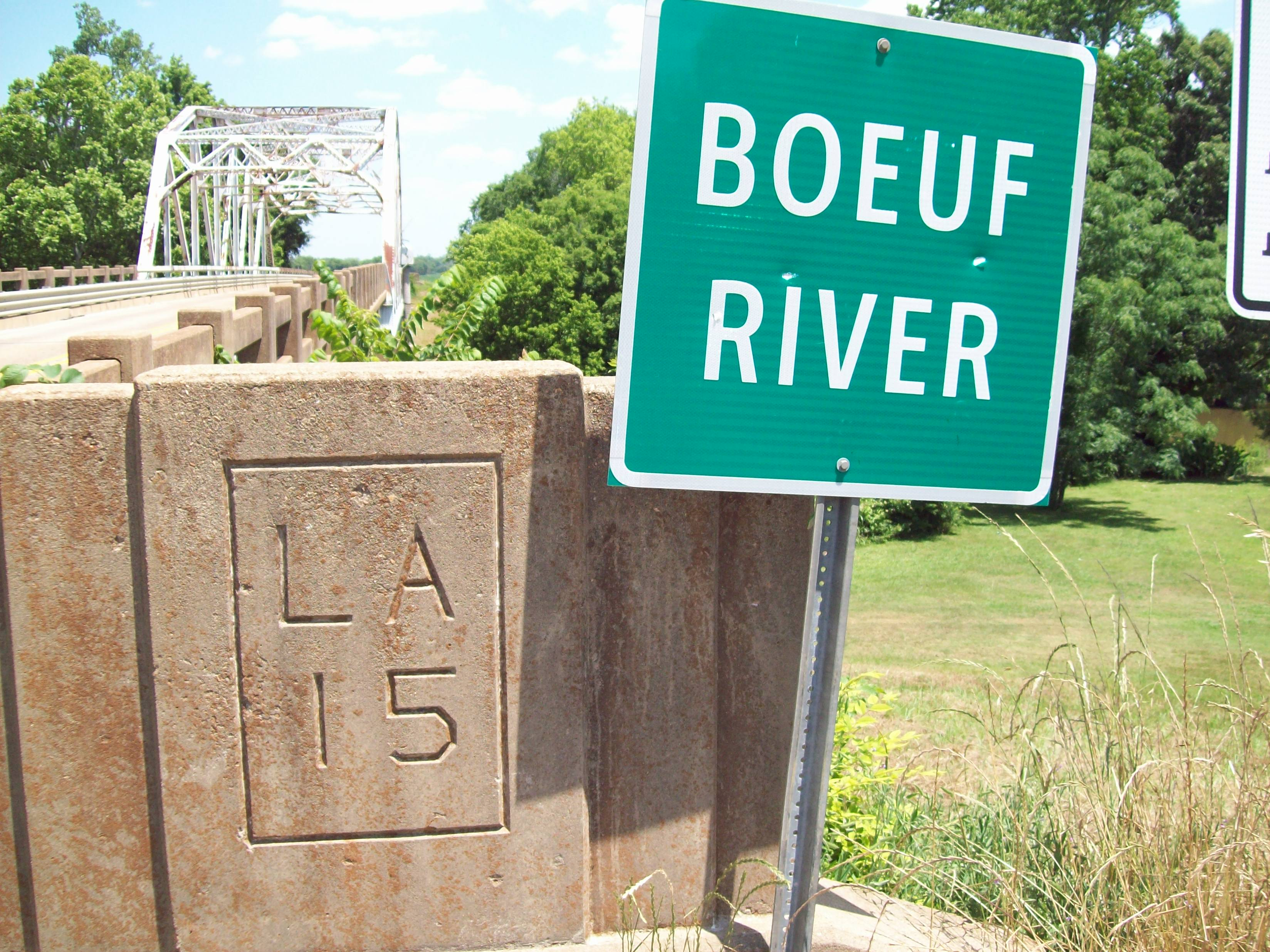
- LA 15 bridge spanning the Boeuf River
- Boeuf River

Location
- Country: United States
- States: Arkansas; Louisiana
- County: Chicot
- Parishes: Morehouse; West Carroll; Richland; Caldwell; Franklin; Catahoula

Physical characteristics
- Source: Near Lake Village
  - location: Arkansas
  - coordinates: 33°19′49″N 91°21′49″W
  - elevation: 110 ft (34 m)
- Mouth: Ouachita River
  - location: near Enterprise, Louisiana
  - coordinates: 31°51′25″N 91°47′9″W
  - elevation: 33 ft (10 m)
- Length: 216 mi (348 km)
- Discharge
  - location: USGS gage 07368000, near Girard, LA
  - average: 281 cu ft/s (8.0 m^{3}/s)
  - minimum: 0 cu ft/s (0 m^{3}/s)
  - maximum: 2,980 cu ft/s (84 m^{3}/s)

The Boeuf River (/bɛf/) is a tributary of the Ouachita River in the U.S. states of Arkansas and Louisiana. The river is about 216 miles (348 km) long. It flows into the Ouachita near Enterprise, Louisiana.

The Boeuf River's name comes from the French word bœuf, which means "ox".

== See also ==
- List of rivers of Arkansas
- List of rivers of Louisiana
