= Loggy Bayou =

Stream in northwestern Louisiana

Coordinates: 32°11′08″N 93°27′00″W

Loggy Bayou is a 17.3-mile-long (27.8 km) stream in northwestern Louisiana which connects Lake Bistineau with the Red River. Bistineau is the reservoir of Dorcheat Bayou, which flows 115 miles (185 km) southward from Nevada County, Arkansas, into Webster Parish. Loggy Bayou flows through south Bossier Parish, west of Ringgold, in a southerly direction through Bienville Parish, and into Red River Parish, where north of Coushatta it joins the Red River, a tributary of the Mississippi. At East Point, LA, the river has a mean annual discharge of 1,960 cubic feet per second.

== History ==
One of the first settlements on Loggy Bayou was Ninock, established in 1837 by Peabody Atkinson Morse, a Massachusetts native. Its name refers to the Great Raft, a historical log jam that clogged the Red and Atchafalaya rivers until its removal in the 1830s.

== Loggy Bayou WMA ==
Loggy Bayou WMA

The Loggy Bayou Wildlife Management Area (WMA) consists of 6,558 acres (26.54 km^{2}), approximately 20 miles southeast of Bossier City in south Bossier Parish. The WMA is bordered on the north by LA 154 and the entire east side is bordered by Loggy Bayou. The irregular west boundary partially borders Flat River and Bossier Point road. The southern boundary is US 71. The WMA is regulated by the Minden office of the United States Army Corps of Engineers that owns 2,138 acres, the Louisiana Office of State Lands owning 159 acres, and the Louisiana Department of Wildlife and Fisheries (LDWF). The area consists of an alluvial floodplain with bottomland hardwoods. Hunting, fishing, birding, and hiking are permitted. There is a boat launch and designated camping areas.

This Loggy Bayou should not be confused with a swamp of the same name in Drew County in southeastern Arkansas.
