= Lake Maurepas =

Lake in southeastern Louisiana, USA

- Lac Maurepas
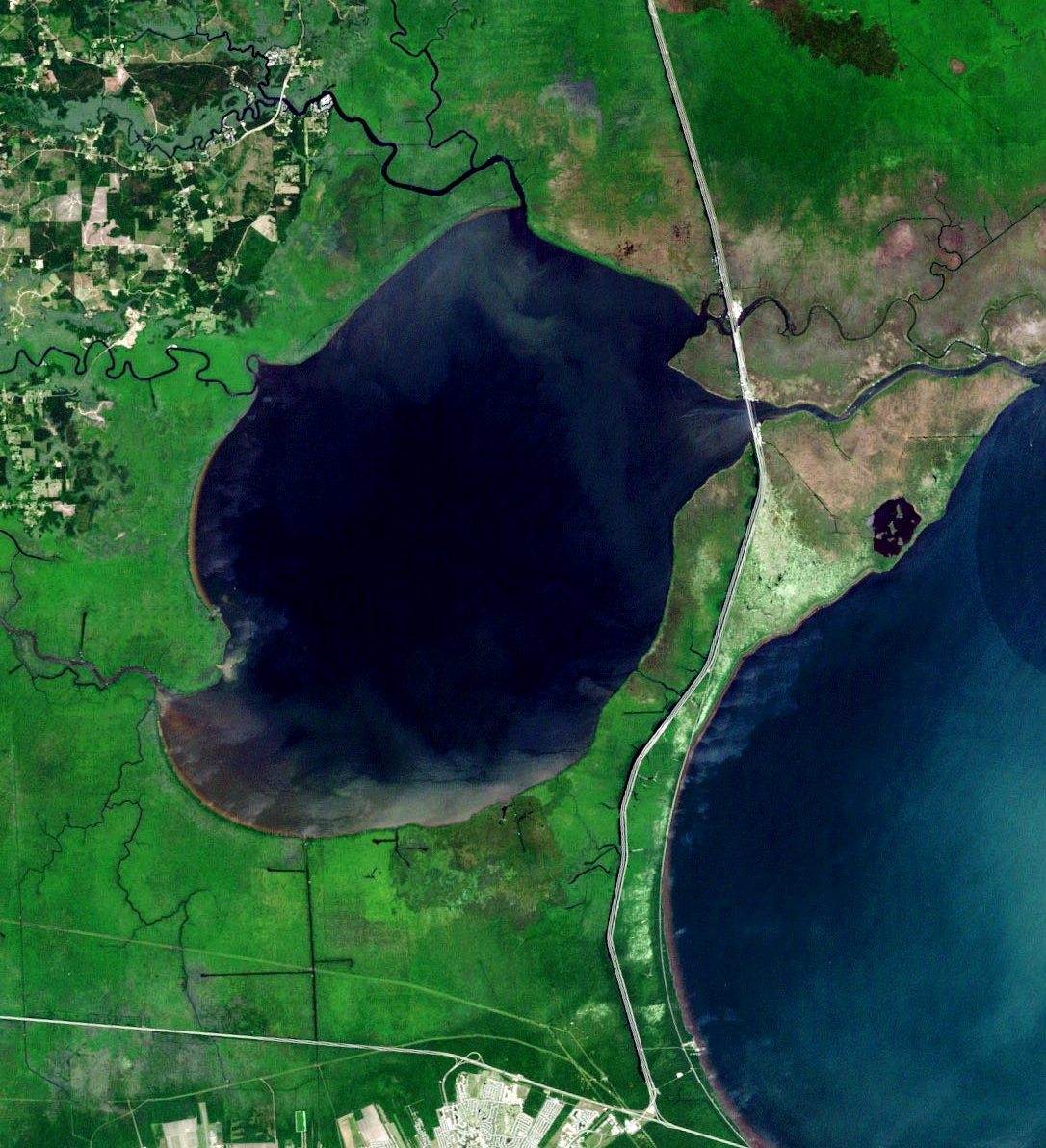
- Landsat view of the lake bordered at right by Lake Pontchartrain

- Location within Louisiana Location within the United States
- Location: Louisiana: Livingston Parish; St. John the Baptist Parish; Tangipahoa Parish
- Coordinates: 30°15′29″N 90°29′55″W
- Type: Estuary
- Basin countries: United States
- Surface area: 240 km^{2} (93 sq mi)
- Average depth: 3.0 m (9.8 ft)
- Surface elevation: −1 m (−3.3 ft)

Lake Maurepas (/ˈmɒrəpɔː/ MORR-ə-paw; French: Lac Maurepas) is located in southeastern Louisiana, approximately halfway between New Orleans and Baton Rouge, directly west of Lake Pontchartrain.

== Toponymy ==
Lake Maurepas was named for Jean-Frédéric Phélypeaux, comte de Maurepas, an eighteenth-century French statesman, and chief adviser to King Louis XVI. Jean-Frédéric was the son of Louis Phélypeaux, comte de Pontchartrain, for whom Lake Pontchartrain is named.

== Characteristics ==
Lake Maurepas is a circular-shaped, shallow, brackish tidal estuarine system. It is approximately 240 square kilometres (93 sq mi) in area and has a mean depth of about 3 meters (9.8 ft). The lake receives fresh water from four river systems: Blind River, Amite River, Tickfaw River, and the Natalbany River. The average freshwater input to Lake Maurepas from these rivers and other minor terrestrial sources is less than 3,400 cubic feet per second (96 m^{3}/s) (CWPPRA Environmental Workgroup, 2001).

To the north-east, Lake Maurepas is connected to Lake Pontchartrain by Pass Manchac (comprising South Pass and the smaller North Pass). The land between the two passes forms Jones Island, and the passes converge on the eastern side of the island into one unified Pass Manchac. Tidal exchange with Lake Pontchartrain through Pass Manchac is a more significant influence on Lake Maurepas’s volume and elevation than tributary freshwater discharge. The Manchac Swamp Bridge, which carries Interstate 55, traverses the narrow strip of land between lakes Maurepas and Pontchartrain.

The mean astronomical tide in Lake Maurepas is approximately 0.15 m (6 in). However, greater tidal amplitude is associated with meteorological events (i.e. winds) that influence both Lake Pontchartrain and Lake Maurepas. That results in interesting patterns of tidal exchange and, presumably, in situ mixing on weekly and fortnightly time scales. The salinity of the lake is directly influenced by exchange with Lake Pontchartrain.

The salinity of Lake Maurepas ranges between 0 and 3 parts per thousand (Day et al., 2004). Typically, salinity is higher along the eastern shore, near Pass Manchac. Due to Lake Maurepas’s shallow depth, even relatively low energy wave action results in sediment resuspension and, therefore, relatively high turbidity and low transparency, which influences the degree to which primary production can occur in the water column and benthos.

== Maurepas Swamp WMA ==
The Maurepas Swamp Wildlife Management Area (WMA) is located approximately 25 miles (40 km) north-west of New Orleans, along the south shore, as well as south of Lake Maurepas. The area is north of LaPlace and extends towards Sorrento. Initially, the Richard King Mellon Foundation donated 61,633 acres (249.42 km^{2}) to the Louisiana Department of Wildlife and Fisheries (LDWF) for the Maurepas Swamp WMA. Subsequent acquisitions and donations have brought the total to 122,098 acres (494.11 km^{2}). The Louisiana Department of Wildlife & Fisheries has noted that the swamp would benefit from "cooperative freshwater reintroduction projects designed to revive the swamp, and improved control of invasive plant species that have overtaken much of this important and scenic swamp."

== Proposed carbon sequestration project ==
Lake Maurepas is a site for a proposed carbon sequestration project by Occidental Petroleum and Air Products.

== Water quality research ==
In 2025, Fereshteh Emami, a professor at Southeastern Louisiana University, was removed from her role leading research on the lake's water quality after her team published findings of "alarming" levels of heavy metals, including arsenic, lead, and cadmium, and elevated nitrogen and phosphorus in the lake. The pollution was traced to industrial and agricultural runoff from the Blind, Tickfaw, and Amite rivers, with concentrations resembling a 2024 breach at the Gramercy-based Atlantic Alumina (Atalco) facility, whose waste entered drainage ditches flowing into the lake. Emami reported that a planned university-sponsored documentary about the research was canceled and that she had been reassigned to full-time teaching duties. The university described the change as a "routine adjustment," affirmed its support for the published research, and stated that Air Products, which funded but did not direct the study, had no influence over its findings.

== Gallery ==
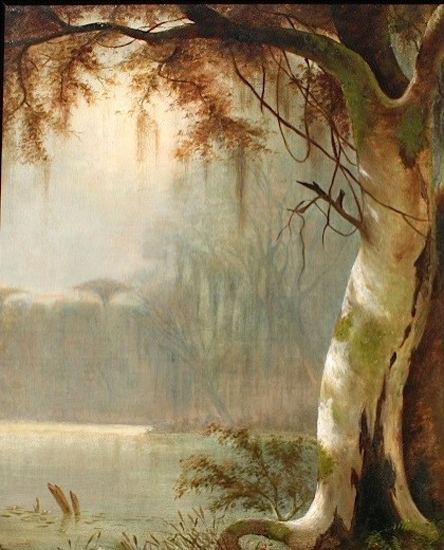
Lake Maurepas Bayou, 1880 painting by Joseph Rusling Meeker

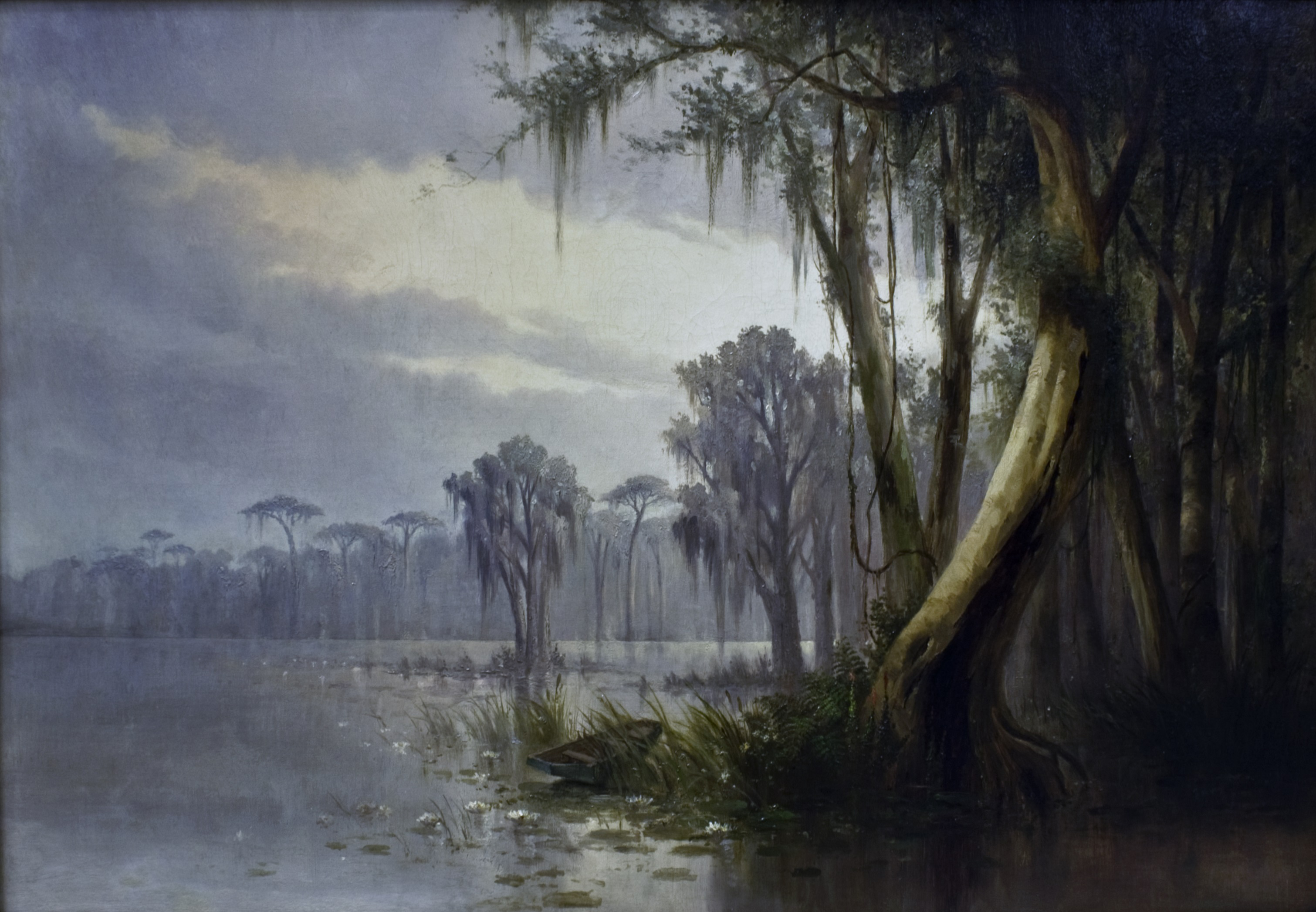
After a Storm -- Lake Maurepas, 1888 painting by Joseph Rusling Meeker

== See also ==
- Manchac, Louisiana
- Maurepas, France
- "The Lakes of Pontchartrain"
