= Houston River (Louisiana) =

- Location within Louisiana

Location
- Country: United States
- State: Louisiana
- Parish: Calcasieu

Physical characteristics
- Source: Confluence of bayous/forests/Bear Head Creek
  - location: Near Starks in Calcasieu Parish, Louisiana, United States
  - coordinates: 30°20′01″N 93°37′47″W
- Mouth: West Fork Calcasieu River
  - location: Near Westlake in Calcasieu, Calcasieu Parish, Louisiana, United States
  - coordinates: 30°17′41″N 93°16′28″W

Houston River begins at the crossing of LA 12, northeast of Starks, at the mouth of Bear Head creek in Calcasieu Parish, Louisiana, and terminates at the confluence with the West Fork Calcasieu River on the southwest border of Sam Houston Jones State Park.

== Alternate names ==
Houston River is also referred to as Houston Creek and sometimes erroneously as West Fork Calcasieu River. The river is considered a stream by the GNIS

== Drainage basin ==
Houston River is part of the Calcasieu-Mermentau Basin and a sub-basin of the West Fork Calcasieu (HUC 08080205).

== Controversy ==
The Louisiana Department of Environmental Quality (LDEQ) issued a fish consumption advisory 11/20/00 and revised 5/29/03 then 7/1/04, for the Calcasieu River Drainage Basin, because of elevated Mercury levels. The fish includes largemouth bass, freshwater drum, and bowfin (choupique, grinnel) The 2016 Louisiana Water Quality Integrated Report was issued by the LDEQ February 10, 2017, indicating that potential health risk exists. The report listed that certain areas such as "Primary Contact Recreation (PCR; swimming) and "Secondary Contact Recreation" (SCR; boating) received a "Fully supporting designated use (F), but "Fish and wildlife propagation" (FWP; fishing) received a "Not supporting designated use" (N). The suspected cause of impairment included chloride, Mercury in fish tissue, oxygen; dissolved, sulfates, and total dissolved solids. fecal coliform was also found in Bear Head creek up to Houston River as an impairment concerning swimming. The Environmental Protection Agency added Houston River to Louisiana’s 2014 Clean Water Act Section 303(d) list (Subsegment 030806) because of waterbody impairment combinations (WICs) of chloride, sulfates, and total dissolved solids.
