= Black Lake (Louisiana) =

- Lac Noir (former French name)
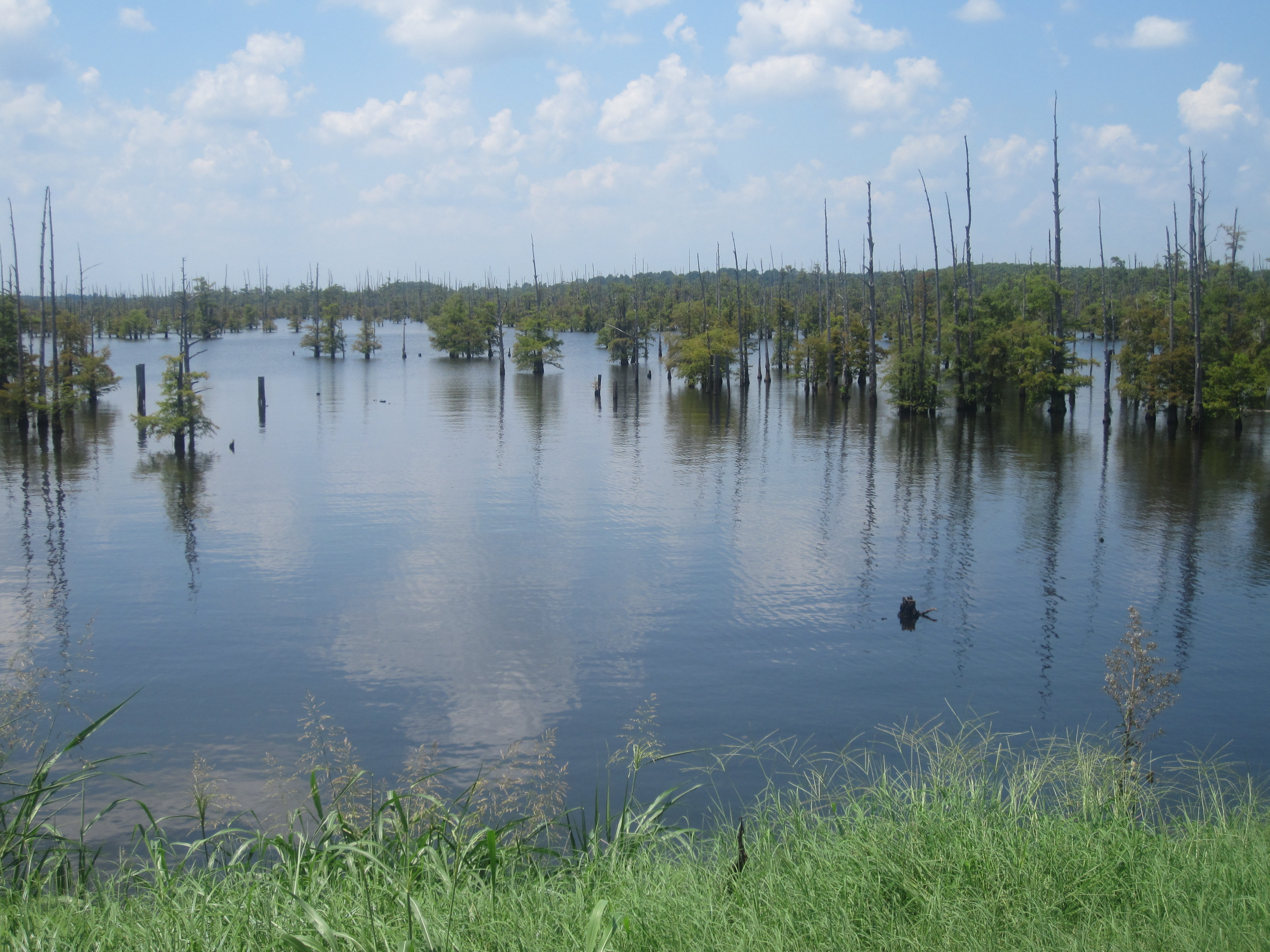
- Cypress trees dominate the waters of the lake.

- Location within Louisiana Location within the United States
- Location: Natchitoches Parish, Louisiana, United States
- Coordinates: 31°57′27″N 93°02′48″W
- Lake type: reservoir
- Primary inflows: Black Lake Bayou
- Primary outflows: Red River
- Basin countries: United States
- Max. length: 15 mi (24 km)
- Max. width: 1.8 mi (2.9 km)
- Surface area: about 7,000 acres (28 km^{2})
- Surface elevation: 102 ft (31 m)
- Settlements: Ashland, Campti, Clarence, Creston, and Goldonna

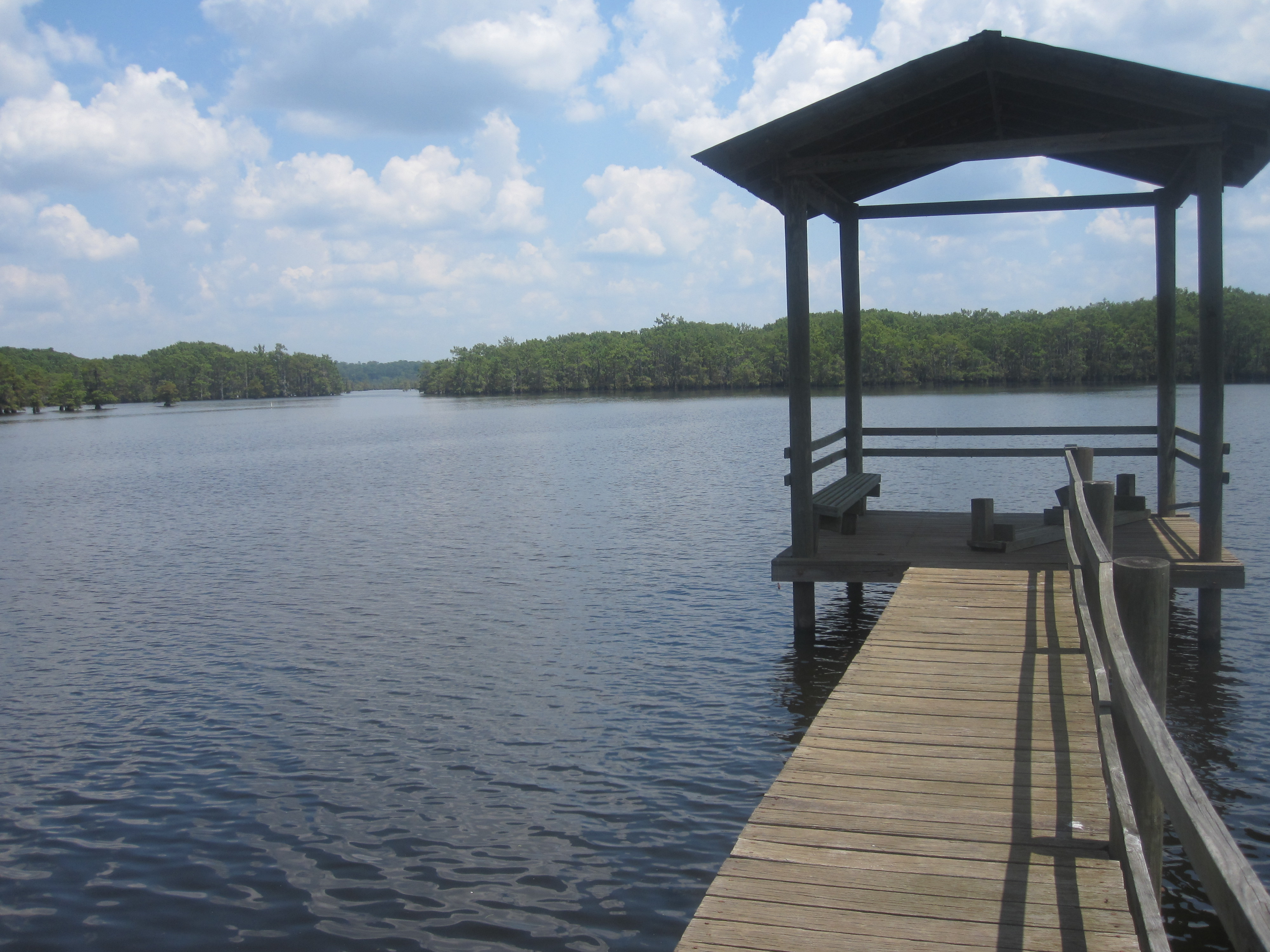
Pier extends into Black Lake at Bell's Camp near Campti.

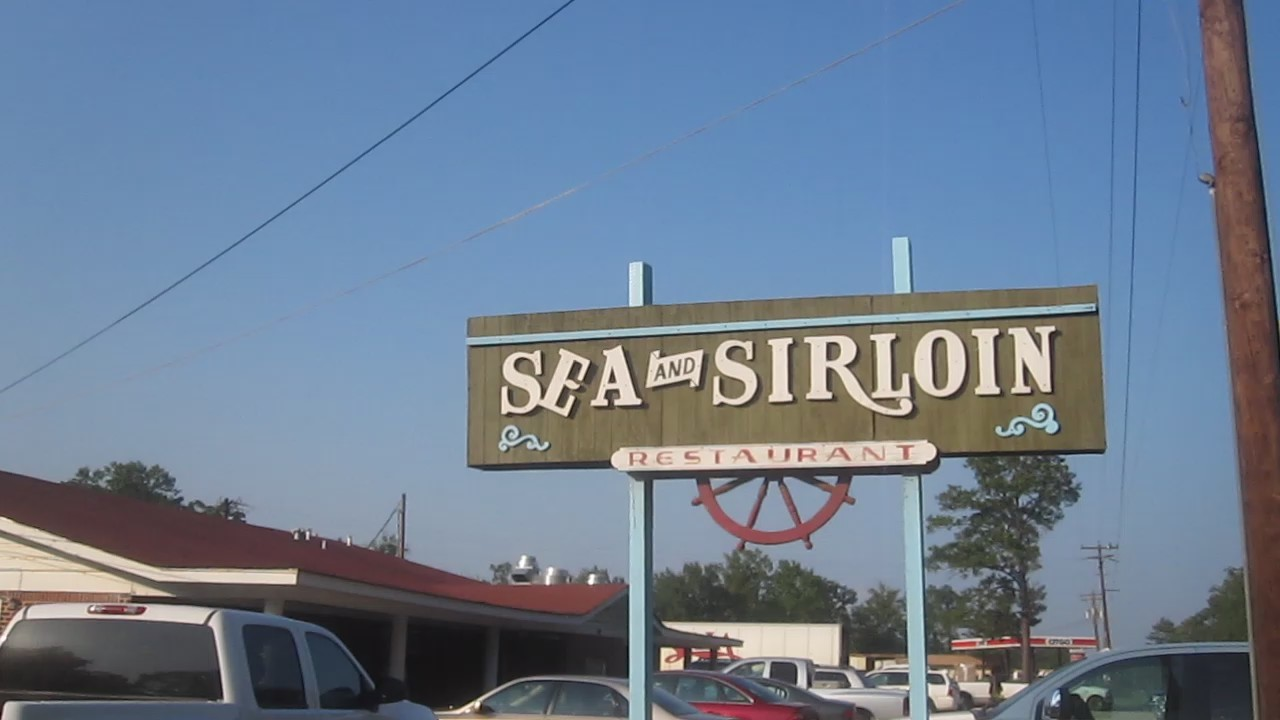
The former Sea and Sirloin Restaurant at 6454 Highway 9 on Black Lake

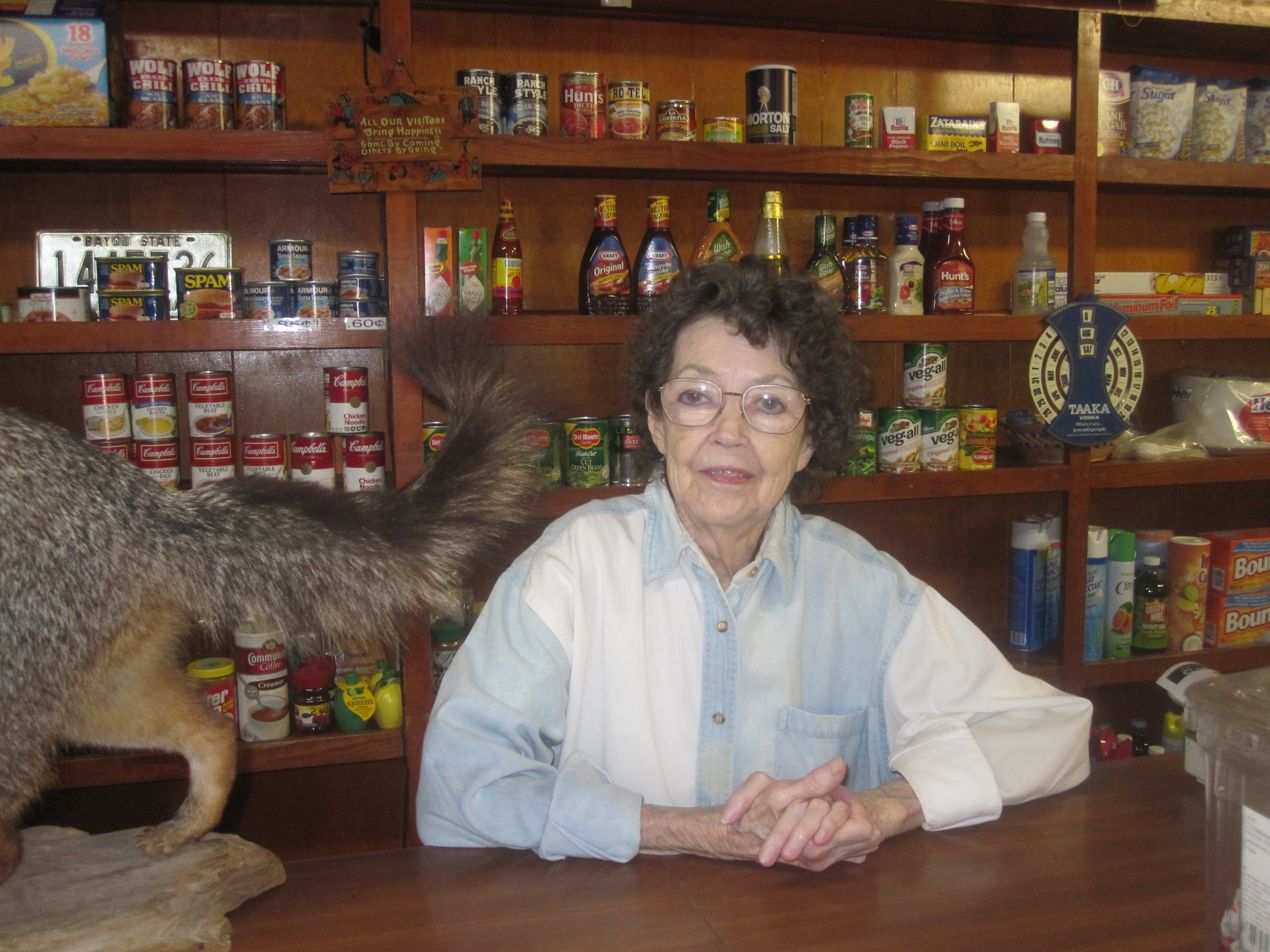
Joy Bell Wimberly at Bell's Camp (founded 1936)

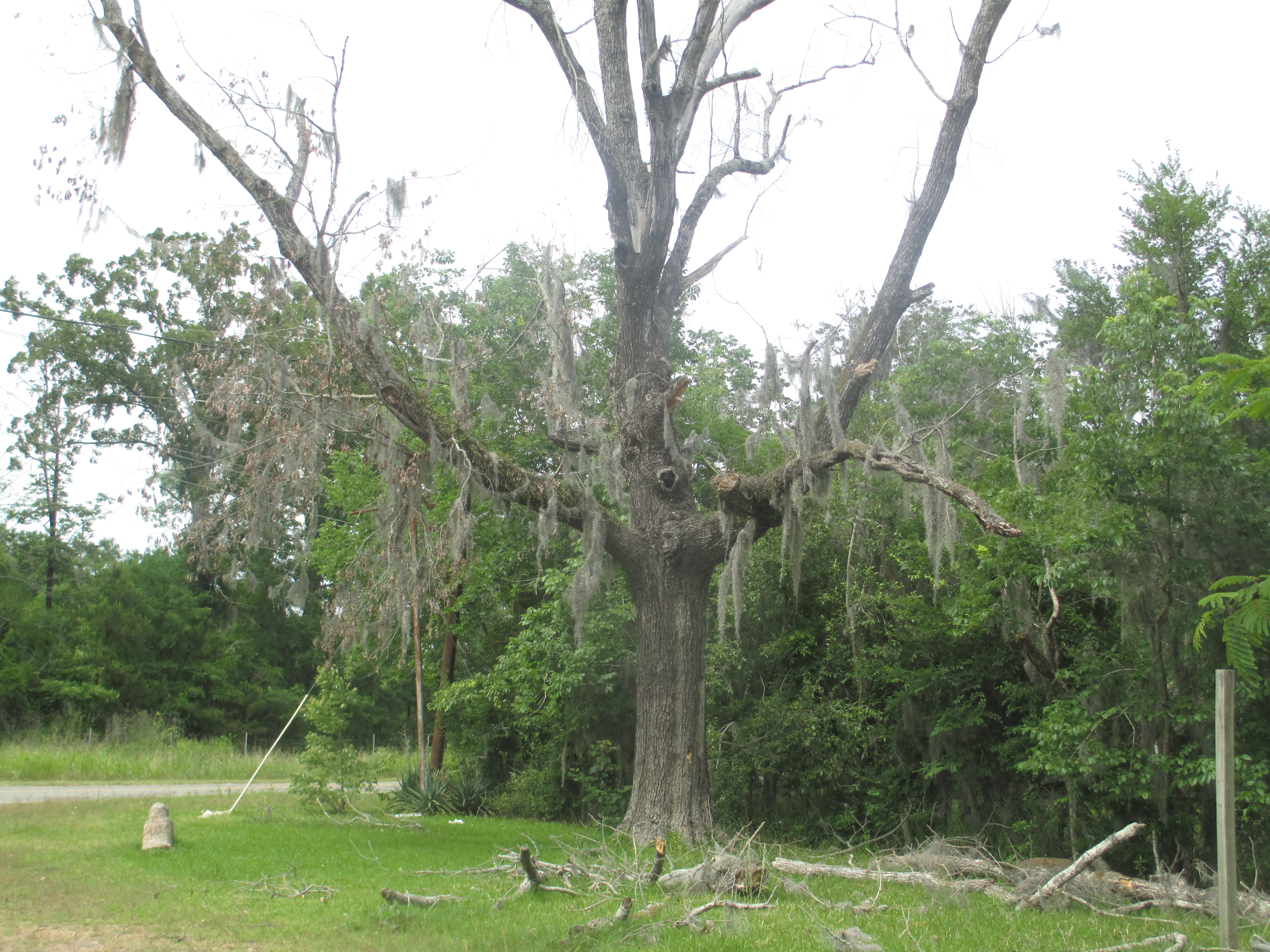
Moss-laden tree at Bell's Camp

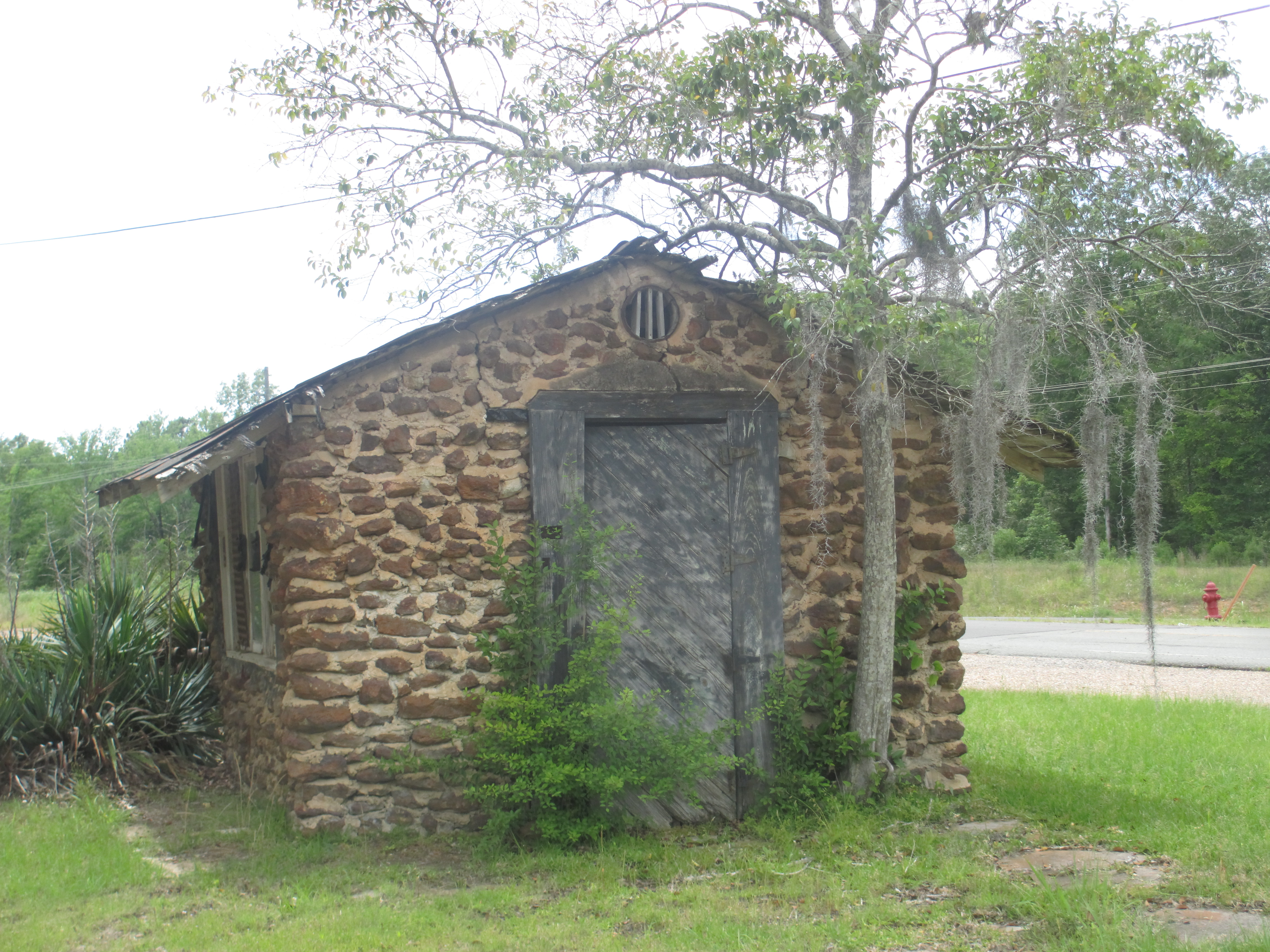
Abandoned stone structure at Bell's Camp

Black Lake is a reservoir located between Creston and Campti in North Louisiana. Water feeds into Black Lake from Black Lake Bayou, a watershed that extends from north of Gibsland in Bienville Parish and south to Clarence in Natchitoches Parish through the parishes of Claiborne, Webster, Bienville, Red River and Natchitoches. The elevation of the lake is 102 feet (31 m). Louisiana Highway 9 runs across Black Lake. On the west side of Highway 9 the body of water is called Black Lake — the east is called Clear Lake or Clear Lake Bayou. The Clear Lake side is near another body of water: Saline Lake. Between Clear Lake and Saline Lake is the Alan Chiverly Dam, constructed in 1934. Road 1226 also extends between the lakes. The full area of the Black Lake is 13,500 acres (5,500 ha). Black Lake itself is shallow so in cold temperatures the fish head to Clear Lake and continue on towards Black Bayou as the weather gets colder so that in colder months the fish can be found only in deeper waters. Most of the crappie found at Black Lake are black crappie.

Residents about Black Lake use the Campti and Clarence ZIP Codes, 71411 and 71414, respectively. They are zoned to Lakeview Junior/Senior High School. There are boat launches and campgrounds for fishing and boating. Bell's Camp, founded in 1936 by the late Albert and Eva Bell, is still operated by their daughter, Joy Bell Wimberly (born 1924). Nearby was a catfish and steak restaurant known as Sea and Sirloin, which opened in 1983.

== Landscape ==
Black Lake is wide in some places such as at the Hwy 9 bridge and tight in other places because of the growth of cypress trees. There are channels cut into the lake that allow clearance for boats. Boats stay in the channels or risk grounding on tree stumps. The aquatic vegetation such as moss, seaweed and algae are visible at surface level.

== Geography ==
The latitude and longitude coordinates for Black Lake are 31.9574, -93.0466 and the altitude is 102 feet (31 m).
