= Blind River (Louisiana) =

- Blind River

Location
- Country: United States
- State: Louisiana
- Parishes: St. James; Ascension; Livingston; St. John the Baptist

Physical characteristics
- Source
  - location: Southeast of Gonzales in St. James Parish
  - coordinates: 30.1241°N 90.8064°W
- Mouth: Lake Maurepas
  - coordinates: 30°12′43″N 90°35′42″W

Blind River is a waterway in southeastern Louisiana originating in the Maurepas Swamp Wildlife Management Area of St James Parish west of New Orleans and running northeasterly before turning east to flow into Lake Maurepas.

The lower reaches of Blind River form the boundary between Livingston Parish on the north shore and St James and St. John the Baptist Parish on the south shore.

The river is central to a suspended diversion project by the US Army Corps of Engineers.
