= Cross Bayou =

Coordinates: 32°31′12″N 93°44′48″W

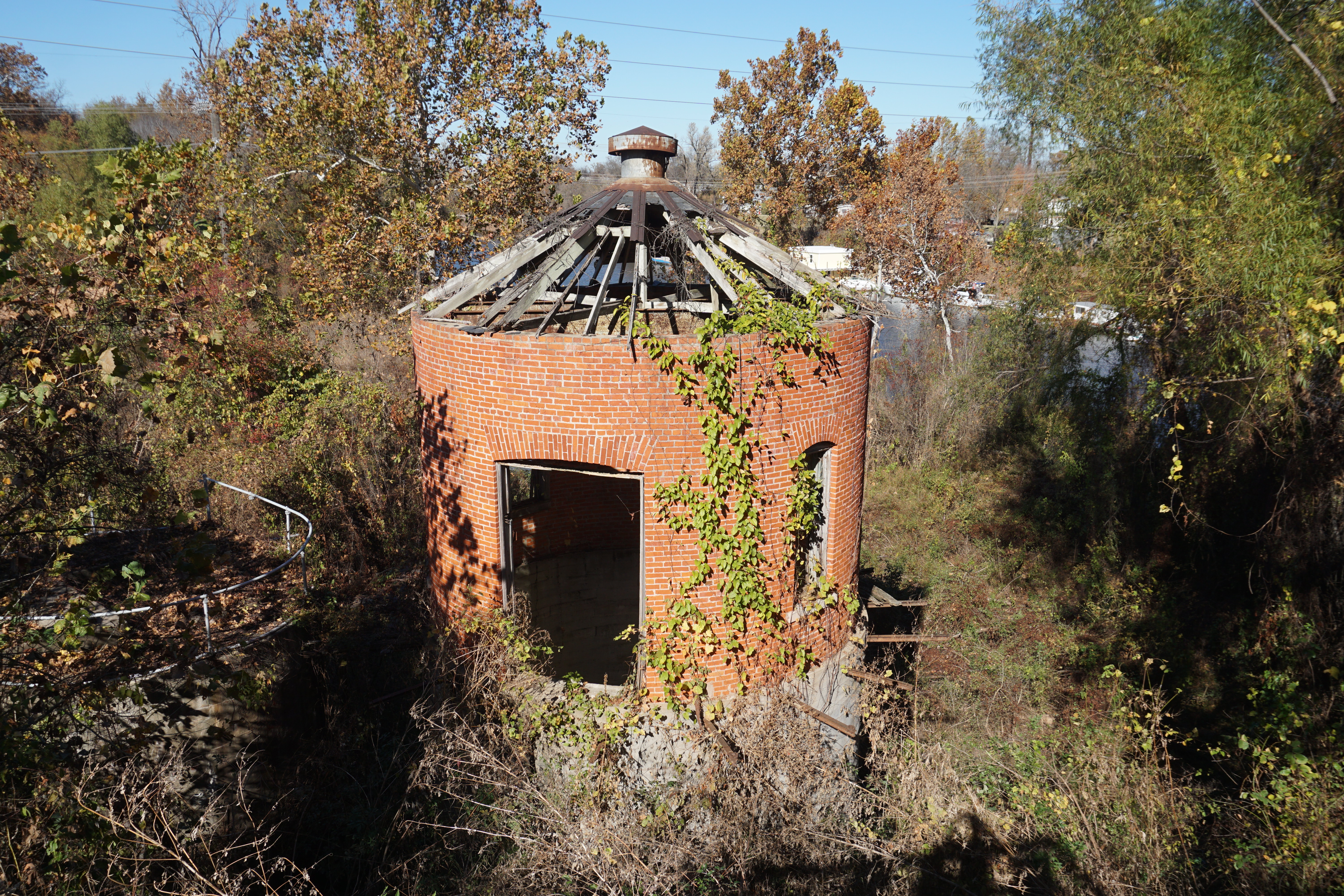
- Cross Bayou and a raw water pump house as viewed from the Shreveport Waterworks Pumping Station

Location
- Country: United States

Physical characteristics
- Source
  - location: Texas
- Mouth
  - location: Shreveport, Louisiana
- Discharge
  - location: Dixie, Louisiana
  - average: 2,659 cu/ft. per sec.

Cross Bayou is a 38.0-mile-long (61.2 km) river in Texas and Louisiana. It is a tributary of the Red River, part of the Mississippi River watershed.

It rises in southeastern Harrison County, Texas, 15 miles (24 km) southeast of Marshall, and flows east into Caddo Parish, Louisiana. It flows through 8-mile-long (13 km) Cross Lake on the outskirts of Shreveport, and joins the Red River in downtown Shreveport.

Not to be confused with Twelve Mile Bayou which connects Caddo Lake and Red River.

== Crossings ==
- Kansas City Southern Railroad Bridge, Cross Bayou is a historic railway bridge that is the next to last crossing before the Red River.

== See also ==
- List of rivers of Louisiana
- List of rivers of Texas
