= National Register of Historic Places listings in Bienville Parish, Louisiana =

Location of Bienville Parish in Louisiana

This is a list of the National Register of Historic Places listings in Bienville Parish, Louisiana.

This is intended to be a complete list of the properties on the National Register of Historic Places in Bienville Parish, Louisiana, United States. The locations of National Register properties for which the latitude and longitude coordinates are included below, may be seen in a map.

There are 13 properties listed on the National Register in the parish.

This National Park Service list is complete through NPS recent listings posted December 19, 2025.

== Current listings ==
	Name on the Register	Image	Date listed	Location	City or town	Description
1	Arcadia Colored High School Historic District	Arcadia Colored High School Historic District	June 10, 2014 (#14000308)	On 6th Street, between Crawford Street and Napoleon Street; 32°33′41″N 92°56′04″W	Arcadia	
2	Colbert House	Colbert House	February 1, 1980 (#80001699)	On Louisiana Highway 517, about 470 yards (430 m) south of intersection with Louisiana Highway 154; 32°29′59″N 93°02′56″W	Gibsland	Part (property #4) of Antebellum Greek Revival Buildings of Mount Lebanon Thematic Resources MPS.
3	Conly Site	Conly Site	September 14, 2001 (#01000995)	Address restricted	Ringgold vicinity	
4	Dog Trot	Dog Trot	February 1, 1980 (#80001700)	On Louisiana Highway 154, about 300 yards (270 m) west of intersection with Louisiana Highway 517 (Note: Northing UTM coordinates in NRHP listing are wrong for this property); 32°30′12″N 93°03′08″W	Gibsland	Part (property #7) of Antebellum Greek Revival Buildings of Mount Lebanon Thematic Resources MPS.
5	Down Home	Down Home	February 1, 1980 (#80001701)	On Louisiana Highway 154, about 700 yards (640 m) west of intersection with Louisiana Highway 517; 32°30′04″N 93°03′20″W	Gibsland	Part (property #8) of Antebellum Greek Revival Buildings of Mount Lebanon Thematic Resources MPS.
6	The Hill	The Hill	October 27, 1988 (#88002055)	Bounded by Orleans Street, Driskill Street and Florida Street; 32°32′40″N 92°55′31″W	Arcadia	
7	Jones House	Jones House	February 1, 1980 (#80001702)	On Louisiana Highway 154, about 100 yards (91 m) north of intersection with Louisiana Highway 517; 32°30′15″N 93°03′00″W	Gibsland	Part (property #3) of Antebellum Greek Revival Buildings of Mount Lebanon Thematic Resources MPS.
8	Mount Lebanon Baptist Church	Mount Lebanon Baptist Church	February 1, 1980 (#80001703)	On Louisiana Highway 154, about 260 yards (240 m) west of intersection with Louisiana Highway 517; 32°30′09″N 93°03′06″W	Gibsland	Part (property #6) of Antebellum Greek Revival Buildings of Mount Lebanon Thematic Resources MPS.
9	Stage Coach Inn	Stage Coach Inn	February 1, 1980 (#80001704)	On Stagecoach Trail, about 260 yards (240 m) east of Louisiana Highway 154 and Louisiana Highway 517 intersection 32°30′12″N 93°02′48″W	Gibsland	Part (property #5) of Antebellum Greek Revival Buildings of Mount Lebanon Thematic Resources MPS.
10	Sylvan Retreat	Sylvan Retreat	December 6, 1979 (#79001053)	2935 Mount Lebanon Street; 32°32′58″N 93°03′17″W	Gibsland	
11	Thurmond House	Thurmond House	February 1, 1980 (#80001705)	On Louisiana Highway 154, about 765 yards (700 m) north of intersection with Louisiana Highway 517; 32°30′36″N 93°02′58″W	Gibsland	Part (property #1) of Antebellum Greek Revival Buildings of Mount Lebanon Thematic Resources MPS.
12	Vicksburg, Shreveport, and Pacific Railroad Depot	Vicksburg, Shreveport, and Pacific Railroad Depot	February 29, 1988 (#87001516)	Southwest corner of North Hazel Street and North Railroad Avenue; 32°32′54″N 92°55′17″W	Arcadia	
13	Wayside Inn	Wayside Inn	February 1, 1980 (#80001706)	On Louisiana Highway 154, about 286 yards (262 m) north of intersection with Louisiana Highway 517; 32°30′21″N 93°03′00″W	Gibsland	Part (property #2) of Antebellum Greek Revival Buildings of Mount Lebanon Thematic Resources MPS.

== See also ==
- List of National Historic Landmarks in Louisiana
- National Register of Historic Places listings in Louisiana
