= Gibsland–Coleman High School =

School in Louisiana, United States

Gibsland-Coleman High School

Location
- 501 South Tenth Street; Gibsland, (Bienville Parish), Louisiana 71028; United States; 32.5374°N 93.0619°W

Information
- Type: Public high school
- School district: Bienville Parish School Board
- Principal: Christopher E. Jackson
- Staff: 21.00 (FTE)
- Enrollment: 157 (2023-2024)
- Student to teacher ratio: 7.48
- Colors: Purple and gold
- Mascot: Bulldog
- Nickname: Bulldogs
- Website: www.bpsb.us/o/gchs

Gibsland–Coleman High School, also known as Gibsland-Coleman Complex, is a K-12 public school in Gibsland, Louisiana, United States. It is a part of the Bienville Parish School Board. It was previously named Gibsland Colored High School and Coleman High School.

== History ==
The site of the Gibsland-Coleman Complex is the same location as Coleman College, an African American segregated secondary school and the first African American institution for higher learning in North Louisiana. In 1937, Coleman College closed due to the Great Depression and the campus was sold to the Bienville School District.

It was re-opened as Gibsland Colored High School, a segregated African American public secondary school (and was later known as Coleman High School). John Sherman Campbell (1897–1976), a noted educator, wildlife manager, conservationist, served as the principal from 1935 to 1938.

In 1970, the school was renamed Gibsland–Coleman High School, after full integration with the segregated all-white Gibsland High School.

On February 7, 2014, a large marker was unveiled at the Gibsland–Coleman School Complex dedicated to Coleman College.

== Demographics ==
The Gibsland–Coleman High School receives Title I funding. In 2020–2021, the school had a 90% minority enrollment, and enrolled primary African American students.

== Athletics ==
Gibsland–Coleman High School athletics competes in the LHSAA. Nearby public schools include Arcadia High School, Ringgold High School, and Castor High School.

== Notable alumni ==
- Charles M. Blow (born 1970), journalist, class of 1988
- Wilmer Clemont Fields (1922–2018), Southern Baptist minister, public relations executive, newspaper editor, class of 1939 at Gibsland High School
