= Wayside Inn (disambiguation) =

Wayside Inn Historic District is a historic district in Sudbury, Massachusetts, including the Wayside Inn.

Wayside Inn may also refer to:

- Wayside Inn (Gibsland, Louisiana)
- Wayside Inn (Arlington, Massachusetts)
- The Wayside Inn (Sudbury), Massachusetts
