= Ringgold High School =

Ringgold High School may refer to:

- Ringgold High School (Georgia) in Ringgold, Georgia
- Ringgold High School (Louisiana) in Ringgold, Louisiana
- Ringgold High School (Pennsylvania) in Monongahela, Pennsylvania
