= Wilmer Clemont Fields =

- Born: March 16, 1922; Saline, Louisiana, U.S.
- Died: December 2, 2018 (aged 96); Nashville, Tennessee, U.S.
- Education: Louisiana College; Southern Baptist Theological Seminary
- Occupation(s): Southern Baptist minister, public relations executive and newspaper editor
- Spouses: Rebecca Elizabeth Hagan; Lawana Jane House McIver
- Children: 1 son, 2 daughters

Wilmer Clemont Fields (March 16, 1922 – December 2, 2018) was an American Southern Baptist minister, public relations executive, newspaper editor, and the (co-)author or editor of 30 books. He was a pastor in Louisiana, Kentucky and Mississippi. He was the editor of The Baptist Record and Baptist Program, a director of the Baptist Press, and the vice president for public relations for the executive committee of the Southern Baptist Convention. He was a defender of the freedom of the press.

== Early life and education ==
Fields was born on March 16, 1922, in Saline, Louisiana. He was baptized at the Old Saline Baptist Church at the age of 8; by the age of 16, he was preaching at the First Baptist Church of Arcadia and the First Baptist Church of Gibsland in Louisiana.

Fields graduated from the Gibsland High School in 1939. He graduated from Louisiana College with a bachelor's degree in 1943. He attended the Southern Baptist Theological Seminary, where he earned a master of Theology in 1946, followed by a doctorate of Theology in 1950. Fields returned to Louisiana College to give the keynote address on Founders' Day in 1976.

== Career ==
Fields began his formal pastorate at the Woodworth Baptist Church in Woodworth, Louisiana. He also pastored churches in Woodworth, Belcher, and Gilliam in Louisiana, as well as the Bethany Baptist Church of Louisville, Kentucky from 1948 to 1951. He served as the pastor of the First Baptist Church in Yazoo City, Mississippi from 1951 to 1956. He was the president of the board of the Mississippi Baptist Convention for two years, and the editor of its newspaper, The Baptist Record, from 1956 to 1959.

Fields worked for the executive committee of the Southern Baptist Convention in Nashville, Tennessee from 1959 to 1987, where he started as the secretary and retired as the vice president for public relations. He was the editor of its magazine, Baptist Program, from 1959 to 1972. He was also the director of the Baptist Press, the SBC's news service. Fields supported the freedom of the press, arguing, "We have to be honest, transparent, trustworthy. Maybe that includes telling them some things Baptists wouldn't want them to know, but they depend on their sources shooting straight with them." Fields retired in 1987, after 28 years at the SBC, and he was succeeded by Alvin C. Shackleford.

Fields was a member of the Public Relations Society of America. He served as the president of the Associated Church Press, the Baptist Public Relations Association, and the Religious Public Relations Council. He served on the boards of the Council on Religion and International Affairs as well as the Nashville chapter of the National Conference of Christians and Jews. Fields was the namesake of the Baptist Public Relations Association's Wilmer C. Fields Awards Competition. He received the Religious Freedom Award from the Associated Baptist Press in 2006.

Fields was the (co-)author or editor of 30 books.

== Personal life and death ==
Fields was married twice. He first married Rebecca Elizabeth Hagan in 1946, who died in 2002. The following year, he married his second wife, Lawanna Jane House McIver, who was the widow of Bruce McIver, the pastor of Wilshire Baptist Church in Dallas, Texas. Fields taught Sunday school at the First Baptist Church in Nashville for two decades.

Fields died on December 2, 2018, in Nashville, Tennessee. His funeral was held at the Woodmont Baptist Church in Nashville on December 8, 2018.

== Selected works ==
- Fields, Wilmer C., ed. (1976). Religious Public Relations Handbook: For Local Congregations of All Denominations. New York City: Religious Public Relations Council. OCLC 2418989.
