= Louisiana's 11th House of Representatives district =

American legislative district

Louisiana's 11th State House of Representatives district
Representative
Rashid Armand Young; D–Homer

Louisiana's 11th House of Representatives district is one of 105 Louisiana House of Representatives districts. It is currently represented by Democratic Rashid Armand Young of Homer.

== Geography ==
HD11 includes the towns of Haynesville, Homer, and Arcadia and part of the city of Ruston.

== Election results ==
Year	Winning candidate	Party	Percent	Opponent	Party	Percent
2011	Patrick O. Jefferson	Democratic	62.2%	Rory Bedford	Democratic	37.8%
2015	Patrick O. Jefferson	Democratic	100%			
2019	Patrick O. Jefferson	Democratic	100%			
2023	Rashid Armand Young	Democratic	Cancelled			
