= Wimpy Giddens =

American football player (1914–1959)

No. 26, 43
- Position: Tackle

Personal information
- Born: November 25, 1914; Ringgold, Louisiana, U.S.
- Died: February 12, 1959 (aged 44); Wilmington, Delaware, U.S.
- Listed height: 6 ft 2 in (1.88 m)
- Listed weight: 220 lb (100 kg)

Career information
- High school: Ringgold (LA)
- College: Louisiana Tech

Career history
- Philadelphia Eagles (1938); Boston Yanks (1944)

Career statistics
- Games played: 16
- Stats at Pro Football Reference

Herschel Orine "Wimpy" Giddens (November 25, 1914 – February 12, 1959) was an American football tackle who played in the National Football League for the Philadelphia Eagles in 1938 and the Boston Yanks in 1944. He died on February 12, 1959, at his home in Wilmington, Delaware, after a short illness.
