= Thurmond House (Gibsland, Louisiana) =

Historic house in Louisiana, United States

- U.S. National Register of Historic Places
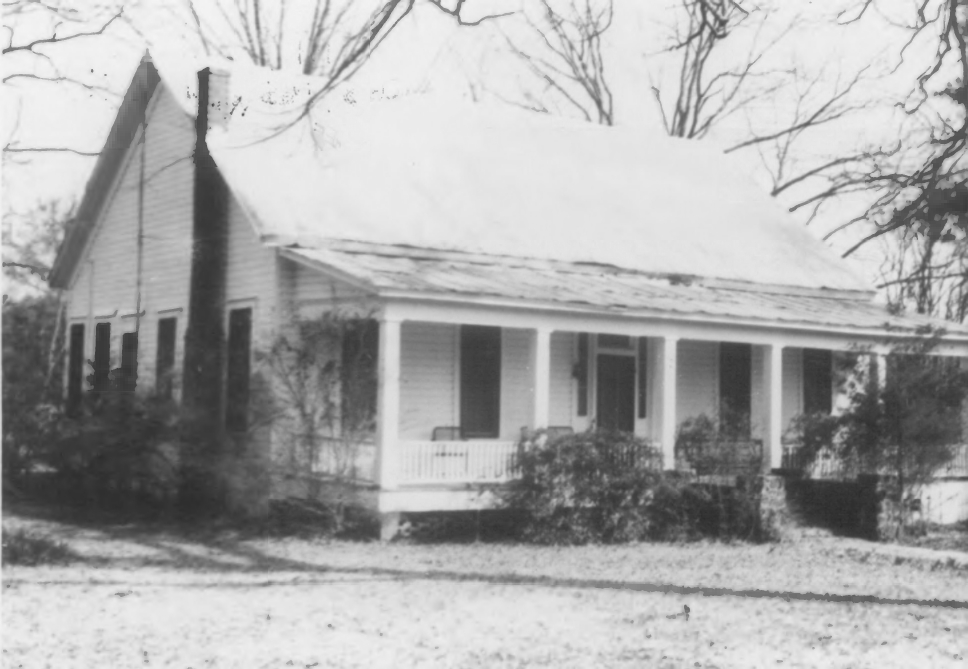

- Location within Louisiana
- Location: On Louisiana Highway 154, about 765 yards (700 m) north of intersection with Louisiana Highway 517
- Nearest city: Gibsland, Louisiana
- Coordinates: 32°30′36″N 93°02′58″W
- Area: 0.5 acres (0.20 ha)
- Built: c.1855
- Architectural style: Greek Revival
- MPS: Antebellum Greek Revival Buildings of Mount Lebanon TR
- NRHP reference No.: 80001705
- Added to NRHP: February 1, 1980

The Thurmond House, on Louisiana Highway 154 (Mt. Lebanon Road) near Gibsland in Bienville Parish, Louisiana, was built in the 1850s. It was listed on the National Register of Historic Places in 1980.

It is a five-bay hewn frame house with a central hall plan. It has a rear "L" wing. Its sides are covered with clapboarding which was replaced around 1900. The house has simple Greek Revival details evident in its front gallery, front door with transom and sidelights, and its one original surviving mantel. Two of its original four chimneys survive. It was built by the Thurmond family, early settlers of Mt. Lebanon, Louisiana and was still owned by descendants in 1980.

== See also ==
- National Register of Historic Places listings in Bienville Parish, Louisiana
