= Mount Lebanon Baptist Church =

Historic church in Louisiana, United States

- U.S. National Register of Historic Places
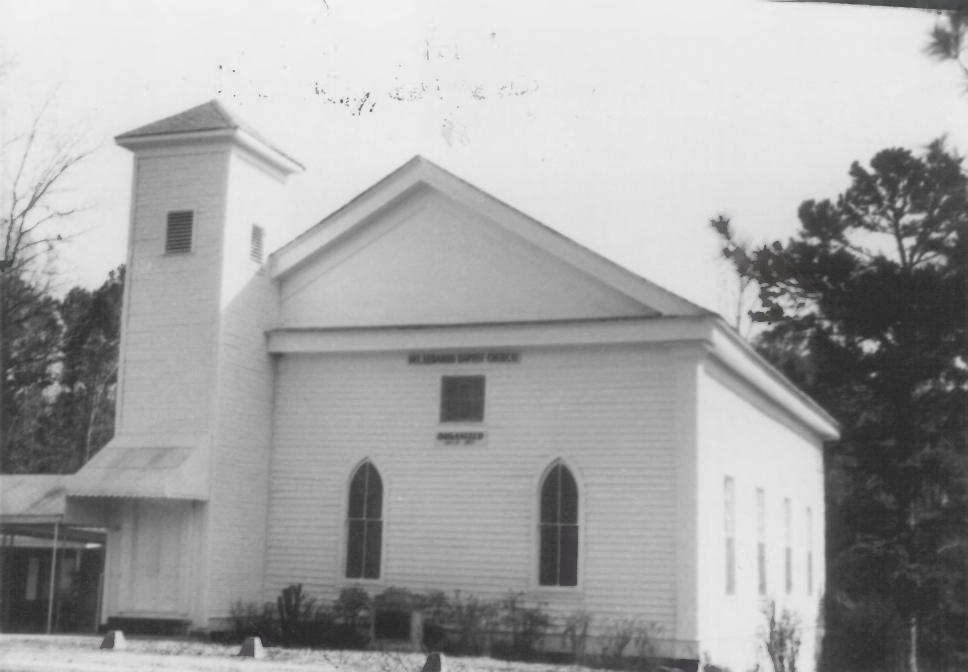

- Location within Louisiana Location within the United States
- Location: On Louisiana Highway 154, about 260 yards (240 m) west of intersection with Louisiana Highway 517
- Nearest city: Gibsland, Louisiana
- Coordinates: 32°30′09″N 93°03′06″W
- Area: 0.5 acres (0.20 ha)
- Built: 1837
- Architectural style: Greek Revival
- MPS: Antebellum Greek Revival Buildings of Mount Lebanon TR
- NRHP reference No.: 80001703
- Added to NRHP: February 1, 1980

Mount Lebanon Baptist Church is a historic church on Louisiana Highway 154, about 260 yards (240 m) west of intersection with Louisiana Highway 517, in Bienville Parish. It was built in 1837 in a Greek Revival style and was added to the National Register in 1980.

It is a pedimented with pilasters at its corners. It is framed by hewn timbers. It was deemed significant as "a good representative example of the simple frame Greek Revival country churches which were built in many parts of the country during the 1840s and 1850s. Although there have been modifications, the original building is still distinguishable. The modifications are typical of their own period and have acquired architectural value in their own right."

== See also ==
- National Register of Historic Places listings in Bienville Parish, Louisiana
