= Jones House (Gibsland, Louisiana) =

Historic house in Louisiana, United States

- U.S. National Register of Historic Places
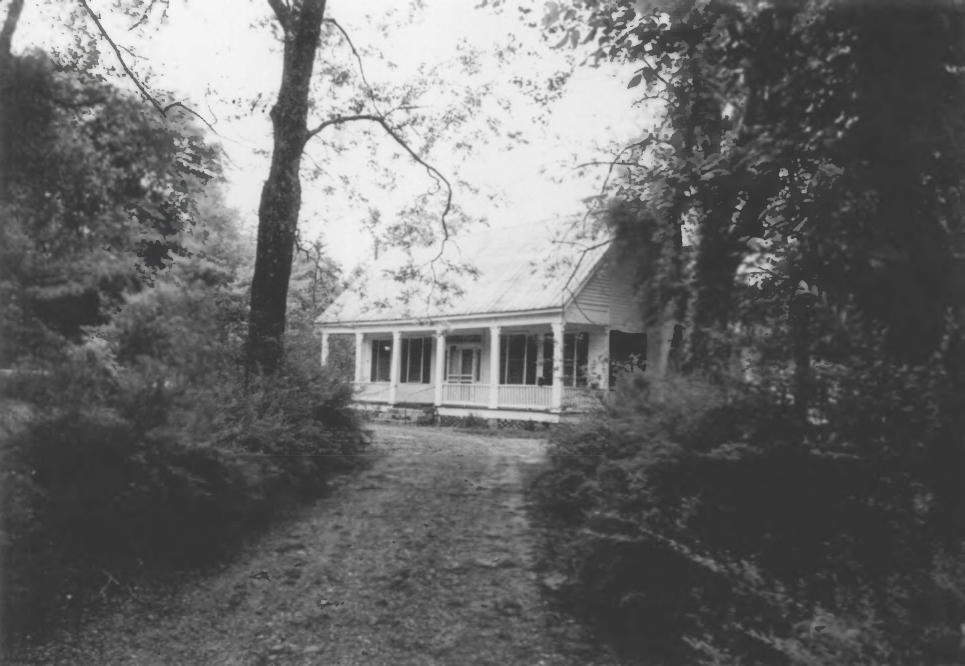

- Location within Louisiana
- Location: On Louisiana Highway 154, about 100 yards (91 m) north of intersection with Louisiana Highway 517
- Nearest city: Gibsland, Louisiana
- Coordinates: 32°30′15″N 93°03′00″W
- Area: 0.5 acres (0.20 ha)
- Built: c.1840
- Architectural style: Vernacular Greek Revival
- MPS: Antebellum Greek Revival Buildings of Mount Lebanon TR
- NRHP reference No.: 80001702
- Added to NRHP: February 1, 1980

The Jones House, also known as Smith House, is a historical house located on Louisiana Highway 154 about 100 yards (91 m) north of its junction with Louisiana Highway 517. It was built in about 1840 and was listed on the National Register of Historic Places in 1980.

It was built as log dog trot house and was modified in about 1870. In 1980 the current building was a five-bay central hall plan house. It was deemed "a typical example of the simplest version of the Greek Revival when it was applied to residences in Louisiana." It was the home of Louisiana state senator John P. Jones from about 1900 to about 1930.

== See also ==
- National Register of Historic Places listings in Bienville Parish, Louisiana
