= Arcadia Airport =

Arcadia Airport may refer to:

- Arcadia–Bienville Parish Airport in Arcadia, Louisiana, United States (FAA: 5F0)
- Arcadia Municipal Airport in Arcadia, Florida, United States (FAA: X06)
