= Arcadia Colored High School =

- Arcadia Colored High School Historic District
- U.S. National Register of Historic Places
- U.S. Historic district
- Location within Louisiana
- Location: On 6th Street, between Crawford Street and Napoleon Street, Arcadia, Louisiana
- Coordinates: 32°33′41″N 92°56′04″W
- Area: 4.6 acres (1.9 ha)
- Built: c. 1942 to c. 1955
- Architect: C. Scott Yeager
- Architectural style: Modern
- NRHP reference No.: 14000308
- Added to NRHP: June 10, 2014

The Arcadia Colored High School was a high school for African-American students in Arcadia, Louisiana, United States. It was originally known as Bienville Parish Training School and was later known as Crawford High School. It eventually was a campus of 10 buildings.

== School campus buildings ==
The Arcadia Colored High School Historic District was listed as a historic district on the National Register of Historic Places in 2014. It included four contributing buildings, one of which is somewhat Modern Movement in style, but which are otherwise nondescript architecturally.

The four surviving buildings are one-story buildings. The oldest is "Classroom Building A" from about 1942. It has a four-room plan very similar to the Rosenwald Fund's standard plan for a "Four Teacher Community School to Face East or West", although its windows actually face north and south instead. It is built of concrete blocks on a concrete foundation the a gable roof having deep eaves. "Classroom Building B", built about 1955, was used for business and typing classes. It is a one-story, wood-frame structure with a red brick veneer laid in running bond. The 1951 Classroom and Administration building has "mid-century modern aesthetic is asserted through the horizontality of the design, its flat roof with deep eaves and its clean, sharp lines." The Auditorium-Gymnasium building, built in 1954, was designed by architect C. Scott Yeager.

== See also ==
- National Register of Historic Places listings in Bienville Parish, Louisiana
