= Coleman College (Louisiana) =

American school in Louisiana (1887–1950)

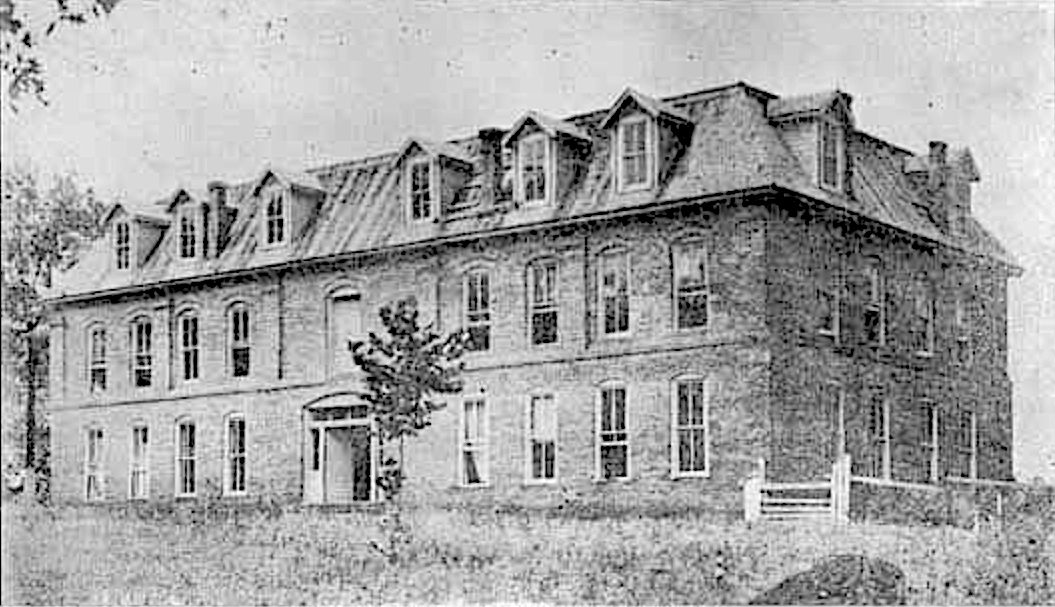
- Coleman College in 1915 in Gibsland, Louisiana

Location
- Gibsland, Louisiana, U.S. (1887 to 1937); Shreveport, Louisiana, U.S. (1943 to 1950s); 32.538401°N 93.062053°W

Information
- Established: 1887
- Founder: Oliver Lewis Coleman
- Closed: 1950s

Coleman College (1887–1937; and 1943–1950s), formerly Coleman Academy, was a segregated African American secondary school founded in Gibsland, Louisiana, and incorporated in 1887. It was the first secondary school for Black students in northern Louisiana. It was founded by Oliver Lewis Coleman. From 1943 to 1950s, the school relocated to Shreveport, Louisiana, before its closure.

== History ==
The school was founded by Oliver Lewis Coleman (commonly known as O. L. Coleman), an African-American educator and graduate of Alcorn State University, from Livingston, Mississippi. The school first opened in 1887 with 10 students and was hosted in a church building, at the time there was no other secondary school for Black students in north Louisiana. It was affiliated with the Baptist Church, and supported by the American Baptist Home Mission Society. The institution produced primarily teachers and preachers; and in the early years had class sizes at around eight students.

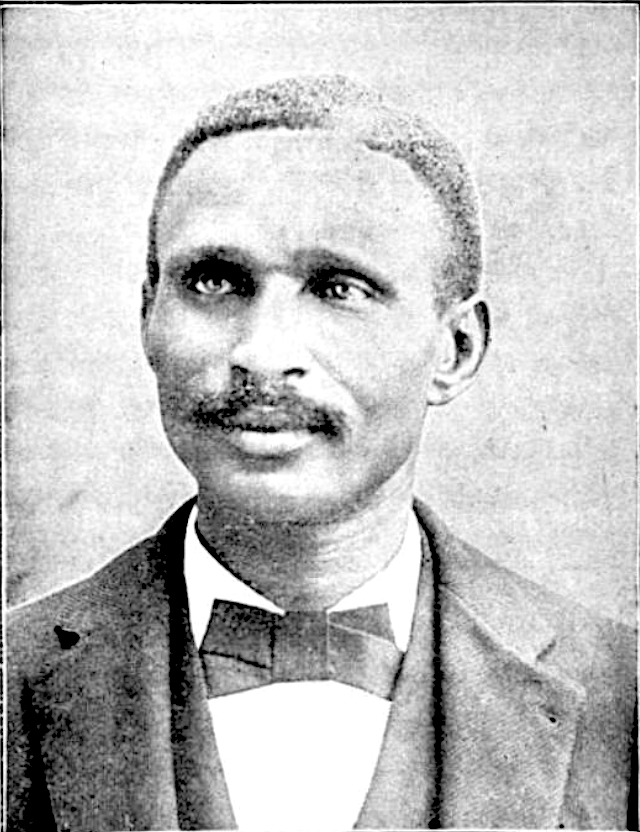
O. L. Coleman in c. 1903

In 1889, C. R. Moore donated 10 acres (4.0 ha) of land and the school was moved to the site, and occupied a frame building (the same location of present-day Gibsland-Coleman High School). In 1908, a brick school building was created.

Coleman College at its peak owned some 100 acres (40 ha), of which ten were devoted to educational purposes. There were eight buildings which included classrooms, auditorium, dormitories, and an administrative building. The college offered a choir, glee club, and intercollegiate athletics. Nicknamed the Coleman Bulldogs, Coleman College's chief athletic rival was the historically black Grambling College Tigers in Grambling in Lincoln Parish, subsequently Grambling State University. Enrollment at Coleman reached as high as four hundred in some years.

O. L. Coleman, the Coleman College founding president, died on March 8, 1927, of injuries sustained in an automobile accident in Jackson, Mississippi. After O. L. Coleman's death, his son Monroe McVicker Coleman served as president from 1927 to 1934; followed by Roy Mayfield as president from 1934 to 1937.

The college closed in Gibsland in 1937 because of the Great Depression. The site of the school in Gibsland, Louisiana was purchased by the Bienville School Distract and renamed Gibsland Colored High School (later known as Coleman High School, and then Gibsland-Coleman High School).

=== Shreveport, Louisiana ===
Later in 1943, Coleman College re-opened under the leadership of college president J. L. Crossley for another decade in Shreveport. Decreased enrollment caused the school to close once again in the mid–1950s.

Among its graduates were the first president of Southern University in Baton Rouge, Joseph Samuel Clark; and Ada Bell Lewis Coleman.

== See also ==
- John R. Marks III, great-grandson of O. L. Coleman and mayor of Tallahassee, Florida
- William Hicks (pastor), former Dean of the theology department at Coleman College
