= John McConathy =

American basketball player (1930–2016)

Personal information
- Born: April 9, 1930 Sailes, Louisiana, U.S.
- Died: April 19, 2016 (aged 86) Bossier City, Louisiana, U.S.
- Listed height: 6 ft 5 in (1.96 m)
- Listed weight: 195 lb (88 kg)

Career information
- College: Northwestern State (1947–1951)
- NBA draft: 1951: 1st round, 5th overall pick
- Drafted by: Syracuse Nationals
- Playing career: 1951–1952
- Position: Forward
- Number: 15

Career history
- 1951–1952: Milwaukee Hawks

Career highlights
- Small College All-American (1951); No. 14 retired by Northwestern State Demons

Career NBA statistics
- Points: 14 (1.3 ppg)
- Rebounds: 20 (1.8 rpg)
- Assists: 8 (0.7 apg)
- Stats at NBA.com
- Stats at Basketball Reference

John R. McConathy (April 9, 1930 – April 19, 2016) was an American professional basketball player and educator, originally from Bienville Parish in North Louisiana. McConathy was selected in the 1951 NBA draft by the Syracuse Nationals after a collegiate career at Northwestern State in Natchitoches, Louisiana, in which he was an All-American player. He played for the Milwaukee Hawks in 1951–52 and averaged 1.3 points, 1.8 rebounds and 0.7 assists per contest in 11 games.

== Background ==
McConathy was born in rural Sailes near Gibsland in Bienville Parish. He maintained a farm in Sailes.

== Career ==
McConathy competed in both basketball and track and field at Northwestern State. After graduation and his brief professional basketball career, McConathy was employed by the Bienville Parish School Board at Gibsland and Ringgold and then the Bossier Parish School Board. His Bossier High School basketball team won a state championship in 1960. He was the Bossier superintendent from 1972 to 1983. In this capacity, he was a driving force behind the establishment of Bossier Parish Community College, at which his oldest son, Mike McConathy, was the basketball coach from 1983 to 1999. Mike McConathy then became basketball coach at Northwestern State University, a position which he still fills.

After he retired as school superintendent, McConathy worked for two decades as an agent for the New York Life Insurance Company. He was a founding member of Citizens National Bank, of which he was a former board chairman for twenty-five years and remained a bank director at the time of his death.

== Personal life and death ==
McConathy was married to the former Corene Floyd (born March 1933). There are four McConathy children: coach Mike McConathy and wife Connie, of Natchitoches, Bill McConathy and wife Anne, of Haughton in south Bossier Parish, Pat McConathy and wife Suanne, of Bossier City, and Melinda McConathy Guest and husband Greg, of Bossier City, and eleven grandchildren. McConathy was an active member of the First Baptist Church of Bossier City. McConathy died in his sleep at the age of eighty-six. Pastors Brad Jurkovich of First Baptist and Justin Haigler of The Simple Church officiated on April 23 at his funeral at First Baptist Bossier. Former pastor Fred L. Lowery officiated thereafter graveside at Williamson Cemetery in Sailes, at which his parents are also interred.

== Career statistics ==
Legend
GP	Games played	GS	Games started	MPG	Minutes per game
FG%	Field goal percentage	3P%	3-point field goal percentage	FT%	Free throw percentage
RPG	Rebounds per game	APG	Assists per game	SPG	Steals per game
BPG	Blocks per game	PPG	Points per game	**Bold**	Career high

=== NBA ===
==== Regular season ====
Year	Team	GP	MPG	FG%	FT%	RPG	APG	PPG
1951–52	Milwaukee	11	9.6	.138	.429	1.8	.7	1.3
