= William Hicks (pastor) =

American Baptist pastor (1869–1954)

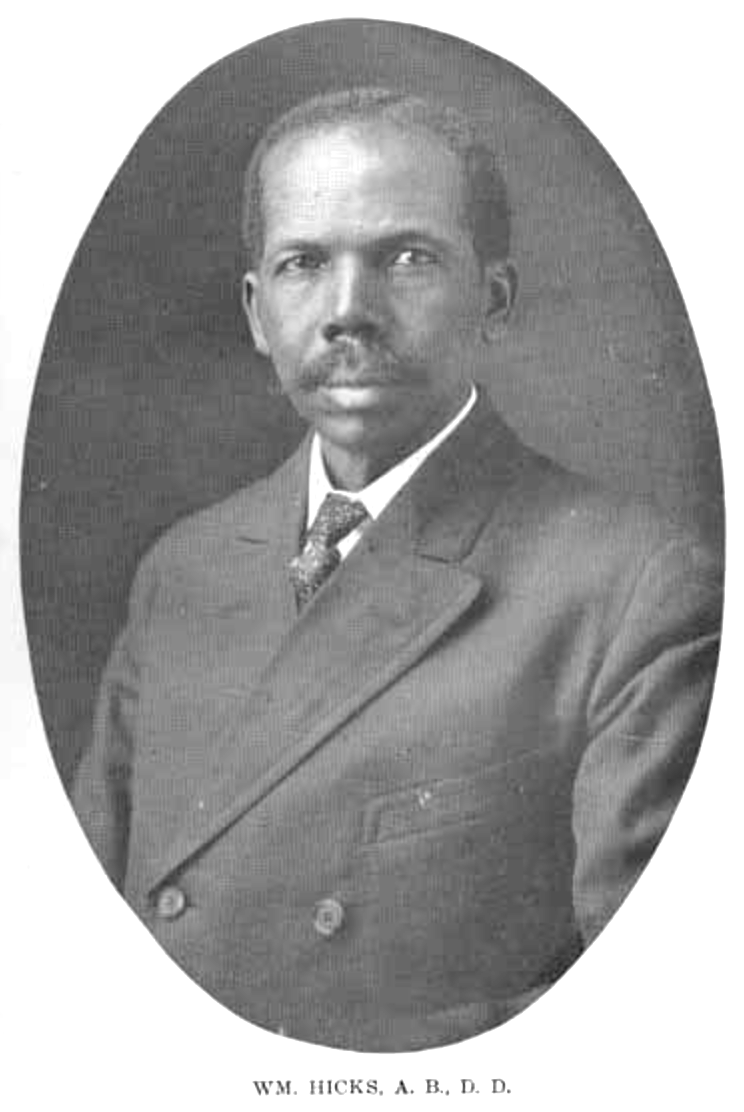
- Born: April 9, 1869; Shreveport, Louisiana, U.S.
- Died: July 18, 1954 (aged 85); Shreveport, Louisiana, U.S.
- Other names: Wm. Hicks
- Education: Leland College (BA, BD), Selma University (DD)
- Occupations: Baptist pastor, academic administrator, writer, educator
- Spouse: Olivia Josephine Madison (m. 1897–1940; her death)
- Children: 9

William Hicks (April 9, 1869 – July 18, 1954) was an American Baptist pastor, academic administrator, writer, and educator. He authored the book, History of Louisiana Negro Baptists from 1804 to 1914 published in 1915. Hicks was the founding principal of the Thirteenth District Normal and Collegiate Institute, an early school for African American students in Shreveport, Louisiana.

== Early life and education ==
William Hicks was born on April 9, 1869, in Shreveport, Louisiana, to parents Jane and Albert Square Hicks.

Hicks attended Leland College in New Orleans, Louisiana and graduated from its normal school with an equivalency to a high school diploma in 1893, a B.A. degree in c. 1902, and a B.D. degree. He received a D.D. degree in 1913, from Selma University in Selma, Alabama.

Hicks married Olivia Josephine Madison, a fellow Leland graduate, on December 27, 1897. They had nine children.

== Career ==
Hicks was ordained in 1899 at the Evergreen Baptist Church in Shreveport.

Hicks was a trustee, and a head of the efficient board of Providence Academy in Shreveport, Louisiana. It is believed to have been one of the first educational institutions for Black students in the Shreveport area. The Providence Academy's board met with the Baptist Thirteenth District executive board at the Antioch Baptist Church, and decided to dissolve Providence Academy and organize the Thirteenth District Normal and Collegiate Institute.

In Fall 1894, the Thirteenth District Normal and Collegiate Institute (also known as Shreveport Academy, and 13th District Normal and Collegiate Institute) in Shreveport was founded by Hicks, as a successor to Providence Academy. Hicks served as the founding school principal. In 1925, the Thirteenth District Normal and Collegiate Institute closed.

Hicks briefly served as the Dean of the theological department at Coleman College in Gibsland, Louisiana.

Hicks served as a traveling pastor in Atlanta, Texas, and Junction City, Arkansas. For two years he pastored at El Bethel Baptist Church in Meridian, Mississippi. He also pastored in Uniontown, Alabama.

Hicks wrote for the National Baptist Sunday-School Teacher, the National Baptist Union-Review, and for the National Baptist Sunday-School Congress, which was formed from approximately 14,000 Sunday schools.

In the end of his life, Hicks served as an international missionary with the National Baptist Convention. Hicks died on July 18, 1954, in Shreveport.

== Writings ==
- Hicks, William (August 2, 1908). Bible Thoughts: With Questions and Answers. Nashville, Tennessee: National Baptist Publishing Board.
- Hicks, William (1915). History of Louisiana Negro Baptists from 1804 to 1914. Nashville, Tennessee: National Baptist Publishing Board.
- Hicks, William (1947). Things Essential for the Successful Preacher, Deacon and Layman to Know.
