= Sylvan Retreat =

Historic house in Louisiana, United States

- U.S. National Register of Historic Places
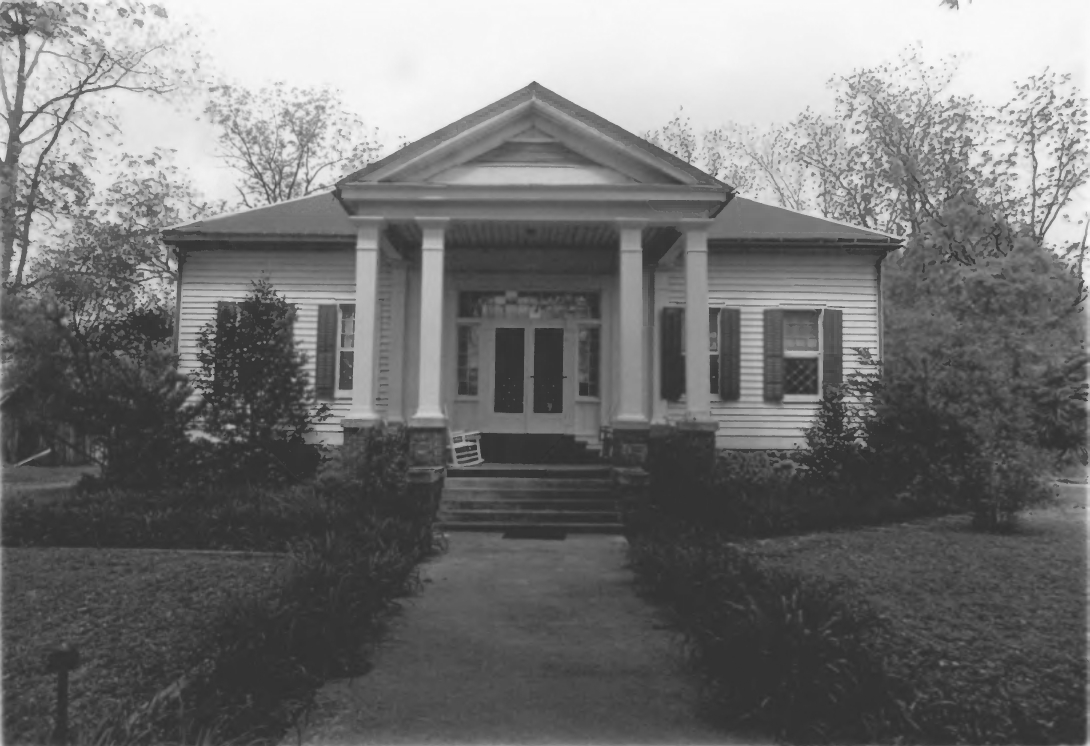

- Location within Louisiana
- Location: 2935 Mount Lebanon Street, Gibsland, Louisiana
- Coordinates: 32°32′58″N 93°03′17″W
- Area: 5 acres (2.0 ha)
- Built: 1848
- Built by: William George Walker
- Architectural style: Greek Revival, Raised plantation house
- NRHP reference No.: 79001053
- Added to NRHP: December 6, 1979

Sylvan Retreat, also known as the J. H. Pumphrey Home, is a historic raised former plantation house at 610 N. 3rd Street in Gibsland in Bienville Parish, Louisiana. It was built in 1848 by William George Walker in another location, and was moved into Giblsland in 1884. It was listed on the National Register of Historic Places in 1979.

It was built as a five-bay Greek Revival raised plantation house, with wood frame built of virgin cypress joined by mortises and pinned with wooden pegs. It had a front gallery and a hip roof. All doors and window sashes were cut on site and assembled with wooden pegs. It included five 17 by 20 feet (5.2 m × 6.1 m) rooms and a 12 by 35 feet (3.7 m × 10.7 m) central hall, with 15 feet (4.6 m) ceilings. It had front and rear galleries plus a separated kitchen.

It was altered in 1884 by moving it to Gibsland, by combining four exterior fireplaces, and by reducing the front gallery to a four-column portico.

== See also ==
- National Register of Historic Places listings in Bienville Parish, Louisiana
