= McConathy =

McConathy is a surname. Notable people with the surname include:

- John McConathy (1930–2016), American basketball player, coach and educator
- Mike McConathy (born 1955), American basketball coach
