= LA 11 =

LA 11, LA-11, La-11 or LA11 may refer to:

- Lavochkin La-11, a Cold War-era Soviet fighter aircraft
- LA11, a postcode district in South Cumbria within the LA postcode area
- Louisiana's 11th State Senate district, a state senate district representing the northern parts of Greater New Orleans in St. Tammany and Tangipahoa Parishes along Lake Pontchartrain
- Louisiana's 11th House of Representatives District, a district in the Louisiana House of Representatives representing parts of Bienville, Claiborne and Lincoln Parishes
- Los Angeles City Council District 11, representing the Westside of the city to the Pacific Ocean
- Constituency LA-11, a constituency of the Azad Jammu and Kashmir Legislative Assembly in Pakistan
