= Philip H. Mecom =

American lawyer (1889-1969)

Philip Henry Mecom

United States Attorney for the Western District of Louisiana
- In office 1922–1935
- President: Warren G. Harding; Calvin Coolidge; Herbert Hoover; Franklin D. Roosevelt
- Preceded by: Hugh C. Fisher
- Succeeded by: Benjamin F. Roberts

Personal details
- Born: Philip Henry Mecom; May 13, 1889 Bienville Parish, Louisiana, U.S.
- Died: April 1, 1969 (aged 79) Shreveport, Louisiana
- Spouse(s): Viola Virginia Pullen; Minnie Grace Brown
- Children: 1
- Education: Louisiana State University (Bachelor); Tulane Law School (JD)
- Nickname: Pat

Philip Henry Mecom (1889–1969) was an American lawyer from Arcadia, Louisiana. He served as United States Attorney for the Western District of Louisiana under four presidents.

== Childhood ==
Philip Henry Mecom was born on May 13, 1889, to William and Carol Mecom in Arcadia, Louisiana. He was the youngest of 11 siblings and was orphaned at the young age of 13 having two of his older brothers raise him from that point on. He would go on to be educated at Louisiana State University and Tulane Law School.

== US Attorney ==
Philip and Virginia Mecom moved to Shreveport from New Orleans in 1921 when he was appointed assistant U.S. attorney for the Western District of Louisiana. The following year he moved up to become U.S. attorney, a position he held until 1935, when he resigned to resume his private law practice.

=== Cases ===
Known cases include:

- United States v. Norvel
- United States v. Hosier
- United States v. Looney
- Oden v. United States
