= Wayside Inn (Gibsland, Louisiana) =

- U.S. National Register of Historic Places
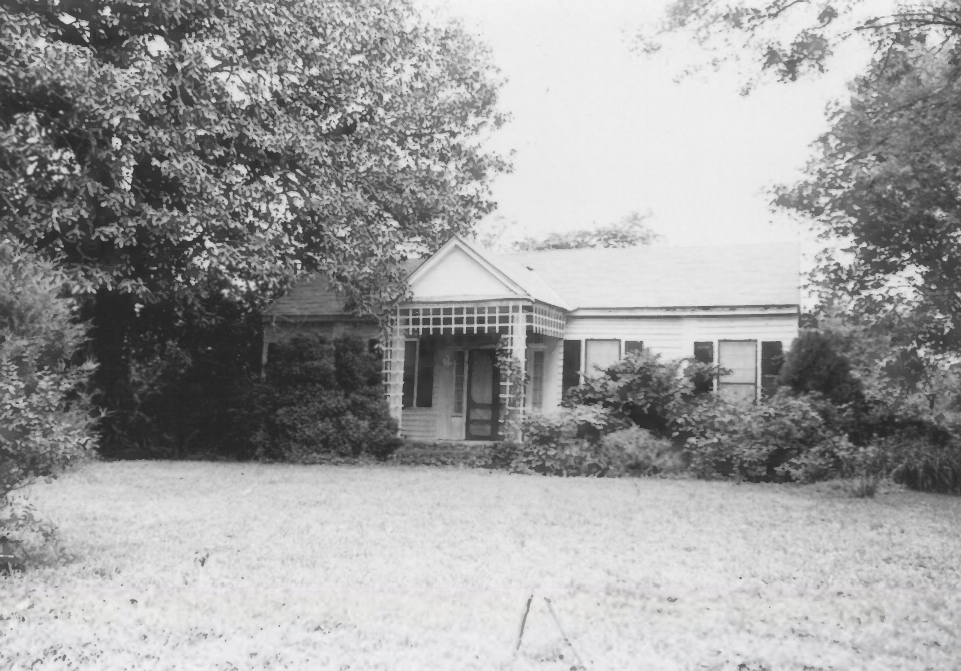

- Location within Louisiana
- Location: On Louisiana Highway 154, about 286 yards (262 m) north of the intersection with Louisiana Highway 517
- Nearest city: Gibsland, Louisiana
- Coordinates: 32°30′21″N 93°03′00″W
- Area: 0.5 acres (0.20 ha)
- Built: 1857
- Architectural style: Greek Revival
- MPS: Antebellum Greek Revival Buildings of Mount Lebanon TR
- NRHP reference No.: 80001706
- Added to NRHP: February 1, 1980

The Wayside Inn located on Louisiana Highway 154 near Gibsland, Louisiana was built in 1857. It was listed on the National Register of Historic Places in 1980.

It is a five-bay residence with the only pedimented entrance portico in the community. It was built by Reverend Jesse Hartwell, who was president of Mt. Lebanon University from 1858 to 1859.

== See also ==
- National Register of Historic Places listings in Bienville Parish, Louisiana
