= Down House (Gibsland, Louisiana) =

Historic house in Louisiana, United States

- U.S. National Register of Historic Places
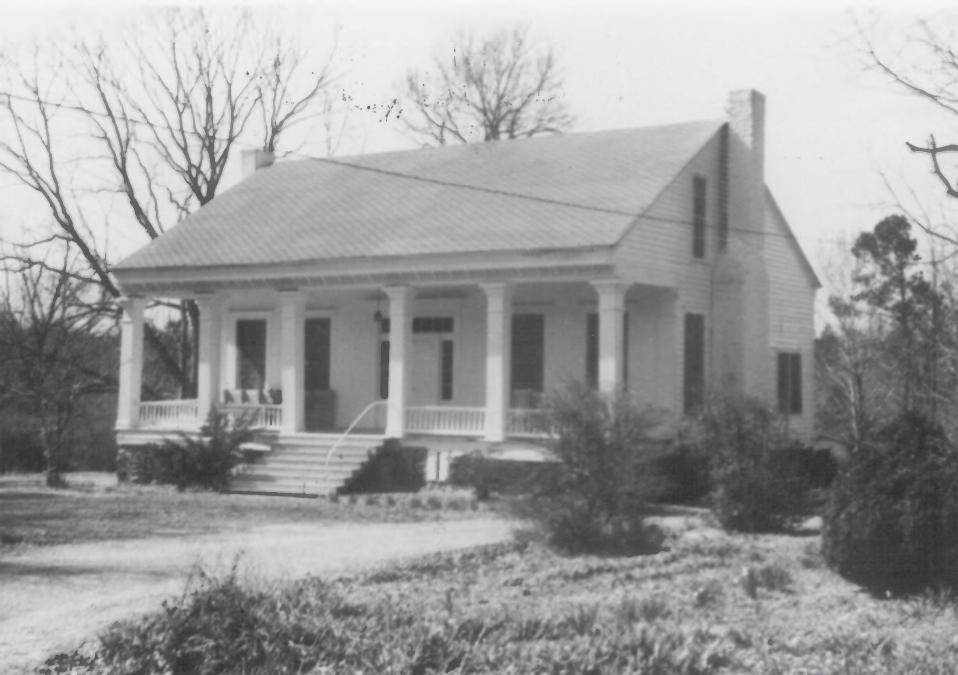

- Location within Louisiana
- Location: On Louisiana Highway 154, about 700 yards (640 m) west of intersection with Louisiana Highway 517
- Nearest city: Gibsland, Louisiana
- Coordinates: 32°30′04″N 93°03′20″W
- Area: 0.5 acres (0.20 ha)
- Built: 1852–53
- Architectural style: Greek Revival
- MPS: Antebellum Greek Revival Buildings of Mount Lebanon TR
- NRHP reference No.: 80001701
- Added to NRHP: February 1, 1980

The Down House, located on Louisiana Highway 154 near Gibsland in Bienville Parish, Louisiana, is a Greek Revival-style house built in 1852–53. It was listed on the National Register of Historic Places in 1980.

It is a five-bay house with a front gallery. Its NRHP nomination states its significance: "This building, because of its cornices over the fenestration and its full molded Doric pillars, is the most classically correct and fully developed example of a Greek Revival residence in the area."
