= Arcadia–Bienville Parish Airport =

- IATA: none; ICAO: none; FAA LID: 5F0

Summary
- Airport type: Public
- Owner: City of Arcadia
- Serves: Arcadia, Louisiana
- Elevation AMSL: 440 ft (130 m)
- Coordinates: 32°31′56″N 092°57′10″W
- Interactive map of Arcadia–Bienville Parish Airport

Runways
Direction	Length		Surface
Direction	ft	m	Surface
14/32	3,000	914	Asphalt

Statistics (2018)
- Aircraft operations (year ending 10/31/2018): 8,400
- Based aircraft: 5
- Source: Federal Aviation Administration

Arcadia–Bienville Parish Airport (FAA LID: 5F0) is a public-use airport located two nautical miles (2.3 mi; 3.7 km) southwest of the central business district of Arcadia, in Bienville Parish, Louisiana, United States. It is owned by the City of Arcadia.

== Facilities and aircraft ==
Arcadia–Bienville Parish Airport covers an area of 20 acres (8.1 ha) at an elevation of 440 feet (130 m) above mean sea level. It has one runway designated 14/32 with an asphalt surface measuring 3,000 by 75 feet (914 by 23 m).

For the 12-month period ending October 31, 2018, the airport had 8,400 general aviation aircraft operations, an average of 23 per day. At that time there were five single-engine aircraft based at this airport.

== See also ==
- List of airports in Louisiana
