= Wayside Inn (Arlington, Massachusetts) =

Historic house in Massachusetts, United States

- U.S. National Register of Historic Places
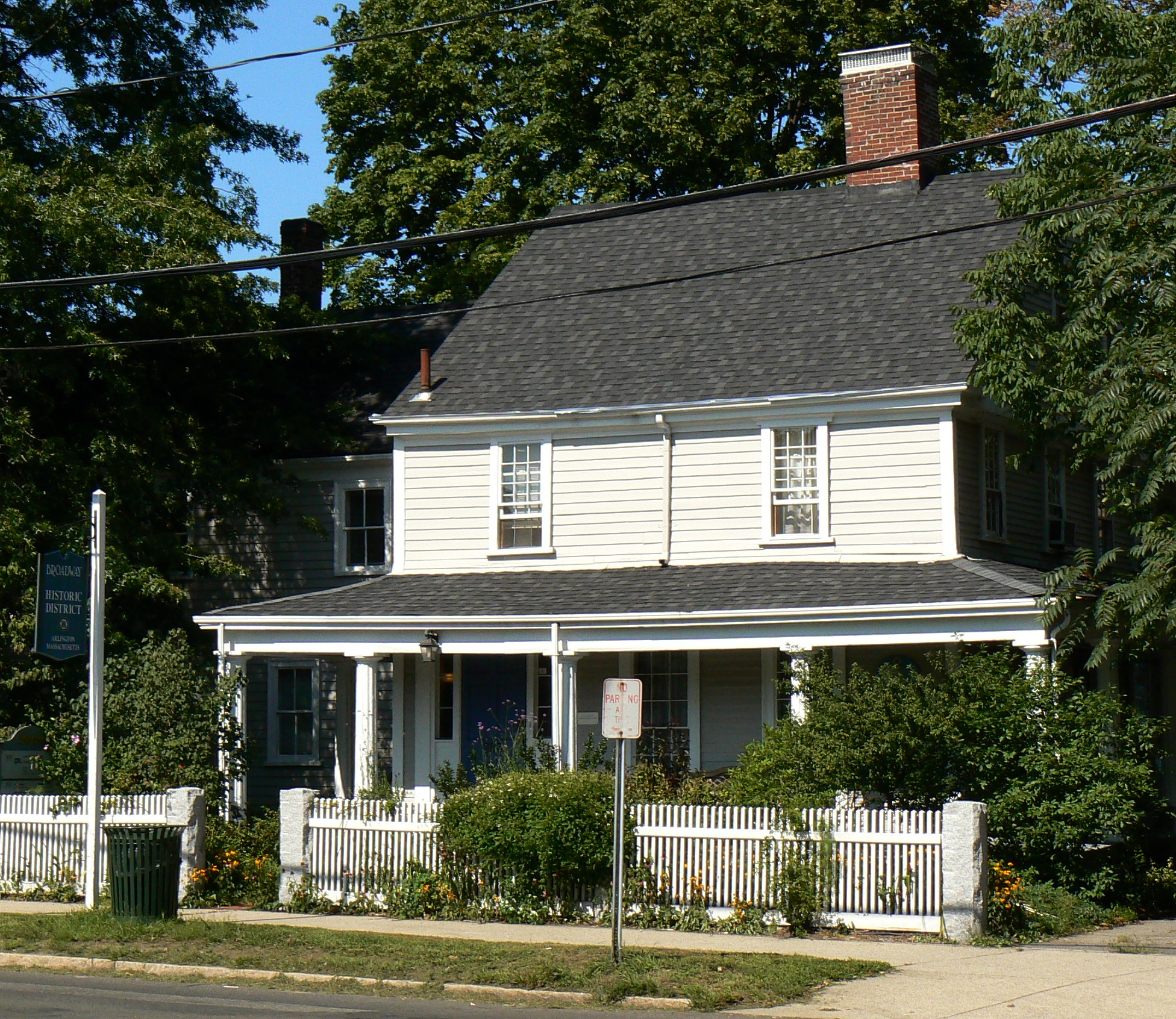
- A photo of the structure, taken in 2008

- Location within Massachusetts Location within the United States
- Location: 393 Massachusetts Avenue, Arlington, Massachusetts
- Coordinates: 42°24′46″N 71°8′59″W
- Architectural style: Greek Revival, Georgian
- MPS: Arlington MRA
- NRHP reference No.: 85002690
- Added to NRHP: September 27, 1985

The Wayside Inn, once known as the Cutter House, is a historic house in Arlington, Massachusetts. The house was built circa 1750 in a simple Georgian style, and is the only half-house of that period still extant in Arlington. The house may have been used as stagecoach stop; it was owned in the 19th century by Philip Whittemore, who also owned a hotel nearer the center. The name "Wayside Inn" was not applied to the building until the 20th century.

The house was listed on the National Register of Historic Places in 1985.

== See also ==
- National Register of Historic Places listings in Arlington, Massachusetts
