= Patrick O. Jefferson =

American politician (born 1968)

Patrick O'Neal Jefferson

Louisiana State Representative for District 11 (Bienville, Claiborne, and Lincoln parishes)
- In office January 9, 2012 – January 8, 2024
- Preceded by: Rick Gallot
- Succeeded by: Rashid Armand Young

Personal details
- Born: November 18, 1968 (age 57) Bahamas
- Party: Democratic
- Education: Dillard University; Ohio State University College of Law
- Occupation: Attorney

Patrick O'Neal Jefferson (born November 18, 1968) was a Democratic member of the Louisiana House of Representatives for the 11th district, which includes Bienville, Claiborne, and Lincoln parishes. Jefferson is an attorney in private practice in Arcadia, Louisiana.

Jefferson graduated in 1990 from the historically black Dillard University in New Orleans.

Jefferson ran unopposed for reelection to the House in the October 24, 2015, primary election.

Louisiana House of Representatives
Preceded by Rick Gallot	Louisiana State Representative for District 11 (Bienville, Claiborne, and Lincoln parishes); 2012&ndash2024;	Succeeded by Rashid Armand Young
