= Arcadia High School (Louisiana) =

Location
- 967 Daniel Street; Arcadia, (Bienville Parish), Louisiana 71001; United States; 32.5553°N 92.9075°W

Information
- School district: Bienville Parish School Board
- Teaching staff: 31.10 (FTE)
- Enrollment: 263 (2023-2024)
- Student to teacher ratio: 8.46
- Colors: Black and gold
- Mascot: Hornets
- Yearbook: Hornet
- Communities served: Arcadia
- Website: www.bpsb.us/o/ahs/

Arcadia High School is a public school in Arcadia, Louisiana, United States that offers classes through grades 6-12. It is a part of Bienville Parish School Board.

As of the 2015–2016 school year, the school had 296 students, with 95% of them being classified as low income.

== History ==
Professor John H. Davidson became the principal on July 28, 1903. He originated from Junction City, Louisiana.

On September 3, 1907, the school had 300 students.

In 1922, the voters of Arcadia passed a $100,000 bond to build another school building on a 76%-22% basis.

The school auditorium and gymnasium building was destroyed by a fire in October 1973; the junior high school building was salvaged by firefighters and the senior high school did not get damaged. The athletic trophies dating from 1947 were destroyed. A bond for establishing a new school complex for Arcadia High was scheduled for January 15, 1974. The bond passed, and the school district announced it would spend $2 million for that building; the money came from revenue bonds funded by sales taxes and from a $160,000 insurance settlement on the previous building.

== Athletics ==
Arcadia High athletics competes in the LHSAA.

=== Championships ===
Football championships

- (2) State Championships: 1940, 1965

== Notable people ==
- Marcus Fizer (Class of 1997) - NBA player
- Rush Wimberly - Louisiana state legislature
