= Castor High School =

Public school in Castor, Louisiana

Coordinates: 32.2509°N 93.1661°W

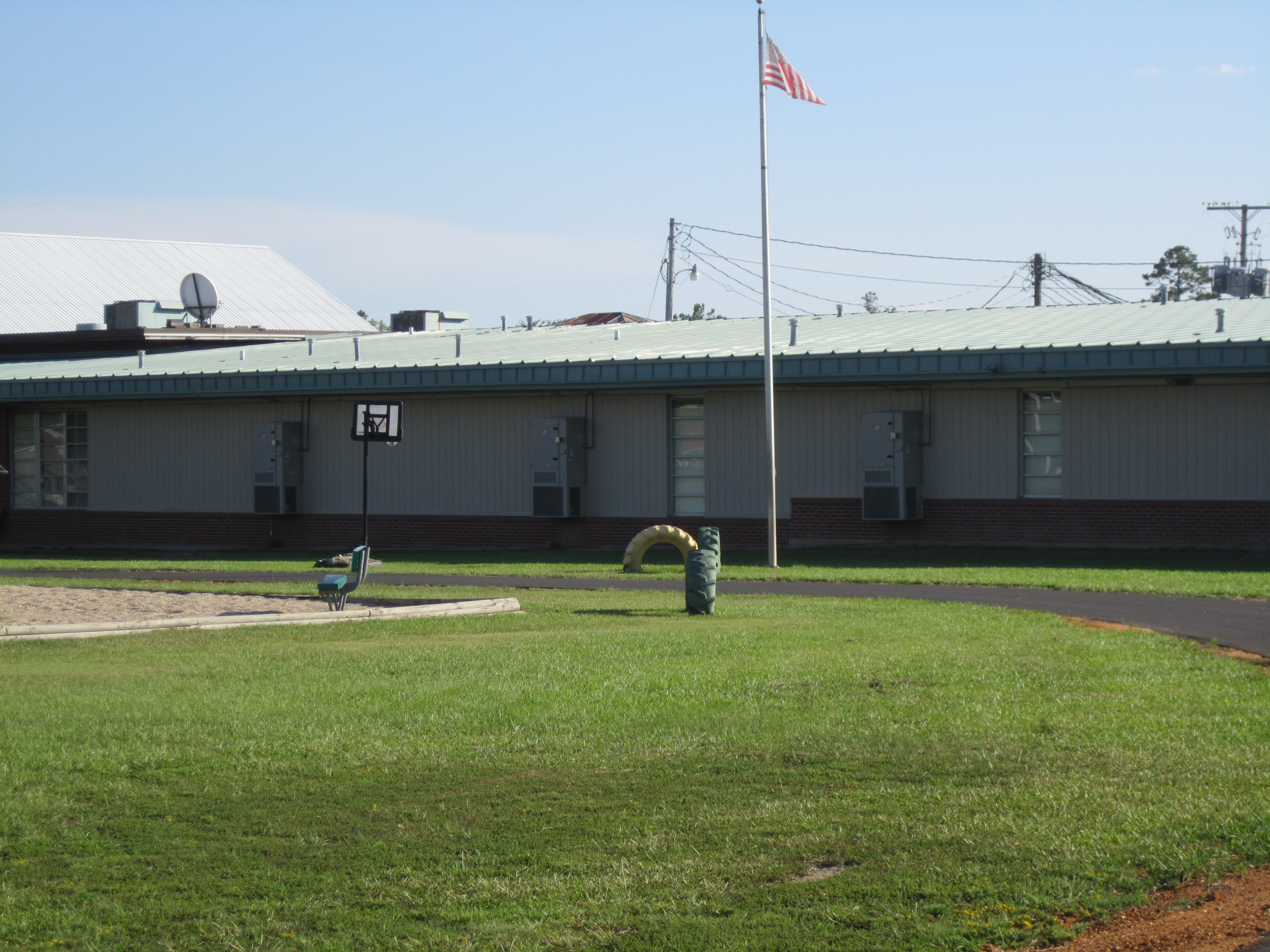
- 140 Front Street, Castor, Louisiana, U.S.

Information
- Locale: Rural
- School district: Bienville Parish School Board
- NCES District ID: 2200210
- NCES School ID: 220021000092
- Grades: pre-K to 12th
- Enrollment: 1,948 (2023)
- Student to teacher ratio: 9.57 (2023)
- Colors: Green and gold
- Mascot: Tigers
- Website: www.bpsb.us/o/chs

Castor High School (CHS) is an American public school for grades pre-K to 12th, located on 140 Front Street in Castor, Louisiana. It is part of the Bienville Parish School Board.

== History ==
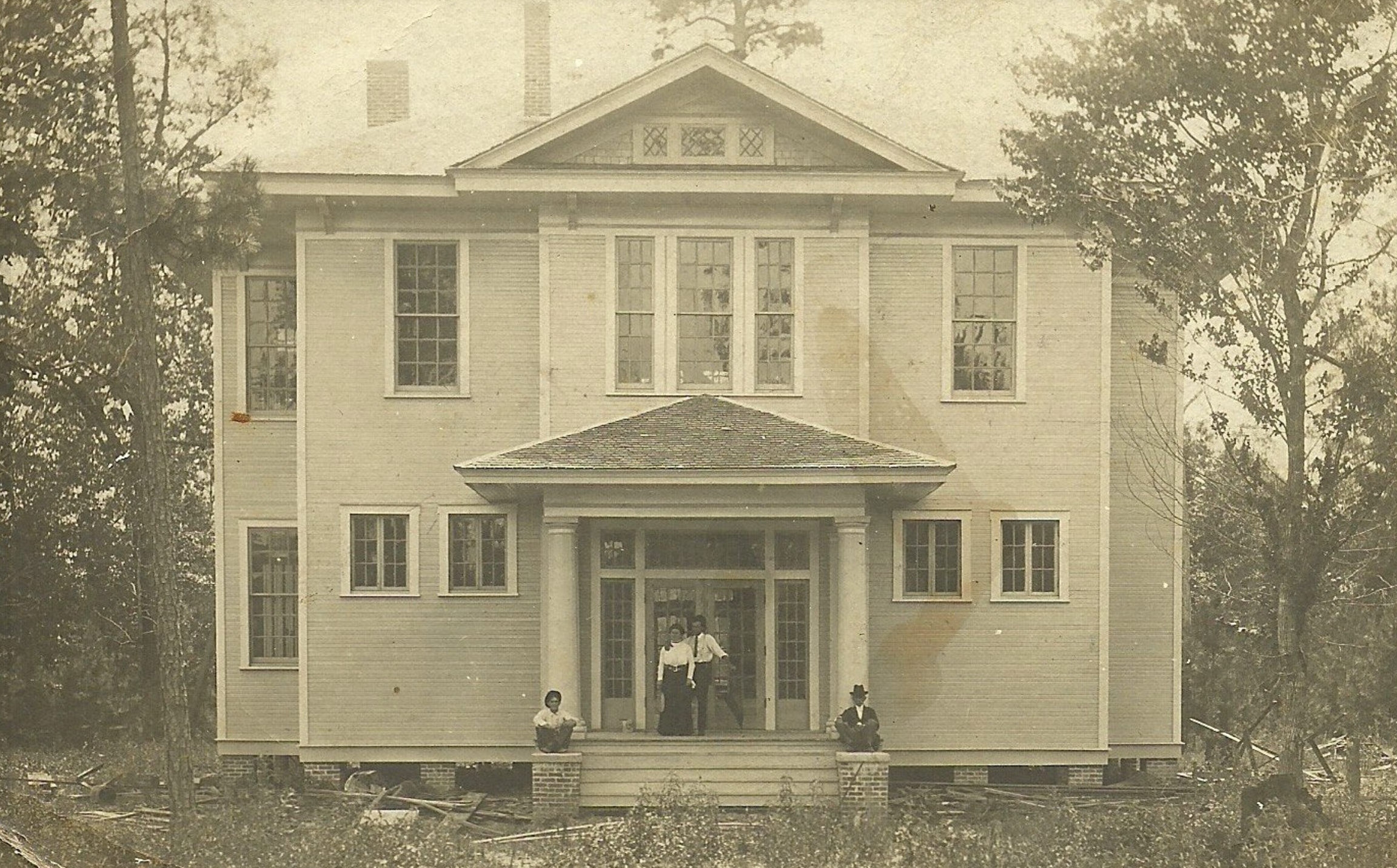
Old Castor High School (circa 1910–1920)

In the 1910s, the McMichael's Company built the first Castor High School building in Castor, Louisiana. W.M. Caskey was the founding principal. In January 1923, the school's two buildings burned down, and were rebuilt starting in July of the same year.

The Giddens twins were multi-sport athletes at the school, and state champions in a relay track event in 2019. In 2019, Gayle Benson who owns the New Orleans Saints and New Orleans Pelicans teams, donated money to the school for repairs and remodel. In 2019, the school experienced a false bomb threat.

In 2023, it had an enrollment of 1,971 students, 89.5% of whom were white.

== Alumni ==
- Lee Smith (born 1957), baseball pitcher in the Hall of Fame

== See also ==
- List of high schools in Louisiana
