= Rashid Armand Young =

American politician

Rashid Young

Member of the Louisiana House of Representatives from the 11th district
- Incumbent
- Assumed office January 8, 2024
- Preceded by: Patrick Jefferson

Personal details
- Party: Democratic
- Education: Arkansas Baptist College (BS); Southern University Law Center (JD)

Rashid Armand Young is an American politician serving as a member of the Louisiana House of Representatives from the 11th district, representing Bienville Parish, Claiborne Parish, and Lincoln Parish. He assumed office on January 8, 2024.

== Career ==
Young is an attorney based in Homer, Louisiana. He was elected to the 11th district seat in the Louisiana House of Representatives in 2023 after running unopposed.
