= Ringgold High School (Louisiana) =

Location
- 4044 Bienville Road, Suite B Ringgold, (Bienville Parish), Louisiana 71068; United States; 32.3227°N 93.2683°W

Information
- Type: Public high school
- School district: Bienville Parish School Board
- Principal: Marchello Gates
- Staff: 20.85 (FTE)
- Enrollment: 249 (2023-2024)
- Student to teacher ratio: 11.94
- Colors: Red and white
- Mascot: Redskins
- Website: www.bpsb.us/o/rihs

Ringgold High School is a 6–12 school in unincorporated Bienville Parish, Louisiana, United States, near Ringgold. It is a part of the Bienville Parish School Board.

As of 2015 the school had 253 students.

The school consists of 48% female and 52% male students with a graduation rate of 73%.

== Athletics ==
Ringgold High athletics competes in the LHSAA.

== Notable alumni ==
- Wimpy Giddens - former NFL player
