= Ringgold, Louisiana =

- Town
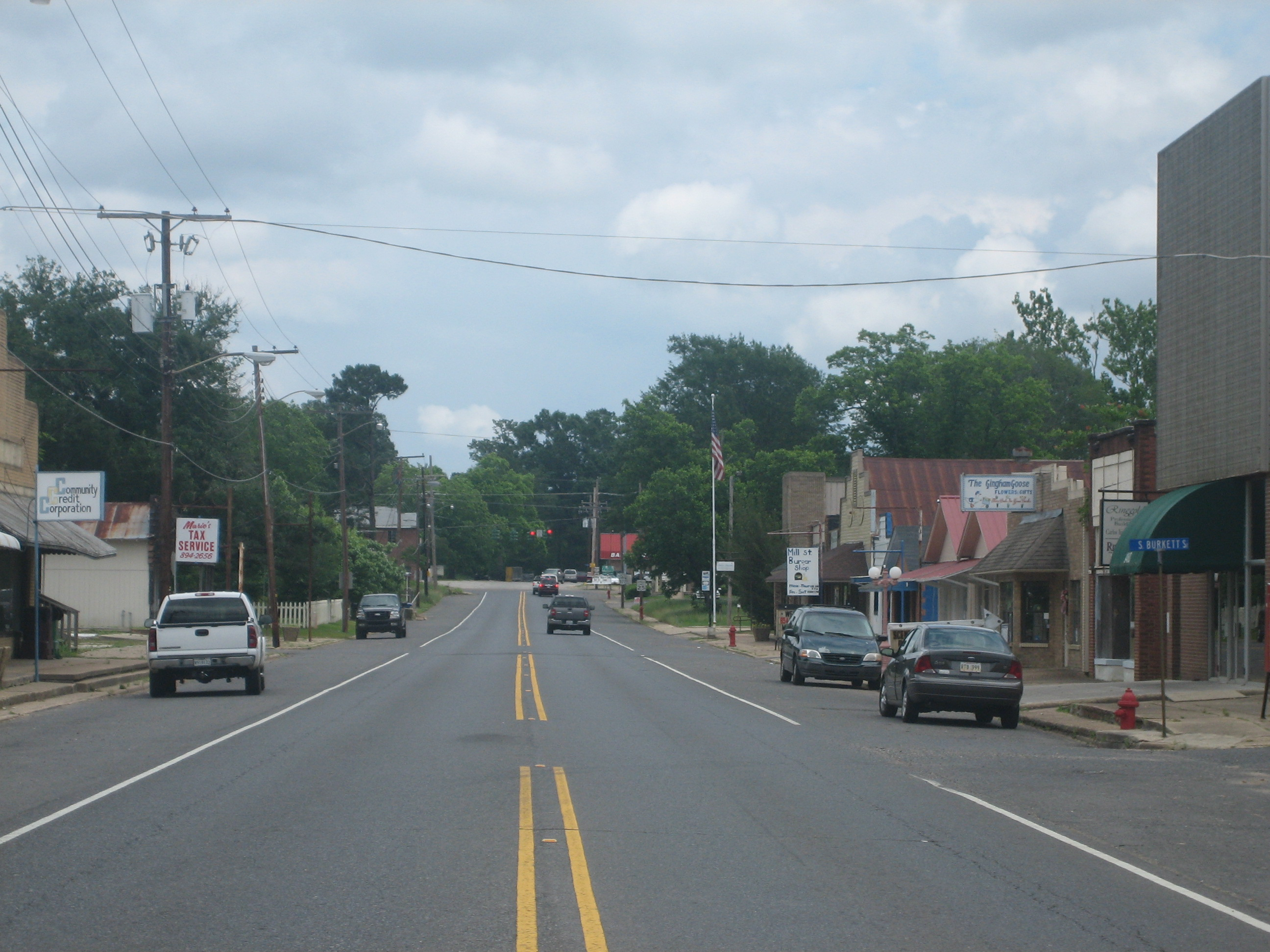
- Downtown Ringgold

- Seal

- Location in Bienville Parish, Louisiana

- Location of Louisiana in the United States
- Coordinates: 32°19′34″N 93°17′01″W
- Country: United States
- State: Louisiana
- Parish: Bienville

Area
  - Total: 2.32 sq mi (6.01 km^{2})
  - Land: 2.32 sq mi (6.00 km^{2})
  - Water: 0.0039 sq mi (0.01 km^{2})
- Elevation: 269 ft (82 m)

Population (2020)
  - Total: 1,379
  - Rank: BV: 2nd
  - Density: 595.6/sq mi (229.96/km^{2})
- Time zone: UTC-6 (CST)
  - Summer (DST): UTC-5 (CDT)
- ZIP code: 71068
- Area code: 318
- FIPS code: 22-64905
- GNIS feature ID: 2407221

Ringgold is a town in the U.S. state of Louisiana, in the western half of Bienville Parish. The town of Ringgold is named for United States Army Major Samuel Ringgold. As of the 2020 census, Ringgold had a population of 1,379. It is the second largest incorporated municipality in Bienville Parish by population.

== History ==
In 1690, the Ringgold area was explored by the scout Domingo Terán de los Ríos, whom the government of Mexico sent to determine the extent of the holdings of the Caddo Indians. He was considered the first white leader to sight what became the man-made Lake Bistineau. A priest with the expedition, Father Masinettes, established "Mission Loretteto." De los Rios was thereafter from 1891 to 1892 the first governor of Spanish Texas.

In November 1933, C. E. Tomme, a telephone executive who was previously a county commissioner of Newton County in East Texas, was appointed mayor of Ringgold by Governor Oscar K. Allen. Tomme, who relocated to Ringgold in 1920, filled the position vacated by his fellow Democrat, Walter McDowell. Tomme previously served on the Bienville Parish School Board and the parish Democratic Executive Committee. In the spring of 1934, Tomme won election to the post, 86-66, over Dave Thomas.

In 1933, African American Nelson Nash was lynched and hung in the town.

Ringgold became the home of a Southland Christian Ministries camp and retreat located on a 23-acre lake off U.S. Route 371 north of the community. Initially constructed during the early 1940s by the United States Army Corps of Engineers, the facility was purchased in the middle 1940s by the Bible Memory Association, which then operated "Miracle Camp" until it was closed for financial reasons in the early 1990s. Southland subsequently obtained the property with help of the Tri-City Baptist Church of Independence, Missouri.

On May 2, 1984, a tornado devastated part of Ringgold. Nine were injured, though there were no deaths. The storm reached as far as nearby Jamestown. On March 25, 2017, the Ringgold Assembly of God Church was destroyed in a tornado. There were no injuries.

In 2018, the town of Ringgold was highlighted in the media for drug activity, citing lack of economic growth. Since then, the Mayor Milton Vining Administration has collaborated with the local community in an effort to reduce poverty and drugs, and attract local businesses.

During the COVID-19 pandemic in the United States, Ringgold's government enforced a curfew, and local African American student Antavion Moore became Louisiana's Student of the Year from 2019-2020.

== Geography ==
Ringgold is located in western Bienville Parish. According to the United States Census Bureau, the town has a total area of 2.3 square miles (6.0 km^{2}), all land. Common among rural North Louisiana communities, the town of Ringgold is surrounded by forests and prairie. Ringgold lies approximately 24 miles west of Driskill Mountain.

== Demographics ==
Historical population
Census	Pop.	Note	%±
1880	133		—
1920	335		—
1930	618		84.5%
1940	1,006		62.8%
1950	1,007		0.1%
1960	953		−5.4%
1970	1,731		81.6%
1980	1,655		−4.4%
1990	1,856		12.1%
2000	1,660		−10.6%
2010	1,495		−9.9%
2020	1,379		−7.8%
2025 (est.)	1,314	▼	−4.7%
U.S. Decennial Census

Ringgold racial composition
Race	Number	Percentage
White (non-Hispanic)	478	34.66%
Black or African American (non-Hispanic)	785	56.93%
Native American	7	0.51%
Other/Mixed	84	6.09%
Hispanic or Latino	25	1.81%

Since the downturn of the lumber and oil industry, Ringgold has struggled with a declining population. According to the 2020 United States census, there were 1,379 people, 605 households, and 414 families residing in the town. Per the 2018 American Community Survey, there were 764 total housing units and 605 occupied housing units. At the census of 2000, there were 1,660 people, 636 households, and 410 families residing in the town. The population density was 715.3 inhabitants per square mile (276.2/km^{2}). There were 749 housing units at an average density of 322.8 per square mile (124.6/km^{2}).

In 2018, the median income in the town was $19,475 and the mean income was $31,650. Ringgold had a median rent of $415 from 2014-2018. The U.S. Census Bureau estimated approximately 46.5% of the population lived at or below the poverty line. Approximately 8.0% of the population had a bachelor's degree or higher, and the town had a 36.5% employment rate. The median income for a household in the town was $15,326 in 2000, and the median income for a family was $21,563. Males had a median income of $25,000 versus $15,625 for females. The per capita income for the town was $9,817. About 36.5% of families and 38.4% of the population were below the poverty line, including 48.9% of those under age 18 and 33.3% of those age 65 or over.

Of the 636 households in 2000, out of which 32.4% had children under the age of 18 living with them, 34.4% were married couples living together, 26.3% had a female householder with no husband present, and 35.4% were non-families. A tabulated 32.1% of all households were made up of individuals, and 17.0% had someone living alone who was 65 years of age or older. The average household size was 2.49 and the average family size was 3.13. In the town, the population was spread out, with 28.9% under the age of 18, 8.9% from 18 to 24, 21.1% from 25 to 44, 21.6% from 45 to 64, and 19.6% who were 65 years of age or older. The median age was 37 years. For every 100 females, there were 77.7 males. For every 100 females age 18 and over, there were 68.0 males.

In 2018, the racial makeup of the town in 2018 was 35.0% White (34.2% non-Hispanic white), 63.7% Black or African American, 0.4% American Indian or Alaska Native, and 1.7% from two or more races. Ringgold had an average of 72.7 males per 100 females aged 18 and older, and 49.1 males per 100 females aged 65 and older. At the 2000 census, the racial makeup of the town was 43.92% White, 55.30% African American, 0.30% Native American, 0.06% Asian, and 0.42% from two or more races. Hispanics or Latinos of any race were 0.54% of the population. Since 2020, there has been a predominant Black or African American population, followed by non-Hispanic whites.

According to Sperling's BestPlaces, roughly 75% of the local population are religious, with Christianity being the dominant religion. The largest Christian group in Ringgold are Baptists, spread among the Southern Baptist Convention, independent Baptist churches, and the Progressive National Baptist Convention. Hebrew Missionary Baptist Church is the founding headquarters of the Louisiana Progressive Baptist State Convention, established by Henry F. Johnson, Jr. Methodists were the second largest, dominated by the United Methodist Church, followed by Catholics and other Christians.

== Economy ==
Ringgold was once a bustling small town, but since the beginning of the 21st century it was known for illegal drug activity and poverty. Since Operation Meltdown, the election of Milton Vining and Freddie Peterson, and a new city council, the town worked to reduce poverty, drugs, crime, and attract local business. As of 2020, the town's economy is stimulated by convenience stores, banks and small businesses.

== Media ==
The Ringgold area is primarily served by The Bienville Democrat newspaper, headquartered in the parish seat Arcadia. Ringgold lies within the Shreveport–Bossier City metropolitan area's media market.

== Education ==
Bienville Parish School Board operates the following public schools in Ringgold:

- Ringgold Elementary School
- Ringgold High School (grades 6-12)

== Notable people ==
- John Thurman Hunter Jr. (1931 - 2016; stage name Long John Hunter), blues guitarist, was born in Ringgold.
- Billy McCormack, director and vice president of the Christian Coalition of America
- Garnie W. McGinty, Louisiana historian.
