= Bienville Parish School Board =

School district in Louisiana, United States

Coordinates: 32°32′58″N 92°55′17″W

Location
- 1956 First Street, Arcadia, Bienville Parish, Louisiana, United States

District information
- Grades: K-12

Bienville Parish School Board (BPSB) is a school district headquartered in Arcadia, Louisiana, United States and serves Bienville Parish.

In 2012 the superintendent replaced the principals of five of the district's eight schools after encountering poor test scores. KTBS described the move as "the largest leadership change in forty years" for the school system. The district had 2012 test scores worse than that of 2011, and was one of three parishes in northwest Louisiana to have this scenario. Around 2012 it was 50th of out all of the Louisiana parish school systems.

== Schools ==
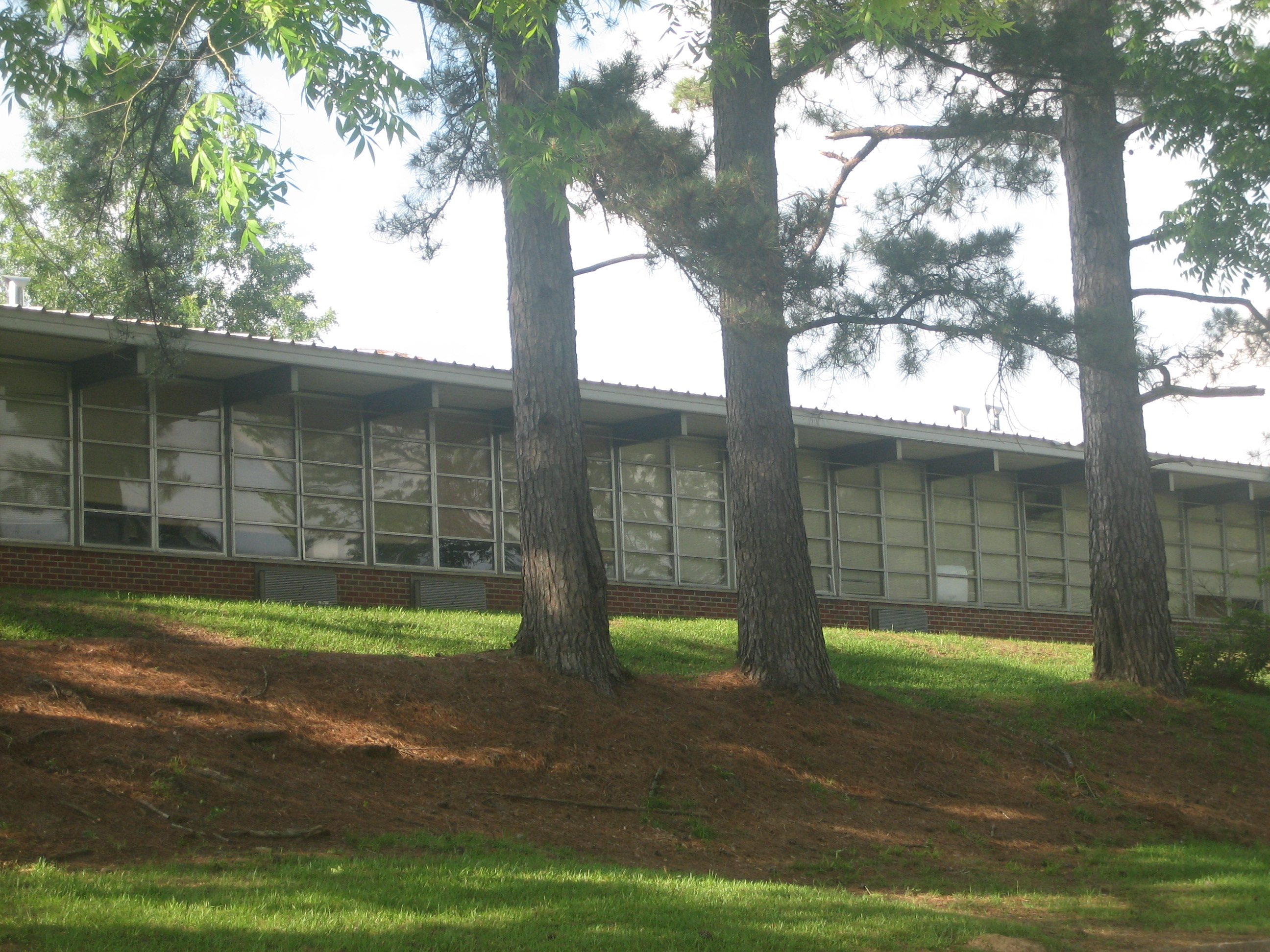
Bienville School

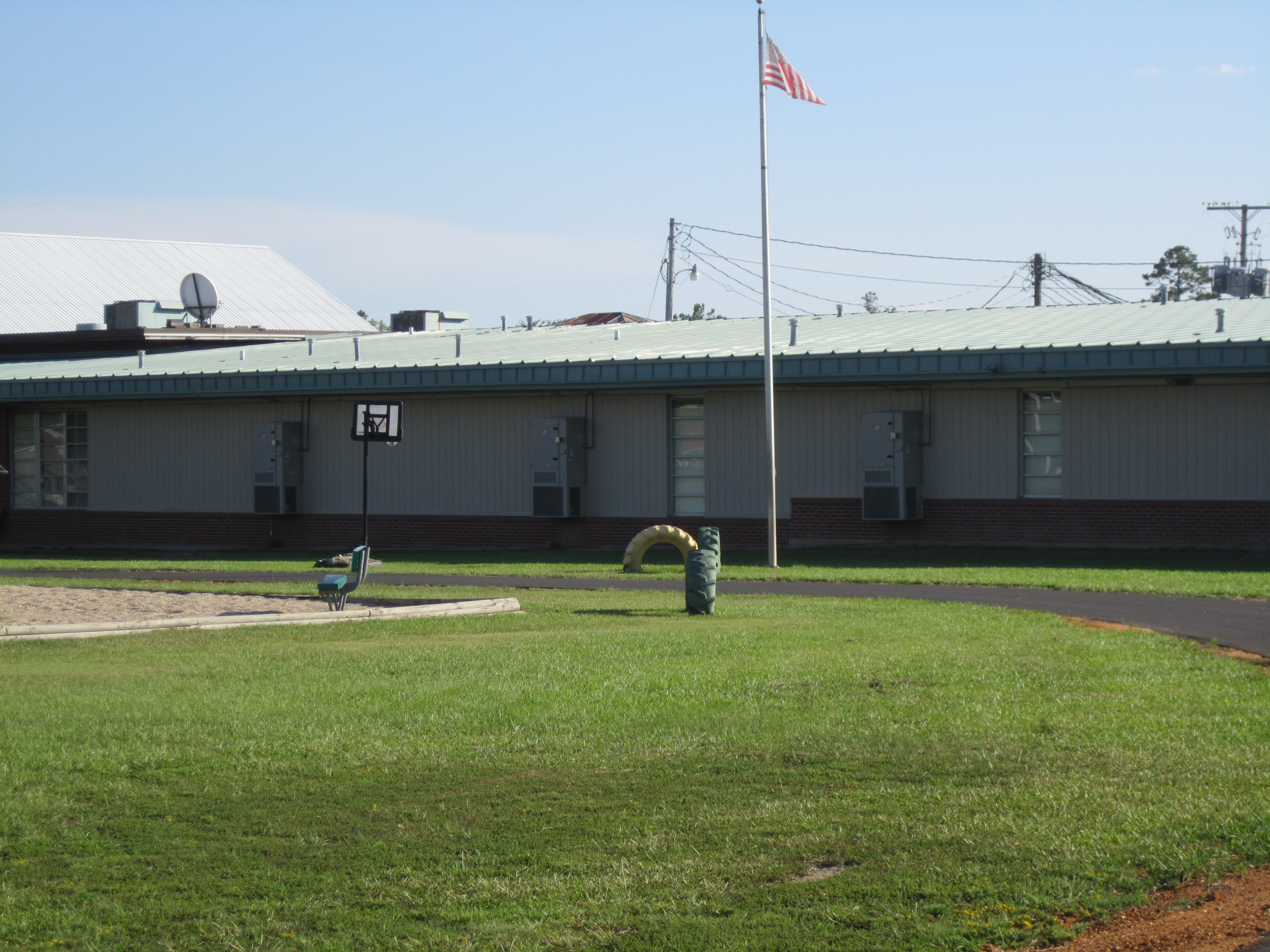
Castor High School

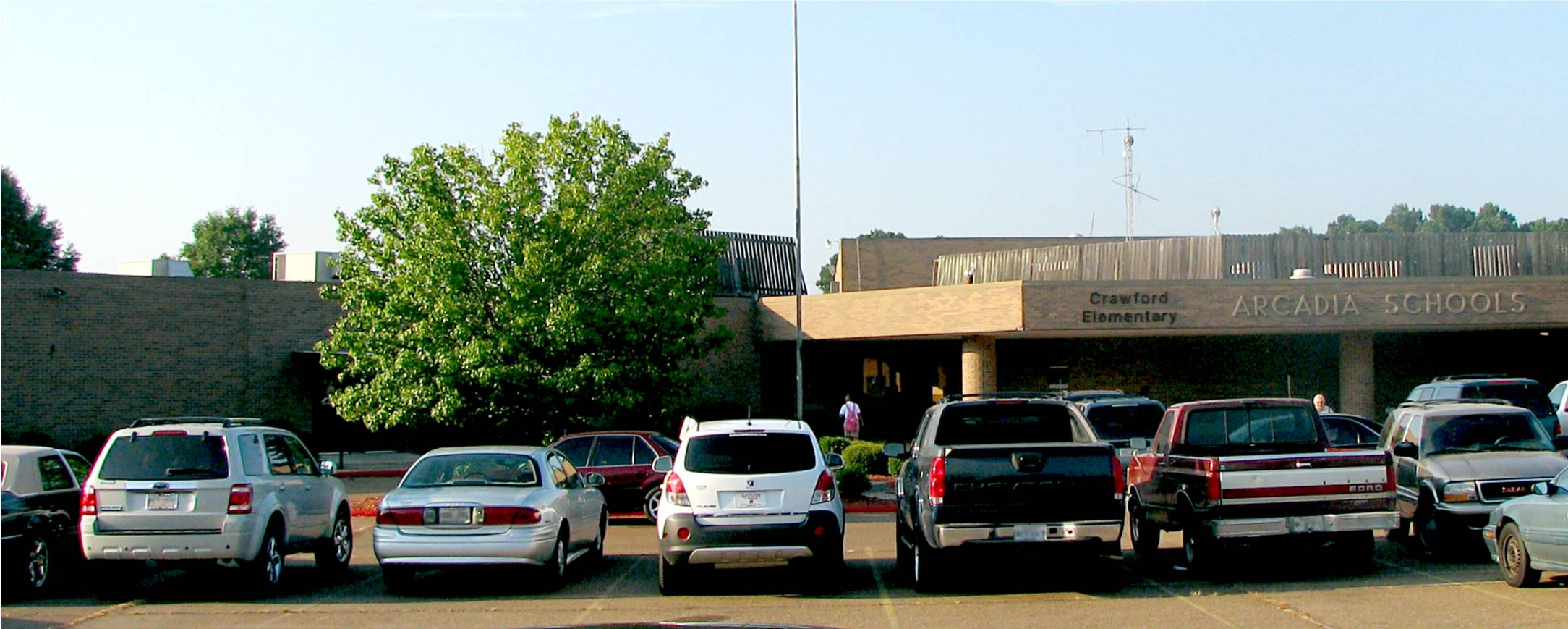
Crawford Elementary School (Arcadia Schools)

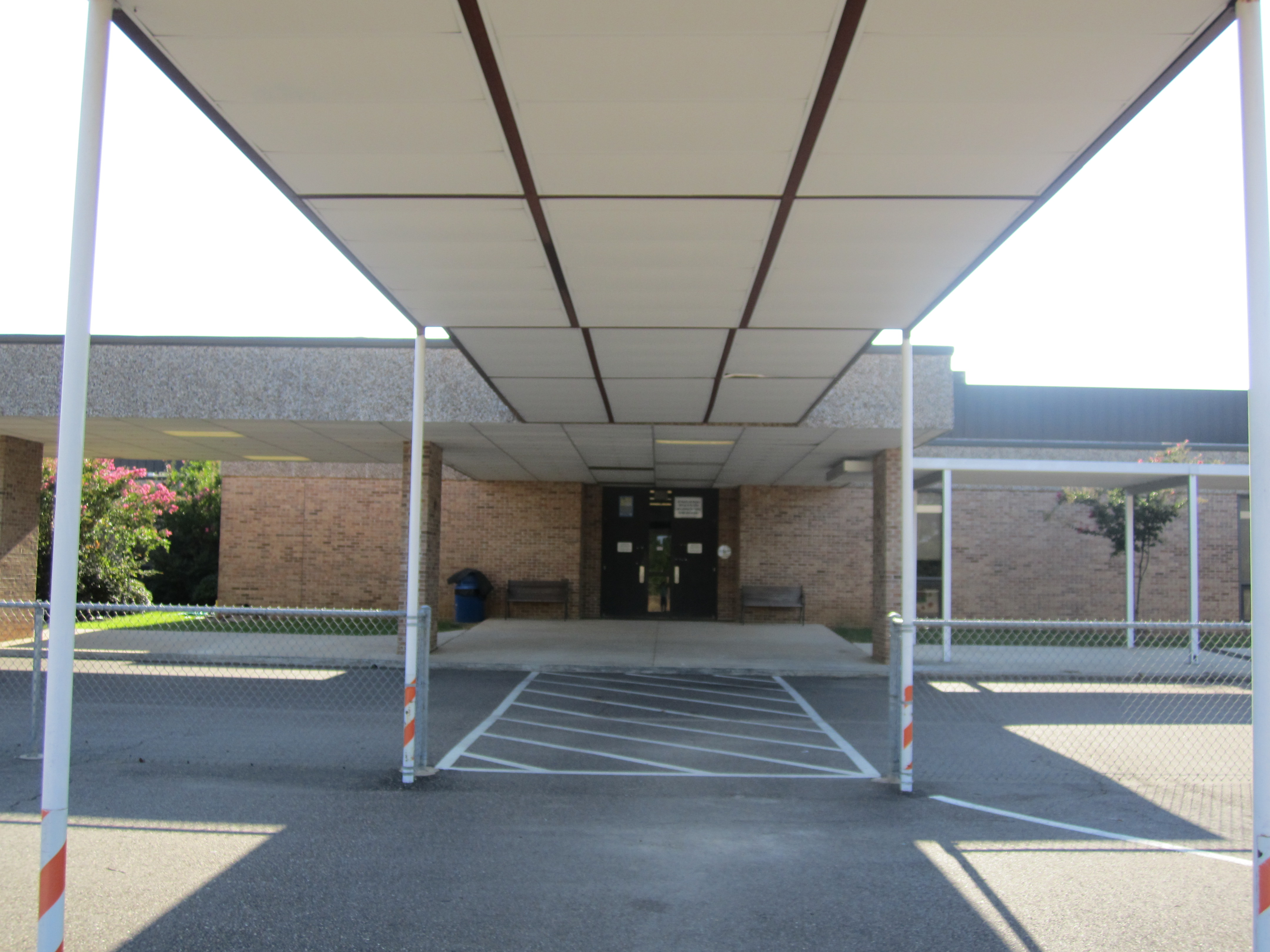
Ringgold School Complex

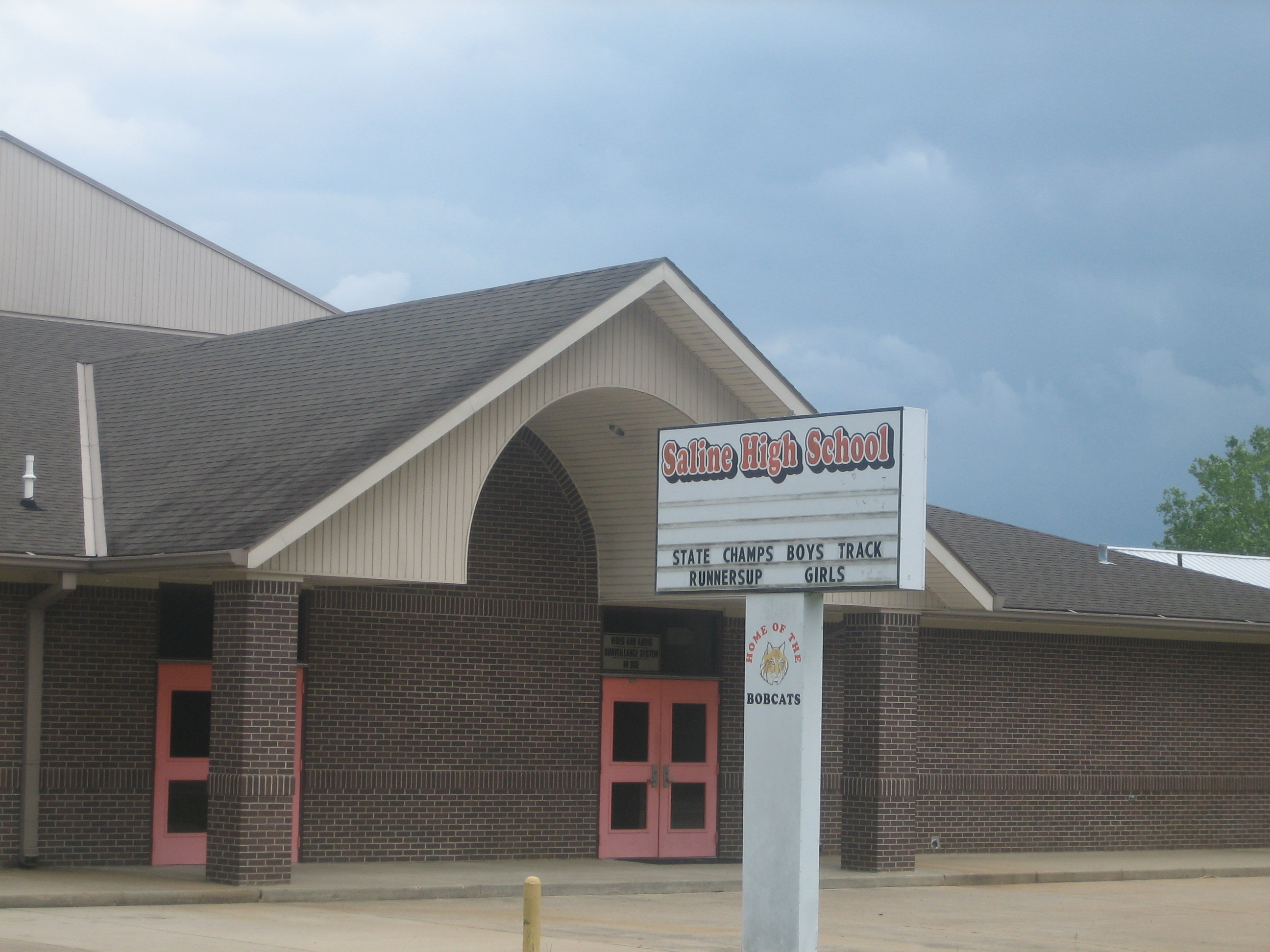
Saline High School

Schools include:

PK-12:

- Bienville School (Bienville)
- Castor High School (Castor)
- Saline High School (Saline)

K-12:

- Gibsland–Coleman High School (Gibsland)

7-12:

- Arcadia High School (Arcadia)
- Ringgold High School (Ringgold)

PK-6:

- Crawford Elementary School (Arcadia)
- Ringgold Elementary School (Ringgold)
