= Arcadia, Louisiana =

Arcadia
- Town
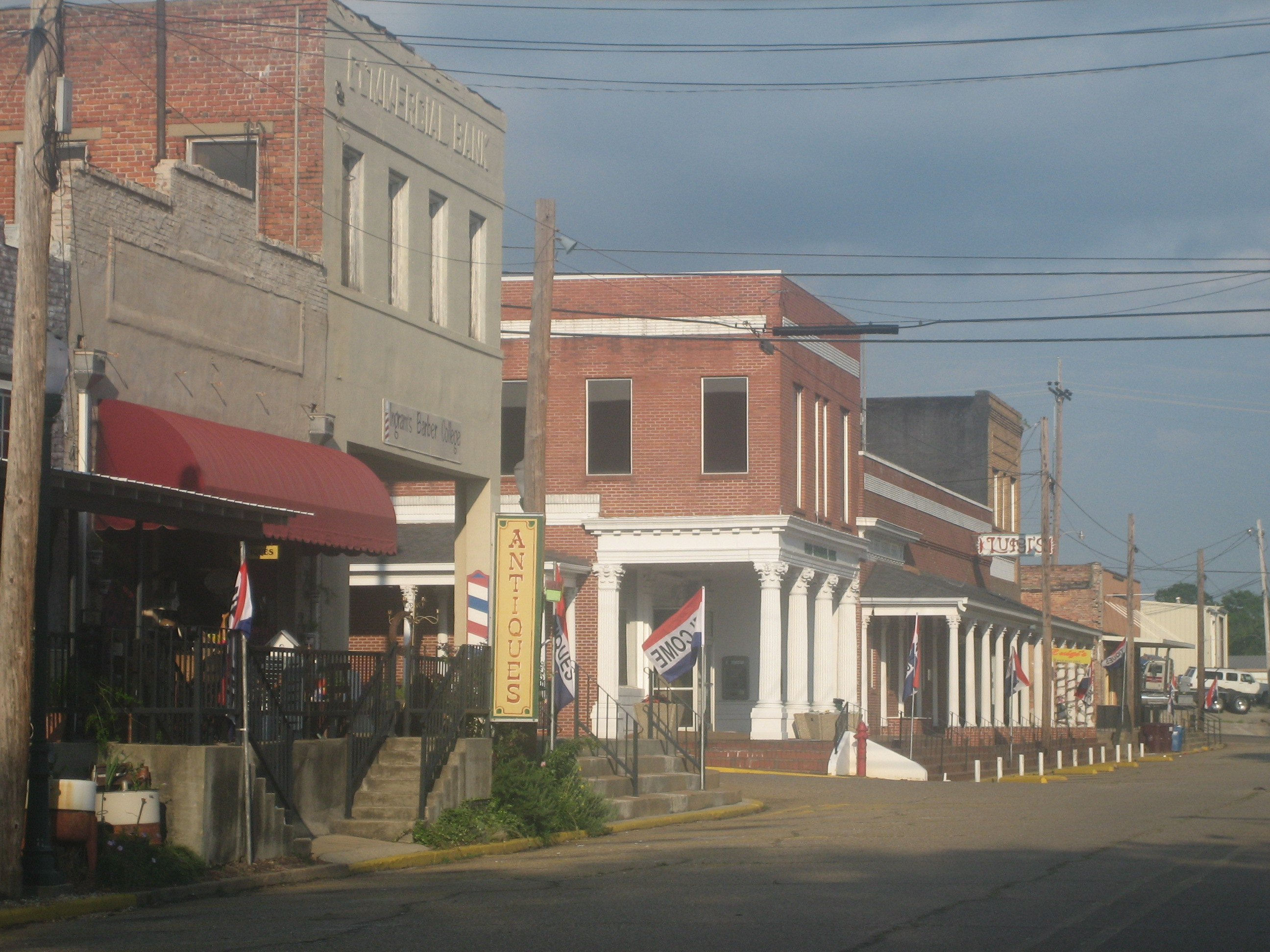
- Downtown Arcadia, Louisiana

- Location of Arcadia in Bienville Parish, Louisiana.

- Location of Louisiana in the United States
- Coordinates: 32°33′02″N 92°55′19″W
- Country: United States
- State: Louisiana
- Parish: Bienville
- Incorporated: 1855 (171 years ago)

Government
  - Mayor: O'Landis "Bubba" Millican (D) (winner of special runoff election on December 8, 2018, to succeed Eugene Smith (D), who died in office in 2018)

Area
  - Total: 3.67 sq mi (9.51 km^{2})
  - Land: 3.64 sq mi (9.44 km^{2})
  - Water: 0.027 sq mi (0.07 km^{2})
- Elevation: 397 ft (121 m)

Population (2020)
  - Total: 2,746
  - Rank: BV: 1st
  - Density: 753.3/sq mi (290.84/km^{2})
- Time zone: UTC−6 (CST)
  - Summer (DST): UTC−5 (CDT)
- ZIP Code: 71001
- Area code: 318
- FIPS code: 22-02655
- GNIS feature ID: 2405160
- Website: www.arcadialouisiana.org

Arcadia is a town in and the parish seat of Bienville Parish in northern Louisiana, United States. As of the 2020 census, Arcadia had a population of 2,746. Arcadia has the highest elevation of any incorporated municipality in Louisiana. Arcadia's name commemorates the Ancient Greek region of Arcadia.

== History ==
In 1934, bank robbers Bonnie and Clyde were killed in Gibsland, near Arcadia in a shootout. Their bodies were brought for embalming to a furniture store in Arcadia which also served as a funeral parlor. Enormous crowds of onlookers descended upon the city when news of the pair's deaths there became public.

Arcadia has been a center of the poultry industry, with up to 300 independent growers for years supplying the local feed mill operated by poultry company Pilgrim's Pride. In 2009 the company, facing bankruptcy, announced that it would close most of its Louisiana operations, including plants in Arcadia, Athens, Choudrant, and Farmerville; these operations were estimated to have provided a combined 1,300 jobs. Several weeks later, Pilgrim's Pride accepted a US$80 million (equivalent to $120 million in 2025) offer from Foster Farms of California to purchase their operations and keep the plants running. Foster Farms put up $40 million of the purchase price, with the other $40 million covered by the State of Louisiana.

== Geography ==
According to the United States Census Bureau, the town has a total area of 3.1 square miles (7.9 km^{2}), all land. It is 50 miles (80 km) east of Shreveport.

== Demographics ==
Historical population
Census	Pop.	Note	%±
1890	862		—
1900	924		7.2%
1910	1,079		16.8%
1920	1,240		14.9%
1930	1,809		45.9%
1940	1,601		−11.5%
1950	2,241		40.0%
1960	2,547		13.7%
1970	2,970		16.6%
1980	3,403		14.6%
1990	3,079		−9.5%
2000	3,041		−1.2%
2010	2,919		−4.0%
2020	2,746		−5.9%
2025 (est.)	2,534	▼	−7.7%
U.S. Decennial Census

=== 2020 census ===
As of the 2020 census, Arcadia had a population of 2,746. The median age was 42.5 years. 21.3% of residents were under the age of 18 and 21.8% were 65 years of age or older. For every 100 females, there were 79.7 males, and for every 100 females age 18 and over, there were 75.9 males.

0.0% of residents lived in urban areas, while 100.0% lived in rural areas.

There were 1,124 households in Arcadia, including 620 families. Of all households, 28.1% had children under the age of 18 living in them. 24.5% were married-couple households, 20.1% were households with a male householder and no spouse or partner present, and 50.1% were households with a female householder and no spouse or partner present. About 37.6% of all households were made up of individuals, and 15.2% had someone living alone who was 65 years of age or older. There were 1,321 housing units, of which 14.9% were vacant. The homeowner vacancy rate was 1.6% and the rental vacancy rate was 6.2%.

Racial composition as of the 2020 census
Race	Number	Percent
White	713	26.0%
Black or African American	1,909	69.5%
American Indian and Alaska Native	12	0.4%
Asian	3	0.1%
Native Hawaiian and Other Pacific Islander	1	0.0%
Some other race	23	0.8%
Two or more races	85	3.1%
Hispanic or Latino (of any race)	61	2.2%

=== 2000 census ===
At the census of 2000, there were 3,041 people, 1,071 households, and 737 families residing in the town. The population density was 1,025.6 inhabitants per square mile (396.0/km^{2}). There were 1,231 housing units at an average density of 415.2 units per square mile (160.3 units/km^{2}).

The racial makeup of the town was 37.98% White, 60.57% African American, 0.26% Native American, 0.10% Asian, 0.26% from various other races, and 0.82% from multiple or mixed races. Hispanics or Latinos of any race were 1.61% of the population.

In 2000, there were 1,071 households, out of which 31.7% had children under the age of 18 living with them, 37.0% were married couples living together, 27.9% had a female householder with no husband present, and 31.1% were non-families. 28.5% of all households were made up of individuals, and 12.7% had someone living alone who was 65 years of age or older. The average household size was 2.57 and the average family size was 3.16. In the town of Arcadia, the population was spread out, with 27.1% under the age of 18, 9.2% from 18 to 24, 24.4% from 25 to 44, 18.7% from 45 to 64, and 20.6% who were 65 years of age or older. The median age was 37 years. For every 100 females, there were 81.1 males. For every 100 females age 18 and over, there were 73.3 males.

=== Income and poverty ===
The median income for a household in the town was $21,661, and the median income for a family was $26,250. Males had a median income of $25,885 versus $17,279 for females. The per capita income for the town was $10,962. About 27.1% of families and 31.4% of the population were below the poverty line, including 42.7% of those under age 18 and 20.6% of those age 65 or over.

At the 2019 census estimates, the median household income increased to $23,494. About 41.9% of the population lived at or below the poverty line, and 17.5% of Arcadia's citizens held a bachelor's degree or higher.

=== Religion ===
Among the numerous churches in downtown Arcadia are First United Methodist Church and the First Baptist Church, both in large sanctuaries. The Louisiana Baptist Convention was founded in 1848 in nearby Mount Lebanon, south of Gibsland, Louisiana.

== Government ==
The Bienville Parish Courthouse was formerly located in a residential section of Arcadia but moved in 2013 to a newly constructed building off Interstate 20.

== Media ==
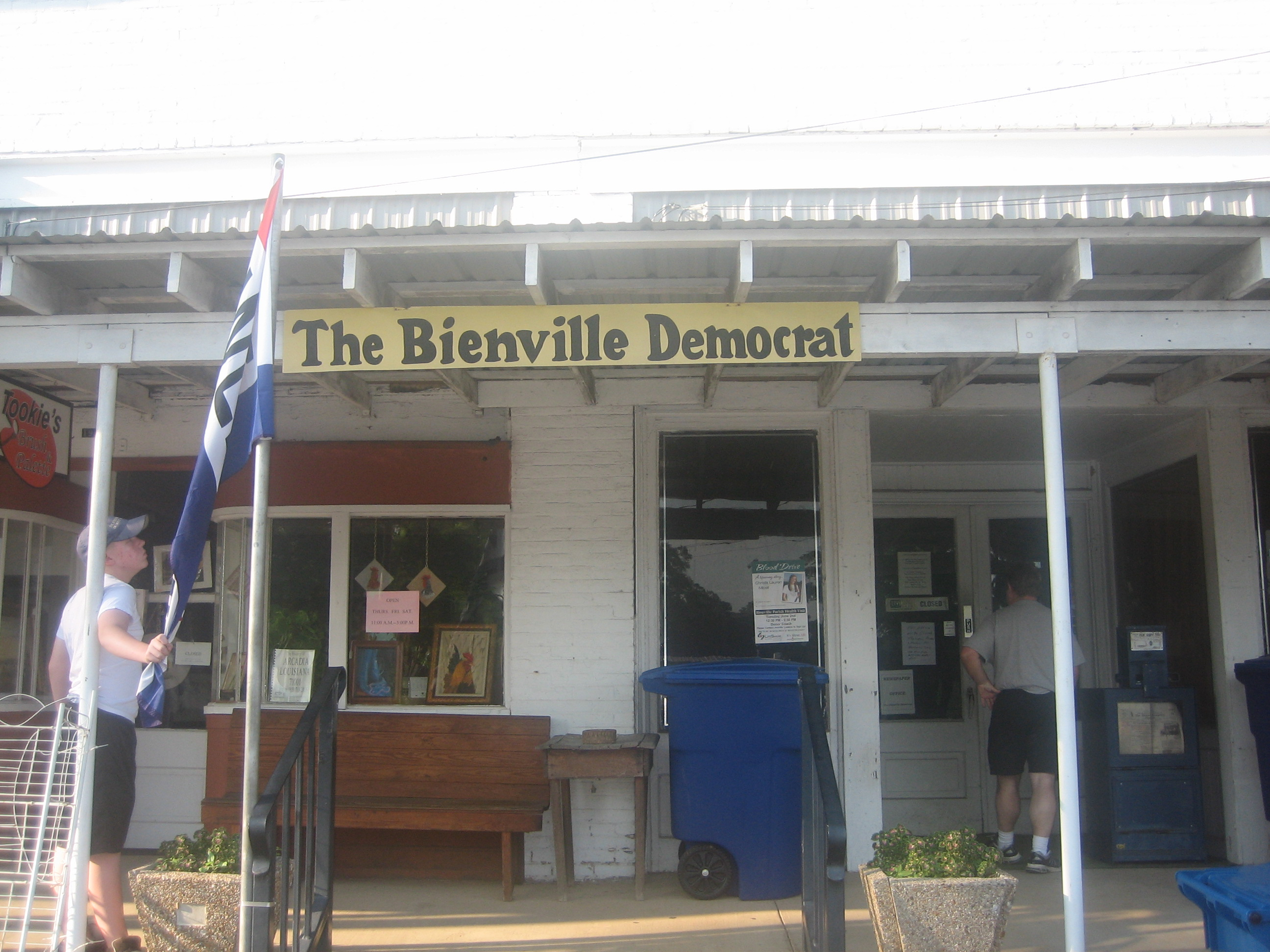
The Bienville Democrat office in Arcadia

The weekly newspaper, The Bienville Democrat, is printed on Wednesdays in Natchitoches, and then distributed across Bienville Parish.

== Education ==
Public schools within Arcadia are under the jurisdiction of the Bienville Parish School Board; the town has no private schools. Arcadia's two public schools are located in the Arcadia School Complex, which encompasses both Arcadia High School and Crawford Elementary School.

== Transportation ==
The Arcadia-Bienville Parish Airport is located two nautical miles (2.3 mi; 3.7 km) southwest of Arcadia's central business district. The Bienville Parish Council on Aging provides public transit for the general population to locations within the town or close by, operating on an as-needed basis. Appointments should be made ahead of time. Private transport is also available for the area, including charter bus services such as J&T Charters, based in El Dorado, Arkansas.

== Notable people ==
- Marcus Fizer, professional basketball player, former collegiate All-American
- Patrick O. Jefferson, African-American member of the Louisiana House of Representatives
- Dub Jones (1924–2024), American football player
- Henderson Jordan (1896–1958), Bienville Parish sheriff who participated in the ambush of Bonnie and Clyde.
- Philip H. Mecom (1889–1969), United States Attorney for the Western District of Louisiana.
- Danny Roy Moore (1925–c. 2020), State senator from Bienville and Claiborne parishes.
- Prentiss Oakley (1905–1957), Jordan's successor as sheriff
- Pol Perritt, MLB player, pitched for New York Giants
- Bettye Swann, soul singer best known for the 1967 hit "Make Me Yours".
- Lorris M. Wimberly, former four-time Speaker of the Louisiana House of Representatives
- Rush Wimberly, lawyer in Arcadia and Shreveport, member of both houses of the Louisiana legislature
