= Gibsland, Louisiana =

- Town
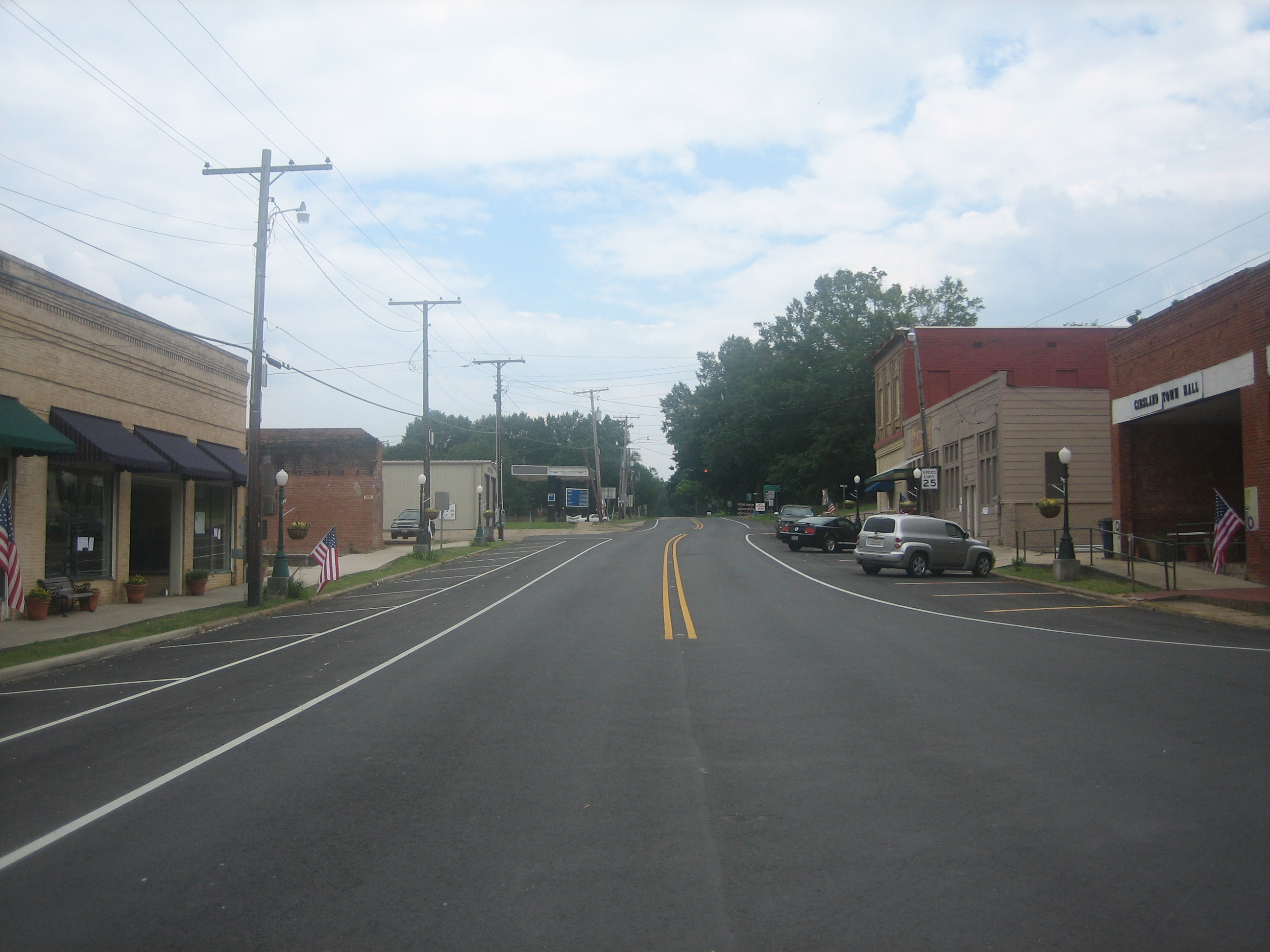
- Downtown Gibsland

- Location of Gibsland in Bienville Parish, Louisiana.

- Location of Louisiana in the United States
- Coordinates: 32°32′22″N 93°03′15″W
- Country: United States
- State: Louisiana
- Parish: Bienville

Area
  - Total: 2.65 sq mi (6.87 km^{2})
  - Land: 2.63 sq mi (6.82 km^{2})
  - Water: 0.023 sq mi (0.06 km^{2})
- Elevation: 295 ft (90 m)

Population (2020)
  - Total: 773
  - Density: 293.6/sq mi (113.36/km^{2})
- Time zone: UTC-6
  - Summer (DST): UTC-5 (CDT)
- Area code: 318
- FIPS code: 22-28835
- GNIS feature ID: 2406562

Gibsland is a town in Bienville Parish in northern Louisiana, United States. As of the 2020 census, its population was 773. The town is best known for its connecting railroads, as the birthplace of the defunct historically black Coleman College, and for being the place where notorious criminals Bonnie Parker and Clyde Barrow were ambushed and killed by Texas Rangers on May 23, 1934.

Gibsland native John McConathy was a champion basketball player at Northwestern State University in Natchitoches, Louisiana, who later was the superintendent for the Bossier Parish School Board, in which capacity he was the guiding force behind the establishment of the $57 million Bossier Parish Community College.

== History ==
=== Coleman College ===
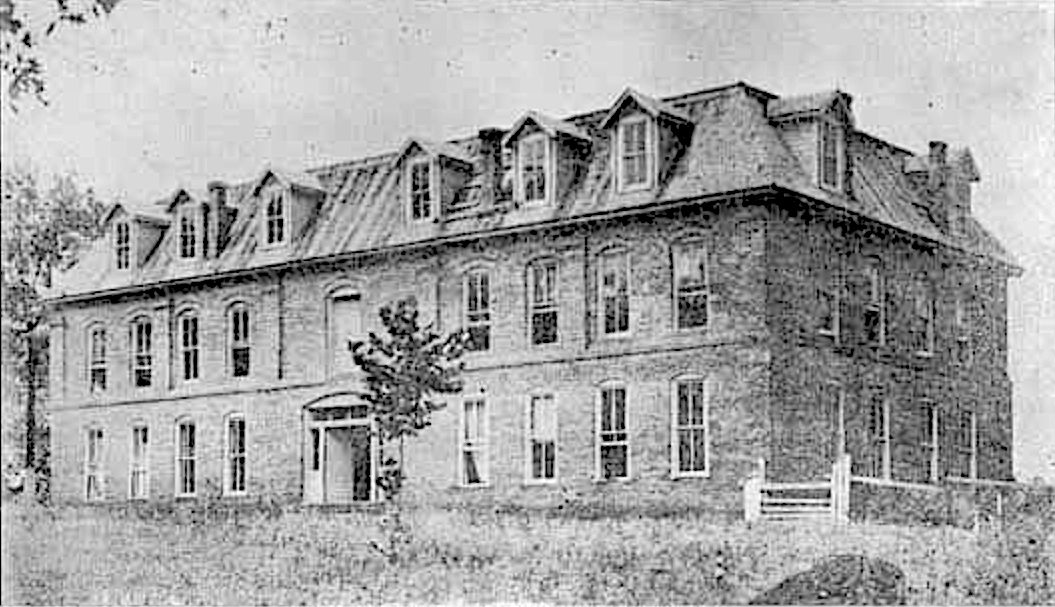
Coleman College (1915) in Gibsland

Coleman College (also known as Coleman Academy) was a segregated African American secondary school founded in Gibsland in 1887 by O. L. Coleman; it was the first secondary school for Black students in northern Louisiana. It was affiliated with the Baptist Church, and supported by the American Baptist Home Mission Society. The institution produced primarily teachers and ministers.

The school remained in the community until the Great Depression, in which it closed in 1937. It later re-opened in Shreveport in 1943, and remained there until the 1950s.

=== Railroad history ===
First incorporated in 1889, the Louisiana & North West Railroad Company operates 62 miles (100 km) of shortline between Gibsland and McNeil, Arkansas. The LNW interchanges on both ends of the line: with the Union Pacific (former St. Louis Southwestern) in McNeil; and with Kansas City Southern (former MidSouth, ICG) at Gibsland.

For many years the road was well known among railfans for its unusual stable of F7 "covered wagons"—unusual motive power of choice for a backwoods southern shortline. In the early 1990s, the F units were sold off to various places, gradually replaced by Geeps from various locations. The LNW shops are located at Gibsland, a few hundred yards from one of the busiest interchange diamonds in all of the state. For decades, three different railroads interchanged in Gibsland. The switching activity could get so hectic the daily routine was known among railfans as the "Gibsland Shuffle."

=== Death of Bonnie and Clyde ===
On May 23, 1934, Bonnie Parker and Clyde Barrow, an infamous pair of bandits, were killed by law enforcement officers off Louisiana Highway 154, south of Gibsland toward Sailes.

== Geography ==
Gibsland is located in northern Bienville Parish.

According to the United States Census Bureau, the town has a total area of 2.7 square miles (6.9 km^{2}), of which 0.023 square miles (0.06 km^{2}), or 0.81%, is water.

== Demographics ==
Historical population
Census	Pop.	Note	%±
1900	558		—
1910	1,065		90.9%
1920	798		−25.1%
1930	1,090		36.6%
1940	1,023		−6.1%
1950	1,085		6.1%
1960	1,150		6.0%
1970	1,380		20.0%
1980	1,354		−1.9%
1990	1,224		−9.6%
2000	1,119		−8.6%
2010	979		−12.5%
2020	773		−21.0%
2025 (est.)	734	▼	−5.0%
U.S. Decennial Census

Gibsland racial composition as of 2020
Race	Number	Percentage
White (non-Hispanic)	70	9.06%
Black or African American (non-Hispanic)	660	85.38%
Native American	1	0.13%
Other/Mixed	25	3.23%
Hispanic or Latino	17	2.2%

As of the 2020 United States census, there were 773 people, 261 households, and 161 families residing in the town.

== Education ==
The Bienville Parish School Board operates the K-12 Gibsland–Coleman High School in Gibsland.

== Arts and culture ==
=== Festivals ===
The Jonquil Jubilee and Historic and Garden Tour and the Bonnie and Clyde Festival are celebrated annually. The Jonquil Jubilee offers advice to area gardeners from botanists.

=== Bonnie and Clyde Festival ===
The Bonnie and Clyde Festival is held in Gibsland in mid-May. It features a staged bank robbery by actors portraying the infamous duo. The festival has been featured on the television program Weird U.S. on the History Channel. Bonnie and Clyde were killed off Louisiana Highway 154, south of Gibsland toward Sailes.

=== Bonnie and Clyde Ambush Museum ===
Gibsland is home to the Bonnie and Clyde Ambush Museum located in the former Ma Canfield’s Café where the outlaws ate their last meal, a breakfast. The museum is owned and operated by Perry Carver. Linton Jay "Boots" Hinton (born January 1, 1934, died December 5, 2016), formerly of Dallas and a son of posse member Ted Hinton managed the museum until his health failed. The museum exhibits also mention the local posse members brought in for jurisdictional reasons, Bienville Parish Sheriff Henderson Jordan (1896–1958) and his chief deputy and successor as sheriff, Prentiss Oakley (1905–1957).

=== Gibsland-Coleman Alumni ===
Gibsland-Coleman Alumni Association was organized in 1981. The first reunion was held in July 1981. The Gibsland-Coleman Alumni Association is a non-profit organization of alumni and other individuals who are interested in supporting the organization-mainly providing college scholarships annually to graduating seniors. Chapters are located in Houston, Los Angeles, and Gibsland. The reunion is held in Gibsland annually during the first weekend of July.

== Government officials ==
The present Mayor of Gibsland is Jeannie Richardson. Ms. Richardson qualified to run for mayor in the 2022 elections against incumbent Mayor Ray Ivory. Ms. Richardson won with a 67% majority. Ms. Richardson assumed the position of Mayor in January 2023 and will serve a four-year term. There are five Aldermen who serve on the Council of the Town of Gibsland. Julius Pearson, Gary Durham, Angela Adams, Dianna Pearson and Debra Rushing all qualified to run in the 2022 election, and were unopposed; therefore, they assumed their positions in January 2022. All the councilmembers were on the previous council with the exception of Angela Adams. This will be her first term. All councilmembers will serve a four-year term.

== Notable people ==
- Charles M. Blow, journalist and columnist for The New York Times
- Ralph Hamner, professional baseball player for the Chicago White Sox and Chicago Cubs
- Bernard King, son of Victor King, Texas A&M Aggies men's basketball player
- Victor King, Louisiana Tech Bulldogs basketball player, drafted by the Los Angeles Lakers
- William E. King, state legislator in the Illinois House of Representatives
- John McConathy, Northwestern State Demons basketball player and Syracuse Nationals draftee
- W. C. Robinson, second president of Louisiana Tech University (1899–1900)
- Sam Smith, first African American to serve as a Seattle city councilman
- Jesse N. Stone, first African American justice on the Louisiana Supreme Court
- F. Jay Taylor, president of Louisiana Tech University
- Jimmy Wilson, blues musician

== Gallery ==
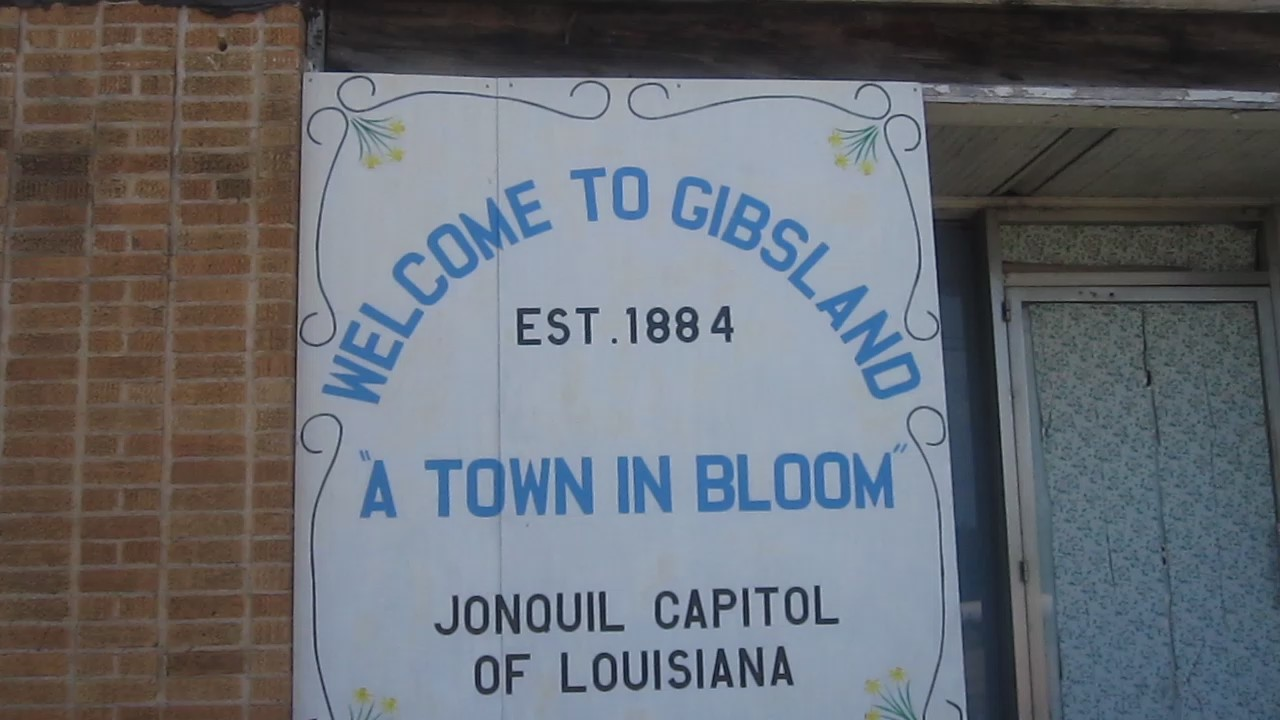
Gibsland welcoming sign: "The Jonquil Capital of Louisiana"

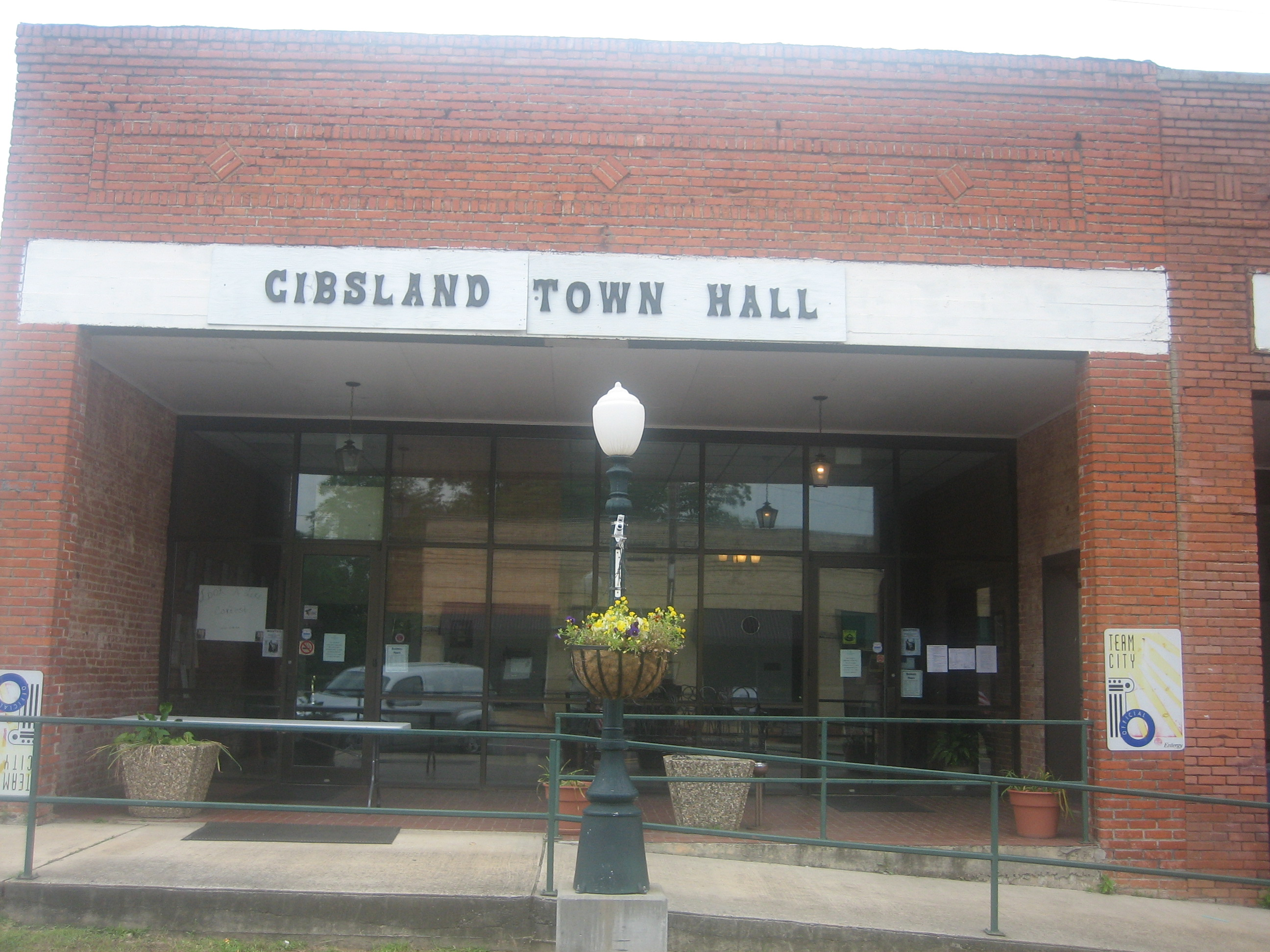
Gibsland Town Hall

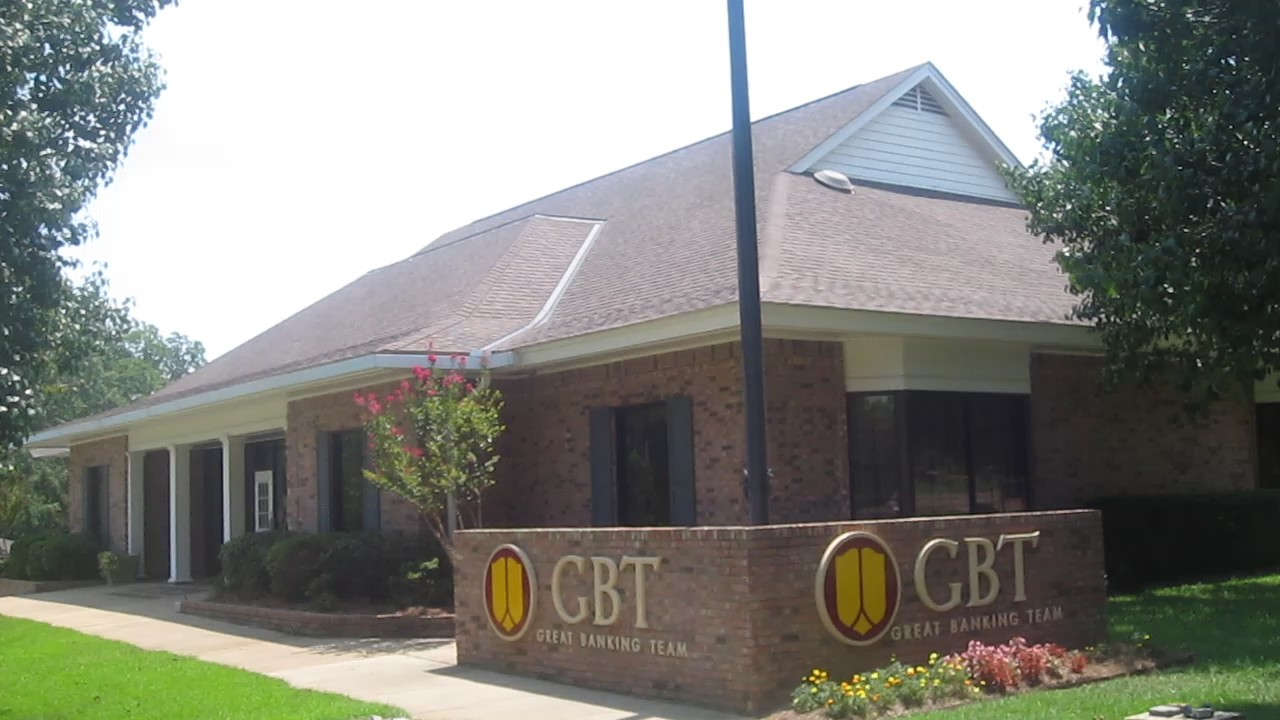
Gibsland Bank and Trust Company also has a branch in nearby Minden.

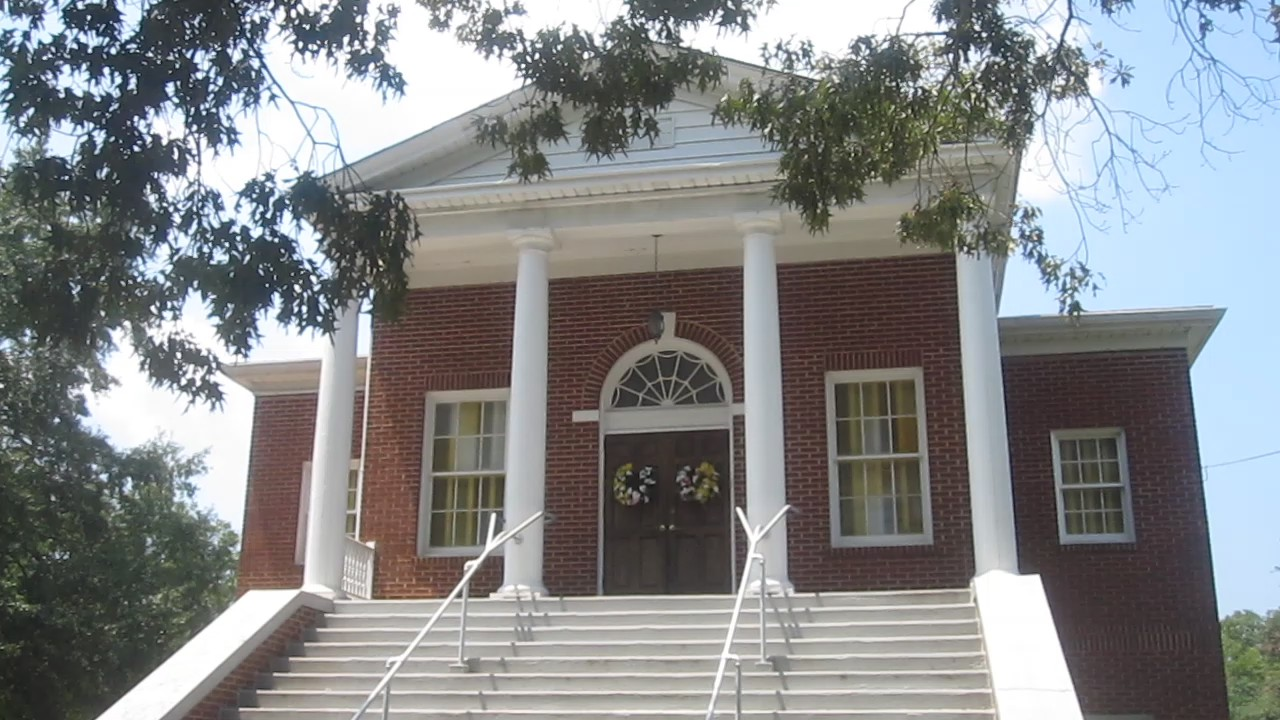
First United Methodist Church in Gibsland

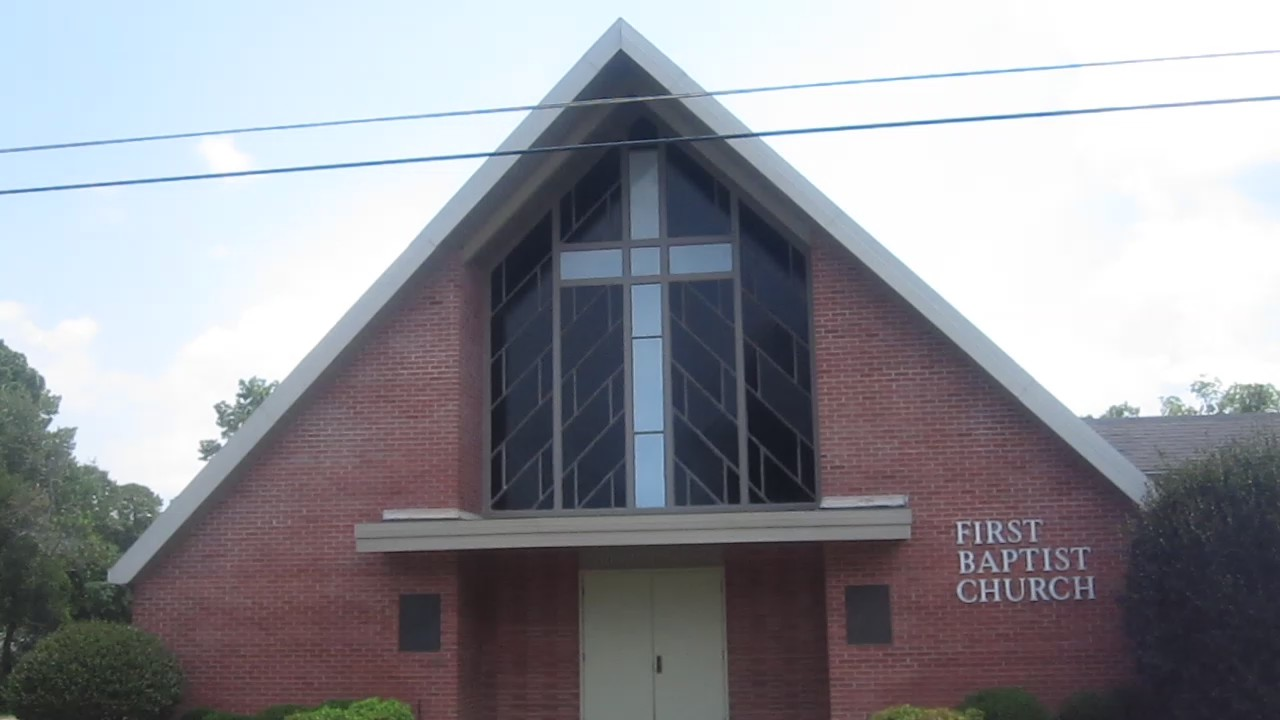
First Baptist Church of Gibsland

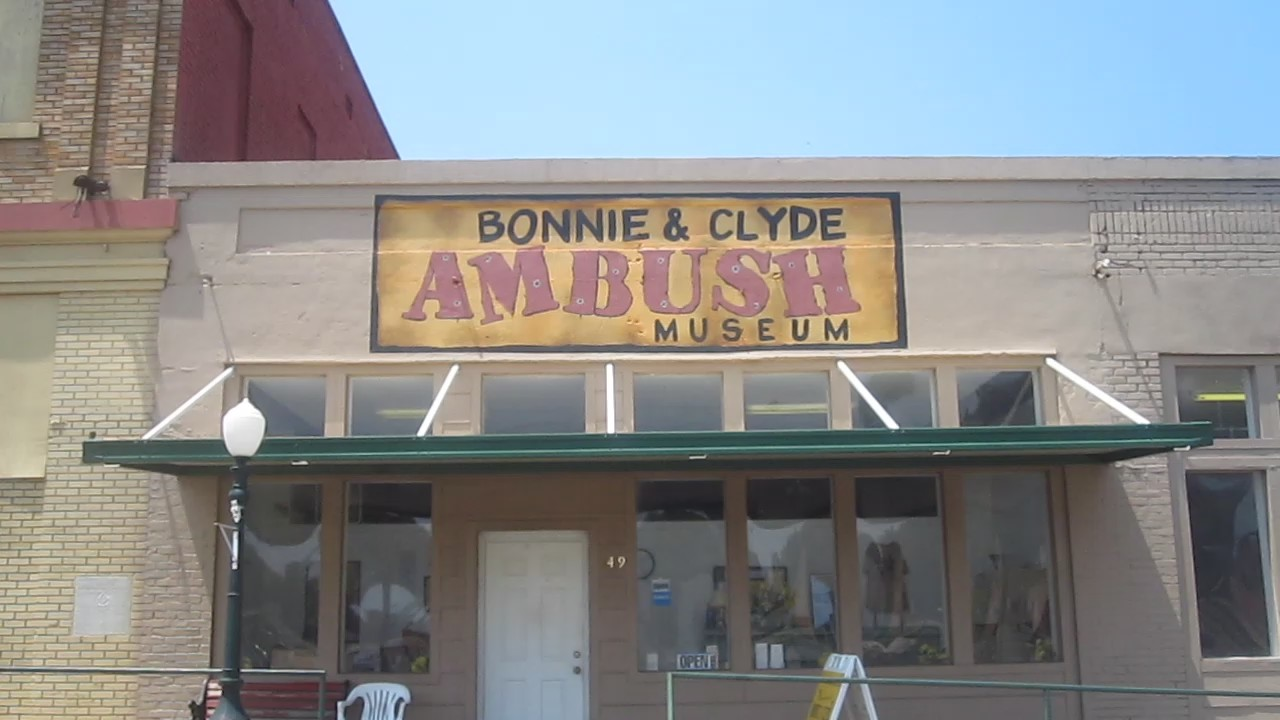
The Bonnie and Clyde Ambush Museum in Gibsland

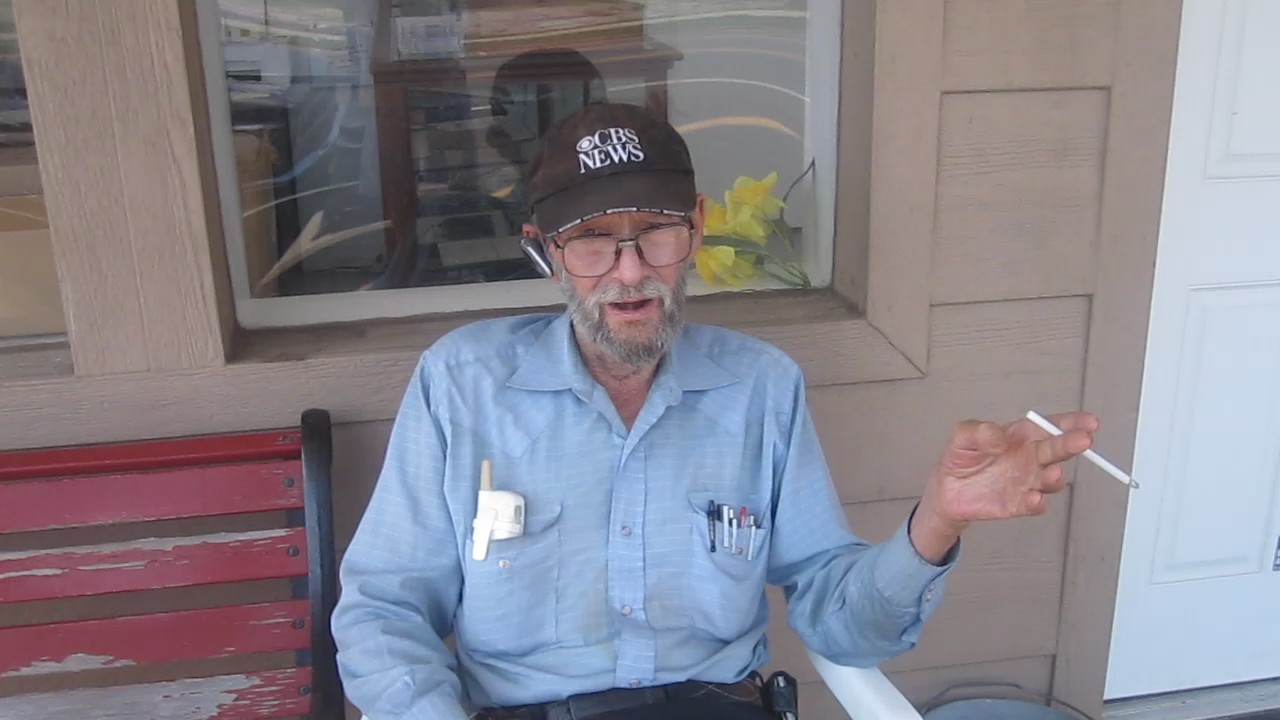
Linton Jay "Boots" Hinton (born January 1, 1934) is the curator of the Bonnie & Clyde Ambush Museum.
