= Tornado outbreak of April 23, 2000 =

Tornado outbreak in Oklahoma, Texas, Arkansas, and Louisiana on April 23, 2000

Meteorological history
- Formed: April 23, 2000

Tornado outbreak
- Tornadoes: 33
- Max. rating: F3 tornado

Overall effects
- Injuries: 12
- Areas affected: Southern Plains, Southeastern United States
- Part of the tornado outbreaks of 2000

The Tornado outbreak of April 23, 2000, also known as the 2000 Easter Sunday tornado outbreak, occurred in the states of Oklahoma, Texas, Arkansas, and Louisiana on Easter Sunday, April 23, 2000. This severe weather occurrence was the result of a cold front moving through the area from North Texas and consisted of at least six supercell thunderstorms. A total of 33 tornadoes touched down within seven hours on April 23, 2000. No fatalities were reported, but at least 12 individuals were injured.

== Confirmed tornadoes ==
Confirmed tornadoes by Fujita rating
FU	F0	F1	F2	F3	F4	F5	Total
0	4	12	14	3	0	0	33

=== April 23 event ===
F#	Location	County/Parish	Time (UTC)	Path length	Fatalities/Injuries
Oklahoma
F1	NE of Hartshorne	Pittsburg	1322	2 miles	5 injuries
F2	SE of Wright City	McCurtain	1408	20.1 miles	2 injuries
F2	Moyers area	Pushmataha	1411	9 miles	None
F0	Fanshawe area	LeFlore	1425	0.2 miles	None
F2	W of Cloudy	Pushmataha	1437	9 miles	None
F1	Idabel area	McCurtain	1458	17.2 miles	None
Texas
F2	N of Woodland	Red River	1341	12.5 miles	None
F0	Tira area	Hopkins	1348	4 miles	2 injuries
F2	NE of Mount Pleasant	Titus, Cass	1453	16.8 miles	None
F2	NW of Daingerfield	Morris, Cass	1510	7 miles	None
F2	NE of Daingerfield	Cass	1522	11.8 miles	None
F1	Hallsville area	Harrison	1534	4.5 miles	None
F2	SE of Hallsville	Harrison	1539	10.6 miles	None
F2	W of Douglassville	Cass	1556	14 miles	None
F1	SW of Linden	Cass	1558	12.5 miles	None
F3	N of Linden	Cass	1558	16 miles	None
F2	Marshall area	Harrison	1602	17 miles	None
F1	W of Jonesville	Harrison	1630	5 miles	None
F1	W of Carthage	Panola	1651	7 miles	None
Arkansas
F1	SW of West Otis	Little River, Sevier	1554	13 miles	None
F1	NE of West Otis	Sevier	1557	9.7 miles	None
F0	W of Tollette	Howard	1601	3.8 miles	None
F0	W of Prescott	Hempstead	1625	2.4 miles	None
F1	W of Bradley	Lafayette	1728	8 miles	None
Louisiana
F1	Vivian area	Caddo	1610	8 miles	None
F3	W of Greenwood	Caddo, Bossier	1640	32.5 miles	3 injuries
F2	NW of Alden Bridge	Bossier, Webster	1640	37.2 miles	None
F2	Mansfield area	DeSoto	1746	8.5 miles	None
F3	S of Wemple	DeSoto, Red River, Natchitoches	1805	19.3 miles	None
F1	Shreveport area	Caddo, Bossier	1805	8 miles	6 injuries
F2	N of Castor	Bienville	1816	4.3 miles	None
F1	S of Chatham	Jackson	1930	2.5 miles	1 injury
F2	E of Jena	LaSalle	2050	2.3 miles	None

== See also ==
- List of North American tornadoes and tornado outbreaks
- 2020 Easter tornado outbreak
