= Saline, Louisiana =

- Village
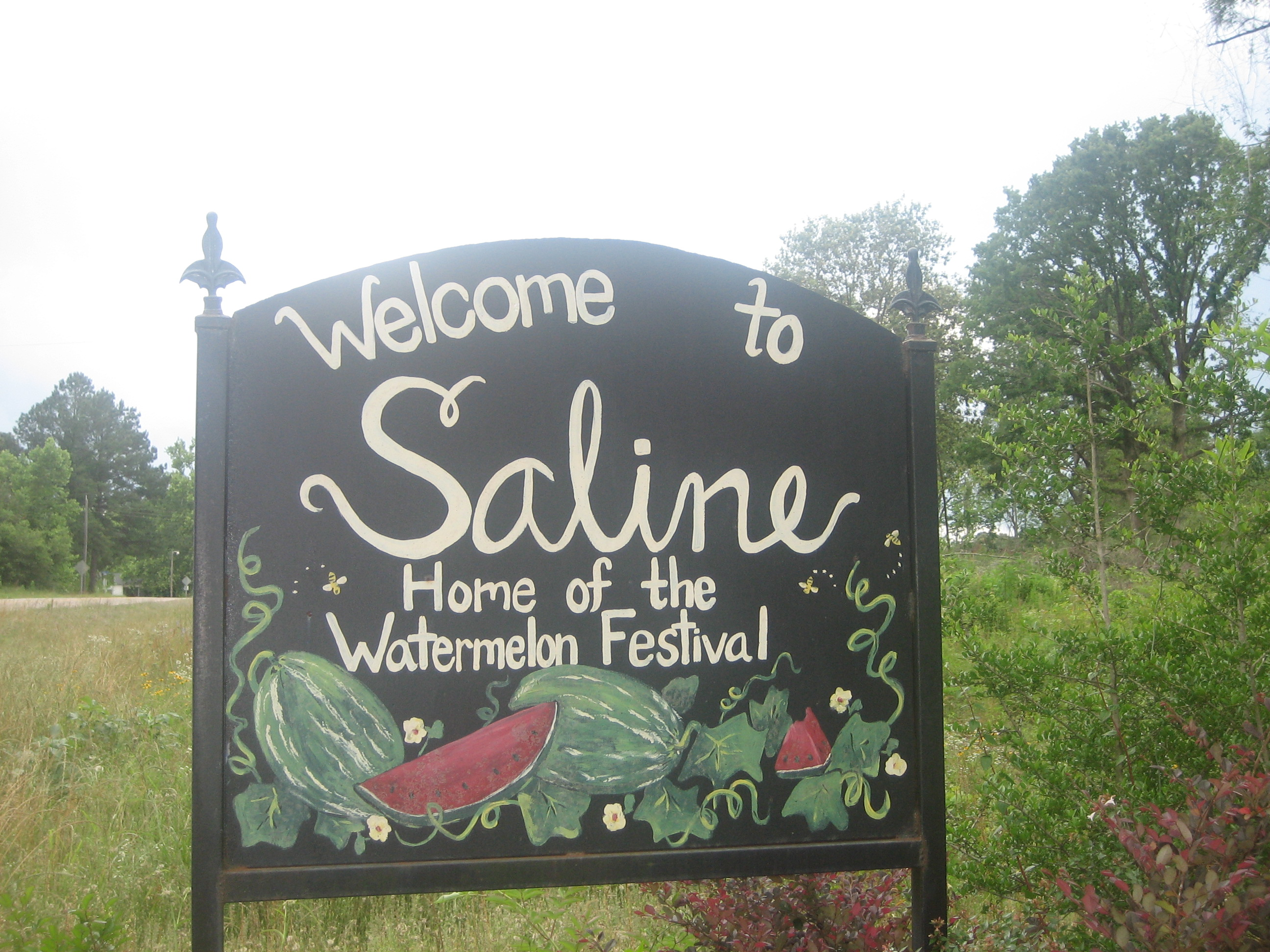
- Saline welcome sign

- Location of Saline in Bienville Parish, Louisiana.

- Location of Louisiana in the United States
- Coordinates: 32°09′47″N 92°58′36″W
- Country: United States
- State: Louisiana
- Parish: Bienville

Area
  - Total: 1.19 sq mi (3.08 km^{2})
  - Land: 1.19 sq mi (3.08 km^{2})
  - Water: 0 sq mi (0.00 km^{2})
- Elevation: 194 ft (59 m)

Population (2020)
  - Total: 265
  - Density: 222.7/sq mi (85.98/km^{2})
- Time zone: UTC-6 (CST)
  - Summer (DST): UTC-5 (CDT)
- Area code: 318
- FIPS code: 22-67880
- GNIS feature ID: 2407541

Saline is a village in southeastern Bienville Parish, Louisiana, United States. As of the 2020 census, Saline had a population of 265. Saline is pronounced "Suh-LEEN". Cotton has been grown in the area and a watermelon festival is hosted.

== Geography ==
According to the United States Census Bureau, the village has a total area of 1.2 square miles (3.1 km^{2}), all land. The Mill Creek Reservoir in Saline, often referred to as Saline Lake, is the biggest body of water in Bienville Parish. The waters are fairly deep making it ideal for boating, skiing and other water activities.

== Churches and cemeteries ==
Saline has several Baptist congregations, including Old Saline Baptist, whose original pastor was George Washington Baines, maternal great-grandfather of U.S. President Lyndon B. Johnson. Within Saline is the Magnolia Baptist Church. Several miles east of Saline off Louisiana Highway 155 is Carolina Baptist Church. All three rural churches have accompanying cemeteries.

== Demographics ==
Historical population
| Census | Pop. | Note | %± |
|---|---|---|---|
| 1910 | 346 | | — |
| 1920 | 390 | | 12.7% |
| 1930 | 346 | | −11.3% |
| 1940 | 381 | | 10.1% |
| 1950 | 357 | | −6.3% |
| 1960 | 329 | | −7.8% |
| 1970 | 307 | | −6.7% |
| 1980 | 293 | | −4.6% |
| 1990 | 272 | | −7.2% |
| 2000 | 296 | | 8.8% |
| 2010 | 277 | | −6.4% |
| 2020 | 265 | | −4.3% |
| 2025 (est.) | 254 | ▼ | −4.2% |
U.S. Decennial Census

As of the census of 2000, there were 296 people, 111 households, and 85 families residing in the village. The population density was 249.9 inhabitants per square mile (96.5/km^{2}). There were 133 housing units at an average density of 112.3 per square mile (43.4/km^{2}). The racial makeup of the village was 74.66% White, 25.00% African American, and 0.34% from two or more races. Hispanic or Latino of any race were 1.69% of the population.

There were 111 households, out of which 36.9% had children under the age of 18 living with them, 53.2% were married couples living together, 16.2% had a female householder with no husband present, and 23.4% were non-families. 23.4% of all households were made up of individuals, and 14.4% had someone living alone who was 65 years of age or older. The average household size was 2.67 and the average family size was 3.13.

In the village, the population was spread out, with 30.1% under the age of 18, 9.5% from 18 to 24, 25.0% from 25 to 44, 19.9% from 45 to 64, and 15.5% who were 65 years of age or older. The median age was 35 years. For every 100 females, there were 102.7 males. For every 100 females age 18 and over, there were 91.7 males.

The median income for a household in the village was $26,500, and the median income for a family was $31,250. Males had a median income of $26,458 versus $16,719 for females. The per capita income for the village was $11,364. About 17.3% of families and 21.9% of the population were below the poverty line, including 26.1% of those under the age of eighteen and 17.2% of those 65 or over.

== Arts and culture ==
The Saline Watermelon Festival is Louisiana's oldest watermelon festival. With cotton prices declining in the 1920s, local farmers searched for more profitable crops. They created the Saline Dairy & Truck Growers Association and diversified their yields, growing fruits and vegetables – most notably, watermelons. This led to Louisiana’s first watermelon festival, held in 1931, to celebrate the harvest. Customers included President Franklin Roosevelt and King George V of the United Kingdom.

The festival, originally held on Fridays, drew huge crowds from distant places who would come in via the train or car. People came to play games, eat watermelon, gather with old friends, and enjoy their day mingling around. In 1933, the festival attracted approximately 10,000 people but with the onset of the depression, it was the last annual watermelon festival to be held in the town for 50 years.

In 1983, after many months of work by Carolyn Dison, Gertie Baker, Gertrude Enloe, Elizabeth Dushane, and Betty Wiggins, the festival was held once again and became an annual event. Held on the second Saturday in July, it offers an event-filled week. From beauty pageants to live music, an antique car show to an old-fashioned parade, arts & crafts vendors and favorite food vendors. On Saturday night, the festival comes to an end with an old-fashioned street dance with dancing into the night.

== Commerce ==
A branch of Sabine State Bank operates in Saline.

== Media ==
For several years, Mill Creek Reservoir was the camping spot for international cross-country motorcycle racers who, once a year, would race through the neighboring properties for a timed race. Starting at the crossroads in Saline, under the traffic light which is only a stop sign now, racers would race through the area forests for approximately 6–8 hours, if they didn’t get lost, then back to The Watergate where the finish line was located. The winners of “The Great Saline Enduro” were determined by who had the fastest time it took to complete the course. This one event brought in people from several different countries.

In 1988, Saline was transformed into a movie set for the filming of movie Blaze, starring Paul Newman. During his time in the town, Newman was shown around the area by the local sheriff Reed Williams. Newman expressed admiration for a pair of new puppies the sheriff’s dog had recently birthed, so the sheriff gave him the male/female pair. For years, these two pups could be seen on the labels of Newman’s Own salad dressing.

== Education ==
Saline has one school, a modern structure that houses elementary, middle, and high school buildings.

== Residents ==
Jamie Fair, a member of the Louisiana House of Representatives from 1980–1984, resides between Saline and Castor off Louisiana Highway 9. Former Second Judicial District Court Judge David T. Caldwell, based in Jonesboro, was born in Saline and graduated from Saline High School in 1942.

== Gallery ==
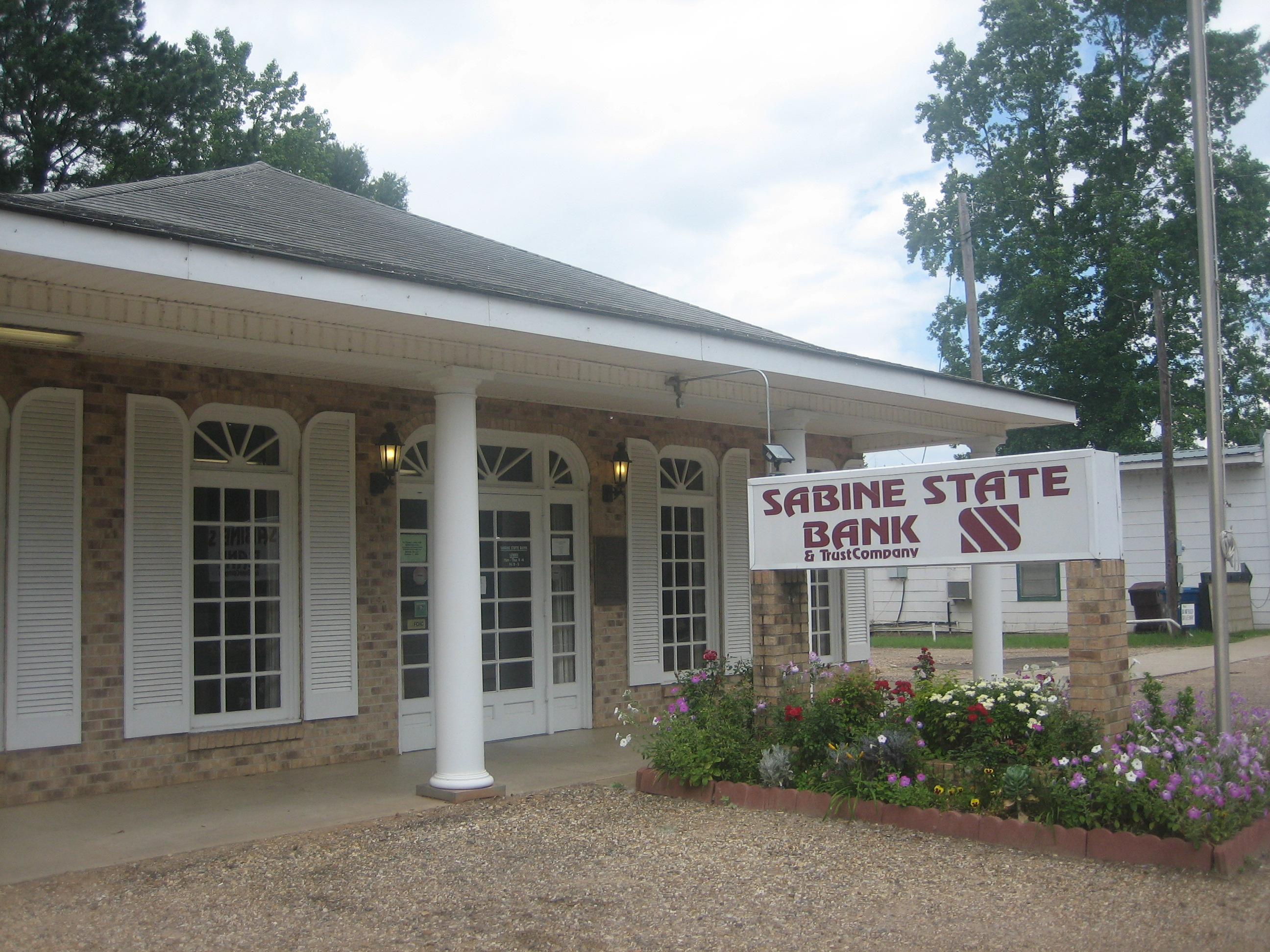
Saline houses a branch of the Sabine State Bank.

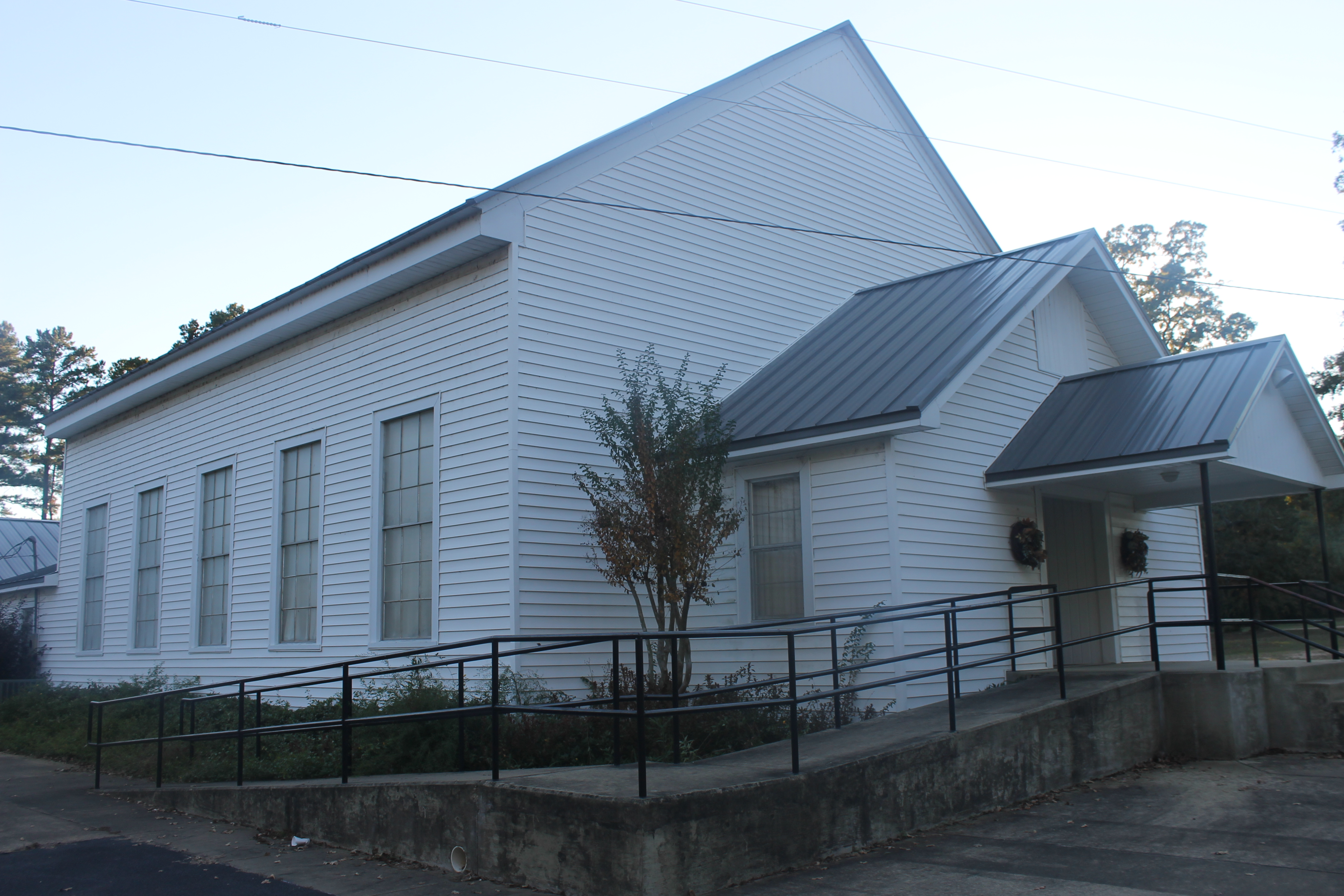
The Old Saline Baptist Church

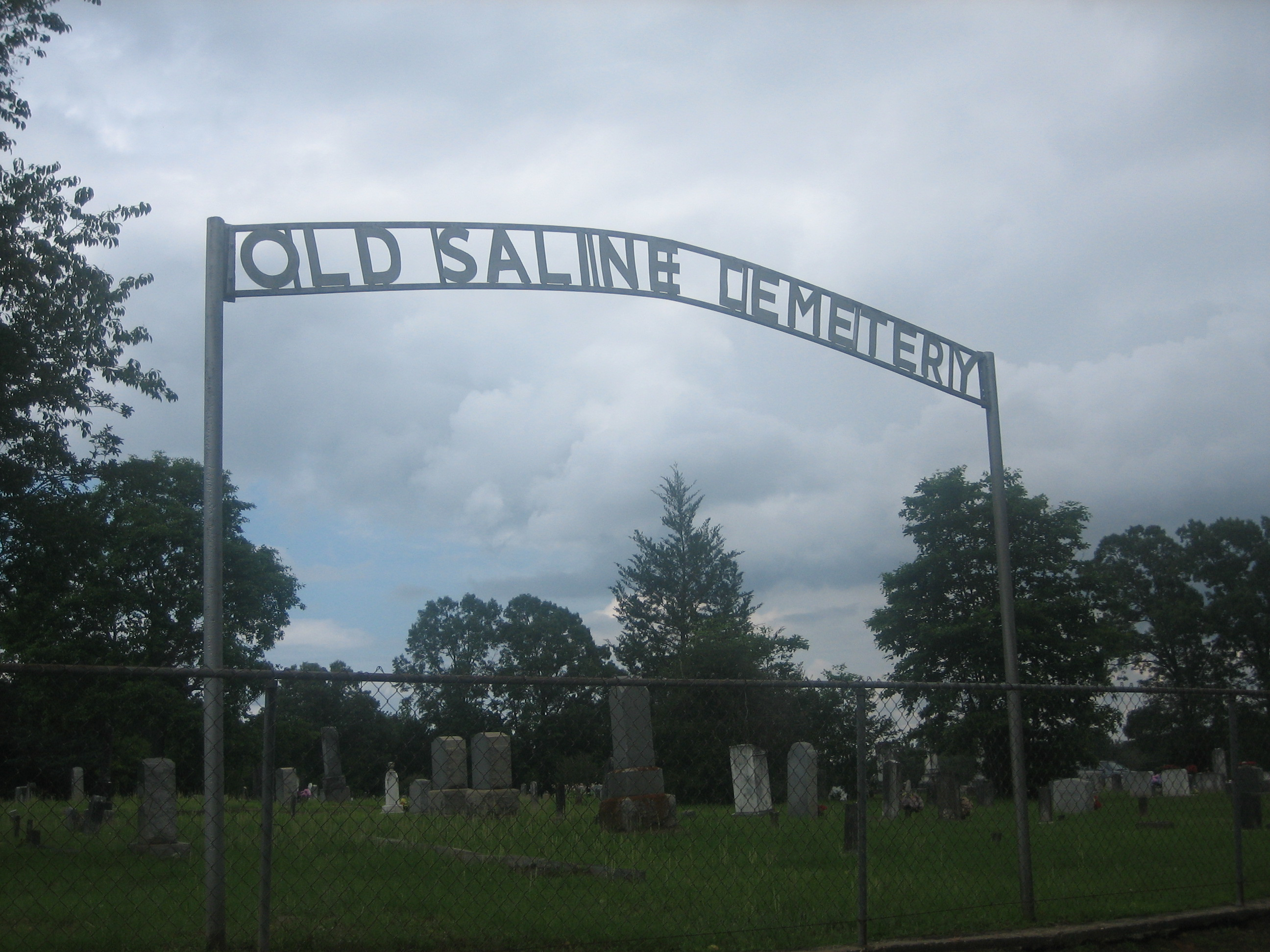
Historic Old Saline Cemetery

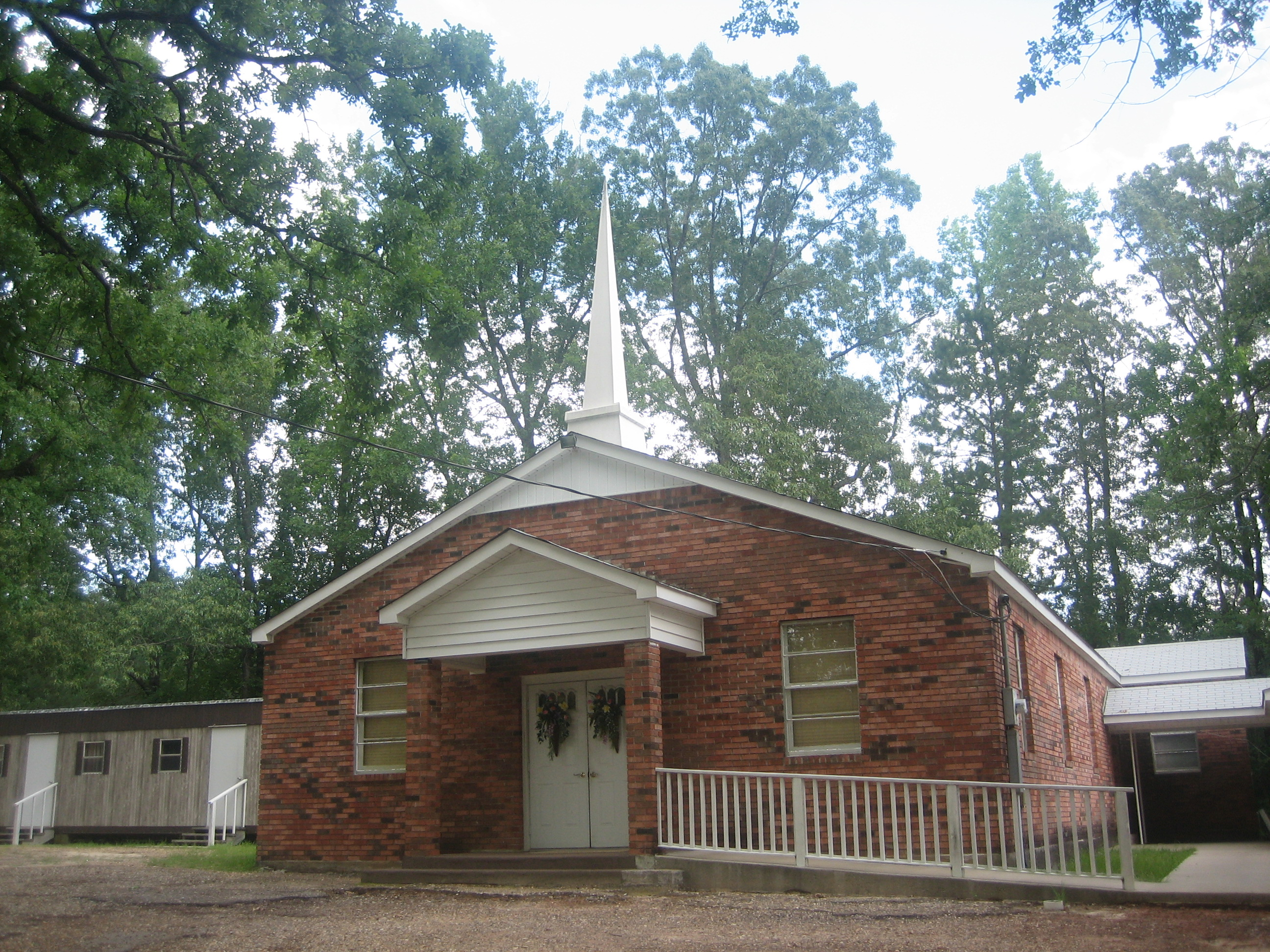
Carolina Baptist Church, with a companion cemetery, is located off Louisiana Highway 155 east of Saline.

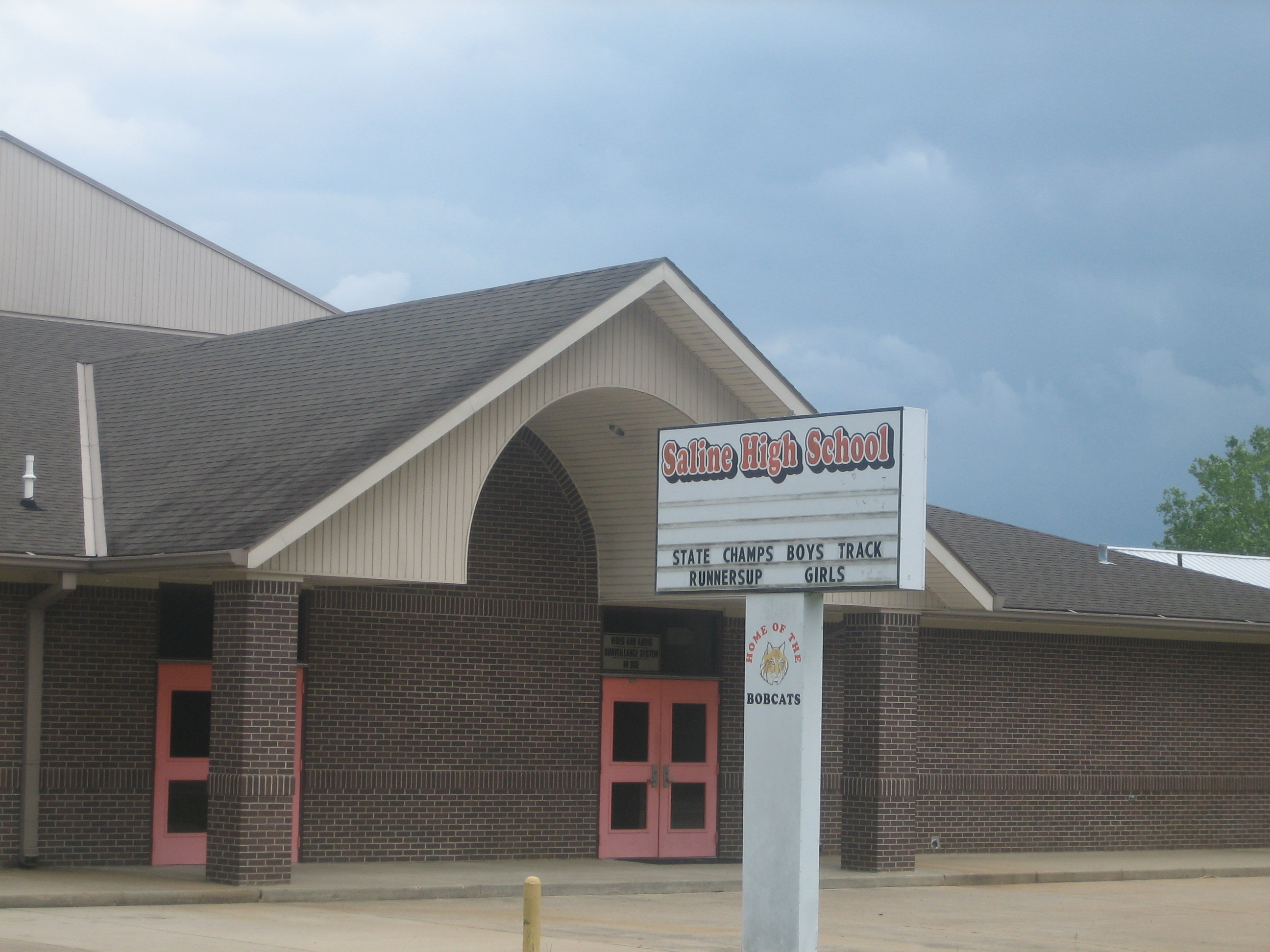
Saline High School is located in a modern building across from Magnolia Baptist Church and Cemetery in Saline.
