= Roy, Louisiana =

Roy Roytown
- Unincorporated community
- Location of Roy in Louisiana Roy (the United States)
- Coordinates: 32°13′27″N 93°09′08″W
- Country: United States
- State: Louisiana
- Parish: Bienville
- Elevation: 200 ft (61 m)
- Time zone: UTC-6 (CST)
  - Summer (DST): UTC-5 (CDT)
- ZIP Code: 71016
- Area code: 318
- GNIS feature ID: 543632

Roy (also known as Roytown) is an unincorporated community located approximately two miles south of Castor in Bienville Parish in northern Louisiana, United States. To the south of Roy is Ashland in Natchitoches Parish. Named for Roy Otis Martin, Sr. (1890-1973), the community was the location of a closed sawmill owned and operated by the Martin Timber Company based in Alexandria, Louisiana, and operated by Martin's son, Roy O. Martin, Jr., and then his grandson, Roy O. Martin III, until sold to Hunt Plywood in 1992.

== History ==
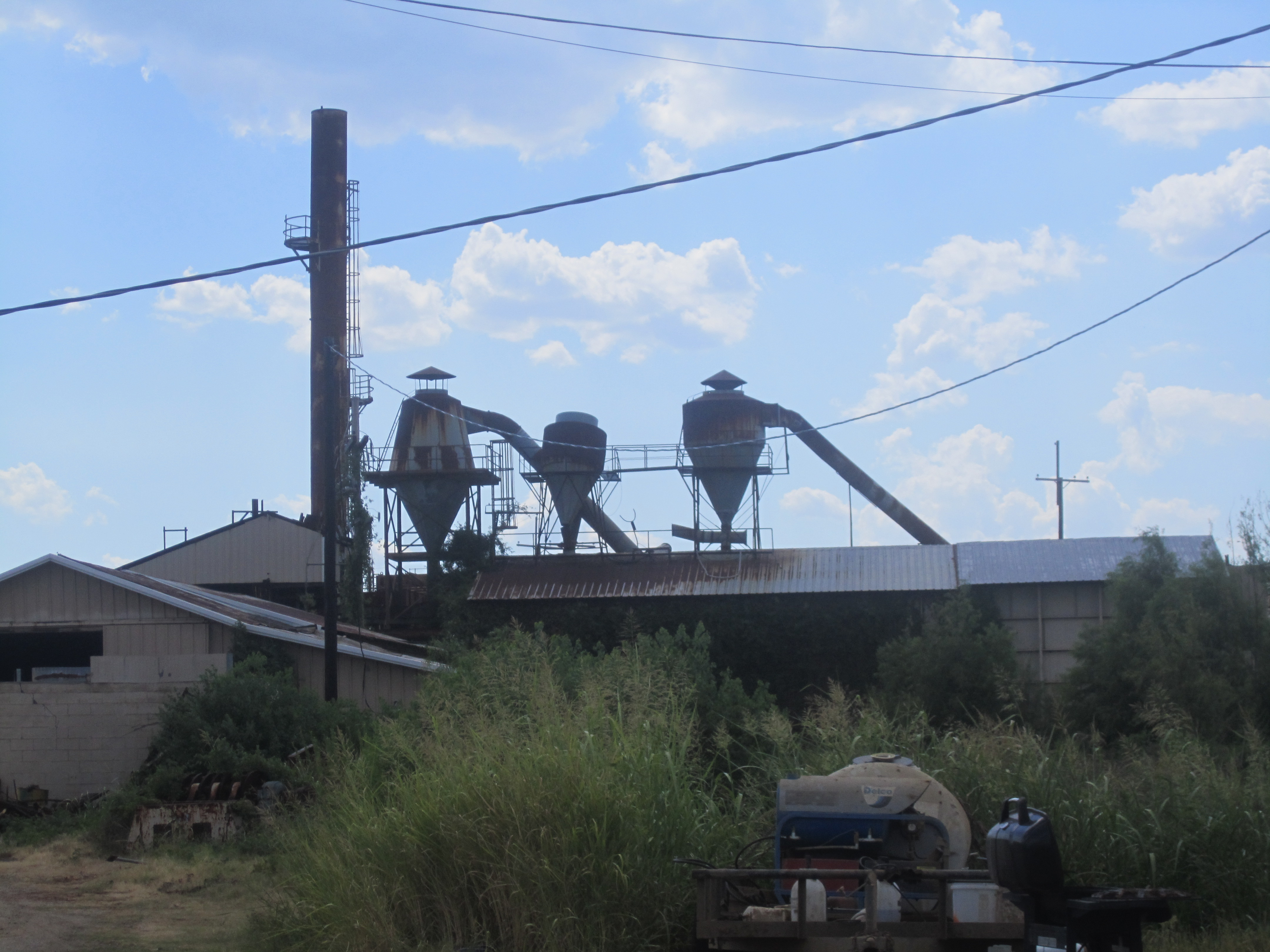
The former Martin Lumber Company sawmill in Roy, Louisiana

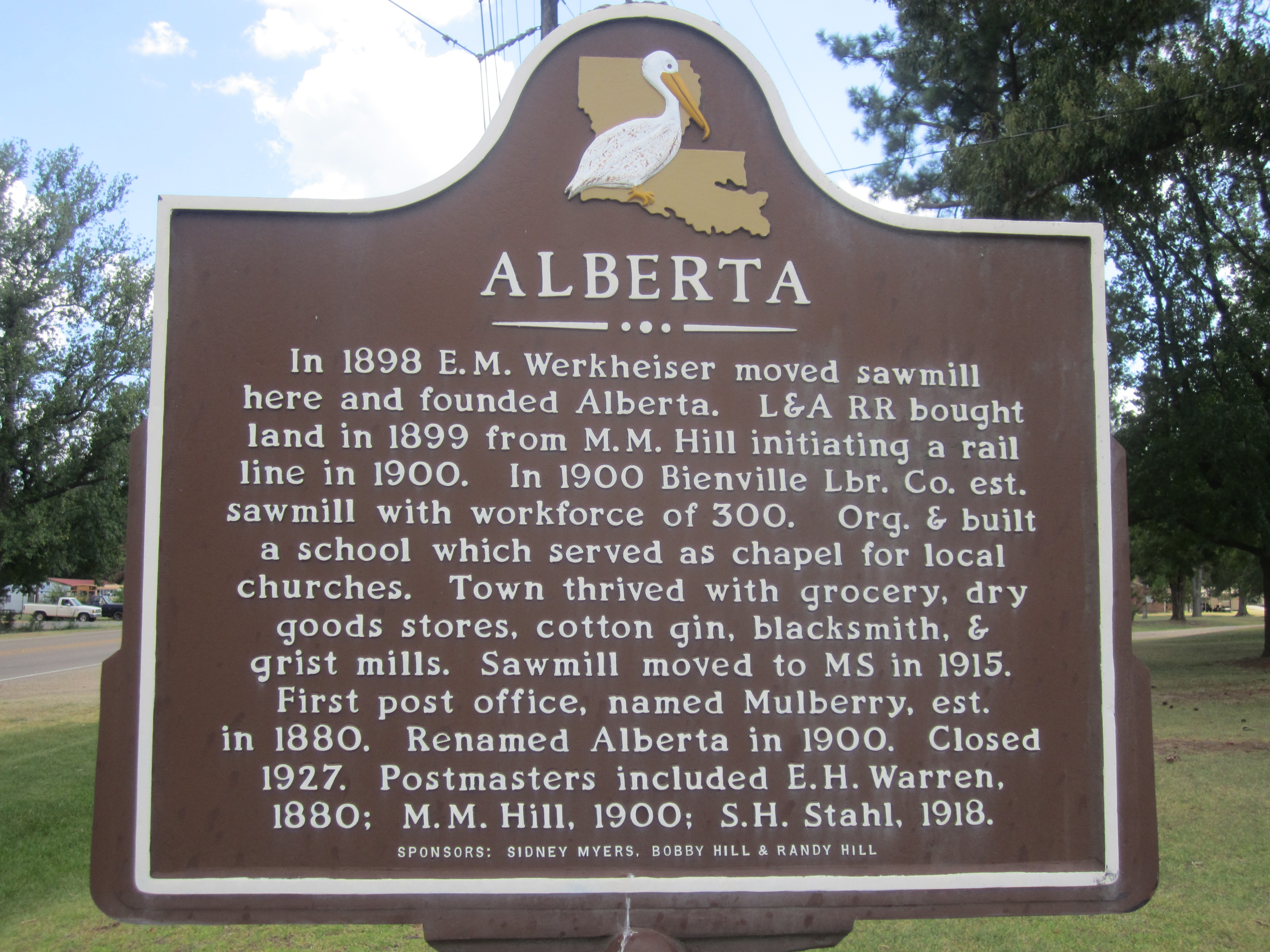
Historical marker, Alberta, Louisiana

From 1898 to 1927, the Alberta community thrived just north of Roy. Alberta began when E. M. Werkheiser established a sawmill, and the Louisiana and Arkansas Railway came into the area. By 1900, some three hundred were employed at a sawmill of the Bienville Lumber Company, which built a school which also served as a chapel for area churches. There was a grocery store, dry goods store, cotton gin, blacksmith shop, and several gristmills. In 1915, the sawmill was moved to Mississippi. A post office operated in Alberta until 1927

Later, across from the Martin company sawmill were a grocery store and a gasoline station. A general store was located about a mile south of the sawmill. During the heyday of the mill, the grocery store was referred to as a commissary of the company town. Housing quarters for the mill workers were constructed along what is now Louisiana Highway 153. Most of those living near the mill worked for the company. The Kansas City Southern Railroad had a track that ran near the sawmill, and a spur line connected the railroad to the sawmill to facilitate shipping of the lumber.

In 1952, a tornado, spiraling from the direction of Black Lake Bayou, destroyed the sawmill and housing quarters, but the gas station, grocery store, and nearby general store survived the storm. The sawmill was rebuilt and remained operational until November 2000, when low lumber prices caused the closure of the sawmill by Hunt Forest Products, the then owner of the sawmill.

== Present day ==
Most of the Roy area, formerly open country, is now a dense thicket. Existing businesses include a gas station and a bar.

Roy uses the same ZIP code and telephone numbers as the residents of Castor. Pupils from Roy attend Castor High School.

== Geography ==
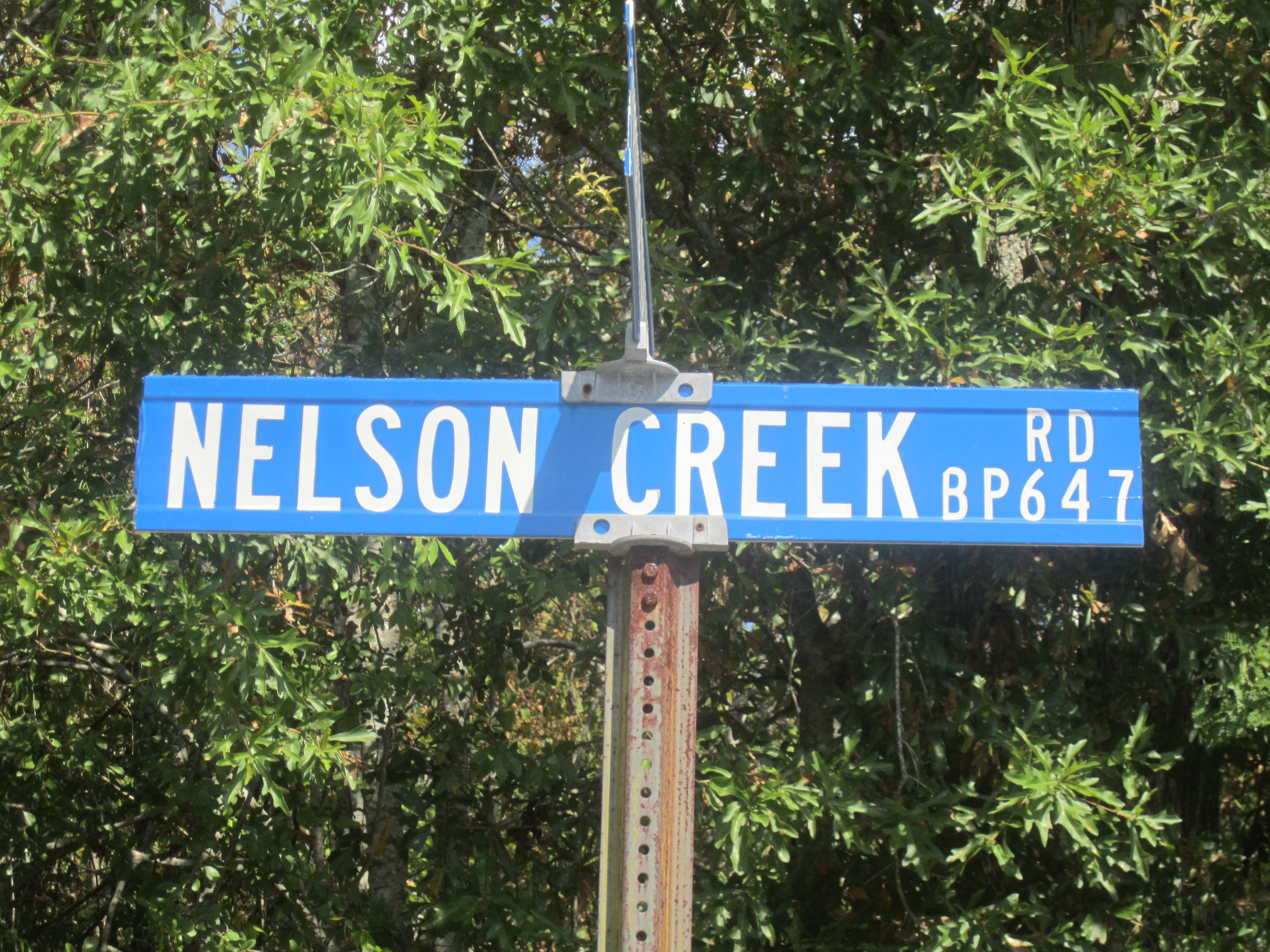
Nelson Creek Road sign

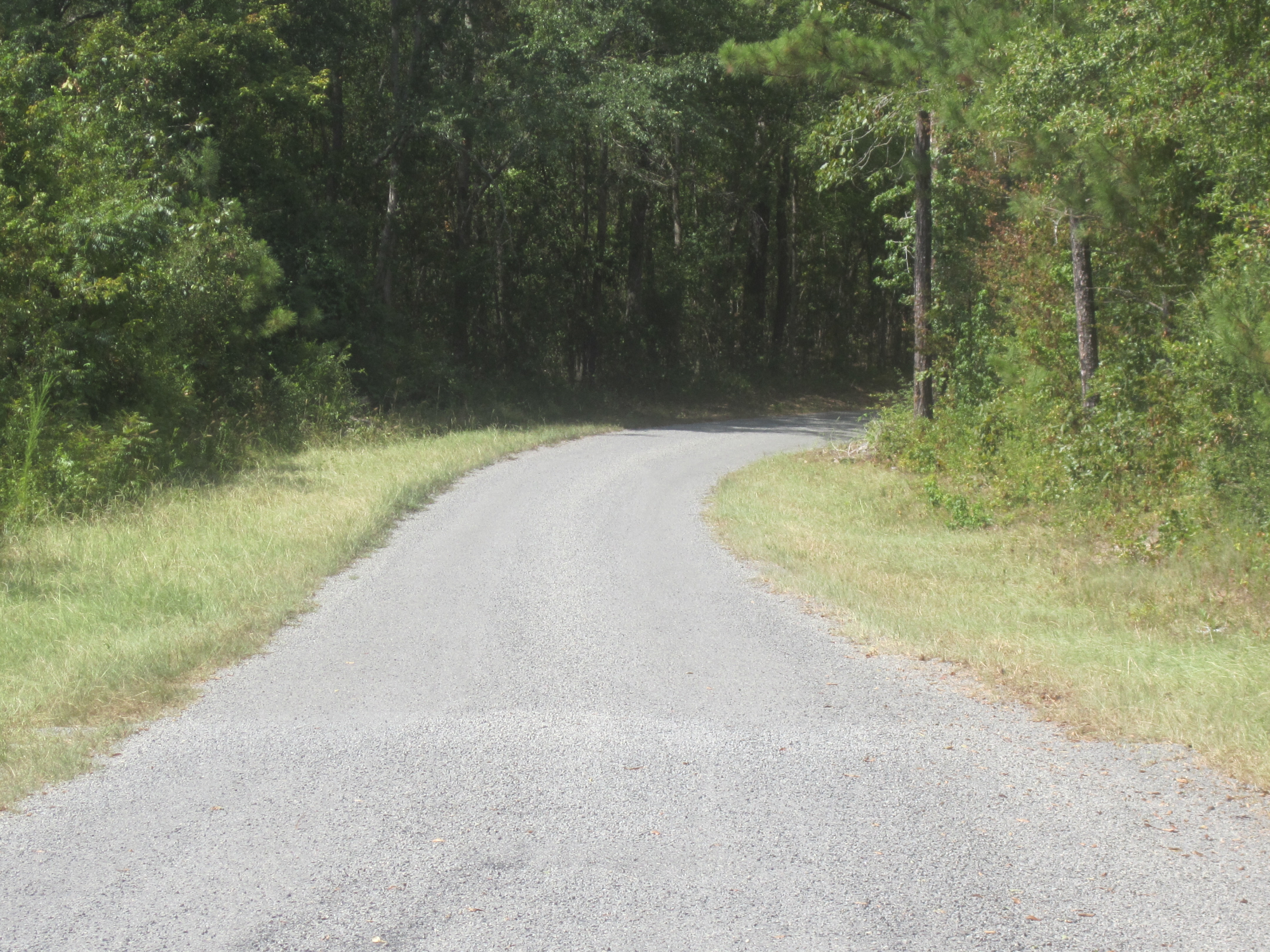
Nelson Creek Road, named for the Nelson family who settled west of Roy in the early 20th century, is among the rural roads of Bienville Parish.

Nelson Creek, a branch of Black Lake Bayou, traverses Roy.

== Roads ==
Besides Highway 153, the Punkin Center, and Sawmill roads provide access to Roy.
