= Castor, Louisiana =

- Village
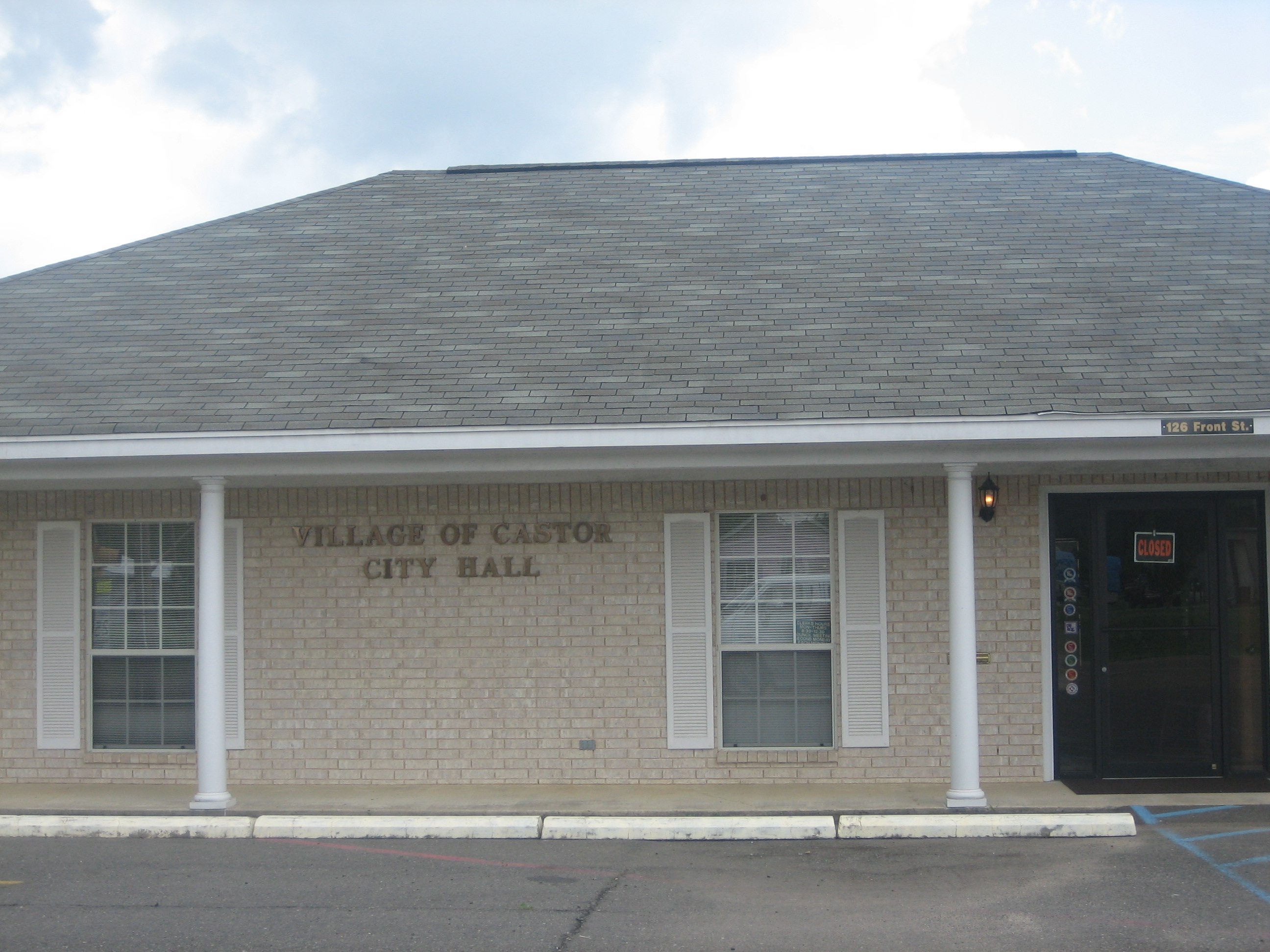
- Castor Village Hall

- Location of Castor in Bienville Parish, Louisiana.

- Location of Louisiana in the United States
- Coordinates: 32°15′06″N 93°09′54″W
- Country: United States
- State: Louisiana
- Parish: Bienville

Area
  - Total: 1.19 sq mi (3.08 km^{2})
  - Land: 1.19 sq mi (3.08 km^{2})
  - Water: 0 sq mi (0.00 km^{2})
- Elevation: 180 ft (55 m)

Population (2020)
  - Total: 230
  - Density: 193.2/sq mi (74.58/km^{2})
- Time zone: UTC-6 (CST)
  - Summer (DST): UTC-5 (CDT)
- ZIP code: 71016
- Area code: 318
- FIPS code: 22-13260
- GNIS feature ID: 2407427

Castor is a village in Bienville Parish in north Louisiana, United States. As of the 2020 census, Castor had a population of 230. The median age was 32.2 years. The village was established in 1900. The name "Castor" refers to the genus Castoridae or beaver, a Latin term, contrary to an oral tradition of the word being Native American in origin.

Castor's ZIP code is 71016. A number of surrounding smaller villages, both incorporated and not, including Roy, utilize the ZIP code of Castor.

== History ==
During the Civil War, Castor supplied salt for the Confederacy. A salt works was operated west of Castor by Alfred P. King. Burrell Hicks Matthews and Alfred P. King ran a post office here called "Salt Spring" between 1849 and 1866. The area supplied hundreds of young men as soldiers during the Civil War, including the Castor Guards and the Bienville Rifles.

Dr. Dempsey Sullivan was a physician who saw patients from horseback. His daughter, Willie Sullivan, married Sam Smith, and the couple had 21 children. All but one of the children who died are interred at the New Ebenezer Cemetery. Mrs. Bonnie Daniel and Mrs. Merlene Young lived the furthest away in Weatherford and Kerrville, Texas, respectively, but they too are buried at Ebenezer.

The Sam and Willie Sullivan Smith family, one of the oldest in Castor, lost six members in a tornado in 1950. Mr. and Mrs. Smith, Elaine Smith, Celia Sullivan (Mrs. Smith's sister), Dottie Jo Knotts, and Prentice Little were all killed. The homestead was wiped clean except for a bucket on the water well which remained undisturbed. The Smith family sold most of its land to Jerry "Cotton" Guin, an employee of Libbey Glass in Shreveport, who raised bees there until 2009.

The Louisiana rails to trails project, which extends from Sibley to Winnfield, deconstructed the once Kansas City Southern Railway track to make a recreational nature trail that, on completion, runs through the center of Castor.

The first school in Castor was located in the former Masonic lodge near the site of the present United Methodist Church. By 1912, Castor State Bank joined a small group of businesses on North Front Street. The bank and other buildings burned in 1929. A new bank building, a two-story brick structure, opened with the upper floor reserved for the Masonic lodge. This bank closed in 1933, but the top floor was still maintained by the lodge and the Order of the Eastern Star, which had been chartered in Castor on June 6, 1912. In the winter of 1983, fire destroyed this building, and the lodge records were lost. A new lodge hall was constructed in 1985 across from the Methodist Church.

In the late evening of April 23, 2000, Castor was struck by a tornado with a half-mile-wide path of destruction, which caused massive damage. There were no severe injuries, but the infrastructure damage caused the closure of most small businesses as well as the public school for a period of weeks. Most of the affected buildings were demolished or renovated because of the severe damage.

Discovered in 2007–2008, the Haynesville Shale, one of the largest natural gas deposits in the United States, sits underneath northwest Louisiana, including Castor. A large pocket of the Haynesville Shale was developed at the edge of the village, but an industrial/production accident involving the site damaged the pocket, making it unusable for the time being.

== Geography ==
According to the United States Census Bureau, the village has a total area of 1.2 square miles (3.1 km^{2}), all land.

=== Landscape ===
The active area or center of Castor is the four-way intersection of LA 4/LA 153 and LA 507, but the city limits extend from the light for about a quarter mile in all directions.

Castor Creek is a tributary of Black Lake Bayou, which flows approximately 4 miles (6 km) southwest of Castor.

== Demographics ==
Historical population
Census	Pop.	Note	%±
1930	256		—
1940	244		−4.7%
1950	171		−29.9%
1960	142		−17.0%
1970	183		28.9%
1980	195		6.6%
1990	196		0.5%
2000	209		6.6%
2010	258		23.4%
2020	230		−10.9%
2025 (est.)	219	▼	−4.8%
U.S. Decennial Census

As of the census of 2000, there were 209 people, 88 households, and 52 families residing in the village. The population density was 174.6 inhabitants per square mile (67.4/km^{2}). There were 101 housing units at an average density of 84.4 per square mile (32.6/km^{2}). The racial makeup of the village was 85.17% White, 11.96% African American, 2.87% from other races. Hispanic or Latino of any race were 3.83% of the population.

There were 88 households, out of which 30.7% had children under the age of 18 living with them, 46.6% were married couples living together, 10.2% had a female householder with no husband present, and 39.8% were non-families. 38.6% of all households were made up of individuals, and 23.9% had someone living alone who was 65 years of age or older. The average household size was 2.38 and the average family size was 3.25.

In the village, the population was spread out, with 30.1% under the age of 18, 5.3% from 18 to 24, 30.1% from 25 to 44, 14.8% from 45 to 64, and 19.6% who were 65 years of age or older. The median age was 36 years. For every 100 females, there were 97.2 males. For every 100 females age 18 and over, there were 87.2 males.

The median income for a household in the village was $23,125, and the median income for a family was $35,000. Males had a median income of $23,750 versus $35,833 for females. The per capita income for the village was $11,963. About 17.3% of families and 20.3% of the population were below the poverty line, including 20.8% of those under the age of eighteen and 15.7% of those 65 or over.

== Gallery ==
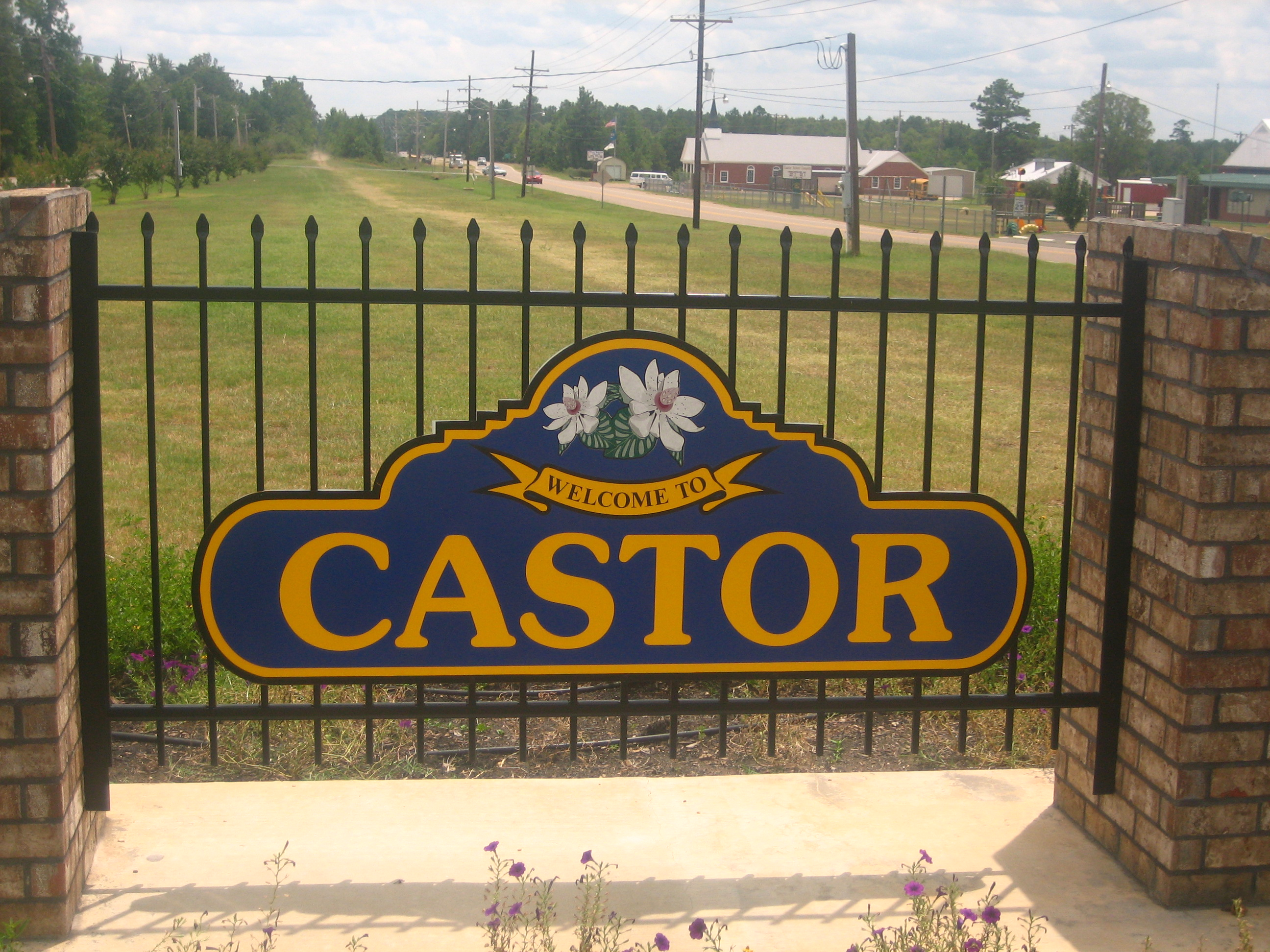
Castor entrance sign

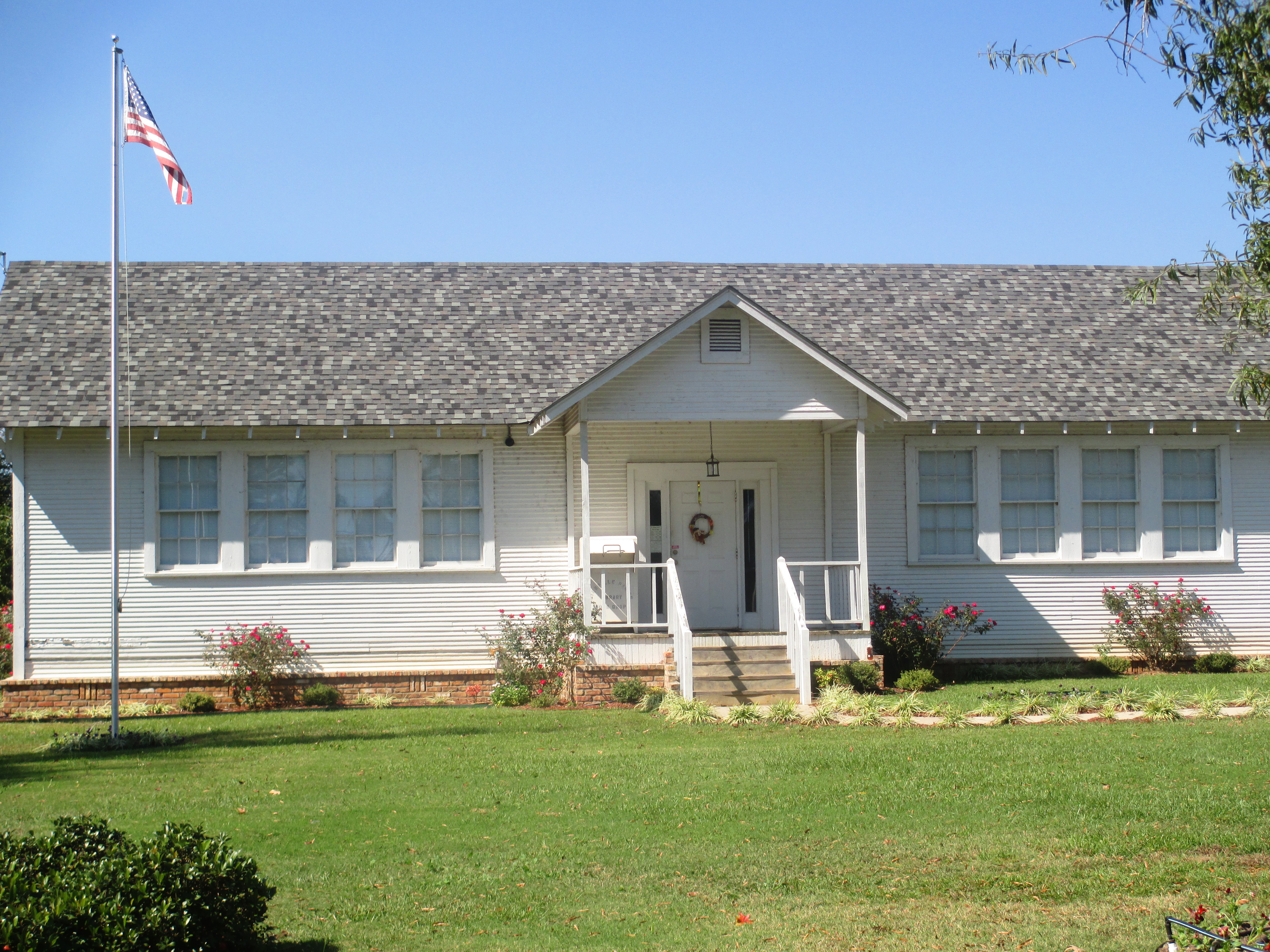
Castor branch of the Bienville Parish Library

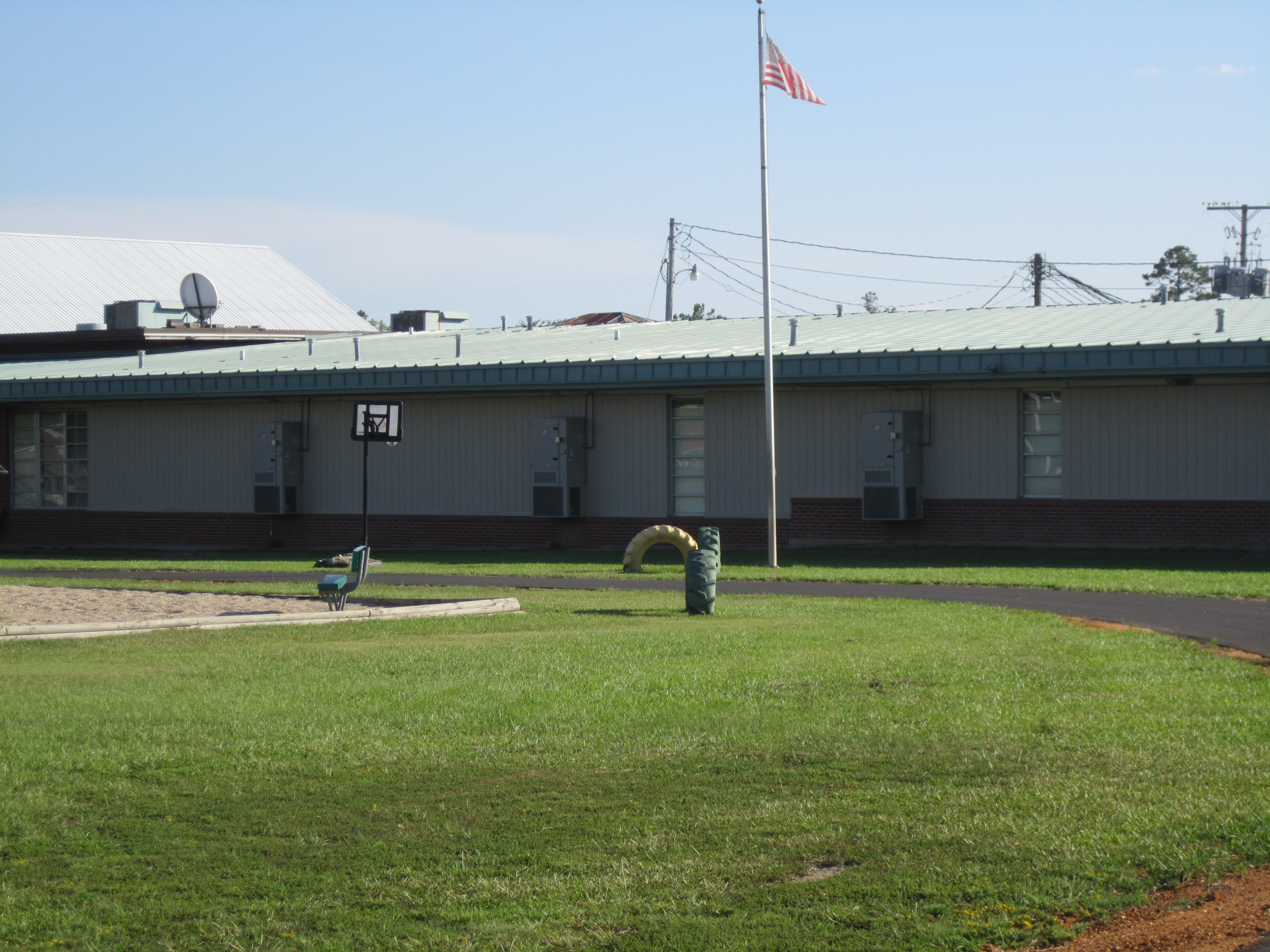
Castor School Complex

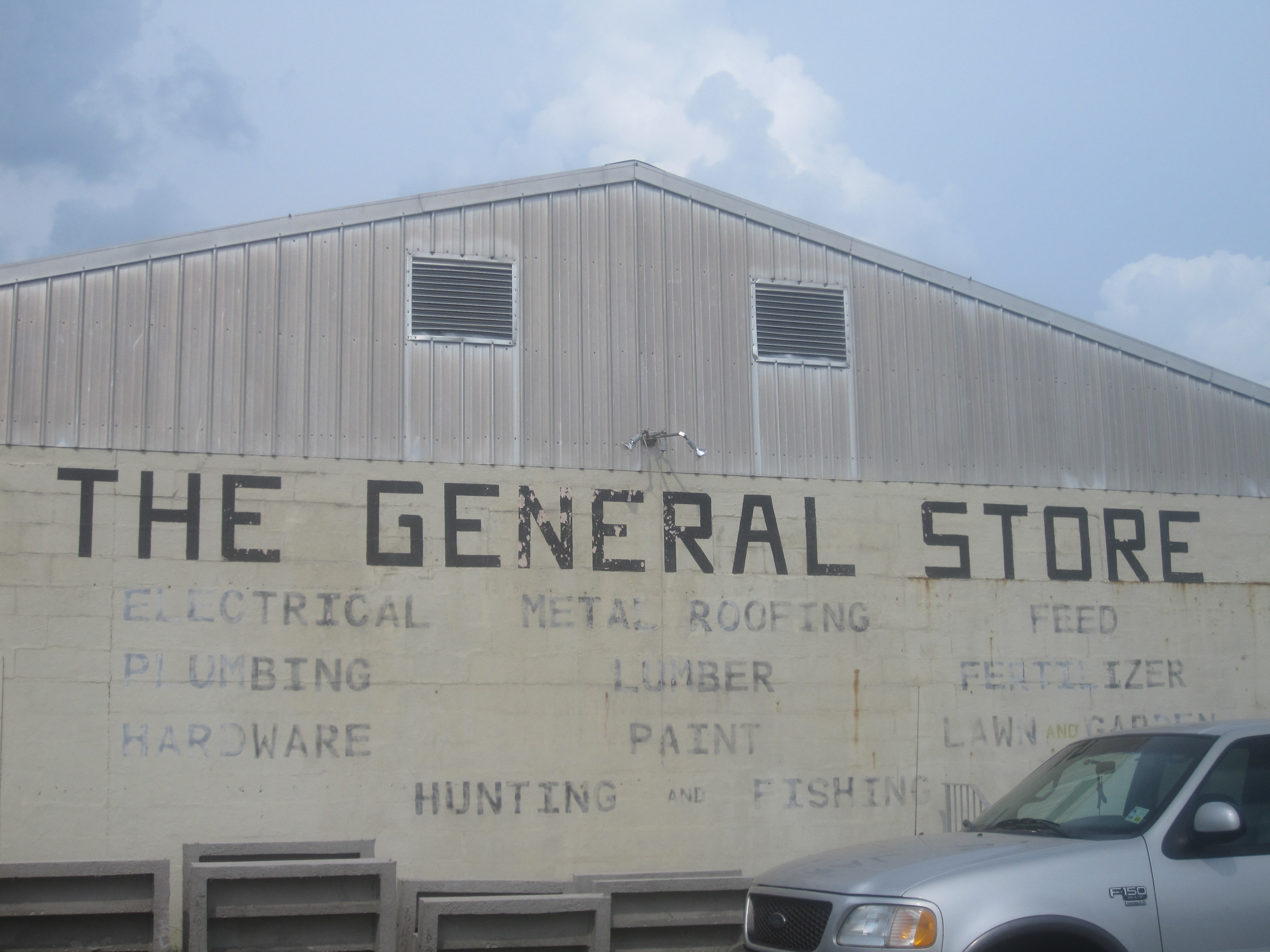
Castor General Store

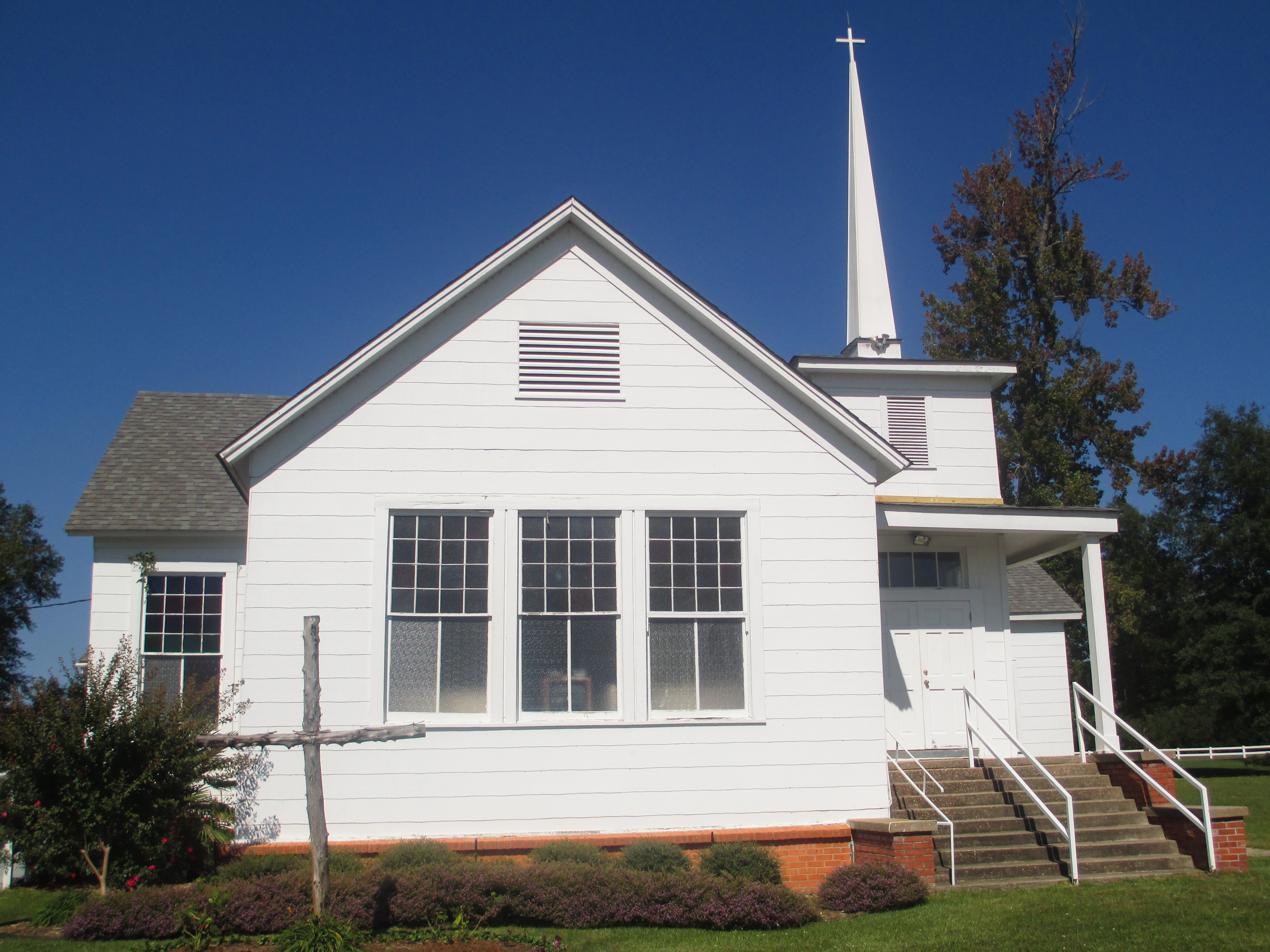
First United Methodist Church of Castor

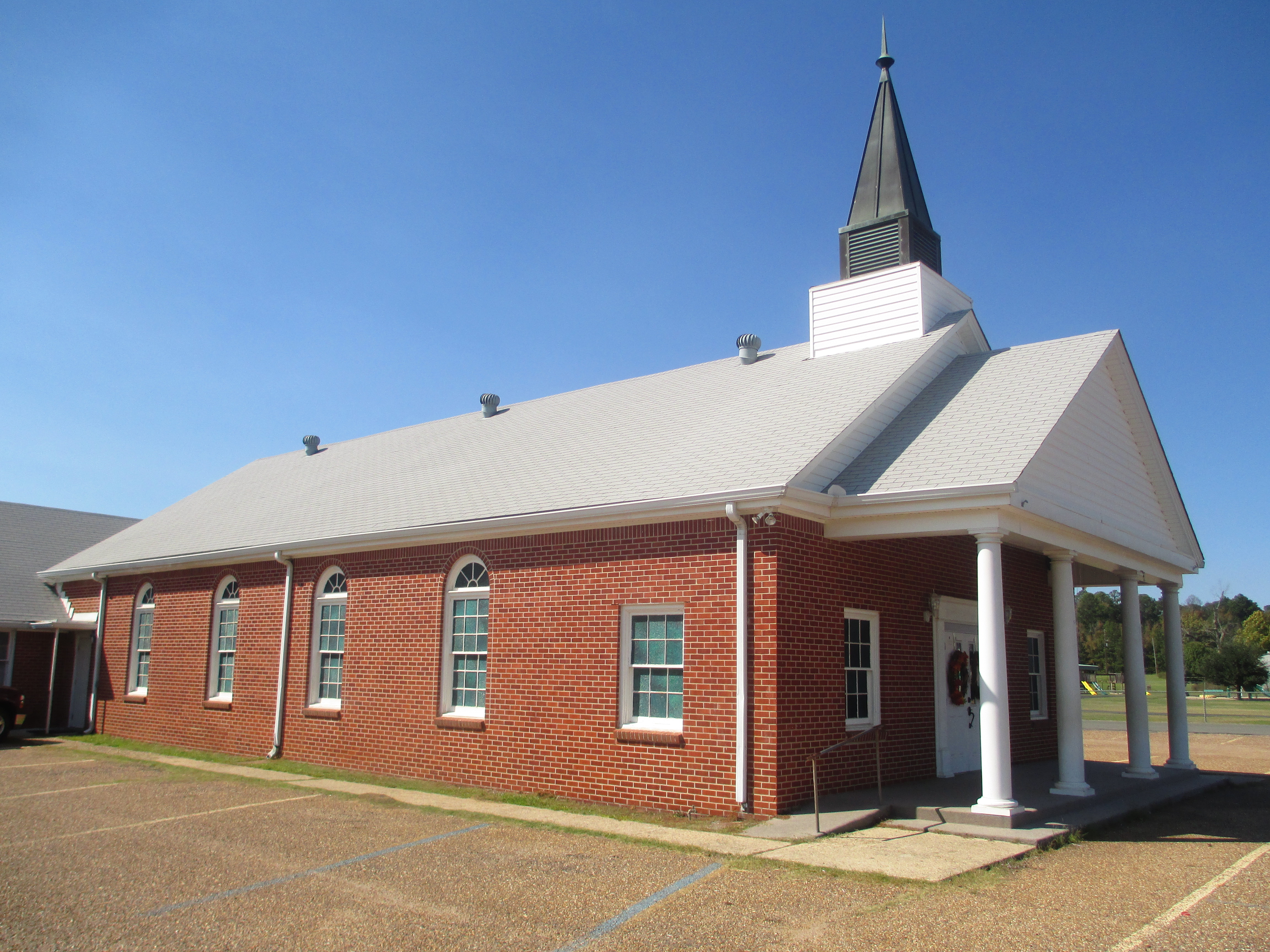
The First Baptist Church of Castor is located adjacent to the public school complex.

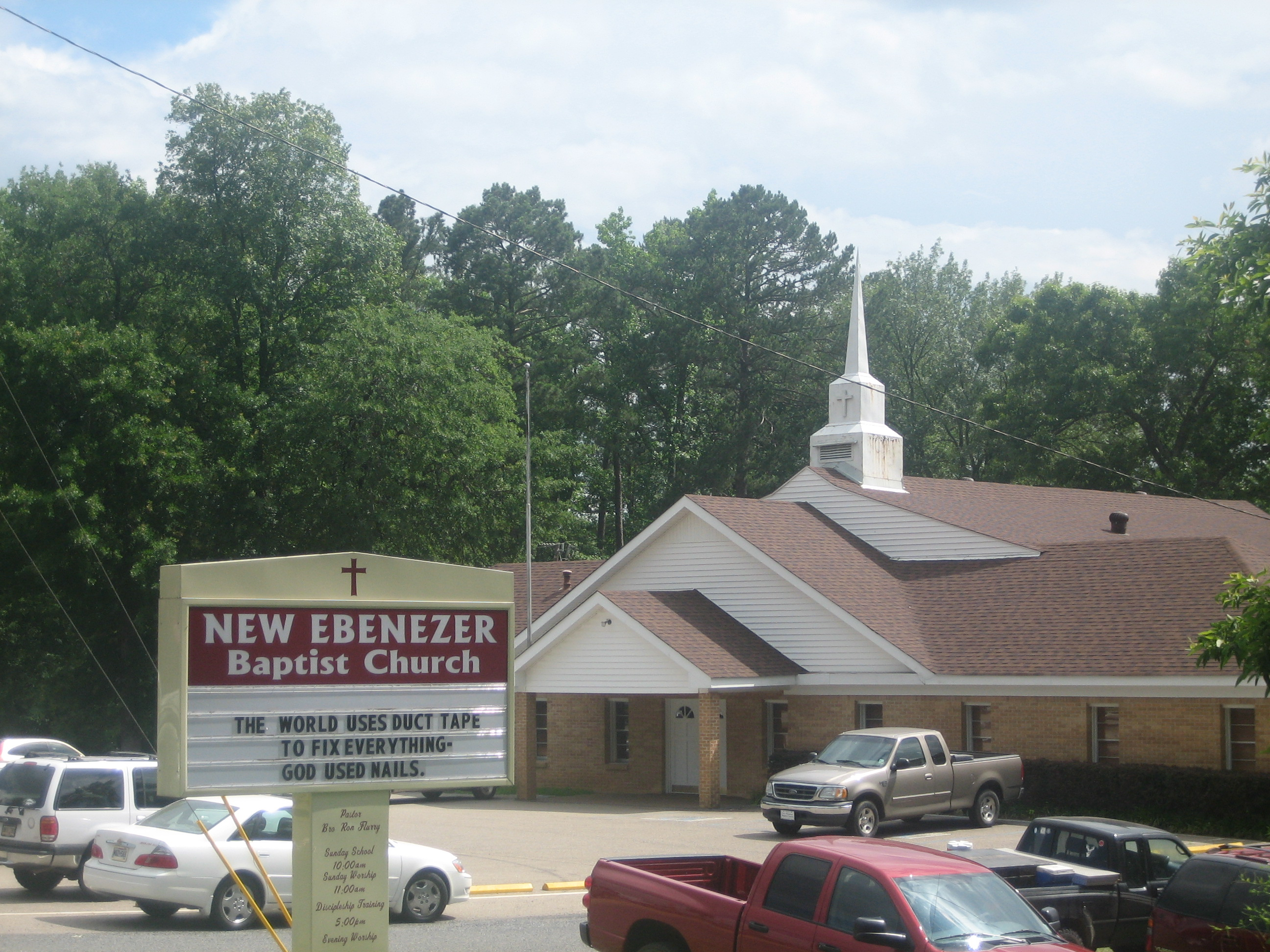
New Ebenezer Baptist Church south of Castor

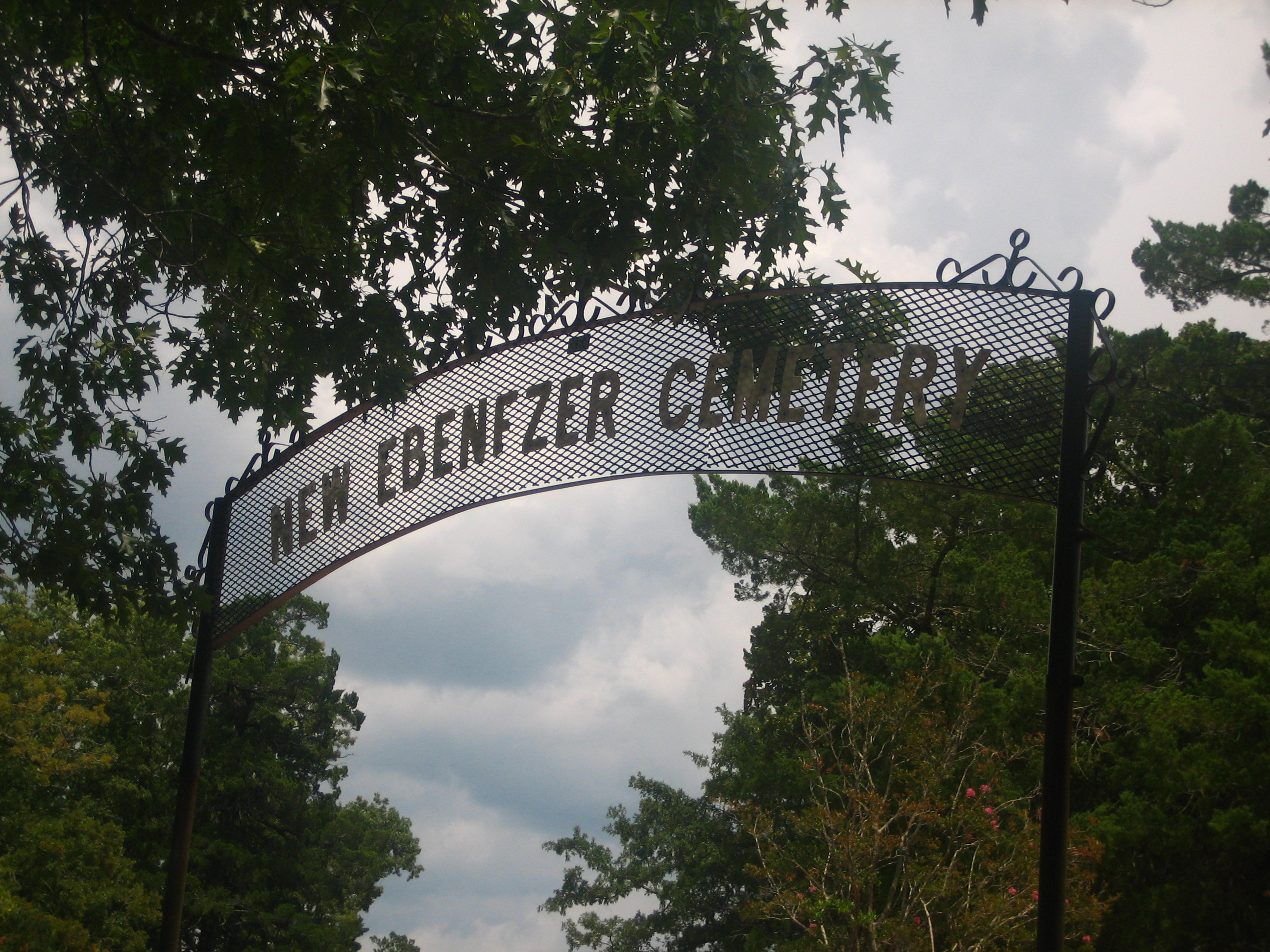
Entrance to New Ebenezer Cemetery

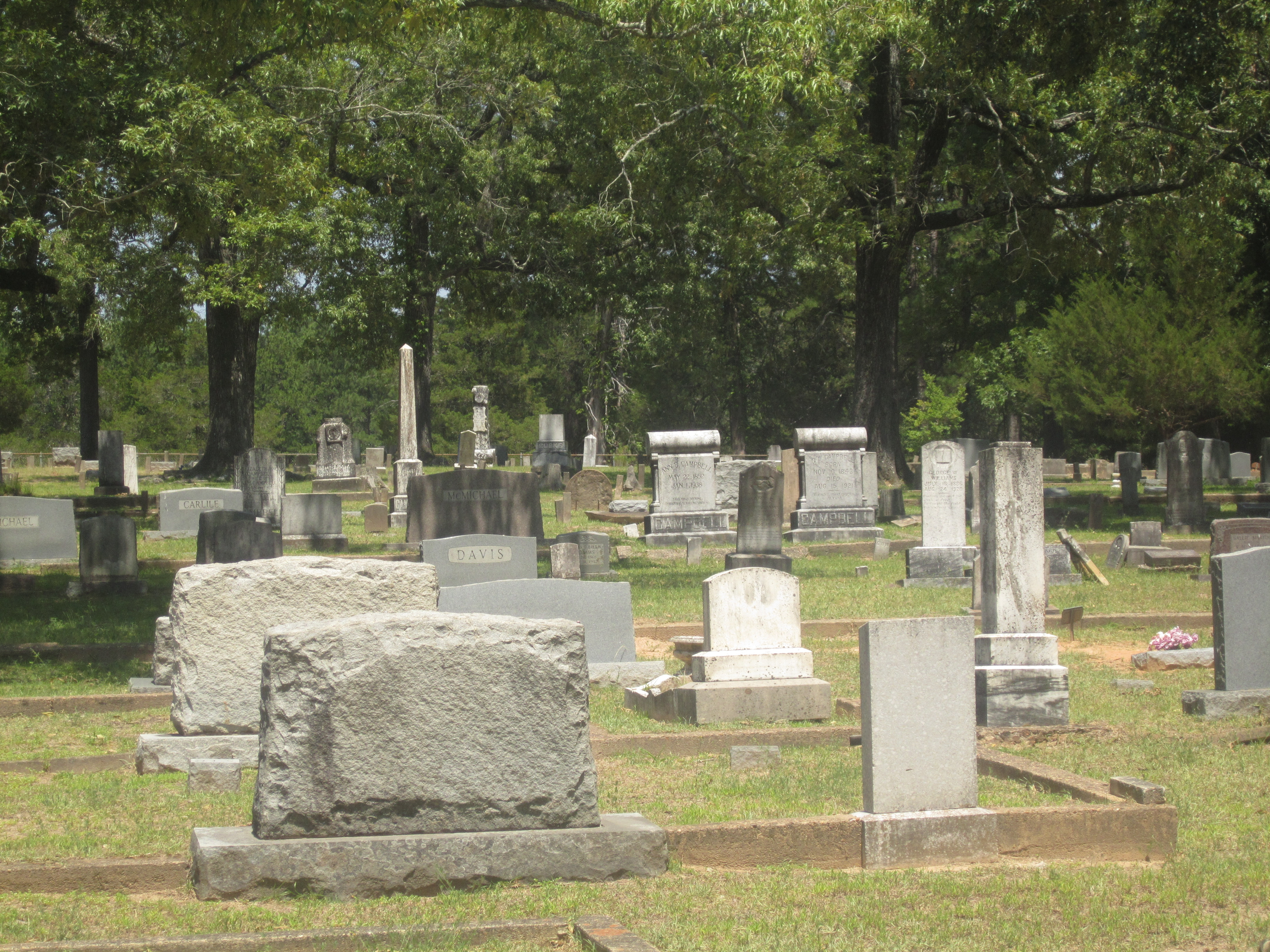
Graves at the Old Castor Cemetery

== Education ==
Castor has one school located on Front Street, called Castor High School. The complex contains a Pre-K and Kindergarten, elementary, middle, and high school buildings.

== Roads ==
Running through Castor are three main highways: Hwy 153 (known in Castor as Front Street), Hwy 507 and Hwy 4 which intersect in the middle of Castor at a 4-way-stop caution light.

== Media ==
The primary source of news in Castor is the Shreveport Times. There are also the Ringgold Progress and the Bienville Democrat, which is published in Arcadia.

Cable television does not reach into Castor area. Viewers rely on antennas or satellites for coverage.

== Economy ==
Castor has several businesses: the General Store, a gasoline station, flower shop, a cafe, a beauty shop, a laundromat, a branch of the Bank of Montgomery (formerly Bank of Ringgold), United States Post Office, retirement homes, and a mobile home park. The majority of working adults commute to one of the more urban areas nearby for employment.

== Notable people ==
- Jamie Fair, member of the Louisiana House of Representatives from 1980 to 1984
- Lee Smith, pitcher, Major League Baseball, inducted into the Hall of Fame in 2019
