= Taylor, Louisiana =

- Unincorporated community
- Location within Louisiana Location within the United States
- Coordinates: 32°32′45″N 93°07′10″W
- Country: United States
- State: Louisiana
- Parish: Bienville
- Elevation: 223 ft (68 m)
- Time zone: UTC-6 (Central (CST))
  - Summer (DST): UTC-5 (CDT)
- ZIP code: 71080
- Area code: 318
- GNIS feature ID: 543715

Taylor is an unincorporated community in Bienville Parish, Louisiana, United States. Its ZIP code is 71080.
