= Brown, Louisiana =

Unincorporated community in Louisiana, U.S.

Coordinates: 32°10′40″N 93°03′04″W

Brown is an unincorporated community in Bienville Parish, Louisiana, United States.

== History ==
Brown was named for George W. Brown, the original owner of the town site.
