= Garnie W. McGinty =

American historian (1900–1984)

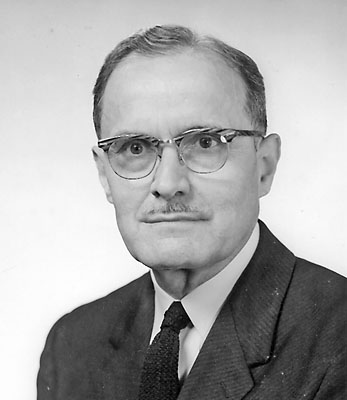
- Born: April 5, 1900; Ringgold, Louisiana, U.S.
- Died: April 22, 1984 (aged 84); Shreveport, Louisiana, U.S.
- Education: Louisiana Normal College (BA); Peabody College (MA; University of Texas at Austin PhD)
- Occupations: Author; essayist; historian; professor
- Notable work: Louisiana Redeemed: The Overthrow of Carpet-Bag Rule 1876-1880 (1941)
- Spouse: Zoe Heard McGinty (m. 1932; died 1976)

Garnie William McGinty (April 5, 1900 – April 22, 1984) was a historian whose career was principally based for thirty-five years at Louisiana Tech University in Ruston, Louisiana.

== Biography ==
McGinty was born in Bienville Parish in north Louisiana between Ringgold and Bienville to Alonzo Eugene McGinty and the former Maude Leshe. He was educated in local schools and attended Baptist-affiliated Louisiana College in Pineville and received his Bachelor of Arts degree from Northwestern State University in Natchitoches. He procured the Master of Arts degree from Peabody College in Nashville, Tennessee. He also studied at Vanderbilt University in Nashville and the University of Chicago in Illinois before he received his Ph.D. from the University of Texas at Austin. The U.S. Congress declared war on Germany one day after McGinty's seventeenth birthday. He was hence part of the Student Army Training Corps during World War I.

Early in his academic career, McGinty was the principal of elementary schools in Red River, Claiborne, and Pointe Coupee parishes. He was also the principal of a secondary school in De Soto Parish south of Shreveport. McGinty taught at the college level for a half-century, having served at Western Kentucky University in Bowling Green, Kentucky, Northwestern State (then known as Louisiana Normal College), Louisiana Tech (then Louisiana Polytechnic Institute), and the University of Montevallo in Montevallo in central Alabama. He headed the social sciences, later history, department at Louisiana Tech for thirty-five years. He was succeeded in the history chairmanship by William Y. Thompson, a native of Baton Rouge who specialized in Civil War and southern studies. McGinty also served for a year as the acting president of NSU, his alma mater. Upon his retirement from Louisiana Tech, he was appointed professor emeritus. The McGinty Chair of History was established by Louisiana Tech in his honor. Similar chairs honor Thompson and John D. Winters, another specialist in the Civil War. Scholarships are also named for McGinty as is the Louisiana Tech publications division.

In 1962, McGinty was elected by his colleagues as the fifth president of the reorganized Louisiana Historical Association. In 1971, three years prior to the opening of Louisiana Downs in Bossier City, McGinty published "Horse-racing in North Louisiana, 1911–1914," in the journal, North Louisiana History, a twice-annual publication of the North Louisiana Historical Association, an organization which he formerly headed.

During his 50-year teaching career, McGinty wrote forty essays and articles, fifty book reviews, and five books. His A History of Louisiana was used as a college textbook for two decades. Another popular work is Louisiana Redeemed: The Overthrow of Carpetbag Rule, 1876–1880, a 1941 study of the Reconstruction era, which ends with the triumph of the Redeemers, the southern Democrats who defeated the Radical Republican administrations across the South.

McGinty was listed in Who's Who in Education, The Dictionary of International Scholars, and Men of Achievement. On July 15, 1932, McGinty married the former Zoé Heard (1902–1976) of Ruston. The couple had no children. McGinty had a brother, Thomas Guice McGinty (1893–1983) of Sibley, a state government employee who twice ran for sheriff of his adopted Webster Parish.

McGinty was a brother-in-law of Charles Raymond Heard (1896–1963), a prominent wholesale grocer in Ruston who served on the Louisiana State Board of Education prior to 1960, when he was unseated in the Democratic primary election by later U.S. Representative Joe Waggonner of Louisiana's 4th congressional district.

== Works ==
- — (30 April 1999) [1941]. Louisiana Redeemed: The Overthrow of Carpet-Bag Rule 1876-1880 (First ed.). Firebird Press. ISBN 978-1-56-554614-1. LCCN 42000810. OCLC 54951437. OL 8665309M – via Google Books.

Preceded by Joseph G. Tregle Jr.	President of the Louisiana Historical Association; 1962–1963	Succeeded by Walter M. Lowrey
