= William Y. Thompson =

American historian

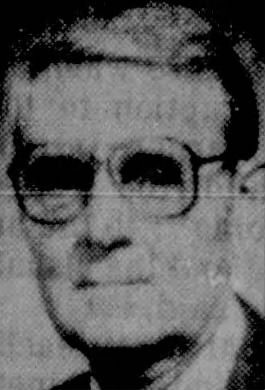
- Thompson in 1986
- Born: William Young Thompson; October 15, 1922; Baton Rouge, Louisiana, U.S.
- Died: April 12, 2013 (aged 90); Monroe, Louisiana, U.S.
- Education: University of Alabama; Emory University; University of North Carolina at Chapel Hill
- Occupation: Historian

William Young Thompson (October 15, 1922 – April 12, 2013) was an American historian.

== Life and career ==
Thompson was born in Baton Rouge, Louisiana, the son of a Presbyterian minister. He attended the University of Alabama, earning his BA degree. He also earned his MA degree at Emory University, and his PhD degree in American history at the University of North Carolina at Chapel Hill. After earning his degree, he served in the United States Air Force Reserve during World War II, and awarded the Distinguished Flying Cross.

Thompson served as a professor in the department of history at Louisiana Tech University from 1955 to 1988. During his years as a professor, in 1986, he was named the Garnie W. McGinty Chair Professor of History.

== Death ==
Thompson died at the St. Francis Hospital in Monroe, Louisiana on April 12, 2013, at the age of 90.
