= Bienville, Louisiana =

- Village
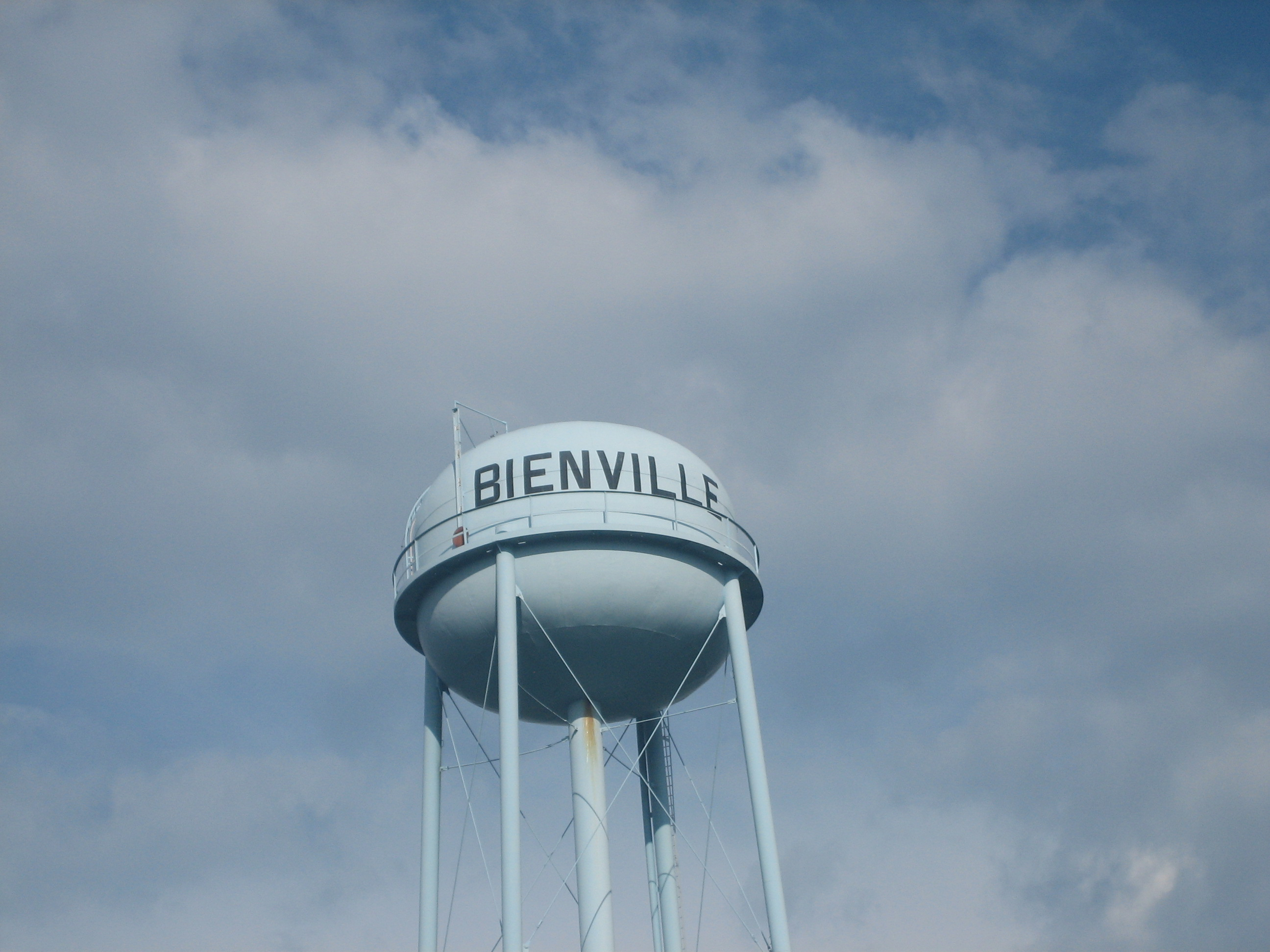
- Water tower in Bienville

- Location of Bienville in Bienville Parish, Louisiana.

- Location of Louisiana in the United States
- Coordinates: 32°22′25″N 92°58′46″W
- Country: United States
- State: Louisiana
- Parish: Bienville

Area
  - Total: 11.05 sq mi (28.62 km^{2})
  - Land: 11.04 sq mi (28.59 km^{2})
  - Water: 0.015 sq mi (0.04 km^{2})
- Elevation: 240 ft (73 m)

Population (2020)
  - Total: 191
  - Density: 17.3/sq mi (6.68/km^{2})
- Time zone: UTC-6 (CST)
  - Summer (DST): UTC-5 (CDT)
- Area code: 318
- FIPS code: 22-07205
- GNIS feature ID: 2407418

Bienville is a village in Bienville Parish, Louisiana, United States. As of the 2020 census, Bienville had a population of 191.

== History ==
Bienville was established in 1891 when the railroad was extended to that point. It took its name from Bienville Parish.

== Geography ==
Bienville is located near the center of Bienville Parish.

According to the United States Census Bureau, the village has a total area of 11.0 square miles (28.6 km^{2}), of which 0.015 square miles (0.04 km^{2}), or 0.13%, is water.

=== Climate ===
This climatic region is typified by warm to hot (and often humid) summers and mild winters. According to the Köppen Climate Classification system, Bienville has a humid subtropical climate, abbreviated "Cfa" on climate maps.

Climate data for Bienville 3 NE, Louisiana (1991–2020 normals, extremes 1972–present)
Month	Jan	Feb	Mar	Apr	May	Jun	Jul	Aug	Sep	Oct	Nov	Dec	Year
Record high °F (°C)	81 (27)	87 (31)	93 (34)	93 (34)	101 (38)	102 (39)	106 (41)	109 (43)	109 (43)	98 (37)	85 (29)	87 (31)	109 (43)
Mean daily maximum °F (°C)	57.5 (14.2)	61.3 (16.3)	69.6 (20.9)	76.8 (24.9)	83.7 (28.7)	90.0 (32.2)	93.1 (33.9)	93.4 (34.1)	88.7 (31.5)	78.4 (25.8)	67.2 (19.6)	58.9 (14.9)	76.5 (24.7)
Daily mean °F (°C)	46.7 (8.2)	50.3 (10.2)	57.7 (14.3)	64.7 (18.2)	72.5 (22.5)	79.4 (26.3)	82.4 (28.0)	82.1 (27.8)	76.9 (24.9)	65.8 (18.8)	55.3 (12.9)	48.2 (9.0)	65.2 (18.4)
Mean daily minimum °F (°C)	35.9 (2.2)	39.2 (4.0)	45.9 (7.7)	52.6 (11.4)	61.3 (16.3)	68.7 (20.4)	71.6 (22.0)	70.8 (21.6)	65.1 (18.4)	53.3 (11.8)	43.4 (6.3)	37.4 (3.0)	53.8 (12.1)
Record low °F (°C)	5 (−15)	1 (−17)	15 (−9)	26 (−3)	37 (3)	48 (9)	55 (13)	50 (10)	37 (3)	25 (−4)	15 (−9)	2 (−17)	1 (−17)
Average precipitation inches (mm)	6.19 (157)	5.63 (143)	5.51 (140)	5.93 (151)	5.19 (132)	5.35 (136)	4.18 (106)	3.56 (90)	3.71 (94)	4.84 (123)	4.55 (116)	6.14 (156)	60.78 (1,544)
Average snowfall inches (cm)	0.2 (0.51)	0.1 (0.25)	0.0 (0.0)	0.0 (0.0)	0.0 (0.0)	0.0 (0.0)	0.0 (0.0)	0.0 (0.0)	0.0 (0.0)	0.0 (0.0)	0.0 (0.0)	0.2 (0.51)	0.5 (1.3)
Average precipitation days (≥ 0.01 in)	8.3	7.6	7.7	6.7	7.4	8.1	6.5	6.2	5.6	6.1	6.6	8.2	85.0
Average snowy days (≥ 0.1 in)	0.0	0.1	0.0	0.0	0.0	0.0	0.0	0.0	0.0	0.0	0.0	0.2	0.3
Source: NOAA

== Demographics ==
Historical population
Census	Pop.	Note	%±
1900	263		—
1910	606		130.4%
1920	478		−21.1%
1930	381		−20.3%
1940	357		−6.3%
1950	445		24.6%
1960	305		−31.5%
1970	287		−5.9%
1980	249		−13.2%
1990	316		26.9%
2000	262		−17.1%
2010	218		−16.8%
2020	191		−12.4%
2025 (est.)	185	▼	−3.1%
U.S. Decennial Census

As of the census of 2000, there were 262 people, 115 households, and 70 families residing in the village. The population density was 23.8 inhabitants per square mile (9.2/km^{2}). There were 158 housing units at an average density of 14.3 per square mile (5.5/km^{2}). The racial makeup of the village was 56.49% White, 43.13% African American, and 0.38% from two or more races.

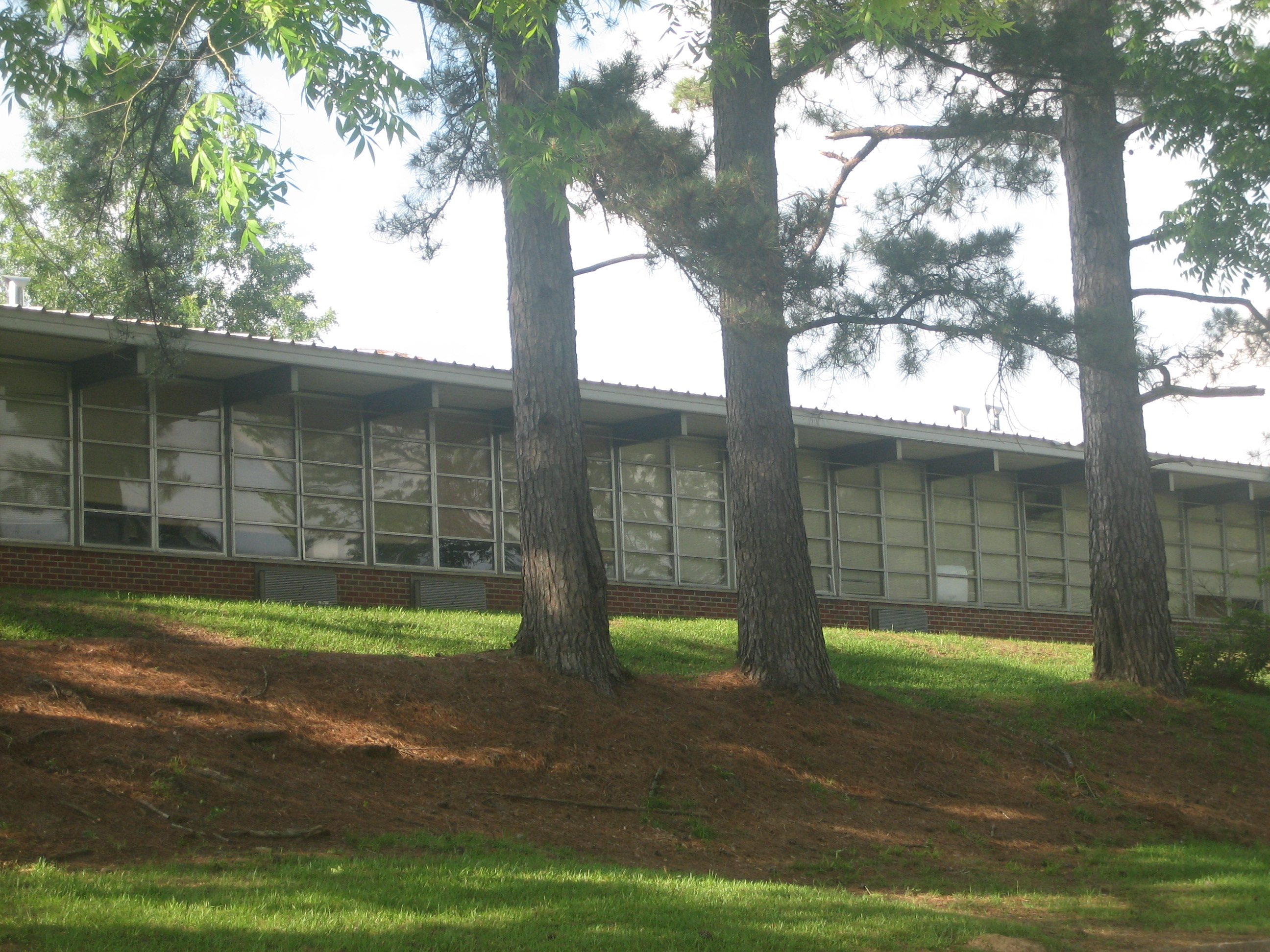
Bienville High School

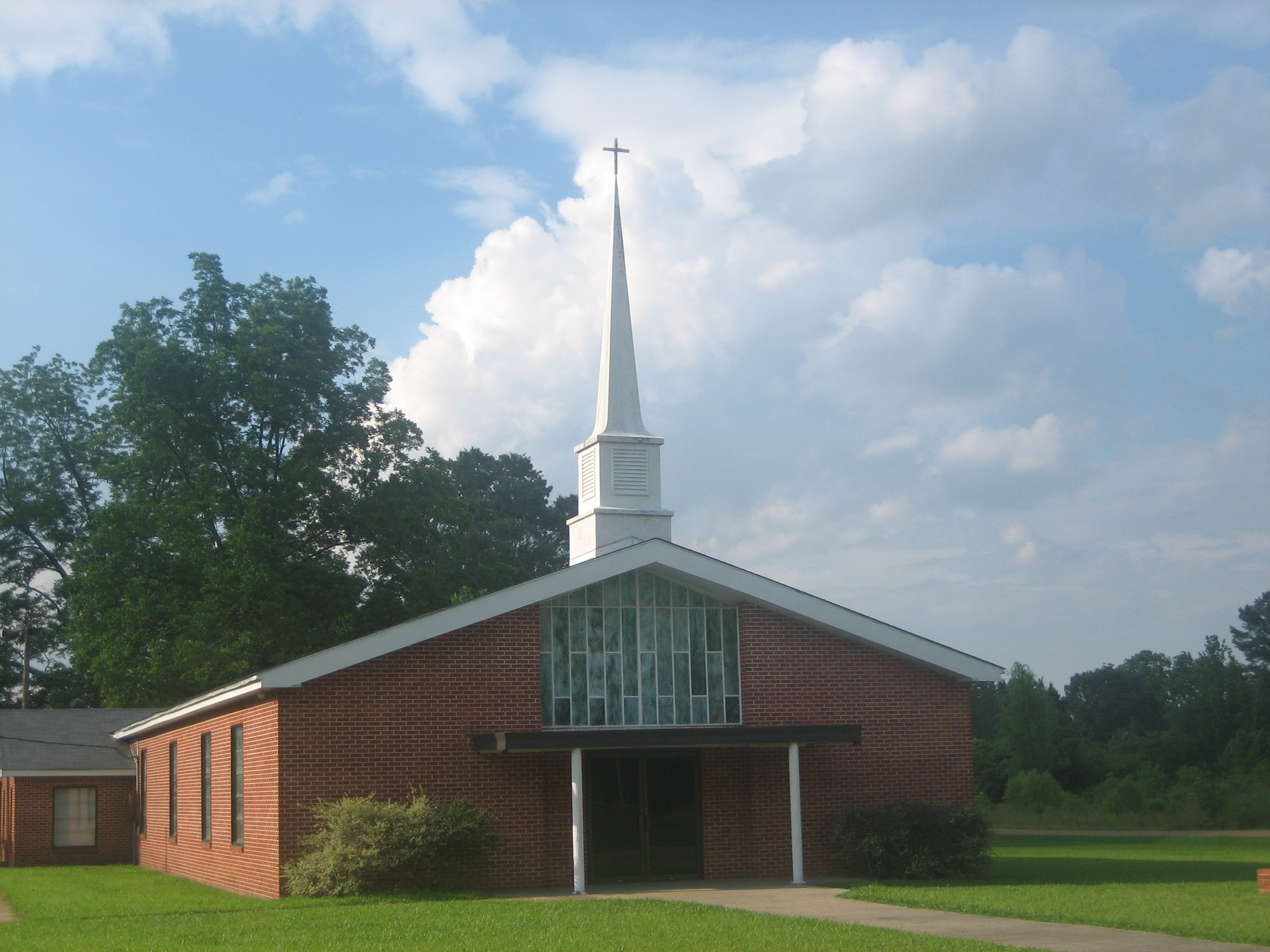
First Baptist Church of Bienville

There were 115 households, out of which 24.3% had children under the age of 18 living with them, 44.3% were married couples living together, 11.3% had a female householder with no husband present, and 38.3% were non-families. 38.3% of all households were made up of individuals, and 21.7% had someone living alone who was 65 years of age or older. The average household size was 2.28 and the average family size was 2.97.

In the village, the population was spread out, with 23.7% under the age of 18, 5.7% from 18 to 24, 22.5% from 25 to 44, 27.1% from 45 to 64, and 21.0% who were 65 years of age or older. The median age was 43 years. For every 100 females, there were 97.0 males. For every 100 females age 18 and over, there were 88.7 males.

The median income for a household in the village was $20,227, and the median income for a family was $20,909. Males had a median income of $30,417 versus $17,143 for females. The per capita income for the village was $12,656. About 23.2% of families and 22.7% of the population were below the poverty line, including 28.8% of those under the age of eighteen and 22.5% of those 65 or over.

== Notable people ==
- Rodney Alexander, Representative for Louisiana's 5th congressional district, was born in Bienville in 1946
- Charlie Hennigan, retired AFL player, was born in Bienville in 1935
- Garnie W. McGinty (1900–1984), historian at Louisiana Tech University in Ruston.
- Louise Peete (1880–1947), serial husband killer
