= Bienville Parish, Louisiana =

Parish in Louisiana, United States

Coordinates: 32.35°N 93.06°W

- Parish
- Parish of Bienville; Paroisse de Bienville (French)
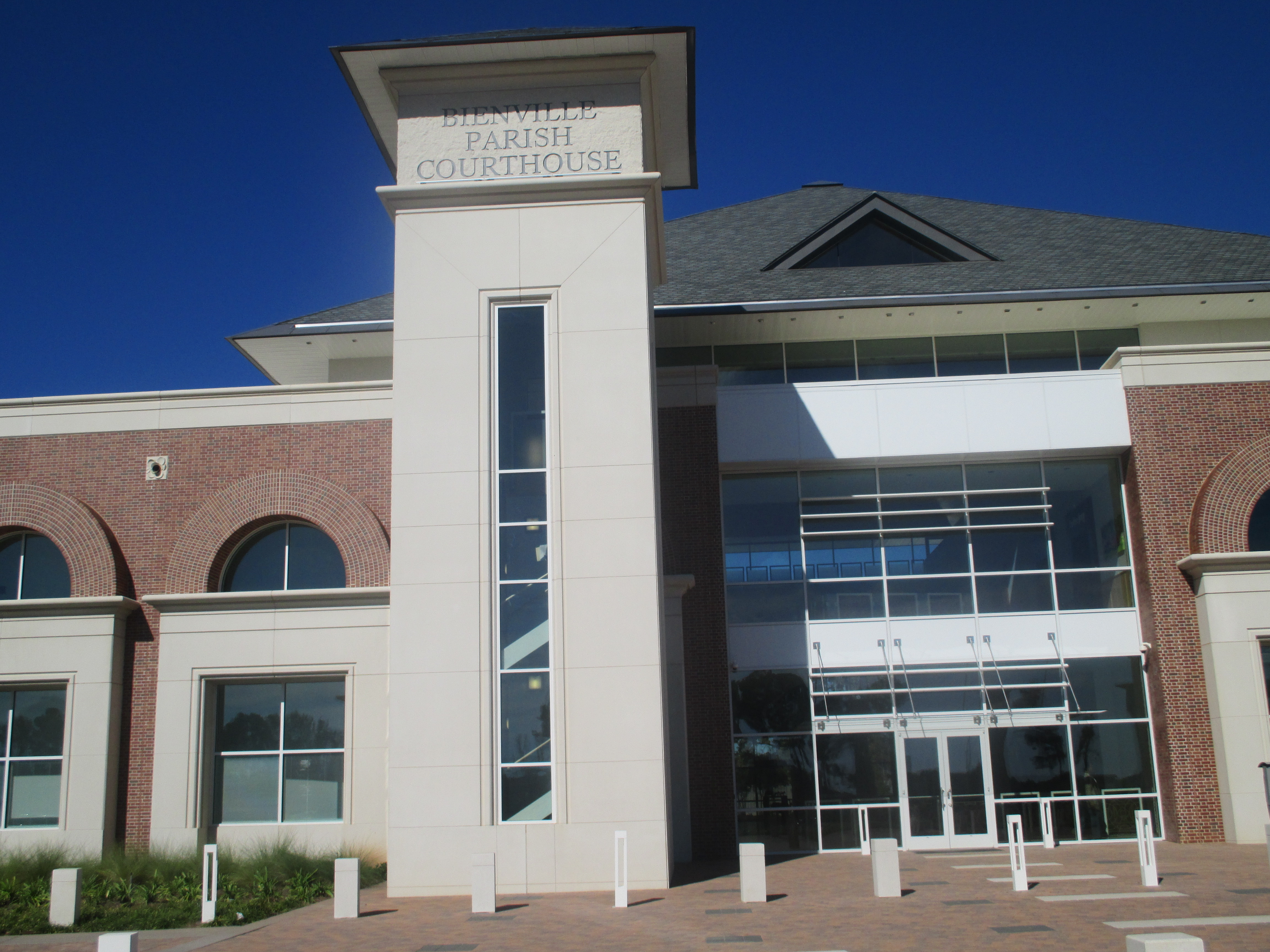
- The new Bienville Parish Courthouse building in Arcadia is located to the north of Interstate 20.

- Flag

- Location within the U.S. state of Louisiana

- Louisiana's location within the U.S.
- Country: United States
- State: Louisiana
- Region: North Louisiana
- Founded: March 14, 1848; 178 years ago
- Named for: Jean-Baptiste Le Moyne de Bienville
- Parish seat: Arcadia
- Largest municipality: Bienville (area); Arcadia (population)
- Incorporated municipalities: 10 (total): 4 towns and 6 villages; (located entirely or partially within parish boundaries)

Area
  - Total: 822 sq mi (2,130 km^{2})
  - Land: 811 sq mi (2,100 km^{2})
  - Water: 11 sq mi (28 km^{2})
  - percentage: 1.3 sq mi (3.4 km^{2})

Population (2020)
  - Total: 12,981
  - Estimate (2025): 12,269 ▼
  - Density: 16.0/sq mi (6.18/km^{2})
- Time zone: UTC-6 (CST)
  - Summer (DST): UTC-5 (CDT)
- Area code: 318
- Congressional district: 4th
- Website: Bienville Parish Government

Bienville Parish (French: Paroisse de Bienville, pronounced [paʁwas də bjɛ̃vil]) is a parish located in the northwestern portion of the U.S. state of Louisiana. At the 2020 census, the population was 12,981. The parish seat and most populous municipality is Arcadia.

The highest natural point in Louisiana, a hill known as Mt. Driskill, 535 feet (163 m) in elevation, is located in north central Bienville Parish. The mountain is located on private land with public access by walking trail. It is named for James Christopher Driskill, a 19th-century landowner. Nearby is Jordan Mountain, with an elevation of 493 feet (150 m).

== History ==
In the 1830s, Ruben Drake moved his family from South Carolina to what he named Mount Lebanon, the first permanent settlement in the parish. As the Drakes were devout Baptists, they established a church and school, which evolved into Mount Lebanon University, the forerunner of Louisiana Christian University in Pineville in Rapides Parish in Central Louisiana.

Bonnie and Clyde were shot dead in Bienville Parish on May 23, 1934.

== Geography ==
According to the U.S. Census Bureau, the parish has a total area of 822 square miles (2,130 km^{2}), of which 811 square miles (2,100 km^{2}) is land and 11 square miles (28 km^{2}) (1.3%) is water. The highest natural point in Louisiana, Driskill Mountain (535 ft), is located in Bienville Parish. Driskill Mountain is 11 miles (18 km) south of Arcadia at Latitude 32 degree, 25 minutes North; Longitude 92 degree 54 minutes West.

=== Interstates ===
- Interstate 20
- U.S. Highway 80
- U.S. Highway 371
- Louisiana Highway 4
- Louisiana Highway 9
- Louisiana Highway 147
- Louisiana Highway 151
- Louisiana Highway 153
- Louisiana Highway 154
- Louisiana Highway 155
- Louisiana Highway 501
- Louisiana Highway 507
- Louisiana Highway 508
- Louisiana Highway 516
- Louisiana Highway 517
- Louisiana Highway 519
- Louisiana Highway 783
- Louisiana Highway 790
- Louisiana Highway 792
- Louisiana Highway 793
- Louisiana Highway 794
- Louisiana Highway 795
- Louisiana Highway 796
- Louisiana Highway 797
- Louisiana Highway 798-2
- Louisiana Highway 798-3
- Louisiana Highway 799
- Louisiana Highway 815

=== Adjacent parishes ===
- Claiborne Parish (north)
- Lincoln Parish (northeast)
- Jackson Parish (east)
- Winn Parish (southeast)
- Natchitoches Parish (south)
- Red River Parish (southwest)
- Bossier Parish (west)
- Webster Parish (northwest)

== Communities ==
=== Towns ===
- Arcadia (parish seat and largest municipality)
- Gibsland
- Mount Lebanon
- Ringgold

=== Villages ===
- Bienville
- Bryceland
- Castor
- Jamestown
- Lucky
- Saline

=== Unincorporated communities ===
- Brown
- Fryeburg
- Roy
- Sparta
- Taylor

== Demographics ==
Historical population
Census	Pop.	Note	%±
1850	5,539		—
1860	11,000		98.6%
1870	10,636		−3.3%
1880	10,442		−1.8%
1890	14,108		35.1%
1900	17,588		24.7%
1910	21,776		23.8%
1920	20,977		−3.7%
1930	23,789		13.4%
1940	23,933		0.6%
1950	19,105		−20.2%
1960	16,726		−12.5%
1970	16,024		−4.2%
1980	16,387		2.3%
1990	15,979		−2.5%
2000	15,752		−1.4%
2010	14,353		−8.9%
2020	12,981		−9.6%
2025 (est.)	12,269	▼	−5.5%
U.S. Decennial Census; 1790-1960 1900-1990; 1990-2000

=== 2020 census ===
As of the 2020 census, there were 12,981 people in the parish, the median age was 43.9 years, 22.4% of residents were under the age of 18, 21.3% of residents were 65 years of age or older, and for every 100 females there were 91.3 males and for every 100 females age 18 and over there were 89.2 males age 18 and over.

The racial makeup of the parish was 53.5% White, 40.9% Black or African American, 0.5% American Indian and Alaska Native, 0.2% Asian, <0.1% Native Hawaiian and Pacific Islander, 0.5% from some other race, and 4.4% from two or more races. Hispanic or Latino residents of any race comprised 1.6% of the population.

<0.1% of residents lived in urban areas, while 100.0% lived in rural areas.

There were 5,459 households in the parish, of which 28.9% had children under the age of 18 living in them. Of all households, 38.6% were married-couple households, 20.9% were households with a male householder and no spouse or partner present, and 35.6% were households with a female householder and no spouse or partner present. About 33.2% of all households were made up of individuals and 16.0% had someone living alone who was 65 years of age or older.

There were 6,816 housing units, of which 19.9% were vacant. Among occupied housing units, 72.7% were owner-occupied and 27.3% were renter-occupied. The homeowner vacancy rate was 0.8% and the rental vacancy rate was 8.3%.

=== Racial and ethnic composition ===
Bienville Parish, Louisiana – Racial and ethnic composition Note: the US Census treats Hispanic/Latino as an ethnic category. This table excludes Latinos from the racial categories and assigns them to a separate category. Hispanics/Latinos may be of any race.
Race / Ethnicity (NH = Non-Hispanic)	Pop 1980	Pop 1990	Pop 2000	Pop 2010	Pop 2020	% 1980	% 1990	% 2000	% 2010	% 2020
White alone (NH)	9,321	8,935	8,607	7,850	6,901	56.88%	55.92%	54.64%	54.69%	53.16%
Black or African American alone (NH)	6,836	6,929	6,860	6,048	5,273	41.72%	43.36%	43.55%	42.14%	40.62%
Native American or Alaska Native alone (NH)	21	21	39	48	61	0.13%	0.13%	0.25%	0.33%	0.47%
Asian alone (NH)	25	12	24	34	21	0.15%	0.08%	0.15%	0.24%	0.16%
Native Hawaiian or Pacific Islander alone (NH)	x	x	0	0	5	x	x	0.00%	0.00%	0.04%
Other race alone (NH)	8	1	2	1	10	0.05%	0.01%	0.01%	0.01%	0.08%
Mixed race or Multiracial (NH)	x	x	71	165	499	x	x	0.45%	1.15%	3.84%
Hispanic or Latino (any race)	176	81	149	207	211	1.07%	0.51%	0.95%	1.44%	1.63%
Total	16,387	15,979	15,752	14,353	12,981	100.00%	100.00%	100.00%	100.00%	100.00%

=== 2000 census ===
At the 2000 census, there were 15,752 people, 6,108 households, and 4,214 families residing in the parish. The population density was 19 people per square mile (7.3 people/km^{2}). There were 7,830 housing units at an average density of 10 per square mile (3.9/km^{2}).

In 2000, the racial makeup of the parish was 54.92% White, 43.78% Black or African American, 0.27% Native American, 0.15% Asian, 0.32% from other races, and 0.55% from two or more races. 0.95% of the population were Hispanic or Latino of any race.

At the 2000 census, there were 6,108 households, out of which 31.00% had children under the age of 18 living with them, 46.70% were married couples living together, 17.70% had a female householder with no husband present, and 31.00% were non-families. 28.80% of all households were made up of individuals, and 14.10% had someone living alone who was 65 years of age or older. The average household size was 2.52 and the average family size was 3.09.

A tabulated 27.30% of the population were under the age of 18, 8.00% were 18 to 24, 24.60% were 25 to 44, 22.50% were 45 to 64, and 17.60% were 65 years of age or older. The median age was 38 years. For every 100 females there were 91.20 males. For every 100 females age 18 and over, there were 85.80 males. The median income for a household in the parish was $23,663, and the median income for a family was $30,241. Males had a median income of $28,022 versus $18,682 for females. The per capita income for the parish was $12,471. About 21.80% of families and 26.10% of the population were below the poverty line, including 34.00% of those under age 18 and 23.20% of those age 65 or over.

== Politics ==
United States presidential election results for Bienville Parish, Louisiana
Year	Republican		Democratic		Third party(ies)	
Year	No.	%	No.	%	No.	%
1912	8	0.80%	822	81.79%	175	17.41%
1916	20	1.59%	1,229	98.01%	5	0.40%
1920	257	15.08%	1,419	83.27%	28	1.64%
1924	67	7.94%	774	91.71%	3	0.36%
1928	367	22.00%	1,301	78.00%	0	0.00%
1932	41	1.51%	2,671	98.45%	1	0.04%
1936	213	7.59%	2,593	92.38%	1	0.04%
1940	362	11.15%	2,883	88.82%	1	0.03%
1944	705	28.13%	1,801	71.87%	0	0.00%
1948	191	6.42%	421	14.14%	2,365	79.44%
1952	1,986	53.10%	1,754	46.90%	0	0.00%
1956	1,515	48.87%	815	26.29%	770	24.84%
1960	1,230	34.67%	625	17.62%	1,693	47.72%
1964	3,740	81.39%	855	18.61%	0	0.00%
1968	941	15.24%	1,768	28.63%	3,466	56.13%
1972	3,384	58.99%	1,890	32.94%	463	8.07%
1976	2,499	41.57%	3,402	56.60%	110	1.83%
1980	3,508	45.15%	4,123	53.06%	139	1.79%
1984	4,587	55.76%	3,530	42.91%	109	1.33%
1988	3,680	48.83%	3,705	49.16%	152	2.02%
1992	2,412	32.45%	3,899	52.46%	1,121	15.08%
1996	2,402	32.53%	4,335	58.71%	647	8.76%
2000	3,269	46.66%	3,413	48.72%	324	4.62%
2004	3,612	50.47%	3,399	47.49%	146	2.04%
2008	3,776	50.82%	3,589	48.30%	65	0.87%
2012	3,641	50.55%	3,490	48.45%	72	1.00%
2016	3,756	53.62%	3,129	44.67%	120	1.71%
2020	3,891	55.19%	3,067	43.50%	92	1.30%
2024	3,660	58.50%	2,531	40.46%	65	1.04%

== Education ==
The Bienville Parish School Board operates area public schools. In 2023, the school district was identified as one of the most segregated in Louisiana by the Segregation Tracking Project. The district’s segregation doubled since 1991, becoming as segregated as or more than any district monitored since 2000. In 2023, there were 52% more white students in the average plurality-white school than the average plurality-black school.

== Notable people ==
- Henry Newton Brown Jr., judge of the Louisiana Second Circuit Court of Appeals (1992–2012) and district attorney of Bossier and Webster parishes (1976–1991), was born in Bienville Parish in 1941.
- Dee Brown, author of Bury My Heart at Wounded Knee, born in Alberta.
- Bill DeMott, a professional wrestler, maintains a house in Bienville Parish.
- Caroline Dormon (1888–1971), a Louisiana botanist and preservationist, grew up in Bienville Parish.
- Jamie Fair, member of the Louisiana House of Representatives from 1980 to 1984
- Charlie Hennigan, American Football League player from the 1960s
- Henderson Jordan (1896–1958), sheriff of Bienville Parish, 1932–1940; participated in the ambush and killing of Bonnie and Clyde on May 23, 1934; interred at Arcadia Cemetery
- Billy McCormack (1928–2012), Baptist pastor from Shreveport, director and vice president of the Christian Coalition of America, was born in Bienville Parish and is interred at Ringgold.
- Garnie W. McGinty (1900–1984), Louisiana historian
- Danny Roy Moore (1925–c. 2020), represented Claiborne and Bienville parishes in the Louisiana Senate from 1964 to 1968; resided in Arcadia
- Prentiss Oakley (1905–1957), one of six law-enforcement officials involved in the ambush and killing of Bonnie and Clyde; sheriff, 1940–1952
- W. C. Robinson, mathematics professor and second president of Louisiana Tech for the 1899 to 1900 academic year; Robinson Hall on campus is named in his honor; from the Mount Lebanon community.
- Lee Smith, pitcher
- Sam Smith (1922–1995), Member of the Washington House of Representatives was born in Gibsland.
- Jesse N. Stone, president of the Southern University System from 1974 to 1985; civil rights activist
- Marshall H. Twitchell, Reconstruction era state senator who helped to establish Coushatta, the seat of neighboring Red River Parish
- Rush Wimberly, former member of both houses of the Louisiana legislature, lawyer in Arcadia and Shreveport

== See also ==
- National Register of Historic Places listings in Bienville Parish, Louisiana
