= Wemple, Louisiana =

- Unincorporated community
- Location within Louisiana Location within the United States
- Coordinates: 32°00′45″N 93°28′47″W
- Country: United States
- State: Louisiana
- Parish: DeSoto
- Elevation: 171 ft (52 m)
- Time zone: UTC-6 (Central (CST))
  - Summer (DST): UTC-5 (CDT)
- Area code: 318
- GNIS feature ID: 541212

Wemple is an unincorporated community in DeSoto Parish, Louisiana, United States. The community is on Louisiana Highway 510 8 miles (13 km) west of Coushatta.
