= Jamie Fair =

American politician

James Hartwell "Jamie" Fair, Jr.

Member of the Louisiana House of Representatives from District 13 (Bienville, Jackson, and Ouachita parishes)
- In office 1980–1984
- Preceded by: E.L. "Bubba" Henry
- Succeeded by: Jimmy L. Long

Personal details
- Born: December 18, 1945 (age 80) Bienville Parish, Louisiana, USA
- Party: Democratic/later Republican
- Spouse: Divorced from Linda Bacon Fair
- Children: James H. "Jay" Fair, III Jennifer Fair Carpenter Jonathan Neil Fair
- Occupation: Businessman

James Hartwell Fair, Jr. (born December 18, 1945) is a former member of the Louisiana House of Representatives from Bienville Parish in north Louisiana. He served as a Democrat in the state House for a single term from 1980 to 1984 during the administration of Governor David C. Treen.

Fair was elected in 1979 to fill the seat vacated by Speaker E.L. "Bubba" Henry of Jonesboro, who ran unsuccessfully that year for governor of Louisiana. Fair was unseated after a single term in the 1983 election by Jimmy L. Long.

Preceded by Edgerton L. "Bubba" Henry	Louisiana State Representative from District 13 (Jackson, Bienville and part of Ouachita parishes); 1980–1984	Succeeded by Jimmy L. Long
