= List of state highways in Louisiana (150–199) =

The following is a list of state highways in the U.S. state of Louisiana designated in the 150-199 range.

== Louisiana Highway 150 ==
Louisiana Highway 150
- Location: Simsboro–Ruston
- Length: 8.83 mi (14.21 km)
- Existed: 1955–present

Louisiana Highway 150 (LA 150) runs 8.83 miles (14.21 km) in an east–west direction from a junction with US 80 and LA 563 in Simsboro to a junction with the concurrent US 80, US 167, and LA 146 in Ruston, Lincoln Parish.

The entire highway is in Lincoln Parish.

Location	mi	km	Destinations	Notes
Simsboro	0.0	0.0	US 80 – Monroe, Ruston LA 563 south	Western terminus; western end of LA 563 concurrency
Simsboro	0.5	0.80	LA 563 north – Dubach	Eastern end of LA 563 concurrency
Grambling	3.7	6.0	LA 149	
Grambling	6.4	10.3	LA 818 south	Northern terminus of LA 818
Ruston	8.0	12.9	LA 544 (Tech Drive)	
Ruston	8.8	14.2	US 80 / US 167 / LA 146 (North Trenton Street, North Vienna Street)	Eastern terminus
1.000 mi = 1.609 km; 1.000 km = 0.621 mi: Concurrency terminus

== Louisiana Highway 151 ==
Louisiana Highway 151
- Location: Arcadia–Cadeville
- Length: 56.15 mi (90.36 km)
- Existed: 1955–present

Louisiana Highway 151 (LA 151) runs 56.15 miles (90.36 km) in a general east–west direction from a junction with US 80, US 80 Truck, and LA 9 in Arcadia, Bienville Parish around the north side of the Ruston area to LA 546 at Cadeville, Ouachita Parish.

Parish	Location	mi	km	Destinations	Notes
Bienville	Arcadia			US 80 / LA 9 (First Street) / US 80 Truck west to LA 147	West end of US 80 Truck concurrency
Bienville	Arcadia			US 80 Truck west / LA 798-1 west (Second Street) / Second Street	East end of US 80 Truck concurrency; east terminus of LA 798-1
Bienville	Arcadia			LA 798-2 west	East terminus of LA 798-2
Bienville	Arcadia			I-20 – Shreveport, Monroe	
Lincoln				LA 544 east – Ruston	Western terminus of LA 544
Lincoln				LA 545 north – Homer	Southern terminus of LA 545
Lincoln				LA 146 – Homer, Vienna	
Lincoln				LA 563 south	Northern terminus of LA 563
Lincoln				LA 152 west – Hico	Eastern terminus of LA 152
Lincoln	Dubach			US 63 north / US 167 north – Bernice	Western end of concurrency with US-63 and US-167
Lincoln	Dubach			US 63 south / US 167 south – Ruston	Eastern end of concurrency with US-63 and US-167
Lincoln				LA 545 south – Hico	Northern terminus of LA 545
Lincoln				LA 823 east	Eastern terminus of LA 823
Union	D'Arbonne			LA 33 – Farmerville, Ruston	
Lincoln	No major junctions				
Union	Downsville			LA 145 – Farmerville, Choudrant	
Ouachita	Pleasant Valley			LA 837 south – Eureka	Northern terminus of LA 837
Ouachita	Carlton			LA 837 north – Eureka	Southern terminus of LA 837
Ouachita	Calhoun			I-20 – Monroe, Shreveport	Interstate 20 exit 101
Ouachita	Calhoun			US 80	
Ouachita	Calhoun			LA 144 west	Eastern terminus of LA 144
Ouachita	Cadeville			LA 546 – West Monroe, Eros	
1.000 mi = 1.609 km; 1.000 km = 0.621 mi: Concurrency terminus

== Louisiana Highway 152 ==
Louisiana Highway 152
- Location: Lisbon–Dubach
- Length: 10.19 mi (16.40 km)
- Existed: 1955–present

Louisiana Highway 152 (LA 152) runs 10.19 miles (16.40 km) in a northwest to southeast direction from LA 2 east of Lisbon, Claiborne Parish to LA 151 west of Dubach, Lincoln Parish.

Parish	Location	mi	km	Destinations	Notes
Claiborne				LA 2 – Bernice, Homer	Western terminus
Lincoln	Hico			LA 545	
Lincoln				LA 151 – Arcadia, Simsboro	Eastern terminus
1.000 mi = 1.609 km; 1.000 km = 0.621 mi

== Louisiana Highway 153 ==
Louisiana Highway 153
- Location: Creston–Castor
- Length: 22.57 mi (36.32 km)
- Existed: 1955–present

Louisiana Highway 153 (LA 153) runs 22.57 miles (36.32 km) in a north–south direction from a junction with LA 9 and LA 156 in Creston, Natchitoches Parish to a junction with LA 4 and LA 507 in Castor, Bienville Parish.

Parish	Location	mi	km	Destinations	Notes
Natchitoches	Creston			LA 9 / LA 156 east – Chestnut, Campti	Southern terminus; western terminus of LA 156
Natchitoches	Ashland			LA 155 west – Coushatta	Southern end of LA 155 concurrency
Natchitoches	Ashland			LA 155 east – Saline	Northern end of LA 155 concurrency
Bienville	Castor			LA 4 / LA 597 / LA 792 north – Ringgold, Womack, Lucky	Northern terminus; southern terminus of LA 792
1.000 mi = 1.609 km; 1.000 km = 0.621 mi

== Louisiana Highway 154 ==
Louisiana Highway 154
- Location: Elm Grove–Athens
- Length: 53.09 mi (85.44 km)
- Existed: 1955–present

Louisiana Highway 154 (LA 154) runs 53.09 miles (85.44 km) in a southwest to northeast direction from US 71 at Elm Grove, Bossier Parish to a junction with LA 9 and LA 518 in Athens, Claiborne Parish.

Parish	Location	mi	km	Destinations	Notes
Bossier	Elm Grove			US 71 – Coushatta, Bossier City	Western terminus
Bossier				LA 157 south	Western end of LA 157 concurrency
Bossier				LA 157 north – Haughton	Eastern end of LA 157 concurrency
Bienville	Ringgold			LA 4 west – Loggy Bayou	West end of LA 4 concurrency
Bienville	Ringgold			US 371 north – Minden	West end of US 371 concurrency
Bienville	Ringgold			US 371 south – Coushatta	East end of US 371 concurrency
Bienville	Ringgold			LA 4 east – Castor	East end of LA 4 concurrency
Bienville	Jamestown			LA 792 – Heflin, Castor	
Bienville				LA 507 – Bienville, Castor	LA 154 makes a left turn here
Bienville				LA 516 west – Fryeburg	West end of LA 516 concurrency
Bienville	Sailes			LA 516 east – Bryceland	East end of LA 516 concurrency
Bienville				LA 793 west	Eastern terminus of LA 793
Bienville	Mount Lebanon			LA 517 south – Bryceland	Northern terminus of LA 517
Bienville				LA 795 south	Northern terminus of LA 795
Bienville	Gibsland			LA 794 south	Northern terminus of LA 794
Bienville	Gibsland			US 80 east / US 80 Truck west / LA 799 west	Southern end of US 80 concurrency; eastern terminus of US 80 Truck and LA 799
Bienville	Gibsland			US 80 west	Northern end of US 80 concurrency
Bienville	Gibsland			I-20 – Monroe, Shreveport	Interstate 20 exit 61
Claiborne	Athens			LA 518 west	Western end of concurrency with LA 518
Claiborne	Athens			LA 9 / LA 518 east – Homer, Arcadia	Eastern end of concurrency with LA 518; Eastern terminus
1.000 mi = 1.609 km; 1.000 km = 0.621 mi: Concurrency terminus

== Louisiana Highway 155 ==
Louisiana Highway 155
- Location: Coushatta–Quitman
- Length: 60.60 mi (97.53 km)
- Existed: 1955–present

Louisiana Highway 155 (LA 155) runs 60.60 miles (97.53 km) in an east–west direction from a junction with US 71 and US 371 in Coushatta, Red River Parish to LA 146 east of Quitman, Jackson Parish.

== Louisiana Highway 156 ==
Louisiana Highway 156
- Location: Creston–Winnfield
- Length: 26.92 mi (43.32 km)
- Existed: 1955–present

Louisiana Highway 156 (LA 156) runs 26.92 miles (43.32 km) in an east–west direction from a junction with LA 9 and LA 153 in Creston, Natchitoches Parish to US 167 north of Winnfield, Winn Parish.

== Louisiana Highway 157 ==
Louisiana Highway 157
- Location: McDade–Shongaloo
- Length: 79.37 mi (127.73 km)
- Existed: 1955–present

Louisiana Highway 157 (LA 157) runs 79.37 miles (127.73 km) in a general north–south direction from US 71 at McDade, Bossier Parish to a junction with LA 159 and LA 615 north of Shongaloo, Webster Parish.

== Louisiana Highway 158 ==
Louisiana Highway 158
- Location: Colfax
- Length: 6.34 mi (10.20 km)
- Existed: 1955–present

Louisiana Highway 158 (LA 158) runs 6.34 miles (10.20 km) from LA 8 in Colfax to a local road north of Colfax.

== Louisiana Highway 159 ==
Louisiana Highway 159
- Location: Minden–Shongaloo
- Length: 31.76 mi (51.11 km)
- Existed: 1955–present

Louisiana Highway 159 (LA 159) runs 31.76 miles (51.11 km) in a north–south direction from a junction with I-20 and US 371 in Minden to the Arkansas state line north of Shongaloo, Webster Parish.

== Louisiana Highway 160 ==
Louisiana Highway 160
- Location: Hughes–Leton
- Length: 34.24 mi (55.10 km)
- Existed: 1955–present

Louisiana Highway 160 (LA 160) runs 34.24 miles (55.10 km) in an east–west direction from a local road north of Benton, Bossier Parish to a junction with LA 2 and LA 159 at Leton, Webster Parish.

== Louisiana Highway 161 ==
Louisiana Highway 161
- Location: Claiborne Parish
- Length: 4.30 mi (6.92 km)
- Existed: 1955–present

Louisiana Highway 161 (LA 161) runs 4.30 miles (6.92 km) from LA 2 Alt. in Gordon to AR 15 at Arkansas state line northeast of Gordon.

== Louisiana Highway 162 ==
Louisiana Highway 162
- Location: Benton–Midway
- Length: 9.01 mi (14.50 km)
- Existed: 1955–present

Louisiana Highway 162 (LA 162) runs 9.01 miles (14.50 km) in an east–west direction from LA 3 in Benton to LA 157 at Midway, Bossier Parish.

The route heads east-southeast on Fifth Street from an intersection with LA 3 (Benton Road) in Benton. It loses its name as it crosses out of Benton, curving to the east-northeast at Silver Leaf Drive. It makes twists and turns through northern Bossier Parish before reaching its eastern terminus at a T-intersection with LA 157 at a point known as Midway. LA 162 is an undivided two-lane highway for its entire length.

The entire highway is in Bossier Parish.

Location	mi	km	Destinations	Notes
Benton	0.0	0.0	LA 3 (Benton Road) – Bossier City, Plain Dealing	Western terminus
Midway	9.0	14.5	LA 157 – Bellevue, Ivan	Eastern terminus
1.000 mi = 1.609 km; 1.000 km = 0.621 mi

== Louisiana Highway 163 ==
Louisiana Highway 163
- Location: Lake Bistineau–Doyline
- Length: 9.14 mi (14.71 km)
- Existed: 1955–present

Louisiana Highway 163 (LA 163) runs 9.14 miles (14.71 km) in a north–south direction from a local road south of Lake Bistineau State Park to LA 164 in Doyline, Webster Parish.

The route begins at an intersection with Gorton Road, south of Lake Bistineau State Park. It heads west for 1.1 miles (1.8 km) before turning to the north at an intersection with LA 527. It makes twists and turns through southwestern Webster Parish before entering the village of Doyline. LA 163 continues through Doyline for 1.8 miles (2.9 km) before reaching its northern terminus at an intersection with LA 164. LA 163 is an undivided two-lane highway for its entire length.

The entire highway is in Webster Parish.

Location	mi	km	Destinations	Notes
	0.0	0.0	Begin state maintenance at intersection with Gorton Road	Southern terminus
	1.1	1.8	LA 527 west – Taylortown, Koran	Eastern terminus of LA 527
Doyline	9.1	14.6	LA 164 – Haughton, Sibley	Northern terminus
1.000 mi = 1.609 km; 1.000 km = 0.621 mi

== Louisiana Highway 164 ==
Louisiana Highway 164
- Location: Haughton–Sibley
- Length: 12.78 mi (20.57 km)
- Existed: 1955–present

Louisiana Highway 164 (LA 164) runs 12.78 miles (20.57 km) in an east–west direction from the concurrent US 79 and US 80 north of Haughton, Bossier Parish to US 371 in Sibley, Webster Parish.

The route heads south-southeast from an intersection with US 79/US 80 in the eastern portion of Bossier Parish. It intersects LA 3227 and continues south-southeast for 1.0 mile (1.6 km) before curving to the east at an intersection with LA 614. It begins to parallel the Kansas City Southern railroad tracks and after 1.4 miles (2.3 km), it enters Webster Parish. It intersects LA 163 in the village of Doyline. The route ends 6.7 miles (10.8 km) later at an intersection with US 371 in Sibley. LA 164 is an undivided two-lane highway for its entire length.

Parish	Location	mi	km	Destinations	Notes
Bossier		0.0	0.0	US 79 / US 80 – Shreveport, Minden	Western terminus
Bossier		1.6	2.6	LA 3227 west – Haughton	Eastern terminus of LA 3227
Bossier		2.5	4.0	LA 614 west	Eastern terminus of LA 614
Webster		6.0	9.7	LA 163 south – Doyline	Northern terminus of LA 163
Webster	Sibley	12.8	20.6	US 371 – Minden, Ringgold	Eastern terminus
1.000 mi = 1.609 km; 1.000 km = 0.621 mi

== Louisiana Highway 166 ==
Louisiana Highway 166
- Location: Southwest of Doyline - near Lake Bistineau
- Existed: 1955–1960

Louisiana Highway 166 (LA 166) ran from the Bossier-Webster parish line southwest of Doyline to a point near Lake Bistineau. It is now Parish Line Road.

== Louisiana Highway 168 ==
Louisiana Highway 168
- Location: Rodessa–Ida
- Length: 7.25 mi (11.67 km)
- Existed: 1955–present

Louisiana Highway 168 (LA 168) runs 7.25 miles (11.67 km) in an east–west direction from LA 1 in Rodessa to US 71 in Ida, Caddo Parish.

The route heads northeast from LA 1 in the village of Rodessa, immediately crossing the Kansas City Southern railroad tracks before turning east at Pitts Road. It makes several twists and turns through northern Caddo Parish before having an interchange with I-49 at Exit 245. It curves to the north and then to the east-southeast, before terminating at US 71 in the village of Ida. LA 168 is an undivided two-lane highway, except for its interchange with I-49 where it briefly becomes a divided four-lane highway.

The entire highway is in Caddo Parish.

Location	mi	km	Destinations	Notes
Rodessa	0.0	0.0	LA 1 (West Front Street)	Western terminus
	5.8– 6.1	9.3– 9.8	I-49 – Texarkana, Shreveport	Exit 245 on I-49
Ida	7.2	11.6	US 71	Eastern terminus
1.000 mi = 1.609 km; 1.000 km = 0.621 mi

== Louisiana Highway 169 ==
Louisiana Highway 169
- Location: Keachi–Belcher
- Length: 45.92 mi (73.90 km)
- Existed: 1955–present

Louisiana Highway 169 (LA 169) runs 45.92 miles (73.90 km) in a north–south direction from LA 172 west of Keachi, DeSoto Parish to US 71 south of Belcher, Caddo Parish.

The route begins at an intersection with LA 172 in northwestern DeSoto Parish, crossing into Caddo Parish 2.1 miles (3.4 km) later. From here, it makes twists and turns through southwestern Caddo Parish, intersecting LA 789 and LA 525 south of and at Spring Ridge, respectively. 7.9 miles (12.7 km) north of Spring Ridge, it enters the town of Greenwood. It then begins a 0.5 miles (0.80 km) concurrency with US 79/US 80 through Greenwood before splitting off to the north just south of an interchange with I-20 at Exit 3. After this interchange, LA 169 then begins a generally northward course for 16.4 miles (26.4 km) before entering the town of Mooringsport. It gains the local name of Greenwood Street, turning east onto Jennings Street at an intersection with LA 767. It intersects LA 538, immediately crossing the Kansas City Southern railroad tracks before continuing east out of Mooringsport. At an intersection with LA 1, LA 169 dips to the south before curving back to the east. On both sides of LA 1, there are old remnants of LA 169 that are now local roads. 4.5 miles (7.2 km) after this intersection, LA 169 has an interchange with the newly constructed section of I-49 at Exit 223. LA 169 continues east for a final 0.8 miles (1.3 km) before terminating at US 71 northwest of Dixie. LA 169 is an undivided two-lane highway, except for its interchange with I-49 where it briefly becomes a divided four-lane highway.

Parish	Location	mi	km	Destinations	Notes
DeSoto		0.0	0.0	LA 172	Southern terminus
Caddo		10.0	16.1	LA 789 south	Northern terminus of LA 789
Caddo	Spring Ridge	11.0	17.7	LA 525 north (Colquitt Road)	Southern terminus of LA 525
Caddo	Greenwood	21.0	33.8	US 79 north / US 80 east (Greenwood Road)	Southern end of US 79/US 80 concurrency
Caddo	Greenwood	21.5	34.6	US 79 south – Carthage US 80 west	Northern end of US 79/US 80 concurrency
Caddo	Greenwood	21.6– 21.9	34.8– 35.2	I-20 – Dallas, Shreveport	Exit 3 on I-20
Caddo	Mooringsport	39.2	63.1	LA 767 north (Greenwood Street)	Southern terminus of LA 767
Caddo	Mooringsport	39.4	63.4	LA 538 north (Old Mooringsport Road)	Southern end of LA 538 concurrency
Caddo	Mooringsport	39.5	63.6	LA 538 south (Old Mooringsport Road)	Northern end of LA 538 concurrency
Caddo		41.0	66.0	LA 1	
Caddo		45.5– 45.7	73.2– 73.5	I-49 – Texarkana, Shreveport	Exit 223 on I-49
Caddo		46.5	74.8	US 71	Northern terminus
1.000 mi = 1.609 km; 1.000 km = 0.621 mi: Concurrency terminus

== Louisiana Highway 170 ==
Louisiana Highway 170
- Location: Vivian–Gilliam
- Length: 14.23 mi (22.90 km)
- Existed: 1955–present

Louisiana Highway 170 (LA 170) runs 14.23 miles (22.90 km) in an east–west direction from the Texas state line west of Vivian to a junction with US 71 and LA 3049 in Gilliam, Caddo Parish.

The route heads east from the Texas state line until curving to the southeast upon entering Vivian, becoming Tennessee Avenue. 0.4 miles (0.64 km) later, it becomes concurrent with LA 1 (Pine Street), heading south through Vivian before becoming concurrent with LA 2 at Camp Road. 0.2 miles (0.32 km) later, LA 2 and LA 170 split; LA 2 heads northeast toward Hosston, while LA 170 continues southeast, becoming Pardue Street. After 7.3 miles (11.7 km), it interchanges with I-49 at Exit 231. After this, it curves to the north and then to the northeast, before ending at US 71 and LA 3049 in the village of Gilliam. LA 170 is an undivided two-lane highway, except for its interchange with I-49 where it briefly becomes a divided four-lane highway.

The entire highway is in Caddo Parish.

Location	mi	km	Destinations	Notes
	0.0	0.0	Cass County Road	Western terminus
Vivian	3.4	5.5	LA 1 north (North Pine Street)	Western end of LA 1 concurrency
Vivian	4.4	7.1	LA 1 south / LA 2 west (South Pine Street)	Eastern end of LA 1 concurrency; western end of LA 2 concurrency
Vivian	4.6	7.4	LA 2 east (South Pardue Street)	Eastern end of LA 2 concurrency
	11.9– 12.0	19.2– 19.3	I-49 – Texarkana, Shreveport	Exit 231 on I-49
Gilliam	14.2	22.9	US 71 LA 3049 south (First Street)	Eastern terminus of LA 170; northern terminus of LA 3049
1.000 mi = 1.609 km; 1.000 km = 0.621 mi: Concurrency terminus

== Louisiana Highway 172 ==
Louisiana Highway 172
- Location: Keachi
- Length: 8.48 mi (13.65 km)
- Existed: 1955–present

Louisiana Highway 172 (LA 172) runs 8.48 miles (13.65 km) in an east–west direction from the Texas state line west of Keachi to a junction with LA 5 and LA 789 in Keachi, DeSoto Parish.

== Louisiana Highway 173 ==
Louisiana Highway 173
- Location: Shreveport–Dixie
- Length: 19.29 mi (31.04 km)
- Existed: 1955–present

Louisiana Highway 173 (LA 173) runs 19.29 miles (31.04 km) in a general north–south direction from LA 1 in Shreveport to LA 3049 at Dixie, Caddo Parish.

== Louisiana Highway 174 ==
Louisiana Highway 174
- Location: Converse–Lake End
- Length: 31.79 mi (51.16 km)
- Existed: 1955–present

Louisiana Highway 174 (LA 174) runs 31.79 miles (51.16 km) in an east–west direction from LA 191 west of Converse, Sabine Parish to LA 1 at Lake End, Red River Parish.

The route heads east from LA 191, which runs along the Toledo Bend Reservoir, and intersects US 171 in Converse. LA 174 proceeds east through Oak Grove and Mitchell and runs concurrent with the otherwise north–south LA 483 between those points. In Pleasant Hill, LA 174 intersects LA 175 then continues northeast and crosses from Sabine Parish into DeSoto Parish.

The highway passes through the southeast corner of DeSoto Parish briefly before entering Natchitoches Parish. Here, LA 174 intersects LA 487 at Ajax and passes through an interchange with I-49, connecting to Shreveport and Alexandria. LA 174 crosses Bayou Pierre into Red River Parish and ends shortly thereafter at an intersection with LA 1 at Lake End, a point on the Red River southeast of Coushatta.

== Louisiana Highway 175 ==
Louisiana Highway 175
- Location: Many–Shreveport
- Length: 63.93 mi (102.89 km)
- Existed: 1955–present

Louisiana Highway 175 (LA 175) runs 63.93 miles (102.89 km) in a north–south direction from US 171 northwest of Many, Sabine Parish to LA 1 southeast of Shreveport, Caddo Parish.

The route heads north from US 171 just outside Many and intersects LA 120 in Belmont. It proceeds north through Pleasant Hill, where it intersects LA 174, and crosses from Sabine Parish into DeSoto Parish shortly afterward. The highway begins to take a more northwesterly course in DeSoto Parish and passes through Pelican on the way to Mansfield.

In Mansfield, LA 175 intersects US 84 and turns west to follow that highway briefly before resuming a northern course through points such as Bayou Pierre and Holly. Just north of Kingston and a junction with LA 5, LA 175 passes through an interchange with I-49, connecting to Shreveport and Alexandria. The highway proceeds northeast through Frierson into Caddo Parish, where it reaches its terminus at LA 1 southeast of Shreveport.

== Louisiana Highway 176 ==
Louisiana Highway 176
- Location: Lafayette
- Length: 4.74 mi (7.63 km)
- Existed: 1955–present

Louisiana Highway 176 (LA 176) runs 4.74 miles (7.63 km) in a north–south direction in Lafayette, located in Lafayette Parish. It parallels US 167, the city's primary north–south highway, from a point near the downtown area to the northern limit at Carencro. (North of I-10, US 167 is co-signed with I-49.)

The route begins at US 90 and US 167, which run concurrently along Northwest and Northeast Evangeline Thruway, a couplet of one-way streets. LA 176 initially heads northeast along Jefferson Boulevard as an undivided four-lane highway. After three blocks, it turns north onto Moss Street and passes along the west side of Lafayette's City Park, crossing the Louisiana and Delta Railroad (LDRR) tracks immediately afterward. 1.2 miles (1.9 km) later, LA 176 intersects West/East Alexander Street and widens to accommodate a center turning lane. Soon afterward, the highway dips below grade and crosses underneath I-10 just east of Exit 103. LA 176 continues north for 2.2 miles (3.5 km) to an intersection with LA 98 (East Gloria Switch Road) on the Lafayette–Carencro line. LA 98 connects to Exit 2 on I-49/US 167 located 1.0 mile (1.6 km) to the west.

In the pre-1955 state highway system, the current route of LA 176 made up of the entirety of former State Route 675 and State Route C-1384. LA 176 was created in the 1955 Louisiana Highway renumbering, but it was originally a short connector between LA 94 and the junction of US 90 and US 167 in downtown Lafayette. When US 90 and US 167 were moved onto the Evangeline Thruway around 1964, LA 176 took over much of the original route of US 167. For the next 45 years, the route comprised only the portion of Jefferson Boulevard between Evangeline Thruway and the intersection of Simcoe and Surrey Streets (the former junction of LA 94 and LA 728-8). In 2009, a further re-alignment of routes in the area resulted in the LA 176 designation replacing that of former LA 728-1, greatly lengthening the route.

The entire highway is in Lafayette Parish.

Location	mi	km	Destinations	Notes
Lafayette	0.0	0.0	US 90 / US 167 (SW/SE Evangeline Thruway)	Southern terminus
Lafayette–Carencro line	4.8	7.7	LA 98 (East Gloria Switch Road)	Northern terminus
1.000 mi = 1.609 km; 1.000 km = 0.621 mi

== Louisiana Highway 177 ==
Louisiana Highway 177
- Location: Pleasant Hill–Gahagan
- Length: 17.13 mi (27.57 km)
- Existed: 1955–present

Louisiana Highway 177 (LA 177) runs 17.13 miles (27.57 km) in a north–south direction from LA 175 north of Pleasant Hill in DeSoto Parish to the concurrent US 84 and LA 1 at Gahagan, a point west of Coushatta in Red River Parish.

== Louisiana Highway 178 ==
Louisiana Highway 178
- Location: Church Point–Sunset
- Length: 10.63 mi (17.11 km)
- Existed: 1955–present

Louisiana Highway 178 (LA 178) runs 10.63 miles (17.11 km) in an east–west direction from LA 95 in Church Point, Acadia Parish to the concurrent LA 93 and LA 182 in Sunset, St. Landry Parish.

== Louisiana Highway 179 ==
Louisiana Highway 179
- Location: Coushatta
- Existed: 1955–1994

Louisiana Highway 179 (LA 179) ran in a north–south direction from US 84 to US 71 in Coushatta.

LA 179 was renumbered as a section of US 371 in 1994.

== Louisiana Highway 180 ==
Louisiana Highway 180
- Location: Pineville
- Length: 0.12 mi (190 m)
- Existed: 1955–present

Louisiana Highway 180 (LA 180) runs 0.12 miles (0.19 km) in an east–west direction along Jefferson Highway in Pineville, Rapides Parish.

The route is a short connector between US 71 and US 165 at the point where the two highways diverge in Pineville, just north of Alexandria. It is an undivided two-lane highway for its entire length.

As its local name indicates, the route was once a small part of the historic Jefferson Highway auto trail which extended from New Orleans to Winnipeg, Manitoba, Canada in the late 1910s and 1920s. When the original state highway system was created in 1921, it became part of States Routes 1 and 5. In 1926, it also served as part of the original alignment of US 71 until the completion of the O.K. Allen Bridge over the Red River in the 1930s.

LA 180 was created in the 1955 Louisiana Highway renumbering, and its route originally followed the entirety of Jefferson Highway between US 165 Business and US 71. The deleted portion, though no longer state-maintained, retains destination signage directing traffic from US 165 Business toward US 71 and US 165, heading toward Shreveport and Monroe, respectively.

The entire highway is in Pineville, Rapides Parish.

mi	km	Destinations	Notes
0.00	0.00	US 71 (Shreveport Highway) – Shreveport	Western terminus
0.12	0.19	US 165 (Monroe Highway) – Monroe	Eastern terminus
1.000 mi = 1.609 km; 1.000 km = 0.621 mi

== Louisiana Highway 181 ==
Louisiana Highway 181
- Location: Lone Pine–Cheneyville
- Length: 4.22 mi (6.79 km)
- Existed: 1955–present

Louisiana Highway 181 (LA 181) runs 4.22 miles (6.79 km) from LA 115 in Lone Pine to US 71 in Cheneyville.

== Louisiana Highway 182 ==
Louisiana Highway 182
- Location: Whiteville–Raceland
- Length: 174.307 mi (280.520 km)
- Existed: 1955–present

Louisiana Highway 182 (LA 182) runs 173.41 miles (279.08 km) from LA 29 in Whiteville to US 90 north of Raceland.

LA 182 had two hyphenated auxiliary routes, both comprising former alignments, commissioned in 2015 and decommissioned in 2022. Both routes are located in Broussard and Lafayette:

- LA 182-1 (1.029 miles (1.656 km)): West Pinhook Road from LA 182 (West Pinhook Road/Southpark Road) and LA 89-1 (Youngsville Highway/Southpark Road) to South Bernard Road and West Main Street.
- LA 182-2 (1.342 miles (2.160 km)): East Main Street from South De Porres Street to St. Etienne Road and LA 182 eastbound.

== Louisiana Highway 183 ==
Louisiana Highway 183
- Location: Richland Parish
- Length: 9.93 mi (15.98 km)
- Existed: 1955–present

Louisiana Highway 183 (LA 183) runs 9.93 miles (15.98 km) in a north–south direction from a point just south of I-20 at Holly Ridge to LA 134 west of Epps in Richland Parish.

== Louisiana Highway 184 ==
Louisiana Highway 184
- Location: Fort Johnson North
- Length: 3.38 mi (5.44 km)
- Existed: 1955–present

Louisiana Highway 184 (LA 184) runs 3.38 miles (5.44 km) in a north–south direction along Chaffee Road east of Leesville, Vernon Parish. It connects Fort Johnson North, an area within the Fort Johnson U.S. Army base with LA 28, the main highway between Leesville and Alexandria. Though its geographic direction is north–south, LA 184 is signed as an east–west route and treated accordingly in the La DOTD route log.

The route begins at the concurrent LA 8 and LA 28, 4.3 miles (6.9 km) east of US 171 in Leesville. Eastbound LA 28 connects to Alexandria in neighboring Rapides Parish. LA 185 heads south and intersects LA 468 (Slagle Road). 2.5 miles (4.0 km) later, it reaches the guard house at the entrance to Fort Johnson. State maintenance ends a short distance later at an intersection with Pendleton Drive, which leads to a residential area within the base.

In the pre-1955 state highway system, LA 184 was designated as State Route C-2040. LA 184 was created in the 1955 Louisiana Highway renumbering, and its route has remained the same to the present day.

The entire highway is in Vernon Parish.

Location	mi	km	Destinations	Notes
	0.0	0.0	LA 8 / LA 28 – Leesville, Alexandria	Western terminus
	0.7	1.1	LA 468 (Slagle Road) – Leesville, Alexandria	
Fort Johnson North	3.4	5.5	End state maintenance at Pendleton Drive	Eastern terminus
1.000 mi = 1.609 km; 1.000 km = 0.621 mi

== Louisiana Highway 185 ==
Louisiana Highway 185
- Location: Bossier City
- Length: 1.04 mi (1.67 km)
- Existed: 1955–2013

Louisiana Highway 185 (LA 185) ran 1.04 miles (1.67 km) in a northwest to southeast direction along Northgate Road in Bossier City, Bossier Parish. It connected Barksdale Air Force Base to LA 72, which leads to several main highways in the area. Destination signage on LA 72 also directs motorists onto Northgate Road to reach the Eighth Air Force Museum located within the base.

The route began at LA 72 (Old Minden Road) two blocks east of LA 3105 (Airline Drive), which connects to nearby I-20 at Exit 22. LA 185 headed southeast as an undivided four-lane highway and gained a center turning lane as it entered a residential neighborhood. It proceeded along the west side of Barksdale AFB until it reached the north gate of the facility.

In the pre-1955 state highway system, LA 185 was designated as State Route C-1333. LA 185 was created in the 1955 Louisiana Highway renumbering, and its route remained the same while in the state highway system. After rehabilitation of the roadway in 2013, La DOTD turned the route over to the government of Bossier City as part of its Road Transfer Program.

The entire highway was in Bossier City, Bossier Parish.

mi	km	Destinations	Notes
0.0	0.0	LA 72 (Old Minden Road) to I-20	Western terminus
1.1	1.8	End state maintenance at north gate of Barksdale Air Force Base	Eastern terminus
1.000 mi = 1.609 km; 1.000 km = 0.621 mi

== Louisiana Highway 191 ==
Louisiana Highway 191
- Location: Toledo Bend Reservoir–Logansport
- Length: 75.33 mi (121.23 km)
- Existed: c. 1975–present

Louisiana Highway 191 (LA 191) runs 75.33 miles (121.23 km) in a north–south direction from the Texas state line west of Leesville in Sabine Parish to US 84 east of Logansport, DeSoto Parish.

The highway travels parallel to the Toledo Bend Reservoir for its entire length and crosses the reservoir several times. Highway 191 provides access to several parks and campgrounds along the eastern shore of Toledo Bend, with the highway crossing through South Toledo Bend State Park just north of the Texas state line near Highway 392.

Major intersections

Parish	Location	mi	km	Destinations	Notes
Sabine		0.0	0.0	FM 692 south – Toledo Dam, Burkeville	Southern terminus at Texas state line; continues into Texas as FM 692
Sabine		1.7	2.7	LA 392 east – Leesville, Anacoco	
Sabine		8.9	14.3	LA 473 north – Hornbeck	
Sabine		21.8	35.1	LA 474 east – Florien	
Sabine		22.2	35.7	LA 476 east – Negreet	
Sabine		31.3	50.4	LA 6 – Many, San Augustine, Toledo Bend	
Sabine		34.6	55.7	LA 1215 west	
Sabine	Zwolle	41.1	66.1	LA 475 north – Zwolle	
Sabine		47.2	76.0	LA 1218 east – Noble	
Sabine		55.3	89.0	LA 174 east – Converse	
Sabine		61.1	98.3	LA 481 north	
DeSoto		69.4	111.7	LA 763 north	
DeSoto		75.3	121.2	US 84	Northern terminus
1.000 mi = 1.609 km; 1.000 km = 0.621 mi
