= Louisiana Highway 9 =

State highway in Louisiana, United States

Louisiana Highway 9

- Route of LA 9 highlighted in red

Route information
- Maintained by Louisiana DOTD
- Length: 100.005 mi (160.942 km)
- Existed: 1955 renumbering–present

Major junctions
- South end: US 71 / US 84 in Campti
- LA 4 in Lucky; US 80 in Arcadia; I-20 northwest of Arcadia; US 79 in Homer; LA 2 east of Homer; LA 2 Alt. in Summerfield
- North end: US 63 / US 167 in Junction City

Location
- Country: United States
- State: Louisiana
- Parishes: Natchitoches, Bienville, Claiborne

Highway system
- Louisiana State Highway System; Interstate; US; State; Scenic
← LA 8	→ I-10
← SR 11	SR 12	→ SR 13
← SR 49	SR 50	→ SR 51

Louisiana Highway 9 (LA 9) is a state highway located in northern Louisiana. It runs 100.01 miles (160.95 km) in a north–south direction from the concurrent U.S. Highways 71 and 84 (US 71-84) in Campti to a junction with the concurrent US 63 and US 167 in Junction City.

The highway traverses the thick piney woods of northern Louisiana roughly midway between the parallel US 167 and US 371 corridors. Over the northern half of its route, LA 9 connects the towns of Arcadia and Homer - the seats of Bienville and Claiborne parishes, respectively - with Interstate 20 (I-20), the main highway across northern Louisiana. LA 9 also passes through a number of smaller rural villages, such as Saline, Lucky, Bienville, Bryceland, and Athens.

== Route description ==
=== Campti to Arcadia ===
From the south, LA 9 begins at a T-intersection with the concurrent US 71/US 84 in Campti, a small town in Natchitoches Parish. The junction is located at a point on US 71 roughly midway between Alexandria and Shreveport. LA 9 heads northeast out of Campti and after 5 miles (8.0 km), the road curves due north to cross a bridge over Black Lake. Shortly afterward, LA 9 passes through the community of Creston and intersects LA 153 and LA 156, connecting with Ashland and Goldonna, respectively. LA 9 proceeds northeast through a thick pine forest and intersects LA 479 at Chestnut. Shortly before crossing into Bienville Parish, the highway passes through the small community of Readhimer. A junction there with LA 126 leads eastward to Dodson in neighboring Winn Parish.

In Bienville Parish, LA 9 immediately enters the village of Saline. Traveling along Cooper Street, the highway passes the local high school, church, and post office. It then turns west onto 4th Street, beginning a concurrency with LA 155. On the way out of Saline, the two highways make a zigzag north then west. After passing the Mill Creek Reservoir, LA 155 departs to the west toward Coushatta while LA 9 resumes its northward trajectory. Over the next 14 miles (23 km), the highway passes through three small villages. The first, Lucky, consists mainly of a junction with LA 4, a rural cross-state route connecting to nearby points Castor and Friendship. In the second, known as Bienville, LA 9 intersects LA 507, which connects to the Bienville Parish towns of Jamestown and Ringgold as well as Jonesboro, the seat of neighboring Jackson Parish. LA 9 joins the Kansas City Southern Railway (KCS) line heading into Bryceland, the third village north of Saline. Just past the local post office, LA 9 turns east at a T-intersection with LA 517. The highway then takes a northeast course as it winds through the piney woods toward Arcadia, the parish seat.

=== Arcadia to Homer ===
LA 9 enters Arcadia on Hazel Street and intersects LA 147, another connection to Jonesboro. After crossing the KCS rail line at grade, the highway enters the downtown area. LA 9 meets US 80 shortly afterward at a slightly skewed four-way intersection with 1st Street. From this intersection, LA 151 begins and proceeds north on Hazel Street toward I-20 while LA 9 turns west with US 80 onto 1st Street. Signs direct US 80 truck traffic to follow the parallel 2nd Street through the downtown area. US 80 and LA 9 travel along 1st Street for three blocks, passing by historic brick storefronts and other small commercial establishments. The route turns north onto Beech Street for one block to 2nd Street, meeting LA 519 and also rejoining the US 80 truck route. US 80 and LA 9 turn west onto 2nd Street and proceed to the town limits. Here, US 80 continues ahead while LA 9 turns northward to an interchange with I-20 at Exit 67, connecting with Shreveport to the west and Monroe to the east. LA 9 continues across the parish line into Claiborne Parish.

After about 7 miles (11 km), LA 9 passes through the village of Athens and an intersection with both LA 154 and LA 518 at Athens Avenue. This is the first of several junctions leading to nearby Lake Claiborne State Park. LA 9 continues northward for 8 miles (13 km), loosely following the short-line Louisiana and North West Railroad (LNW) toward Homer. At a point south of town, the highway reaches a junction with US 79, connecting with Minden to the southwest. LA 9 turns northeast with US 79 into Homer while US 79 Bypass (also signed as LA 9 Truck) begins and proceeds straight ahead on its journey around the west and north side of town.

=== Homer to Junction City ===
US 79 and LA 9 enter Homer, the seat of Claiborne Parish, on Minden Highway and curve due north onto West Main Street into the downtown area. An intersection with LA 146 (South 3rd Street) serves as the town's connection to Lake Claiborne State Park. Two blocks later, northbound traffic zigzags around the courthouse square to the intersection of North Main and East Main Streets. While US 79 zigzags back onto West Main Street to proceed north toward Haynesville, LA 9 turns eastward out of Homer. On the outside of town, LA 9 rejoins its truck route at a junction with LA 2, another rural cross-state route.

Over the next 14.5 miles (23.3 km), LA 9 travels northeast and skirts the Caney Ranger District of the Kisatchie National Forest. In the tiny community of Summerfield, LA 9 intersects LA 2 Alternate, connecting with Haynesville and Bernice. The route then continues through another segment of the Kisatchie National Forest and crosses a bridge over Corney Lake. About 6 miles (9.7 km) later, LA 9 enters the village of Junction City, located on the Louisiana–Arkansas state line. The route curves due east onto West 5th Street and ends two blocks later at South Main Street, a junction with US 63 and US 167 located on the Claiborne–Union parish line. US 63 and US 167 travel concurrently between Ruston, Louisiana to the south and El Dorado, Arkansas to the north.

=== Route classification and data ===
LA 9 is an undivided two-lane highway with the exception of a 1.4 miles (2.3 km) undivided four-lane segment on 2nd Street in Arcadia that is concurrent with US 80. The highway is classified by the Louisiana Department of Transportation and Development (La DOTD) as a rural major collector from Campti to Homer and as a rural minor arterial from Homer to Junction City. Daily traffic volume in 2013 peaked at 6,000 vehicles in Arcadia and 5,500 in Homer. Most of the route averaged between 2,000 and 3,500 vehicles with a low of 880 reported between Saline and Lucky. The posted speed limit is generally 55 mph (90 km/h) in rural areas, reduced as low as 30 mph (50 km/h) through Arcadia and Homer.

== History ==
=== Pre-1955 route numbering ===
In the original Louisiana Highway system in use between 1921 and 1955, the modern LA 9 was part of three separate routes.

==== Southern section ====
State Route 50
- Location: Campti–Goldonna
- Length: 17.0 mi (27.4 km)
- Existed: 1921–1955

The section from Campti to Creston made up the majority of pre-1955 State Route 50. It was created in 1921 by an act of the state legislature as one of the original 98 state highway routes.

Route 50. Beginning at Campti through Creston, to Goldonna.

— 1921 legislative route description

As the above description indicates, Route 50 departed from the modern LA 9 at Creston and followed what is now LA 156 northeast to Goldonna. The route remained generally the same throughout the pre-1955 era with minor straightening of the roadway evident in several spots. The portion of Route 50 between Campti and Creston was graveled by 1927 and paved in 1949. The remainder of the route between Creston and Goldonna was graveled in 1928 but was not paved until after the 1955 Louisiana Highway renumbering.

During the 1920s, Route 50 was part of the Lone Star Trail, an early auto trail that roughly followed the present US 84 corridor across Louisiana in the days before the numbered U.S. Highway system was implemented.

==== Middle section ====
State Route 12
- Location: Creston–Homer
- Length: 84.3 mi (135.7 km)
- Existed: 1921–1955

The middle section of LA 9 from Creston to Homer made up the majority of State Route 12, another of the original 98 state highway routes designated in 1921.

Route 12. Beginning at Arkansas State line, through Haynesville, Homer, Athens, Arcadia, Bryceland, Bienville, Saline, Chestnut to Ashland.

— 1921 legislative route description

While LA 9 changes its general trajectory by turning northeast at Homer toward Junction City, Route 12 continued northward along the present path of US 79 to the Arkansas state line via Haynesville. US 79 was placed onto the existing state highway route upon its creation in 1935, and the two remained concurrent through the pre-1955 era. However, in the 1955 Louisiana Highway renumbering, unnecessary concurrencies between U.S. and state routes were eliminated, and the LA 9 designation was instead continued along a different pre-1955 state route north of Homer.

On its south end, Route 12 was originally designated to form a "V" by heading southwest from Saline to Chestnut then turn sharply to the northwest to a terminus at Ashland. There was no improved route between Chestnut and Creston at this time. However, a gravel road between these points was established by 1927, and Route 12 was changed accordingly by an act of the state legislature. Graveling of the remainder of the distance to the Arkansas state line north of Haynesville was completed about the same time. Otherwise, the route remained largely the same prior to the 1955 renumbering with the exception of some minor straightening, such as a zigzag at Readhimer. The route through the town of Arcadia was also simplified somewhat. The original route turned west from Hazel Street onto 2nd Street, then north on Myrtle Street, west on 3rd Street, north on Beech Street, and west on 6th Street. By 1955, two turns had been eliminated as the route now followed Hazel, 1st, Beech, and 6th Streets. Remnants of these earlier paths through town survive today in the state highway system as parts of LA 519, LA 798-1, and LA 798-2.

The paving of Route 12 was carried out in sections over the course of more than twenty years. The portion beginning at the present junction of LA 9 and US 79 south of Homer and extending through town was completed first, around 1930. Paving was extended north from Homer to Haynesville about a year later. Around 1936, the paving was extended north again from Haynesville to the Arkansas state line. All paved sections of Route 12 at this time were now also part of US 79. By 1941, paving was extended southward from Homer to Arcadia. Local paving projects, such as those within the municipalities of Arcadia and Athens, had already been completed by the late 1930s. Paving was not extended south from Arcadia to Bryceland until about 1949, and the section between Chestnut and Lucky was completed by the following year. The last sections of gravel highway on either side of Chestnut were paved around 1952.

==== Northern section ====
The remainder of the route between Homer and Junction City made up the northern portion of pre-1955 State Route 115, which was added to the system in 1928. Route 115 had a second leg that extended southeast from Homer along the present LA 146 to Vienna in neighboring Lincoln Parish. The portion of the route now followed by LA 9 saw only minor changes prior to the 1955 renumbering, such as the straightening of the two portions heading out of Homer and into Junction City. Sections of the original alignment that have not been abandoned exist today as Lisbon Road in Homer and John Kelly Road in Junction City. The entire route between Homer and Junction City was graveled by 1927. Paving of the route between Homer and Antioch was completed during the early 1940s. The paved highway was extended to Summerfield around 1949 and to Junction City by 1953. Other improvements included a new bridge over Corney Lake in 1953, replacing two shorter spans.

=== Post-1955 route history ===
LA 9 was created in 1955 as a collective renumbering of portions of former State Routes 12, 50, and 115.

Class "A": La 9—From a junction with La-US 80 at or near Arcadia through or near Athens, Homer and Summerfield to a junction with La-US 167 at or near Junction City.
Class "B": La 9—From a junction with La-US 71 at or near Campti through or near Creston, Saline and Bryceland to a junction with La 147 at or near Arcadia.

— 1955 legislative route description

With the 1955 renumbering, the state highway department initially categorized all routes into three classes: "A" (primary), "B" (secondary), and "C" (farm-to-market). This system has since been updated and replaced by a more specific functional classification system.

Since the 1955 renumbering, the route of LA 9 has remained virtually the same. Most of the minor changes have resulted from the smoothing of several curves over the years, often as part of repaving projects. A modest curve east of Bryceland was straightened sometime before 1967. A number of curves between Arcadia and Athens were straightened during the 1970s. Pieces of the original roadbed survive as local roads looping off of the current alignment. A short section of highway hugging the Louisiana and North West Railroad line at Mulnix was re-routed around the same time. The original alignment there followed what is now Dansby Road. The most recent improvements have occurred in Natchitoches Parish. A sharp curve at a defunct crossing of the Kansas City Southern Railway was smoothed out in 2010. In November of that year, a new bridge over Black Lake was opened, replacing a lower span that was prone to flooding.

== Major intersections ==
Parish	Location	mi	km	Destinations	Notes
Natchitoches	Campti	0.000	0.000	US 71 / US 84 – Shreveport, Alexandria	Southern terminus
Natchitoches		4.884– 5.779	7.860– 9.300	Bridge over Black Lake	
Natchitoches	Creston	6.881– 6.970	11.074– 11.217	LA 153 north – Ashland LA 156 east – Goldonna	Southern terminus of LA 153; western terminus of LA 156
Natchitoches	Chestnut	13.326	21.446	LA 479 south – Goldonna	Northern terminus of LA 479
Natchitoches	Readhimer	17.452	28.086	LA 126 east – Dodson	Western terminus of LA 126
Bienville	Saline	21.054– 21.071	33.883– 33.910	LA 155 north (4th Street) – Friendship	Southern end of LA 155 concurrency
Bienville		23.992	38.611	LA 155 south – Coushatta	Northern end of LA 155 concurrency
Bienville	Lucky	29.530– 29.567	47.524– 47.583	LA 4 – Friendship, Castor	
Bienville	Bienville	36.924	59.423	LA 507 north (Main Street) – Jonesboro	Southern end of LA 507 concurrency
Bienville	Bienville	37.037	59.605	LA 507 south – Jamestown, Ringgold	Northern end of LA 507 concurrency
Bienville	Bryceland	43.437	69.905	LA 517 north – Gibsland	Southern terminus of LA 517
Bienville	Arcadia	51.318– 51.364	82.588– 82.662	LA 147 south (Jonesboro Road) – Jonesboro	Northern terminus of LA 147
Bienville	Arcadia	51.689	83.185	LA 798-3 (Locust Street)	Eastern terminus of LA 798-3
Bienville	Arcadia	51.967	83.633	US 80 east (First Street) US 80 Truck west / LA 151 north (Hazel Street) to I-20	Southern end of US 80 concurrency; eastern terminus of US 80 Truck; southern terminus of LA 151
Bienville	Arcadia	52.250	84.088	US 80 Truck east / LA 798-1 (Second Street) LA 519 north (Beech Street)	Western terminus of US 80 Truck and LA 798-1; southern terminus of LA 519
Bienville	Arcadia	53.616	86.287	US 80 west – Gibsland	Northern end of US 80 concurrency
Bienville	Arcadia	53.723	86.459	LA 798-2 east (Sixth Street)	Western terminus of LA 798-2
Bienville		53.951– 54.344	86.826– 87.458	I-20 – Shreveport, Monroe	Exit 67 on I-20
Claiborne	Athens	61.938	99.680	LA 154 west / LA 518 (Athens Avenue)	Eastern terminus of LA 154; to Lake Claiborne State Park
Claiborne	Athens	62.384	100.397	LA 805 south	Northern terminus of LA 805
Claiborne		70.209	112.990	US 79 south – Minden US 79 Byp. north / LA 9 Truck north	Southern end of US 79 concurrency; southern terminus of US 79 Byp. and LA 9 Truck
Claiborne	Homer	73.068	117.592	LA 146 east (South 3rd Street)	Western terminus of LA 146; to Lake Claiborne State Park
Claiborne	Homer	73.169– 73.277	117.754– 117.928	US 79 north (West Main Street) – Haynesville LA 3062 west (North Main Street)	Northern end of US 79 concurrency; eastern terminus of LA 3062
Claiborne		74.933– 75.037	120.593– 120.760	LA 2 / LA 9 Truck south – Bernice, Cotton Valley	Northern terminus of LA 9 Truck; to Lake Claiborne State Park
Claiborne	Summerfield	89.490	144.020	LA 2 Alt. west – Haynesville	Southern end of LA 2 Alt. concurrency
Claiborne	Summerfield	89.639	144.260	LA 2 Alt. east – Bernice	Northern end of LA 2 Alt. concurrency
Claiborne		93.290– 93.472	150.136– 150.429	Bridge over Corney Lake	
Claiborne–Union parish line	Junction City	100.005	160.942	US 63 / US 167 (South Main Street) – El Dorado, Ruston	Northern terminus
1.000 mi = 1.609 km; 1.000 km = 0.621 mi: Concurrency terminus

== Truck route ==
=== Louisiana Highway 9 Truck ===
Louisiana Highway 9 Truck
- Location: Homer
- Length: 6.929 mi (11.151 km)
- Existed: 2011–present

Louisiana Highway 9 Truck (LA 9 Truck) runs 6.95 miles (11.18 km) in a semi-circle around the west and north sides of Homer, the seat of Claiborne Parish. The route utilizes the entirety of US 79 Bypass as well as a section of LA 2 to allow truck traffic to bypass the town and avoid having to navigate around the courthouse square.

From the south, LA 9 Truck begins at an intersection with mainline LA 9 and US 79, connecting with Arcadia to the southeast and Minden to the southwest, respectively. The route proceeds north co-signed with US 79 Bypass and travels along the west side of Homer. After 4 miles (6.4 km), US 79 Bypass and LA 9 Truck turn east to follow LA 2 along the north side of town. Shortly after crossing the Louisiana and North West Railroad (LNW) line, the US 79 Bypass designation ends upon re-joining its parent route. LA 9 Truck continues southeast with LA 2 for another 1.7 miles (2.7 km) to an intersection with mainline LA 9 on the northeast side of Homer.

LA 9 Truck is an undivided two-lane highway for its entire length. The portion that is concurrent with US 79 Bypass is classified as a rural minor arterial by the Louisiana Department of Transportation and Development (La DOTD). The remainder of the route is classified as a rural major collector. The average daily traffic volume in 2013 was reported as ranging between 2,100 and 2,900 vehicles. The posted speed limit is generally 55 mph (90 km/h) on the north–south segment and 45 mph (70 km/h) on the east–west segment.

The north–south section of US 79 Bypass was an addition to the state highway system constructed in 2011. The entire portion of LA 2 co-signed as LA 9 Truck was constructed in 1964, bypassing the original alignment through town now designated as LA 3062.

The entire highway is in Claiborne Parish.

Location	mi	km	Destinations	Notes
	0.000	0.000	US 79 / LA 9 north – Homer, Minden LA 9 south – Arcadia US 79 Byp. begins	Southern terminus of US 79 Byp. and LA 9 Truck; southern end of US 79 Byp. concurrency
	2.672	4.300	LA 3062	
	3.907	6.288	LA 2 west – Cotton Valley	Southern end of LA 2 concurrency
	4.053	6.523	LA 540	
Homer	5.224	8.407	US 79 – Haynesville, Minden US 79 Byp. ends	Northern terminus of US 79 Byp.; northern end of US 79 Byp. concurrency
	6.929	11.151	LA 2 east – Bernice; LA 9 – Homer, Junction City	Northern terminus; northern end of LA 2 concurrency
1.000 mi = 1.609 km; 1.000 km = 0.621 mi: Concurrency terminus
