= Louisiana Highway 2 =

State highway in Louisiana, United States

Louisiana Highway 2
- LA 2 highlighted in red

Route information
- Maintained by Louisiana DOTD
- Length: 189.490 mi (304.955 km)
- Existed: 1955 renumbering–present
- Tourist routes: Louisiana Scenic Byway: Boom or Bust Byway

Major junctions
- West end: SH 49 at Texas state line west of Trees
- LA 1 in Vivian; I-49 / US 71 in Hosston; US 371 in Sarepta; US 79 / LA 9 in Homer; US 63 / US 167 in Bernice; LA 15 / LA 33 in Farmerville; US 165 in Sterlington; US 425 in Bastrop; US 165 / US 425 in Mer Rouge; LA 17 in Oak Grove
- East end: US 65 north of Lake Providence

Location
- Country: United States
- State: Louisiana
- Parishes: Caddo, Bossier, Webster, Claiborne, Union, Ouachita, Morehouse, West Carroll, East Carroll

Highway system
- Louisiana State Highway System; Interstate; US; State; Scenic
← LA 1	→ LA 3

Louisiana Highway 2 (LA 2) is a state highway located in northern Louisiana. It runs 189.49 miles (304.95 km) in an east–west direction from the Texas state line southwest of Vivian to a junction with U.S. Highway 65 (US 65) near Lake Providence, just west of the Mississippi state line.

It is the northernmost cross-state highway in Louisiana and runs between Interstate 20 (I-20) and the Arkansas state line for its entire distance. LA 2 spans nine parishes, connecting five parish seats (Note: Lake Providence is counted as one of the five parish seats connected by LA 2 since the eastern terminus comes within 1.0 mile (1.6 km) of the town limit.) with direct connections to the remaining four, traveling through Homer, Bastrop, and smaller communities such as Hosston, Plain Dealing, Sarepta, Bernice, Farmerville, Mer Rouge, and Oak Grove. LA 2 also has intersections with many of the state's major north–south routes, such as LA 1, US 71, US 371, US 167, US 165, and at its eastern terminus, US 65. An interchange with the newly constructed extension of I-49 was scheduled to be completed in Spring 2013 and opened to traffic later in the year.

== Route description ==
=== Texas state line to Homer ===
From the west, LA 2 begins at the Texas state line, continuing the route of Texas State Highway 49 (SH 49) into northern Caddo Parish, Louisiana. LA 2 proceeds east as an undivided two-lane highway through the community of Trees then curves to the northeast and back to the east around the tip of Caddo Lake to intersect LA 1 at a point 3.1 miles (5.0 km) north of Oil City. LA 2 turns north, running concurrent with LA 1 along the Kansas City Southern Railway (KCS) tracks into Vivian. The highway widens to accommodate a center turning lane at Rebel Road. LA 2 then turns northeast onto Camp Road while LA 1 continues northward. Returning to two-lane capacity, LA 2 is now joined by LA 170 which follows LA 1 through much of Vivian. After two blocks, LA 170 turns south onto South Pardue Street while LA 2 turns north and then east out of town. After 4.8 miles (7.7 km), LA 2 enters Hosston, where it intersects US 71, which heads through Ida into Arkansas on the north and to Shreveport on the south. From this junction, LA 2 turns north onto US 71 briefly before resuming its eastward course. 3.0 miles (4.8 km) outside of Hosston, LA 2 crosses a bridge over the Red River and into Bossier Parish.

In Bossier Parish, LA 2 intersects LA 537 and continues east for another 3.7 miles (6.0 km) into Plain Dealing. LA 2 follows Mary Lee Street through town and intersects LA 3 (Louisiana Street), which also connects to Shreveport. Proceeding east from this intersection, LA 2 widens to an undivided four-lane highway. It then crosses the Union Pacific Railroad (UP) tracks and shortly thereafter intersects LA 157 (North Magnolia Street), which takes a northeastern course toward Springhill. LA 157 joins LA 2 eastward out of Plain Dealing, narrowing again to two lanes, before turning south toward Rocky Mount. LA 2 continues due east for 10.5 miles (16.9 km) before intersecting LA 529 (Emma Cemetery Road). Soon after this intersection, LA 2 crosses Bodcau Bayou into Webster Parish.

In Webster Parish, LA 2 enters Sarepta and intersects US 371, which heads north into Cullen and Springhill and south into Minden. After crossing this intersection, LA 2 immediately turns north onto South Main Street, running parallel to US 371 briefly before turning to the northeast. LA 2 is also signed from this point directly west to US 371, allowing drivers from either direction to bypass the short Main Street segment in favor of US 371. (This connector is officially LA 2 Spur). At a point 2.6 miles (4.2 km) northeast of Sarepta, LA 2 intersects LA 802, which travels northwest to US 371 at Porterville and Bunker. LA 2 then dips slightly to the south and crosses Bayou Dorcheat at a point known as Sykes Ferry. It then curves back to the northeast toward Shongaloo where it intersects LA 159. Here LA 2 Alternate begins and runs eastward through Haynesville, eventually meeting back up with LA 2 in Bernice. Meanwhile, LA 2 turns southward and runs concurrent with LA 159 to a point known as Leton. At an intersection with LA 160, which heads west to Cotton Valley, LA 159 continues southward to Minden while LA 2 turns to the southeast. Before crossing into Claiborne Parish, LA 2 intersects LA 521, which heads north to Millerton near the Arkansas state line.

After crossing the parish line, LA 2 intersects LA 534 Spur at a point known as Blackburn. After 3.4 miles (5.5 km), LA 2 intersects LA 534 itself, which heads north toward Haynesville and south toward Minden. Curving due east, LA 2 intersects LA 3062 which splits off to the southeast into downtown Homer, the parish seat, while LA 2 slightly bypasses the town to the north. Nearing the northwest corner of Homer, LA 2 intersects and begins a concurrency with US 79 Byp., a western bypass of the town that is also designated as the LA 9 truck route. Just after this intersection, the three concurrent highways intersect LA 540, another route into Homer. After crossing the Louisiana and North West (LNW) short-line railroad, the highways intersect US 79. From this intersection, US 79 heads north to Haynesville and southwest through Homer to Minden; US 79 Byp. ends, having reached its parent route; and LA 2 and LA 9 Truck continue eastward out of Homer.

=== Homer to Bastrop ===
Just east of Homer, LA 2 intersects LA 9, ending the concurrency with LA 9 Truck. LA 9 heads northeast through Summerfield to Junction City and south through Homer to points such as Athens and Arcadia. LA 2 continues due east past the northern end of Lake Claiborne then intersects LA 806, which travels through a point known as Arizona. After 5.6 miles (9.0 km), LA 2 intersects LA 518 in Lisbon. LA 518 provides a connection to Lake Claiborne State Park at Aycock to the south. Before exiting Claiborne Parish, LA 2 intersects LA 152, which splits off to the southeast toward Dubach.

LA 2 crosses into Union Parish and continues east, entering Bernice on 8th Street. It then intersects US 63/US 167, which runs northbound along Cherry Street toward Junction City and southbound along Plum Street toward Ruston. LA 2 turns north for four blocks, running briefly concurrent with US 63/US 167, to 4th Street where it meets the eastern terminus of LA 2 Alt. LA 2 then turns east, narrowing again to two lanes, and follows 4th Street out of Bernice. 1.0 mile (1.6 km) outside the town limit, LA 2 intersects LA 550, after which it curves to the southeast through Shiloh. LA 2 then continues in a general eastward direction for 8.3 miles (13.4 km) before making the first of several crossings over parts of Bayou D'Arbonne Lake. Shortly afterward, LA 2 enters the town of Farmerville, the parish seat. Here it turns south onto North Main Street, running concurrent with LA 15. One block later at Miller Street, LA 33 is added to the concurrency, having entered from the direction of Marion to the northeast. After passing through the center of town, LA 2 turns east onto East Water Street, gaining a center turning lane, while LA 15/LA 33 continues southward across Bayou D'Arbonne Lake toward Monroe and Ruston, respectively. At Holder Road, the center lane disappears, and LA 2 becomes an undivided two-lane highway again.

7.0 miles (11.3 km) east of the Farmerville city limits, LA 2 intersects LA 828 then turns to the southeast, intersecting LA 143 at a point known as Crossroads. LA 143 connects to Monroe on the south. LA 2 and LA 143 begin a concurrency that lasts for 6.4 miles (10.3 km), crossing Bayou De Loutre and turning back to the east, until reaching a point just south of Spencer where LA 143 turns north toward Marion. LA 2 then curves back to the southeast and crosses the Ouachita River into the town of Sterlington in Ouachita Parish. In Sterlington, LA 2 intersects LA 553 which follows the Ouachita River southward. On the southeast end of town, LA 2 intersects US 165 north of Monroe. LA 2 turns north, running concurrent with the divided four-lane US 165, and crosses from Ouachita Parish into Morehouse Parish.

On the parish line, at a point known as Perryville, US 165 and LA 2 intersect LA 554, which heads east to Collinston. The two highways continue to the northeast, roughly parallel to Bayou Bartholomew, for 6.0 miles (9.7 km) (becoming an un-divided four-lane highway at Henry Avenue) to Point Pleasant and an intersection with LA 592 (Point Pleasant Road). US 165/LA 2 then curves to the east and enters the city of Bastrop.

=== Bastrop to eastern terminus ===
US 165 and LA 2 enter Bastrop on Madison Avenue. As they approach the center of town, eastbound traffic continues east on Madison while westbound traffic follows parallel Jefferson Avenue. At the city's main junction, US 165 and LA 2 intersect US 425, LA 139, and LA 593 which travel northbound on Franklin Street and southbound on Washington Street. At this junction of five highways, US 425 and LA 593 continue north toward the Arkansas state line; LA 139 begins and heads south into Monroe; LA 593 heads south into Collinston; and US 165 and LA 2 are joined by US 425 eastward out of town. At an intersection with LA 830-5 (Elm Street), the median gives way to a center turning lane. Several other minor state routes are encountered on the east side of Bastrop: LA 830-6 (McCreight Street), LA 830-4 (Cooper Lake Road), LA 3051 (Grabault Road), and LA 830-3 (Peach Orchard Road). At the intersection with LA 3051, the highway narrows again to two lanes.

3.6 miles (5.8 km) past the intersection with LA 830-3, the three concurrent highways enter the village of Mer Rouge on Davenport Avenue, its main street. Beginning at 18th Street, a median divides the street's two lanes. Reaching the village's main junction, which lies on either side of the Union Pacific Railroad tracks, US 165 turns northward toward Bonita and into Arkansas; US 425 turns south toward points such as Oak Ridge and Rayville; LA 138 begins and heads south toward Collinston; and LA 2 continues on its own as an undivided two-lane highway. After running due east for a distance of 11.4 miles (18.3 km), LA 2 crosses the Boeuf River into West Carroll Parish.

After crossing the parish line, LA 2 turns to the northeast and intersects LA 585 at Goodwill. After 4.3 miles (6.9 km), LA 2 intersects LA 582 at Redwing. LA 582 heads eastward through Forest. Several more minor routes are encountered on the way into Oak Grove, the parish seat: LA 878, LA 597, LA 587, and LA 879. LA 2 follows Main Street through Oak Grove, gaining a center turning lane, and intersects LA 17 (Constitution Avenue), which heads northward to Kilbourne and southward eventually to Delhi on I-20. Continuing east from LA 17, the center turn lane disappears, and LA 2 returns to an undivided two-lane highway for the remainder of its route. Just east of Oak Grove, LA 2 intersects LA 589, another route into Forest, then crosses Bayou Macon into East Carroll Parish. LA 2 travels east for a final 6.9 miles (11.1 km) before reaching its eastern terminus, US 65, at Highland, a point just north of Lake Providence.

=== Byway designation ===
Nearly the entire route of LA 2 west of Lisbon constitutes the main path of the Boom or Bust Byway in the state-designated system of tourist routes known as the Louisiana Scenic Byways.

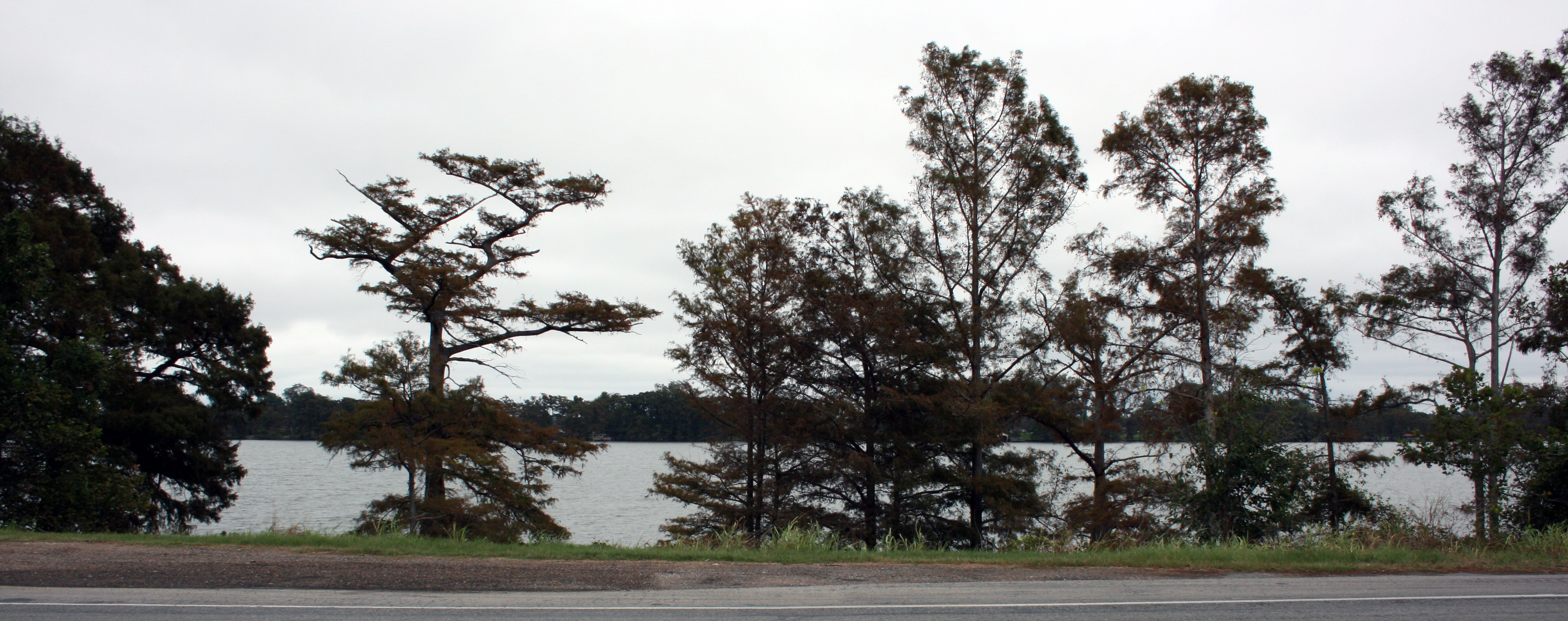
View of Lake Providence across US 65 from the east end of LA 2

== History ==
=== Pre-1955 route numbering ===
In the original Louisiana Highway system in use between 1921 and 1955, the modern LA 2 made up parts of several routes, including State Route 202 from the western terminus at the Texas state line to the intersection with the modern LA 1 south of Vivian; State Route 8 to Vivian; State Route 109 to Plain Dealing; State Route 70 to Shongaloo; State Route 66 to Leton; State Route 490 to Homer; State Route 11 to Lisbon; State Route 489 to Bernice; State Route 11 again to Farmerville; State Route 815 to the intersection with the modern LA 143 west of Sterlington; and State Route 11 once again to the eastern terminus north of Lake Providence.

=== Alignment changes since 1955 ===
LA 2 was created with the 1955 Louisiana Highway renumbering, and its route has seen two significant alignment changes—the bypassing of Homer and a re-routing through Webster Parish—and a series of other improvements.

LA 2 originally followed LA 3062 into downtown Homer. Upon reaching the intersection with US 79 and LA 9 at the courthouse square, LA 2 continued east out of town co-signed with LA 9. The current alignment bypassing Homer to the north was opened in 1964, eliminating the concurrency with LA 9 and creating LA 3062 along the remainder of the bypassed route. The other major alignment change shifted much of the route through Webster Parish. From the Bayou Dorcheat bridge at Sykes Ferry (the original western terminus of LA 2 Alt.), LA 2 turned southeast onto Fire Tower Road to LA 160. It then followed current LA 160 and Leton Cutoff Road to Leton. Here it turned south onto current LA 159 and east onto Pistol Thomas Road, rejoining the current alignment just west of Blackburn. LA 2 assumed its current alignment between Sykes Ferry and Leton in the early 1970s following what was previously LA 2 Alt. to Shongaloo and co-signed with LA 159 to Leton. The western terminus of LA 2 Alt. was then truncated to its current location at Shongaloo.

Other alignment changes have included the creation of a one-way pair through Bastrop around 1969 with Madison Avenue converted to carry westbound traffic only and Jefferson Avenue added to carry eastbound traffic; the slight relocation of the intersection with US 165 at Sterlington around 1982 (Waterside Drive northeast of Old Sterlington Road is a remnant of the original connection); the streamlining of the junction at Leton about the same time; the shift onto a new bridge over Bayou Dorcheat at Sykes Ferry around 1984; and the re-routing onto a parallel street through Plain Dealing (LA 2 originally followed Palmetto Street east of LA 3). More minor alignment changes resulted from the smoothing of several curves along the route, mostly in Claiborne and Union parishes. Remnants of the original route exist today as short sections of local roads such as Old Homer Road near Blackburn, Old Lisbon Road at LA 806, Rocky Springs Road at LA 518, and Ben Lowery Road east of Shiloh.

More recent alterations have included: a change of connector in Vivian, slightly shortening the route by following Camp Road instead of East Arkansas Avenue; the widening of US 63/US 167 to four lanes through Bernice, much of which is concurrent with LA 2, by converting Cherry Street to carry northbound traffic only and parallel Plum Street added to carry southbound traffic; and lastly, the construction of a high-level bridge over the Ouachita River slightly shifted the alignment at Sterlington. The new bridge, opened in July 2009, replaced the original swing bridge completed in 1932 during the administration of Governor Huey P. Long. The original bridge existed just to the south of the current span and has been demolished, but the approach roads still exist. The approach on the Union Parish side is now a local road while that on the Ouachita Parish side is now an extension of LA 553 as the height of the new bridge prevents LA 2 and LA 553 to intersect at the original location.

== Future ==
Construction is currently underway by the Louisiana Department of Transportation and Development (La DOTD) to extend I-49 north from Shreveport to the Arkansas state line parallel to US 71, a project scheduled for completion in 2016. An interchange with LA 2 has been constructed east of Hosston and is set to open in Summer 2013 along with all but the southernmost portion of the project on the northwest side of Shreveport.

== Major intersections ==
Parish	Location	mi	km	Destinations	Notes
Caddo	Trees	0.000	0.000	SH 49 – Jefferson	Western terminus; continuation in Texas
Caddo		4.559– 4.586	7.337– 7.380	LA 1 south – Shreveport	Western end of LA 1 concurrency
Caddo	Vivian	8.020	12.907	LA 1 north / LA 170 west (South Pine Street) – Atlanta	Eastern end of LA 1 concurrency; western end of LA 170 concurrency
Caddo	Vivian	8.267	13.304	LA 170 east (South Pardue Street) – Gilliam	Eastern end of LA 170 concurrency
Caddo	Hosston	14.896	23.973	US 71 south – Shreveport	Western end of US 71 concurrency
Caddo	Hosston	15.406	24.794	US 71 north – Ida	Eastern end of US 71 concurrency
Caddo		16.366– 16.571	26.339– 26.668	I-49 – Shreveport, Texarkana	Exit 237 on I-49
Caddo		18.676– 19.267	30.056– 31.007	Bridge over Red River	
Bossier		21.982	35.377	LA 537 north	Southwestern terminus of LA 537
Bossier	Plain Dealing	25.949– 25.989	41.761– 41.825	LA 3 (North Louisiana Street) – Bossier City, Lewisville	
Bossier	Plain Dealing	26.435	42.543	LA 157 north (North Magnolia Street) – Springhill	Western end of LA 157 concurrency
Bossier		27.397	44.091	LA 157 south	Eastern end of LA 157 concurrency
Bossier		37.895	60.986	LA 529 south (Emma Cemetery Road) – Emma Cemetery	Northern terminus of LA 529
Webster	Sarepta	41.074	66.102	US 371 – Cotton Valley, Springhill, Cullen	
Webster	Sarepta	41.416	66.653	LA 2 Spur	Eastern terminus of LA 2 Spur
Webster		45.011	72.438	LA 802 west	Eastern terminus of LA 802
Webster	Shongaloo	51.620	83.074	LA 2 Alt. east – Haynesville LA 159 north – Springhill	Western terminus of LA 2 Alt.; western end of LA 159 concurrency
Webster	Leton	57.429– 57.459	92.423– 92.471	LA 159 south – Minden LA 160 west – Cotton Valley	Eastern end of LA 159 concurrency; eastern terminus of LA 160
Webster	Leton	57.986	93.319	LA 521	
Claiborne	Blackburn	60.769	97.798	LA 534 Spur north – Haynesville	Southern terminus of LA 534 Spur
Claiborne		64.183	103.293	LA 534 – Haynesville, Minden	
Claiborne		65.680	105.702	LA 3062 east	Western terminus of LA 3062
Claiborne		68.921	110.918	US 79 Byp. / LA 9 Truck south – Minden	Western end of US 79 Byp. and LA 9 Truck concurrencies
Claiborne		69.066	111.151	LA 540	
Claiborne	Homer	70.237	113.035	US 79 – Haynesville, Minden US 79 Byp. ends	Northern terminus of US 79 Byp.; eastern end of US 79 Byp. concurrency
Claiborne		71.942– 72.059	115.779– 115.968	LA 9 – Homer, Junction City LA 9 Truck ends	Northern terminus of LA 9 Truck; eastern end of LA 9 Truck concurrency
Claiborne		75.691	121.813	LA 806 south (Arizona Road) – Arizona	Northern terminus of LA 806
Claiborne	Lisbon	81.340	130.904	LA 518 west – Lake Claiborne Dam, Aycock	Eastern terminus of LA 518; to Lake Claiborne State Park
Claiborne		85.912	138.262	LA 152 east – Dubach	Western terminus of LA 152
Union	Bernice	94.866– 94.936	152.672– 152.785	US 63 / US 167 south (Plum Street, Cherry Street) – Ruston	Western end of US 63/US 167 concurrency; one-way pair
Union	Bernice	95.251– 95.321	153.292– 153.404	US 63 / US 167 north / LA 2 Alt. west (Plum Street, Cherry Street) – Junction City, Haynesville	Eastern end of US 63/US 167 concurrency; eastern terminus of LA 2 Alt.; one-way pair
Union		96.865	155.889	LA 550	Southern terminus of LA 550
Union		107.980– 108.124	173.777– 174.009	Alvin Green Memorial Bridge over Lake D'Arbonne (or Bayou D'Arbonne Lake)	
Union	Farmerville	111.251	179.041	LA 15 north (North Main Street) – Spearsville	Western end of LA 15 concurrency
Union	Farmerville	111.331	179.170	LA 33 north (Miller Street) – Marion	Western end of LA 33 concurrency; to Farmerville Stadium
Union	Farmerville	111.803	179.929	LA 15 / LA 33 south (South Main Street) – Ruston	Eastern end of LA 15 and LA 33 concurrencies
Union		120.339	193.667	LA 828	Eastern terminus of LA 828
Union	Crossroads	123.439	198.656	LA 143 south – Rocky Branch, West Monroe	Western end of LA 143 concurrency
Union		129.788– 129.907	208.874– 209.065	LA 143 north – Marion	Eastern end of LA 143 concurrency
Union–Ouachita parish line	Sterlington	132.009– 132.874	212.448– 213.840	Bridge over Ouachita River	
Ouachita	Sterlington	132.988	214.023	LA 553 (Old Highway 2)	Northern terminus of LA 553; to Sterlington Recreation Area
Ouachita	Sterlington	135.052– 135.104	217.345– 217.429	US 165 south – Monroe	Western end of US 165 concurrency
Ouachita	Sterlington	135.640	218.291	LA 136	Northern terminus of LA 136
Ouachita–Morehouse parish line	Perryville	138.266	222.518	LA 554	Western terminus of LA 554
Morehouse	Point Pleasant	144.289	232.211	LA 592 (Point Pleasant Road)	Southern terminus of LA 592
Morehouse	Bastrop	146.429– 146.495	235.655– 235.761	US 425 north / LA 139 south / LA 593 (Washington Street, Franklin Street) – Monroe, Hamburg	Western end of US 425 concurrency; northern terminus of LA 139; one-way pair; to Chemin-A-Haut State Park
Morehouse	Bastrop	147.095	236.726	LA 830-5 (Elm Street)	Northern terminus of LA 830-5
Morehouse	Bastrop	147.205	236.903	LA 830-6 (McCreight Street)	Southern terminus of LA 830-6
Morehouse	Bastrop	147.557	237.470	LA 830-4 (Cooper Lake Road)	Southwestern terminus of LA 830-4
Morehouse	Bastrop	148.832	239.522	LA 3051 (Grabault Road)	Western terminus of LA 3051
Morehouse	Bastrop	149.320	240.307	LA 830-3 (Peach Orchard Road)	Southeastern terminus of LA 830-3
Morehouse	Mer Rouge	154.035	247.895	US 165 north / LA 138 south (14th Street) – Bonita, Collinston	Eastern end of US 165 concurrency; northern terminus of LA 138
Morehouse	Mer Rouge	154.057	247.931	US 425 south / LA 133 south (East Davenport Avenue) – Oak Ridge	Eastern end of US 425 concurrency; northern terminus of LA 133
Morehouse–West Carroll parish line		165.483– 165.583	266.319– 266.480	Bridge over Boeuf River	
West Carroll	Goodwill	167.623	269.763	LA 585 – Kilbourne, Holly Ridge	
West Carroll	Redwing	171.930	276.695	LA 582 east	Western terminus of LA 582
West Carroll		174.387	280.649	LA 878	Southern terminus of LA 878
West Carroll		175.748	282.839	LA 597 – Forest	Northern terminus of LA 597
West Carroll		178.286	286.924	LA 587	Eastern terminus of LA 587
West Carroll	Oak Grove	178.885	287.888	LA 879 (Fiske Union Road)	Eastern terminus of LA 879
West Carroll	Oak Grove	179.681	289.169	LA 17 (Constitution Avenue) – Forest, Kilbourne	
West Carroll		182.118	293.091	LA 589	Eastern terminus of LA 589
East Carroll		189.451– 189.490	304.892– 304.955	US 65 – Lake Providence, Eudora	Eastern terminus
1.000 mi = 1.609 km; 1.000 km = 0.621 mi: Concurrency terminus

== Special routes ==
=== Shongaloo–Bernice alternate route ===
Louisiana Highway 2 Alternate
- Location: Shongaloo–Bernice
- Length: 43.059 mi (69.297 km)
- Existed: 1955 renumbering–present

Louisiana Highway 2 Alternate (LA 2 Alt.) runs 43.06 miles (69.30 km) in an east–west direction from Shongaloo to Bernice, connecting to LA 2 at either end. LA 2 Alt. parallels the route of LA 2 to the north, traveling through the town of Haynesville where it intersects US 79.

LA 2 Alt. is an anomaly in the current state highway system, being the only special state route designated in the 1955 renumbering and the only "Alternate" state route. (Note: Several special routes were designated for U.S. routes in the 1955 renumbering, and special state routes have since been added.) Its route has seen only one major change, the relocation of its western terminus from Sykes Ferry to Shongaloo in the early 1970s. The intervening route was assumed by LA 2, which was re-routed through Webster Parish at this time, shortening LA 2 Alt. by 5.0 miles (8.0 km).

=== Sarepta spur route ===
Louisiana Highway 2 Spur
- Location: Sarepta
- Length: 0.128 mi (206 m)
- Existed: c. 1959–present

Louisiana Highway 2 Spur (LA 2 Spur) provides a direct connection between westbound LA 2 and northbound US 371 in Sarepta.

From the east, as LA 2 turns south onto Main Street, LA 2 Spur continues straight ahead to US 371, a distance of 0.13 miles (0.21 km) on an undivided two-lane roadway. LA 2 Spur also allows LA 2 traffic from either direction to bypass the brief section of the route running along Main Street in favor of the parallel US 371. This is facilitated by the route being signed simply as LA 2 with directional markers at US 371 leading back to the actual LA 2.

LA 2 Spur was created around 1959 when LA 7 (now US 371), formerly concurrent with LA 2 along Main Street, was shifted onto a parallel alignment through Sarepta.

The entire highway is in Sarepta, Webster Parish.

mi	km	Destinations	Notes
0.128	0.206	US 371 – Cotton Valley, Springhill, Cullen	Western terminus
0.000	0.000	LA 2 west (South Main Street) LA 2 east – Shongaloo	Eastern terminus
1.000 mi = 1.609 km; 1.000 km = 0.621 mi
