= U.S. Route 63 in Louisiana =

Highway in Louisiana

U.S. Highway 63
- Route of US 63 highlighted in red

Route information
- Maintained by Louisiana DOTD
- Length: 35.402 mi (56.974 km)
- Existed: 1999–present

Major junctions
- South end: I-20 / US 167 / LA 146 in Ruston
- LA 2 in Bernice; LA 15 in Lillie; LA 9 in Junction City
- North end: US 63 / US 167 at Arkansas state line in Junction City

Location
- Country: United States
- State: Louisiana
- Parishes: Lincoln, Union

Highway system
- United States Numbered Highway System; List; Special; Divided; Louisiana State Highway System; Interstate; US; State; Scenic
← LA 62	→ LA 63

U.S. Highway 63 (US 63) is a part of the United States Numbered Highway System that spans 1,286 miles (2,070 km) from Ruston, Louisiana to a point southwest of Ashland, Wisconsin. Within the state of Louisiana, the highway travels 35.40 miles (56.97 km) from the national southern terminus at the junction of Interstate 20 (I-20), US 167, and Louisiana Highway 146 (LA 146) in Ruston to the Arkansas state line at Junction City.

The route is entirely concurrent with US 167 within Louisiana and northward to El Dorado, Arkansas. From the diamond interchange with I-20 in Ruston, located roughly midway between the cities of Minden and Monroe, US 63 winds through the piney hills of rural Lincoln and Union parishes. The highway passes through several small communities, including Vienna, Dubach, Bernice, and Lillie. The point in Junction City where US 63 and US 167 cross the state line also forms the junction of two Louisiana parishes, one Arkansas county, and three congressional districts.

US 63 is Louisiana's most recent U.S. Highway designation, although it has existed outside the state since 1926. Its southern terminus was previously located in Memphis, Tennessee, carried into the city from Turrell, Arkansas via I-55. In 1999, the American Association of State Highway and Transportation Officials (AASHTO) approved a relocation and extension of the route south from West Memphis, Arkansas over existing U.S. and state highways to its current terminus in Ruston, Louisiana. US 63 is currently the only U.S. Highway in Louisiana with the same number as an active state highway, although LA 63 is located at a sufficient distance to prevent confusion to motorists.

== Route description ==
=== Ruston to Bernice ===
From the south, US 63 begins at a diamond interchange with I-20 (exit 85) in Ruston, a city in Lincoln Parish. The interstate connects with the metropolitan areas of Shreveport to the west and Monroe to the east. US 63 heads north through the interchange overlapping the routes of both US 167 and LA 146. It is initially a divided four-lane highway with twin overpasses across I-20 via the one-way pair of North Trenton and North Vienna Streets. Almost immediately beyond the interstate, however, the travel lanes converge as North Trenton Street widens to an undivided four-lane highway with a center turning lane. US 63 proceeds in this capacity through the suburban area north of downtown Ruston and into the small rural town of Vienna. Here, LA 146 departs to the west, but US 63 will remain paired with US 167 throughout the remainder of its distance in Louisiana.

Heading north through Vienna, the center lane gives way to a grassy median, and the highway begins to wind gently through the pine forests of northern Louisiana on a broad right-of-way. After passing through an area known as Unionville, US 63 enters Dubach and becomes locally known as McMullen Street. The right-of-way narrows and regains its center lane through the small town. Passing one block to the west of the old Main Street, US 63 briefly overlaps LA 151 as the latter zigzags between Annie Lee and Hico Streets. North of Dubach, the highway widens again and crosses into Union Parish about two miles (3.2 km) north of LA 545.

=== Bernice to Junction City ===
In Union Parish, the highway enters another small town known as Bernice, where it divides onto the one-way pair of Cherry Street (northbound) and Plum Street (southbound). During this stretch, US 63 overlaps LA 2, which zigzags through town between 8th Street and 4th Street. LA 2 is a rural cross-state route connecting with Homer to the west and Farmerville to the east. North of 4th Street, US 63 begins to overlap LA 2 Alt., which utilizes the highway to connect to its parent route. About six blocks later, the one-way pair converges, and US 63 proceeds as an undivided four-lane highway with center lane until LA 2 Alt. turns off to the west toward Haynesville.

Regaining its median and wide right-of-way, US 63 travels due north through the village of Lillie. Here, it intersects the northern terminus of LA 15 just west of Spearsville. North of Lillie, the highway curves to the northwest and travels for about seven miles (11 km) before reaching the larger village of Junction City. US 63 turns due north as the median is replaced by a center lane for the final time. Simultaneously, the highway begins to travel along the Union–Claiborne parish line while following South Main Street. The intersection of Main and Fifth Streets forms the northern terminus of LA 9, another connection to Homer, Claiborne's parish seat. Just two blocks later, at an intersection with Third Street, US 63 crosses the state line into the Arkansas portion of Junction City. Here, a roadside marker identifies the community as being located "at the junction of 2 states, 1 county, 2 parishes, and 3 congressional districts." US 63 proceeds north toward El Dorado, Arkansas still co-signed with US 167.

=== Route classification and data ===
US 63 is classified by the Louisiana Department of Transportation and Development (La DOTD) as an urban principal arterial in Ruston and as a rural principal arterial northward. Daily traffic volume in 2013 peaked at 18,900 vehicles in Ruston near the I-20 interchange and generally remained between 2,500 and 5,000 vehicles otherwise. The posted speed limit is 65 mph (105 km/h) along the rural divided four-lane segments, reduced to 45 mph (70 km/h) along undivided four-lane portions and through most towns. It is reduced even further to 35 mph (55 km/h) within the city of Ruston and the town of Bernice.

== History ==
=== Extension into Louisiana ===
US 63 was designated in November 1926 as one of the original routes of the numbered U.S. Highway system. It initially traveled from a junction with US 61 at Turrell, Arkansas (a point northwest of Memphis, Tennessee) to Des Moines, Iowa. In 1999, the American Association of State Highway and Transportation Officials (AASHTO) approved a relocation and extension of the route that moved its southern terminus to its present location in Ruston, Louisiana. At this point, US 63 had terminated in Memphis proper by way of a concurrency with I-55. The change pulled the route back out of Tennessee and extended it southward from West Memphis, Arkansas for approximately 287 miles (462 km) over existing U.S. and state highways. The portion south of El Dorado, including its entire distance within Louisiana, overlapped part of US 167. In accordance with this decision, the Louisiana Department of Transportation and Development (La DOTD) added US 63 shields to the existing signage installations along US 167 between Ruston and the Arkansas state line. As of 2016, however, US 63 has not been added to the exit signage on I-20 at the new southern terminus.

US 63 is Louisiana's most recent U.S. Highway designation, and it became the first within the state to terminate at an interstate highway. It is also the state's only U.S. Highway with the same number as a current state highway (LA 63). In the past, state highways were renumbered when the introduction of a U.S. Highway caused such a duplication. However, LA 63 exists in a different region of Louisiana with confusion to motorists being highly unlikely.

=== TIMED improvements ===
Upon its extension into Louisiana in 1999, US 63 was a two-lane highway outside of the Ruston city limits. However, plans had been underway for over a decade to widen the entire corridor to four lanes as part of an improvement project for the concurrent US 167. In 1989, the Louisiana Legislature approved the Transportation Infrastructure Model for Economic Development, or TIMED, program. Declared as "the single largest transportation infrastructure improvement program" in the state's history, it was initially funded from a 4¢ per gallon gasoline tax which allowed an estimated completion date around 2031. After falling far behind schedule by the late 1990s, the legislature approved the first of several bond measures to fast-track the program, which included the widening of US 167 from Alexandria to the Arkansas state line (including the US 63 concurrency). The work was carried out in stages throughout the 2000s and into the following decade.

In rural areas, the existing right-of-way was broadened to carry a divided four-lane highway with a wide median. The original road bed generally followed the present southbound lanes. In towns and other developed areas, the highway was widened to carry four travel lanes and a center lane with the major exception being the town of Bernice, where a one-way pair was used. Minor deviations from the original right-of-way occurred in Lincoln Parish between Vienna and Unionville, where a series of curves were straightened somewhat. Several portions of the old road survive as dead-end local roads in this area. The widening of US 167 was one of the last TIMED projects to be completed when it was opened to traffic in the summer of 2014.

== Major intersections ==
Parish	Location	mi	km	Destinations	Notes
Lincoln	Ruston	0.000– 0.190	0.000– 0.306	I-20 – Monroe, Shreveport US 167 south / LA 146 east (North Trenton Street, North Vienna Street) – Ruston	Southern terminus; southern end of US 167 and LA 146 concurrencies (one-way pair); exit 85 on I-20
Lincoln	Vienna	3.732	6.006	LA 146 west – Homer; LA 3072	Western terminus of LA 3072; northern end of LA 146 concurrency; to Lake Claiborne State Park
Lincoln		8.514	13.702	LA 822 west	Southern end of LA 822 concurrency
Lincoln	Unionville	9.516	15.315	LA 822 east	Northern end of LA 822 concurrency
Lincoln	Dubach	11.724	18.868	LA 151 east (Annie Lee Street) – Farmerville, Downsville	Southern end of LA 151 concurrency
Lincoln	Dubach	11.871	19.105	LA 151 west (Hico Street) – Arcadia, Homer; LA 824-3 (East Hico Street)	Western terminus of LA 824-3; northern end of LA 151 concurrency
Lincoln	Dubach	11.947	19.227	LA 824-2 (Wynn Street)	Western terminus of LA 824-2
Lincoln		14.374	23.133	LA 545 – Hico, Downsville	
Union	Bernice	20.185	32.485	LA 2 west (8th Street) – Homer	Southern end of LA 2 concurrency
Union	Bernice	20.500	32.992	LA 2 east (East 4th Street) – Farmerville LA 2 Alt. ends	Eastern terminus of LA 2 Alt.; northern end of LA 2 concurrency; southern end of LA 2 Alt. concurrency; to Lake D'Arbonne State Park
Union	Bernice	21.557	34.693	LA 2 Alt. west (Summerfield Highway) – Haynesville	Northern end of LA 2 Alt. concurrency
Union	Lillie	27.416	44.122	LA 15 – Spearsville, Farmerville	Northern terminus of LA 15
Union	Junction City	35.251	56.731	LA 9 south (West Fifth Street) – Homer, Shreveport	Northern terminus of LA 9
Union	Junction City	35.402	56.974	US 63 north / US 167 north (North Main Street) – El Dorado	Continuation in Arkansas
1.000 mi = 1.609 km; 1.000 km = 0.621 mi: Concurrency terminus

== See also ==
U.S. Route 63
Previous state: Terminus	Louisiana	Next state: Arkansas
