= Louisiana Highway 2 Alternate =

State highway in Louisiana, United States

Louisiana Highway 2 Alternate

- Route of LA 2 Alt. highlighted in red

Route information
- Auxiliary route of LA 2
- Maintained by Louisiana DOTD
- Length: 43.059 mi (69.297 km)
- Existed: 1955 renumbering–present

Major junctions
- West end: LA 2 / LA 159 in Shongaloo
- US 79 in Haynesville; LA 9 in Summerfield
- East end: US 63 / US 167 / LA 2 in Bernice

Location
- Country: United States
- State: Louisiana
- Parishes: Webster, Claiborne, Union

Highway system
- Louisiana State Highway System; Interstate; US; State; Scenic

Louisiana Highway 2 Alternate (LA 2 Alt.) is a state highway located in northern Louisiana. It runs 43.06 miles (69.30 km) in an east–west direction from Shongaloo to Bernice, connecting to its parent route at either end.

LA 2 Alt. parallels the route of LA 2 to the north, traveling through the town of Haynesville, where it intersects U.S. Highway 79 (US 79). It is the only "Alternate" state route in Louisiana.

== Route description ==
From the west, LA 2 Alt. begins at an intersection with LA 2 and LA 159 in Shongaloo. While LA 2 turns to the south co-signed with LA 159, LA 2 Alt. heads due east and crosses from Webster Parish into Claiborne Parish. Just across the parish line, LA 2 Alt. intersects LA 521. It then continues eastward for 4.0 miles (6.4 km) and enters the town of Haynesville. Here it intersects LA 534, crosses the Louisiana and North West Railroad (LNW) tracks, and intersects US 79. LA 2 Alt. turns south, approaching the center of town and overlapping US 79 for one block, before resuming an eastward course along Sherman Street. On the east edge of town, LA 2 Alt. intersects LA 807.

After 5.7 miles (9.2 km), LA 2 Alt. intersects LA 161 at a point known as Gordon and curves to the southeast. 3.8 miles (6.1 km) later, it intersects LA 520, and the two highways engage in a brief concurrency until LA 520 turns north at Colquitt. LA 2 Alt. continues southeast for another 8.9 miles (14.3 km) to Summerfield. Here it zigzags briefly onto LA 9 before continuing southeast for 7.4 miles (11.9 km) to Weldon, where it crosses into Union Parish.

LA 2 Alt. proceeds southeast into the town of Bernice, where it intersects and turns south onto the concurrent US 63/US 167. Approaching the center of town, eastbound (or southbound) traffic proceeds onto Plum Street while westbound (or northbound) traffic follows Cherry Street. LA 2 Alt. ends six blocks later when it reaches its parent route at 4th Street.

LA 2 Alt. is an undivided two-lane highway for its entire length, except for the brief divided four-lane segment concurrent with US 63/US 167 at its eastern end.

== History ==
In the original Louisiana Highway system in use between 1921 and 1955, the entire route of LA 2 Alt. was part of State Route 70.

LA 2 Alt. is an anomaly in the current system, being the only special state route designated in the 1955 renumbering and the only "Alternate" state route. (Note: Several special routes were designated for U.S. routes in the 1955 renumbering, and special state routes have since been added.) Its route has seen only one major change, the relocation of its western terminus from Sykes Ferry to Shongaloo in the early 1970s. The intervening route was assumed by LA 2, which was re-routed through Webster Parish at this time, shortening LA 2 Alt. by 5.0 miles (8.0 km). The only other change resulted from the recent widening of US 63/US 167 to four lanes in Bernice, concurrent with LA 2 Alt. at its eastern end, via the one-way pair of Plum and Cherry Streets.

== Major intersections ==
Parish	Location	mi	km	Destinations	Notes
Webster	Shongaloo	0.000	0.000	LA 2 west – Sarepta LA 2 east / LA 159 – Leton, Springhill	Western terminus
Claiborne		4.547	7.318	LA 521 – Millerton, Leton	
Claiborne	Haynesville	9.709	15.625	LA 534 south	Northern terminus of LA 534
Claiborne	Haynesville	9.887	15.912	US 79 north – Magnolia	Western end of US 79 concurrency
Claiborne	Haynesville	9.943	16.002	US 79 south – Homer	Eastern end of US 79 concurrency
Claiborne	Haynesville	10.932	17.593	LA 807 north	Southern terminus of LA 807
Claiborne	Gordon	16.633– 16.704	26.768– 26.882	LA 161 north – El Dorado	Southern terminus of LA 161
Claiborne		20.496	32.985	LA 520 south – Homer	Western end of LA 520 concurrency
Claiborne	Colquitt	21.270	34.231	LA 520 north	Eastern end of LA 520 concurrency
Claiborne	Summerfield	30.147	48.517	LA 9 south – Homer	Western end of LA 9 concurrency
Claiborne	Summerfield	30.291	48.749	LA 9 north – El Dorado	Eastern end of LA 9 concurrency
Union	Bernice	42.014	67.615	US 63 / US 167 north – Junction City	Western end of US 63/US 167 concurrency
Union	Bernice	43.059	69.297	US 63 / US 167 south / LA 2 west (Plum Street, Cherry Street) – Ruston LA 2 east (4th Street) – Farmerville	Eastern terminus; eastern end of US 63/US 167 concurrency; one-way pair
1.000 mi = 1.609 km; 1.000 km = 0.621 mi: Concurrency terminus
