= Louisiana Highway 161 =

State highway in Louisiana, United States

Louisiana Highway 161

- Route of LA 161 highlighted in red

Route information
- Maintained by Louisiana DOTD
- Length: 4.285 mi (6.896 km)
- Existed: 1955 renumbering–present

Major junctions
- South end: LA 2 Alt. in Gordon
- North end: AR 15 at Arkansas state line northeast of Gordon

Location
- Country: United States
- State: Louisiana
- Parishes: Claiborne

Highway system
- Louisiana State Highway System; Interstate; US; State; Scenic
← LA 160	→ LA 162

Louisiana Highway 161 (LA 161) is a state highway located in Claiborne Parish, Louisiana. It runs 4.29 miles (6.90 km) in a southwest to northeast direction from LA 2 Alt. in Gordon to the Arkansas state line.

The route is entirely rural, providing a connection between highways leading to Haynesville and Homer in Claiborne Parish with Arkansas Highway 15 leading to El Dorado, Arkansas. Though it travels diagonally, LA 161 carries north–south directional banners.

== Route description ==
From the southwest, LA 161 begins at an intersection with LA 2 Alt. at Gordon, a point 5.7 miles (9.2 km) east of Haynesville in Claiborne Parish. The route proceeds northeast through a rural area covered by pine forests. After 3.2 miles (5.1 km), LA 161 intersects LA 520, which heads south to LA 2 Alt. at a point known as Colquitt. 1.0 mile (1.6 km) later, after having curved slightly to the north, LA 161 crosses the state line into Union County, Arkansas, where it continues toward El Dorado as Arkansas Highway 15 (AR 15).

The route is classified as a rural major collector by the Louisiana Department of Transportation and Development (La DOTD) with an average daily traffic volume of 920 in 2013. LA 161 is an undivided two-lane highway for its entire length and has a posted speed limit of 55 mph (90 km/h).

== History ==
In the original Louisiana Highway system in use between 1921 and 1955, the modern LA 161 was part of State Route 557. Route 557 was designated in 1930 by an act of the state legislature. Its route comprised several disconnected segments branching out from the Homer area, many of which were decommissioned prior to the 1955 Louisiana Highway renumbering.

La 161—From a junction with La 2 "Alt" at or near Gordon northeast to the Arkansas state line.

— 1955 legislative route description

LA 161 was created in the 1955 renumbering following the northernmost segment of former Route 557. Its route has remained the same to the present day.

== Major intersections ==
The entire highway is in Claiborne Parish.

Location	mi	km	Destinations	Notes
Gordon	0.000– 0.027	0.000– 0.043	LA 2 Alt. – Haynesville, Summerfield	Southern terminus
	3.237	5.209	LA 520 south – Summerfield	Northern terminus of LA 520
	4.285	6.896	AR 15 north (Haynesville Highway) – El Dorado	Northern terminus; continuation in Arkansas
1.000 mi = 1.609 km; 1.000 km = 0.621 mi
