= Louisiana Highway 824 =

State highway in Louisiana, United States

Louisiana Highway 824

- Routes of all LA 824 segments highlighted in red

Route information
- Maintained by Louisiana DOTD
- Length: 0.377 mi (607 m)
- Existed: 1955 renumbering–present

Location
- Country: United States
- State: Louisiana
- Parishes: Lincoln

Highway system
- Louisiana State Highway System; Interstate; US; State; Scenic
← LA 823	→ LA 825

Louisiana Highway 824 (LA 824) is a collection of three state-maintained streets located in the Lincoln Parish town of Dubach that have a total length of 0.38 miles (0.61 km). All three routes were established in the 1955 Louisiana Highway renumbering and are presently unsigned. As of 2017, the routes are currently under agreement to be transferred to local control.

== Louisiana Highway 824-1 ==
Louisiana Highway 824-1
- Location: Dubach
- Length: 0.236 mi (380 m)
- Existed: 1955–present

Louisiana Highway 824-1 (LA 824-1) runs 0.24 miles (0.39 km) in a north–south direction along Main Street from LA 151 (Annie Lee Street) to LA 824-2 (Wynn Street). It is an undivided two-lane highway for its entire length.

The entire highway is in Dubach, Lincoln Parish.

mi	km	Destinations	Notes
0.000	0.000	LA 151 (Annie Lee Street)	Southern terminus
0.160	0.257	LA 824-3 (East Hico Street)	Eastern terminus of LA 824-3
0.236	0.380	LA 824-2 (Wynn Street)	Northern terminus of LA 824-1; eastern terminus of LA 824-2
1.000 mi = 1.609 km; 1.000 km = 0.621 mi

== Louisiana Highway 824-2 ==
Louisiana Highway 824-2
- Location: Dubach
- Length: 0.071 mi (114 m)
- Existed: 1955–present

Louisiana Highway 824-2 (LA 824-2) runs 0.07 miles (0.11 km) in an east–west direction along Wynn Street from the concurrent US 63/US 167 (McMullen Street) to LA 824-1 (Main Street). It is an undivided two-lane highway for its entire length.

The entire highway is in Dubach, Lincoln Parish.

mi	km	Destinations	Notes
0.000	0.000	US 63 / US 167 (McMullen Street) – Bernice, Ruston	Western terminus
0.071	0.114	LA 824-1 (Main Street)	Eastern terminus of LA 824-2; northern terminus of LA 824-1
1.000 mi = 1.609 km; 1.000 km = 0.621 mi

== Louisiana Highway 824-3 ==
Louisiana Highway 824-3
- Location: Dubach
- Length: 0.070 mi (113 m)
- Existed: 1955–present

Louisiana Highway 824-3 (LA 824-3) runs 0.07 miles (0.11 km) in an east–west direction along East Hico Street from the junction of the concurrent US 63/US 167 with LA 151 at McMullen Street to a junction with LA 824-1 (Main Street). It is an undivided two-lane highway for its entire length.

The entire highway is in Dubach, Lincoln Parish.

mi	km	Destinations	Notes
0.000	0.000	US 63 / US 167 / LA 151 east (McMullen Street) – Bernice, Ruston LA 151 west (Hico Street) – Arcadia, Homer	Western terminus
0.070	0.113	LA 824-1 (Main Street)	Eastern terminus
1.000 mi = 1.609 km; 1.000 km = 0.621 mi
