= Lake End, Louisiana =

- Unincorporated community
- Location within the state of Louisiana Lake End, Louisiana (the United States)
- Coordinates: 31°55′18″N 93°18′18″W
- Country: United States
- State: Louisiana
- Parish: Red River
- Time zone: UTC-6 (Central (CST))
  - Summer (DST): UTC-5 (CDT)
- GNIS feature ID: 536280

Lake End is an unincorporated community in the southern part of Red River Parish, Louisiana, United States. It is located off Interstate 49 (exit 155) near the intersection of Louisiana Highway 1 and Louisiana Highway 174.
