= Louisiana Highway 830 =

State highway in Louisiana, United States

Louisiana Highway 830

Route information
- Maintained by Louisiana DOTD

Location
- Country: United States
- State: Louisiana

Highway system
- Louisiana State Highway System; Interstate; US; State; Scenic
← LA 828	→ LA 833

Louisiana Highway 830 is a collection of six state highways which serve Bastrop in Morehouse Parish.

== Louisiana Highway 830-1 ==
Louisiana Highway 830-1
- Location: Bastrop
- Length: 2.84 mi (4.57 km)

Louisiana Highway 830-1 (LA 830-1) spans 2.84 miles (4.57 km) from west to east and is known as Pleasant Drive, Van Avenue, and Harrington Avenue. It connects LA 592 to US 425. LA 830-1 also serves as the terminus for LA 592.

=== Junction list ===
The entire highway is in Bastrop, Morehouse Parish.

mi	km	Destinations	Notes
0.00	0.00	LA 592 (Cave Off Rd.)	
2.84	4.57	US 425 / LA 593	
1.000 mi = 1.609 km; 1.000 km = 0.621 mi

== Louisiana Highway 830-2 ==
Louisiana Highway 830-2
- Location: Bastrop
- Length: 2.95 mi (4.75 km)

Louisiana Highway 830-2 (LA 830-2) spans 2.95 miles (4.75 km) from south to north and is known as Shelton Road. From the south, LA 830-2 begins at an intersection with US 425. It ends at an at-grade crossing with the AL&M RR.

=== Junction list ===
The entire highway is in Bastrop, Morehouse Parish.

mi	km	Destinations	Notes
0.00	0.00	US 425	
2.95	4.75	End state maintenance; AL&M RR	
1.000 mi = 1.609 km; 1.000 km = 0.621 mi

== Louisiana Highway 830-3 ==
Louisiana Highway 830-3
- Location: Bastrop
- Length: 3.60 mi (5.79 km)

Louisiana Highway 830-3 (LA 830-3) spans 3.60 miles (5.79 km) from west to east and is known as Cherry Ridge Road. From the west, LA 830-3 begins at an intersection with US 425. It crosses LA 830-6, known as McCreight Street. It then serves as the terminus for LA 830-4, known as Cooper Lake Road. LA 830-3 ends at an intersection with US 165, US 425, and LA 2.

=== Junction list ===
The entire highway is in Bastrop, Morehouse Parish.

mi	km	Destinations	Notes
0.00	0.00	US 425	
0.33	0.53	LA 830-6	
2.12	3.41	LA 830-4	
3.60	5.79	US 165 / US 425 / LA 2	
1.000 mi = 1.609 km; 1.000 km = 0.621 mi

== Louisiana Highway 830-4 ==
Louisiana Highway 830-4
- Location: Bastrop
- Length: 1.72 mi (2.77 km)

Louisiana Highway 830-4 (LA 830-4) spans 1.72 miles (2.77 km) from west to east and is known as Cooper Lake Road. From the south, LA 830-4 begins at an intersection with US 165/US 425/LA 2. It ends at an intersection with LA 830-3 to the east.

=== Junction list ===
The entire highway is in Bastrop, Morehouse Parish.

mi	km	Destinations	Notes
0.00	0.00	US 165 / US 425 / LA 2	
1.72	2.77	LA 830-3	
1.000 mi = 1.609 km; 1.000 km = 0.621 mi

== Louisiana Highway 830-5 ==
Louisiana Highway 830-5
- Location: Bastrop
- Length: 1.44 mi (2.32 km)

Louisiana Highway 830-5 (LA 830-5) spans 1.44 miles (2.32 km) from south to north and is known as Elm Street. From the south, LA 830-5 begins at an intersection with LA 593. It ends at an intersection with US 165/US 425/Louisiana Highway 2 to the north.

=== Junction list ===
The entire highway is in Bastrop, Morehouse Parish.

mi	km	Destinations	Notes
0.00	0.00	LA 593	
1.44	2.32	US 165 / US 425 / LA 2	
1.000 mi = 1.609 km; 1.000 km = 0.621 mi

== Louisiana Highway 830-6 ==
Louisiana Highway 830-6
- Location: Bastrop
- Length: 1.55 mi (2.49 km)

Louisiana Highway 830-6 (LA 830-6) spans 1.55 miles (2.49 km) from south to north and is known as McCreight Lane. From the south, LA 830-6 begins at an intersection with US 165/US 425/Louisiana Highway 2. It crosses LA 830-3, known as Cherry Ridge Road, before ending at US 425.

=== Junction list ===
The entire highway is in Bastrop, Morehouse Parish.

mi	km	Destinations	Notes
0.00	0.00	US 165 / US 425 / LA 2	
1.11	1.79	LA 830-3	
1.55	2.49	US 425	
1.000 mi = 1.609 km; 1.000 km = 0.621 mi
