= Creston, Louisiana =

- Unincorporated community
- Hamlet of Creston
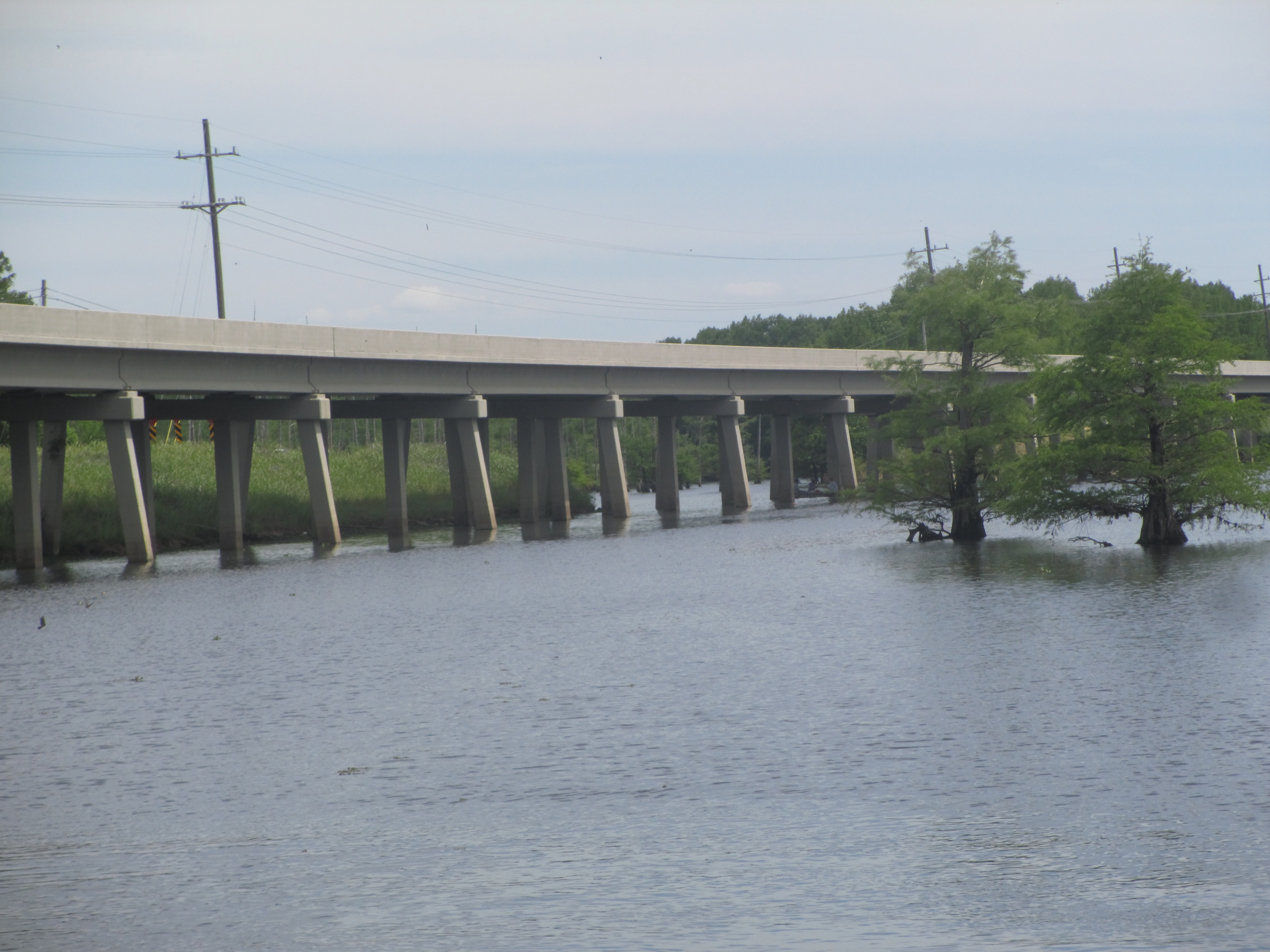
- Concrete bridge carries traffic on Louisiana State Highway 9 over Black Lake near Creston.

- Location within Louisiana Location within the United States
- Coordinates: 31°58′34″N 93°03′00″W
- Country: United States
- State: Louisiana
- Parish: Natchitoches
- Elevation: 161 ft (49 m)

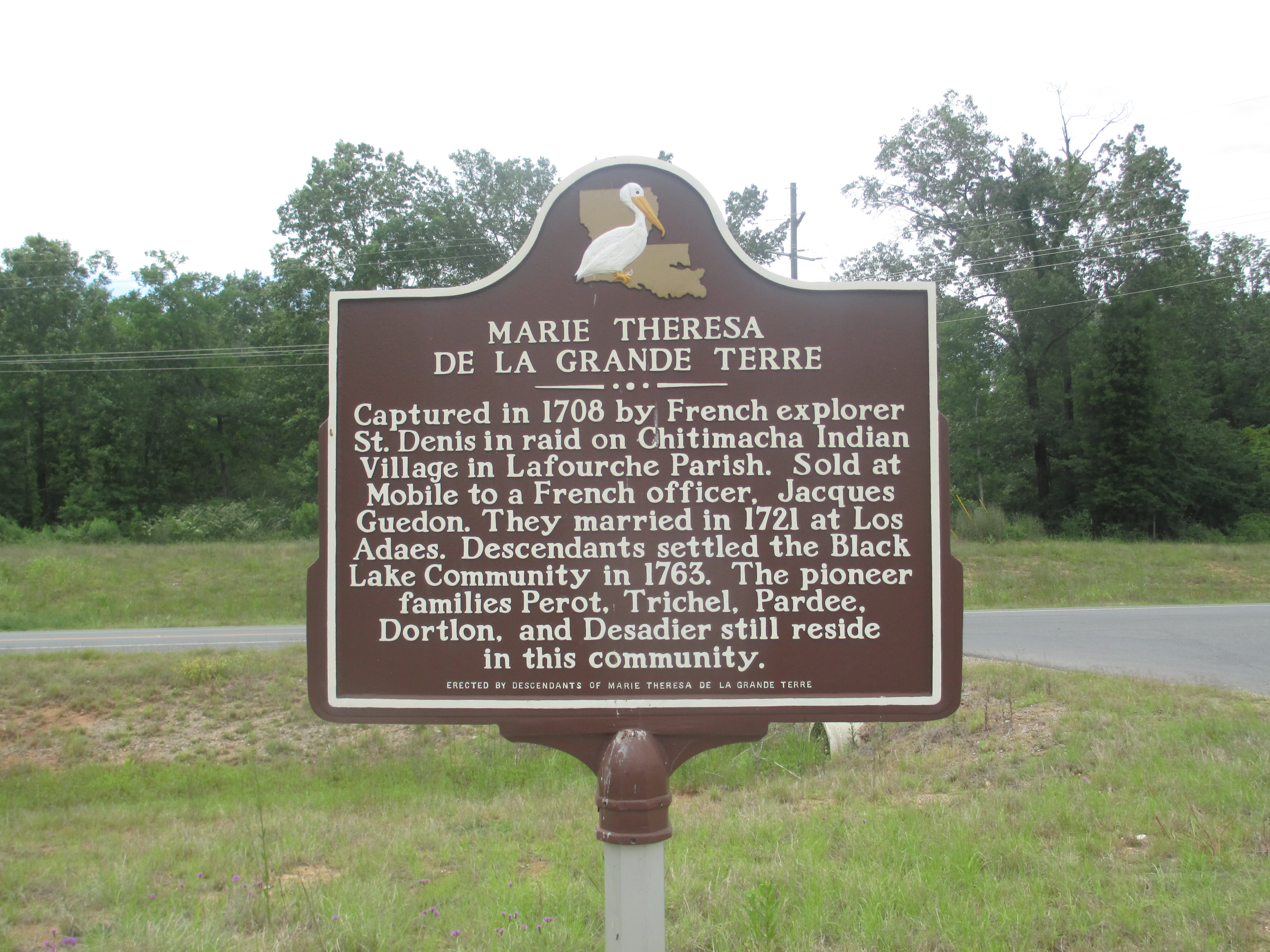
Historical marker of Black Lake community at Creston

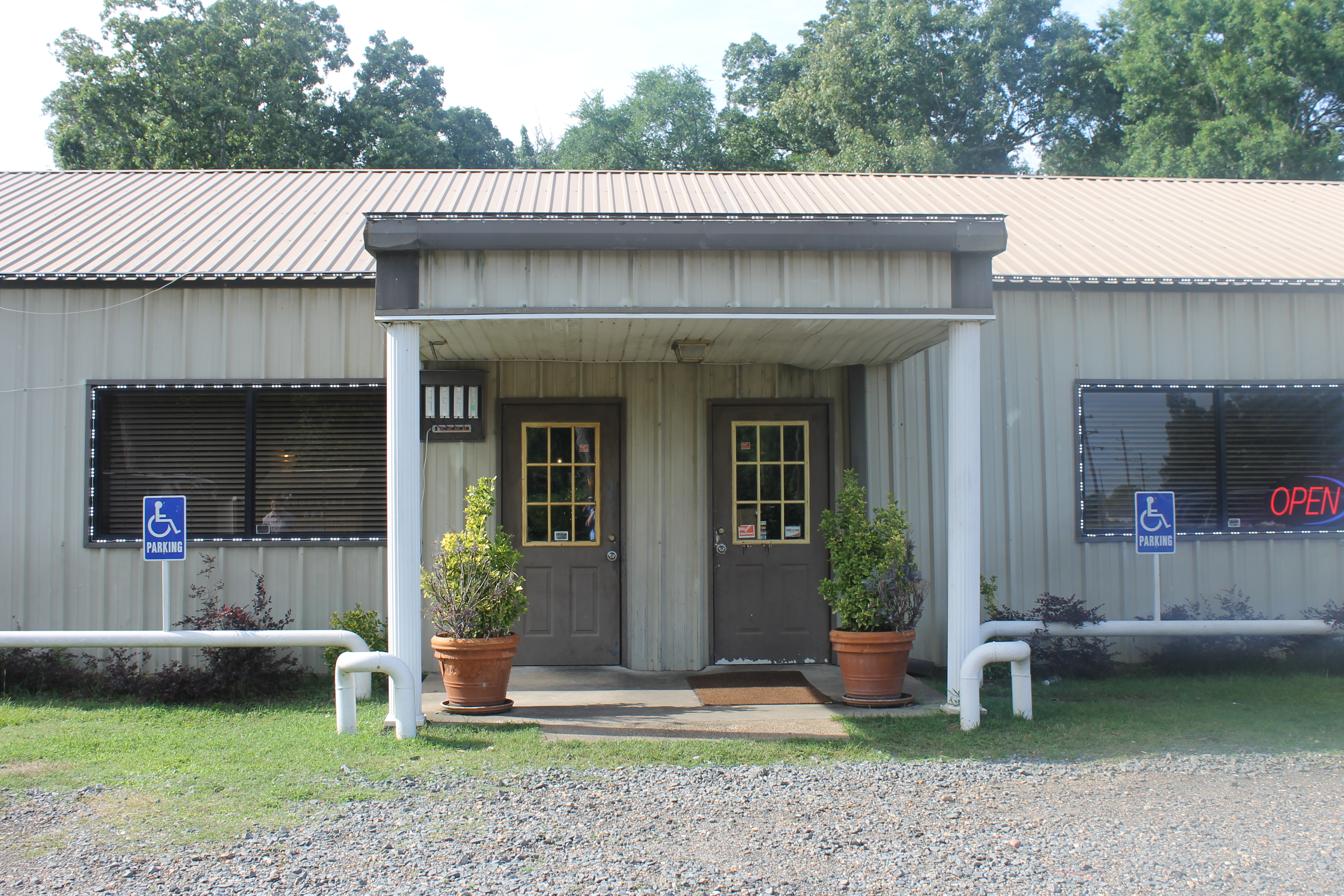
Lakewood Catfish House in Creston

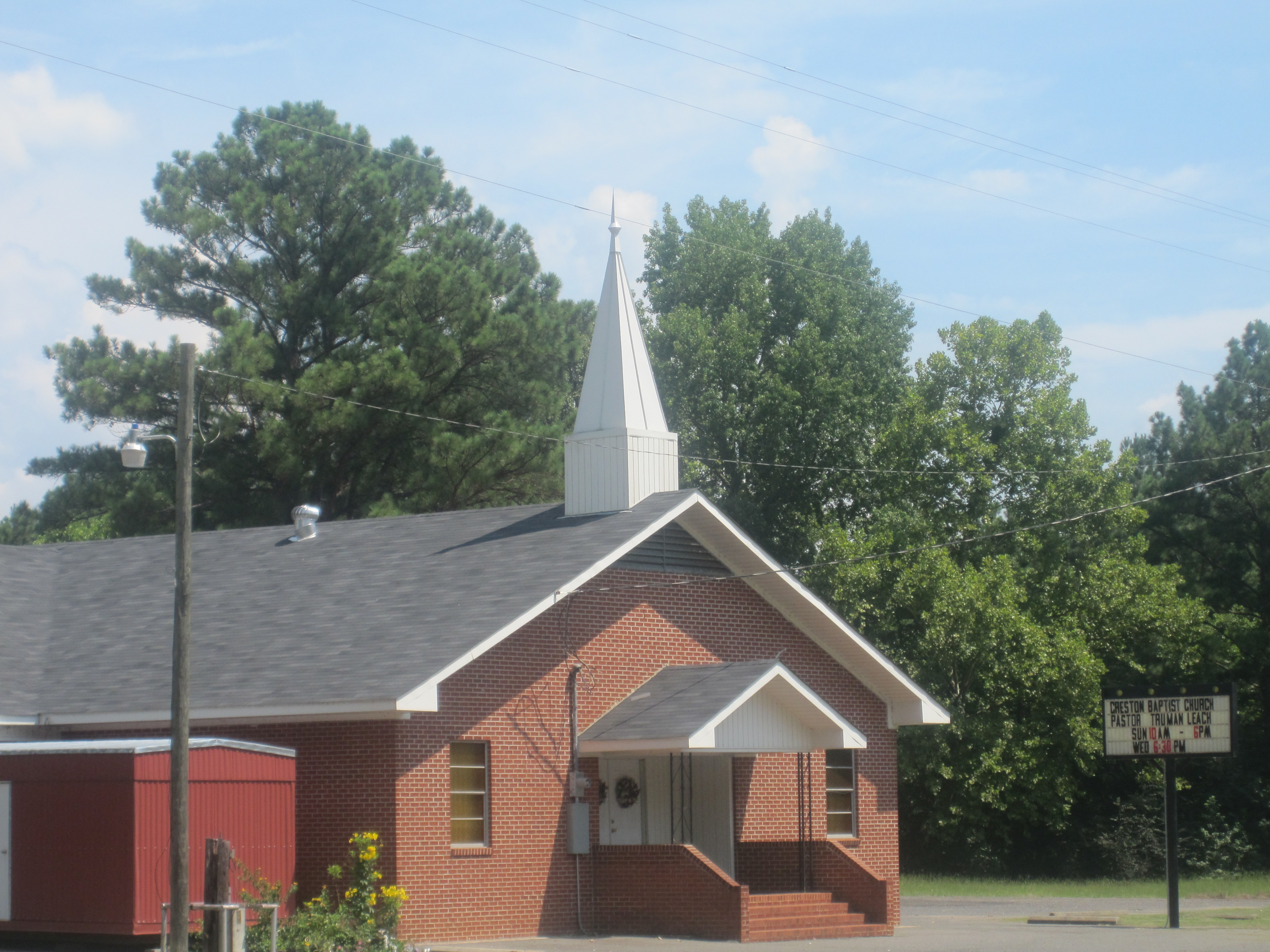
Creston Baptist Church; pastor Truman Leach (2013)

Creston is an unincorporated community in Natchitoches Parish, Louisiana, United States. Creston is not included in the 2010 United States census. The community is part of the Natchitoches Micropolitan Statistical Area.

== History ==
In 1912, Black patrons of a lodging site in Creston received notices that read, "Nigger, read and run, and if you can't read, run anyway." When the campers remained at the site, "a party of men rode into the camp and fired into their cabins. No one was hurt, but the black men were thoroughly demoralized."

== Business and community ==
Creston is a fishing community on Black Lake, a large waterway full of cypress trees. There is moss on many area trees. A new concrete bridge carries traffic on Louisiana State Highway 9 over the lake. The previous wooden bridge was dismantled.

Area businesses include Bell's Camp, established in 1936, and the Sea and Sirloin Restaurant, which opened in 1983.

Creston Baptist Church is located at the intersections of the state highways leading to Ashland, Goldonna, and Readhimer.

Among the pioneer families in Creston are Perot, Trichel, Pardee, Dortlon, and Desadier. They trace their origins to the 1720s with the marriage in Mobile, Alabama, of a Chitimacha Indian slave, Marie Theresa De La Grande Terre, originally from Lafourche Parish in south Louisiana, and a French military officer, Jacques Guedon.
