= Fort Johnson North, Louisiana =

Fort Johnson North
- Census-designated place
- Location in Vernon Parish and the state of Louisiana.
- Coordinates: 31°06′13″N 93°10′07″W
- Country: United States
- State: Louisiana
- Parish: Vernon

Area
  - Total: 8.39 sq mi (21.72 km^{2})
  - Land: 8.38 sq mi (21.70 km^{2})
  - Water: 0.0039 sq mi (0.01 km^{2})
- Elevation: 354 ft (108 m)

Population (2020)
  - Total: 2,179
  - Density: 260/sq mi (100.4/km^{2})
- Time zone: UTC-6 (CST)
  - Summer (DST): UTC-5 (CDT)
- Area code: 337
- FIPS code: 22-26746

Fort Johnson North is a census-designated place (CDP) in Vernon Parish, Louisiana, United States. The population was 3,279 at the 2000 census. It is part of the Fort Johnson South Micropolitan Statistical Area.

== Geography ==
Fort Johnson North is located at 31°6′13″N 93°10′7″W (31.103611, -93.168617).

According to the United States Census Bureau, the CDP has a total area of 8.1 square miles (21 km^{2}), all land.

== Demographics ==
Historical population
Census	Pop.	Note	%±
1980	1,644		—
1990	3,819		132.3%
2000	3,279		−14.1%
2010	2,864		−12.7%
2020	2,179		−23.9%
U.S. Decennial Census; 1950 1960 1970 1980; 1990 2000 2010

Fort Johnson North first appeared as a census designated place the 1980 U.S. Census under the name Fort Polk North.

=== Racial and ethnic composition ===
Fort Johnson North CDP, Louisiana – Racial and ethnic composition Note: the US Census treats Hispanic/Latino as an ethnic category. This table excludes Latinos from the racial categories and assigns them to a separate category. Hispanics/Latinos may be of any race.
Race / Ethnicity (NH = Non-Hispanic)	Pop 2000	Pop 2010	Pop 2020	% 2000	% 2010	% 2020
White alone (NH)	1,922	1,909	1,219	58.62%	66.66%	55.94%
Black or African American alone (NH)	691	310	270	21.07%	10.82%	12.39%
Native American or Alaska Native alone (NH)	31	31	14	0.95%	1.08%	0.64%
Asian alone (NH)	61	60	37	1.86%	2.09%	1.70%
Native Hawaiian or Pacific Islander alone (NH)	16	25	13	0.49%	0.87%	0.60%
Other race alone (NH)	10	8	2	0.30%	0.28%	0.09%
Mixed race or Multiracial (NH)	159	91	138	4.85%	3.18%	6.33%
Hispanic or Latino (any race)	389	430	486	11.86%	15.01%	22.30%
Total	3,279	2,864	2,179	100.00%	100.00%	100.00%

=== 2020 census ===
As of the census of 2000, there were 3,279 people, 1,076 households, and 1,039 families residing in the CDP. The population density was 403.7 inhabitants per square mile (155.9/km^{2}). There were 1,126 housing units at an average density of 138.6 per square mile (53.5/km^{2}). The racial makeup of the CDP was 62.9% White, 21.3% African American, 1.3% Native American, 2.1% Asian, 0.6% Pacific Islander, 5.1% from other races, and 6.7% from two or more races. Hispanic or Latino of any race were 11.9% of the population.

There were 1,076 households, out of which 67.8% had children under the age of 18 living with them, 91.5% were married couples living together, 4.0% had a female householder with no husband present, and 3.4% were non-families. 3.2% of all households were made up of individuals, and none had someone living alone who was 65 years of age or older. The average household size was 3.05 and the average family size was 3.10.

In the CDP, the population was spread out, with 36.2% under the age of 18, 20.8% from 18 to 24, 42.2% from 25 to 44, 0.7% from 45 to 64, and 0.1% who were 65 years of age or older. The median age was 23 years. For every 100 females, there were 101.3 males. For every 100 females age 18 and over, there were 99.2 males.

The median income for a household in the CDP was $31,921, and the median income for a family was $32,037. Males had a median income of $25,729 versus $19,044 for females. The per capita income for the CDP was $11,425. About 8.7% of families and 10.2% of the population were below the poverty line, including 11.7% of those under age 18 and none of those age 65 or over.
