= Lake Claiborne =

Lake in Louisiana, United States

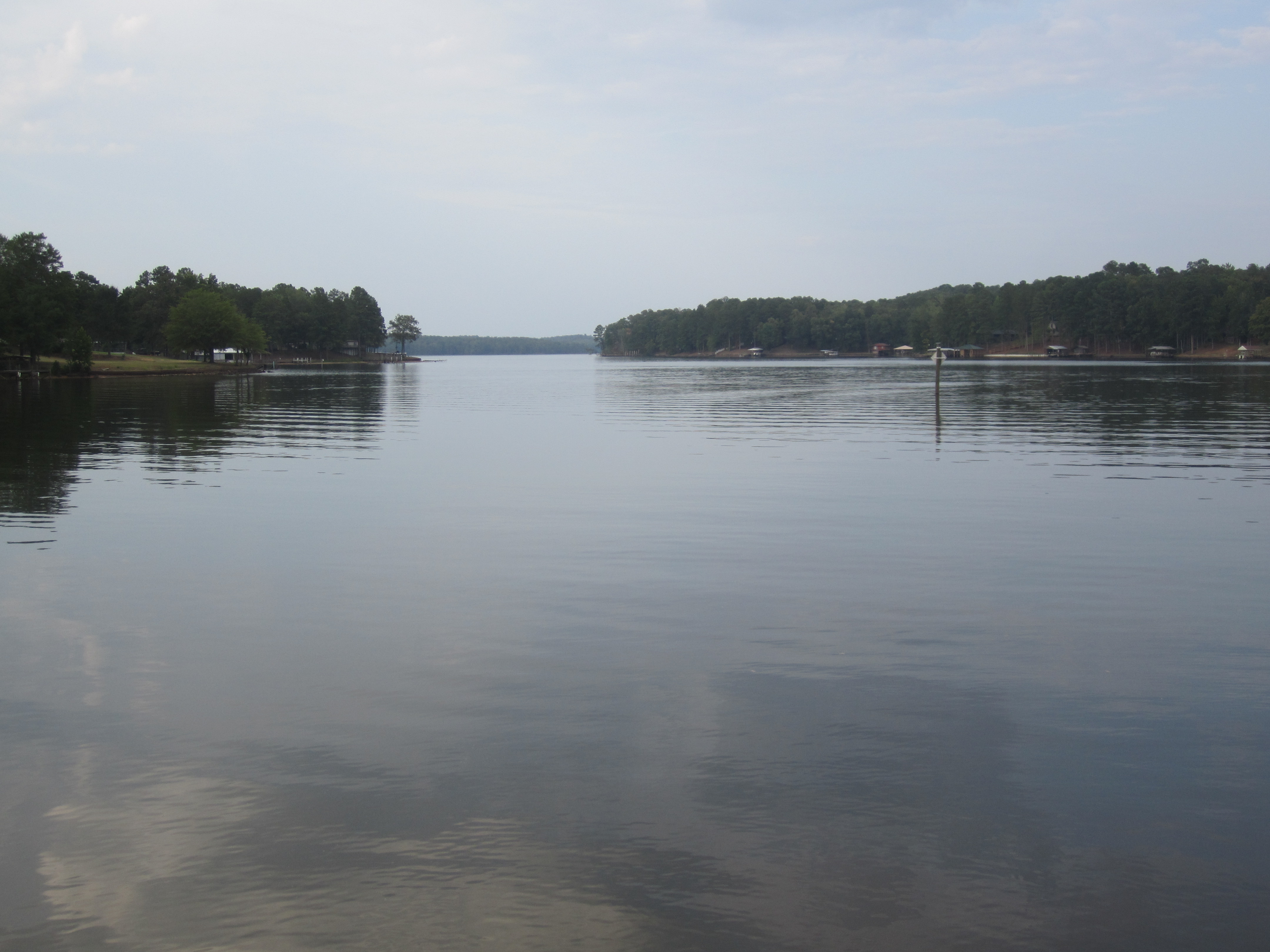
- Lake Claiborne east of Homer, Louisiana

- Map of Louisiana, United States of America
- Location: Claiborne Parish, Louisiana, United States of America
- Coordinates: 32.7231°N 92.9203°W
- Basin countries: United States
- Surface area: 6,400 acres (26 km^{2})
- Water volume: 99,500 acre⋅ft (0.1227 km^{3})
- Surface elevation: 185.0 ft (56.4 m) MSL

Lake Claiborne is a reservoir located near the town of Homer, Louisiana, United States. Isolated in a rural area, it is a popular man-made fishing area that has a combined estimated area of 6,400 acres (26 km^{2}). Lake Claiborne State Park, a Louisiana state maintained camping and recreation area, lies on southern shore of the lake. The state park also offers two world class disc golf courses.

The lake was created by the construction of Clairborne Lock and Dam by the United States Army Corps of Engineers in 1970. The lock is for water management and navigation; no hydroelectric power is produced here. The dam was built during the terms of Governors Jimmie Davis and John McKeithen.

An 8-year-old girl in Louisiana died after being infected by an extremely rare brain-eating amoeba (Naegleria fowleri) that is found in warm freshwater such as Lake Claiborne. The Louisiana Department of Health said the infection was "likely contracted while swimming in Lake Claiborne in north Louisiana".
