= Dixie, Louisiana =

Unincorporated community in Louisiana, U.S.

Coordinates: 32.693°N 93.835°W

Dixie is an unincorporated community in Caddo Parish, Louisiana, United States. It is part of the Shreveport–Bossier City Metropolitan Statistical Area.

The late Ansel M. Stroud, Jr., the adjutant general of the Louisiana National Guard from 1980 to 1997, was reared in Dixie. His father owned one of two general stores in the town sometime during the 1940s-1960s.

Dixie was founded sometime in the 1890s by the Dickson family, who built a large antebellum style home in the center of town.
