= Bryceland, Louisiana =

- Village
- Location of Bryceland in Bienville Parish, Louisiana.

- Location of Louisiana in the United States
- Coordinates: 32°26′38″N 92°59′23″W
- Country: United States
- State: Louisiana
- Parish: Bienville

Area
  - Total: 2.34 sq mi (6.06 km^{2})
  - Land: 2.33 sq mi (6.04 km^{2})
  - Water: 0.0077 sq mi (0.02 km^{2})
- Elevation: 312 ft (95 m)

Population (2020)
  - Total: 87
  - Density: 37/sq mi (14.4/km^{2})
- Time zone: UTC-6 (CST)
  - Summer (DST): UTC-5 (CDT)
- Area code: 318
- FIPS code: 22-10705
- GNIS feature ID: 2407424
- Website: bryceland.org

Bryceland is a village in Bienville Parish, Louisiana, United States. As of the 2020 census, Bryceland had a population of 87.

== Geography ==
According to the United States Census Bureau, the village has a total area of 2.3 square miles (6.0 km^{2}), of which 2.3 square miles (6.0 km^{2}) is land and 0.28% is water.

== Demographics ==
Historical population
Census	Pop.	Note	%±
1920	243		—
1930	176		−27.6%
1940	139		−21.0%
1950	123		−11.5%
1960	89		−27.6%
1970	65		−27.0%
1980	122		87.7%
1990	103		−15.6%
2000	114		10.7%
2010	108		−5.3%
2020	87		−19.4%
2025 (est.)	86	▼	−1.1%
U.S. Decennial Census

As of the census of 2000, there were 114 people, 48 households, and 30 families residing in the village. The population density was 48.8 inhabitants per square mile (18.8/km^{2}). There were 58 housing units at an average density of 24.9 per square mile (9.6/km^{2}). The racial makeup of the village was 82.46% White and 17.54% African American.

There were 48 households, out of which 29.2% had children under the age of 18 living with them, 50.0% were married couples living together, 6.3% had a female householder with no husband present, and 37.5% were non-families. 27.1% of all households were made up of individuals, and 16.7% had someone living alone who was 65 years of age or older. The average household size was 2.38 and the average family size was 2.93.

In the village, the population was spread out, with 22.8% under the age of 18, 10.5% from 18 to 24, 23.7% from 25 to 44, 24.6% from 45 to 64, and 18.4% who were 65 years of age or older. The median age was 38 years. For every 100 females, there were 100.0 males. For every 100 females age 18 and over, there were 104.7 males.

The median income for a household in the village was $26,750, and the median income for a family was $33,750. Males had a median income of $30,313 versus $27,500 for females. The per capita income for the village was $14,478. There were no families and 6.3% of the population living below the poverty line, including no under eighteens and 13.0% of those over 64.
