= Holly Ridge, Louisiana =

Unincorporated community in Louisiana

- Unincorporated community
- Location within Louisiana Location within the United States
- Coordinates: 32°28′04″N 91°37′36″W
- Country: United States
- State: Louisiana
- Parish: Richland
- Elevation: 52 ft (16 m)
- Time zone: UTC-6 (Central (CST))
  - Summer (DST): UTC-5 (CDT)
- Area code: 318
- GNIS feature ID: 543304
- FIPS code: 22-35415

Holly Ridge is an unincorporated community in Richland Parish, Louisiana, United States. It has a population of less than 2,000.

== History ==
In 1908 the Chess and Wymond company purchased over 6000 acres in the area now known as Holly Ridge. They named the site after the thousands of holly trees growing along the hilltops.

In December 2024, Meta Platforms broke ground in Holly Ridge on a $27-billion data center known as "Hyperion", projected to be the largest data center in the world once completed, with construction estimated to last through 2030. Vehicle crashes on roads near the Hyperion construction site increased by more than 600 percent in 2025 as compared to 2024.
