= Hico, Louisiana =

- Unincorporated community
- Location within Louisiana Location within the United States
- Coordinates: 32°44′42″N 92°42′50″W
- Country: United States
- State: Louisiana
- Parish: Lincoln
- Elevation: 249 ft (76 m)
- Time zone: UTC-6 (Central (CST))
  - Summer (DST): UTC-5 (CDT)
- Area code: 318
- GNIS feature ID: 535659

Hico is an unincorporated community in Lincoln Parish, Louisiana, United States.

The community sits at the intersection of routes 152 and 545 and is approximately five miles northwest of Dubach along route 152.

== Notable people ==
- Willis Reed, an American professional basketball player, coach, and general manager with the New York Knicks
