= Chestnut, Louisiana =

- Unincorporated community
- Hamlet of Chestnut
- Location within Louisiana Location within the United States
- Coordinates: 32°03′25″N 93°00′59″W
- Country: United States
- State: Louisiana
- Parish: Natchitoches
- Time zone: UTC-6 (CST)
  - Summer (DST): UTC-5 (CDT)
- Area code: 318

Chestnut is an unincorporated community in Natchitoches Parish, Louisiana, United States.

== Notable person ==
- Roy Sanders, educator who served in the Louisiana House of Representatives from 1948 to 1952
