= Lucky, Louisiana =

- Village
- Location of Lucky in Bienville Parish, Louisiana.

- Location of Louisiana in the United States
- Coordinates: 32°15′02″N 93°01′03″W
- Country: United States
- State: Louisiana
- Parish: Bienville

Area
  - Total: 8.19 sq mi (21.21 km^{2})
  - Land: 8.17 sq mi (21.16 km^{2})
  - Water: 0.019 sq mi (0.05 km^{2})
- Elevation: 236 ft (72 m)

Population (2020)
  - Total: 251
  - Density: 30.7/sq mi (11.86/km^{2})
- Time zone: UTC-6 (CST)
  - Summer (DST): UTC-5 (CDT)
- Area code: 318
- FIPS code: 22-46370
- GNIS feature ID: 2407494

Lucky is a village in Bienville Parish, Louisiana, United States. As of the 2020 census, Lucky had a population of 251.

== Geography ==
According to the United States Census Bureau, the village has a total area of 8.2 square miles (21 km^{2}), of which 8.2 square miles (21 km^{2}) is land and 0.24% is water.

== Demographics ==
Historical population
Census	Pop.	Note	%±
1980	370		—
1990	342		−7.6%
2000	355		3.8%
2010	272		−23.4%
2020	251		−7.7%
2025 (est.)	239	▼	−4.8%
U.S. Decennial Census

=== 2020 census ===
Lucky village, Louisiana – Racial and ethnic composition Note: the US Census treats Hispanic/Latino as an ethnic category. This table excludes Latinos from the racial categories and assigns them to a separate category. Hispanics/Latinos may be of any race.
Race / Ethnicity (NH = Non-Hispanic)	Pop 2000	Pop 2010	Pop 2020	% 2000	% 2010	% 2020
White alone (NH)	103	89	101	29.01%	32.72%	40.24%
Black or African American alone (NH)	246	181	138	69.30%	66.54%	54.98%
Native American or Alaska Native alone (NH)	0	0	0	0.00%	0.00%	0.00%
Asian alone (NH)	1	1	0	0.28%	0.37%	0.00%
Native Hawaiian or Pacific Islander alone (NH)	0	0	0	0.00%	0.00%	0.00%
Other race alone (NH)	0	0	0	0.00%	0.00%	0.00%
Mixed race or Multiracial (NH)	0	1	11	0.00%	0.37%	4.38%
Hispanic or Latino (any race)	5	0	1	1.41%	0.00%	0.40%
Total	355	272	251	100.00%	100.00%	100.00%

=== 2000 census ===
As of the census of 2000, there were 355 people, 123 households, and 83 families residing in the village. The population density was 43.3 inhabitants per square mile (16.7/km^{2}). There were 151 housing units at an average density of 18.4 per square mile (7.1/km^{2}). The racial makeup of the village was 30.14% White, 69.30% African American, 0.28% Asian, and 0.28% from two or more races. Hispanic or Latino of any race were 1.41% of the population.

There were 123 households, out of which 39.0% had children under the age of 18 living with them, 38.2% were married couples living together, 26.0% had a female householder with no husband present, and 32.5% were non-families. 30.1% of all households were made up of individuals, and 10.6% had someone living alone who was 65 years of age or older. The average household size was 2.89 and the average family size was 3.63.

In the village, the population was spread out, with 36.1% under the age of 18, 9.3% from 18 to 24, 25.4% from 25 to 44, 16.9% from 45 to 64, and 12.4% who were 65 years of age or older. The median age was 30 years. For every 100 females, there were 91.9 males. For every 100 females age 18 and over, there were 86.1 males.

The median income for a household in the village was $15,625, and the median income for a family was $17,500. Males had a median income of $27,212 versus $13,594 for females. The per capita income for the village was $7,058. About 40.5% of families and 51.2% of the population were below the poverty line, including 68.6% of those under age 18 and 34.2% of those age 65 or over.

== Notable person ==
- Joslyn Pennywell, model and contestant on America's Next Top Model. Former Ebony Fashion Fair Model and Miss US 2006–07.
