= Lake Claiborne State Park =

State park in Louisiana, United States

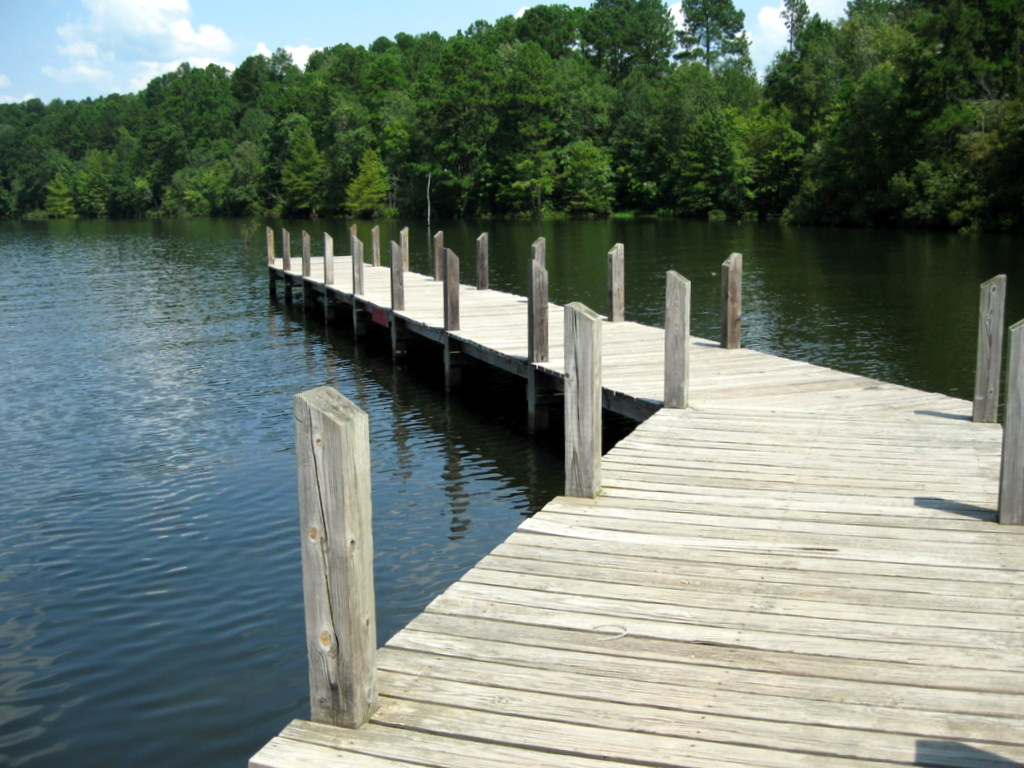
- Boardwalk into Lake Claiborne on the park grounds

- Location within Louisiana
- Location: Claiborne Parish, Louisiana, United States of America
- Coordinates: 32°43′23″N 92°55′13″W
- Area: 643 acres (2.60 km^{2}; 1.005 sq mi)
- Established: May 12, 1974
- Visitors: 55000
- Governing body: Louisiana Office of State Parks
- Website: web.archive.org/web/20110110221013/http://www.crt.state.la.us/parks/iClaiborn.aspx

Lake Claiborne State Park is a recreation site located in Claiborne Parish, northwestern Louisiana, USA. It was opened in 1974 and is 643 acres (2.60 km^{2}) in size. The park provides access to scenic Lake Claiborne, a 6,400-acre (26 km^{2}) man-made water body formed by damming Bayou D'Arbonne. Guests may stay at 10 cabins and 89 campsites (67 improved, 20 premium, 2 unimproved) on the Park grounds. Boats and canoes are available to rent. There is a large swimming beach, boat launch, Nature Center and numerous interpretive programs. The entrance to Lake Claiborne State Park is located 7 miles (11 km) southeast of Homer on Louisiana Highway 146.

The park was designed by the late architect Hugh G. Parker, Jr., of Bastrop, Louisiana.
