= Junction City, Louisiana =

- Village
- Village of Junction City
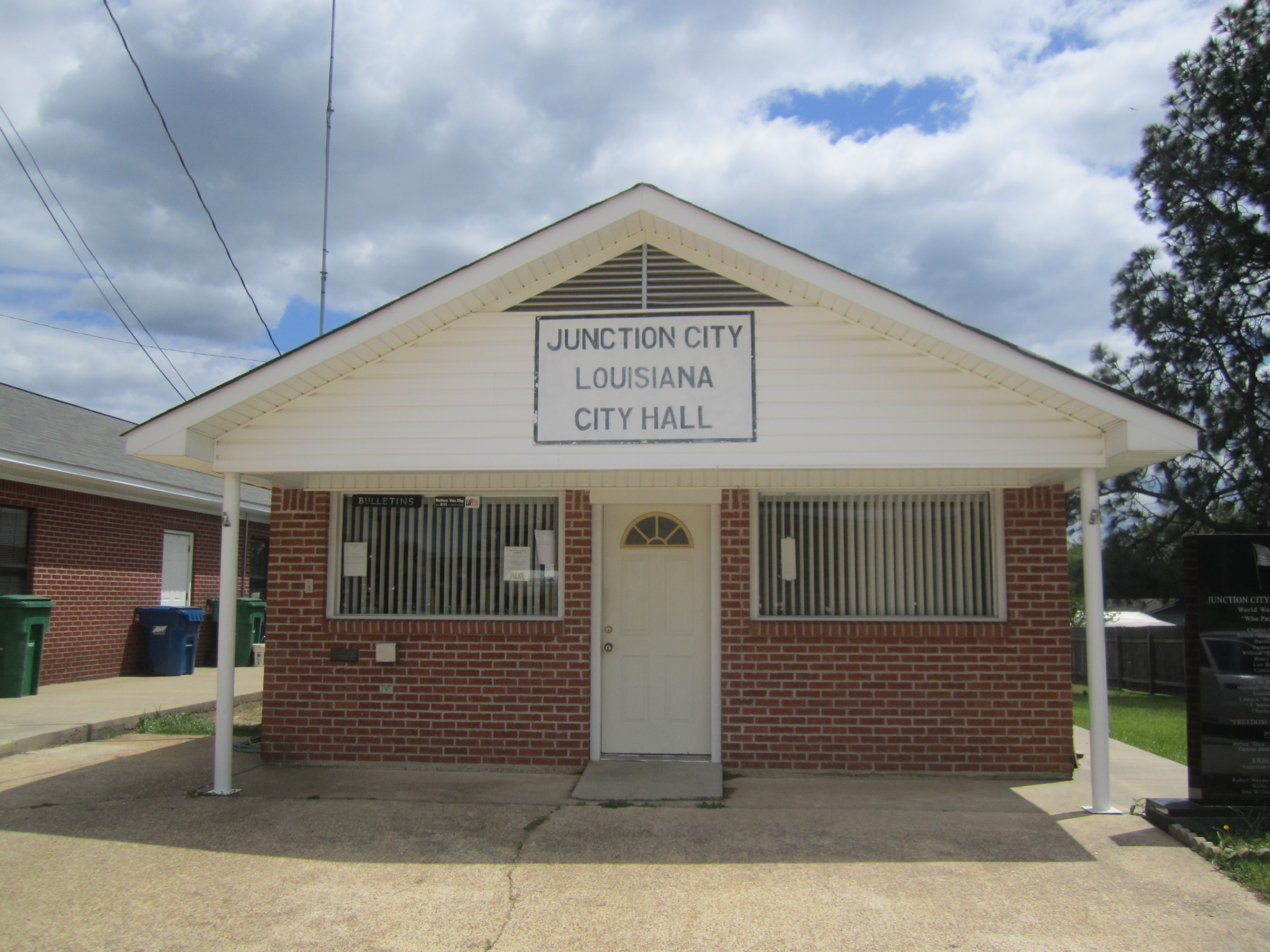
- City Hall in Junction City
- Nickname: 5th Will
- Location of Junction City in Union Parish, Louisiana.

- Location of Louisiana in the United States
- Coordinates: 33°00′26″N 92°43′21″W
- Country: United States
- State: Louisiana
- Parishes: Claiborne, Union

Area
  - Total: 1.23 sq mi (3.18 km^{2})
  - Land: 1.23 sq mi (3.18 km^{2})
  - Water: 0 sq mi (0.00 km^{2})
- Elevation: 177 ft (54 m)

Population (2020)
  - Total: 437
  - Density: 355.4/sq mi (137.24/km^{2})
- Time zone: UTC-6 (CST)
  - Summer (DST): UTC-5 (CDT)
- Postal code: 71749
- Area code: 318
- FIPS code: 22-38985
- GNIS feature ID: 2407483

Junction City is a village in Claiborne and Union parishes in Louisiana, United States, and is the twin city of neighboring Junction City, Arkansas. The population was 437 in 2020.

The Union Parish portion of Junction City is part of the Monroe Metropolitan Statistical Area.

== Geography ==
According to the United States Census Bureau, the village has a total area of 1.2 square miles (3.2 km^{2}), all land.

== Demographics ==
Historical population
Census	Pop.	Note	%±
1900	389		—
1910	396		1.8%
1920	322		−18.7%
1930	388		20.5%
1940	355		−8.5%
1950	514		44.8%
1960	639		24.3%
1970	733		14.7%
1980	727		−0.8%
1990	749		3.0%
2000	652		−13.0%
2010	582		−10.7%
2020	437		−24.9%
2025 (est.)	412	▼	−5.7%
U.S. Decennial Census

Junction City racial composition as of 2020
Race	Number	Percentage
White (non-Hispanic)	210	48.05%
Black or African American (non-Hispanic)	201	46.0%
Native American	1	0.23%
Asian	1	0.23%
Other/Mixed	11	2.52%
Hispanic or Latino	13	2.97%

As of the 2020 United States census, there were 437 people, 251 households, and 158 families residing in the village.
