= Summerfield High School =

Summerfield High School may refer to:

- Summerfield High School (Louisiana) in Summerfield, Louisiana
- Summerfield High School (Michigan) in Petersburg, Michigan

== See also ==
- Summerfield School (disambiguation)
