= William M. Rainach =

American politician (1913–1978)

William Monroe Rainach Sr. (July 31, 1913 – January 26, 1978) was an American businessman and politician who supported racial segregation. A Democrat, he was a member of the Louisiana House of Representatives and the State Senate.

== Early life ==
Rainach was born William Odom in Kentwood, Louisiana. His mother died of influenza in 1917, and his father placed him in an orphanage. He was adopted by Mr. and Mrs. Albert M. Rainach of Summerfield in Claiborne Parish, Louisiana. In 1924, he was struck in the eye by a baseball, which eventually cost him his sight in that eye.

After attending Southern State College, Strayer’s Business College, and Louisiana State University, he founded the Claiborne Electric Cooperative in 1939, which brought power to rural northwestern Louisiana. In 1945, he also established the Claiborne Butane Company. His business success enabled him to enter politics.

== Political career ==
Rainach was elected to the House of Representatives in 1940 and continued in office until 1948 when he was elected to the first of three terms in the Louisiana Senate. He served in the state senate from 1948 to 1960, after being succeeded by James T. McCalman. He advocated disenfranchising African American voters. Days after the Supreme Court determined in Brown v. Board of Education (1954) that laws establishing racial segregation in public schools was unconstitutional, the Louisiana Joint Legislative Committee was formed to fight against the decision. Senator Rainach was its first chairman, serving for six years and being one of the leaders of its efforts. He was also the head of the Louisiana Association of White Citizens Councils.

He was a candidate for governor as a segregationist in 1959, placing third, with 17% of the vote.

== Later life ==
In 1969, he was one of the founders of the segregationist Claiborne Academy.

Rainach killed himself at the age of 64, shooting himself with a pistol at his farm on January 26, 1978.

== See also ==
- Willie Rainach and the defense of segregation in Louisiana, 1954-1959, a doctoral thesis (preview)
