= Summerfield School =

Summerfield School (or similar spellings) could mean:

- Summerfield Schools public school district in Petersburg, Michigan, U.S.
- Summerfield High School in Summerfield, Louisiana, U.S.
- Summer Fields School in Summertown, Oxford, U.K.
- Summerfield School Gymnasium and Community Center, Summerfield, Guilford County, North Carolina, U.S.
- Summerfield School (Oklahoma)
- The former school Summerfields, St Leonards-on-Sea
