= Joe LeSage =

Former Louisiana politician

Joseph Carnahan LeSage Jr.

Member of the Louisiana Senate
- In office 1968–1972
- Constituency: Caddo Parish, Louisiana

Personal details
- Born: December 12, 1928 Homer, Louisiana, U.S.
- Died: September 22, 2015 (aged 86) Shreveport, Louisiana, U.S.
- Party: Democratic
- Education: Homer High School
- Occupation: Lawyer, Politician
- Known for: Supervisor of Louisiana State University

Military service
- Branch/service: United States Army
- Years of service: 1950–1953

Joseph Carnahan LeSage Jr. (December 12, 1928 - September 22, 2015) was a lawyer and politician in Louisiana. He worked in Shreveport and served in the Louisiana Senate representing Caddo Parish from 1968 until 1972. He was a supervisor of Louisiana State University.

He graduated from Homer High School in 1945. He was a multi-sport athlete. He served during the Korean War.

A Democrat, he was elected to the state senate in 1968. He served one term. Louisiana SCR45 commemorated his passing.

A video of an interview with him for an oral history project of the Shreveport Bar Association is on YouTube.
