= Karl Malone =

American basketball player (born 1963)

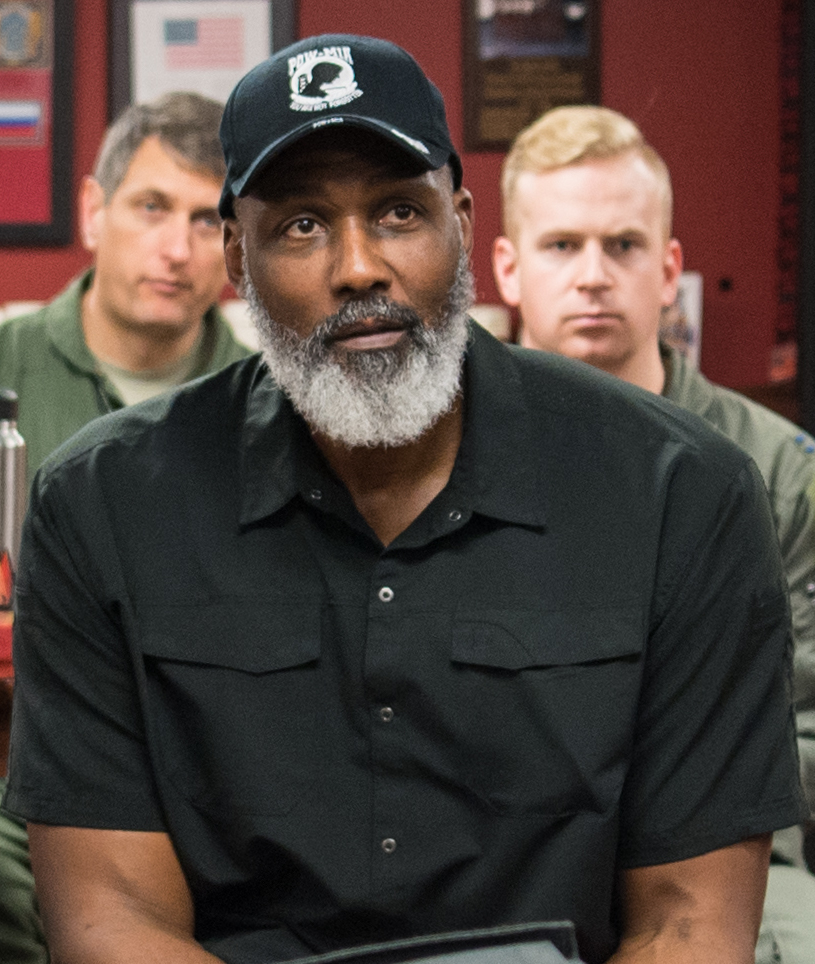
- Malone in 2020

Personal information
- Born: July 24, 1963 (age 63) Summerfield, Louisiana, U.S.
- Listed height: 6 ft 9 in (2.06 m)
- Listed weight: 259 lb (117 kg)

Career information
- High school: Summerfield (Summerfield, Louisiana)
- College: Louisiana Tech (1982–1985)
- NBA draft: 1985: 1st round, 13th overall pick
- Drafted by: Utah Jazz
- Playing career: 1985–2004
- Position: Power forward
- Number: 32, 11
- Coaching career: 2007–2011

Career history

Playing
- 1985–2003: Utah Jazz
- 2003–2004: Los Angeles Lakers

Coaching
- 2007–2011: Louisiana Tech (assistant)

Career highlights
- 2× NBA Most Valuable Player (1997, 1999); 14× NBA All-Star (1988–1998, 2000–2002); 2× NBA All-Star Game MVP (1989, 1993 (Note: co-MVP along with John Stockton)); 11× All-NBA First Team (1989–1999); 2× All-NBA Second Team (1988, 2000); All-NBA Third Team (2001); 3× NBA All-Defensive First Team (1997–1999); NBA All-Defensive Second Team (1988); NBA All-Rookie First Team (1986); NBA anniversary team (50th, 75th); No. 32 retired by Utah Jazz; Second-team All-American – NABC (1985); Southland Player of the Year (1983); 3× First-team All-Southland (1983–1985); No. 32 retired by Louisiana Tech Bulldogs

Career NBA statistics
- Points: 36,928 (25.0 ppg)
- Rebounds: 14,968 (10.1 rpg)
- Assists: 5,238 (3.6 apg)
- Stats at NBA.com
- Stats at Basketball Reference
- Basketball Hall of Fame
Medals
Men's basketball
Representing the United States
Olympic Games
Gold medal – first place	1992 Barcelona	National team
Gold medal – first place	1996 Atlanta	National team
FIBA Americas Championship
Gold medal – first place	1992 Portland	Men's basketball

Karl Anthony Malone (born July 24, 1963), nicknamed "the Mailman", is an American former professional basketball player who played in the National Basketball Association (NBA) for 18 seasons with the Utah Jazz, and in his last season, the Los Angeles Lakers. During his tenure with the Jazz, he formed a formidable duo with his teammate John Stockton and together they led the team to two NBA Finals appearances in 1997 and 1998, losing both times to the Chicago Bulls. Malone's 36,928 career points scored rank third all-time in NBA history and he holds the records for most free throws made and attempted, in addition to being tied for the second-most first-team All-NBA selections with Kobe Bryant (11), both behind LeBron James (13). Malone is often considered one of the greatest power forwards in NBA history, but his personal conduct has attracted criticism following revelations that, while attending college at Louisiana Tech, he impregnated a 13-year-old. No statutory rape charges were filed.

Malone played college basketball for the Louisiana Tech Bulldogs. In his three seasons, he helped the Bulldogs to their first NCAA tournament in 1984 and to first place in the Southland Conference in 1985. The Utah Jazz selected him in the first round of the 1985 NBA draft with the 13th overall pick. Malone appeared in the playoffs every season in his career, including the NBA Finals in 1997 and 1998 with the Jazz. He played his final season with the Los Angeles Lakers, with whom he played his third Finals in 2004. Malone also competed with the United States national team in the Summer Olympic Games of 1992 and 1996; in both years he won gold medals. In 1996, as part of the NBA's 50th Anniversary, Malone was honored as one of the 50 greatest players of all time by being named to the NBA 50th Anniversary Team. In October 2021, Malone was again honored as one of the league's greatest players of all time by being named to the NBA 75th Anniversary Team.

After retiring from the NBA, Malone joined the staff of the Louisiana Tech Bulldogs in 2007 and was inducted into the Naismith Memorial Basketball Hall of Fame in 2010 twice – for his individual career, and as a member of the 1992 United States men's Olympic basketball team.

== Early life ==
Born in Summerfield, Louisiana, Malone was the youngest of nine children and was raised on a farm by his single mother, Shirley. Shedrick Hay, his father, was married to a different woman and raising a family with her. Shedrick committed suicide when Karl was 14, though Malone didn't disclose the suicide until 1994. As a child, Malone often worked on the farm, chopped trees, hunted, and fished. He attended Summerfield High School and led his basketball team to three consecutive Louisiana Class C titles from 1979 to his senior season in 1981.

== College career ==
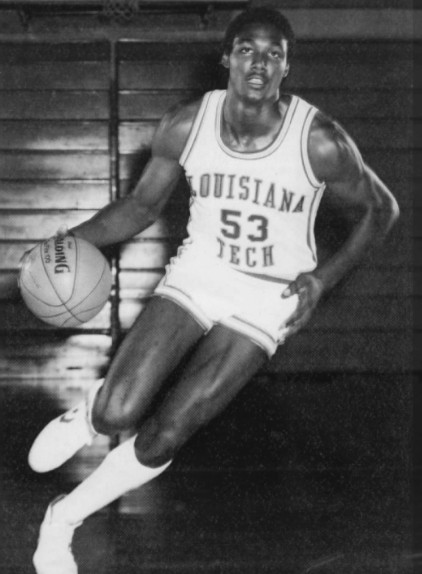
Malone with the Louisiana Tech Bulldogs in 1982

Malone was recruited by University of Arkansas basketball coach Eddie Sutton and Louisiana Tech basketball coach Andy Russo. Originally opting for Arkansas, Malone later weighed the option to sign with Louisiana Tech, which was closer to home. This was partially influenced by his close friend and teammate Benny Anders, who had also been recruited by Arkansas, signing with the University of Houston instead. Malone ultimately signed with Louisiana Tech in April 1981. However, he was ineligible to join the Louisiana Tech Bulldogs basketball team because his grades were too low for freshman eligibility. By the end of his freshman year, he had pushed his GPA up to 2.4, making him eligible for the basketball team the following year.

In his first season with Louisiana Tech (1982–83), Malone became the first person in the Southland Conference to be named Outstanding Player and Outstanding Newcomer in the same year. In 1983, he competed in that year's Summer Universiade along with fellow future NBA player Charles Barkley. In his second season (1983–84), Malone averaged 18.7 points and 9.3 rebounds per game. Louisiana Tech finished the 1984–85 season 29–3, at the top of the Southland Conference, and advanced to the NCAA tournament for the first time in school history; the team finished at the Sweet 16 round. In each of his three seasons with the Louisiana Tech Bulldogs, Malone was an All-Southland selection.

== Professional career ==
=== Utah Jazz (1985–2003) ===
==== Early years (1985–1987) ====
In the 1985 NBA draft, the Utah Jazz selected Karl Malone with the 13th overall pick. According to Malone's official NBA biography: "If professional scouts had correctly predicted the impact Karl Malone would have on the NBA, Malone would have been picked much higher than 13th in the 1985 NBA Draft." In fact, Malone was so convinced the Dallas Mavericks were going to select him with the eighth choice that he had already rented an apartment in Dallas. Instead, the Mavericks selected Detlef Schrempf. Under head coach Frank Layden, Malone averaged 14.9 points and 8.9 rebounds in his first season and made the 1986 NBA All-Rookie Team after coming in third for Rookie of the Year votes. On January 14, 1986, the Jazz beat the Houston Rockets 105–102 to snap the Rockets' 20-game winning streak at home. Malone scored 29 points in that game, including four free throws followed by a three-pointer by Pace Mannion to rally from a 96–89 deficit with 5 minutes and 36 seconds remaining to a 96–96 tie. For the third consecutive season, the Jazz made the postseason but lost the first round of the 1986 playoffs to the Dallas Mavericks. In the four playoff games, Malone improved in his scoring with a 20 points per game average but was still subpar in shooting (49.6% field goals) and rebounds (8.9). After his second season, Malone became the Jazz's leader in average scoring (21.7 points) and rebounding (10.4 rebounds); in 24 of 29 games between February 1 and April 3, 1987, he was the leading scorer of the game.

==== All-Star and team offense leader (1987–1996) ====
By the 1987–88 season, Malone was the foundation of the offense and John Stockton was the floor general. Malone made his first All-Star Game in 1988 on the strength of 27.1 points per game, and made his first All-NBA team at the end of the season. This was the first of 14 consecutive All-Star appearances for Malone. In the 1988 NBA All-Star Game, Malone led the Western Conference All-Star team with 22 points. The Jazz finished 47–35, third place in the Midwest Division, and defeated the Portland Trail Blazers in the first round. In the next round, the defending champions Los Angeles Lakers, led by perennial All-Stars Magic Johnson, James Worthy, and Kareem Abdul-Jabbar, defeated the Jazz in seven games. In the seventh game of the series, Malone scored 31 points and had 15 rebounds, but the Lakers beat the Jazz 109–98 and eventually won the 1988 NBA Finals. In 11 playoff games in 1988, Malone averaged 29.7 points and 11.8 rebounds.

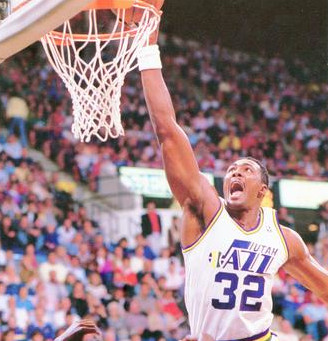
Malone circa 1988

Malone signed a 10-year contract during the 1988 offseason worth $18 million. In December 1988, Jerry Sloan succeeded Layden as head coach as Layden became team president. Malone averaged 29.1 points in 1988–89, good for second in the NBA behind Michael Jordan, and 10.7 rebounds, which was fifth in the league. This scoring average was Malone's highest so far in his career. At the 1989 NBA All-Star Game, Malone finished with 28 points, 9 rebounds and 3 assists en route to his first NBA All-Star MVP. The Jazz finished 51–31, but were swept in three games in the first round by the Golden State Warriors. This season marked Malone's first with the All-NBA First Team honor.

During the 1989–90, Malone increased his scoring to 31 points and his rebounding to 11.1 a game and again was selected to the All-NBA First Team. In the first game of the season, Malone recorded 40 points, 16 rebounds and 5 assists in a 122–113 win over the Denver Nuggets. On December 5, 1989, Malone scored 21 points and grabbed 19 rebounds in a 94–80 win over the home team, Cleveland Cavaliers. Seventeen days later, Malone recorded 52 points and 17 rebounds in a 114–100 road win over the Charlotte Hornets. On January 27, 1990, Malone scored a career-high 61 points in a 144–96 victory against the Milwaukee Bucks. He made 21 of 26 field goals and 19 of 23 free throws. It was the most points scored by a Jazz player since the team moved to Utah from New Orleans. Although Malone was voted to the NBA All-Star Game for the third consecutive season, because of an ankle injury he sat out the game. He led the team in scoring in 24 of the last 26 games of the season; on March 29, 1990, against the Golden State Warriors, Malone scored 49 points, and on April 12 against the Lakers he scored 45. The Jazz, finishing the season 55–27, lost to the Phoenix Suns within five games in the first round of the playoffs, in which Malone averaged 25.2 points and 10.2 rebounds. For the second straight season, Malone finished second in the league in points per game behind Michael Jordan.

From January 19 to March 4, 1991, Malone led the Jazz in scoring for 19 straight games; after starting the 1990–91 season 7–8 the team went 21–9 in January and February 1991. Malone scored 16 points and took 11 rebounds in the 1991 NBA All-Star Game, his fourth consecutive All-Star appearance for the West, and averaged 29.0 points and 11.8 rebounds each regular-season game. He was among four Jazz players with double-figure scoring averages, the others being the newly acquired Jeff Malone (no relation) as well as John Stockton and Thurl Bailey. In four games, the Jazz eliminated the Phoenix Suns in the first round of the 1991 playoffs but lost to the Portland Trail Blazers in the second round. Malone made the All-NBA First Team for the third consecutive season.

As he had done in 1989–90, Malone finished the 1991–92 season second in the league in scoring, averaging 28.0 points per game. He made the All-NBA First Team for the fourth straight year. It was also a breakout season for the Jazz; during the 1992 NBA Playoffs, the team made the Western Conference Finals for the first time in franchise history. Malone scored 40 or more points in five games this season. Despite his continued success and achievements, Malone encountered trouble for committing a flagrant foul. On December 14, 1991, when the Jazz played against the Detroit Pistons, Malone elbowed the Pistons' Isiah Thomas on the forehead. Thomas needed 40 stitches over his eye, and the NBA suspended Malone for the next game without pay and fined him $10,000. In its first-ever franchise Western Conference Finals appearance, in six games the Jazz lost in the playoffs for the second straight season to the Portland Trail Blazers. Malone averaged 29.1 points on 52.1% shooting and 11.9 rebounds in the 1992 playoffs.

Throughout the 1990s, Malone put up stellar numbers: in 1992–93, he averaged 27.0 points and 11.2 rebounds per game, 25.2 points and 11.5 rebounds in 1993–94, 26.7 points and 10.6 rebounds in 1994–95, and 25.7 points and 9.8 rebounds in 1995–96. Following the 1992 Summer Olympics in which Malone helped the American national team, dubbed the "Dream Team", win a gold medal, Malone expressed opposition to Magic Johnson, who had recently tested positive for HIV and retired from the NBA in 1991, making a comeback to the league. Malone's point of view diverged from the support for Johnson from his Olympic and Los Angeles Lakers teammates, and the NBA implemented AIDS-related precautions after Johnson's revelation. On February 4, 1993, in a game against the Lakers, Malone surpassed 16,000 career points. He and his teammate John Stockton shared the All-Star MVP award in 1993. In the West's 135–132 overtime win, Malone scored 28 points and pulled in 10 rebounds.

Malone started all 82 games of 1993–94 and helped the Jazz make the Western Conference Finals for the second time in franchise history and his career. In his ninth season, Malone led the Jazz in scoring (25.2), rebounding (11.5), and blocked shots (126), made 49.7% of field goal attempts, and played 3,329 minutes, the second-most that season in the league behind Latrell Sprewell's 3,533. On March 29, 1994, Malone recorded a career-high 23 rebounds, but the Jazz lost to the Golden State Warriors 116–113. However, Malone made only 8 of 29 field goals that night and commented post-game: "My rebounds are not going to be tomorrow's headline...Tomorrow's headline is going to be all those easy shots I missed." The eventual NBA champion Houston Rockets eliminated the Jazz from the Western Conference Finals in five games. Although Malone scored 32 points in the Jazz' 104–99 Game 2 loss, along with Stockton's 18, they and the Jazz were no match for the Rockets with high-scoring center Hakeem Olajuwon. Midway into the fourth quarter, Malone and Olajuwon scored on four consecutive possessions by their teams, leading up to a 93–93 tie.

For the first time in team history, in 1994–95, the Utah Jazz won 60 games. In addition, the team won 15 consecutive away games (the best such streak by the team, then the second-best streak in the league). Malone's 26.7 points per game ranked fourth in the NBA, and Malone became the 19th NBA player to reach 20,000 career points on January 20, 1995. In the 1995 playoffs, the Jazz lost to the Houston Rockets for the second consecutive year, this time in the first round. The Rockets became NBA champions for the second straight season.

On January 13, 1996, Malone renewed his contract with the Jazz. The Jazz only made it as far as the Western Conference Finals in this period, losing to the Portland Trail Blazers (1992), the Houston Rockets (1994) and the Seattle SuperSonics (1996).

==== Western Conference championship years (1996–1998) ====
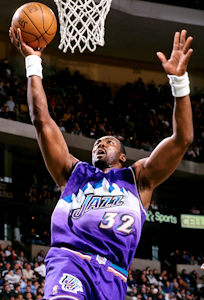
Malone in 1997

Malone returned from a gold medal winning-effort at the 1996 Summer Olympics leading the Jazz to two consecutive NBA Finals appearances. During the 1996–97 season, Malone put up a resurgent 27.4 points per game while leading the Jazz to a 64–18 record, the most regular-season wins in team history. Malone won his first NBA Most Valuable Player award, and the Jazz were the top team in the Western Conference and the playoff champions in that conference. After sweeping the Los Angeles Clippers and defeating the Los Angeles Lakers, the Jazz took on the Houston Rockets, led by the aging trio of Hakeem Olajuwon, Charles Barkley, and Clyde Drexler. The Jazz beat them in six games (the last victory coming on a last-second shot by Stockton). Malone finally reached the NBA Finals in 1997, where they played the Jordan-led Chicago Bulls. In a matchup of the two previous MVPs, the Bulls won the first two games at the United Center. Malone struggled from the field, going 6 of 20 for 20 points in Game 2. However, the Jazz won the next two games at the Delta Center behind Malone's 37 points in Game 3 and 23 in Game 4, including a game-winning fastbreak lay-up off a spectacular assist by Stockton in the last minute. The Bulls won the next two games and the series, with Malone struggling from the foul line in Game 6.

The next season saw the Jazz once again dominate. Malone put up 27 points per game and just missed out on his second MVP award, losing to Jordan. Nevertheless, the Jazz posted a 62–20 record, which was the best in the NBA. The Jazz once again were seated at the top of the Western Conference, and in the 1998 playoffs they defeated the Rockets, Spurs, and Lakers via a sweep en route to their second consecutive Finals appearance. The rematch with the Chicago Bulls would start differently, as Malone put up 21 points and the Jazz won Game 1, 88–85. Malone found himself unable to put up consistently high numbers, due in large part to the swarming defense of defenders Dennis Rodman and Scottie Pippen. In Game 5 of the 1998 Finals, Malone led the Jazz in scoring with 39 points, and the Jazz beat the Bulls 83–81 in Chicago. Malone scored his 39 points on 17-for-27 shooting and also made 9 rebounds, 5 assists, and 1 turnover. Many of his shots were "mid-range turnaround jumpers from the left side".

A sixth game of the Finals was held at the Delta Center in Salt Lake City, and by trailing the series 3–2 the team was one loss away from losing the series. Malone scored 31 points and made 11 rebounds. Although the Jazz held leads of 49–45 by halftime and 66–61 after the third quarter, the team squandered their lead in the fourth and would lose after Malone lost a pass in the post. With 18.9 seconds left in the fourth quarter and the Jazz leading 86–85, Bulls guard/forward Michael Jordan stole the ball just passed to Malone and with 5.2 seconds left made a jump shot that gave the Bulls an 87–86 lead. John Stockton missed a game-winning jump shot. Jordan's shot has been dubbed the "greatest shot" of his career, and the Bulls' 1998 title was their third consecutive championship and sixth since 1991.

==== Later seasons with Jazz (1998–2003) ====
On November 12, 1998, during the lockout that shortened the 1998–99 season, Malone declared on his Los Angeles-based radio show that he would demand a trade from the Jazz after the end of the lockout, citing a lack of respect from the team owner Larry H. Miller and the Utah media, which he dubbed "goons". A week later, Malone backed off on his trade demands, stating in an interview that he would still love to play for the Jazz with "everything else being equal". The NBA regular season resumed in February and Malone won his second MVP award, with the Jazz going 37–13 during the 50-game regular season. They lost in the second round that year to the Trail Blazers, and for the next several years the Jazz fell out of title contention. The Jazz won Game 5 of the second-round 1999 round against the Blazers 88–71 to force a sixth game, and Malone scored 23 points. In that game, Malone elbowed the Blazers' Brian Grant, something he also did in Game 1 and for which he was fined $10,000. Despite the decline of his team and his advancing age, Malone averaged 25.5, 23.2, 22.4, and 20.6 points per game in his last four seasons with Utah. He became a free agent in 2003, the year Stockton had retired. For the time Malone and Stockton played together on the Jazz (1985–2003), the two formed one of the most productive guard–forward combinations in NBA history. Playing coach Jerry Sloan's scrappy and tough style and perfecting the pick and roll to a maximum degree of efficiency, the Jazz regularly made the playoffs with a winning record. Malone led the Jazz to multiple 50-win seasons with the exception of 1992–93 (47–35).

=== Los Angeles Lakers (2003–2004) ===
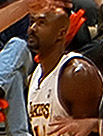
Malone with the Lakers

Malone played in the NBA for one more season, joining the Los Angeles Lakers in an attempt to win a championship. All-Star point guard Gary Payton also joined the Lakers in an attempt to win his first NBA championship, and with Malone, Payton, Shaquille O'Neal and Kobe Bryant, the Lakers were favorites to win the title. The No. 32 jersey Malone had worn for 19 years with the Jazz was already retired in honor of Magic Johnson, and while Johnson offered to allow Malone to wear the number, Malone ultimately declined, and instead wore a number 11 jersey. The Lakers rolled out to a dominant 18–3 start to the season, but on December 21, Malone suffered a knee injury against the Phoenix Suns that forced him to miss 39 games. Malone returned by the season's end, as the Lakers entered the playoffs with 56 wins and the number 2 seed in the playoffs. In the first round against the Houston Rockets, Malone posted double-figure scoring in 4 games, including a 30-point and 13-rebound effort in the Lakers' game 4 victory. The Lakers advanced to face the San Antonio Spurs in the conference semifinals, where Malone played a critical role on defense against Tim Duncan, despite not scoring more than 13 points in any game during the series. The Lakers defeated the Spurs in 6 games in the conference semifinals before defeating the Minnesota Timberwolves in 6 games in the conference finals to advance to the NBA Finals. He scored 17 points on two occasions against Minnesota and averaged 11.5 points and 8.8 rebounds a game in the playoffs.

The 40-year-old Malone's quest to win an NBA championship failed as the Lakers were defeated in five games by the Detroit Pistons in the 2004 NBA Finals. Malone sprained his right knee in game three and played injured in games three and four before missing the fifth and final game of the series.

=== Retirement ===
After his season with the Lakers, Malone became a free agent. He had knee surgery during the summer of 2004, and personal problems with Lakers guard Kobe Bryant, who prompted Malone not to return for another season with the team. The New York Knicks sought to sign Malone for 2004–05. In early February 2005, prior to the 2005 NBA All-Star Game, Malone's agent speculated that Malone would sign with the San Antonio Spurs. Spurs head coach Gregg Popovich confirmed his team was interested in signing Malone, should he decide to play one more season.

At a press conference on February 13, 2005, at the Delta Center, Malone officially announced his retirement from the NBA after 19 seasons.

The Utah Jazz retired Malone's jersey number 32 on March 23, 2006, when the Jazz hosted the Washington Wizards. He was also honored with the unveiling of a bronze statue outside the EnergySolutions Arena next to teammate John Stockton, and the renaming of a portion of 100 South in Salt Lake City in his honor. The location where the statues stand is now the intersection of Stockton and Malone.

== Olympic career ==
In 1984, Malone and Stockton were both cut from the United States men's national basketball team but joined the team in 1992, when national basketball teams welcomed NBA players. Prior to that only professionals from leagues other than the NBA were allowed to compete, and that greatly disadvantaged the United States.

The Oregon National Guard made Malone an honorary member after the U.S. national team beat the Venezuelan team 127–80 in the gold-medal game of the 1992 Olympic qualifier tournament.

Malone played in the 1992 and 1996 Summer Olympics and won gold medals with the US team both years. In the 1996 Olympics, Malone averaged 8.4 points, 4.5 rebounds, and 1.4 assists per game and made 56.9% of two-point field goal attempts and 52.9% of free-throw attempts. In 2010, he was inducted into Naismith Memorial Basketball Hall of Fame along with the rest of the original Dream Team.

== Coaching career ==
=== Louisiana Tech (2007–2011) ===
On May 31, 2007, Malone became director of basketball promotion and assistant strength and conditioning coach at his alma mater Louisiana Tech University and donated $350,000 to the university athletic department.

On May 29, 2013, Malone returned to the Utah Jazz to work as a big man coach.

== Player profile ==
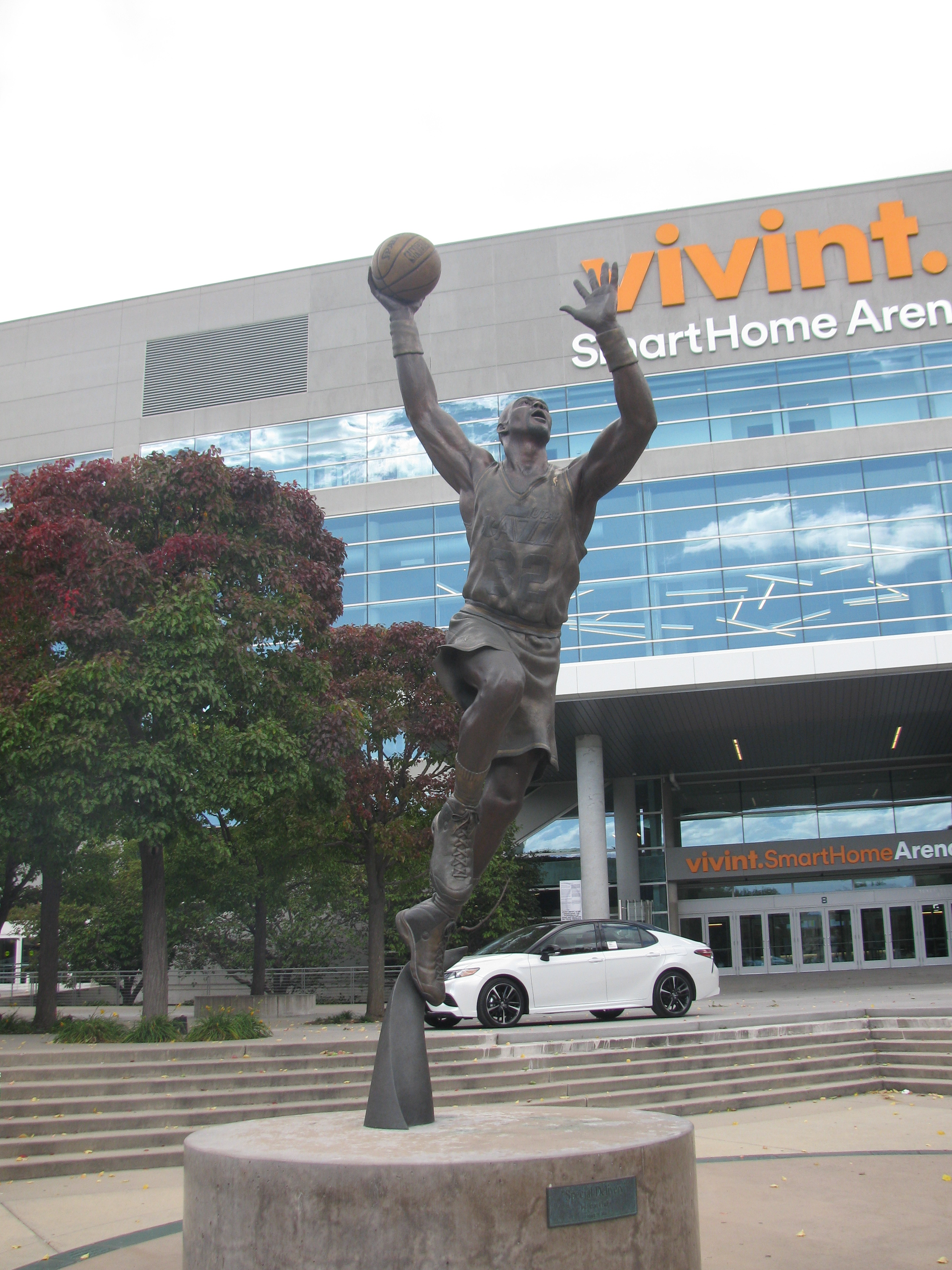
Malone's statue outside the Delta Center (then Vivint Smart Home Arena, pictured in 2017)

Malone is regarded as one of the best power forwards in the history of the NBA and was known as "the Mailman" for his consistent delivery. He collected two regular-season MVP Awards, eleven NBA First Team nominations and was also selected to the NBA All-Defensive First Team three times. In 2022, to commemorate the NBA's 75th Anniversary The Athletic ranked their top 75 players of all time, and named Malone as the 16th greatest player in NBA history.

Malone wore number 32 for the Utah Jazz. He wore number 11 for the Los Angeles Lakers (number 32 was retired honoring Magic Johnson, though Johnson himself offered to have it unretired for Malone to wear, an offer Malone declined), though he was photographed with a number 32 jersey at his Lakers introductory press conference. Malone also wore number 11 for the Dream Team, as the players wore 4 to 15 to adhere to FIBA rules.

Malone has also played 193 playoff games without winning an NBA championship, the most in playoff history.

== Awards and honors ==
NBA

- 2× NBA Most Valuable Player: 1997, 1999
- 14× NBA All-Star: 1988–1998, 2000–2002
- 2× NBA All-Star Game MVP: 1989, 1993
- 14x All-NBA Team selections:
  - 11× All-NBA First Team: 1989–1999
  - 2× All-NBA Second Team: 1988, 2000
  - All-NBA Third Team: 2001
- 4x NBA All-Defensive Team selections:
  - 3× NBA All-Defensive First Team: 1997–1999
  - NBA All-Defensive Second Team: 1988
- NBA All-Rookie First Team: 1986
- 50 Greatest Players in NBA History (1996)
- NBA 75th Anniversary Team (2021)
- No. 32 retired by Utah Jazz

USA Basketball

- Olympics gold medalist: 1992, 1996
- FIBA Americas Championship: 1992

== NBA career statistics ==
Legend
GP	Games played	GS	Games started	MPG	Minutes per game
FG%	Field goal percentage	3P%	3-point field goal percentage	FT%	Free throw percentage
RPG	Rebounds per game	APG	Assists per game	SPG	Steals per game
BPG	Blocks per game	PPG	Points per game	**Bold**	Career high
*	Led the league

=== Regular season ===
Year	Team	GP	GS	MPG	FG%	3P%	FT%	RPG	APG	SPG	BPG	PPG
1985–86	Utah	81	76	30.6	.496	.000	.481	8.9	2.9	1.3	0.5	14.9
1986–87	Utah	**82***	**82***	34.8	.512	.000	.598	10.4	1.9	1.3	0.7	21.7
1987–88	Utah	**82**	**82***	39.0	.520	.000	.700	**12.0**	2.4	1.4	0.6	27.7
1988–89	Utah	80	80	39.1	.519	.313	.766	10.7	2.7	1.8	0.9	29.1
1989–90	Utah	**82***	**82***	38.1	**.562**	.372	.762	11.1	2.8	1.5	0.6	**31.0**
1990–91	Utah	**82***	**82***	40.3	.527	.286	.770	11.8	3.3	1.1	1.0	29.0
1991–92	Utah	81	81	37.7	.526	.176	.778	11.2	3.0	1.3	0.6	28.0
1992–93	Utah	**82**	**82***	37.8	.552	.200	.740	11.2	3.8	1.5	1.0	27.0
1993–94	Utah	**82***	**82***	**40.6**	.497	.250	.694	11.5	4.0	1.5	**1.5**	25.2
1994–95	Utah	**82***	**82***	38.1	.536	.268	.742	10.6	3.5	1.6	1.0	26.7
1995–96	Utah	**82**	**82***	38.0	.519	**.400**	.723	9.8	4.2	1.7	0.7	25.7
1996–97	Utah	**82**	**82***	36.6	.550	.000	.755	9.9	4.5	1.4	0.6	27.4
1997–98	Utah	81	81	37.4	.530	.333	.761	10.3	3.9	1.2	0.9	27.0
1998–99	Utah	49	49	37.4	.493	.000	.788	9.4	4.1	1.3	0.6	23.8
1999–00	Utah	**82**	**82***	35.9	.509	.250	**.797**	9.5	3.7	1.0	0.9	25.5
2000–01	Utah	81	81	35.7	.498	**.400**	.793	8.3	4.5	1.1	0.8	23.2
2001–02	Utah	80	80	38.0	.454	.360	**.797**	8.6	4.3	**1.9**	0.7	22.4
2002–03	Utah	81	81	36.2	.462	.214	.763	7.8	**4.7**	1.7	0.4	20.6
2003–04	L.A. Lakers	42	42	32.7	.483	.000	.747	8.7	3.9	1.2	0.5	13.2
Career		1,476	1,471	37.2	.516	.274	.742	10.1	3.6	1.4	0.8	25.0
All-Star		12	8	20.3	.542	–	.725	6.2	1.6	1.0	0.4	12.1

=== Playoffs ===
Year	Team	GP	GS	MPG	FG%	3P%	FT%	RPG	APG	SPG	BPG	PPG
1986	Utah	4	4	36.0	**.528**	.000	.423	7.5	1.0	2.0	.0	21.8
1987	Utah	5	5	40.0	.420	.000	.722	9.6	1.2	**2.2**	.8	20.0
1988	Utah	11	11	44.9	.482	.000	.723	11.8	1.5	1.2	.6	29.7
1989	Utah	3	3	**45.3**	.500	.000	.813	**16.3**	1.3	1.0	.3	**30.7**
1990	Utah	5	5	40.6	.438	.000	.756	10.2	2.2	**2.2**	1.0	25.2
1991	Utah	9	9	42.6	.455	.000	**.846**	13.3	3.2	1.0	**1.2**	29.7
1992	Utah	16	16	43.0	.521	.000	.805	11.3	2.6	1.4	**1.2**	29.1
1993	Utah	5	5	43.2	.454	.500	.816	10.4	2.0	1.2	.4	24.0
1994	Utah	16	16	43.9	.467	.000	.738	12.4	3.4	1.4	.8	27.1
1995	Utah	5	5	43.2	.466	.333	.692	13.2	3.8	1.4	.4	30.2
1996	Utah	18	18	40.3	.469	.000	.574	10.3	4.4	1.9	.6	26.5
1997	Utah	20	20	40.8	.435	.500	.720	11.4	2.9	1.4	.8	26.0
1998	Utah	20	20	39.8	.471	.000	.788	10.9	3.4	1.1	1.0	26.3
1999	Utah	11	11	41.0	.417	.000	.791	11.3	**4.7**	1.2	.7	21.8
2000	Utah	10	10	38.6	.520	**1.000**	.810	8.9	3.1	.7	.7	27.2
2001	Utah	5	5	39.8	.405	.500	.796	8.8	3.4	1.0	.8	27.6
2002	Utah	4	4	40.8	.411	.000	.714	7.5	4.5	.8	.8	20.0
2003	Utah	5	5	38.2	.405	.000	.732	6.8	4.0	1.6	.4	19.6
2004	L.A. Lakers	**21**	**21**	38.0	.450	.000	.630	8.8	3.4	1.1	.1	11.5
Career		193	193	41.0	.463	.162	.736	10.7	3.2	1.3	.7	24.7

== Other ventures ==
=== Businesses ===
Malone is the owner of Teriyaki Grill, Eskamoe's Frozen Custard & More, and Arby's in Ruston, Louisiana.

He is also majority owner of Karl Malone Auto Group which includes four car dealerships in Utah (Chevrolet, Chrysler-Dodge-Jeep-Ram, Ford and Toyota), three in Arkansas (Chevrolet, Ford and Toyota), one in Louisiana (Toyota) and one in Idaho (Ford). The company also has powersports dealerships in each of those states. Malone previously co-owned a Toyota dealership in Albuquerque, New Mexico, with Larry H. Miller Dealerships, but sold his share in 2010. He also co-owned a Honda dealership in Sandy, Utah, with John Stockton, but sold his share, again to Larry H. Miller Dealerships, in 2010.

Malone also owns three Jiffy Lube franchises in Utah, and is a part owner of Burger King franchises in Utah and Idaho.

=== Acting ===
Malone starred in the 1994 film Rockwell as a member of Porter Rockwell's team. He had a guest appearance as himself and as a superhero named "Pulverizer" in the Static Shock episode "Hoop Squad". Malone also made a cameo appearance as himself in the 2004 comedy film Soul Plane and appears in an episode of Brother's Keeper from 1998. He also has a recurring role in a skit called "All Alone with Karl Malone" on the television series Jimmy Kimmel Live!.

=== Professional wrestling ===
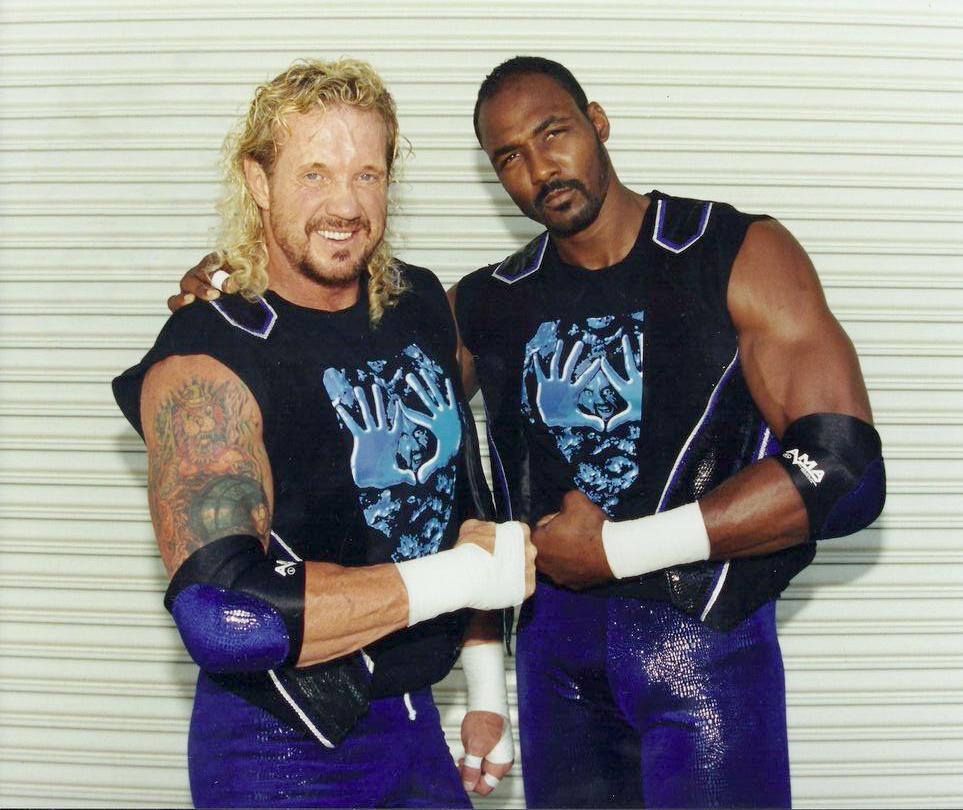
Malone with Diamond Dallas Page in 1998

After the 1998 NBA Finals, Malone and Chicago Bulls power forward Dennis Rodman participated in a professional wrestling match in World Championship Wrestling (WCW) at their Bash at the Beach event in July 1998. Malone, a wrestling fan, teamed with his friend, Diamond Dallas Page, against Rodman and Hulk Hogan. In a match that was largely panned by wrestling critics, the two power forwards exchanged "rudimentary headlocks, slams and clotheslines" for 23 minutes. Malone and DDP lost to Rodman and Hogan. The event was a massive financial success for the company, drawing the highest pay-per-view buyrate of 1998 and one of the highest in the company's history.

== Personal life ==
=== Family ===
Children of Karl Malone
- By Bonita Ford
  - Cheryl (born 1981)
  - Daryl (born 1981)
- By Gloria Bell
  - Demetress (born 1984)
- By Kay Kinsey
  - Kadee (born 1991)
  - Kylee (born 1993)
  - Karl, Jr. ("K.J."; born 1995)
  - Karlee (born 1998)

Malone married Kay Kinsey, winner of the 1988 Miss Idaho USA pageant, on December 24, 1990. They have four children: daughter Kadee (born November 8, 1991), daughter Kylee (born April 7, 1993), son Karl Jr. "K.J." (born May 8, 1995), and daughter Karlee (born 1998). K.J. played football at LSU, and was invited to the 2018 NFL Combine.

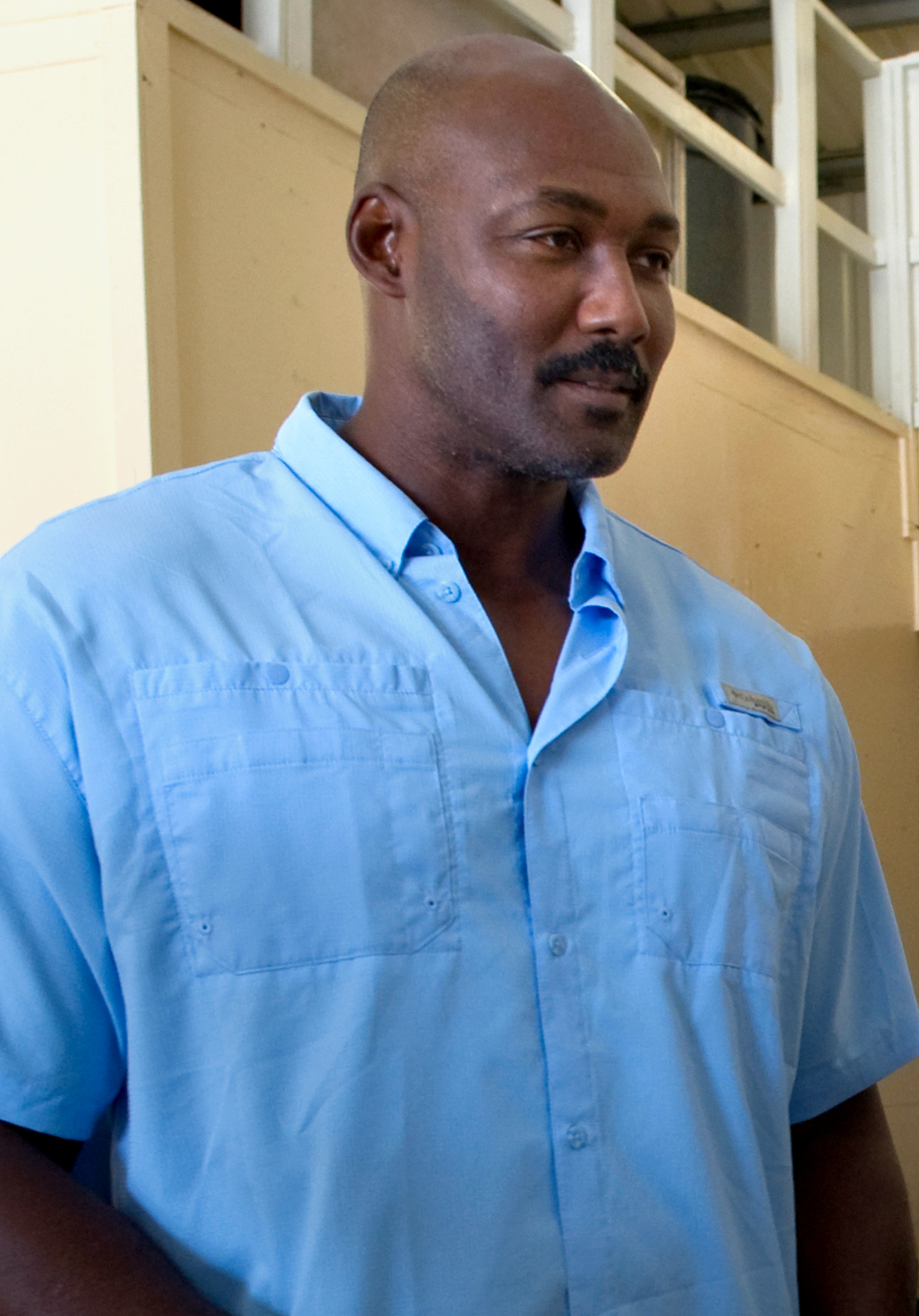
Malone in 2011

In 1998, the tabloid newspaper The Globe reported that Malone had been a defendant in paternity lawsuits, filed shortly after Malone began his professional basketball career in the late 1980s. The newspaper alleged that he was the father of three children: two by Bonita Ford, a woman approximately his age from his hometown of Summerfield, Louisiana, and one with Gloria Bell, who was 13 when she gave birth. Malone and Ford were both 17 when twins Daryl and Cheryl Ford were born; Malone was a 20-year-old college sophomore when Bell, at age 13, gave birth to Demetress Bell. Under Louisiana law at the time, a child under the age of 17 could not consent to sexual activities, but no statutory rape charges were filed against Malone. In the aftermath of the Globe story, Malone met the Ford twins for the first time since visiting them in the hospital after they were born. Malone did not meet with Bell at that time, and his attorney insisted that Malone had settled the lawsuits before any conclusive establishment of paternity and thus still did not know whether he was truly the father of any of the children.

The Tribune confirmed that the judge in the Bell lawsuit ruled Malone to be the father, not based on presented evidence, but rather because Malone did not respond to the suit. The paper also examined court documents detailing the evidence that was to have been presented had Malone responded and a trial ensued. One item listed was a laboratory blood test that concluded with over 99% certainty that Bell's father was either Malone or a brother of Malone. The paper also reported that applying the same blood sample to the Ford twins resulted in a similarly high probability of paternity by Malone. According to the Tribune, Malone challenged the court's ruling with regard to Bell, claiming that the judgment holding him responsible for $125 per week in child support, plus past and future medical expenses, was excessive. Before Malone's appeal was adjudicated, the lawsuit was settled on confidential terms. In the case of the Ford twins, Malone was ruled to be their father when he violated a court order by refusing to reveal his assets or submit to a DNA test. Thereafter, another out-of-court settlement was reached.

By the fall of 1998, Malone accepted his paternity of the Ford twins, and Kay Malone said publicly that the twins were members of the Malone family. Since that time, Karl Malone has maintained a relationship with the twins, each of whom later played college basketball at his alma mater, Louisiana Tech. Cheryl Ford went on to a 10 year professional basketball career with the Detroit Shock of the Women's National Basketball Association.

Bell has played as an NFL offensive lineman for the Buffalo Bills, Philadelphia Eagles, and Dallas Cowboys. In 2008, The Buffalo News reported that Bell's first meeting with Malone came shortly after Bell graduated from high school. According to Bell, Malone told him then that it was "too late" for them to have a father-son relationship. However, in 2014, the two repaired their relationship and were in regular contact by 2018.

In 2018, Malone said about his relationship with his older children, "I didn't handle it right; I was wrong. ... Father Time is the biggest thief that's out there, and you can't get that back."

=== Religion ===
In a 2013 interview, Malone identified as a Southern Baptist and his wife and children are Catholics. He is the godfather to the youngest son of John Stockton.

=== Politics ===
Malone donated $4,000 to the 2004 reelection campaign of President George W. Bush and $2,000 to the 2004 U.S. Senate campaign of Lisa Murkowski, a Republican from Alaska. In 2002, Malone donated $1,000 to the campaign of incumbent U.S. Representative Jim Matheson, a Democrat representing Utah's 2nd congressional district. Malone appeared on the "Great American Panel" segment of the Fox News talk show Hannity in March 2009. He advocated support for farmers in Louisiana who were about to lose their jobs due to the closing of Pilgrim's Pride plants.

Malone has served on the board of directors of the National Rifle Association of America (NRA), a national firearms advocacy organization.

=== Outdoor life ===
Malone is an avid hunter and fisherman. He owns a summer home near the Kenai River in Alaska. In July 1998, Malone joined his Jazz teammates Chris Morris and Bryon Russell, some family members, corporate leadership of Q-Lube, and winners of a Q-Lube contest for a four-day fishing trip to Alaska.

=== Public image ===
Malone is known for frequently referring to himself in the third person.

He has also appeared in television commercials for LA Gear sneakers, Starter, Morris Air Service, Upper Deck, and Burger King.

A cereal dedicated to him, MVP Flakes, was produced in 2000.

Vanessa Bryant has accused Malone of multiple incidents of sexual harassment.

== See also ==
- List of NBA career scoring leaders
- List of NBA franchise career scoring leaders
- List of NBA career rebounding leaders
- List of NBA career steals leaders
- List of NBA career turnovers leaders
- List of NBA career personal fouls leaders
- List of NBA career free throw scoring leaders
- List of NBA career games played leaders
- List of NBA career minutes played leaders
- List of NBA career playoff scoring leaders
- List of NBA career playoff rebounding leaders
- List of NBA career playoff steals leaders
- List of NBA career playoff turnovers leaders
- List of NBA career playoff free throw scoring leaders
- List of NBA career playoff games played leaders
- List of NBA single-game scoring leaders
- List of NBA single-game playoff scoring leaders
- List of NBA seasons played leaders
- List of oldest and youngest NBA players
