= Summerfield High School (Louisiana) =

High school in Louisiana, United States

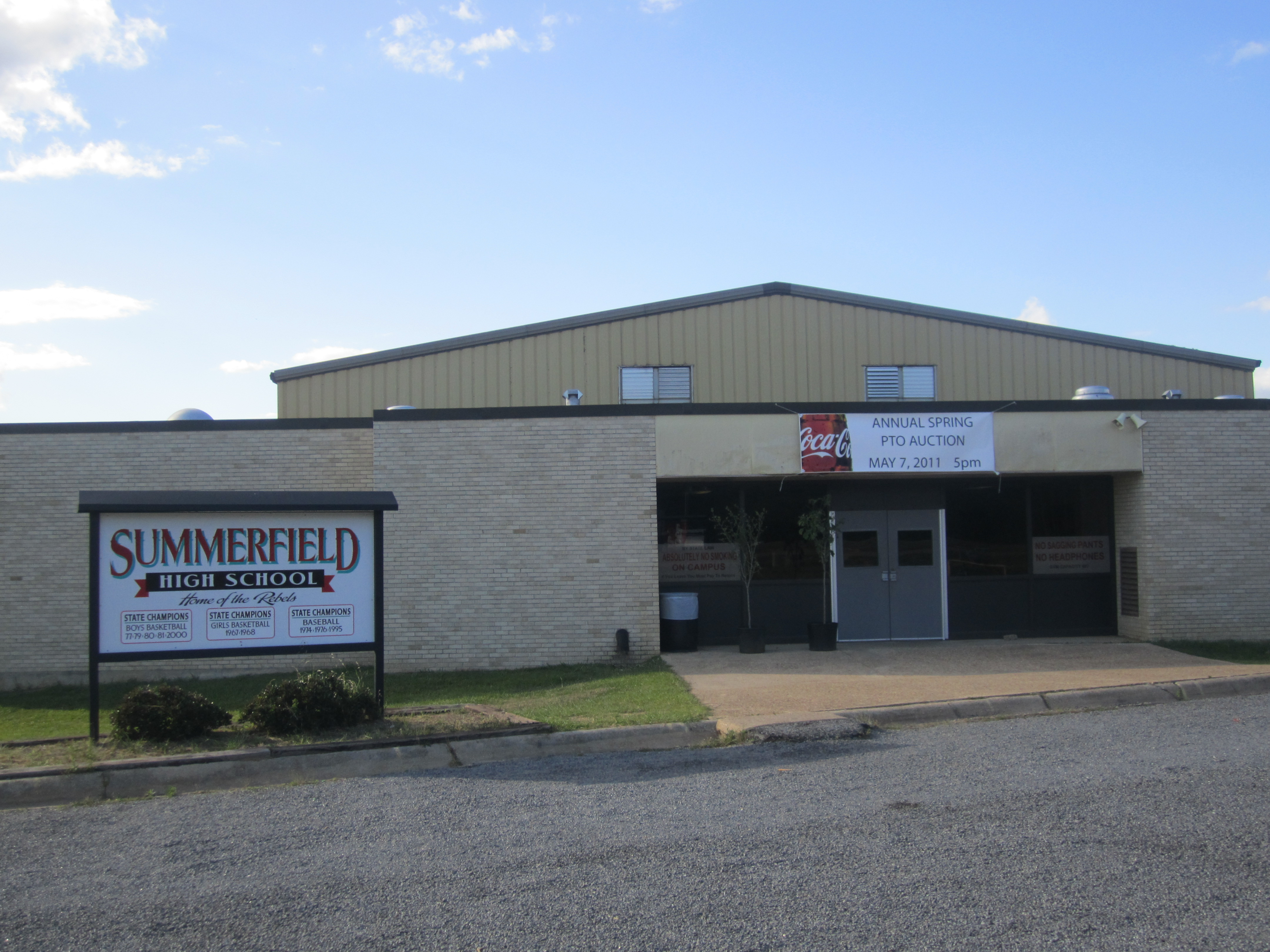

Location
- 4200 Highway 9 Summerfield, (Claiborne Parish), Louisiana 71079; United States; 32.9137°N 92.8279°W

Information
- Type: Public high school
- Established: 1921
- School district: Claiborne Parish School Board
- Staff: 19.34 (FTE)
- Enrollment: 273 (2023-2024)
- Student to teacher ratio: 14.12
- Colors: Red and white
- Mascot: Rebel
- Nickname: Rebels
- Website: www.claibornepsb.org

Summerfield High School is a K-12 school in Summerfield, Claiborne Parish, Louisiana, United States. It is a part of Claiborne Parish School Board.

== Athletics ==
Summerfield High athletics competes in the LHSAA.

=== Championships ===
Boys' Basketball Championship

- (1) 2016

Girls' Basketball Championship

- (1) 2016

Basketball Championship history
Summerfield High won both the boys' and girls' basketball state championships in 2016; although other schools have accomplished similar feats, it was believed to have been the first time it was completed with both teams having the same coach (Randy Carlisle).

== Notable alumni ==
- Cheryl Ford (1999), former WNBA player
- Karl Malone (1981), NBA Hall of Famer

== Bibliography ==
- Some content originated from Summerfield, Louisiana
