= Athens, Louisiana =

- Village
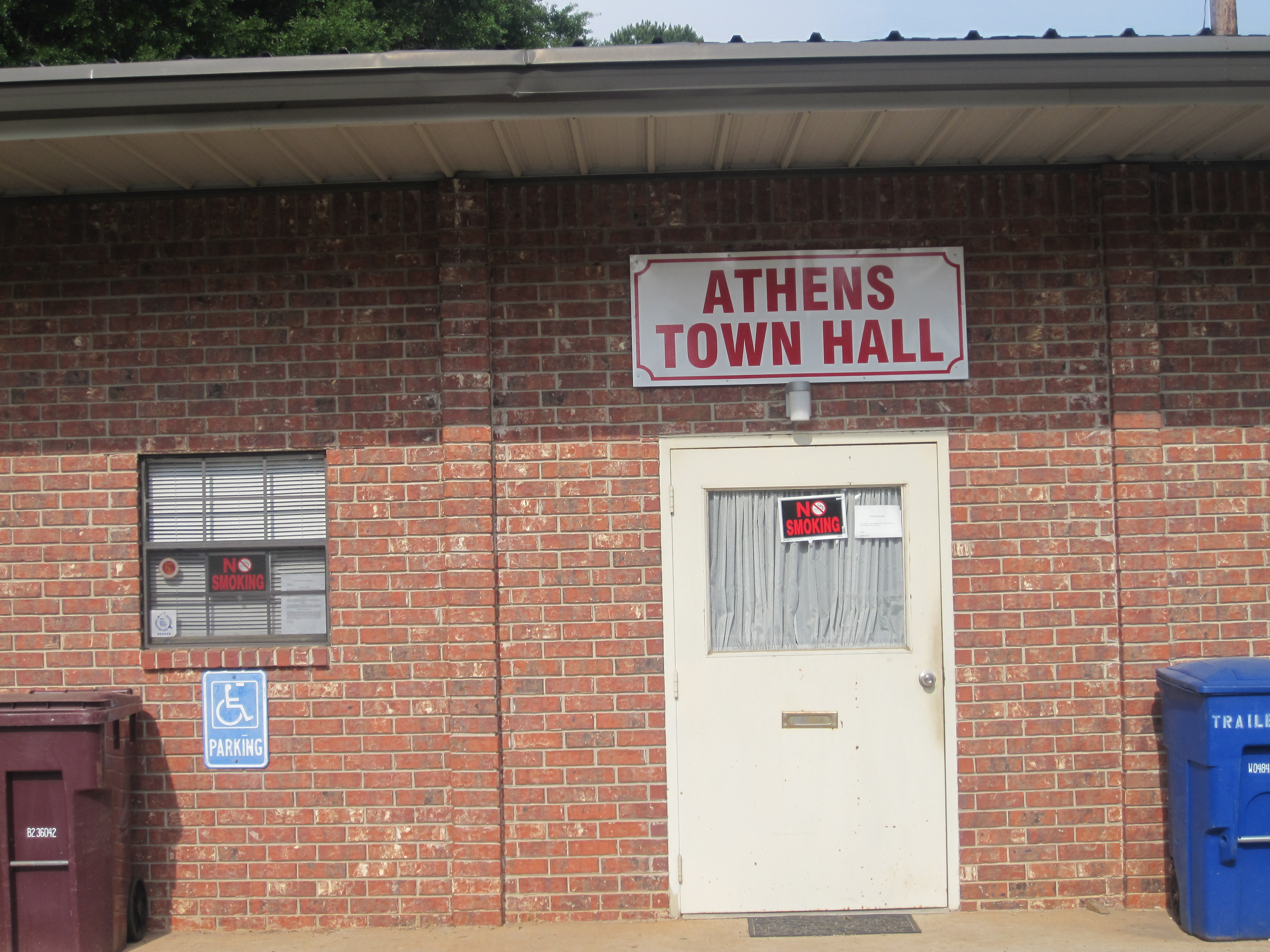
- Athens Town Hall

- Location of Athens in Claiborne Parish, Louisiana.

- Location of Louisiana in the United States

- Location in Louisiana Athens (the United States) Athens (North America)
- Coordinates: 32°39′29″N 93°01′40″W
- Country: United States
- State: Louisiana
- Parish: Claiborne
- Incorporated: 1902

Area
  - Total: 3.50 sq mi (9.07 km^{2})
  - Land: 3.50 sq mi (9.07 km^{2})
  - Water: 0 sq mi (0.00 km^{2})
- Elevation: 367 ft (112 m)

Population (2020)
  - Total: 237
  - Density: 67.7/sq mi (26.13/km^{2})
- Time zone: UTC-6 (CST)
  - Summer (DST): UTC-5 (CDT)
- Area code: 318
- FIPS code: 22-03320
- GNIS feature ID: 2407411
- Website: www.athensla.com

Athens is a village in Claiborne Parish, Louisiana, United States. As of the 2020 census, Athens had a population of 237.

== History ==
The village was named after the ancient city of Athens, capital of Greece. Athens became the parish seat of Claiborne Parish in 1846, but in 1848, fire destroyed the courthouse and all the records in it. Soon thereafter, the Claiborne Parish Police Jury decided to move the parish seat to its present location in Homer.

== Geography ==
According to the United States Census Bureau, the village has a total area of 5.7 km^{2} (2.2 sq mi), all land. The Village also contains the second tallest point in the state of Louisiana, Old Athens Hill.

== Demographics ==
Historical population
Census	Pop.	Note	%±
1910	514		—
1920	493		−4.1%
1930	461		−6.5%
1940	491		6.5%
1950	487		−0.8%
1960	406		−16.6%
1970	387		−4.7%
1980	419		8.3%
1990	278		−33.7%
2000	262		−5.8%
2010	249		−5.0%
2020	237		−4.8%
2025 (est.)	232	▼	−2.1%
U.S. Decennial Census

As of the census of 2000, there were 262 people, 112 households, and 73 families residing in the village. The population density was 119.2 inhabitants per square mile (46.0/km^{2}). There were 137 housing units at an average density of 62.3 per square mile (24.1/km^{2}). The racial makeup of the village was 72.52% White, 24.05% African American, 2.29% Native American, 0.38% Pacific Islander, and 0.76% from two or more races.

There were 112 households, out of which 34.8% had children under the age of 18 living with them, 42.9% were married couples living together, 16.1% had a female householder with no husband present, and 34.8% were non-families. 30.4% of all households were made up of individuals, and 21.4% had someone living alone who was 65 years of age or older. The average household size was 2.34 and the average family size was 2.93.

In the village, the population was spread out, with 28.6% under the age of 18, 5.7% from 18 to 24, 27.1% from 25 to 44, 19.8% from 45 to 64, and 18.7% who were 65 years of age or older. The median age was 37 years. For every 100 females, there were 83.2 males. For every 100 females age 18 and over, there were 78.1 males.

The median income for a household in the village was $18,750, and the median income for a family was $26,750. Males had a median income of $23,393 versus $22,250 for females. The per capita income for the village was $13,033. About 7.0% of families and 14.2% of the population were below the poverty line, including 13.6% of those under the age of eighteen and 20.0% of those 65 or over.

== Government and infrastructure ==
The United States Postal Service operates the Athens Post Office.

== Education ==
Claiborne Parish School Board is the school district for all of the parish. Students go to schools in Homer, including Homer High School. Prior to 2012, students were zoned to the Pre-K-12 Athens High School. The school had 162 students in February 2012. It closed in summer 2012, with students moved to Homer schools.

The Mt. Olive Christian School, pre-kindergarten through twelfth grade, operates in the former Athens High School building, constructed in 1930, with the last graduating class there in 1969.

== Notable people ==
- Dorothy Brown (born 1953), politician
- Jessie Johnson Couch, wife of Harvey Couch, was an Athens native.
