= James T. McCalman =

American politician

Member of the Louisiana State Senate
- In office 1960–1964
- Preceded by: William M. Rainach
- Succeeded by: Danny Roy Moore

Personal details
- Born: James Thomas McCalman; February 15, 1914
- Died: June 18, 1977 (aged 63) Homer, Louisiana, U.S.
- Party: Democratic
- Spouse: Gladys McCalman (m. 1939)
- Children: 5

James Thomas McCalman (February 15, 1914 – June 18, 1977) was an American politician. He served as a Democratic member of the Louisiana State Senate.

McCalman attended Homer High School. He served as a member of the Claiborne Parish Police Jury. McCalman had worked as a businessperson. In 1960, he was elected to the Louisiana State Senate, succeeding William M. Rainach. In 1964, he was succeeded by Danny Roy Moore for the office.

McCalman died in June 1977 at the Homer Memorial Hospital, at the age of 63. He was buried in Arlington Cemetery.
