= Claiborne Academy =

Segregation academy in Louisiana, US

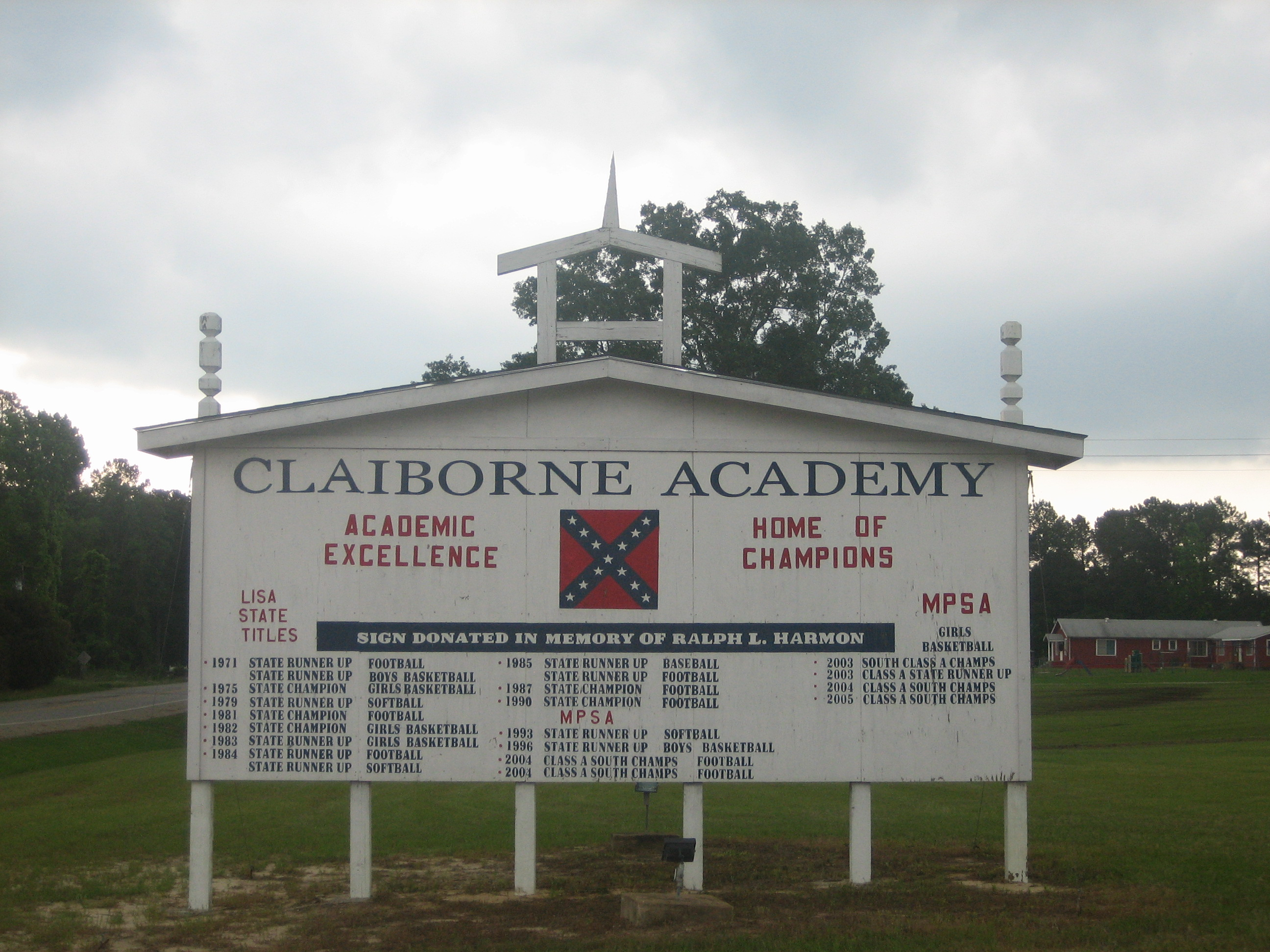
- Claiborne Academy athletic field, with Confederate symbolism

Location
- 6741 Highway 79; Haynesville, Claiborne Parish, Louisiana 71038; 32.8630667°N 93.0822391°W

Information
- Founded: 1969
- NCES School ID: 00542371
- Head teacher: Sue Barfield
- Grades: preschool-12
- Colors: Ruby red and royal blue
- Mascot: Rebels
- Accreditation: Mississippi Association of Independent Schools
- Newspaper: Rebel Yell
- Website: https://claiborneacademy.org/
- Last updated: 8 January 2018

Claiborne Academy is a private, non-profit, pre-kindergarten through 12th grade school located in unincorporated Claiborne Parish, Louisiana, between Haynesville and Homer. It was founded in 1969 as a segregation academy. Their nickname is the Rebels, the school newspaper is the Rebel Yell, and their school symbol is the Confederate battle flag.

== History ==
Prior to the fall of 1969, the state of Louisiana maintained a racially segregated system of schools. One set of schools educated White students, and a second, much less well-funded set of schools educated Black students. In the 1954 United States Supreme Court decision Brown v. Board of Education, this system was declared illegal, stating that integration must occur with "all deliberate speed". Many states, including Louisiana, did little or nothing to remedy the situation. In the 1969 case Alexander v. Holmes County Board of Education the court forced the immediate desegregation of all public schools. In their decision, the Court wrote, "The obligation of every school district is to terminate dual school systems at once and to operate now and hereafter only unitary schools." The pace of "all deliberate speed" set in Brown v Board was no longer permissible.

The reaction of White parents across the south was to establish a new system of all-White private schools, yet with continued government funding.

One such group of White parents in Claiborne Parish founded Claiborne Academy in August, 1969. One of the founders was William M. Rainach, a state legislator who was the first chairman of the Louisiana Joint Legislative Committee, which was formed to fight school integration in the state. In their rush to avoid having their children attend schools with Black students, they opened the 1969–1970 school year in two locations, one in Homer, and the other in Haynesville. The Homer campus opened on September 8, 1969, while the Haynesville campus opened on September 15. Tuition was $40 for one child, $70 for two, and $90 for three or more children. Piano lessons were offered for an extra $3 per lesson. The school announced that "School books, paper and pencils will be made available by the state to the private school students, since these items go to the child and not to the school." They also announced that donations were tax deductible and would help pay for housing, furniture, and fixtures.

By the following year, a new school had been constructed to replace those locations, and the grades served expanded through grade 12. In 1971, a group of African-Americans filed suit against the state, naming Claiborne and 9 other segregation academies. The complaint centered on the states provision of free textbooks and bus transportation to segregated schools that excluded Blacks.

The school joined the Louisiana Independent School Association, commonly known as LISA, an association that supported all-white segregation academies in the state. At the time, LISA rules for athletic competition prohibited any potential competition with non-member schools, which could potentially have Black players. LISA dissolved in 1992. Claiborne Academy then joined the Mississippi Private School Association, which is now known as the Midsouth Association of Independent Schools, which was similarly founded to provide accreditation and athletics to segregation academies in Mississippi. Claiborne academy was one of the defendants in the case Brumfield v Dodd, which prohibited private schools that discriminated against African-Americans from maintaining tax-exempt status with the IRS. As a result of Brumfield v Dodd, private schools which wish to receive state funding were required to be certified each year.

== Demographics ==
As of 2023, the school enrolled one Black student (less than one percent) and 167 White students (more than 99 percent), out of a total enrollment of 168.

== Athletics ==
When the school was founded, they chose the Confederate Rebel as their mascot. The school colors are red and blue.

=== Bibliography ===
- Doherty, Patric J. (1970). "Integration Now: A Study of Alexander v. Holmes County Board of Education". Notre Dame Law Review. 45 (3): 489–514. ISSN 0745-3515.
- Woodward, Bob; Armstrong, Scott (1979). The Brethren. Simon & Schuster. ISBN 0-671-24110-9.
