= Claiborne Parish, Louisiana =

Parish in Louisiana, United States

Coordinates: 32.82°N 92.99°W

- Parish
- Parish of Claiborne; Paroisse de Claiborne (French)
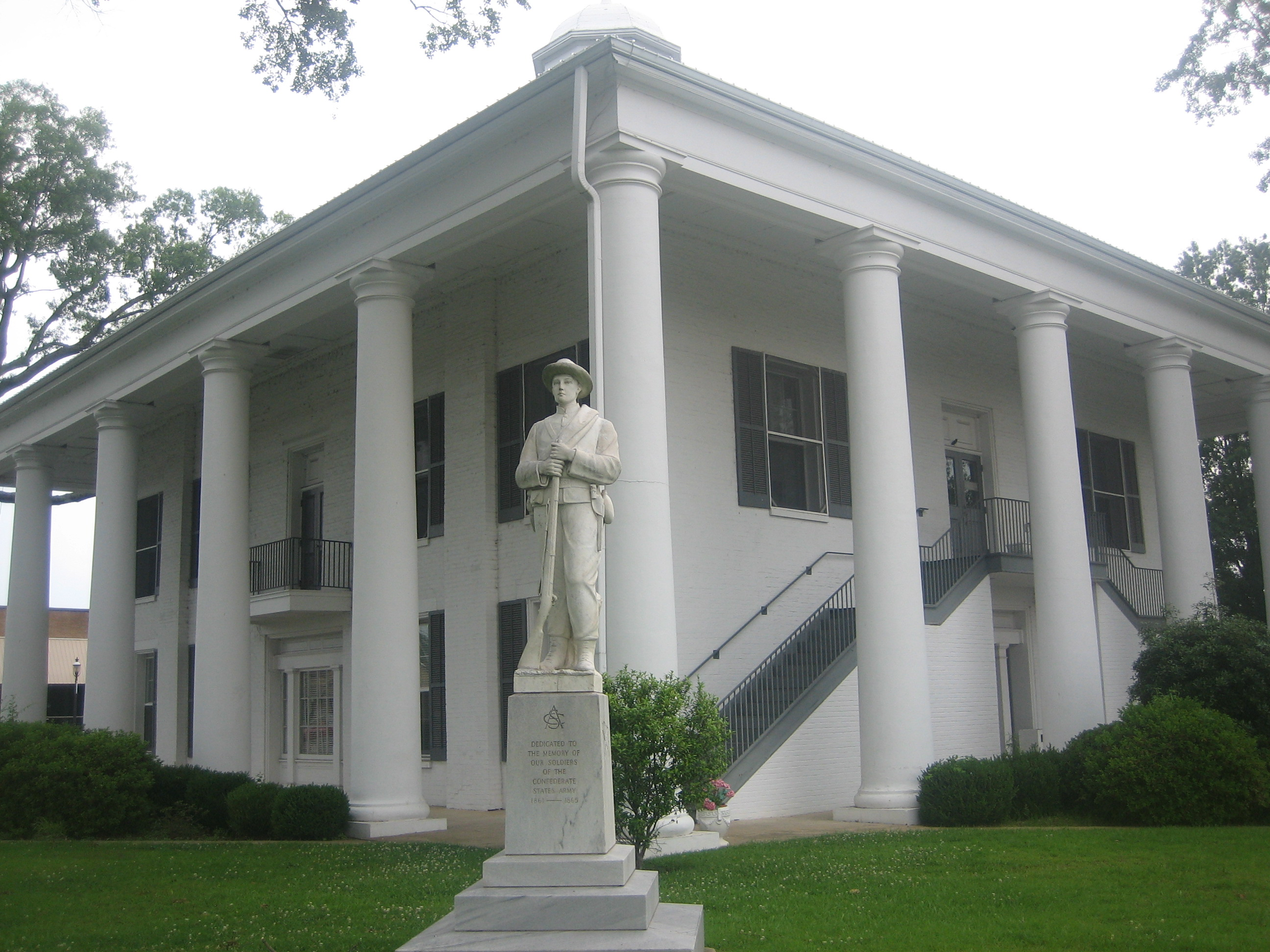
- The Claiborne Parish Courthouse was built in 1860 in Greek style. It served as a point of departure for Confederate troops.

- Location within the U.S. state of Louisiana

- Louisiana's location within the U.S.
- Country: United States
- State: Louisiana
- Region: North Louisiana
- Founded: March 15, 1828
- Named for: William C. C. Claiborne
- Parish seat: Homer
- Largest municipality: Lisbon (area); Homer (population)

Area
  - Total: 767 sq mi (1,990 km^{2})
  - Land: 755 sq mi (1,960 km^{2})
  - Water: 13 sq mi (34 km^{2})
  - percentage: 1.6 sq mi (4.1 km^{2})

Population (2020)
  - Total: 14,170
  - Estimate (2025): 13,354 ▼
  - Density: 18.8/sq mi (7.25/km^{2})
- Time zone: UTC-6 (CST)
  - Summer (DST): UTC-5 (CDT)
- Area code: 318
- Congressional district: 4th
- Website: Claiborne Parish Government

Claiborne Parish (French: Paroisse de Claiborne) is a parish located in the northwestern section of the U.S. state of Louisiana. The parish was formed in 1828, and was named for the first Louisiana governor, William C. C. Claiborne. As of the 2020 census, the population was 14,170. The parish seat is Homer.

== History ==
John Murrell moved his family from Arkansas to the Flat Lick Bayou area about 6 miles west of present-day Homer in 1818, and they became the first known non-natives to permanently settle in Claiborne Parish. As more settlers moved into the area, the Murrell house served as a church, school and post office. When the state legislature created Claiborne Parish out of Natchitoches Parish in 1828, all governmental business, including court, began being held in the Murrell house. This continued until the new parish's police jury selected Russellville (now a ghost town located northeast of Athens) as the parish seat. As the population began swelling in what was then the western part of the parish, the seat was moved to Overton (another modern ghost town found near Minden) in 1836, because of its position at the head of the navigable portion of Dorcheat Bayou. Due to flooding and health concerns, the parish seat was moved to Athens in 1846, but an 1848 fire destroyed the courthouse and all the records in it. Soon thereafter the Claiborne Police Jury chose the present site for the parish seat, which came to be named, Homer.

Much of the area history is preserved in the Herbert S. Ford Memorial Museum, located across from the parish courthouse in Homer.

== Government and infrastructure ==
Louisiana Department of Public Safety and Corrections operates the David Wade Correctional Center in an unincorporated section of Claiborne Parish near Homer and Haynesville.

== Geography ==
According to the U.S. Census Bureau, the parish has a total area of 767 square miles (1,990 km^{2}), of which 755 square miles (1,960 km^{2}) is land and 13 square miles (34 km^{2}) (1.6%) is water.

=== Major highways ===
- Future Interstate 69
- U.S. Highway 63
- U.S. Highway 79
- U.S. Highway 167
- Louisiana Highway 2
  - LA 2 Alt.
- Louisiana Highway 9
- Louisiana Highway 146
- Louisiana Highway 152
- Louisiana Highway 154
- Louisiana Highway 161
- Louisiana Highway 518
- Louisiana Highway 519
- Louisiana Highway 520
- Louisiana Highway 521
- Louisiana Highway 533
- Louisiana Highway 534
- Louisiana Highway 540
- Louisiana Highway 615
- Louisiana Highway 805
- Louisiana Highway 806
- Louisiana Highway 807
- Louisiana Highway 808
- Louisiana Highway 3062

=== Adjacent parishes ===
- Columbia County, Arkansas (northwest)
- Union County, Arkansas (northeast)
- Union Parish (east)
- Lincoln Parish (southeast)
- Bienville Parish (south)
- Webster Parish (west)

=== National protected area ===
- Kisatchie National Forest (part)

== Communities ==
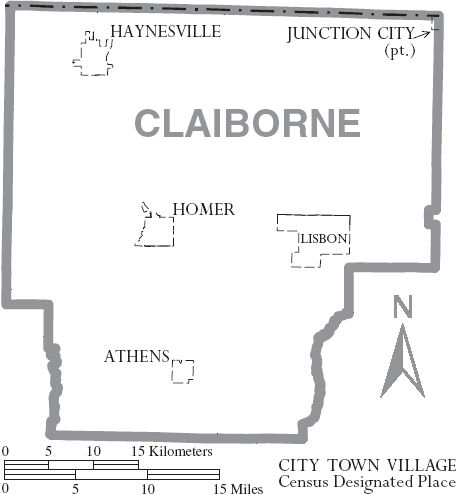

=== Towns ===
- Haynesville
- Homer (parish seat and largest municipality)

=== Villages ===
- Athens
- Lisbon
- Junction City

=== Unincorporated communities ===
- Arizona
- Colquitt
- Lake Claiborne
- Marsalis
- Russellville
- Sugar Creek
- Summerfield
- Weldon

== Demographics ==
Historical population
Census	Pop.	Note	%±
1830	1,764		—
1840	6,185		250.6%
1850	7,471		20.8%
1860	16,848		125.5%
1870	20,240		20.1%
1880	18,837		−6.9%
1890	23,312		23.8%
1900	23,029		−1.2%
1910	25,050		8.8%
1920	27,885		11.3%
1930	32,285		15.8%
1940	29,855		−7.5%
1950	25,063		−16.1%
1960	19,407		−22.6%
1970	17,024		−12.3%
1980	17,095		0.4%
1990	17,405		1.8%
2000	16,851		−3.2%
2010	17,195		2.0%
2020	14,170		−17.6%
2025 (est.)	13,354	▼	−5.8%
U.S. Decennial Census; 1790-1960 1900-1990; 1990-2000 2010-2013

=== 2020 census ===
As of the 2020 census, the parish had a population of 14,170, 5,498 households, and 3,718 families. The median age was 45.0 years; 18.8% of residents were under the age of 18 and 21.2% of residents were 65 years of age or older. For every 100 females there were 114.3 males, and for every 100 females age 18 and over there were 118.5 males age 18 and over.

The racial makeup of the parish was 51.3% White, 43.6% Black or African American, 0.3% American Indian and Alaska Native, 0.3% Asian, <0.1% Native Hawaiian and Pacific Islander, 1.5% from some other race, and 3.0% from two or more races. Hispanic or Latino residents of any race comprised 3.4% of the population.

<0.1% of residents lived in urban areas, while 100.0% lived in rural areas.

There were 5,498 households in the parish, of which 26.7% had children under the age of 18 living in them. Of all households, 37.5% were married-couple households, 22.4% were households with a male householder and no spouse or partner present, and 35.6% were households with a female householder and no spouse or partner present. About 34.8% of all households were made up of individuals and 16.0% had someone living alone who was 65 years of age or older.

There were 6,775 housing units in the parish, of which 18.8% were vacant. Among occupied housing units, 74.2% were owner-occupied and 25.8% were renter-occupied. The homeowner vacancy rate was 1.7% and the rental vacancy rate was 8.6%.

=== Racial and ethnic composition ===
Claiborne Parish, Louisiana – Racial and ethnic composition Note: the US Census treats Hispanic/Latino as an ethnic category. This table excludes Latinos from the racial categories and assigns them to a separate category. Hispanics/Latinos may be of any race.
Race / Ethnicity (NH = Non-Hispanic)	Pop 1980	Pop 1990	Pop 2000	Pop 2010	Pop 2020	% 1980	% 1990	% 2000	% 2010	% 2020
White alone (NH)	9,032	9,300	8,679	8,084	7,064	52.83%	53.43%	51.50%	47.01%	49.85%
Black or African American alone (NH)	7,851	8,022	7,925	8,707	6,138	45.93%	46.09%	47.03%	50.64%	43.32%
Native American or Alaska Native alone (NH)	2	28	24	59	43	0.01%	0.16%	0.14%	0.34%	0.30%
Asian alone (NH)	10	13	14	39	42	0.06%	0.07%	0.08%	0.23%	0.30%
Native Hawaiian or Pacific Islander alone (NH)	x	x	2	1	0	x	x	0.01%	0.01%	0.00%
Other race alone (NH)	13	2	2	2	21	0.08%	0.01%	0.01%	0.01%	0.15%
Mixed race or Multiracial (NH)	x	x	77	132	383	x	x	0.46%	0.77%	2.70%
Hispanic or Latino (any race)	187	40	128	171	479	1.09%	0.23%	0.76%	0.99%	3.38%
Total	17,095	17,405	16,851	17,195	14,170	100.00%	100.00%	100.00%	100.00%	100.00%

== Politics ==
With a narrow majority of African Americans in the population, Claiborne Parish in the years after the civil rights movement was primarily Democratic in political complexion. In 1988, Vice President George H. W. Bush prevailed in Claiborne Parish with 3,756 votes (53.6 percent). Governor Michael S. Dukakis of Massachusetts trailed with 3,158 votes (45.1 percent). In 1996, U.S. President Bill Clinton, of neighboring Arkansas, obtained 3,609 votes (53.6 percent) in Claiborne Parish. Republican Bob Dole of Kansas polled 2,500 votes (37.1 percent).

However, by 2008, Senator John McCain easily carried the parish in his losing race to Barack Obama. McCain polled 3,750 votes (54.8 percent) to Obama's 3,025 votes (44.2 percent). In 2012, Mitt Romney carried the parish, with 3,649 votes (54.2 percent), nearly identical to McCain's tally four years earlier. President Obama received 3,014 votes (44.8 percent), a 0.6% increase.

United States presidential election results for Claiborne Parish, Louisiana
Year	Republican		Democratic		Third party(ies)	
Year	No.	%	No.	%	No.	%
1912	10	1.18%	785	92.24%	56	6.58%
1916	15	1.16%	1,276	98.76%	1	0.08%
1920	48	3.80%	1,216	96.20%	0	0.00%
1924	54	4.13%	1,252	95.87%	0	0.00%
1928	249	13.76%	1,560	86.24%	0	0.00%
1932	61	2.16%	2,765	97.84%	0	0.00%
1936	146	5.39%	2,563	94.54%	2	0.07%
1940	187	5.78%	3,049	94.22%	0	0.00%
1944	578	20.32%	2,266	79.68%	0	0.00%
1948	265	9.51%	457	16.40%	2,064	74.08%
1952	2,796	64.63%	1,530	35.37%	0	0.00%
1956	2,084	53.63%	810	20.84%	992	25.53%
1960	1,336	34.67%	489	12.69%	2,029	52.65%
1964	3,917	89.04%	482	10.96%	0	0.00%
1968	1,117	18.70%	1,545	25.87%	3,311	55.43%
1972	3,432	64.08%	1,551	28.96%	373	6.96%
1976	3,216	51.81%	2,891	46.58%	100	1.61%
1980	3,538	50.01%	3,443	48.67%	93	1.31%
1984	4,349	60.29%	2,788	38.65%	77	1.07%
1988	3,756	53.60%	3,158	45.07%	93	1.33%
1992	2,599	37.15%	3,263	46.64%	1,134	16.21%
1996	2,500	37.10%	3,609	53.55%	630	9.35%
2000	3,384	53.88%	2,721	43.32%	176	2.80%
2004	3,704	55.87%	2,854	43.05%	72	1.09%
2008	3,750	54.82%	3,025	44.22%	66	0.96%
2012	3,649	54.20%	3,014	44.77%	69	1.02%
2016	3,585	55.83%	2,717	42.31%	119	1.85%
2020	3,770	57.29%	2,731	41.50%	79	1.20%
2024	3,522	60.56%	2,239	38.50%	55	0.95%

== Education ==
Claiborne Parish School Board serves the entire parish.

Claiborne Academy is a private institution in an unincorporated area in the parish, near Haynesville.

== Notable people ==
Prominent Claiborne Parish residents include or have included:

- Henry Walton Bibb American author, abolitionist, and former slave from 1839 to 1841
- T. H. Harris, state education superintendent from 1908 to 1940.
- Andrew R. Johnson was a state senator from Claiborne and Bienville parishes from 1916 to 1924.
- John Sidney Killen, state representative for Claiborne Parish in 1871
- Joe LeSage, state senator for Caddo Parish from 1968 to 1972; Shreveport attorney born in Homer
- George H. Mahon, Former U.S. Representative.
- James T. McCalman, state senator from Claiborne and Bienville parishes from 1960 to 1964.
- Danny Roy Moore, state senator from 1964 to 1968.
- Dave L. Pearce, Louisiana Commissioner of Agriculture and Forestry from 1952 to 1956 and 1960–1976.
- Larry Sale, sheriff of Claiborne Parish from 1936 to 1944; bodyguard at the assassination of Huey Pierce Long Jr.
- Richard Stalder, former secretary of the Louisiana Department of Public Safety and Corrections.
- David Wade, Lieutenant General of the United States Air Force.
- Loy F. Weaver, state representative from 1976 to 1984.
- Mule Watson, pitcher in Major League Baseball from 1918 to 1924.
- Pinkie C. Wilkerson state representative from 1992 to 2000.
- Patrick Floyd Garrett, Sheriff of Lincoln County New Mexico, and killer of Billy the Kid.

== Gallery ==
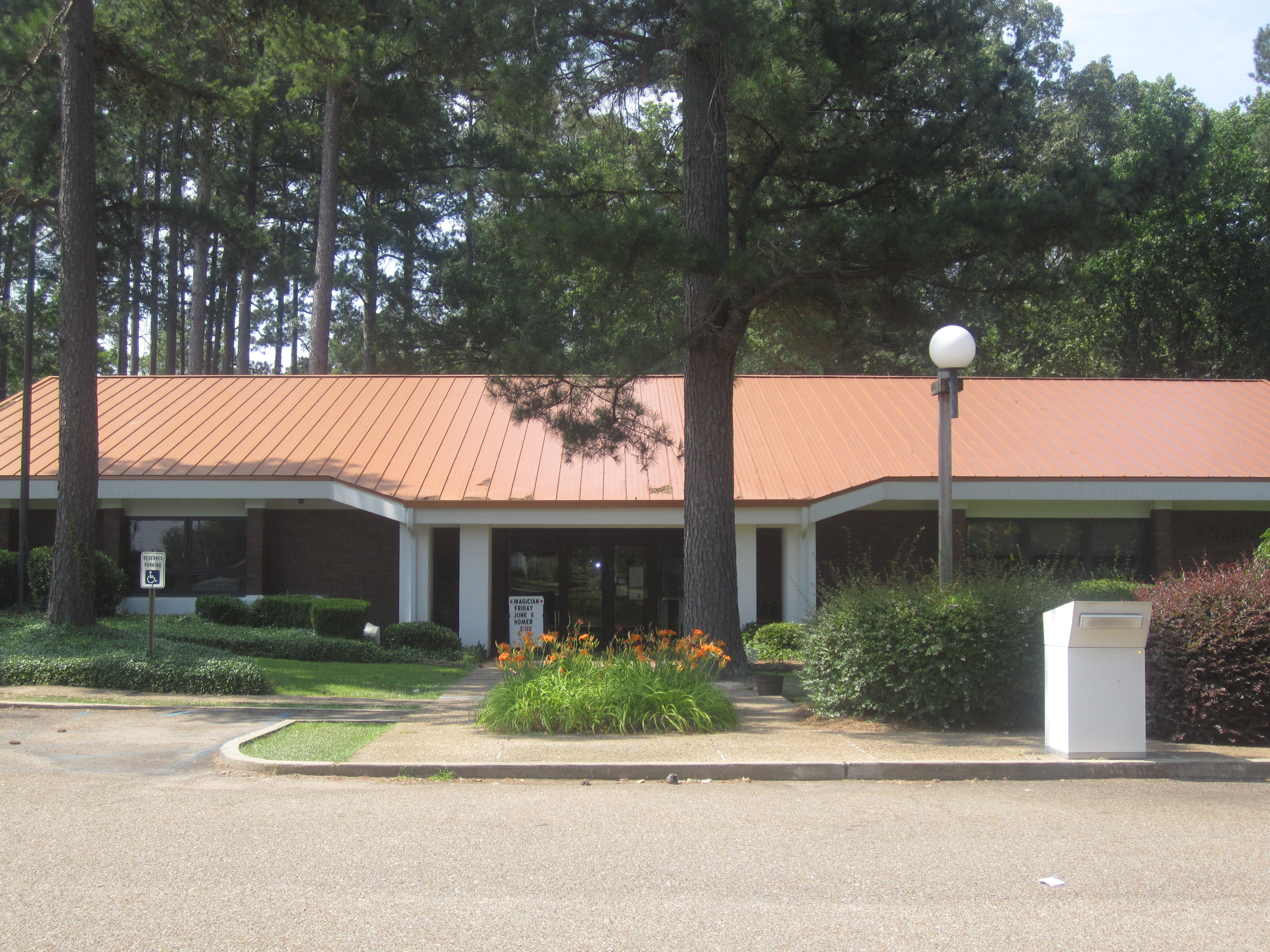
Claiborne Parish Library in Homer, Louisiana

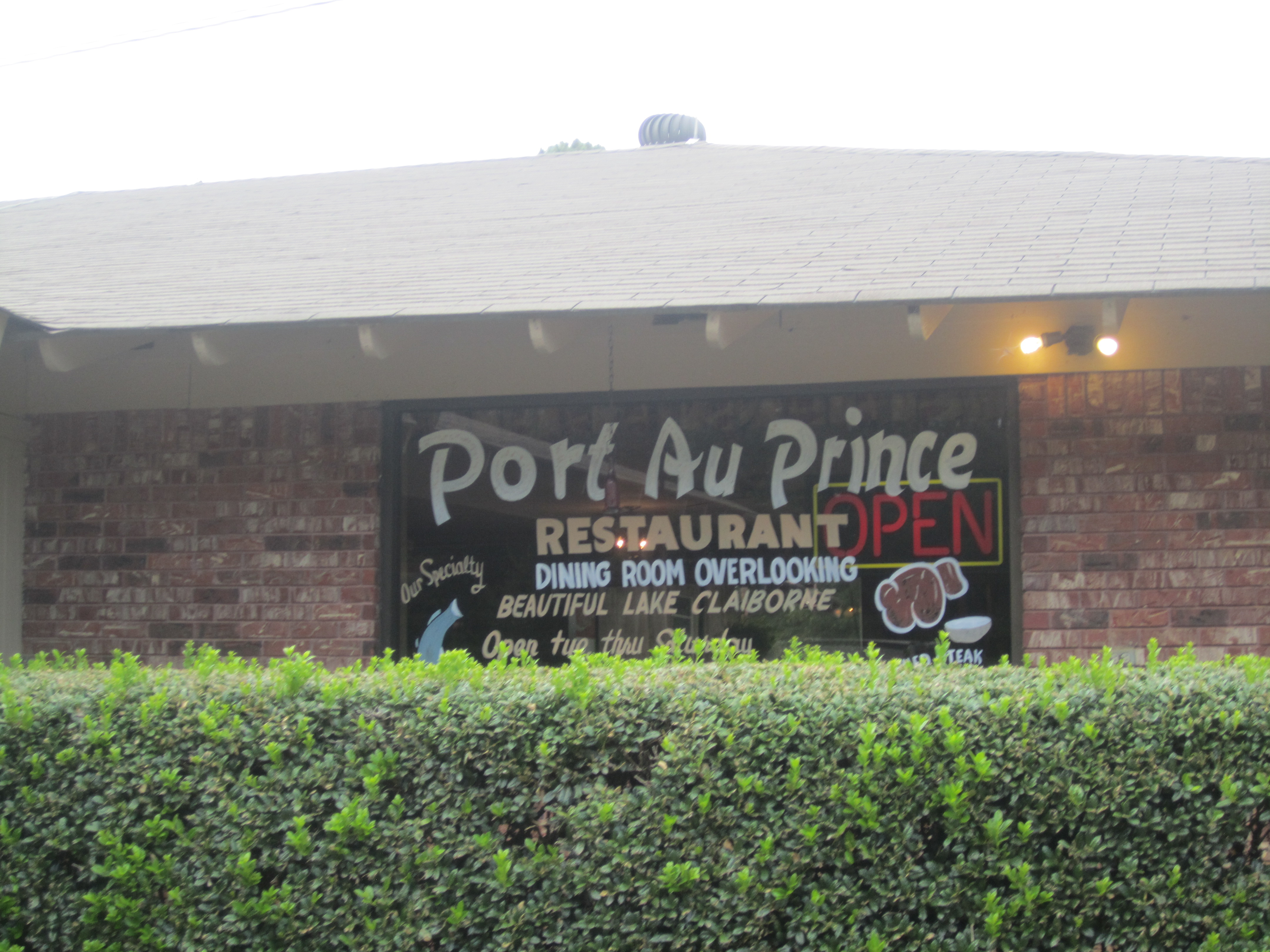
The Port-au-Prince Restaurant on Louisiana Highway 146 at Lake Claiborne.

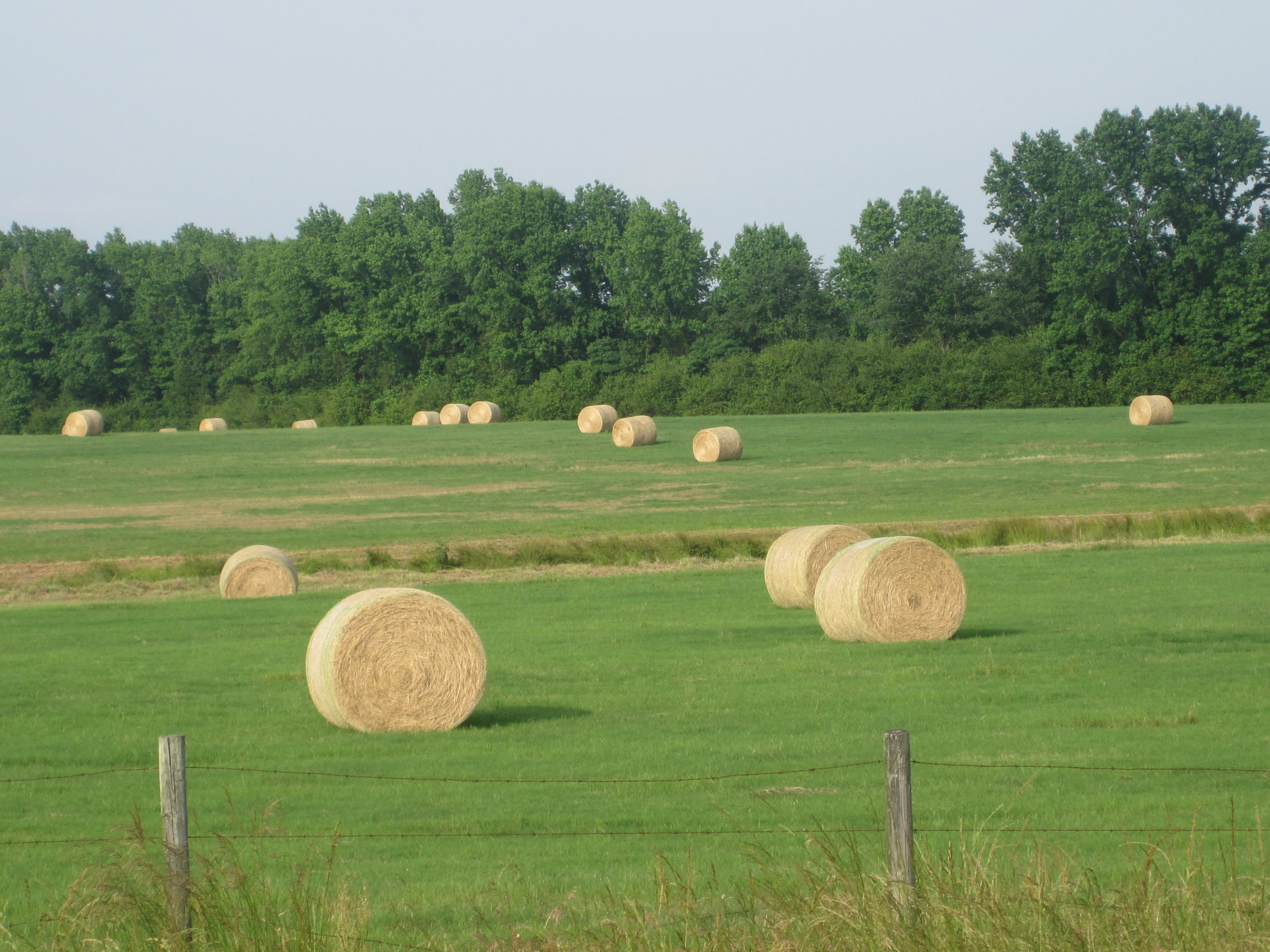
Rolled hay in a farm field north of Athens (May 2010)

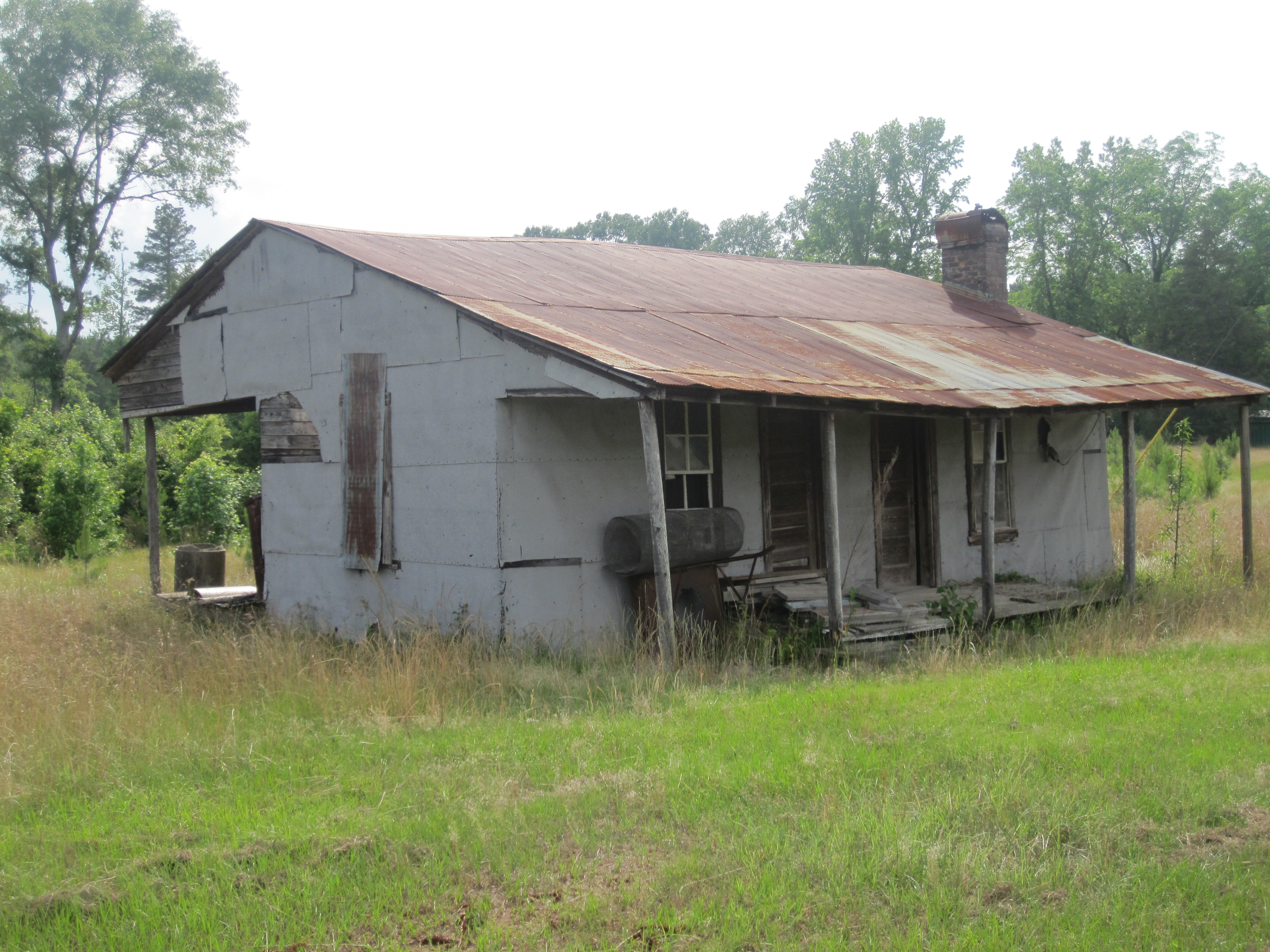
Abandoned house in western Claiborne Parish.

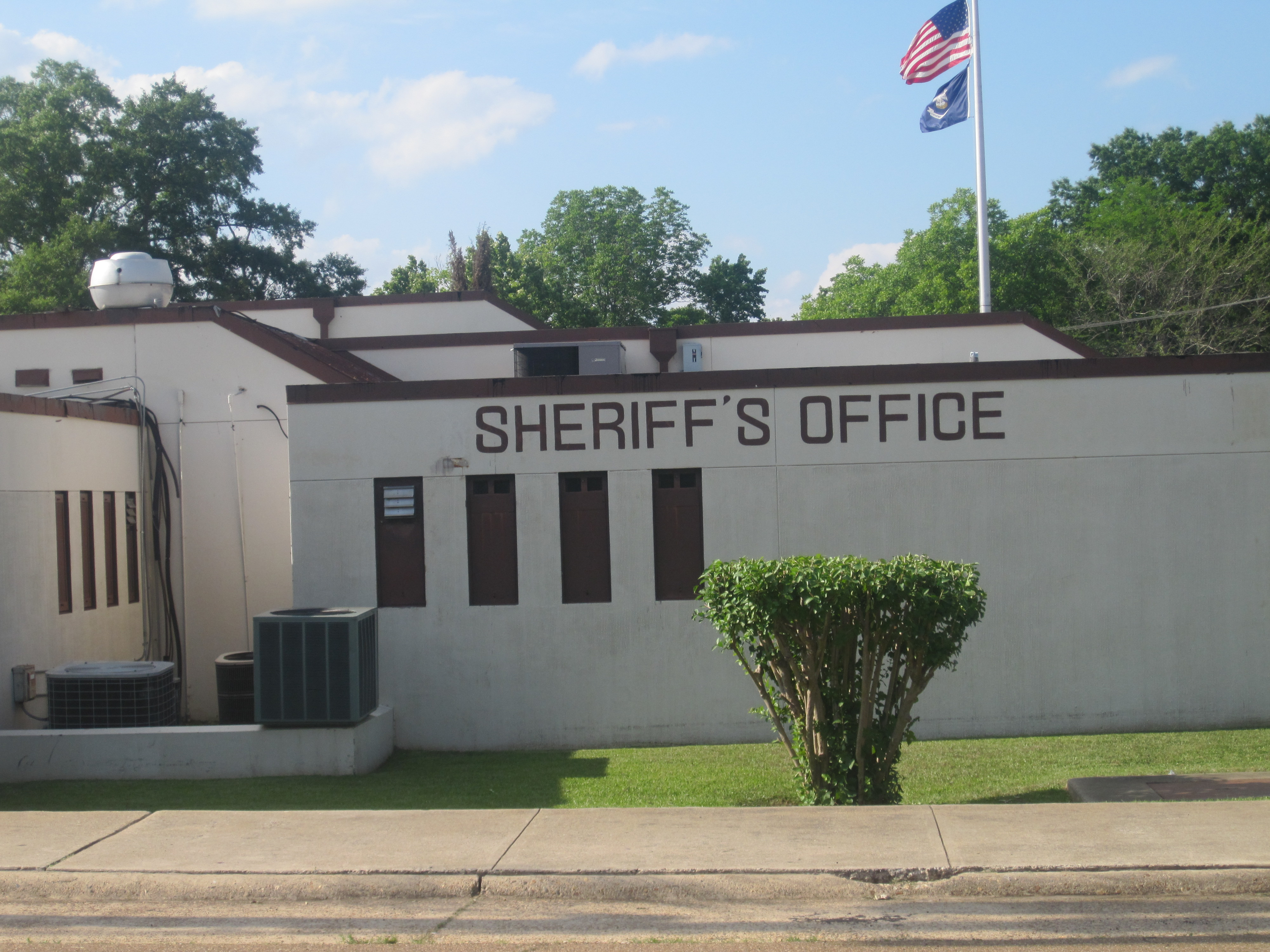
Claiborne Parish Sheriff's Department in Homer, Louisiana

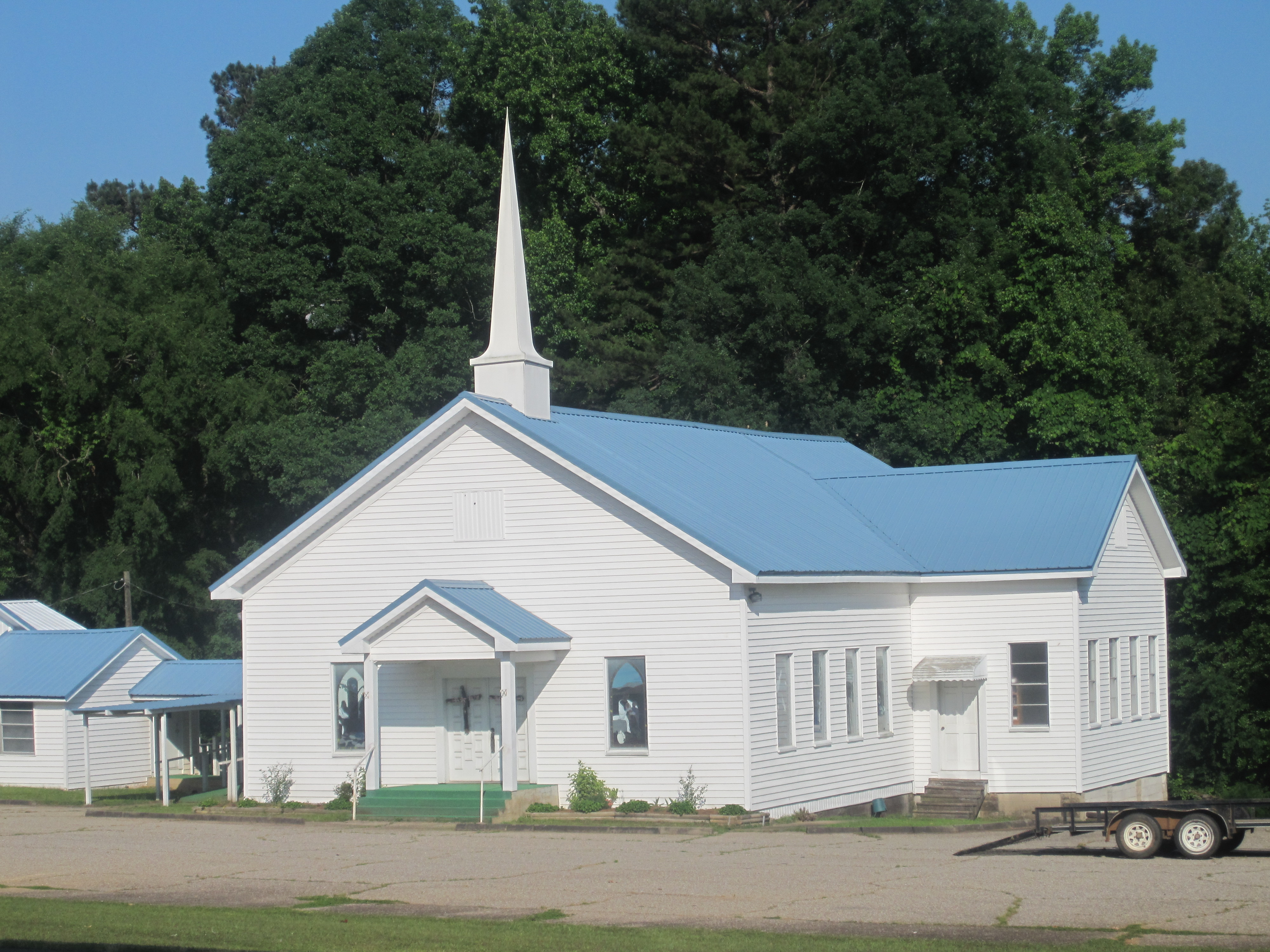
Holly Springs Baptist Church west of Homer on U.S. Highway 79

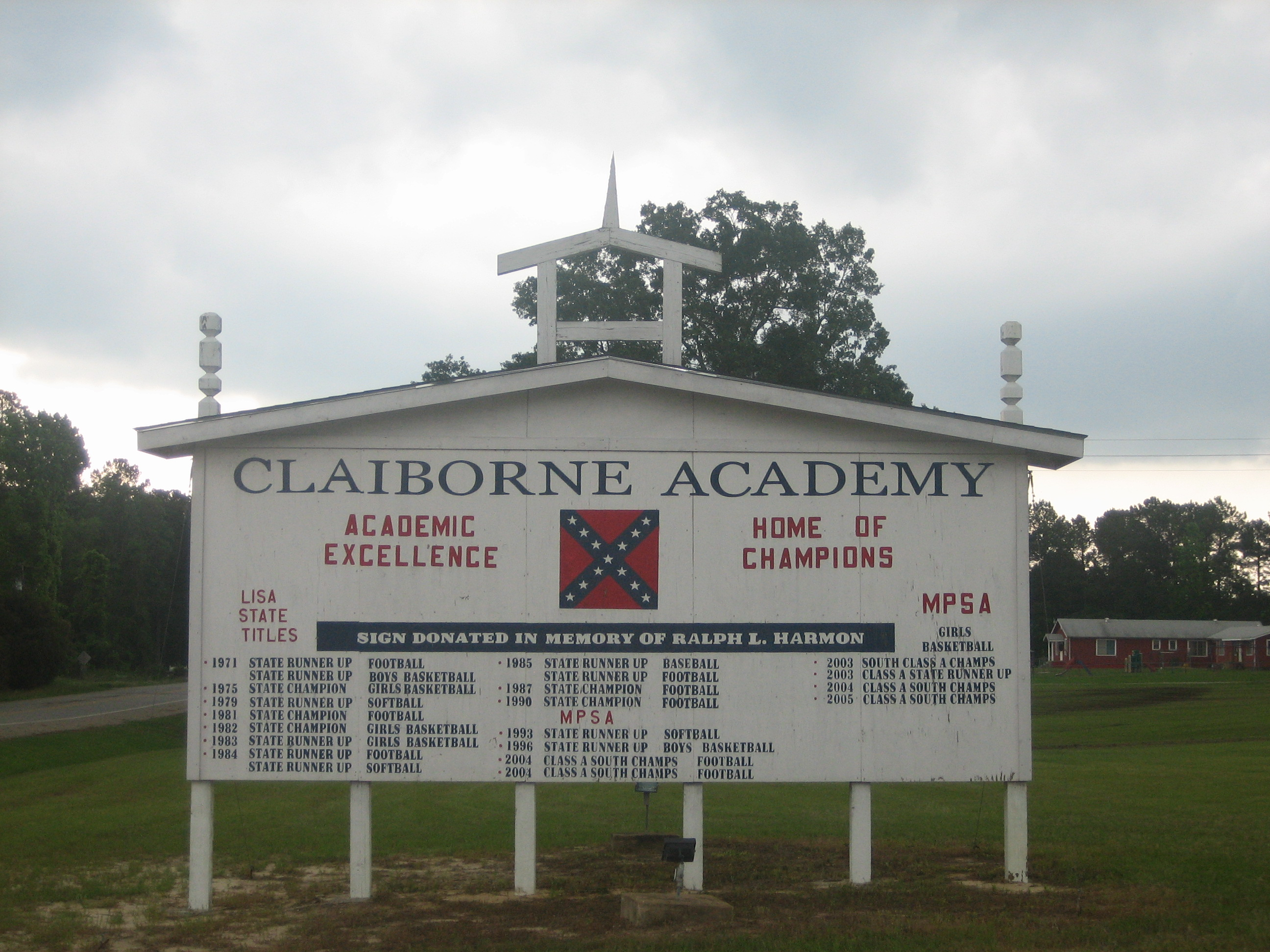
Claiborne Academy

== See also ==
- National Register of Historic Places listings in Claiborne Parish, Louisiana
