= Homer High School (Louisiana) =

High school in Louisiana, United States

Location
- 1008 North Main Street; Homer, (Claiborne Parish), Louisiana 71040; United States; 32.7928°N 93.0677°W

Information
- Type: Public high school
- School district: Claiborne Parish School Board
- Principal: Lee Simms
- Teaching staff: 13.95 (FTE)
- Enrollment: 249 (2023-2024)
- Student to teacher ratio: 17.85
- Colors: Purple and white
- Mascot: Pelicans
- Website: www.claibornepsb.org

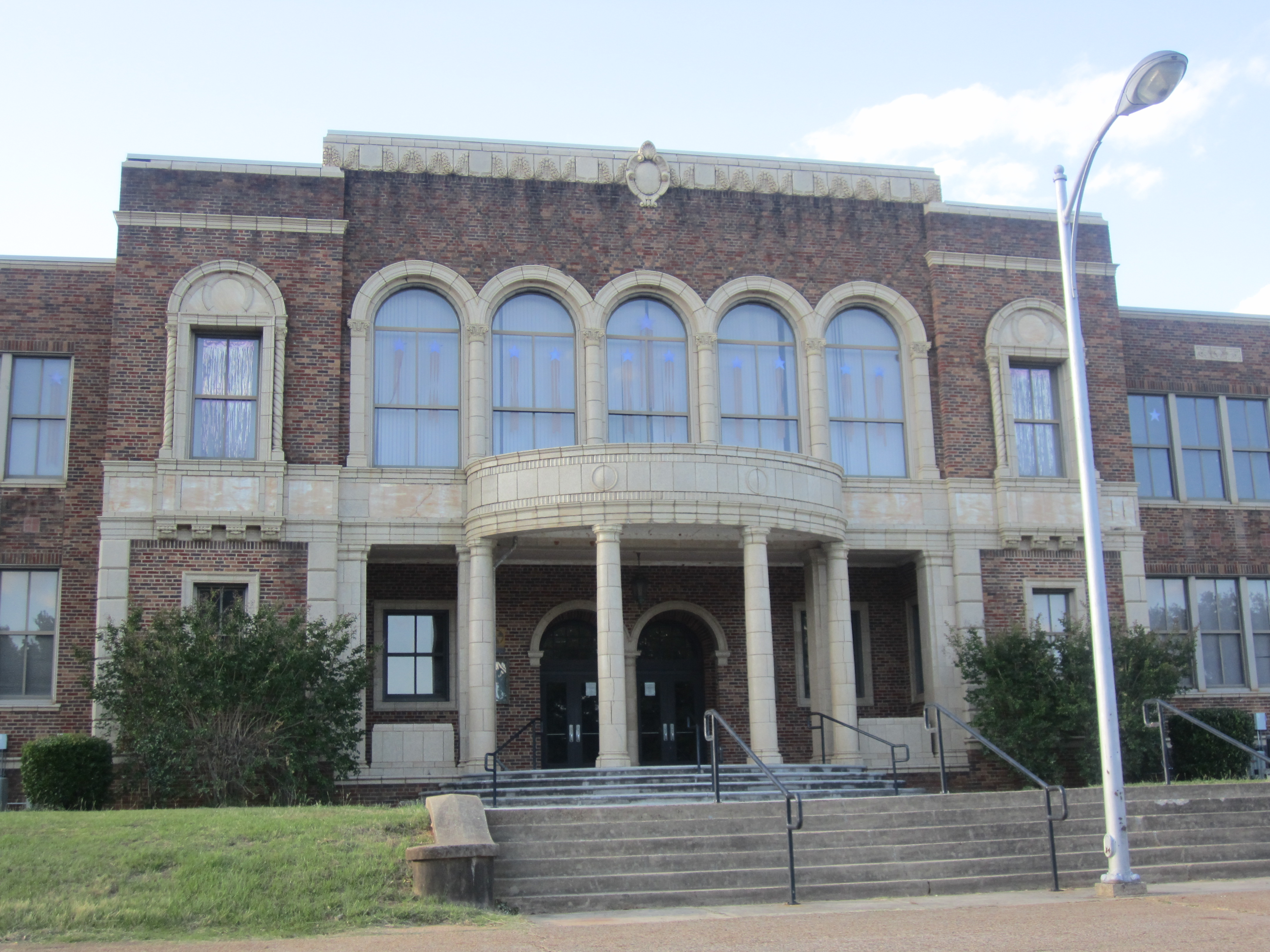
Homer High School

Homer High School is a senior high school in Homer, Louisiana, United States and a part of the Claiborne Parish School Board.

== History ==
In 2012 Athens High School (a PreK-12 school) in Athens closed, with students moved to Homer schools.

== Athletics ==
Homer High athletics competes in the LHSAA.

=== Championships ===
Football championships

- (5) State Championships: 1923, 1928, 1937, 1939, 2021

In the 2021 1A state championship game, Homer defeated Logansport 41-28 at the Caesars Superdome in New Orleans.

== Band ==
In 2011, the school district closed Homer High's band program as one of several measures to reduce the district budget by $2.4 million.

== See also ==
- Homer College former school in Homer, Louisiana
