= Claiborne Parish School Board =

School district in Louisiana, United States

Coordinates: 32.7906°N 93.0548°W

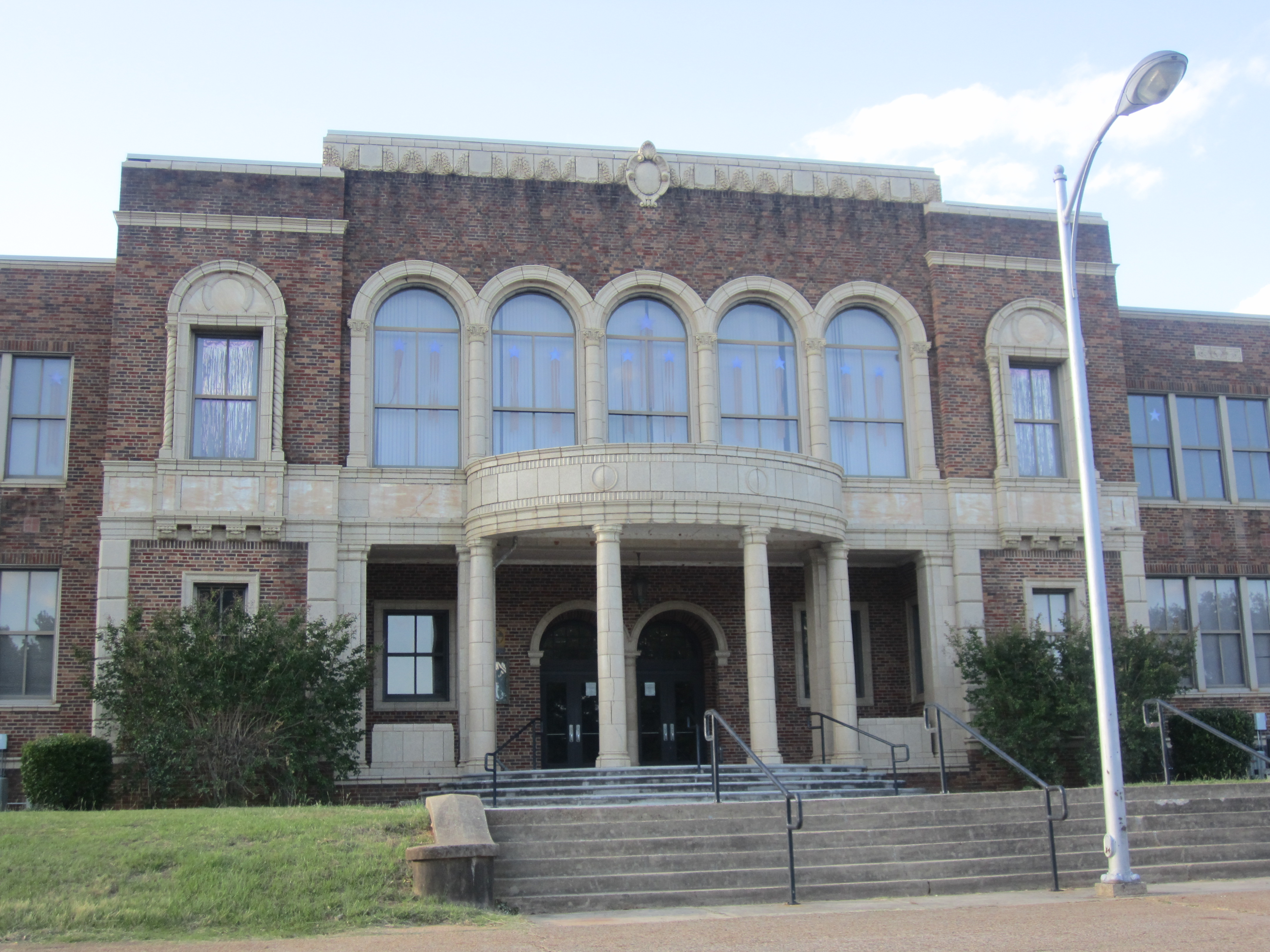
Homer High School

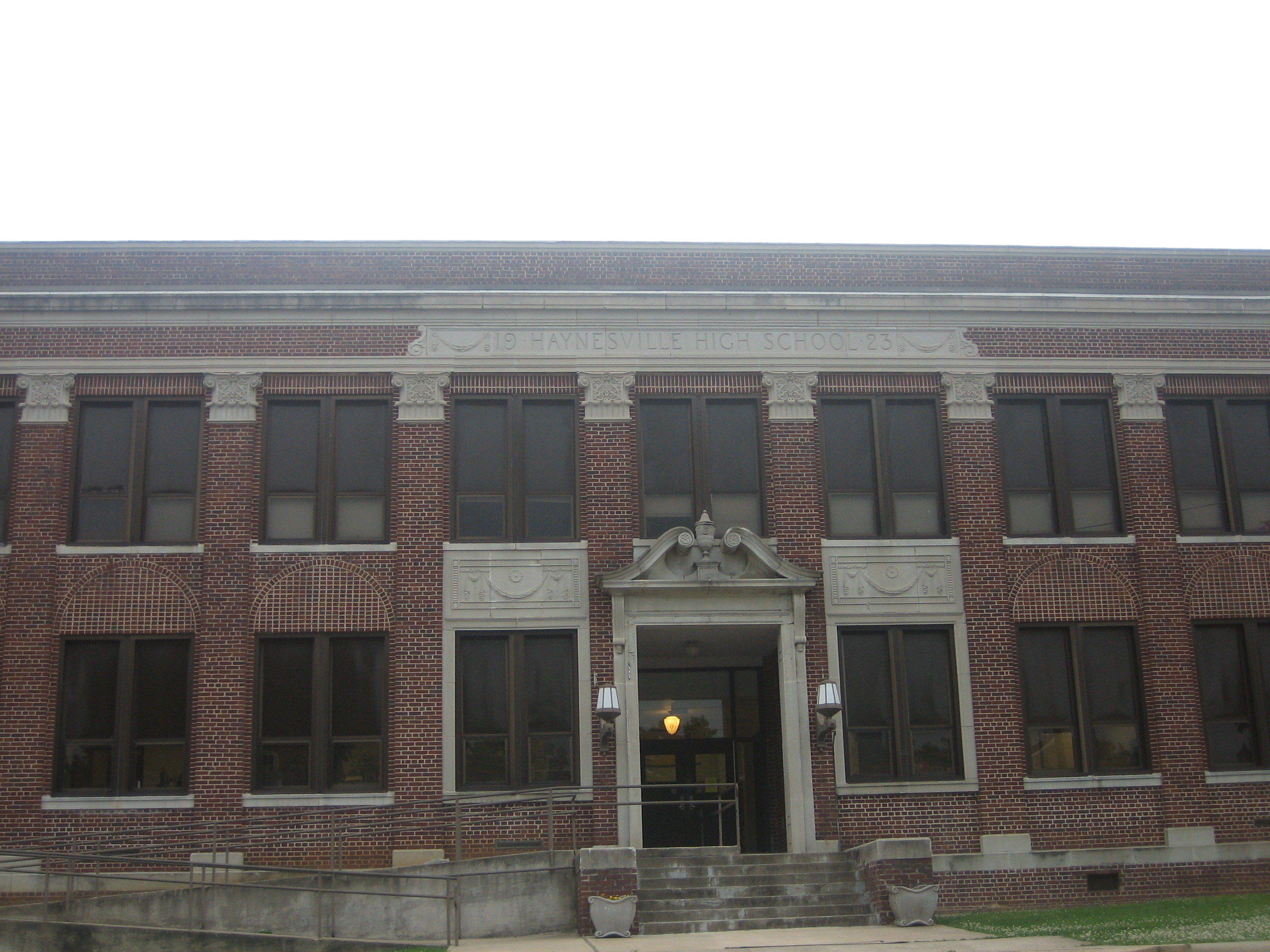
Haynesville Junior-Senior High School

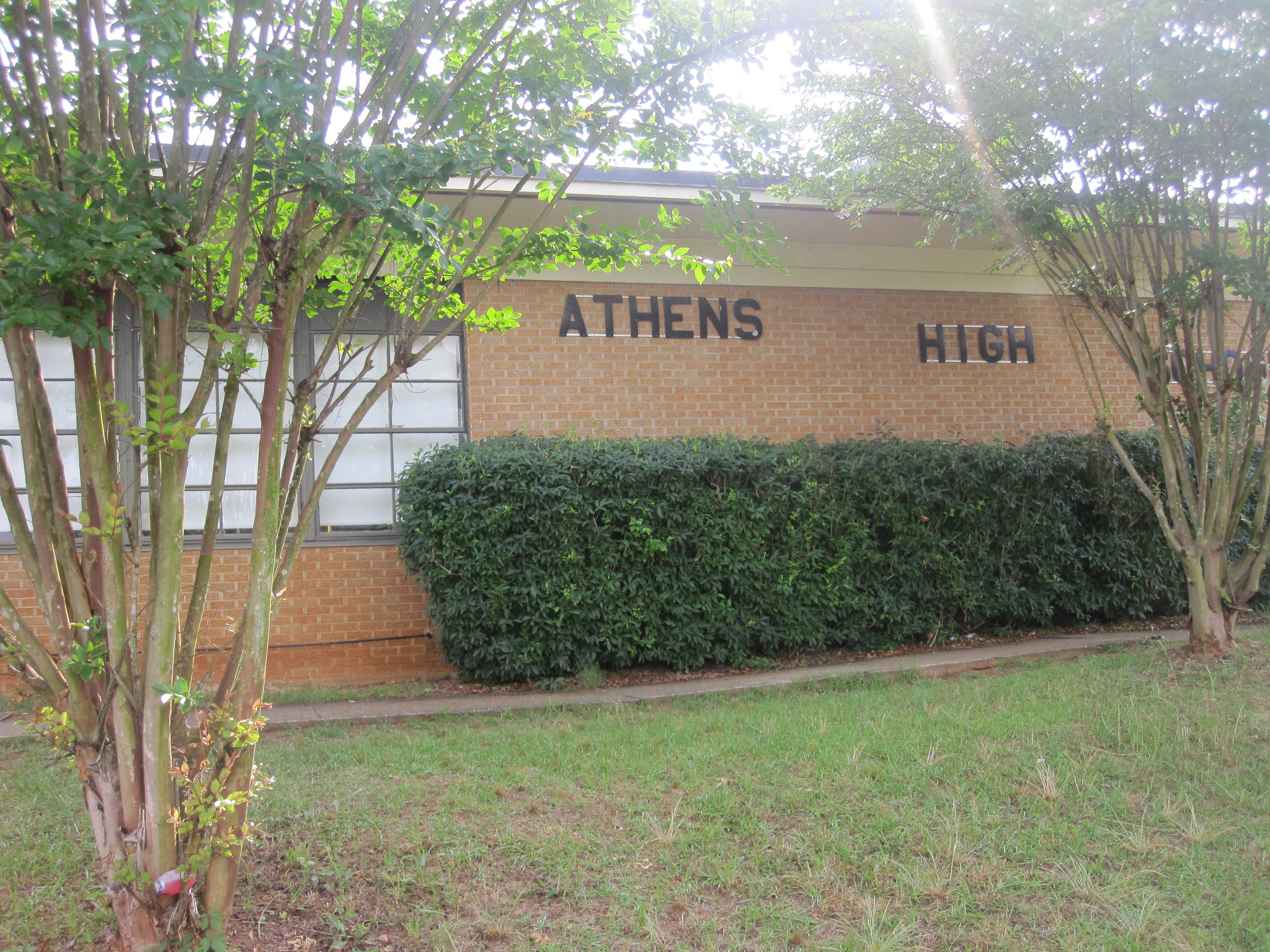
Athens High School (closed 2012)

Claiborne Parish School Board is a school district headquartered in Homer, Louisiana, United States.

The district serves all of Claiborne Parish.

Former Claiborne Superintendent Gary Lee Jones became a Republican member of the Louisiana Board of Elementary and Secondary Education in January 2016.

== History ==
In ???? the district had 2,019 students, a decrease by 102 from the previous year. In ???? the school district had a hiring freeze and planned to remove 60 job positions in order to reduce the district budget by $2.4 million.

== Schools ==
PreK-12 schools

- Summerfield High School (Unincorporated area)

5-12 schools

- Haynesville Junior/Senior High School (Haynesville)

High schools

- Homer High School (Homer)

Junior high schools

- Homer Junior High School (Homer)

Elementary schools

- Homer Elementary School (Homer) - PK-5
- Haynesville Elementary School (Haynesville) - PreK-4

=== Former schools ===
- Athens High School (Athens, formerly in the building housing the private Mt. Olive Christian School)
  - The school had 162 students in February 2012. It closed in summer 2012, with students moved to Homer schools.
