= Summerfield, Louisiana =

Summerfield
- Unincorporated community
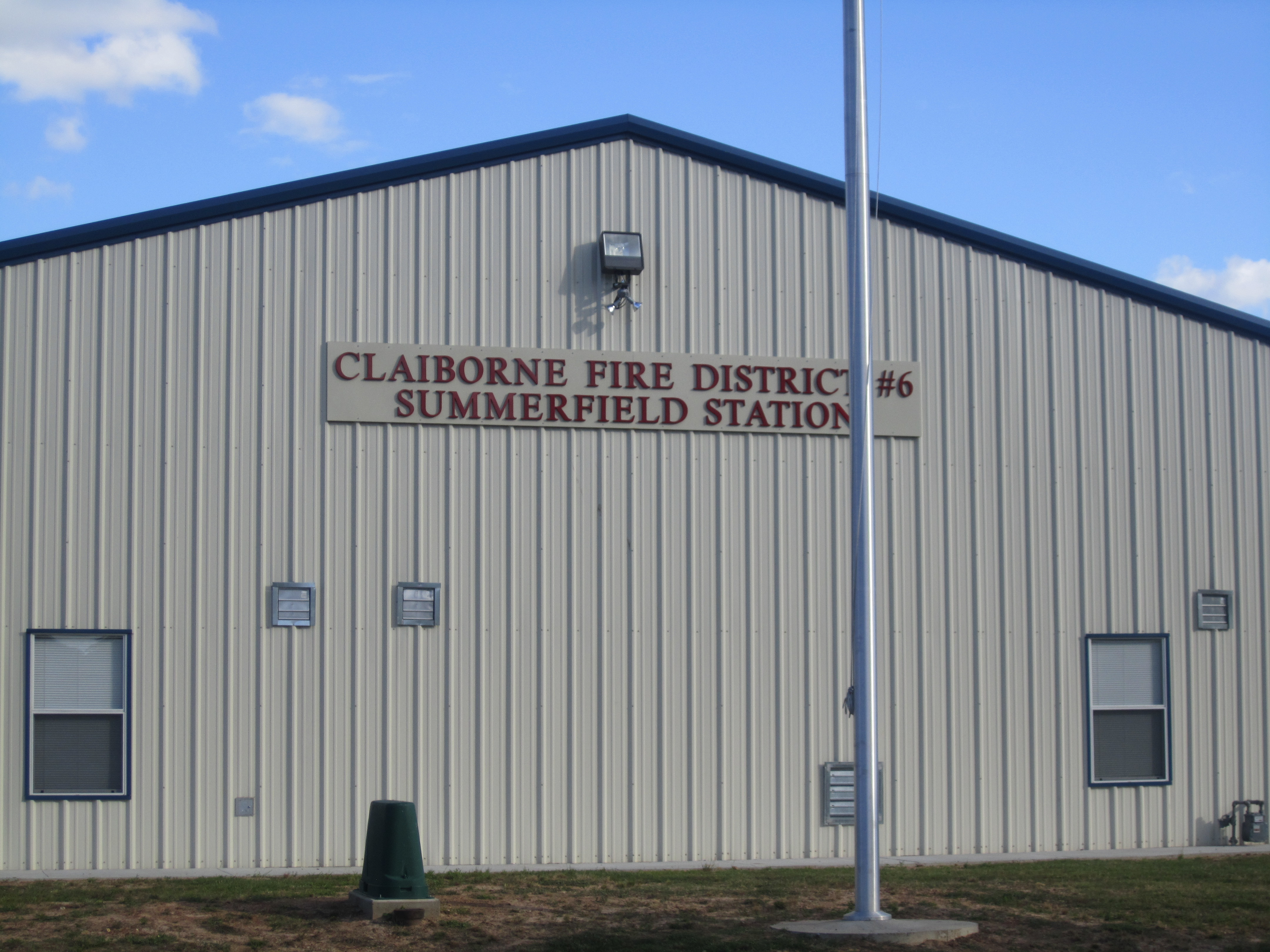
- Claiborne Fire District station in Summerfield

- Location of Summerfield in Louisiana
- Coordinates: 32°54′46″N 92°49′46″W
- Country: United States
- State: Louisiana
- Parish: Claiborne
- Elevation: 230 ft (70 m)
- Time zone: UTC-6 (CST)
  - Summer (DST): UTC-5 (CDT)
- ZIP code: 71079
- Area code: 318
- GNIS feature ID: 548053

Summerfield is an unincorporated community in northeast Claiborne Parish, Louisiana, United States. It is located sixteen miles northeast of the parish seat of Homer.

== History ==
Summerfield was founded in 1868 by W. R. Kennedy.

The community has a Baptist church, founded in 1881, and a Methodist church, founded in 1876.

== Education ==
The Claiborne Parish School Board operates Summerfield High School, a Pre-K–12 high school, in Summerfield.

== Media ==
Summerfield lies in proximity to the Monroe/El Dorado, Arkansas DMA market. Although in the Shreveport market, Monroe channels such as KTVE and KNOE can be received through an over the air antenna. Satellite subscribers receive their media from KTBS and KSLA, the ABC and CBS outlets in Shreveport.

== Infrastructure ==
The United States Postal Service operates the small Summerfield Post Office.

Highways such as LA Hwy 9 and LA Alternate 2 run through Summerfield as well as other rural parish roads.

== Notable people ==
- Demetress Bell, American football player
- Karl Malone, Hall of Fame basketball player and Olympic gold medalist
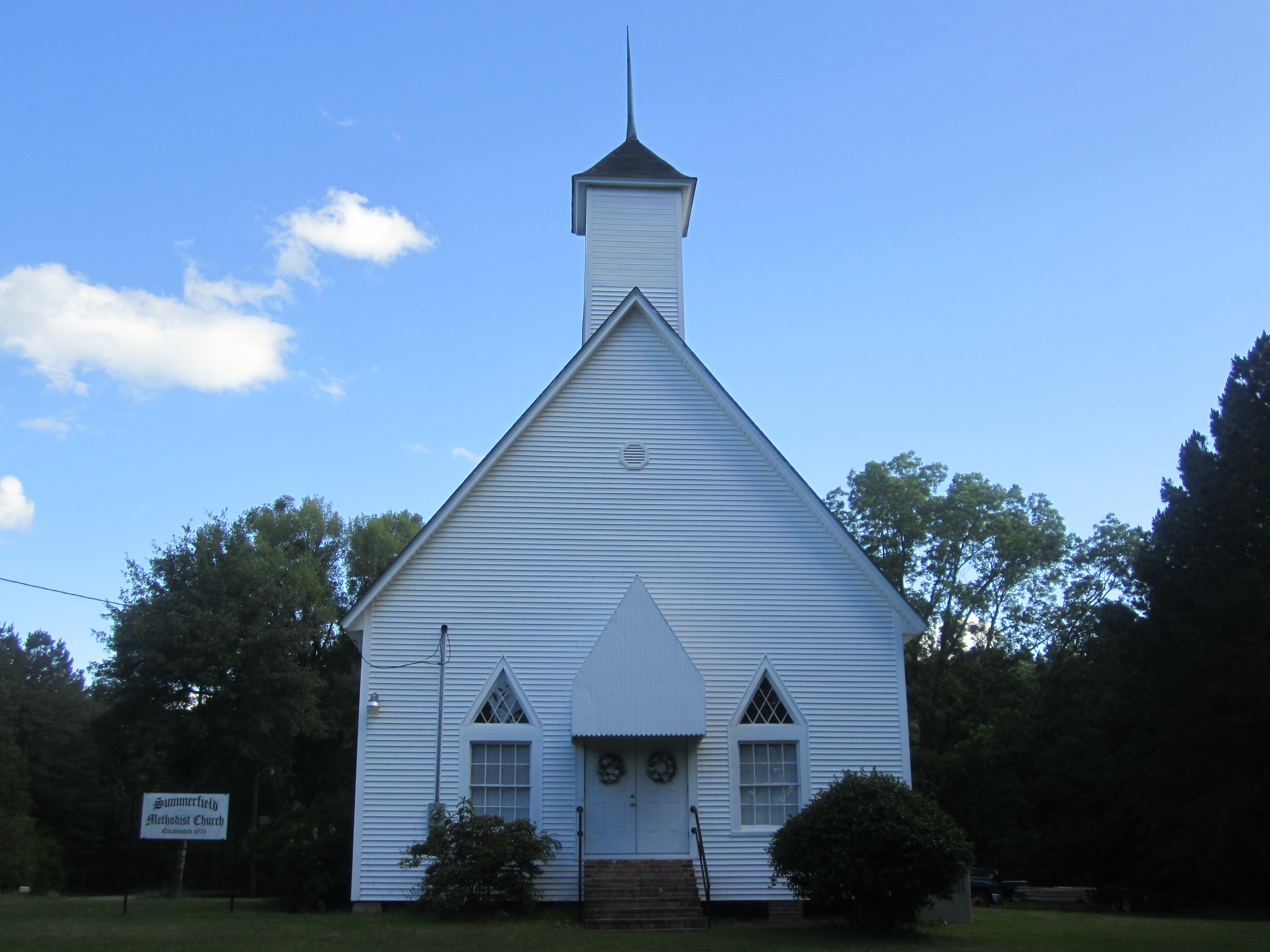
Summerfield Methodist Church

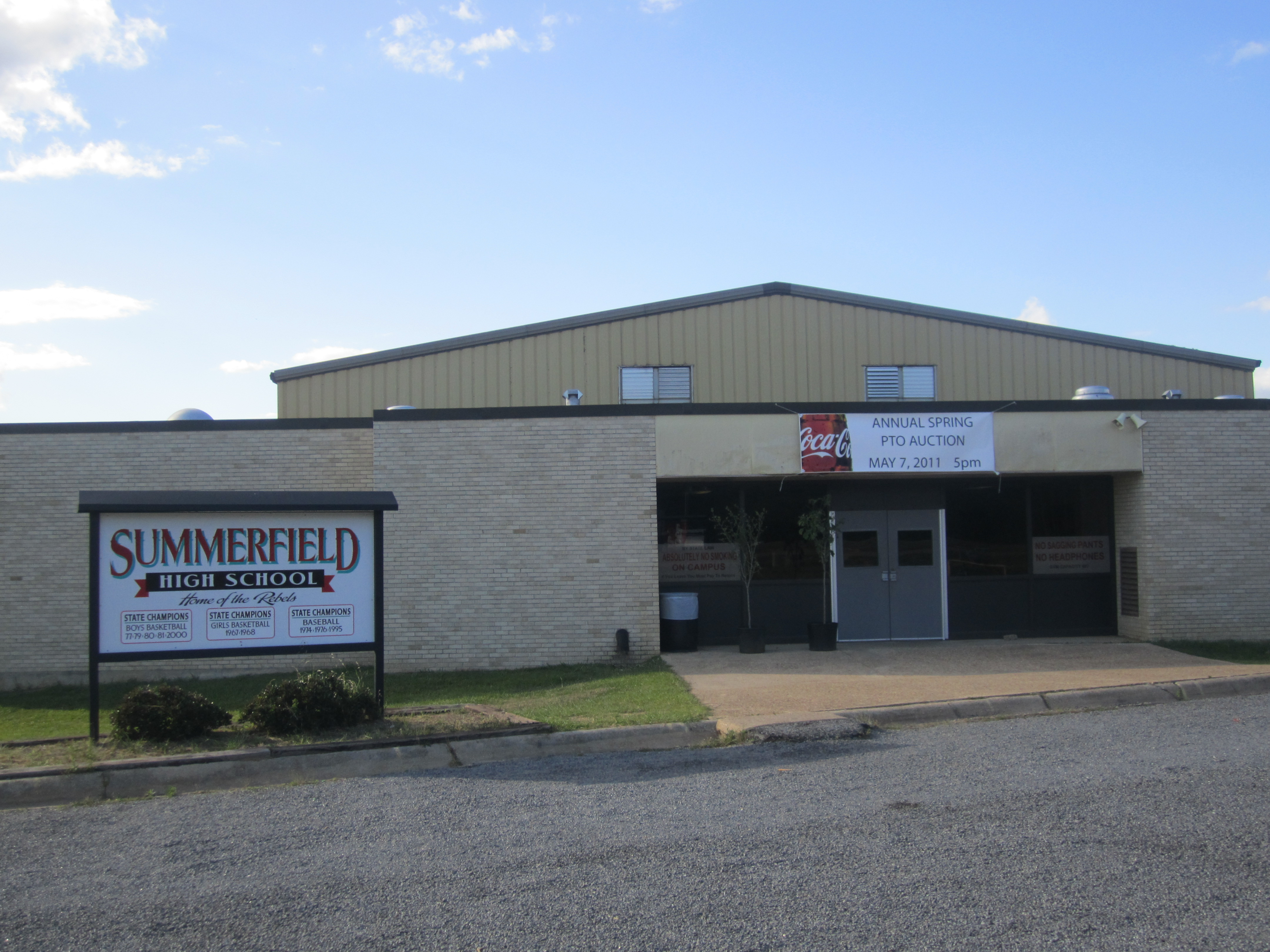
Summerfield High School

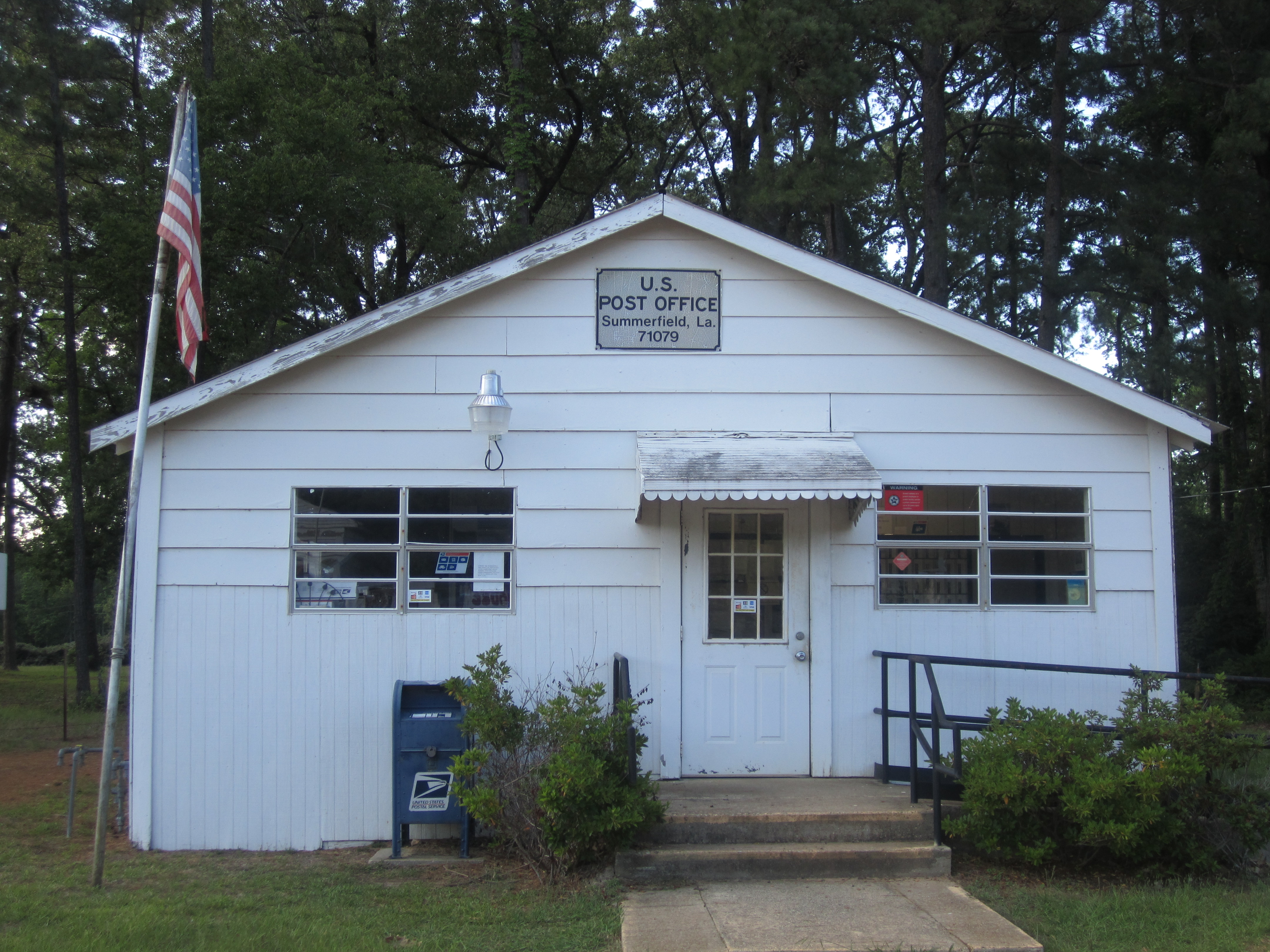
Post Office
