= Tornadoes in Louisiana =

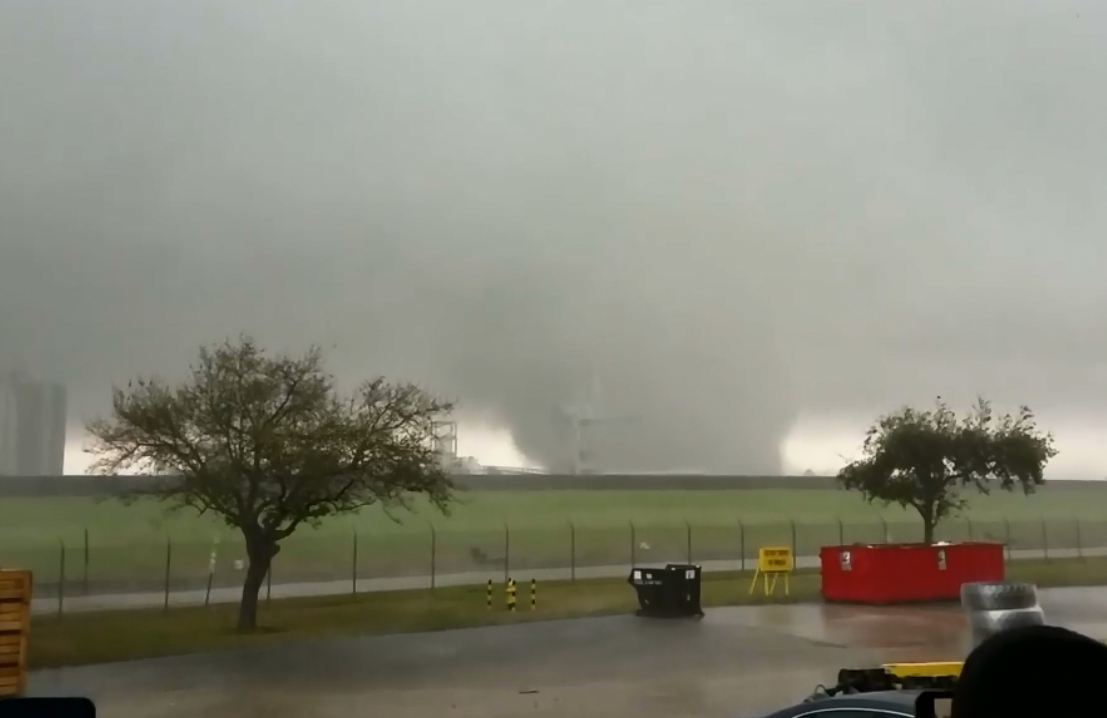
An EF3 tornado in eastern New Orleans on February 7, 2017

The U.S. state of Louisiana experiences several tornadoes per year. There have been at least 2,514 recorded tornadoes since 1950. At least 267 people have been killed and 3,861 others have been injured by these tornadoes. Numerous other tornadoes occurred within the state prior to 1950, but only tornadoes that caused fatalities or were estimated to have been F2 or greater intensity on the Fujita scale were recorded.

The deadliest tornadoes to impact Louisiana mostly took place prior to 1950, before tornado warnings could be issued by forecasters. A total of 1,078 fatalities and 5,079 injuries were recorded during this time period, and all but one of the state's ten deadliest tornadoes had taken place. The three deadliest tornadoes took place in 1908, which impacted Concordia Parish, Amite, and Gilliam. The former two took place during the 1908 Dixie tornado outbreak, the first of which killed 39 people, and the second killed 47 people within the state. The lattermost tornado killed 49 people, making it Louisiana's deadliest tornado on record.

Starting in 1950, forecasters were allowed to issue their own tornado warnings, which led to the amount of tornado-related fatalities significantly decreasing over time. However, several deadly and destructive tornadoes still took place after 1950. In 1964, a deadly tornado produced by Hurricane Hilda killed 22 people and injured 165 others in Larose. The first and only tornado to cause F5-rated damage within the state of Louisiana took place in 1971, which destroyed multiple structures outside of Delhi and killed 11 people within the state. Louisiana's costliest tornadoes took place in 1978 and 2020, the former struck the Shreveport–Bossier City metropolitan area, causing $250 million (1978 USD) in damage and killing two people. The latter tornado struck Monroe and also caused $250 million (2020 USD) in damage.

== Climatology ==
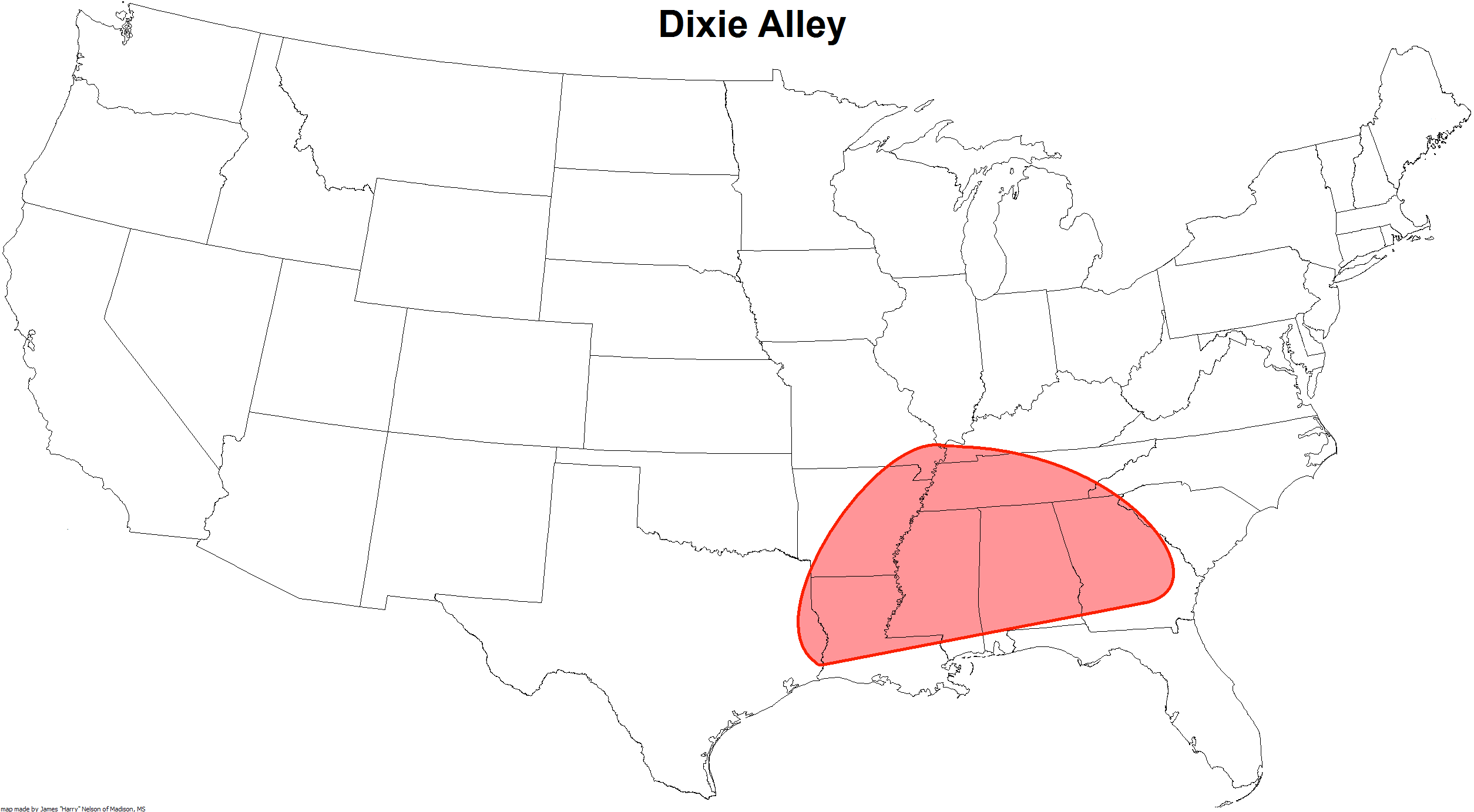
Map of Dixie Alley

Louisiana is located in Dixie Alley, which is an expanse of land stretching from eastern Texas to southwestern North Carolina. Tornadoes occur most frequently during the afternoon and early evening hours in Louisiana, and most activity occurs during the spring months of March through May. However, in the southern part of the state, tornado activity is more likely to remain consistent throughout the year, while reaching a minimum during the summer months of July and August. Due to Dixie Alley's close proximity to the Gulf of Mexico, tornadic storms in that region are often high-precipitation supercells which produce rain-wrapped tornadoes that are difficult to spot, resulting in a higher risk of fatalities. Tornadoes in Dixie Alley are also more likely than those in other regions to occur at night and tend to travel faster, making them more likely to catch people unprepared.

The number of tornadoes that have been recorded within Louisiana is the highest within the 21st century. This is partially due to the fact that overall tornado counts tend to show higher numbers in more recent years, mainly due to improved detection and reporting of weak tornadoes.

Most active tornado years for Louisiana
Year	Max F/EF#	Tornadoes	Deaths
2024	EF3	108	2
2018	EF2	103	1
2017	EF3	97	3
2019	EF3	94	4
1992	F3	87	2
2009	EF2	82	0

== Deadliest tornadoes ==
Ten deadliest Louisiana tornadoes
Date	F/EF#	Deaths	Injuries	Hardest-hit community
May 13, 1908	F4	49	135	Gilliam
The deadliest tornado to impact Louisiana took place on May 13, 1908, in the community of Gilliam. This tornado touched down west of Oil City and moved directly through Gilliam, destroying many of its structures and killing 34 people. The tornado continued northeast and impacted the western side of Bolinger, where more homes sustained severe damage or destruction, and 9 people were killed. It then moved south of the Lela community before lifting just south of the Louisiana-Arkansas state border. This tornado traveled 24.5 miles (39.4 km) and had a peak width of 300 yards (270 m).
April 24, 1908	F4	47	270	Amite, Pine
This destructive tornado was first seen in Weiss just before it killed two people in the Dennis Mills community. The tornado passed near Montpelier, killing two more people, before directly striking the city of Amite, where complete destruction occurred to numerous structures and 29 people were killed. The tornado also severely damaged or destroyed structures near Wilmer, where four people were killed, and within Pine, where nine more people were killed, before crossing into Marion County, Mississippi. In total, at least 143 people were killed and 770 more were injured along the tornado's track across Louisiana and Mississippi, making it the eighth-deadliest tornado in U.S. history.
April 24, 1908	F4	39	150	Concordia Parish
At about 5:00 a.m. CST, this tornado touched down north of Lamourie, and instantly killed three people in Richland. As the tornado continued northeast, four more people were killed in the community of Ruby, and it injured 25 people as it moved between Effie and Center Point in Avoyelles Parish. As the tornado crossed into Concordia Parish, it widened to 700 yards (640 m) and leveled numerous plantations and tenant homes, causing at least 30 fatalities. After impacting Concordia Parish, the tornado crossed into Adams County, Mississippi just north of Natchez. Through the tornado's entire path across Louisiana and Mississippi, at least 91 people were killed and at least 400 people were injured.
May 1, 1933	F4	28	400	Gillark, Minden
At about 4:00 p.m. CST, a violent, large tornado hit Minden, causing more damage than any other Louisiana tornado at that time. The 400-yard-wide (370 m) funnel first impacted Gillark, a community just outside Minden, killing 16 or more people. Homes there were lifted, "blown apart and scattered" aloft, according to tornado researcher Thomas P. Grazulis. In Minden the tornado destroyed or damaged 500 homes, with losses worth $1,250,000 (1933 USD). Dozens of houses were flattened, many of which were swept off their foundations.
October 3, 1964	F4	22	165	Larose
The deadliest tropical cyclone-spawned tornado to impact the United States took place on October 3, 1964, in the city of Larose. This tornado was spawned by an embedded supercell within Hurricane Hilda, and it destroyed numerous homes and vehicles within the city. The tornado killed 22 people, injured 165 others, and caused $2.5 million (1964 USD) in damage. This was only one of two tornadoes that were spawned by a tropical cyclone to reach F4 strength and the deadliest tornado to be produced by such an event since 1900.
February 17, 1938	F4	21	≈40	Rodessa
Forming just outside town, this tornado mangled oil derricks before striking Rodessa, where many homes "vanished", most of which were small and frail, according to a report quoted by Grazulis. The 200-yard-wide (180 m) tornado tore into corrugated metal buildings, ripping them to shreds. It piled up or blew machinery, automobile parts, and shacks miles away. Building debris mutilated victims. Losses totaled $250,000 (1938 USD).
December 31, 1947	F4	18	225	Cotton Valley
This tornado began south of Benton, and caused major damage in much of Cotton Valley, where 100 houses and several businesses were destroyed. An estimated 500 people became homeless following the tornado, and 14 people were killed within the town. Significant damage also took place within Dykesville and Haynesville in Louisiana before lifting north of Three Creeks, Arkansas, traveling a total path length of 59.7 miles (96.1 km) and peaking at a width of 600 yards (550 m).
April 4, 1923	F4	15	150	Pineville
Numerous structures sustained damage from this tornado as it traveled 12.3 miles (19.8 km) across western Alexandria and Pineville, reaching a peak width of 200 yards (180 m). Fifty to sixty houses were damaged or destroyed, and several commercial buildings also sustained devastating damage. The lighting system was also knocked out in the city of Pineville, which made it diffcult to identify the extent of destruction and rescue victims in the tornado's path.
February 17, 1927	F3	14	70	Pleasant Hill
This tornado touched down south of Converse, and it damaged or destroyed 50 homes as it moved south and east of Pleasant Hill. In the areas surrounding the town, 13 people were killed, including seven in one family. A child's body was carried for 1.5 miles (2.4 km) and a car was displaced by 0.5 miles (0.80 km). The tornado traveled a 26-mile (42 km) path and had a peak width of 200 yards (0.18 km) before lifting south of Hanna. Grazulis listed this tornado as a "probable F4."
April 5, 1907	F3	13	100	Jackson
This tornado touched down west of Jackson, and severely damaged numerous tenant homes as it moved north of the town, killing nine people. After moving into East Feliciana Parish, the tornado impacted a lunatic asylum, killing four patients there. The tornado traveled 15.3 miles (24.6 km) in total and had a peak width of 400 yards (370 m) before it lifted north of Clinton.

== Costliest tornadoes ==
Ten costliest Louisiana tornadoes
Date	F/EF#	Damages (in United States dollars)	Hardest-hit community
December 3, 1978	F4	$250 million (1978 USD)	Shreveport, Bossier City
April 12, 2020	EF3	$250 million (2020 USD)	Monroe
December 14, 2022	EF2	$150 million (2022 USD)	Gretna, Arabi
May 2, 1984	F3	$100 million (1984 USD)	Ringgold
October 29, 1974	F3	$50 million (1974 USD)	Estherwood, Crowley
November 15, 1987	F3	$50 million (1987 USD)	Shreveport
April 8, 1993	F2	$50 million (1993 USD)	Grand Isle
April 25, 2019	EF3	$50 million (2019 USD)	Ruston
March 2, 2023	EF1	$50 million (2023 USD)	Shreveport
April 24, 2010	EF4	$36 million (2010 USD)	Tallulah

== Intense tornadoes ==
=== Pre–1925 ===
FU	F0	F1	F2	F3	F4	F5	Total
3	0	1	61	16	5	0	86
Deaths: 817				Injuries: 2,716			

A total of 86 known significant (Note: Defined by Grazulis as receiving a rating of at least F2 or causing a fatality) tornadoes impacted Louisiana before 1925, which killed 817 people and injured 2,716 others. During this time frame, 21 intense tornadoes impacted Louisiana. This was the state's deadliest time frame for tornadoes, with each tornado killing an average of 9.5 people. Five of the state's 10 deadliest tornadoes took place during this period, including its three deadliest tornadoes in Gilliam, Amite, and Concordia Parish, all three of which took place in 1908.

† Deadliest in Louisiana history at time of event
‡ Tornado crossed state lines in or out of Louisiana

Intense (F3+) tornadoes in Louisiana, pre–1925
F#	Date	Deaths	Injuries	Location	Parish	Path length	Max width
F4	May 7, 1840	317 (Note: All recorded fatalities took place in and around Natchez, Mississippi, though it is possible that hundreds of fatalities may have taken place within Louisiana as deaths from enslaved people in the state were not officially recorded.)	109	Deer Park	Concordia	32.9 mi (52.9 km)‡	1000 yd (910 m)
F3	April 22, 1883	4†	30	Esperance Landing	Concordia	79.4 mi (127.8 km)‡	200 yd (180 m)
F3	October 22, 1884	2	10	Garyville	St. Charles	7.8 mi (12.6 km)	200 yd (180 m)
F3	March 23, 1893	7†	30	N of Mangham	Richland	14.7 mi (23.7 km)	800 yd (730 m)
F3	September 7, 1893	4	25	Lockport	Lafourche	5.5 mi (8.9 km)	60 yd (55 m)
F3	February 17, 1894	2	5	S of Haynesville	Claiborne	7.7 mi (12.4 km)	400 yd (370 m)
F3	January 2, 1897	5	21	Mooringsport	Caddo	6 mi (9.7 km)	300 yd (270 m)
F3	October 5, 1906	3	20	Devalls to Slaughter	West Baton Rouge, East Baton Rouge, East Feliciana	20.4 mi (32.8 km)	100 yd (91 m)
F3	October 5, 1906	4	30	Ponchatoula	Tangipahoa	6 mi (9.7 km)	300 yd (270 m)
F3	April 5, 1907	13†	100	Jackson to E of Wilson	West Feliciana, East Feliciana	15.3 mi (24.6 km)	400 yd (370 m)
F4	April 24, 1908	91 (Note: Thirty-nine of these fatalities took place within Louisiana.)	400	N of Lamourie to N of Vidalia	Rapides, Avoyelles, Catahoula, Concordia	122.6 mi (197.3 km)‡	700 yd (640 m)
F4	April 24, 1908	143† (Note: Forty-seven of these fatalities took place within Louisiana.)	770	S of Knapp to Amite to NE of Angie	Pointe Coupee, West Baton Rouge, East Baton Rouge, Livingston, St. Helena, Tangipahoa, Washington	154.9 mi (249.3 km)‡	1000 yd (910 m)
F4	May 13, 1908	49† (Note: As of December 2025, this is the deadliest tornado in Louisiana history.)	135	Gilliam	Caddo, Bossier	24.5 mi (39.4 km)	300 yd (270 m)
F3	February 20, 1912	8	50	Shreveport to Bossier City	Caddo, Bossier	15.2 mi (24.5 km)	200 yd (180 m)
F3	March 13, 1913	9	50	Florien to S of Provencal	Sabine, Natchitoches	23.3 mi (37.5 km)	500 yd (460 m)
F3	March 16, 1919	17 (Note: Five of these fatalities took place within Louisiana.)	50	E of Baskin to S of Twin Oaks	Franklin, Richland, Madison, East Carroll	65 mi (105 km)‡	300 yd (270 m)
F3	December 23, 1921	6	30	Spencer to S of Lake Providence	Union, Morehouse	24.9 mi (40.1 km)	200 yd (180 m)
F3	March 14, 1922	4	30	W of Lobdell	West Baton Rouge, East Baton Rouge	1.8 mi (2.9 km)	100 yd (91 m)
F4	April 4, 1923	15	100	Alexandria to Pineville	Rapides	12.3 mi (19.8 km)	200 yd (180 m)
F3	April 12, 1923	5	25	N of Thibodaux	Lafourche	24.9 mi (40.1 km)	200 yd (180 m)
F3	April 29, 1924	0	5	Crichton	Red River	Unknown	50 yd (46 m)

=== 1925–1949 ===
FU	F0	F1	F2	F3	F4	F5	Total
0	0	1	105	20	6	0	132
Deaths: 261				Injuries: 2,363			

A total of 132 known significant tornadoes impacted Louisiana from 1925 to 1949, which resulted in 261 deaths and 2,363 injuries. Out of these tornadoes, 26 of these were intense, the deadliest of which struck the city of Minden, killing 28 people and injuring 400 others. Several other places were significantly impacted by intense tornadoes during this time period, including Bastrop, Pleasant Hill, Rodessa, Shreveport, and Cotton Valley. The tornadoes which impacted these cities all caused significant loss of life, with each one killing at least 10 people.

‡ Tornado crossed state lines in or out of Louisiana

Intense (F3+) tornadoes in Louisiana, 1925–1949
F#	Date	Deaths	Injuries	Location	Parish	Path length	Max width
F3	May 10, 1926	1	20	S of Ashland	Natchitoches	5.1 mi (8.2 km)	400 yd (370 m)
F3	November 25, 1926	12	38	Bastrop to Mer Rouge	Morehouse	5.3 mi (8.5 km)	100 yd (91 m)
F3	February 17, 1927	14	70	S of Converse to Pleasant Hill to S of Hanna	Sabine, Natchitoches, Red River	26 mi (42 km)	200 yd (180 m)
F3	April 21, 1929	3	20	S of Oak Ridge	Morehouse, Richland	15.2 mi (24.5 km)	150 yd (140 m)
F3	January 24, 1933	0	20	SE of French Settlement to E of Ponchatoula	Livingston, Tangipahoa	29.6 mi (47.6 km)	100 yd (91 m)
F3	March 30, 1933	7	40	Hall Summit	Red River, Bienville	15.5 mi (24.9 km)	900 yd (820 m)
F3	March 31, 1933	3	21	Zachary to W of Greensburg	East Baton Rouge, East Feliciana, St. Helena	27 mi (43 km)	200 yd (180 m)
F4	May 1, 1933	28	400	Minden	Webster	5.9 mi (9.5 km)	400 yd (370 m)
F4	May 1, 1933	6	50	Arcadia	Bienville, Claiborne	5.3 mi (8.5 km)	500 yd (460 m)
F3	May 4, 1933	1	15	Tallulah	Madison	10.2 mi (16.4 km)	500 yd (460 m)
F3	April 6, 1935	14 (Note: All fatalities occurred in Mississippi.)	220	NW of Kentwood	St. Helena, Tangipahoa	35 mi (56 km)‡	300 yd (270 m)
F3	July 2, 1936	2	20	Mangham	Richland, Franklin	10.1 mi (16.3 km)	100 yd (91 m)
F4	February 17, 1938	21	50	Rodessa	Caddo	6.7 mi (10.8 km)‡	200 yd (180 m)
F3	March 29, 1938	4	9	West Ferriday	Concordia	2.7 mi (4.3 km)	75 yd (69 m)
F3	April 5, 1938	0	4	NW of Pine Prairie	Evangeline	5.4 mi (8.7 km)	300 yd (270 m)
F4	April 16, 1939	8	50	Haynesville	Claiborne	4.9 mi (7.9 km)	200 yd (180 m)
F3	March 12, 1940	10	60	Greenwood to Shreveport to Barksdale Air Force Base	Caddo, Bossier	30.4 mi (48.9 km)‡	200 yd (180 m)
F3	March 29, 1940	3	60	W of Paincourtville	Assumption	2.3 mi (3.7 km)	300 yd (270 m)
F4	April 7, 1940	3	100	Amite	Tangipahoa	4.6 mi (7.4 km)	400 yd (370 m)
F3	November 7, 1943	3	20	Maurice	Vermillion	3.2 mi (5.1 km)	500 yd (460 m)
F3	November 14, 1947	0	17	DeRidder	Beauregard	2.7 mi (4.3 km)	60 yd (55 m)
F4	December 31, 1947	18	225	S of Benton to Cotton Valley to Haynesville	Bossier, Webster, Claiborne	59.7 mi (96.1 km)‡	600 yd (550 m)
F3	January 3, 1949	1	7	E of Cotton Valley to E of Gordon	Webster, Claiborne	25.3 mi (40.7 km)	300 yd (270 m)
F3	January 3, 1949	1	14	E of Choudrant to E of Farmerville	Lincoln, Union	20.2 mi (32.5 km)	Unknown
F3	March 24, 1949	7	69	W of Oak Grove	East Carroll	55.6 mi (89.5 km)‡	100 yd (91 m)
F3	May 1, 1949	1	12	S of Homer	Claiborne	Unknown	Unknown

=== 1950–1974 ===
FU	F0	F1	F2	F3	F4	F5	Total
0	81	189	117	40	3	2	432
Deaths: 184				Injuries: 1,863			

Between 1950 and 1974, a total of 432 recorded tornadoes impacted Louisiana, resulting in 184 deaths and 1,863 injuries. Forty-five of these tornadoes were intense, and the deadliest tornado was one produced by a supercell embedded within Hurricane Hilda which struck Larose and resulted in 22 fatalities. Starting in 1950, following the first successful "tornado forecast" for the Tinker Air Force Base tornadoes in Oklahoma two years prior, forecasters were allowed to issue tornado warnings, which helped to significantly decrease tornado casualties. Louisiana's first and only tornado to cause F5-rated damage also took place during this time frame, which was the 1971 Inverness tornado. This tornado struck Delhi and the nearby communities of Waverly and Transylvania, which killed 11 people within the state.

‡ Tornado crossed state lines in or out of Louisiana

Intense (F3+) tornadoes in Louisiana, 1950–1974
F#	Date	Deaths	Injuries	Location	Parish	Path length	Max width
F4	February 12, 1950	8+ (Note: Data from Grazulis; NCEI lists 18 fatalities and 77 injuries.)	70+	N of Stonewall to Barksdale Air Force Base	Caddo, Bossier	≥20 mi (32 km)	100 yd (91 m)
F3	February 12, 1950	5+ (Note: Data from NCEI; Grazulis lists 9 fatalities and 40 injuries.)	25+	Zwolle to Roy to S of Hanna	Sabine, De Soto, Natchitoches, Red River, Bienville	74.5 mi (119.9 km)	100 yd (91 m)
F3	January 6, 1951	0	11	Alexandria to Pollock	Rapides, Grant	16.8 mi (27.0 km)	317 yd (290 m)
F3	March 10, 1952	0	0	E of Stonewall to Homer	De Soto, Caddo, Bossier, Webster, Claiborne	50.9 mi (81.9 km)	650 yd (590 m)
F3	April 4, 1952	0	10	S of Welsh to N of Rayne	Jefferson Davis, Acadia	36.7 mi (59.1 km)	100 yd (91 m)
F3	February 6, 1953	2	21	S of Holden to Hammond	Livingston, Tangipahoa	15.6 mi (25.1 km)	400 yd (370 m)
F3	May 17, 1953	0	17	Rayville to Epps to S of Lake Providence	Richland, West Carroll, East Carroll	41.6 mi (66.9 km)‡	100 yd (91 m)
F4	December 3, 1953	7+ (Note: Data from Grazulis; NCEI lists 9 fatalities.)	50	NE of Fullerton to Alexandria to NE of Ball	Vernon, Rapides, Grant	≥45 mi (72 km)	300 yd (270 m)
F5	December 5, 1953	38 (Note: All fatalities and F5-rated damage occurred when the tornado struck Vicksburg, Mississippi.)	270	Delta	Madison	9 mi (14 km)‡	500 yd (460 m)
F3	January 22, 1957	3	9	N of Haughton	Bossier	1.7 mi (2.7 km)	167 yd (153 m)
F3	March 21, 1957	0	2	N of Chauvin	Terrebonne	2 mi (3.2 km)	100 yd (91 m)
F3	October 15, 1957	1	29	S of Opelousas to N of Dupont	St. Landry, Pointe Coupee	37.9 mi (61.0 km)	100 yd (91 m)
F3	November 7, 1957	0	5	Torras	Pointe Coupee	3.6 mi (5.8 km)	50 yd (46 m)
F3	November 7, 1957	3	16	S of Boyce to Alexandria	Rapides	13.3 mi (21.4 km)	67 yd (61 m)
F3	November 7, 1957	4	10	Cankton	Acadia, St. Landry	9.2 mi (14.8 km)	200 yd (180 m)
F3	September 10, 1961	1	55	Kaplan	Vermillion	5.7 mi (9.2 km)	283 yd (259 m)
F3	September 12, 1961	5	37	Jonesboro	Jackson	2 mi (3.2 km)	400 yd (370 m)
F3	April 24, 1964	0	2	Greenwood to Shreveport to Bossier City	Caddo, Bossier	20.6 mi (33.2 km)	500 yd (460 m)
F4	October 22, 1964	22	165	Larose	Lafourche	1.5 mi (2.4 km)	67 yd (61 m)
F3	February 11, 1965	0	3	W of Keatchie to Barksdale Air Force Base	De Soto, Caddo, Bossier	33 mi (53 km)	117 yd (107 m)
F3	January 28, 1966	0	0	Luling	St. Charles	0.1 mi (0.16 km)	17 yd (16 m)
F3	May 1, 1967	0	2	NW of Oberlin	Allen	5.2 mi (8.4 km)	750 yd (690 m)
F3	February 1, 1968	0	0	S of Monroe	Ouachita	0.5 mi (0.80 km)	100 yd (91 m)
F3	March 11, 1968	0	0	Natchitoches	Natchitoches	1 mi (1.6 km)	100 yd (91 m)
F3	November 27, 1968	0	0	E of Mer Rouge	Morehouse	0.5 mi (0.80 km)	33 yd (30 m)
F3	April 12, 1969	0	1	S of Gonzales to S of French Settlement	Ascension, Livingston	10.7 mi (17.2 km)	100 yd (91 m)
F3	December 25, 1969	1	8	Kaplan	Vermillion	1.5 mi (2.4 km)	100 yd (91 m)
F3	December 25, 1969	0	1	S of Bayou Sorrel to White Castle	Iberville	13.5 mi (21.7 km)	50 yd (46 m)
F3	December 29, 1969	0	2	S of Jonesville to NE of Ferriday	Catahoula, Concordia	29.1 mi (46.8 km)	183 yd (167 m)
F3	March 17, 1970	0	2	Patterson	St. Mary	1 mi (1.6 km)	50 yd (46 m)
F3	April 19, 1970	0	2	SE of Shreveport to S of Taylortown	Caddo, Bossier	6.8 mi (10.9 km)	50 yd (46 m)
F3	February 12, 1971	0	1	Lake Charles	Calcasieu	3.6 mi (5.8 km)	150 yd (140 m)
F5	February 21, 1971	48 (Note: Eleven fatalities occurred in Louisiana.)	510	Delhi to S of Lake Providence	Madison, East Carroll	109.2 mi (175.7 km)‡	500 yd (460 m)
F3	June 22, 1971	0	0	Alexandria International Airport	Rapides	0.1 mi (0.16 km)	17 yd (16 m)
F3	September 16, 1971	0	3	Baton Rouge	East Baton Rouge	7.3 mi (11.7 km)	83 yd (76 m)
F3	February 29, 1972	0	3	E of Erwinville	West Baton Rouge	1 mi (1.6 km)	200 yd (180 m)
F3	January 18, 1973	1	2	N of Cotton Plant to E of Dehlco	Caldwell, Ouachita, Richland	38 mi (61 km)	73 yd (67 m)
F3	April 17, 1973	0	1	W of Vinton	Calcasieu	0.5 mi (0.80 km)	10 yd (9.1 m)
F3	April 17, 1973	0	0	Lake Charles	Calcasieu	0.5 mi (0.80 km)	10 yd (9.1 m)
F3	April 25, 1973	0	0	NE of Baton Rouge	East Baton Rouge	0.3 mi (0.48 km)	70 yd (64 m)
F3	March 20, 1974	1	9	Zwolle to W of Winnfield	Sabine, Natchitoches, Winn	85.2 mi (137.1 km)‡	200 yd (180 m)
F3	March 20, 1974	0	18	Many to Natchitoches	Sabine, Natchitoches, Winn	44.7 mi (71.9 km)‡	77 yd (70 m)
F3	October 29, 1974	2	52	N of Lake Arthur to Estherwood to N of Crowley	Jefferson Davis, Acadia	31.3 mi (50.4 km)	200 yd (180 m)
F3	October 29, 1974	0	1	Lafayette	Lafayette, St. Martin	7.3 mi (11.7 km)	167 yd (153 m)

=== 1975–1999 ===
FU	F0	F1	F2	F3	F4	F5	Total
0	210	446	135	46	4	0	841
Deaths: 35				Injuries: 1,327			

From 1975 to 1999, a total of 841 recorded tornadoes occurred in Louisiana, which caused 35 deaths and 1,327 injuries. During this time period, 50 intense tornadoes took place. Multiple destructive tornadoes impacted the Shreveport–Bossier City area. These included an F4 tornado on December 3, 1978, which killed two people and caused $250 million (1978 USD) in damage, an F3 tornado on November 15, 1987, which killed one person and caused $50 million (1987 USD) in damage, as well as the deadliest tornado to strike the state during this time frame, which was an F4 tornado that killed seven people and caused $8 million (1999 USD) on April 3, 1999. In 1983, two other F4-rated tornadoes caused major damage within the cities of LaPlace and Collinston.

‡ Tornado crossed state lines in or out of Louisiana

Intense (F3+) tornadoes in Louisiana, 1975–1999
F#	Date	Deaths	Injuries	Location	Parish	Path length	Max width
F3	March 20, 1976	0	32	Kilbourne	West Carroll	4.6 mi (7.4 km)‡	50 yd (46 m)
F3	April 21, 1977	1	11	N of Breaux Bridge	St. Martin	3.8 mi (6.1 km)	440 yd (400 m)
F3	April 17, 1978	0	2	N of Saint Joseph	Tensas	20.7 mi (33.3 km)‡	100 yd (91 m)
F4	December 3, 1978	2	266	Shreveport to Bossier City	Caddo, Bossier	8.9 mi (14.3 km)	400 yd (370 m)
F3	December 3, 1978	0	0	N of Eastwood to N of Spearsville	Bossier, Webster, Claiborne, Union	61.1 mi (98.3 km)	10 yd (9.1 m)
F3	December 3, 1978	2	4	NW of Heflin to NE of Spearsville	Webster, Bienville, Claiborne, Union	60 mi (97 km)‡	300 yd (270 m)
F3	October 27, 1980	0	0	E of Pleasant Hill	Sabine, Natchitoches	5.6 mi (9.0 km)	500 yd (460 m)
F3	June 5, 1981	0	10	Alexandria to Pineville	Rapides	4.3 mi (6.9 km)	40 yd (37 m)
F3	April 25, 1982	0	0	Four Forks	Caddo	7 mi (11 km)	200 yd (180 m)
F3	April 25, 1982	0	1	Minden to E of Athens	Webster, Claiborne	23 mi (37 km)	500 yd (460 m)
F3	September 12, 1982	0	0	Clayton	Concordia	2 mi (3.2 km)	133 yd (122 m)
F3	January 31, 1983	1	0	NE of Kaplan	Vermillion	6 mi (9.7 km)	100 yd (91 m)
F3	January 31, 1983	1	2	E of Bunkie	Avoyelles	5 mi (8.0 km)	100 yd (91 m)
F3	February 9, 1983	0	0	NW of Church Point	Acadia	3 mi (4.8 km)	150 yd (140 m)
F3	February 9, 1983	0	7	E of Church Point to Opelousas to E of Port Barre	Acadia, St. Landry	21 mi (34 km)	150 yd (140 m)
F3	March 20, 1983	0	0	NE of Franklinton	Washington	2 mi (3.2 km)	200 yd (180 m)
F4	April 1, 1983	2	20	N of Swartz to Collinston	Ouachita, Morehouse	9 mi (14 km)	1000 yd (910 m)
F3	April 1, 1983	0	0	N of Columbia	Caldwell	6 mi (9.7 km)	250 yd (230 m)
F3	April 1, 1983	0	4	S of Baskin to N of Delhi	Franklin, Richland	21 mi (34 km)	300 yd (270 m)
F3	April 1, 1983	0	0	Waverly	Madison	3 mi (4.8 km)	150 yd (140 m)
F3	April 1, 1983	0	0	N of Tallulah	Madison, East Carroll	4 mi (6.4 km)	150 yd (140 m)
F3	May 18, 1983	0	0	E of Newellton	Tensas	9 mi (14 km)	100 yd (91 m)
F3	May 18, 1983	0	0	Richmond	Madison	5 mi (8.0 km)	100 yd (91 m)
F3	May 19, 1983	0	0	N of Many	Sabine	3 mi (4.8 km)	150 yd (140 m)
F3	May 19, 1983	0	0	Natchitoches	Natchitoches	2 mi (3.2 km)	200 yd (180 m)
F3	May 19, 1983	0	10	S of Goldonna to SE of Winnfield	Natchitoches, Winn	23 mi (37 km)	500 yd (460 m)
F3	May 19, 1983	1	35	Urania to W of Clarks	La Salle, Caldwell	12 mi (19 km)	500 yd (460 m)
F3	May 19, 1983	0	6	NE of Columbia	Caldwell	2 mi (3.2 km)	250 yd (230 m)
F3	May 20, 1983	0	0	SE of Plaucheville	Avoyelles	2 mi (3.2 km)	200 yd (180 m)
F3	May 20, 1983	0	0	W of Holly Beach	Cameron	5 mi (8.0 km)	200 yd (180 m)
F3	November 19, 1983	0	0	E of Bernice	Union	2 mi (3.2 km)	200 yd (180 m)
F3	November 19, 1983	0	0	Delta	Madison	0.5 mi (0.80 km)	100 yd (91 m)
F4	December 6, 1983	0	25	LaPlace	St. John the Baptist	7 mi (11 km)	200 yd (180 m)
F3	May 2, 1984	0	9	W of Stonewall to Bienville	Caddo, De Soto, Bossier, Bienville	61 mi (98 km)	250 yd (230 m)
F3	May 7, 1984	0	0	S of Lake Providence	East Carroll	1 mi (1.6 km)	100 yd (91 m)
F3	May 20, 1984	0	0	Cameron	Cameron	3 mi (4.8 km)	150 yd (140 m)
F3	October 14, 1984	0	0	Zachary to Clinton	East Baton Rouge, East Feliciana	16 mi (26 km)	150 yd (140 m)
F3	April 23, 1985	0	0	E of Ida	Caddo	13 mi (21 km)‡	200 yd (180 m)
F3	November 15, 1987	1	116	W of Longstreet to Shreveport	De Soto, Caddo	48 mi (77 km)‡	500 yd (460 m)
F3	December 21, 1990	0	0	W of Waterproof to NE of St. Joseph	Tensas	18 mi (29 km)	300 yd (270 m)
F3	August 25, 1992	2	32	LaPlace to NW of Reserve	St. John the Baptist	9 mi (14 km)	150 yd (140 m)
F3	November 3, 1992	0	0	SW of Mount Lebanon to Arcadia	Bienville	7 mi (11 km)	300 yd (270 m)
F3	November 21, 1992	0	2	Iowa	Calcasieu, Jefferson Davis	6 mi (9.7 km)	73 yd (67 m)
F3	November 21, 1992	0	6	N of Monterey	Concordia	3 mi (4.8 km)	100 yd (91 m)
F3	November 21, 1992	0	11	SE of Sicily Island to SE of Richmond	Catahoula, Tensas, Madison	38 mi (61 km)	200 yd (180 m)
F3	January 21, 1999	0	0	E of Wisner to NW of Newellton	Franklin, Tensas, Madison	22 mi (35 km)	Unknown
F3	April 3, 1999	0	1	Logansport	De Soto, Natchitoches	5.4 mi (8.7 km)‡	150 yd (140 m)
F4	April 3, 1999	7	102	Shreveport to E of Benton	Caddo, Bossier	20.1 mi (32.3 km)	200 yd (180 m)
F3	April 3, 1999	0	0	Athens	Claiborne	8.5 mi (13.7 km)	200 yd (180 m)
F3	April 3, 1999	0	0	N of Lisbon to S of Junction City	Claiborne	14.5 mi (23.3 km)	600 yd (550 m)

=== 2000–present ===
FU	F0	F1	F2	F3	F4	F5	Total
89	450	555	125	20	2	0	1,241
Deaths: 48				Injuries: 671			

Since 2000, a total of 1,241 recorded tornadoes have impacted Louisiana, which have killed 48 people and injured 671 others. Twenty-two of these tornadoes were intense. Several tornadoes struck highly-populated cities, including two EF3 tornadoes that struck the New Orleans metropolitan area in 2017 and 2022, the latter of which killed two people. On April 12, 2020, the Monroe tornado took place, which caused $250 million (2020 USD) in damage. Another EF3 tornado struck Ruston on April 25, 2019, killing two people and causing $50 million in damage (2019 USD). The 2010 Yazoo City tornado caused EF3-rated damage in areas north of Tallulah on April 24, 2010, before causing devastating damage and killing 10 people in Yazoo City, Mississippi as it traveled along a 149-mile (240 km) path. Another EF4 tornado leveled homes outside of Atlanta on November 29 of the same year.

‡ Tornado crossed state lines in or out of Louisiana

Intense (F3+/EF3+) tornadoes in Louisiana, 2000–present
F#/EF#	Date	Deaths	Injuries	Location	Parish	Path length	Max width
F3	April 23, 2000	0	3	SW of Greenwood to SE of Taylortown	Caddo, Bossier	32.5 mi (52.3 km)	500 yd (460 m)
F3	April 23, 2000	0	0	NE of Pleasant Hill to Campti	De Soto, Red River, Natchitoches	23.4 mi (37.7 km)	200 yd (180 m)
F3	November 24, 2001	3	11	Bastrop to NE of Bonita	Morehouse	30 mi (48 km)‡	880 yd (800 m)
F3	November 23, 2004	1	20	Olla to SE of Columbia	La Salle, Caldwell	15 mi (24 km)	300 yd (270 m)
F3	September 24, 2005	0	3	Clayton to NW of Waterproof	Concordia, Tensas	14 mi (23 km)	100 yd (91 m)
EF3	January 20, 2010	0	0	N of Greenwood	Caddo	15.6 mi (25.1 km)‡	1087 yd (994 m)
EF4	April 24, 2010	10	146	N of Tallulah	Madison	149 mi (240 km)‡	3080 yd (2820 m)
EF4	November 29, 2010	0	0	Atlanta to Winnfield	Winn	14 mi (23 km)	400 yd (370 m)
EF3	May 26, 2011	0	4	E of Sun	St. Tammany	6.1 mi (9.8 km)	150 yd (140 m)
EF3	February 23, 2016	2	75	Paincourtville to NE of Convent	Caddo	7.8 mi (12.6 km)	350 yd (320 m)
EF3	February 7, 2017	0	33	New Orleans	Orleans	10.1 mi (16.3 km)	600 yd (550 m)
EF3	February 7, 2017	0	3	NE of Watson	Livingston	6.4 mi (10.3 km)	350 yd (320 m)
EF3	April 25, 2019	2	2	Ruston	Lincoln	11.2 mi (18.0 km)	1100 yd (1000 m)
EF3	December 16, 2019	1	0	DeRidder to Alexandria to Pineville	Beauregard, Vernon, Rapides	62.6 mi (100.7 km)	550 yd (500 m)
EF3	April 12, 2020	0	0	Monroe	Ouachita	8 mi (13 km)	300 yd (270 m)
EF3	April 12, 2020	0	0	S of Sterlington	Ouachita	2.6 mi (4.2 km)	400 yd (370 m)
EF3	May 17, 2020	1	9	N of Church Point	Acadia, St. Landry	3.9 mi (6.3 km)	100 yd (91 m)
EF3	April 10, 2021	1	7	E of Palmetto	St. Landry	8.7 mi (14.0 km)	200 yd (180 m)
EF3	March 22, 2022	2	2	Arabi	Jefferson, St. Charles, Orleans	11.5 mi (18.5 km)	320 yd (290 m)
EF3	November 29, 2022	0	1	SE of Grayson	Caldwell	8 mi (13 km)	300 yd (270 m)
EF3	December 13, 2022	0	14	Farmerville	Union	9.1 mi (14.6 km)	500 yd (460 m)
EF3	December 28, 2024	0	2	N of Johnson Bayou	Cameron	67.9 mi (109.3 km)‡	880 yd (800 m)

== Sources ==
- National Weather Service. Storm Data Publication (Report). National Centers for Environmental Information – via Storm Events Database.
- Grazulis, Thomas P. (May 1984). Violent Tornado Climatography, 1880–1982. OSTI (Technical report). NUREG. Washington, D.C.: Nuclear Regulatory Commission. OSTI 7099491. CR-3670.
  - — (November 1990). Significant Tornadoes 1880–1989. Vol. 2. St. Johnsbury, Vermont: The Tornado Project of Environmental Films. ISBN 1-879362-02-3.
  - — (July 1993). Significant Tornadoes 1680–1991: A Chronology and Analysis of Events. St. Johnsbury, Vermont: The Tornado Project of Environmental Films. ISBN 1-879362-03-1.
  - — (2001a). The Tornado: Nature's Ultimate Windstorm. Norman, Oklahoma: University of Oklahoma Press. ISBN 978-0-8061-3538-0.
  - — (2001b). F5-F6 Tornadoes. St. Johnsbury, Vermont: The Tornado Project of Environmental Films.
- Cline, I. W. (1908). Written at New Orleans. "Tornadoes in Louisiana, April 24, 1908". Monthly Weather Review. 36 (5). Washington, D.C.: United States Weather Bureau: 131–132. Bibcode:1908MWRv...36..131C. doi:10.1175/1520-0493(1908)36<131b:TILA>2.0.CO;2.
- Selden, W. S. (May 1908). "Tornadoes in Mississippi, April 24, 1908". Monthly Weather Review. 36 (5). U.S. Weather Bureau: 132–3. Bibcode:1908MWRv...36..132B. doi:10.1175/1520-0493(1908)36<132:TIMA>2.0.CO;2.
