= National Register of Historic Places listings in Claiborne Parish, Louisiana =

Location of Claiborne Parish in Louisiana

This is a list of the National Register of Historic Places listings in Claiborne Parish, Louisiana.

This is intended to be a complete list of the properties on the National Register of Historic Places in Claiborne Parish, Louisiana, United States. The locations of National Register properties for which the latitude and longitude coordinates are included below, may be seen in a map.

There are 13 properties listed on the National Register in the parish.

This National Park Service list is complete through NPS recent listings posted December 19, 2025.

== Current listings ==
	Name on the Register	Image	Date listed	Location	City or town	Description
1	Arizona Methodist Church	Arizona Methodist Church	December 22, 1983 (#83003608)	Along Arizona Road (LA 806), about 1.5 miles (2.4 km) south of its junction with LA 2; 32°47′14″N 92°57′28″W	Arizona	
2	J.W. Burnham House	J.W. Burnham House	January 22, 1987 (#86003671)	Along Maddox Road, about 3.5 miles (5.6 km) east of Haynesville; 32°56′59″N 93°04′50″W	Haynesville vicinity	
3	Capers-McKenzie House	Capers-McKenzie House	June 30, 1983 (#83000496)	708 Belmont Street; 32°47′46″N 93°03′25″W	Homer	
4	Claiborne Parish Courthouse	Claiborne Parish Courthouse	October 7, 1981 (#81000291)	Courthouse Square; 32°47′30″N 93°03′18″W	Homer	Also a contributing property to Homer Historic District since its creation on August 28, 1986.
5	Fellowship Rosenwald School Teacher's Home		January 25, 2025 (#100010222)	1138 Fellowship Church Road; 32°57′57″N 92°45′25″W	Lillie vicinity	
6	Friendship CME Church	Friendship CME Church	May 31, 2016 (#16000297)	1055 Friendship Road, about 4.2 miles (6.8 km) north of Lisbon; 32°51′21″N 92°52′36″W	Lisbon vicinity	Focal point of small African-American community of Friendship; built in 1933 after predecessor lost in a tornado.
7	Homer Historic District	Homer Historic District	August 28, 1986 (#86001994)	Roughly bounded by North 2nd Street, East Main Street, South 3rd Street, Fulmer Street Third, West Main Street and West 2nd Street; 32°47′26″N 93°03′18″W	Homer	Includes the Hotel Claiborne
8	Killgore House	Killgore House	May 14, 1987 (#87000731)	About 80 yards (73 m) west of junction of LA 2 and LA 518; 32°47′45″N 92°52′23″W	Lisbon	Also known as Rocky Springs Plantation
9	Monk House	Monk House	August 23, 1991 (#91001081)	Along Parish Road 39, about 8.5 miles (13.7 km) northeast of Homer; 32°53′21″N 92°57′56″W	Homer vicinity	
10	Mt. Sinai Rosenwald School		January 25, 2025 (#100010221)	1800 Parish Road 234; 32°52′37″N 92°48′29″W	Bernice vicinity	
11	Dr. John W. Todd House	Dr. John W. Todd House	January 22, 1987 (#86003683)	306 East 5th Street; 32°47′20″N 93°02′48″W	Homer	
12	Tulip Methodist Church	Tulip Methodist Church	August 13, 1987 (#87001367)	At the junction of Parish Road 177 and Point Pleasant Road, about 3.3 miles (5.3 km) northeast of Athens; 32°40′55″N 92°58′59″W	Athens vicinity	
13	Alberry Wasson Homeplace	Alberry Wasson Homeplace	June 25, 1982 (#82002766)	Along Wasson Road, about 1.2 miles (1.9 km) southwest of Summerfield; 32°53′55″N 92°50′29″W	Summerfield vicinity	

== See also ==
- List of National Historic Landmarks in Louisiana
- National Register of Historic Places listings in Louisiana
