= 1908 Dixie tornado outbreak =

1908 windstorm in the central and southern United States

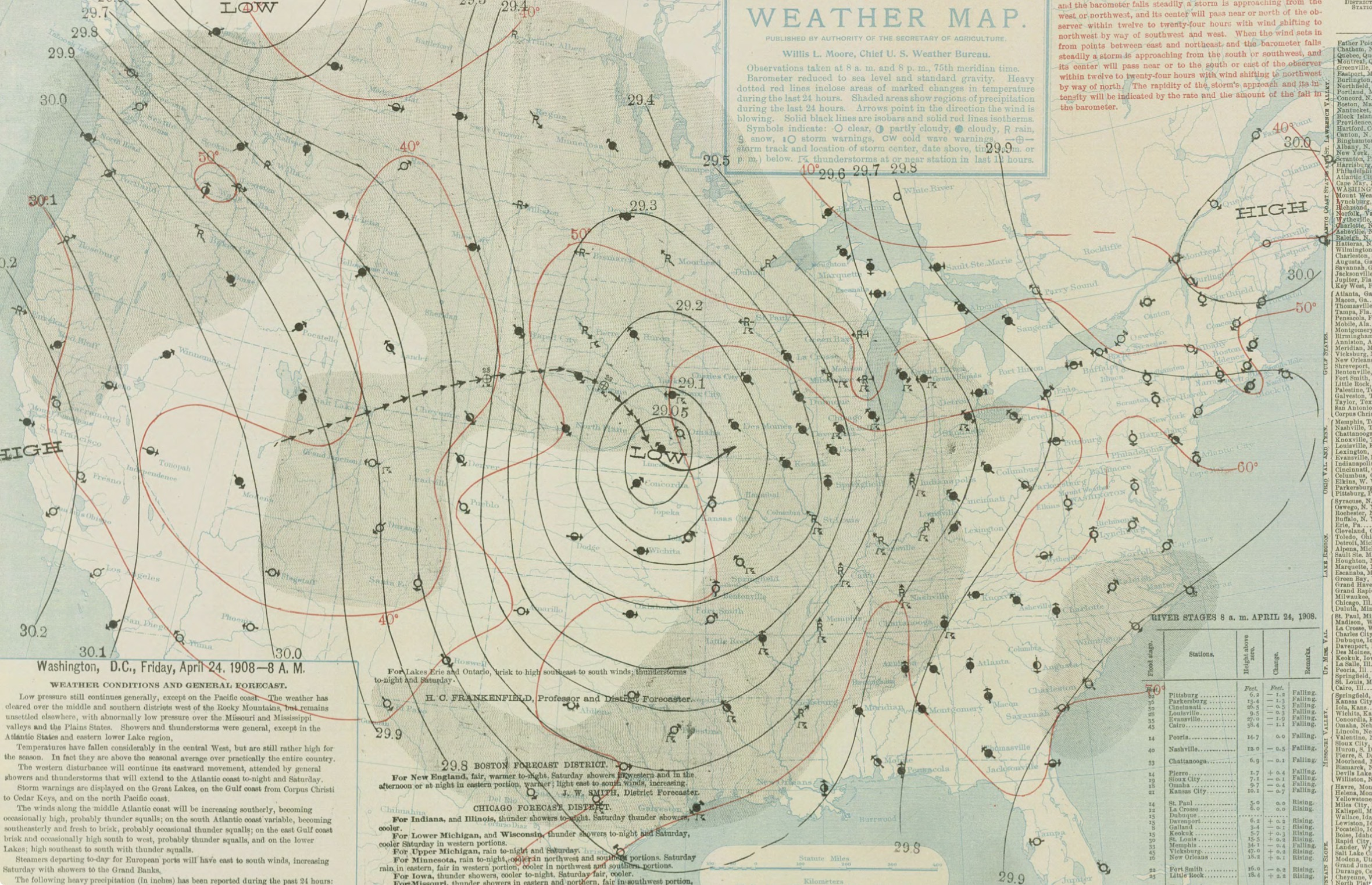
- Map of the low pressure system on April 24, that produced the tornado outbreak

Meteorological history
- Duration: April 23–25, 1908

Tornado outbreak
- Tornadoes: ≥ 31 confirmed
- Max. rating: F5 tornado
- Duration: ≥ 3 days
- Largest hail: 3/4 in (1.9 cm)

Overall effects
- Casualties: ≥ 324 fatalities, ≥ 1,720 injuries
- Damage: (Note: All losses are in 1908 USD unless otherwise noted.)
- Areas affected: Midwestern and Southern United States

On April 23–25, 1908, a destructive tornado outbreak affected portions of the Midwestern and Southern United States, including much of the Great Plains. The outbreak produced at least 31 tornadoes in 13 states, causing a total of at least 324 deaths. Of these deaths, most were caused by three long-tracked, violent tornadoes—each rated F4 on the Fujita scale and considered to be a tornado family—that occurred on April 24. Most of the deaths were in rural areas, many of which were populated by African Americans, and consequently may have been undercounted. One of the tornadoes killed 143 people along its path, 73 of them in the U.S. state of Mississippi, making it the third deadliest tornado in Mississippi history, following the 1936 Tupelo F5 with 216 deaths, and the 1840 Natchez tornado with 317 deaths. (Note: An outbreak is generally defined as a group of at least six tornadoes (the number sometimes varies slightly according to local climatology) with no more than a six-hour gap between individual tornadoes. An outbreak sequence, prior to (after) the start of modern records in 1950, is defined as a period of no more than two (one) consecutive days without at least one significant (F2 or stronger) tornado.) (Note: The Fujita scale was devised under the aegis of scientist T. Theodore Fujita in the early 1970s. Prior to the first use of the Fujita scale in 1971, tornadoes in the United States were officially unrated. While the Fujita scale has been superseded by the Enhanced Fujita scale in the U.S. since February 1, 2007, Canada utilized the old scale until April 1, 2013; nations elsewhere, like the United Kingdom, apply other classifications such as the TORRO scale.) (Note: Historically, the number of tornadoes globally and in the United States was and is likely underrepresented: research by Grazulis on annual tornado activity suggests that, as of 2001, only 53% of yearly U.S. tornadoes were officially recorded. Documentation of tornadoes outside the United States was historically less exhaustive, owing to the lack of monitors in many nations and, in some cases, to internal political controls on public information. Most countries only recorded tornadoes that produced severe damage or loss of life. Significant low biases in U.S. tornado counts likely occurred through the early 1990s, when advanced NEXRAD was first installed and the National Weather Service began comprehensively verifying tornado occurrences.)

== Confirmed tornadoes ==
Confirmed tornadoes by Fujita rating
FU	F0	F1	F2	F3	F4	F5	Total
?	?	?	22	3	5	1	≥ 31

=== April 23 event ===
Confirmed tornadoes – Friday, April 23, 1908 (Note: All dates are based on the local time zone where the tornado touched down; however, all times are in Coordinated Universal Time and dates are split at midnight CST/CDT for consistency.) (Note: Prior to 1994, only the average widths of tornado paths were officially listed.)
F#	Location	County / Parish	State	Time (UTC)	Path length	Max. width	Summary
F2	W of Valley Springs, SD to E of Benclare, SD to MN	Minnehaha (SD), Rock (MN)	SD, MN	18:30–?	5 miles (8.0 km)	Unknown	Possible tornado family struck three farmsteads, destroying stables, tearing roofs off homes, and killing a racehorse.
F2	Oak Grove, TX to OK	Red River (TX), Bowie (TX), McCurtain (OK)	TX, OK	22:15–?	15 miles (24 km)	250 yards (230 m)	Tornado destroyed 10 homes, a school, and a store. Only scattered concrete blocks remained at the school. Tornado crossed into Oklahoma before dissipating. Seven people were injured.
F2	W of Foreman to S of DeQueen	Little River, Sevier	AR	22:30–?	11 miles (18 km)	Unknown	3 deaths — Tornado destroyed a home, killing a family of three. Leaves and twigs rained from the sky in DeQueen.
F2	W of Inwood	Lyon	IA	22:30–?	10 miles (16 km)	100 yards (91 m)	Tornado killed more than 100 head of livestock, including 81 hogs and several sheep. Tornado damaged or destroyed several barns and a school as well. One person was injured.
F2	Clifton to Cayote	Bosque	TX	23:30–?	10 miles (16 km)	Unknown	Tornado damaged or destroyed two homes and several other structures. Tornado tossed water 500 ft (150 m) high as it crossed the Bosque River. Trees along the river were thrown 1/2 mi (0.80 km) away. 10 people were injured.
F5	SW of Pender to S of Thurston	Cuming, Thurston	NE	00:00–?	15 miles (24 km)	400 yards (370 m)	3 deaths — Tornado devastated several farms, one of which it obliterated, including a well-constructed multi-story farmhouse. Shingles and a picture from one of the farms rained from the sky in the town of Goodwin, 35 mi (56 km) away. 10 people were injured.
F4	Deport to W of Fulbright	Lamar, Red River	TX	00:00–?	10 miles (16 km)	300 yards (270 m)	1 death — Tornado destroyed the business district, 25 homes, a pair of churches, and a cottonseed oil mill in Deport. Debris from homes was found 2 mi (3.2 km) away. Six people were injured and losses totaled $125,000.
F3	S of Rice	Navarro	TX	00:30–?	7 miles (11 km)	150 yards (140 m)	3+ deaths — 1/2-mile-wide (0.80 km) tornado struck a farm, destroying the manager's house, 14 tenant houses, and all barns on the property. Several other farmhouses were damaged or destroyed along the path. Six people were injured. Tornado may have continued into Wood County and caused four additional fatalities.
F2	SE of Daingerfield	Morris	TX	03:00–?	10 miles (16 km)	100 yards (91 m)	Tornado destroyed or damaged 17 homes, including four farmhouses. Five people were injured.
F2	Hector	Pope	AR	Unknown	Unknown	Unknown	3 deaths — Tornado damaged or destroyed the entire town, injuring 20 people.

=== April 24 event ===
Confirmed tornadoes – Saturday, April 24, 1908
F#	Location	County / Parish	State	Time (UTC)	Path length	Max. width	Summary
F2	Southern Walls	DeSoto	MS	08:30–?	7 miles (11 km)	Unknown	Tornado destroyed a store, a depot, and three homes. A station agent was injured and losses totaled $1,500.
F2	Mason	Fayette, Tipton	TN	09:00–?	3 miles (4.8 km)	Unknown	Tornado destroyed three churches and a few homes.
F2	Buntyn	Shelby	TN	09:00–?	5 miles (8.0 km)	400 yards (370 m)	Tornado destroyed or unroofed 12 homes. 15 people were injured.
F4	N of Lamourie, LA to Tillman, MS	Rapides (LA), Avoyelles (LA), Catahoula (LA), Concordia (LA), Adams (MS), Jefferson (MS), Claiborne (MS)	LA, MS	11:00–?	105 miles (169 km)	700 yards (640 m)	91 deaths — See section on this tornado
F2	Northern Braxton	Simpson	MS	15:15–?	Unknown	Unknown	Tornado destroyed several homes. 10 people were injured and losses totaled $10,000.
F2	N of Wahalak to S of Shuqualak	Kemper, Noxubee	MS	17:45–?	10 miles (16 km)	Unknown	3 deaths — Tornado swept away three small homes. 10 people were injured and losses totaled at least $5,000.
F4	Weiss, LA to Amite, LA/Purvis, MS to SW of Richton, MS	Livingston (LA), St. Helena (LA), Tangipahoa (LA), Washington (LA), Marion (MS), Lamar (MS), Forrest (MS), Perry (MS), Wayne (MS)	LA, MS	17:45–?	155 miles (249 km)	3,520 yards (3,220 m)	143 deaths — See section on this tornado
F4	SW of Dora to Southern Albertville to Northern Sylvania	Walker, Jefferson, Blount, Marshall, DeKalb	AL	20:40–22:15	> 105 miles (169 km)	500 yards (460 m)	35 deaths — See section on this tornado
F2	N of Brooklyn to S of Janet	Forrest, Perry, Greene	MS	20:45–?	25 miles (40 km)	Unknown	5+ deaths — Tornado may have caused as many as seven fatalities. 20 people were injured and losses totaled $290,500.
F2	Thomasboro to Rantoul	Champaign	IL	23:30–?	6 miles (9.7 km)	30 yards (27 m)	Tornado unroofed several homes.
F4	Bluffton, AL to Cave Spring, GA	Cherokee (AL), Polk (GA), Floyd (GA)	AL, GA	01:10–?	16 miles (26 km)	400 yards (370 m)	11 deaths — Tornado leveled many small homes and damaged other structures. Bodies were found 1/4 mi (0.40 km) away. 50 people were injured.
F2	Fort Deposit	Lowndes	AL	03:00–?	5 miles (8.0 km)	250 yards (230 m)	2 deaths — Tornado destroyed 50 structures. 22 people were injured and losses totaled $80,000.
F3	E of Cleveland to Climer	Bradley	TN	03:00–?	10 miles (16 km)	400 yards (370 m)	1 death — Tornado struck 20 farms and damaged or destroyed numerous structures, including five homes. Eight people were injured.
F2	NE of Montgomery	Montgomery, Elmore	AL	03:10–?	4 miles (6.4 km)	Unknown	Tornado destroyed a small building and a barn. Losses totaled $3,000.

=== April 25 event ===
Confirmed tornadoes – Sunday, April 25, 1908
F#	Location	County / Parish	State	Time (UTC)	Path length	Max. width	Summary
F2	Southern Atlanta	Fulton	GA	05:00–?	Unknown	50 yards (46 m)	One home shifted on its foundation and another was torn in half.
F3	Pine Mountain to S of Greenville	Harris, Meriwether	GA	06:00–?	15 miles (24 km)	150 yards (140 m)	10 deaths — Tornado destroyed 40 homes, four churches, and a hotel. 40 people were injured and losses totaled $200,000.
F2	N of Columbus	Muscogee	GA	06:30–?	2 miles (3.2 km)	200 yards (180 m)	2 deaths — Tornado destroyed several homes. 12 people were injured and losses totaled $30,000.
F2	W of Griffin to S of McDonough	Spalding, Henry	GA	07:30–?	15 miles (24 km)	200 yards (180 m)	8 deaths — Tornado struck several frail homes at a mill. 100 people were injured and losses totaled $140,000.
F2	Poulan	Worth	GA	11:00–?	Unknown	100 yards (91 m)	Tornado destroyed or damaged several homes and barns. Four people were injured.
F2	Chickamauga and Chattanooga National Military Park	Walker	GA	18:30–?	3 miles (4.8 km)	100 yards (91 m)	Tornado severely damaged the historic monument, then called Chickamauga National Historic Park, downing at least 100 large trees, some of which it hurled 300 yd (900 ft; 0.17 mi; 0.27 km) through the air. Tornado also destroyed three historic homes.
F2	Diamond	Gilmer	GA	20:00–?	3 miles (4.8 km)	200 yards (180 m)	Tornado unroofed and destroyed several homes. Five people were injured.

=== Concordia Parish, Louisiana/Pine Ridge–Church Hill, Mississippi ===
Concordia Parish, Louisiana/Pine Ridge–Church Hill, Mississippi
F4 tornado
- on the Fujita scale

Overall effects
- Casualties: ≥ 91 fatalities, ≥ 400 injuries
- Damage: $182,000 (1908 USD) $6.52 million (2025 USD)

The first of two major, long-tracked, violent tornadoes first began at about 5:00 a.m. CST just north of Lamourie. Upon touching down, the tornado immediately killed three people at Richland and then four more at Ruby soon after touching down. As it crossed into Avoyelles Parish, it caused 25 injuries between the communities of Effie and Center Point. Farther along the path, two more people were killed near New Era. Upon crossing into Concordia Parish, the tornado rapidly widened to 700 yd (640 m) or more and intensified, destroying numerous large plantations. At least 30 people died in Concordia Parish as many tenant homes were completely leveled. The massive tornado then crossed into Mississippi just north of Vidalia, Louisiana, and Natchez, Mississippi, devastating many more plantations, killing at least 30 more people, and injuring about 200, especially near Pine Ridge. Large antebellum mansions were destroyed, and witnesses reported that areas along the Mississippi River resembled a "deserted battlefield". The tornado then struck the Church Hill area, killing 21 people in frail tenant homes before dissipating near Tillman. At least 400 people were injured along the path, though the actual total, as in other tornadoes this day, was likely higher as most newspapers in the South failed to list Black dead and injured, many of whom were poor sharecroppers.

=== Amite–Pine, Louisiana/Purvis–Richton, Mississippi ===
Amite–Pine, Louisiana/Purvis–Richton, Mississippi
F4 tornado
- on the Fujita scale

Overall effects
- Casualties: ≥ 143 fatalities, ≥ 770 injuries
- Damage: $1.157 million (1908 USD) $41.5 million (2025 USD)

The second of the two long-tracked F4s was one of the deadliest tornadoes in U.S. history. An exceptionally large and intense tornado, it first began at about 11:45 a.m. CST in Weiss, just north of Denham Springs. Two people were killed at Dennis Mills near the beginning of the path. Two others were killed near Montpelier as well. The tornado then struck Amite directly, carving a path of destruction 2 mi (3.2 km) wide through the town. Many structures were completely destroyed in Amite, and 29 people were killed. Four others were killed near Wilmer, along with nine additional fatalities occurring near Pine. The tornado crossed into Mississippi, killing two before tearing through Purvis and devastating most of the town. Only seven of the town's 150 buildings were left standing, and 55 people were killed. Five other fatalities were documented in rural areas outside Purvis as well. Four railroad crew workers were killed farther along the path near McCallum, located 8 mi (13 km) to the south of Hattiesburg, as they tried to seek shelter in a boxcar. The boxcars were thrown 150 ft (46 m) and torn apart by the tornado. Several other fatalities occurred near Richton before the tornado dissipated. At least 770 people were injured along the entire path, though the real total was likely higher, perhaps significantly so, as many minor injuries were probably ignored—an omission still common in contemporary tornado disasters. With at least 143 deaths, the Amite–Purvis tornado is officially the eighth deadliest in U.S. history, though its long path may have actually consisted of two or more tornadoes.

=== Bergens–Southern Albertville–Northern Sylvania, Alabama ===
Bergens–Southern Albertville–Northern Sylvania, Alabama
F4 tornado
- on the Fujita scale

Overall effects
- Casualties: 35 fatalities, 188 injuries
- Damage: > $500,000 (1908 USD) > $17.9 million (2025 USD)

A destructive tornado first began at about 2:40 p.m. CST in southeast Walker County, Alabama, though its actual genesis may have occurred earlier. It first touched down somewhere southwest of Dora and moved northeast, whence it was seen to merge with a "black cloud," possibly another tornado which was then moving east and dissipating. Quickly intensifying and widening to about 1,000 yd (910 m), the tornado grew to F4 intensity and struck the nearby village of Bergens. According to reports, the damage swath on the west side of the tornado briefly shrank as it neared Bergens, causing nearby residents of Dora to believe that a row of hills had deflected the winds from their town. In Bergens, the tornado completely destroyed most of the homes and "leveled" the village church and the store. Of the 42 homes in Bergens, only one remained undamaged, and most of them were destroyed. A nearby depot in Bergens was also destroyed and three of 10 boxcars sitting empty on the railroad were overturned; heavy boxcar parts were reportedly carried 100 ft (30 m) away. Six people in Bergens died instantly and two more later expired of their injuries; of the 16 remaining injured, at least four more died to make the final death toll 12 at Bergens.

Farther along the path, the tornado destroyed numerous homes in the village of Old Democrat, located 4 mi (6.4 km) northeast of Dora, killing two more people there. Next, the "coal-black" funnel struck Warrior and the town of Wynnville, killing two people each at both locations. Turning to the north-northeast, the tornado then crossed into Marshall County and struck Albertville, destroying half the town. An oil tank weighing 9 t (20,000 lb) was carried 1/2 mi (2,600 ft; 880 yd; 800 m) at this location, and a train was overturned and destroyed. At least 15 people died in Albertville and 150 were injured. The tornado continued through heavily forested areas along the remainder of its path, possibly dissipating and reforming into a new tornado. It passed through Ten Broeck and the northern edge of Sylvania before ending, having traveled at least 105 mi (169 km) and possibly as long as 125 mi (201 km) within one hour and 35 minutes. Although the tornado killed 35 people, it only injured 188, likely due to the low population of the area impacted.

== See also ==
- List of North American tornadoes and tornado outbreaks
- April 1924 tornado outbreak – Produced a deadly F3 tornado in Pine Mountain
- 2008 Atlanta tornado outbreak – Produced an EF2 tornado in Downtown Atlanta

== Sources ==
- Chaffee, F. P. (May 1908). "Tornadoes in Alabama, April 24 and 30, 1908". Monthly Weather Review. 36 (5). Washington, D.C.: United States Weather Bureau: 133–134. Bibcode:1908MWRv...36..133C. doi:10.1175/1520-0493(1908)36<133:tiaaa>2.0.co;2.
- Cline, I. W. (1908). "Tornadoes in Louisiana, April 24, 1908". Monthly Weather Review. 36 (5). Washington, D.C.: United States Weather Bureau: 131–132. Bibcode:1908MWRv...36..131C. doi:10.1175/1520-0493(1908)36<131b:TILA>2.0.CO;2.
- Grazulis, Thomas P. (July 1993). Significant Tornadoes 1680–1991: A Chronology and Analysis of Events. St. Johnsbury, Vermont: The Tornado Project of Environmental Films. ISBN 1-879362-03-1.
- Grazulis, Thomas P. (2001a). The Tornado: Nature's Ultimate Windstorm. Norman, Oklahoma: University of Oklahoma Press. ISBN 978-0-8061-3538-0.
- Grazulis, Thomas P. (2001b). F5-F6 Tornadoes. St. Johnsbury, Vermont: The Tornado Project of Environmental Films.
- Lehman, W. F. (May 1908). "Tornado at Dora and Bergens, Ala., April 24, 1908". Monthly Weather Review. 36 (5). Washington, D.C.: United States Weather Bureau: 134. Bibcode:1908MWRv...36..134L. doi:10.1175/1520-0493(1908)36<134:TADABA>2.0.CO;2.
- Selden, W. S. (May 1908). "Tornadoes in Mississippi, April 24, 1908". Monthly Weather Review. 36 (5). U.S. Weather Bureau: 132–3. Bibcode:1908MWRv...36..132B. doi:10.1175/1520-0493(1908)36<132:TIMA>2.0.CO;2.
