= Todd House =

Todd House or Todd Farm or Todd Farmhouse or variations may refer to:

- Todd House (Plantersville, Alabama), listed on the NRHP in Alabama
- Charles S. Todd House, Tucson, AZ, listed on the NRHP in Arizona
- Orrin Todd House, Hamden, CT, listed on the NRHP in Connecticut
- Todd House (Tabor, Iowa), listed on the NRHP in Iowa
- Todd-Montgomery Houses, Danville, KY, listed on the NRHP in Kentucky
- Robert Todd Summer Home, Frankfort, KY, listed on the NRHP in Kentucky
- Mary Todd Lincoln House, Lexington, KY, listed on the NRHP in Kentucky
- William Lytle Todd House, Lexington, KY, listed on the NRHP in Kentucky
- Porter–Todd House, Louisville, KY, listed on the NRHP in Kentucky
- Charles and Letitia Shelby Todd House, Shelbyville, KY, listed on the NRHP in Kentucky
- Dr. John W. Todd House, Homer, LA, listed on the NRHP in Louisiana
- Todd House (Eastport, Maine), listed on the NRHP in Maine
- Todd Farmhouse (Fort Howard, Maryland), listed on the NRHP in Maryland
- Edwin Todd House, Owosso, MI, listed on the NRHP in Michigan
- MacDonald–Todd House, Hastings, MN, listed on the NRHP in Minnesota
- Hiram Charles Todd House, Saratoga Springs, NY, listed on the NRHP in New York
- John Todd House, Hummelstown, PA, listed on the NRHP in Pennsylvania
- Dolley Todd House, Walnut Street, Philadelphia, Pennsylvania, home of Dolley Todd Madison
- Todd Farm (North Smithfield, Rhode Island), listed on the NRHP in Rhode Island
- Irby-Henderson-Todd House, Laurens, South Carolina, listed on the NRHP in South Carolina
- Gibson-Todd House, Charles Town, West Virginia, listed on the NRHP in West Virginia
