= Edith Killgore Kirkpatrick =

American educator and politician

Member of the Louisiana Board of Regents for Higher Education
- In office 1977–1989

Personal details
- Born: Edith Aurelia Killgore; November 14, 1918 Lisbon, Louisiana
- Died: April 15, 2014 (aged 95) Baton Rouge, Louisiana
- Party: Democratic
- Spouse: Claude Kirkpatrick (1917–1997; married 1938–his death)

Edith Aurelia Killgore Kirkpatrick (November 14, 1918 – April 15, 2014) was an American music educator and politician who served on the Louisiana Board of Regents for Higher Education from 1977 to 1989.

== Biography ==
Born in Lisbon, Louisiana, (Note: Her family plantation, the Killgore House, is certified by the National Register of Historic Places.) she studied at Louisiana College (where she graduated as the Class of 1938 Valedictorian and with a Bachelor of Arts), Juilliard School, and Louisiana State University and was a music teacher at McNeese State University and a Baptist choir director.

She was appointed to the newly created Louisiana Board of Regents by Governor Edwin Washington Edwards and served until 1990.

She had four children with her husband, state representative Claude Kirkpatrick. Their daughter-in-law, Sandra Futrell, is the daughter of the Mayor of Pineville, Louisiana, P. Elmo Futrell Jr. She published a songbook, Louisiana Let's Sing, during her husband's 1963 gubernatorial campaign.

Her alma mater, LSU, awarded Kirkpatrick a Distinguished Alumni Award and an honorary doctorate, and along with LSU offers an endowed music professorship named after her.

She died on April 18, 2014.
