= Friendship CME Church =

Methodist church in Lisbon, Louisiana

- U.S. National Register of Historic Places
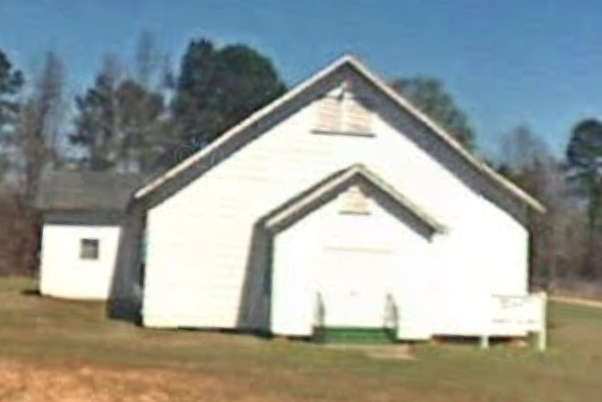

- Location within Louisiana Location within the United States
- Location: 1055 Friendship Road, about 4.2 miles (6.8 km) north of Lisbon, Louisiana
- Coordinates: 32°51′21″N 92°52′36″W
- Area: 1.3 acres (0.53 ha)
- Built: 1933
- NRHP reference No.: 16000297
- Added to NRHP: May 31, 2016

The Friendship CME Church is a Christian Methodist Episcopal church which is the focal point of a small African-American community of Friendship in Lisbon, Louisiana. It was built in 1933 after the previous church was lost in a tornado.

The church was one of two regular meeting places for the local civil rights organization, the Claiborne Parish Civic League, which met there during 1965 to 1973. It was the home church of Frederick Douglass Lewis, the league's president. The NRHP nomination document notes that "plans affecting growth and change in Claiborne Parish were envisioned, created, and put forth during the sessions held at the church."

The church was added to the National Register of Historic Places on May 31, 2016.

== See also ==
- Arizona Methodist Church: also NRHP-listed in Claiborne Parish
- Tulip Methodist Church: also NRHP-listed in Claiborne Parish
- National Register of Historic Places listings in Claiborne Parish, Louisiana
