= Arizona Methodist Church =

Historic church in Louisiana, United States

- U.S. National Register of Historic Places
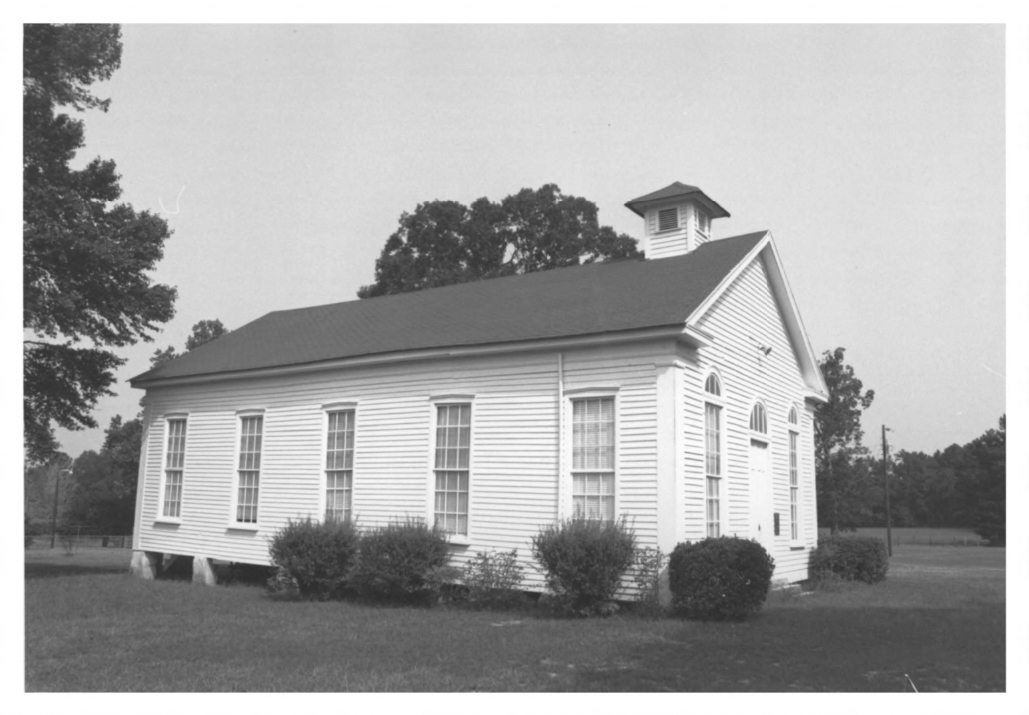

- Location within Louisiana Location within the United States
- Location: Along Arizona Road (LA 806), about 1.5 miles (2.4 km) south of its junction with LA 2
- Nearest city: Arizona, Louisiana
- Coordinates: 32°47′14″N 92°57′28″W
- Area: less than one acre
- Built: c.1880
- Built by: Doss Pennington
- Architectural style: Vernacular Greek Revival, other
- NRHP reference No.: 83003608
- Added to NRHP: December 22, 1983

Arizona Methodist Church is a historic church located along Arizona Road (LA 806), about 1.5 miles (2.4 km) south of its junction with LA 2.

Also known as Arizona United Methodist Church, it was built in about 1880 and added to the National Register in 1983.

As of 1983, it was "the only surviving historic landmark of the Arizona community, which during the postbellum period was a thriving town with a substantial cotton mill and academy."

== See also ==
- Friendship CME Church: also NRHP-listed in Claiborne Parish
- Tulip Methodist Church: also NRHP-listed in Claiborne Parish
- National Register of Historic Places listings in Claiborne Parish, Louisiana
