= Tulip Methodist Church =

Historic church in Louisiana, United States

- U.S. National Register of Historic Places
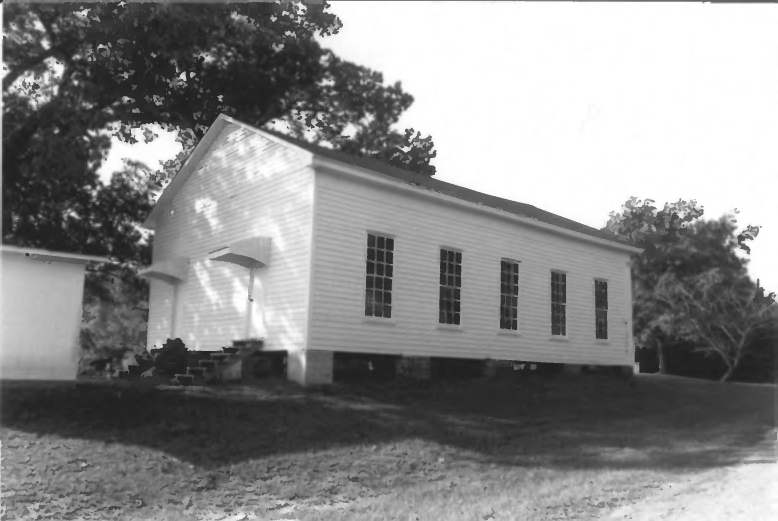

- Location within Louisiana Location within the United States
- Location: At the junction of Parish Road 177 and Point Pleasant Road, about 3.3 miles (5.3 km) northeast of Athens
- Nearest city: Athens, Louisiana
- Coordinates: 32°40′55″N 92°58′59″W
- Area: 0.2 acres (0.081 ha)
- Built: 1872
- Architectural style: Greek Revival
- NRHP reference No.: 87001367
- Added to NRHP: August 13, 1987

Tulip Methodist Church is a historic church, with a cemetery, in Claiborne Parish, Louisiana, near Athens.

The church was organized in 1872 when the Pisgah Methodist Church split. Its building was built in the summer of 1872.

It was added to the National Register of Historic Places in 1987. It was deemed to be a "superior example" of Greek Revival-styled churches in northwestern Louisiana.

The church building "is styled to resemble a simplified Greek temple". Its front is pedimented, has a full entablature, and has corner pilasters.

In 1983 there were no longer regular church services at the church, but an annual "Tulip Memorial Day" was held and there were occasional other events.

== See also ==
- Arizona Methodist Church: also NRHP-listed in Claiborne Parish
- Friendship CME Church: also NRHP-listed in Claiborne Parish
- National Register of Historic Places listings in Claiborne Parish, Louisiana
