= J.W. Burnham House =

Historic house in Louisiana, United States

- J. W. Burnham House
- U.S. National Register of Historic Places
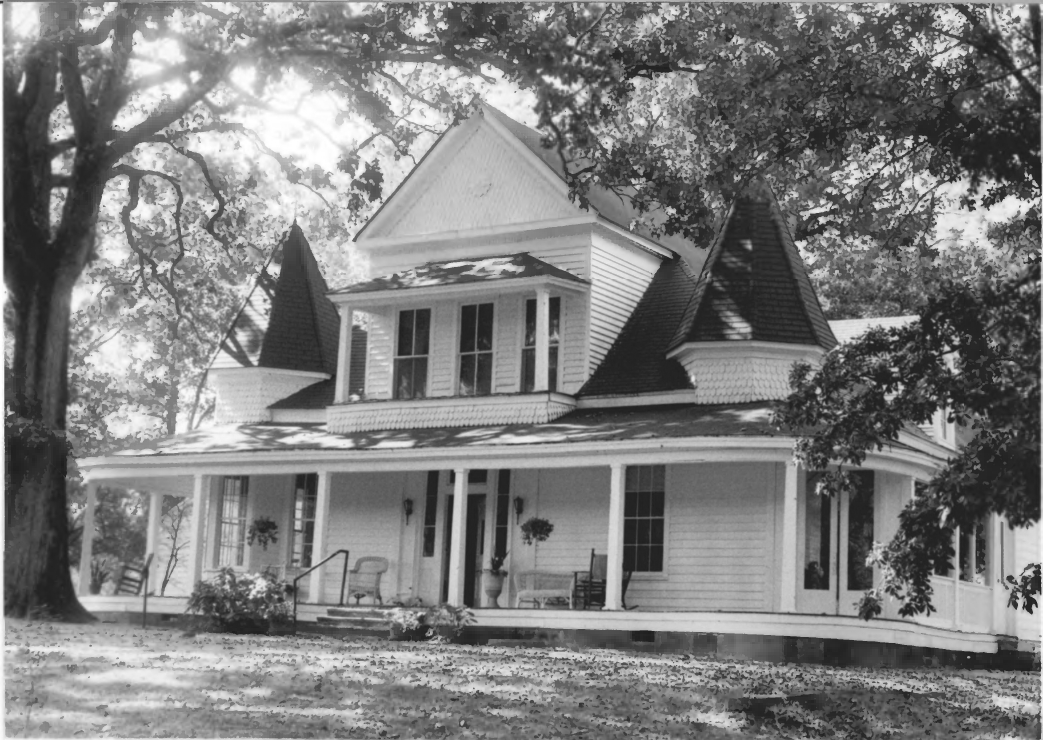

- Location within Louisiana
- Location: Along Maddox Road, about 3.5 miles (5.6 km) east of Haynesville
- Nearest city: Haynesville, Louisiana
- Coordinates: 32°56′59″N 93°04′50″W
- Area: 1 acre (0.40 ha)
- Built: 1890
- Built by: J. W. Burnham
- Architectural style: Queen Anne
- NRHP reference No.: 86003671
- Added to NRHP: January 22, 1987

The J.W. Burnham House is a historic house near Haynesville, Louisiana. It has been listed on the National Register of Historic Places since January 22, 1987.

The house was built in 1890 and was modified in about 1900 to add elements of Queen Anne architecture. The modifications included enlarging the attic, adding two octagonal corner towers, and adding a wraparound porch.

The house was further modified in 1935, in the 1940s and in 1985. It was once the center of a complex including a "Burnham, Louisiana" post office, a saw mill, and more.

== See also ==
- Monk House: also NRHP-listed in Claiborne Parish
- National Register of Historic Places listings in Claiborne Parish, Louisiana
