= 1938 Rodessa tornado =

1938 F4 tornado in Louisiana, US

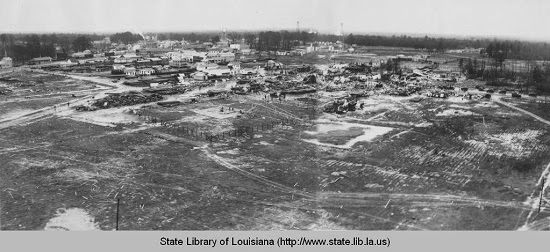
- Aerial view of Rodessa after the disaster.

Meteorological history
- Formed: February 17, 1938, 9:45 p.m. CST (UTC−06:00)
- Dissipated: February 17, 1938, 9:47 p.m. CST (UTC−06:00)
- Duration: 2 minutes

F4 tornado
- on the Fujita scale
- Highest winds: 250 mph (400 km/h)

Overall effects
- Fatalities: 21 fatalities, 24+ injured
- Damage: $250,000 in 1938: $5.7 million in 2026
- Areas affected: Rodessa, Louisiana

The Rodessa tornado was a destructive tornado that hit the village of Rodessa, Louisiana on February 17, 1938. This F4 tornado left 21 people dead and upwards of 24 people injured. Making it the sixth deadliest tornado in state history, just behind the 1964 Larose tornado.

== Meteorological synopsis & Tornado summary ==
The rural location of the event has left a lot of the facts up for speculation. Despite this, it is believed that the tornado began forming five miles northeast of the town near the border of Caddo Parish and Miller County, Arkansas. Moving south, the tornado passed the village of Ida to the west before touching down and suddenly changing direction. Moving towards Rodessa, the tornado toppled multiple oil derricks before striking the town from the east at 9:45 p.m. The tornado destroyed the entire southeastern portion of the town or what was once known as "Supply House Row", knocking over power lines and leaving an estimated 200 yard path of decimation in its wake. It is stated that the tornado only lasted two minutes, but was followed by heavy rains that would impede the search for victims amongst the rubble. Despite the damage to power lines, the telephone lines were fully operational and residents began phoning nearby villages for assistance.

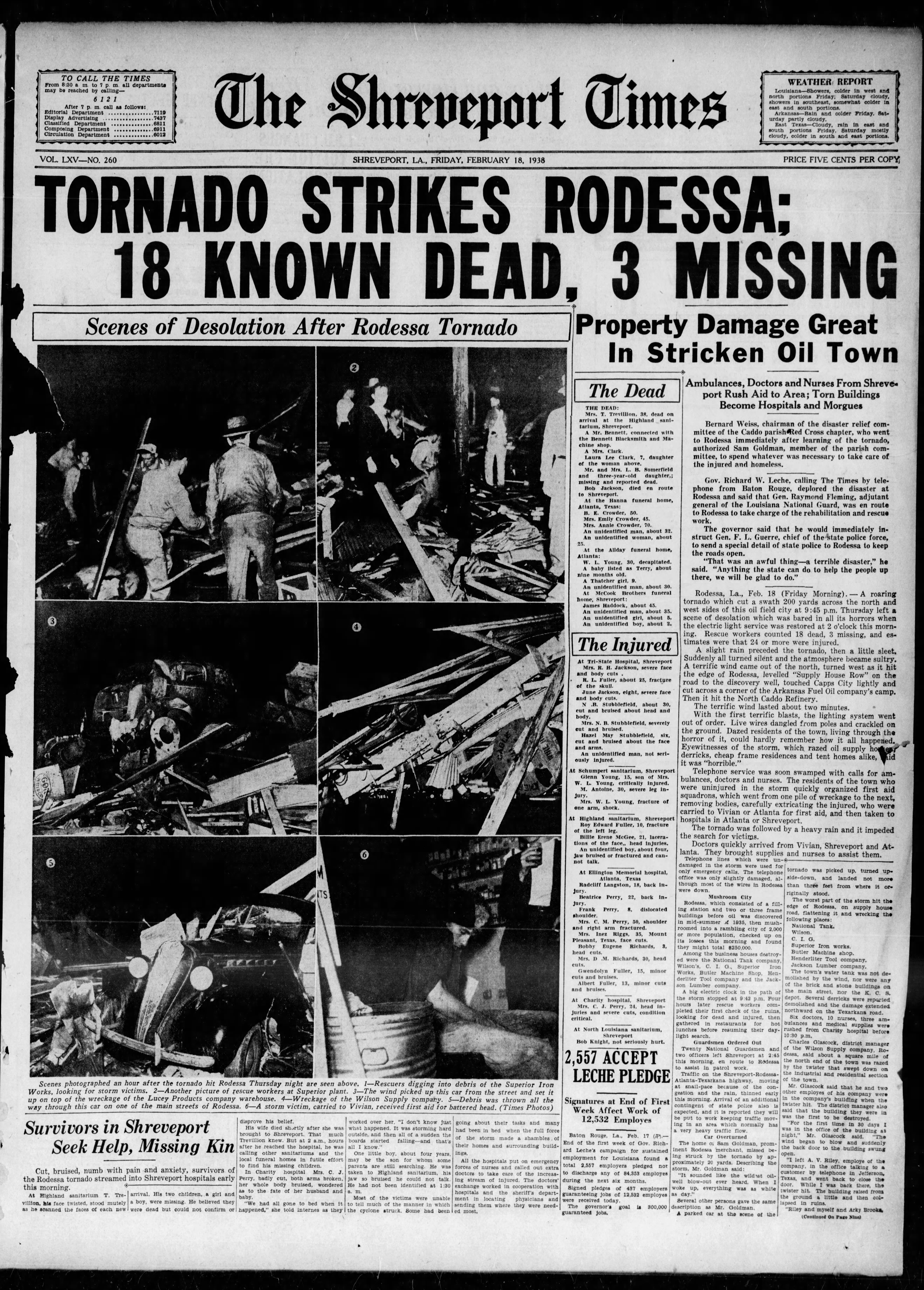
Front page of the Shreveport Times the morning after the tornado.

== Aftermath ==
Immediately following the event, residents began carrying the injured to nearby settlements including Vivian to the south and Atlanta, Texas to the northwest for medical care. By 10:30 p.m. 16 medical staff in three ambulances were sent from the Charity Hospital in Shreveport. By 2:00 a.m. on February 18, the power was restored. It is thought around this time that then Governor of Louisiana Richard W. Leche was informed of the situation in Baton Rouge. He was known to have said to the Shreveport Times "That was an awful thing―a terrible disaster. Anything the state can do to help the people up there, we will be glad to do". At 2:45 a.m. twenty national guardsmen were sent to assist with patrol work in conjunction with local and state police.

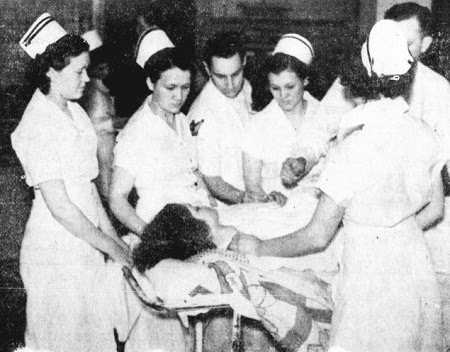
Mrs. C. J. Perry was the first person to be returned to Shreveport for emergency treatment.

Later into the morning and the subsequent days the true destruction of the tornado was revealed. Multiple homes and businesses were flattened, with one car being picked up and thrown on top of the wreckage. A doctor from Vivian named Edgar Galloway said that some of the dead were so disfigured that identification would be difficult. It is thought that the final death toll was 21 ±1-2 people with the number of injuries being less certain. The Shreveport Times claims that the injury count following the event was 24, while other sources state that the number was as high as 60. These numbers were likely worsened by the weak infrastructure of the town as it was observed that the pieces of sheet metal that made up many homes played a role in much of the disfigurments. Many trees around and within the town were additionally debarked or uprooted entirely.
