= Monk House =

- U.S. National Register of Historic Places
- Location within Louisiana
- Nearest city: Homer, Louisiana
- Coordinates: 32°53′21″N 92°57′5″W
- Area: less than one acre
- Built: 1855
- Architectural style: Greek Revival
- NRHP reference No.: 91001081
- Added to NRHP: August 23, 1991

The Monk House, in Claiborne Parish, Louisiana near Homer, Louisiana, was built in 1855.

It was a home of Alabama native Merrell Monk, who moved his family to Claiborne Parish in the early 1850s. It was built by slave labor and may have been "patterned after the plans of his wife's former home in Opelika, Alabama." It is Greek Revival in style; Greek Revival features noted in its National Register nomination are:

- "a five bay front gallery whose simple Doric pillars and matching corner pilasters support an entablature. Another pillared gallery with entablature outlines the rear elevation of the house and ell.
- transoms and sidelights flanking the front and rear entrances. Some of the antique glass within the transoms and sidelights has survived.
- facade window surrounds composed of engaged fluted pilasters whose molded Doric capitals are incorporated into a cornice surmounted by a narrow architrave.
- interior door surrounds which mimic those framing the facade's windows, except that the engaged pilasters are smooth rather than fluted.
- tall two panel doors, one of which shows evidence of faux bois painting.
- several plain vernacular Greek Revival mantels."

It is located along Parish Road 39 (also known as Richardson Loop), about 8.5 miles (13.7 km) northeast of Homer, somewhat to the north of Louisiana State Highway 9.

It was listed on the National Register of Historic Places in 1991.

== See also ==
- J.W. Burnham House: also NRHP-listed in Claiborne Parish
- National Register of Historic Places listings in Claiborne Parish, Louisiana
