= Hanna, Louisiana =

Unincorporated community in Louisiana, U.S.

Coordinates: 31°57′41″N 93°20′52″W

Hanna is a rural unincorporated community in Red River Parish, Louisiana, United States.

== Tower ==
- KRRP-AM Tower
