= Killgore House =

- U.S. National Register of Historic Places
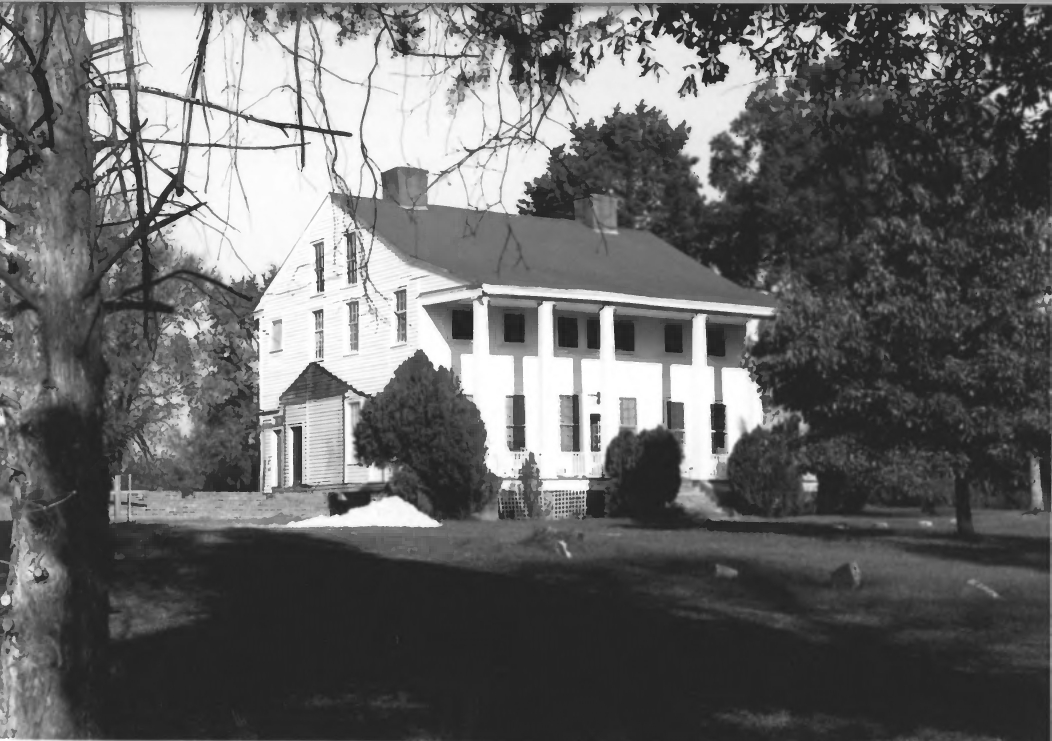
- Killgore House in October 1986

- Location within Louisiana
- Location: Jct. of LA 2 and LA 518, Lisbon, Louisiana
- Coordinates: 32°47′44″N 92°52′19″W
- Area: 8.1 acres (3.3 ha)
- Built: 1859
- Architectural style: Federal; Greek Revival
- NRHP reference No.: 87000731
- Added to NRHP: May 14, 1987

The Killgore House, also known as the Rocky Springs Plantation, is a historic Federal Greek Revival house in Lisbon, Louisiana. It was built in 1859 by Charles A. Killgore.

== Background ==
The property was sold to Charles A. Kilgore of Georgia in 1853 when he moved to Louisiana and built the house. The house became listed on the National Register of Historic Places as of May 14, 1987, due to its old age, large size, and elaborate interior woodworking.
