= Rodessa, Louisiana =

- Village
- Village of Rodessa
- Location of Rodessa in Caddo Parish, Louisiana.

- Location of Louisiana in the United States
- Coordinates: 32°58′26″N 94°00′04″W
- Country: United States
- State: Louisiana
- Parish: Caddo

Area
  - Total: 1.20 sq mi (3.12 km^{2})
  - Land: 1.20 sq mi (3.12 km^{2})
  - Water: 0 sq mi (0.00 km^{2})
- Elevation: 226 ft (69 m)

Population (2020)
  - Total: 192
  - Rank: CD: 8th
  - Density: 159.5/sq mi (61.57/km^{2})
- Time zone: UTC-6 (CST)
  - Summer (DST): UTC-5 (CDT)
- Area code: 318
- FIPS code: 22-65710
- GNIS feature ID: 2407538

Rodessa is a village in Caddo Parish, Louisiana, United States. As of the 2020 census, Rodessa had a population of 192. It is part of the Shreveport–Bossier City Metropolitan Statistical Area.

== History ==
Very little is known on the early days of the settlement as it is believed that Rodessa began as a trading post in the mid-1800s. Locals state that the town was originally named Frog Level as during a town meeting frogs were loudly croaking in a nearby pond. A post office was constructed in 1879, however it may have been in place earlier. By 1898 the Kansas City Southern Railway was built through the area which spurred an increase in population. Rodessa was incorporated as a village in the same year.

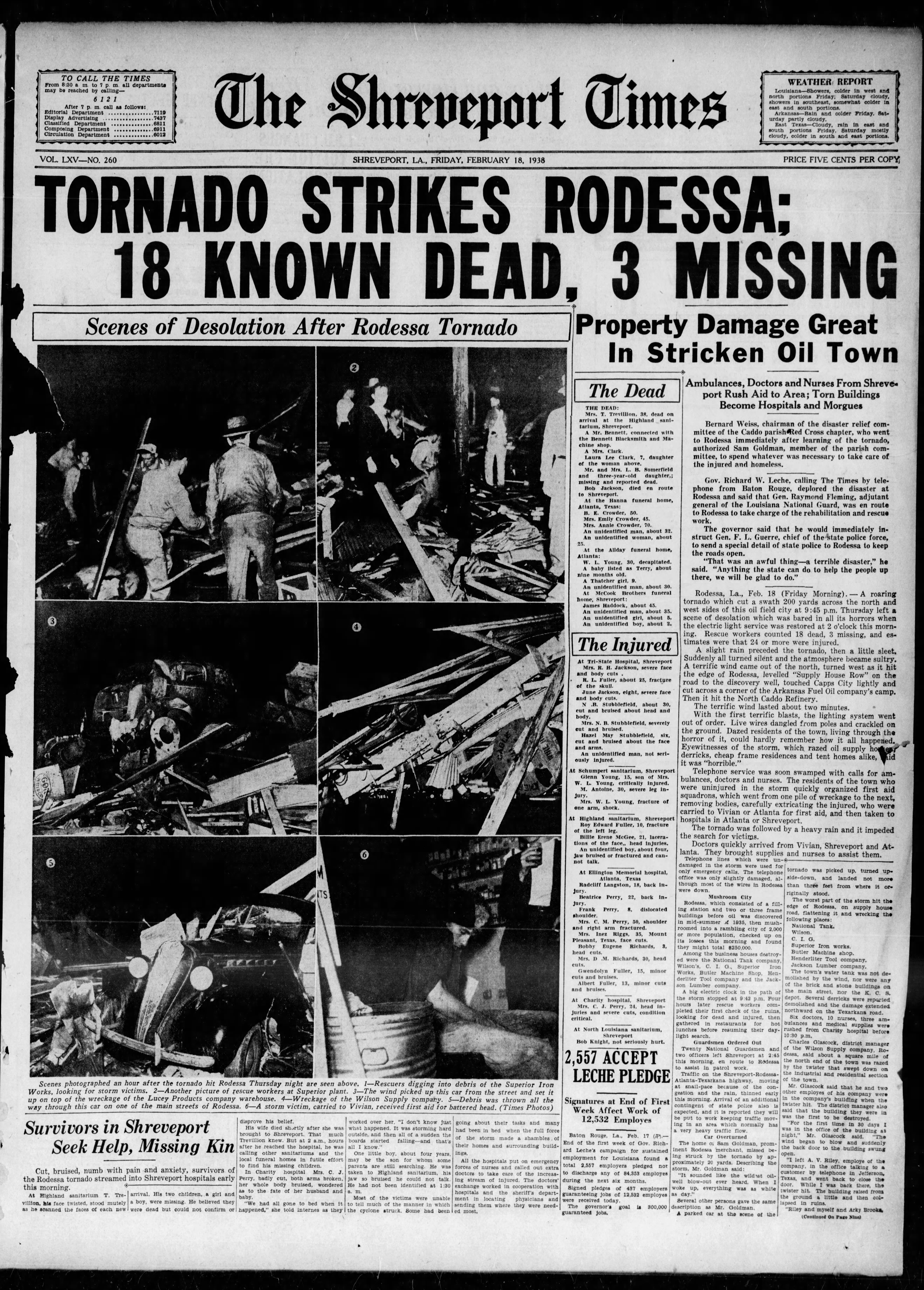
Front page of the Shreveport Times following the tornado.

In the modern era, Rodessa is locally known for its inspiration for the name of the Rodessa Oilfield. The 2,779 acre field stretches from western Louisiana into Cass County and Marion County, Texas. Despite the field being discovered in and named after a village in Louisiana, the majority of the drilling takes place in Texas. Drilling began in 1936 and has continued into the modern day. By 1947 the original oil drill was removed in Rodessa and now a miniature oilfield marker stands as a monument by the modern post office and the abandoned Rodessa Oilfield Museum.

In February, 1938 northwestern Louisiana faced a F4 tornado that destroyed a large portion of Rodessa and left 21 people dead and many more injured.

In the early hours of November 1, 2023 the Caddo Parish Sheriff’s Office responded to a call that 10 train cars owned by Canadian Pacific Kansas City had derailed just north of the village. No deaths or injuries were reported and the only outcome was the temporary closure of LA-1 between United Gas Company Road 3 and Rodessa-State Line Road.

== Geography ==
Rodessa is located in northwestern Caddo Parish and it is the incorporated place in Louisiana closest to the state's northwest corner. Louisiana Highway 1 passes through the village, leading south 7 miles (11 km) to Vivian and northwest 15 miles (24 km) to Atlanta, Texas (as Texas State Highway 77).

According to the United States Census Bureau, Rodessa has a total area of 1.2 square miles (3.2 km^{2}), all land.

== Demographics ==
Historical population
| Census | Pop. | Note | %± |
|---|---|---|---|
| 1970 | 273 | | — |
| 1980 | 337 | | 23.4% |
| 1990 | 294 | | −12.8% |
| 2000 | 307 | | 4.4% |
| 2010 | 270 | | −12.1% |
| 2020 | 192 | | −28.9% |
| 2025 (est.) | 182 | ▼ | −5.2% |
U.S. Decennial Census

As of the census of 2000, there were 307 people, 119 households, and 81 families residing in the village. The population density was 367.7 inhabitants per square mile (142.0/km^{2}). There were 131 housing units at an average density of 156.9 per square mile (60.6/km^{2}). The racial makeup of the village was 70.36% White, 27.69% African American, 1.63% Native American, and 0.33% from two or more races. Hispanic or Latino of any race were 0.33% of the population.

There were 119 households, out of which 36.1% had children under the age of 18 living with them, 48.7% were married couples living together, 14.3% had a female householder with no husband present, and 31.9% were non-families. 28.6% of all households were made up of individuals, and 17.6% had someone living alone who was 65 years of age or older. The average household size was 2.58 and the average family size was 3.17.

In the village, the population was spread out, with 31.6% under the age of 18, 8.5% from 18 to 24, 28.7% from 25 to 44, 17.9% from 45 to 64, and 13.4% who were 65 years of age or older. The median age was 31 years. For every 100 females, there were 108.8 males. For every 100 females age 18 and over, there were 100.0 males.

The median income for a household in the village was $21,750, and the median income for a family was $28,125. Males had a median income of $31,750 versus $13,977 for females. The per capita income for the village was $10,693. About 22.0% of families and 24.6% of the population were below the poverty line, including 34.8% of those under the age of eighteen and 11.6% of those 65 or over.

== Education ==
It is in the Caddo Parish School District.

== Notable person ==
- Dan Flores (1948― ), historian of the American West
