= Diamond, Georgia =

Unincorporated community in Georgia, U.S.

Coordinates: 34°40′27″N 84°16′34″W

Diamond is an unincorporated community in Gilmer County, in the U.S. state of Georgia.

== History ==
A post office called Diamond was established in 1879, and remained in operation until 1953. The community took its name from the nearby Diamond company mines.
