= Orrin Todd House =

Historic house in Connecticut, United States

- U.S. National Register of Historic Places
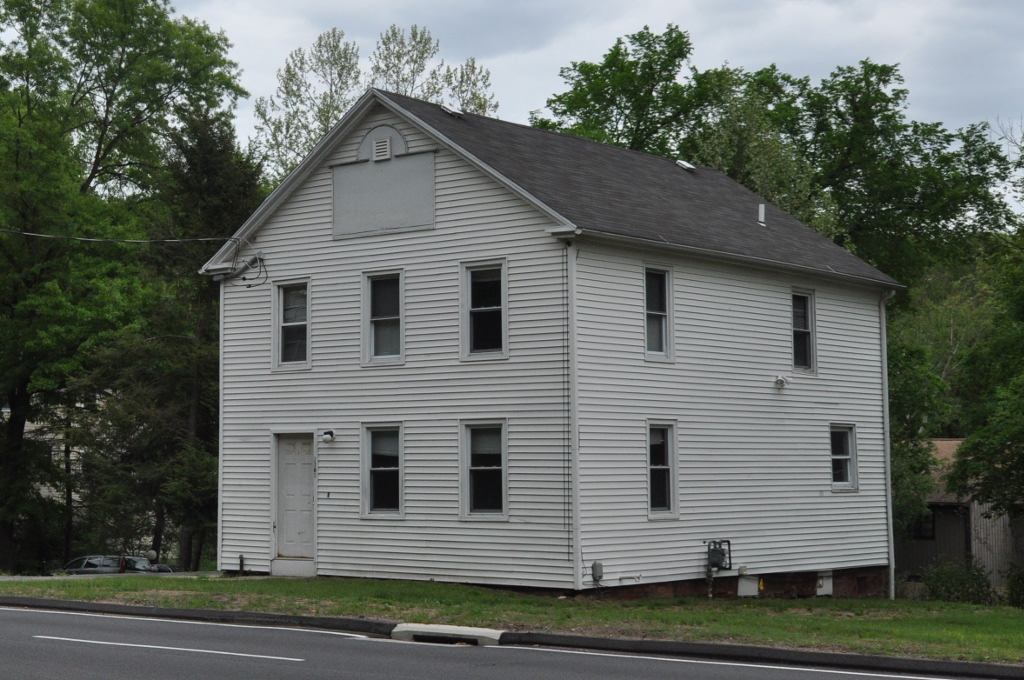

- Location within Connecticut Location within the United States
- Location: 3369 Whitney Avenue, Hamden, Connecticut
- Coordinates: 41°25′02″N 72°54′11″W
- Area: less than one acre
- Built: 1800
- Built by: Todd, Orrin
- Architectural style: Vernacular Federal
- NRHP reference No.: 91001845
- Added to NRHP: December 26, 1991

The Orrin Todd House is a historic house at 3369 Whitney Avenue in Hamden, Connecticut. Built about 1800, it is one of the best surviving examples of Federal period architecture in the town. It was listed on the National Register of Historic Places in 1991. It is presently owned by Quinnipiac University, and was rescued from demolition in 2017.

== Description and history ==
The Orrin Todd House stands in Hamden's northern Mount Carmel area, on the east side of Whitney Avenue (Connecticut Route 10) roughly midway between Sherman Avenue and Mount Carmel Avenue. It is a 2 1/2-story wood-frame structure, covered with gabled roof oriented with the gable toward the street. It is set on a brick foundation which is exposed at the rear of the sloping lot. The main facade is three bays wide, with the main entrance in the left-most bay. The other bays have simply framed sash windows. There is a small Palladian window in the gable, which is presently covered over. The entrance once had a more elaborate surround, which has also either been covered over or removed. The interior retains many original period finishes, including plaster walls and a finely finished fireplace surround in the main parlor.

The house was built about 1800 by Orrin Todd, likely in collaboration with his father, the local housewright Simeon Todd, and was originally located on the west side of the road, which was opened as the Cheshire Turnpike in 1800. The house was moved across the street when the Farmington Canal was constructed in the 1820s through that property. The present property includes one of two surviving tollhouses built for the turnpike. Later in the 19th century a small general store was operated out of an addition to the rear of the building.

The house was acquired in the 20th century by nearby Quinnipiac University, which used it as student housing. The school sought to demolish the building along with other neighboring 19th-century houses in 2016. After a local outcry, the plans were withdrawn.

== See also ==
- National Register of Historic Places listings in New Haven County, Connecticut
