= Arizona, Louisiana =

Unincorporated community in Louisiana, US

Arizona is an unincorporated community in Claiborne Parish, Louisiana, United States. Arizona is located at 32°47′21″N 92°57′28″W

== History ==
Arizona was founded in the 1860s and was named after the Arizona Territory.

G. L. P. Wren, a member of both houses of the Louisiana State Legislature during the 19th century, taught school in Arizona prior to the American Civil War.

The Arizona Methodist Church building is on the National Register of Historic Places.
