= Wilmer, Louisiana =

Unincorporated community in Louisiana

Wilmer Louisiana
- Unincorporated community
- Location within Louisiana Location within the United States
- Coordinates: 30°48′51″N 90°21′45″W
- Country: United States
- State: Louisiana
- Parish: Tangipahoa
- Elevation: 65 ft (20 m)
- Time zone: UTC-6 (Central (CST))
  - Summer (DST): UTC-5 (CDT)
- Postal code: 70444
- Area code: 985
- GNIS feature ID: 556445
- FIPS code: 22-82145

Wilmer is an unincorporated hamlet in the rural north of Tangipahoa Parish, Louisiana, United States. Wilmer is centered on the intersection of LA 10 and LA 1061.

The 1908 Dixie tornados killed four of the settlement's residents.
