= Dr. John W. Todd House =

- U.S. National Register of Historic Places
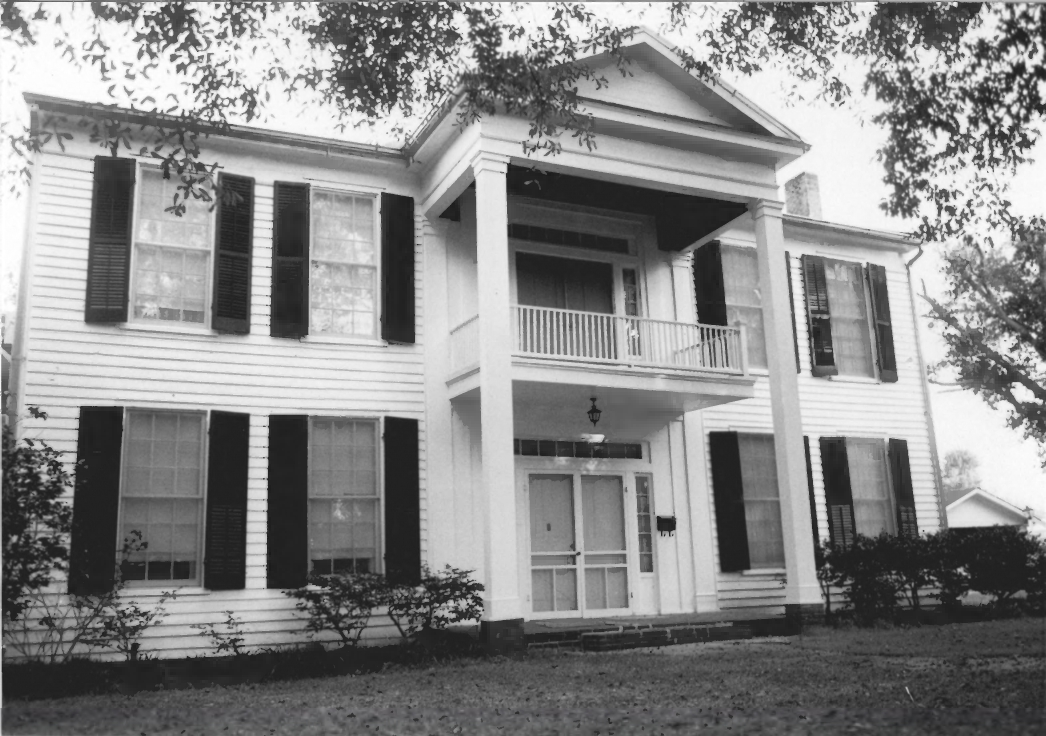

- Location within Louisiana
- Location: 306 Pine St., Homer, Louisiana
- Coordinates: 32°47′24″N 93°02′49″W
- Area: 2 acres (0.81 ha)
- Built: 1867
- Architectural style: Greek Revival
- NRHP reference No.: 86003683
- Added to NRHP: January 22, 1987

The Killgore House, also known as the Rocky Springs Plantation, is a historic Federal Greek Revival house in Lisbon, Louisiana. It was built in 1859 by Charles A. Killgore.

== Background ==
The property was sold to Charles A. Kilgore of Georgia in 1853 when he moved to Louisiana and built the house. The house was placed on the National Register of Historic Places on May 14, 1987, thanks to its old age, large size, and extensive interior woodworking.
