= Center Point, Louisiana =

- Census-designated place
- Location within the state of Louisiana
- Coordinates: 31°14′53″N 92°12′32″W
- Country: United States
- State: Louisiana
- Parishes: Avoyelles

Area
  - Total: 4.73 sq mi (12.25 km^{2})
  - Land: 4.73 sq mi (12.25 km^{2})
  - Water: 0 sq mi (0.00 km^{2})
- Elevation: 72 ft (22 m)

Population (2020)
  - Total: 520
  - Density: 109.9/sq mi (42.45/km^{2})
- Time zone: UTC-6 (Central (CST))
  - Summer (DST): UTC-5 (CST)
- ZIP code: 71323
- FIPS code: 22-13855
- GNIS feature ID: 2586673
- Website: 2586673

Center Point is an unincorporated community and census-designated place in Avoyelles Parish, Louisiana, United States. As of the 2020 census, Center Point had a population of 520.

Center Point is located along Louisiana Highway 107, 13 miles (21 km) northwest of Marksville, the parish seat, and 16 miles (26 km) east of Alexandria.

== Demographics ==
Historical population
Census	Pop.	Note	%±
2010	492		—
2020	520		5.7%
U.S. Decennial Census

Center Point was first listed as a census designated place in the 2010 U.S. census.
