= Ruby, Louisiana =

- Unincorporated community
- Location within Louisiana Location within the United States
- Coordinates: 31°11′22″N 92°14′55″W
- Country: United States
- State: Louisiana
- Parish: Rapides
- Elevation: 98 ft (30 m)
- Time zone: UTC-6 (Central (CST))
  - Summer (DST): UTC-5 (CDT)
- ZIP code: 71365
- Area code: 318
- GNIS feature ID: 538760

Ruby is an unincorporated community in Rapides Parish, Louisiana, United States. It is a populated place located within the Parish Governing Authority District C. The community is located on Louisiana Highway 454, 14.3 miles (23.0 km) southeast of Alexandria. Ruby had a post office from April 18, 1900, until October 8, 2011; it still has its own ZIP code, 71365. The elevation of Ruby is 98 feet. Rapides Parish is in the Central Time Zone (UTC -6 hours).
