= Lamourie Lock =

- U.S. National Register of Historic Places
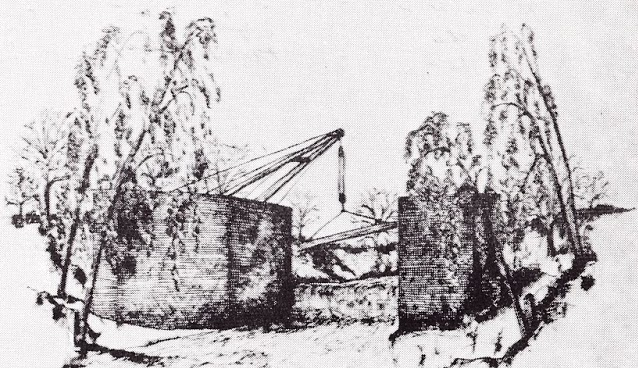

- Location within Louisiana Location within the United States
- Nearest city: Lecompte, Louisiana
- Coordinates: 31°7′46″N 92°24′24″W
- Area: less than 1 acre (0.40 ha)
- NRHP reference No.: 94001218
- Added to NRHP: 14 October 1994

Lamourie Lock is located near Lecompte, Louisiana. It functioned as a control lock rather than a traditional navigational lock, keeping water from flowing from Bayou Boeuf to Bayou Lamourie, maintaining the water level in the prior. It was added to the National Register of Historic Places on October 14, 1994.

== See also ==
- Historic preservation
- National Register of Historic Places listings in Rapides Parish, Louisiana
