= Lisbon, Louisiana =

- Village
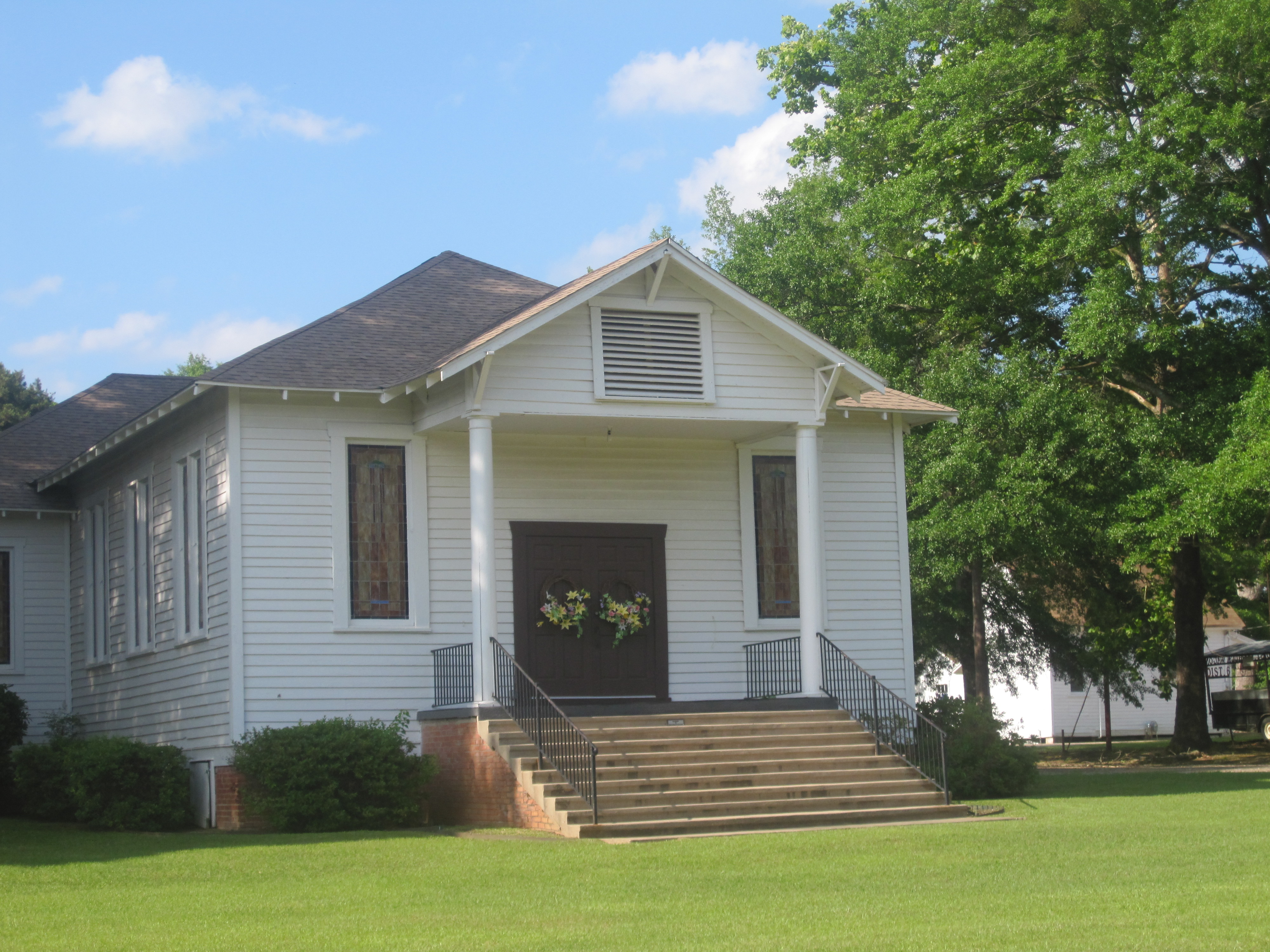
- Lisbon United Methodist Church

- Location of Lisbon in Claiborne Parish, Louisiana.

- Location of Louisiana in the United States
- Coordinates: 32°47′48″N 92°53′12″W
- Country: United States
- State: Louisiana
- Parish: Claiborne

Area
  - Total: 13.12 sq mi (33.99 km^{2})
  - Land: 13.12 sq mi (33.99 km^{2})
  - Water: 0 sq mi (0.00 km^{2})
- Elevation: 305 ft (93 m)

Population (2020)
  - Total: 173
  - Density: 13.2/sq mi (5.09/km^{2})
- Time zone: UTC-6 (CST)
  - Summer (DST): UTC-5 (CDT)
- Area code: 318
- FIPS code: 22-44235
- GNIS feature ID: 2407491

Lisbon is a village in Claiborne Parish, Louisiana, United States. As of the 2020 census, Lisbon had a population of 173. Lisbon is located east of the parish seat of Homer.

Lisbon should not be confused with the village of Lisbon in Calcasieu Parish, Louisiana, which later evolved first into Bagdad and later into the city of Westlake.

== Geography ==
According to the United States Census Bureau, the village has a total area of 13.1 square miles (34 km^{2}), all land.

== Demographics ==
Historical population
Census	Pop.	Note	%±
1960	229		—
1970	151		−34.1%
1980	138		−8.6%
1990	160		15.9%
2000	162		1.3%
2010	185		14.2%
2020	173		−6.5%
2025 (est.)	158	▼	−8.7%
U.S. Decennial Census

As of the census of 2000, there were 162 people, 69 households, and 48 families residing in the village. The population density was 12.3 inhabitants per square mile (4.8/km^{2}). There were 87 housing units at an average density of 6.6 per square mile (2.6/km^{2}). The racial makeup of the village was 65.43% White, 32.72% African American, 0.62% Pacific Islander, and 1.23% from two or more races.

There were 69 households, out of which 24.6% had children under the age of 18 living with them, 55.1% were married couples living together, 11.6% had a female householder with no husband present, and 30.4% were non-families. 26.1% of all households were made up of individuals, and 14.5% had someone living alone who was 65 years of age or older. The average household size was 2.35 and the average family size was 2.79.

In the village, the population was spread out, with 22.2% under the age of 18, 6.2% from 18 to 24, 24.1% from 25 to 44, 34.0% from 45 to 64, and 13.6% who were 65 years of age or older. The median age was 44 years. For every 100 females, there were 105.1 males. For every 100 females age 18 and over, there were 106.6 males.

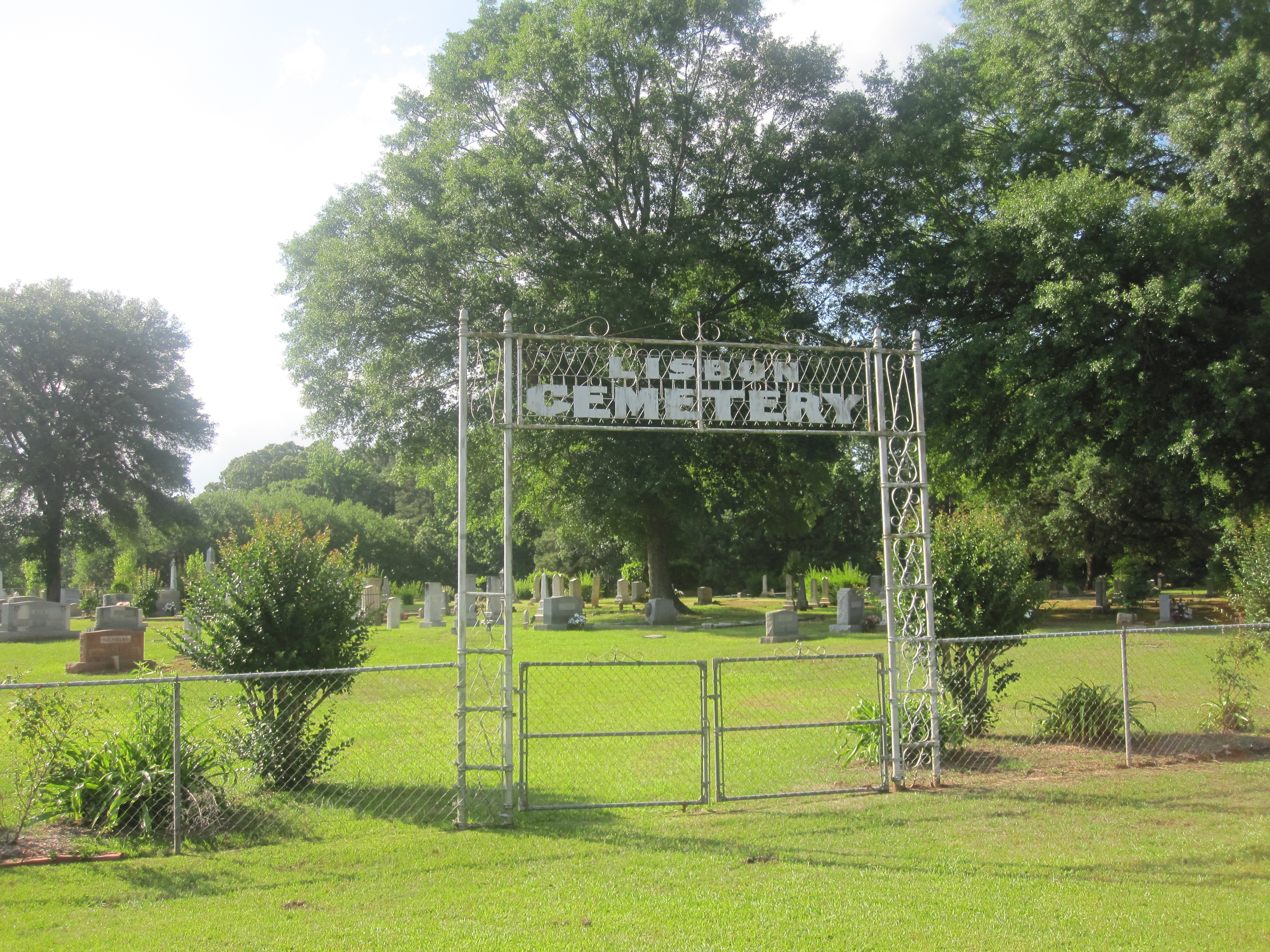
Lisbon Cemetery

The median income for a household in the village was $41,667, and the median income for a family was $50,417. Males had a median income of $36,250 versus $19,375 for females. The per capita income for the village was $18,943. About 3.6% of families and 6.0% of the population were below the poverty line, including 6.3% of those under the age of eighteen and 9.1% of those 65 or over.

== Education ==
Claiborne Parish School Board is the school district for all of the parish.

== Notable people ==
- Willie Davis, professional football player
- Edith Killgore Kirkpatrick, musician and music educator
- Rebel Oakes, professional baseball player
