= Roy Moore (disambiguation) =

Roy Moore is an American judge and politician.

Roy Moore may also refer to:

- Roy Moore (English footballer) (1923–1991), English former professional footballer
- Roy Moore (Australian footballer) (1914–1973), player of Australian football from the 1930s and 1940s
- Roy Moore (baseball) (1898–1951), 1920s Major League Baseball pitcher
- Roy Moore (cyclist) (1932–1996), Australian Olympic cyclist
- Roy Moore (rugby league) (1928–2022), New Zealand rugby league player
- Roy D. Moore (1921–2014), American college football head coach
- Roy E. Moore, gymnast known as the "father of American gymnastics"
- Roy K. Moore (1914–2008), chief FBI investigator in the murders of Chaney, Goodman, and Schwerner
- Roy Moore (wrestler), wrestling and judo coach
- Roy H. Moore Jr., his son, wrestling coach
- A. Roy Moore, screenwriter of Black Christmas

== See also ==
- Danny Roy Moore (1925–c. 2020), Louisiana state senator
- Ray Moore (disambiguation)
