= Homer Historic District =

Homer Historic District may refer to:

in the United States (by state)

- Homer Historic District (Homer, Georgia), listed on the NRHP in Banks County, Georgia
- Homer Historic District (Homer, Louisiana), listed on the NRHP in Claiborne Parish, Louisiana
- Homer Village Historic District, Homer, Michigan, listed on the NRHP in Calhoun County, Michigan
- Old Homer Village Historic District, Homer, New York, NRHP-listed, in Cortland County
