= Herbert S. Ford Memorial Museum =

- Hotel Claiborne
- U.S. Historic district – Contributing property
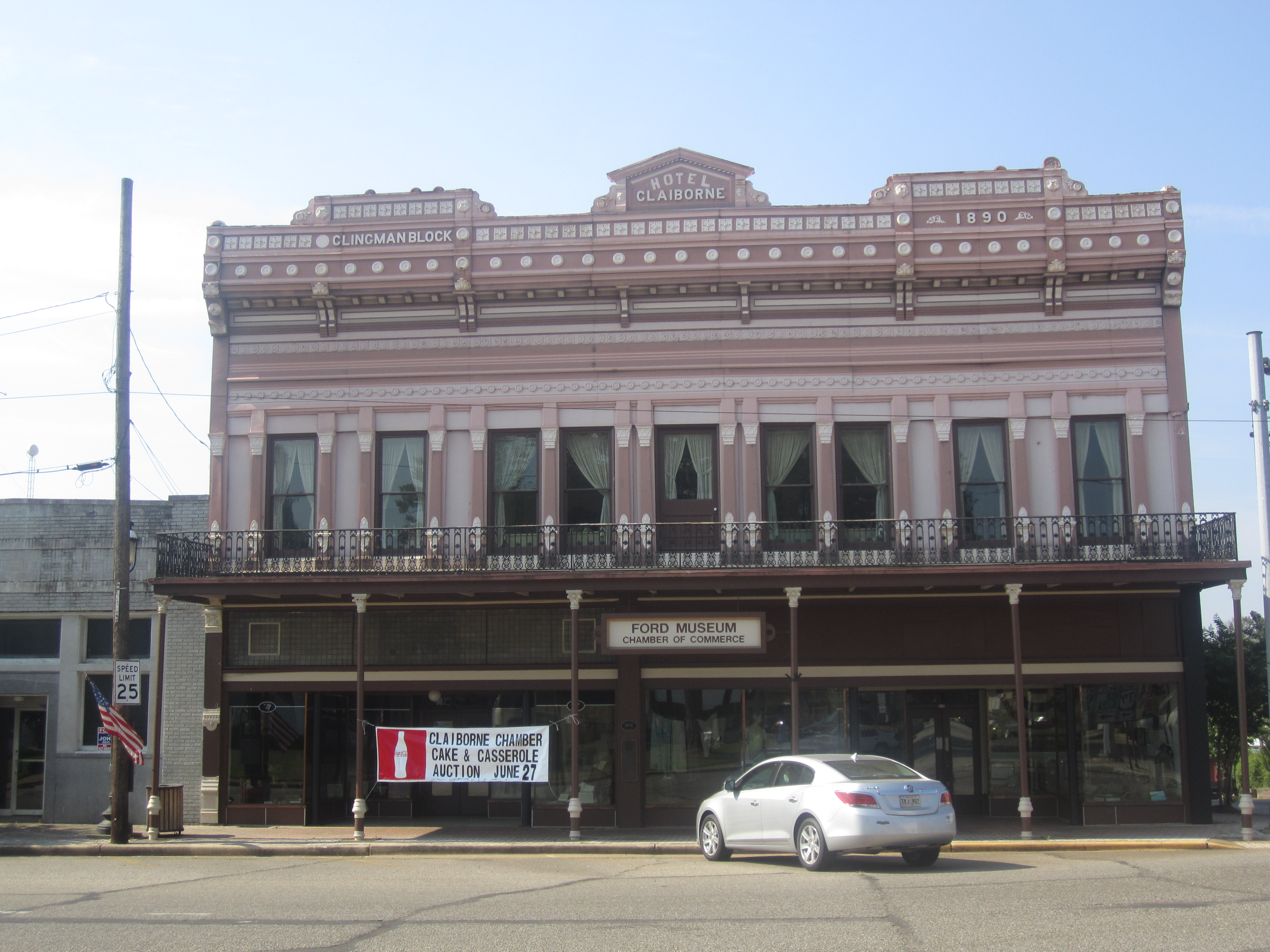
- The museum from town square in 2012

- Location within Louisiana Location within the United States
- Location: 519 South Main Street; Homer, Louisiana 71040
- Coordinates: 32°47′28″N 93°03′19″W
- Built: 1890
- Architectural style: Italianate
- Website: www.hfordmuseum.com
- Part of: Homer Historic District (ID86001994)
- Designated CP: August 28, 1986

The Herbert S. Ford Memorial Museum is a museum of local history and culture housed in the former Claiborne Hotel at 519 South Main Street in Homer in Claiborne Parish in North Louisiana. The Homer Chamber of Commerce is headquartered inside the two-story museum, which is located across the historic town square from the Claiborne Parish Courthouse.

== History of museum ==
Listed as a contributing property of the National Register of Historic Places, the museum has housed the collection of Homer businessman Herbert Ford (1889-1960) since 1982. Prior to that, the collection first started in 1924 had been in a variety of locations. Ford a United States Army infantry captain during World War I. Ford and his wife, the former Ruth Meadows (1895-1996), lost a son at sea during World War II.

== Cotton and petroleum ==
The museum claims to hold the oldest compressed bale of cotton in existence in the United States. This cotton was baled about 1930. A similar bale is displayed at the Louisiana Cotton Museum in Lake Providence in East Carroll Parish in the farm-rich delta section west of the Mississippi River in northeastern Louisiana.

"Black Gold", a replica of an oilfield roughneck, a general laborer who loads and unloads cargo from crane baskets and keeps the drilling equipment clean, is located next to the cotton exhibit. The roughneck was employed in the early 1930s by the Sinclair Oil and Gas Company. A recording explains how a farm family growing primarily cotton and corn faced economic travail in Mississippi but relocated to Claiborne Parish to benefit from opportunities in the oil and natural gas boom. "Oil changed our lives forever. We owe a lot to the men, mud, and mules that made it happen," concludes the recorded message. In 1921, oil was discovered in Homer; another strike followed that same year in Haynesville in northern Claiborne Parish near the Arkansas state line. The boom continued through the 1930s and brought many guests to the Hotel Claiborne, which opened in 1890.

== Military exhibits ==
There is a small exhibit downstairs on the American Civil War with three Confederate flags on the wall. Particularly moving is a letter to a widow whose husband was killed on July 20, 1864, at the Battle of Atlanta in Georgia. Here is an excerpt:

He was shot through the neck cutting the large vein from which he died in a very few moments. ... A Christian heart like yours will turn to the words of the blessed Savior. ... Your husband died a true patriot and a good soldier. And angels have caught up his spirit and carried it to a land of rest where there is no war or troubles to molest.

A section upstairs honors military veterans of the 20th century, with two individuals cited for recognition: (1) Larry Sale, the Claiborne Parish sheriff from 1936 to 1944, was Louisiana's most decorated soldier of World War I. (2) David Wade (1911-1990), a native of the Holly Springs community between Homer and Minden, a lieutenant general in three wars, received more than a dozen medals. Wade served as state corrections officer during the 1960s in the administration of Governor John McKeithen. The Wade Correctional Center, a state prison between Homer and Haynesville, is named in his honor.

== Other exhibits ==
The Ford Museum displays an early ballot box with attached explanation that voters until the 1890s orally stated their political choices at the polling place without the confidentiality of now required secret ballots. There is a framed copy of the 1935 centennial edition of the Shreveport Journal. Thought that defunct newspaper did not exist in 1835, the copy on display, created for 1935, is written with reference to Andrew Jackson serving as U.S. president a century earlier.

Among other artifacts on display is a pirogue or dugout canoe made of cypress logs used by Indians and white pioneers alike prior to the Civil War. There are replicas of irons and ironing boards, a water wheel, a bank, a railroad station, a judge's office, a doctor's office, the canning of foods, a general store with a collection of glass milk bottles, a gun rack, a carriage, a chapel, and even mounted African mammals.

Another exhibit is an early Claiborne Hotel guest room. A log cabin from the George Green homestead east of Haynesville is displayed with a combination bedroom and dining table. There are several 1930s-style radios, including a large Philco cabinet model 37-630, the kind by which some may have listened to President Franklin D. Roosevelt's fireside chats.

There is a model school classroom and information on Claiborne Parish Superintendent Forney C. Haley (1905-1982), whose service extended from 1945 to 1969. He was also a president of the Louisiana Superintendents Association. Haley began his educational career in 1931 in Junction City on the Arkansas border. There is a poster on the African American Reverend Roy Mayfield, who launched the former Homer Norman Institute in 1900. The former St. John School was later the first four-year high school for black pupils in Claiborne Parish.

Almost hidden is a poster on the frontier peace officer Pat Garrett, an Alabama native who was reared on a plantation near Haynesville before he left for Lincoln and Doña Ana counties in southeastern New Mexico. Known to history for having shot to death the bandit Billy the Kid, twenty-seven years later in 1908, Garrett himself fell to an assassin's bullet in Las Cruces, New Mexico.

Clothing designer Geoffrey Beene, a Haynesville native, became in 1963 the first American designer to launch his own company. His designs include the dress that Lynda Bird Johnson wore when in 1967 she wed future U.S. Senator Charles S. Robb of Virginia.

== Old-time virtues ==
The museum stresses old-time virtues. A placard proclaims that "Self-Reliance was the key to survive in frontier times. Many early farmers became respectful blacksmiths and soon built out-of-door forges with removable bellows and worked outside whenever the weather permitted."

A placard at the sewing and quilting exhibit declares that a "Pioneer woman's experience found expression in the folk art of their quilts. Legacy quilts were passed from mother to child as a record of their family lives. The blocks [on the quilts] told of fire and storms, of first loves and weddings, of childbirth and lost homes."

Admission to the Ford Museum is $3 for adults, $1 for children, and $5 maximum for a family. Hours are 9:30 to 12 and 1:30 to 4 p.m. Mondays, Wednesdays, and Fridays, and by appointment.
