= Haynesville, Louisiana =

- Town
- Location of Haynesville in Claiborne Parish, Louisiana.

- Location of Louisiana in the United States
- Coordinates: 32°57′45″N 93°07′48″W
- Country: United States
- State: Louisiana
- Parish: Claiborne
- Founded: 1818

Area
  - Total: 4.84 sq mi (12.53 km^{2})
  - Land: 4.83 sq mi (12.50 km^{2})
  - Water: 0.012 sq mi (0.03 km^{2})
- Elevation: 367 ft (112 m)

Population (2020)
  - Total: 2,039
  - Density: 422.3/sq mi (163.06/km^{2})
- Time zone: UTC−6 (CST)
  - Summer (DST): UTC−5 (CDT)
- ZIP code: 71038
- Area code: 318
- FIPS code: 22-33525
- GNIS feature ID: 2405809
- Website: haynesvillela.org

Haynesville is a town in northern Claiborne Parish, Louisiana, United States, located just south of the Arkansas border. The population was 2,039 in 2020.

Haynesville is known as the "Gateway to North Louisiana" and the "Butterfly Capital of Louisiana". Loice Kendrick-Lacy of Haynesville published Gardening To Attract Butterflies: The Beauty And The Beast (2012). Kendrick-Lacy begins with memories of her childhood, when she was introduced to butterflies by her grandmother.

== History ==
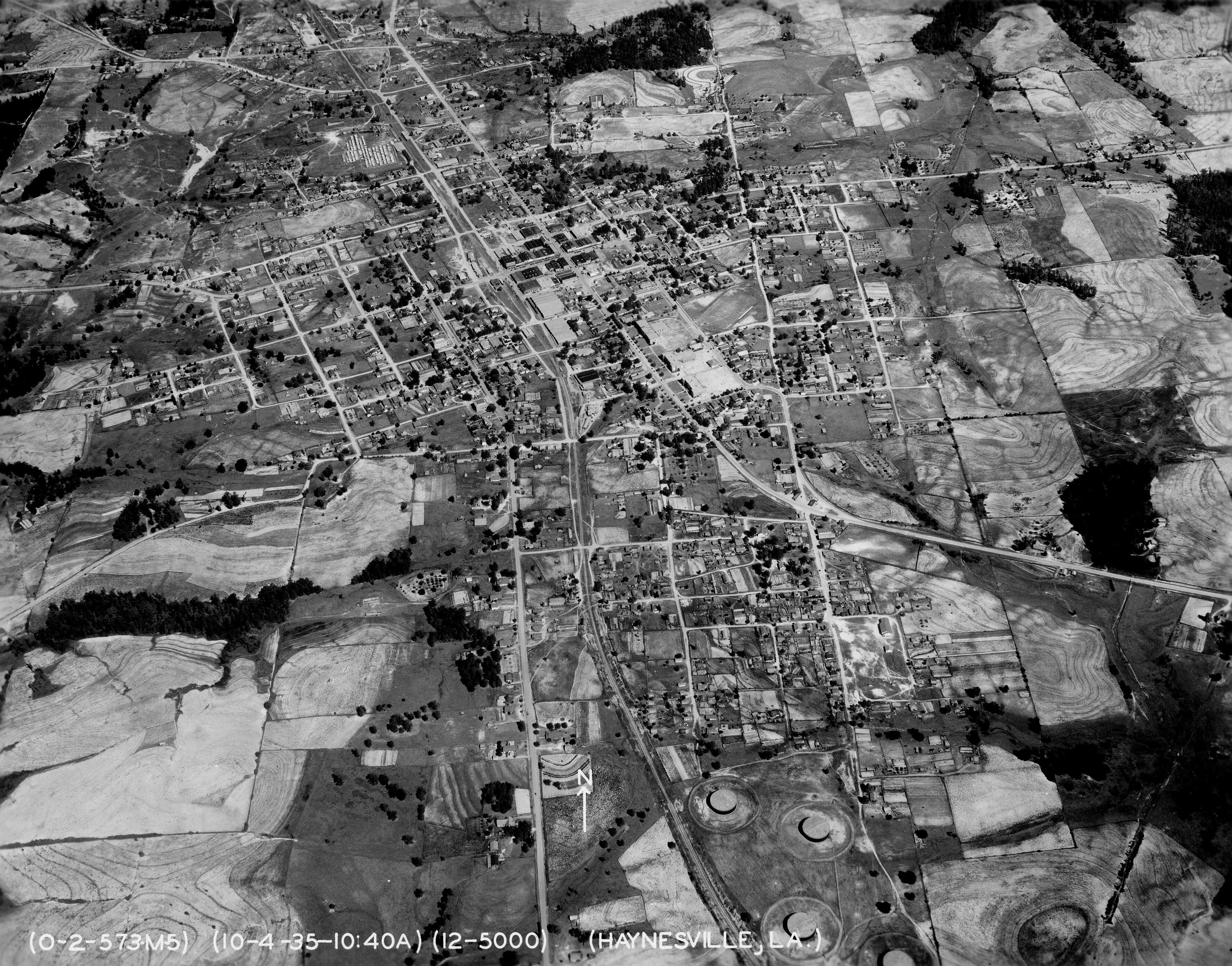
Haynesville in 1935

The town of Haynesville is the namesake of the Haynesville Shale, an upper Jurassic formation that is difficult to define on a technical basis but nevertheless covers a broad region of western Louisiana and east Texas and contains a large natural gas resource. On March 24, 2008, Chesapeake Energy announced a new natural gas discovery in the Haynesville Shale. This announcement began a new chapter in the development of the Hayneville Shale and hastened the activities of several other companies in the play.

The town's churches include Baptist, United Methodist, Presbyterian, Missionary Baptist, Pentecostal, and Church of Christ. This part of the state was settled by Protestants from other parts of the South, more than by ethnic French, Louisiana Creole, Italian and Irish Catholics more typically found in the New Orleans area.

Material on the history of Haynesville can be found at the Herbert S. Ford Memorial Museum located across from the Claiborne Parish Courthouse in Homer.

== Geography ==
According to the United States Census Bureau, the town has a total area of 4.8 square miles (12.5 km^{2}), of which 4.8 square miles (12.5 km^{2}) is land and 0.22% is water.

The most common soil is Eastwood series, which has 3 to 10 inches (76 to 254 mm) of brown very fine sandy loam over 20 inches (510 mm) of red clay. It supports a native forest vegetation of loblolly pine, shortleaf pine, southern red oak, American sweet gum and hickory.

=== Climate ===
The climate in this area is characterized by hot, humid summers and generally mild to cool winters. According to the Köppen Climate Classification system, Haynesville has a humid subtropical climate, abbreviated "Cfa" on climate maps.

== Demographics ==
Historical population
Census	Pop.	Note	%±
1880	123		—
1910	663		—
1920	903		36.2%
1930	2,541		181.4%
1940	2,418		−4.8%
1950	3,040		25.7%
1960	3,031		−0.3%
1970	3,055		0.8%
1980	3,454		13.1%
1990	2,854		−17.4%
2000	2,679		−6.1%
2010	2,327		−13.1%
2020	2,039		−12.4%
2025 (est.)	1,872	▼	−8.2%
U.S. Decennial Census

=== 2020 census ===
As of the 2020 census, Haynesville had a population of 2,039. The median age was 42.5 years. 24.6% of residents were under the age of 18 and 21.5% were 65 years of age or older. For every 100 females, there were 81.1 males, and for every 100 females age 18 and over, there were 76.0 males age 18 and over.

0.0% of residents lived in urban areas, while 100.0% lived in rural areas.

There were 836 households in Haynesville, of which 32.7% had children under the age of 18 living in them. Of all households, 31.6% were married-couple households, 18.9% were households with a male householder and no spouse or partner present, and 43.9% were households with a female householder and no spouse or partner present. About 35.5% of all households were made up of individuals, and 17.0% had someone living alone who was 65 years of age or older.

There were 932 housing units, of which 10.3% were vacant. The homeowner vacancy rate was 2.2% and the rental vacancy rate was 6.4%.

Haynesville racial composition as of 2020
Race	Number	Percentage
White (non-Hispanic)	679	33.3%
Black or African American (non-Hispanic)	1,233	60.47%
Native American	12	0.59%
Asian	2	0.1%
Other/Mixed	77	3.78%
Hispanic or Latino	36	1.77%

== Government and infrastructure ==
The United States Postal Service operates the Haynesville Post Office.

Louisiana Department of Public Safety and Corrections operates the David Wade Correctional Center in an unincorporated section of Claiborne Parish near Haynesville.

== Crime ==
In May 1999, the Haynesville Police Department discovered the skeletal remains of Shannon Capers, a 13-year-old girl who had been missing since March 8, 1997. She was found in the woods behind the Mill Street Apartments on the north side of town. Capers had lived in the apartments. She was known to have been murdered by her boyfriend, a local drug dealer named Maurice Tate.

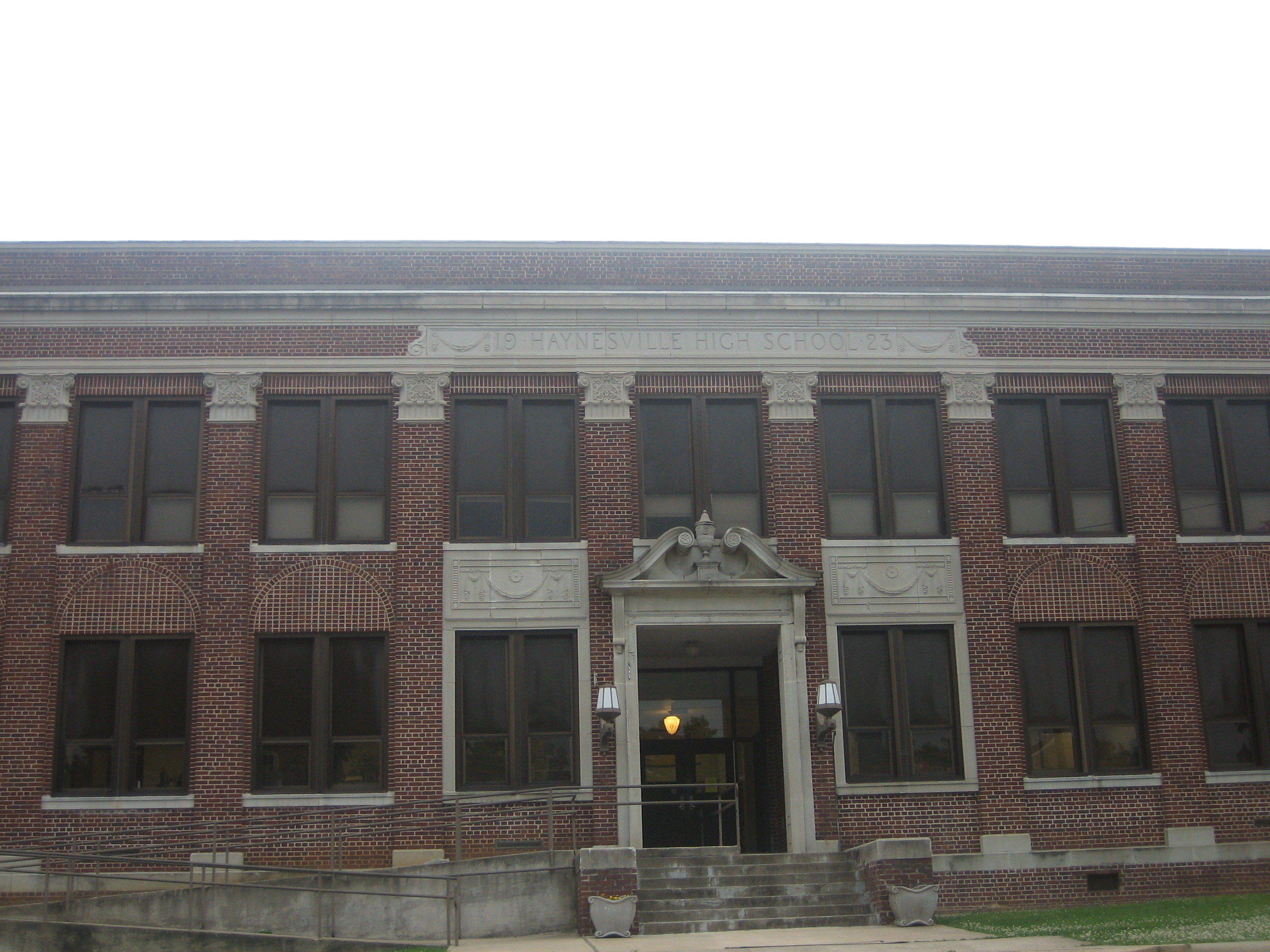
Haynesville Junior-Senior High School

== Education ==
The Claiborne Parish School Board is the local school district for the entire parish. It operates Haynesville Elementary School and Haynesville Junior/Senior High School.

== Notable people ==
- Geoffrey Beene, American fashion designer, born August 30, 1924
- Demetric Evans, NFL football player (San Francisco 49ers)
- Doug Evans, former NFL football player (Green Bay Packers; Super Bowl XXXI champion)
- Frederick Douglass Kirkpatrick, musician and civil rights activist
- John Sidney Garrett, Speaker of the Louisiana House of Representatives (1968–1972)
- Jim Haynes (1933–2021), leading figure in British counter-culture
- George H. Mahon, U.S. Representative from Texas's 19th congressional district from 1935 to 1979.
- Danny Roy Moore (1925–c. 2020), Louisiana state senator from 1964 to 1968
- Bob Odom, former Louisiana commissioner of Agriculture and Forestry
- Larry Sale, sheriff of Claiborne Parish from 1936 to 1944
- A. L. Williams, high school and college football coach; born in Haynesville

== Photo gallery ==
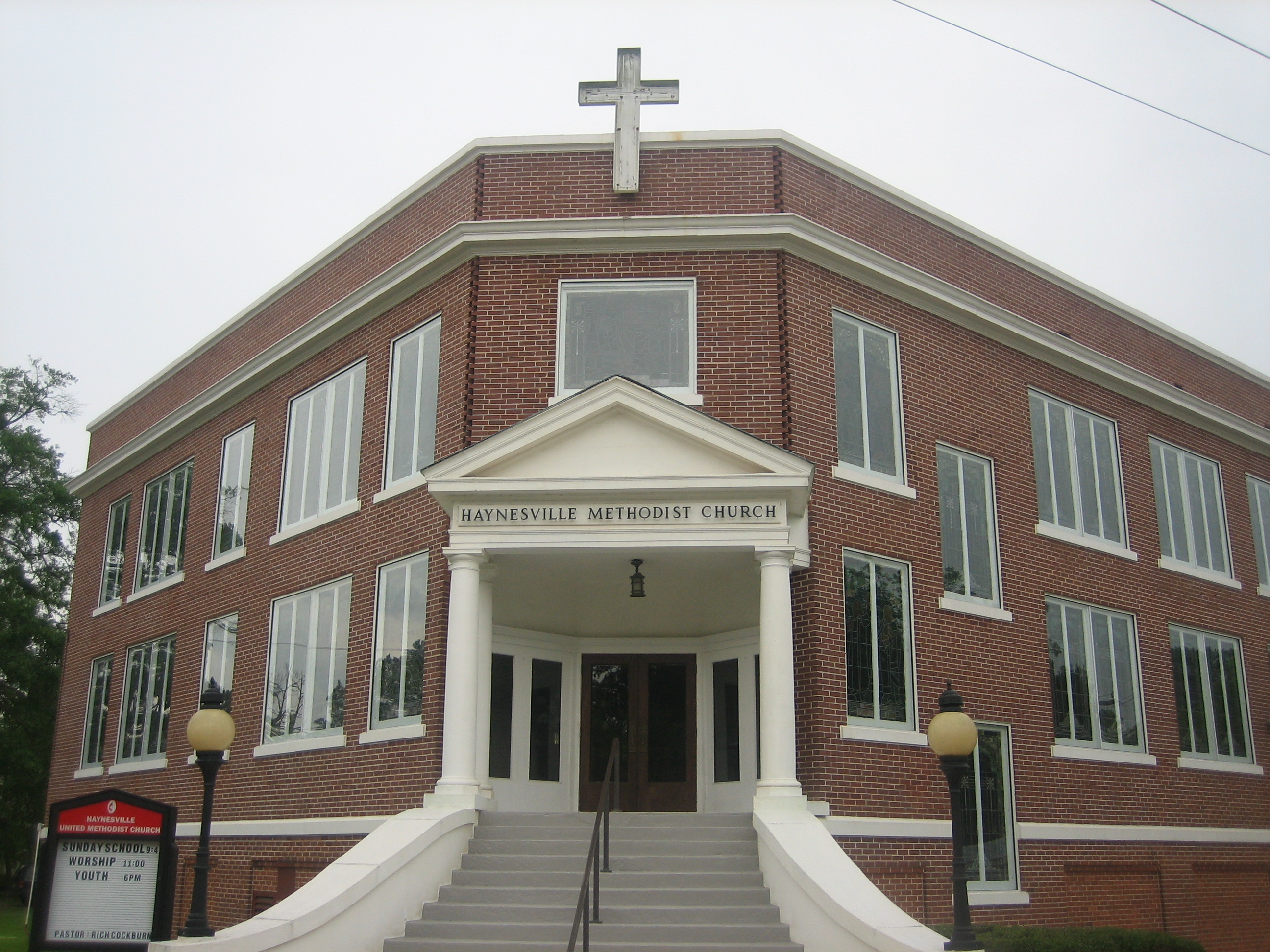
Haynesville United Methodist Church

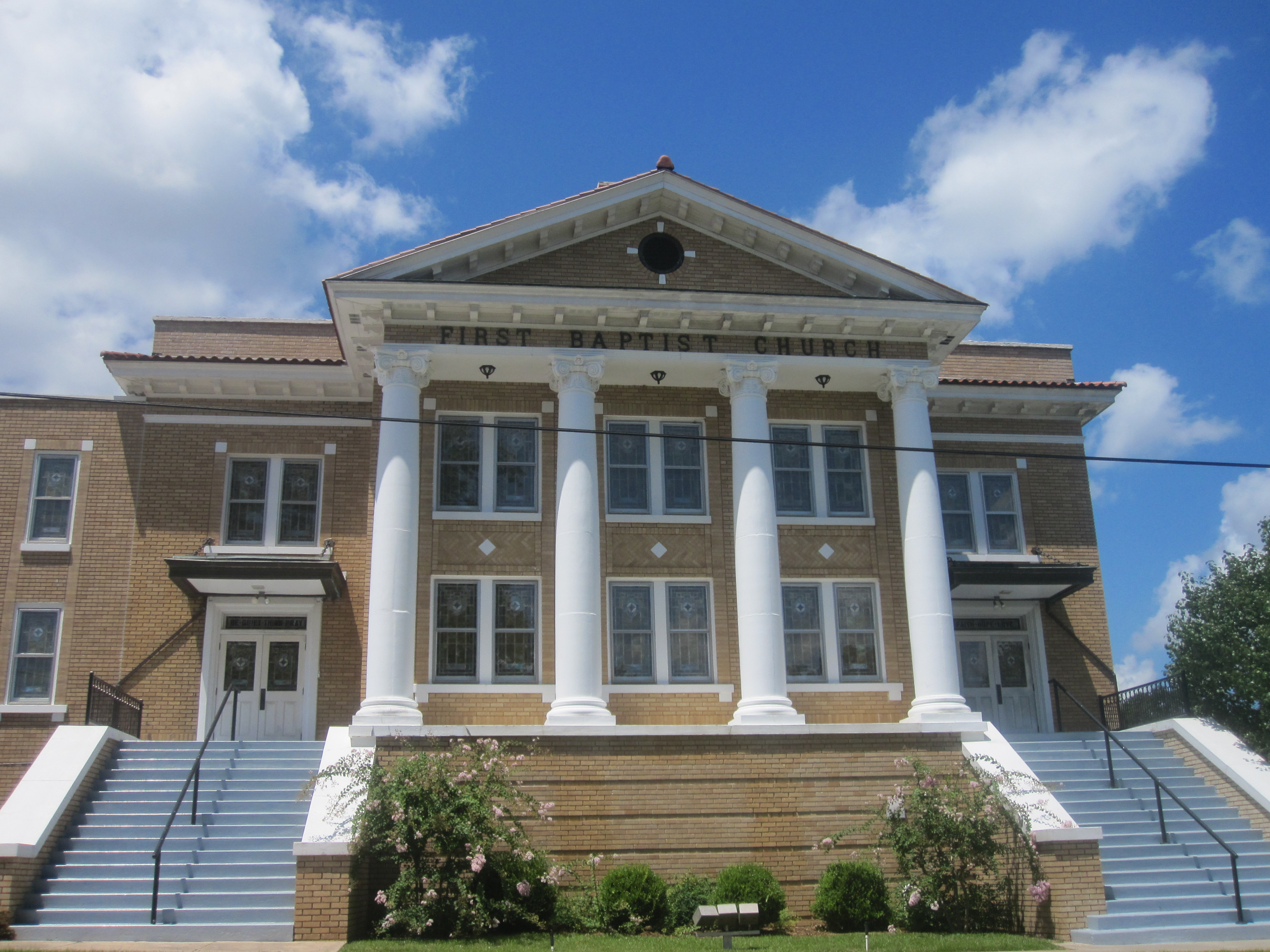
First Baptist Church in downtown Haynesville

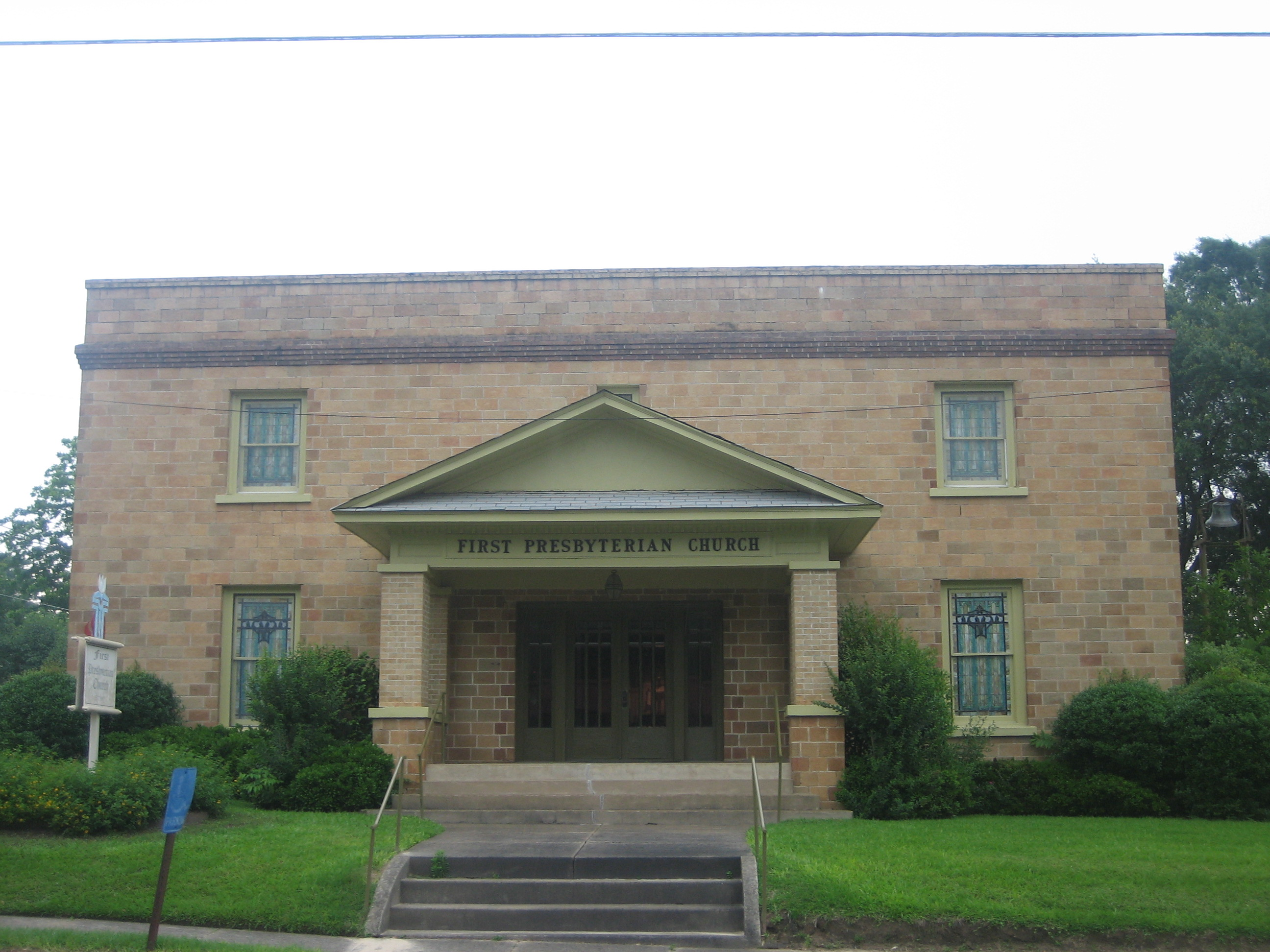
The First Presbyterian Church in Haynesville

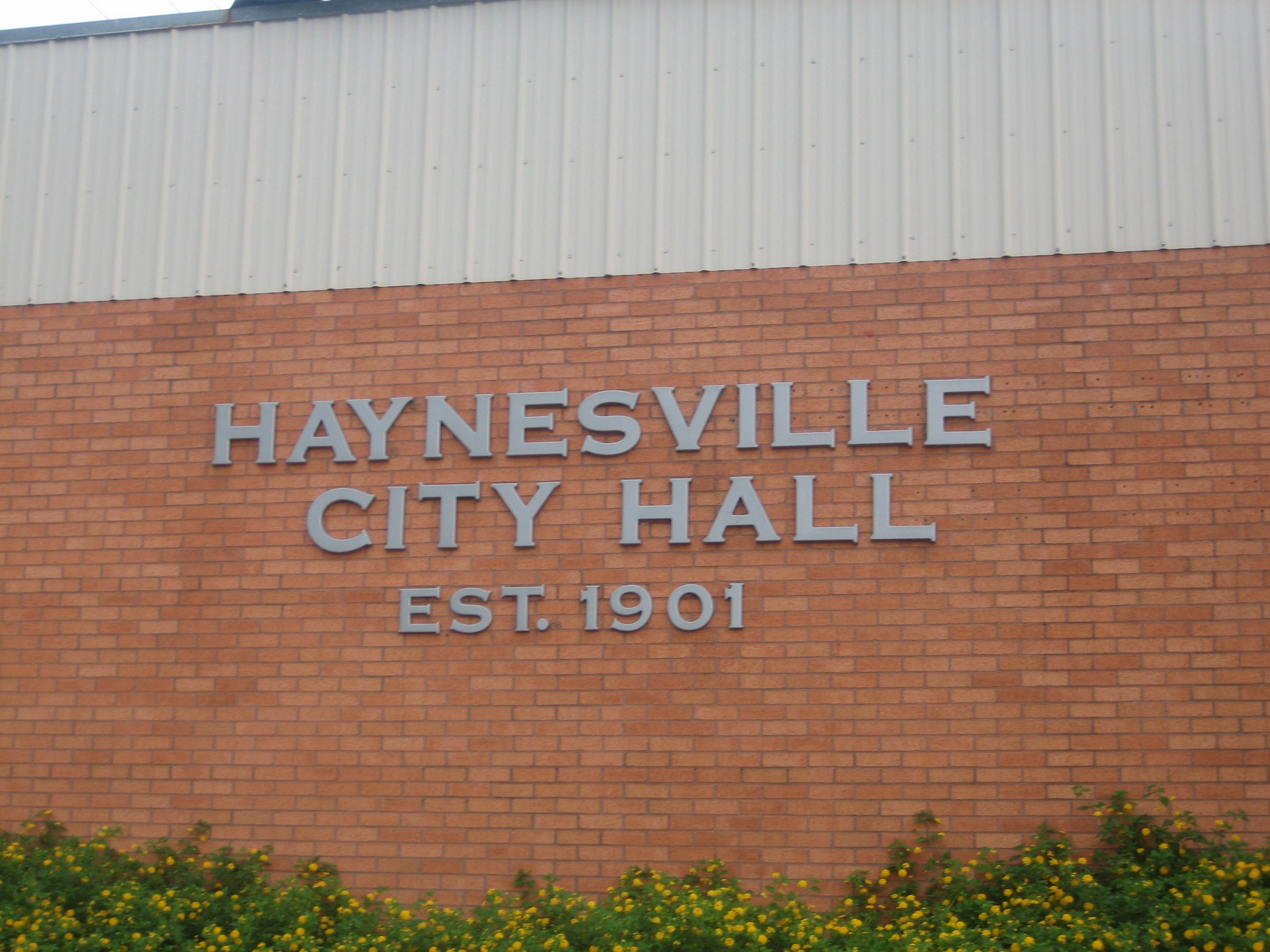
City Hall in Haynesville

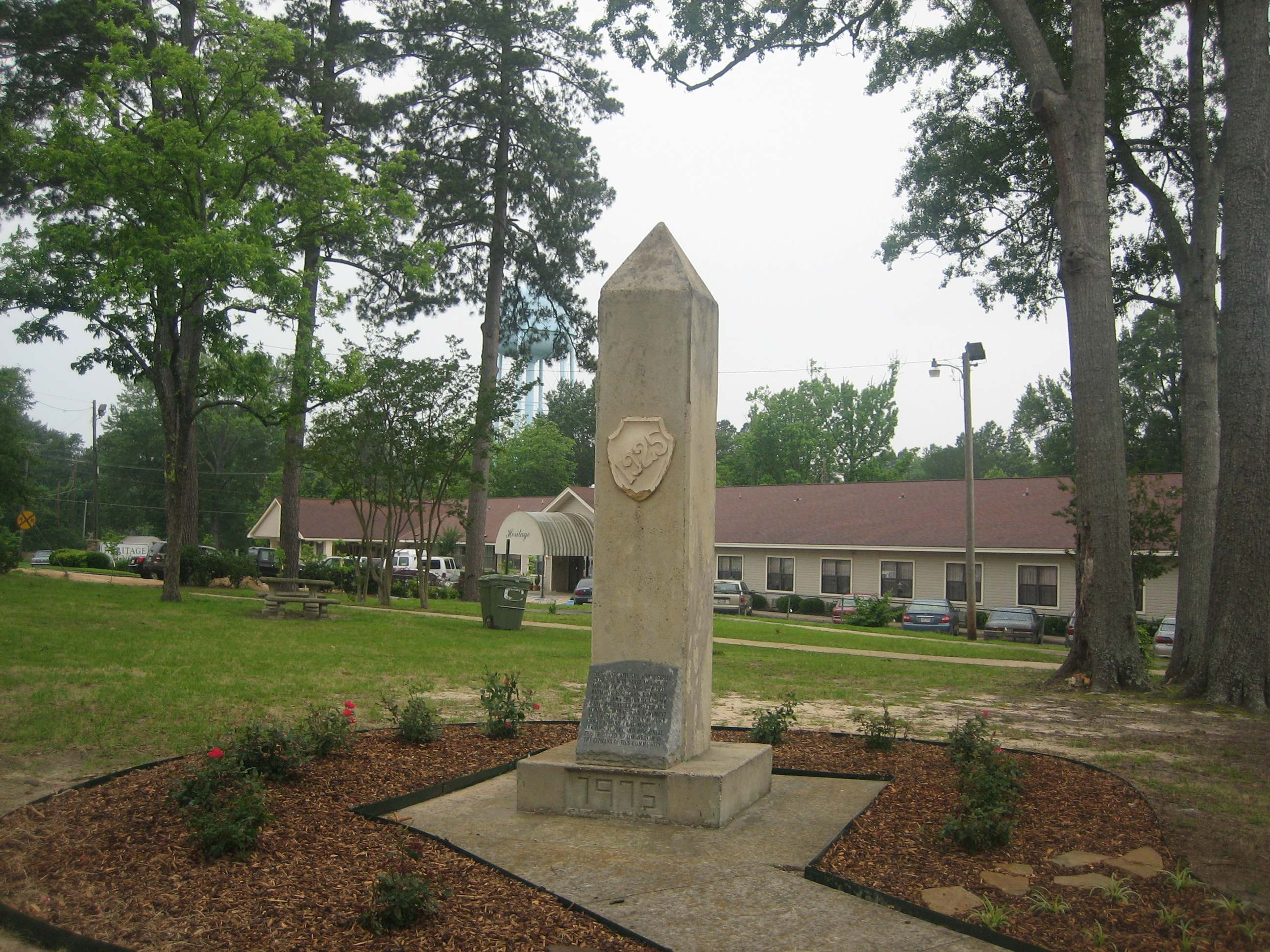
This obelisk erected in 1976 in Bicentennial Park in Haynesville is dedicated to the medical profession.

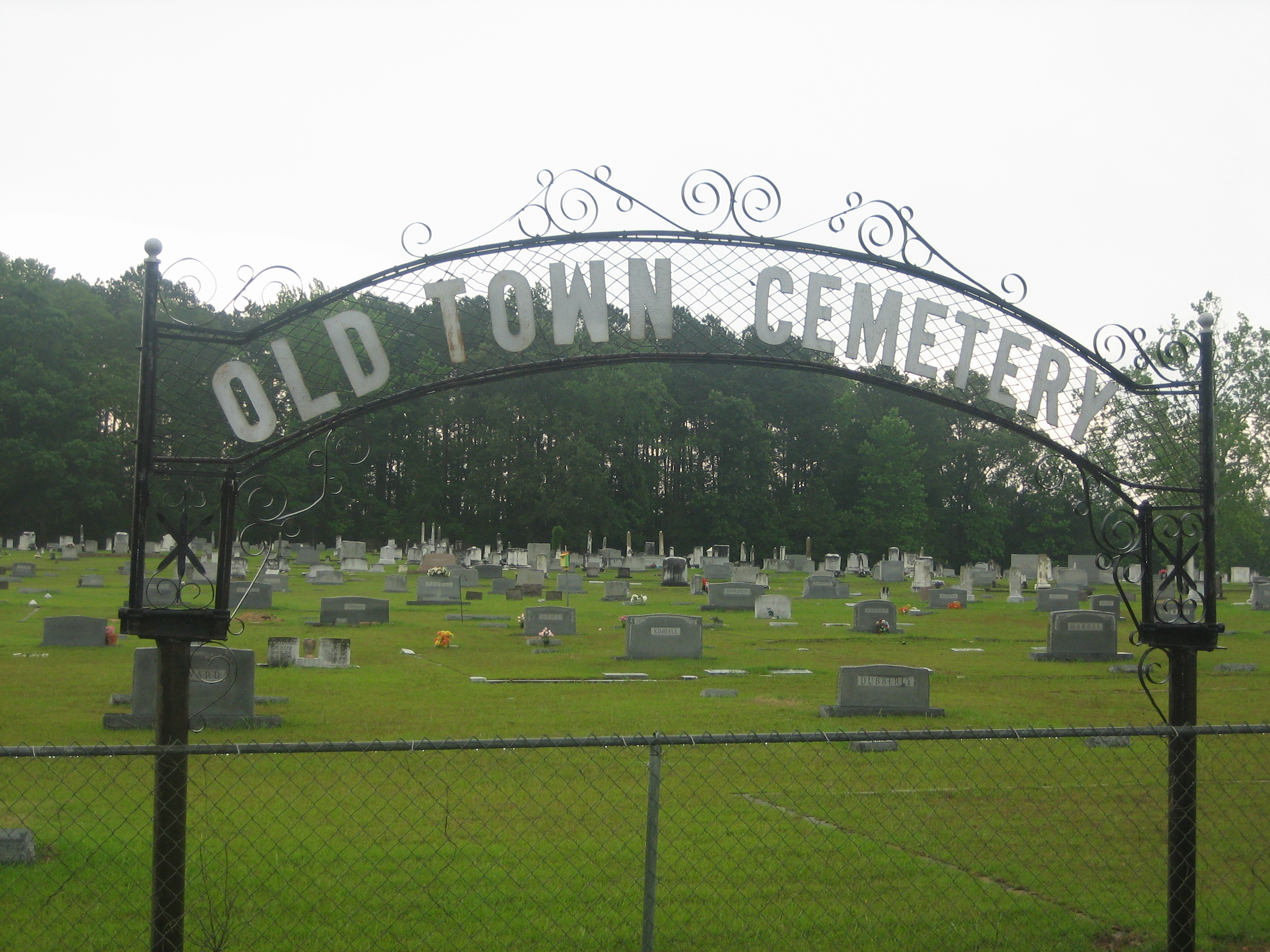
The large Old Town Cemetery in south Haynesville.
