= Homer Village Historic District =

- U.S. National Register of Historic Places
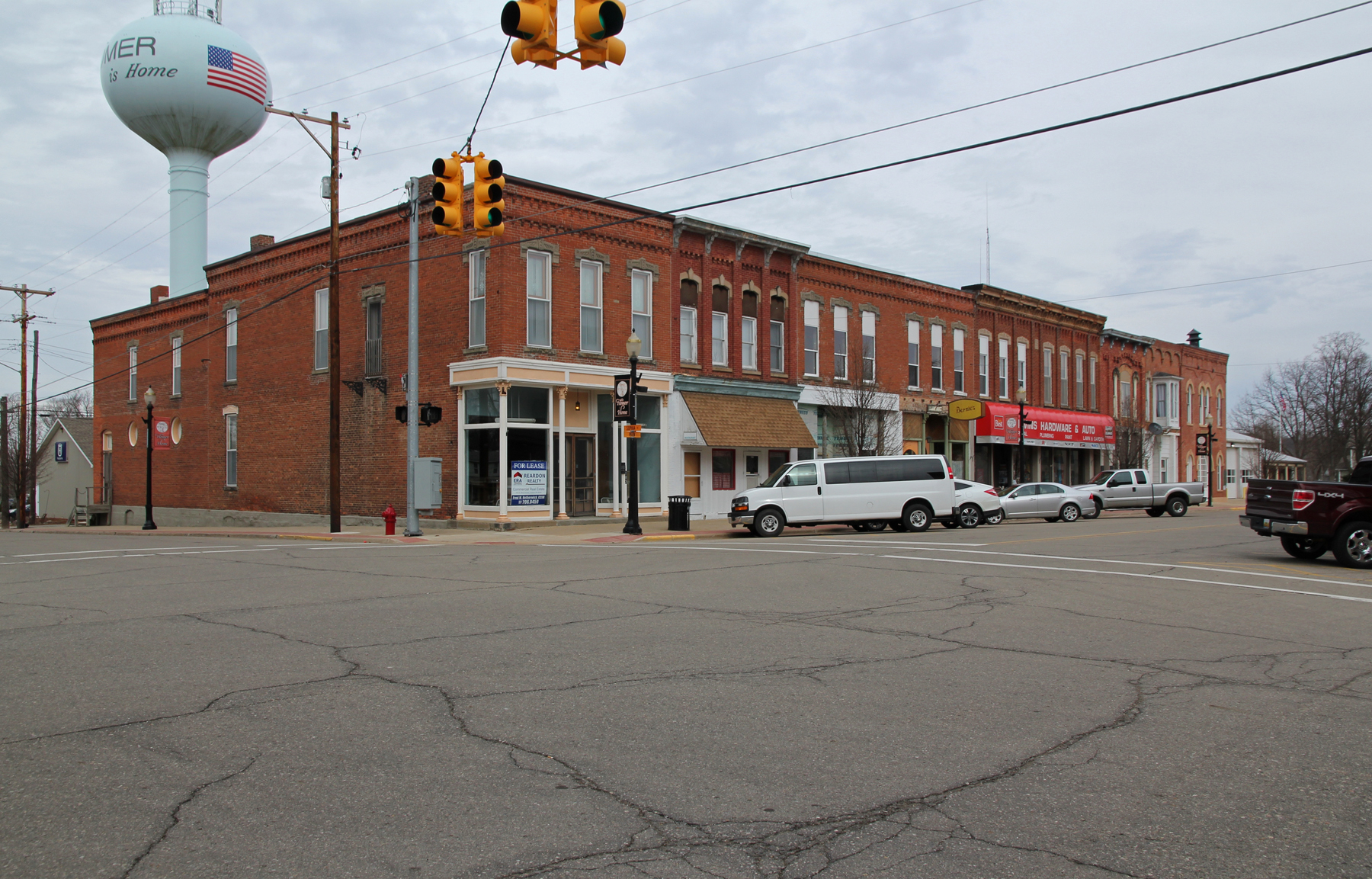
- Interactive map
- Location: Roughly bounded by Leigh, Burgess, Hamilton, School, and Byron Sts., Homer, Michigan
- Coordinates: 42°8′39″N 84°48′27″W
- Area: 86 acres (35 ha)
- Architectural style: Greek Revival, Italianate, Queen Anne
- NRHP reference No.: 96000805
- Added to NRHP: July 25, 1996

The Homer Village Historic District is a commercial and residential historic district roughly bounded by Leigh, Burgess, Hamilton, School, and Byron Streets in Homer, Michigan. It was listed on the National Register of Historic Places in 1996.

== History ==
The village of Homer was founded in 1832 when Milton Barney of Lyons, New York purchased land here and constructed a saw mill. Barney hired Oshea Wilder to plat a village along what was then the Territorial Road (now M-60). The original village plat was between Platt, Burgess, Burt, and Byron Streets. A commercial district sprang up along Main Street, particularly around the public square, where Barney built a hotel. The area around Homer gradually became settled by farmers, and by 1856, the village had a population of about 350 people. In 1869/70, a rail line was built through the village, and two more lines were built through Homer in the next 15 years, making the village a transportation hum for the area. A fire in 1876 destroyed nearly all the frame commercial buildings in the downtown area, and subsequent structures were constructed of brick or other fireproof materials. The population was nearly 2000 people by 1890.

Construction of new commercial and residential structures to serve this population continued into the 20th century. However, the rise of the automobile affected the village's economy, and growth slowed. The onset of the Great Depression exacerbated the slowdown. The village maintained a population of about 1200 people since that time, limiting additional growth.

== Description ==
The Homer Village Historic District contains much of the original plat of the village of Homer, including the two-block core commercial area, with the surrounding residential areas. The district contain 210 buildings and structures, 188 of which contribute to the historic nature of the district. The commercial section is substantially two-story brick commercial buildings. The most distinctive building is the three-story Lyon block. A public square is located at the western end of the commercial district, and the Cortright-Van Patten Mill formerly stood at the other end. The surrounding residential areas contain a mix of brick and frame houses on large lots along tree-lined streets. Architectural styles include Greek Revival, Italianate, and Queen Anne, along with simpler vernacular versions of the styles.
