= Homer Historic District (Homer, Louisiana) =

Historic district in Louisiana, United States

- U.S. National Register of Historic Places
- U.S. Historic district
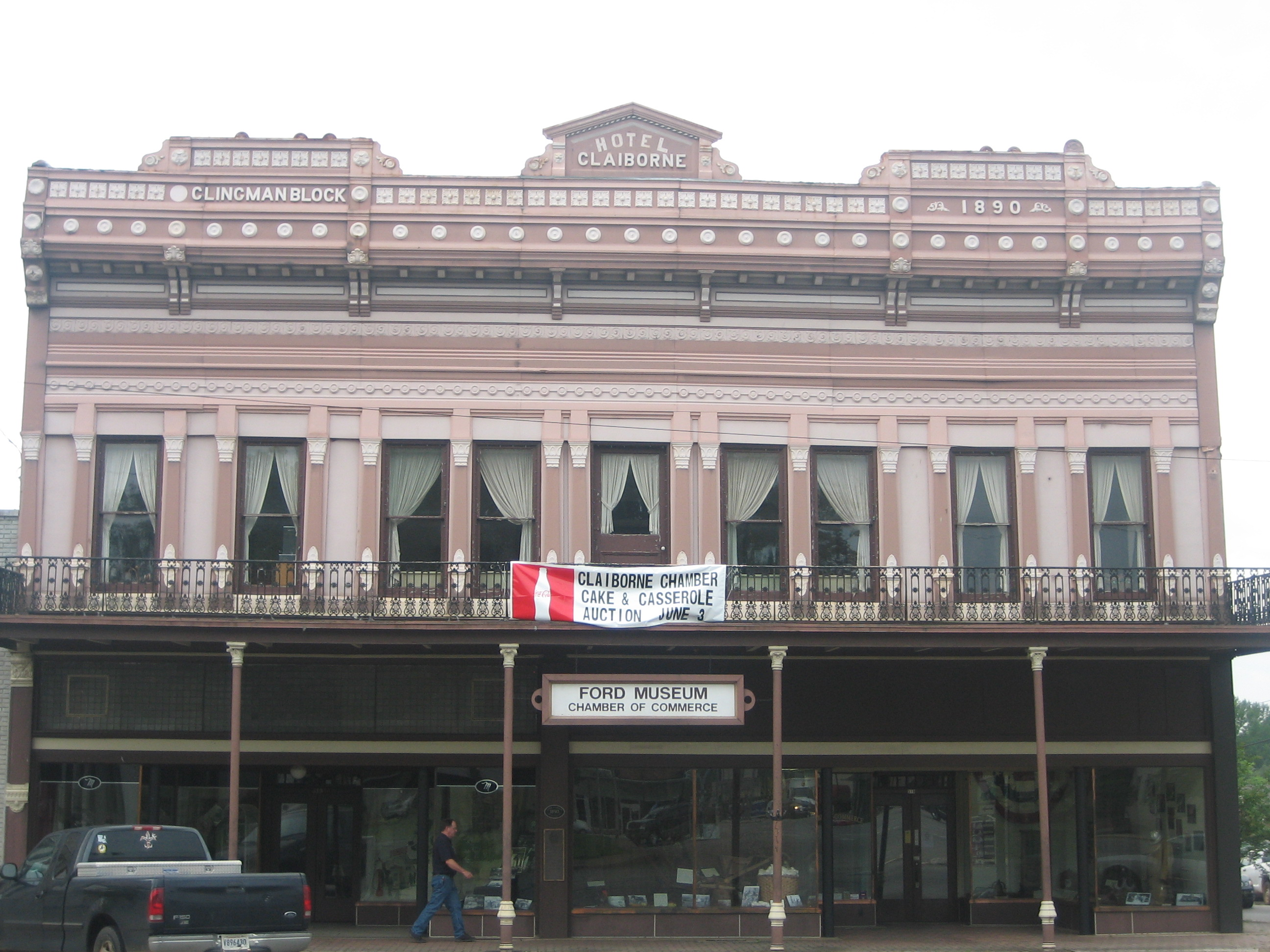
- Hotel Claiborne (Maritsky Building), now hosting the Ford Museum

- Location within Louisiana Location within the United States

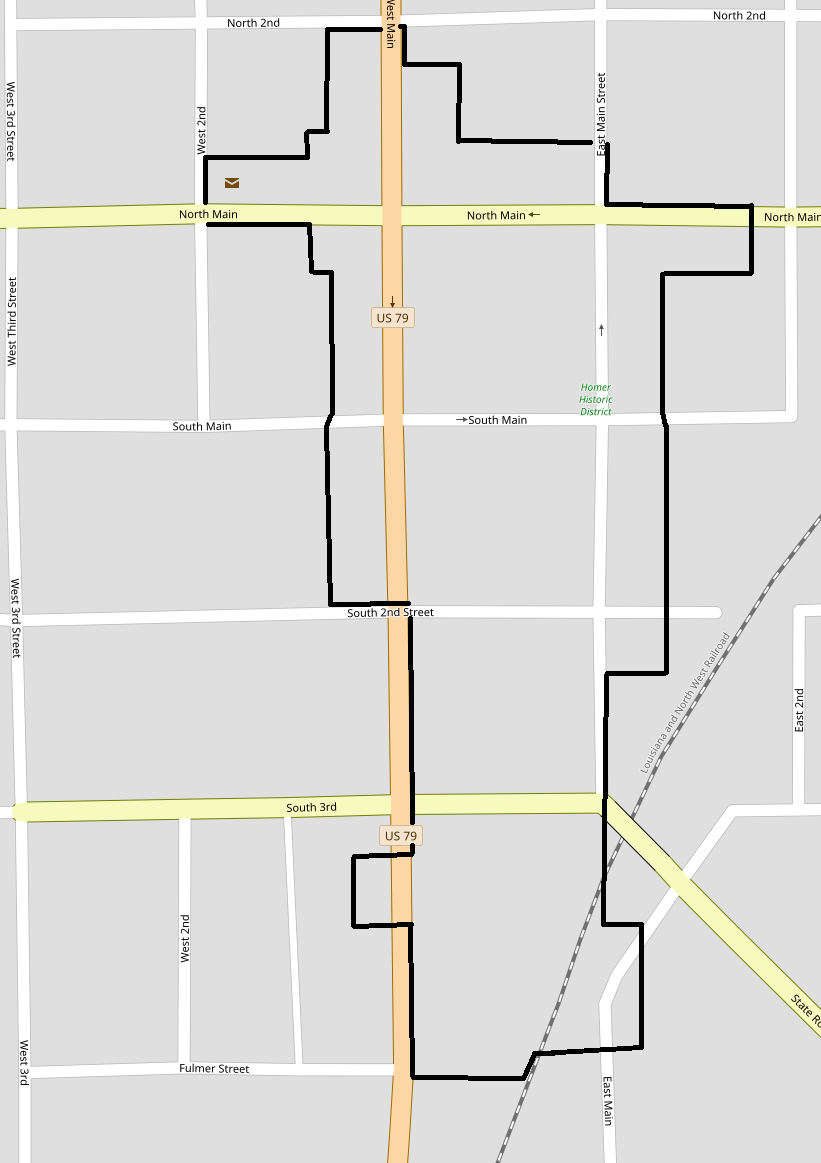
- Location: Roughly bounded by North 2nd Street, East Main Street, South 3rd Street, Fulmer Street Third, West Main Street and West 2nd Street, Homer, Louisiana
- Coordinates: 32°47′26″N 93°03′18″W
- Area: 13 acres (5.3 ha)
- Architectural style: Italianate, Vernacular Commercial
- NRHP reference No.: 86001994
- Added to NRHP: August 28, 1986

The Homer Historic District, a 13 acres (5.3 ha) historic district in Homer in Claiborne Parish, Louisiana, was listed on the National Register of Historic Places in 1986.

The district includes 56 buildings, mainly commercial buildings, of which 39 are contributing buildings, set around a courthouse square and along an adjacent railroad corridor. The contributing properties date from c.1890 to 1936, except for the 1860 Claiborne Parish Courthouse.

All of the buildings located south of South 3rd Street, except Automobile Dealership which is still standing, seem to have disappeared at some time before 2012. (Note: Checking satellite imagery and street views of the area it seems that Gas Station #1 was still standing in February 2012 and was no more in existence in October of the same year. All other buildings were removed earlier.)

== Contributing Properties ==
The historical district contains a total of 39 contributing properties, built between 1860 and 1935:

- IOOF Lodge Building, 417 North Main Street, 32°47′30″N 93°03′14″W, built c.1925.
- Building at 518 East Main Street, 32°47′30″N 93°03′16″W, built c.1925.
- Building at 500 East Main Street (#1), 32°47′29″N 93°03′16″W, built c.1900.
- Building at 500 East Main Street (#2), 32°47′29″N 93°03′16″W, built c.1900.
- Homer City Hall, 400 East Main Street, 32°47′28″N 93°03′16″W, built c.1930.
- School Board Annex, 32°47′26″N 93°03′16″W, built c.1925.
- Warehouse #1, 32°47′26″N 93°03′16″W, built c.1925.
- Railroad Shop and Shed, 32°47′20″N 93°03′17″W, built c.1920. No more existing.
- Railroad Office - Warehouse, 32°47′18″N 93°03′19″W, built c.1920. No more existing.
- Railroad Depot, 32°47′19″N 93°03′19″W, built c.1910. No more existing.
- Commercial Building #1, 32°47′21″N 93°03′21″W, built c.1925. No more existing.
- Gas Station #1, 32°47′21″N 93°03′19″W, built c.1925. No more existing.
- Automobile Dealership, 32°47′21″N 93°03′18″W, built c.1930.
- Commercial Building #2, 32°47′22″N 93°03′19″W, built c.1925. No more existing.
- First Baptist Church, 406 West Main Street, 32°47′24″N 93°03′19″W, built c.1925.
- Frame Residence, now part of First Baptist Church, 32°47′25″N 93°03′17″W, built c.1920.
- Building at 501-503 South Main Street, 32°47′28″N 93°03′17″W, built c.1925.
- Building at 505-507 South Main Street, 32°47′28″N 93°03′17″W, built c.1890.
- Building at 511 South Main Street, 32°47′28″N 93°03′18″W, built c.1935.
- Building at 513 South Main Street, 32°47′28″N 93°03′18″W, built c.1930.
- Building at 515 South Main Street, 32°47′28″N 93°03′19″W, built c.1925.
- Hotel Claiborne, also known as Maritsky Building, now hosting the Ford Museum, at 517-519 South Main Street, 32°47′28″N 93°03′19″W, built 1890.
- Building at 419 West Main Street, 32°47′27″N 93°03′20″W, built c.1925.
- Building at 421-423 West Main Street, 32°47′27″N 93°03′20″W, built c.1925.
- Building at 425 West Main Street, 32°47′27″N 93°03′20″W, built c.1925.
- Building at 427 West Main Street, 32°47′27″N 93°03′20″W, built c.1925.
- Commercial Building #3, 32°47′29″N 93°03′21″W, built c.1920.
- Homer National Bank Building, 507 West Main Street, 32°47′30″N 93°03′21″W, built between 1909 and 1914.
- Building at 515 West Main Street, 32°47′31″N 93°03′21″W, built c.1900.
- Homer Post Office, 612 North Main Street, 32°47′32″N 93°03′22″W, built 1935.
- Building at 604-608 North Main Street, 32°47′27″N 93°03′20″W, built c.1910.
- Gas Station #2, 32°47′33″N 93°03′21″W, built c.1925.
- Commercial Building #4, 32°47′33″N 93°03′19″W, built c.1925.
- Commercial Building #5, 32°47′32″N 93°03′19″W, built c.1925.
- Homer Drugs Building, 522 North Main Street, 32°47′32″N 93°03′19″W, built c.1890.
- Masonic Hall, 512 North Main Street, 32°47′32″N 93°03′18″W, built 1922.
- Building at 500 North Main Street, 32°47′32″N 93°03′17″W, built c.1920.
- Claiborne Parish Courthouse, 32°47′30″N 93°03′18″W, built 1860 and also individually listed on the National Register of Historic Places.

== See also ==
- National Register of Historic Places listings in Claiborne Parish, Louisiana
