= Ray Moore =

Ray Moore may refer to:

- Ray Moore (broadcaster) (1942–1989), British broadcaster
- Ray Moore (comics) (1905–1984), comic strip artist and co-creator of The Phantom
- Ray Moore (drag racer), American drag racer
- Raymond Moore (tennis) (born 1946), former South African tennis player
- Ray Moore (baseball) (1926–1995), former pitcher in Major League Baseball

== See also ==
- Raymond Moore (disambiguation)
- Roy Moore (disambiguation)
