= Raymond Moore =

Raymond Moore may refer to:

- Raymond Moore (photographer) (1920–1987), English art photographer
- Raymond Moore (tennis) (born 1946), former tennis player from South Africa
- Raymond Cecil Moore (1892–1974), American geologist and paleontologist
- Raymond John Moore (1914–1988), Canadian botanist
- Raymond P. Moore (born 1953), United States district judge
- Raymond Moore, defendant in United States v. Moore (1973)

== See also ==
- Ray Moore (disambiguation)
