= David Wade (general) =

American lieutenant general

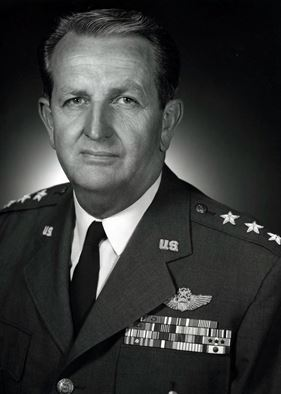
- Born: June 15, 1911; Minden, Louisiana
- Died: May 11, 1990 (aged 78); San Antonio, Texas
- Burial place: Fort Sam Houston National Cemetery
- Military career
- Allegiance: United States
- Branch: United States Army (1935–47); United States Air Force (1947–67)
- Service years: 1935–1967
- Rank: Lieutenant General
- Commands: Eighth Air Force; Second Air Force; 16th Air Expeditionary Task Force; 1st Missile Division; 21st Air Division; 57th Air Division; 92d Bombardment Wing; 303d Bombardment Wing; 98th Bombardment Wing; 19th Bombardment Group; 9th Bombardment Group; 34th Combat Crew Training School
- Conflicts: World War II; Korean War; Vietnam War
- Awards: Legion of Merit (2); Distinguished Flying Cross; Soldier's Medal; Air Medal (2); Air Force Commendation Medal

David Wade (June 15, 1911 – May 11, 1990) was a decorated American lieutenant general from three wars who after military retirement on March 1, 1967, served in two appointed positions in the state government of his native Louisiana. The David Wade Correctional Center, a prison in Claiborne Parish, is named in his honor.

== Background ==
Wade was born in Minden in Webster Parish, which had been created in 1871 from Claiborne Parish. He was reared in the Holly Springs community, known today primarily for a Baptist church and a cemetery located off U.S. Highway 79 between Minden and Homer in Claiborne Parish. He attended the long since defunct Harris High School and Homer Junior College and procured the Bachelor of Science in engineering from Louisiana Tech University in Ruston in Lincoln Parish. He entered the United States Army and served thereafter in World War II, the Korean War, and the Vietnam War.

== Military, 1935–1954 ==
In February 1935, Wade launched what developed into a 32-year military career when he enlisted as a cadet in the United States Army Air Corps, the forerunner of the Air Force. He underwent pilot training at Randolph Field in San Antonio, Texas. He was an until November 1941, when he was named assistant director and then director of training at the U.S. Army base in Big Spring in Howard County in West Texas, a position which he retained until October 1943. For that point forward, Wade was constantly reassigned, usually every two to four years, to different locations by the Army and later the Air Force. In the fall of 1943, he assumed new duties as commanding officer of the 34th Combat Crew Training School and then the 9th Bomb Group in Blythe, California, and Walla Walla, Washington, respectively, until March 1945. At that time, Wade became deputy commander of the 320th Bomb Wing in Sacramento, California.

In August 1945, Wade began a 26-month tour of duty in the South Pacific. He was the commander of the 9th Bombardment Group in the Marianas and the Philippines until April 1947. At that time, for seven months he commanded the 19th Bombardment Group on Guam. He returned to the United States in November 1947 and entered the Armed Forces Staff College at Norfolk, Virginia, from which he graduated in July 1948, when he was named the vice commander of the U.S. Air Force Security Service at Brooks Air Force Base, which necessitated his return to San Antonio, where he remained until June 1950. Then Wade returned to California to become the deputy commander of the 93d Bombardment Wing at Castle Air Force Base near San Francisco.

In April 1951, Wade was sent to Japan to command the 98th Bombardment Wing. He selected the targets in the strategic bombing of communist North Korea. He remained in Japan until September 1951, when he assumed the command of the 303d Bombardment Wing at Davis-Monthan Air Force Base in Tucson, Arizona. On February 18, 1952, he was named commander of the 92d Bombardment Wing at Fairchild Air Force Base near Spokane, Washington. Nine months later he took command of the 57th Air Division at Fairchild.

In April 1954, Wade was named commander of the 21st Air Division with headquarters at Forbes Air Force Base near Topeka, Kansas. He remained there a full year, when he was reassigned as inspector general at the headquarters of the Strategic Air Command at Offutt Air Force Base near Omaha, Nebraska. In July 1956, he was promoted to the position of SAC chief of staff.

== Military, 1958–1967 ==
On January 1, 1958, Wade was assigned as commander of the 1st Missile Division at Vandenberg Air Force Base near Lompoc, California. There he commanded the first operational missile unit in Air Force history. His commission was two-fold: (1) maintain operational capability with intercontinental ballistic missiles, and (2) establish operational readiness training for the missile crews of the SAC missile sites. He hence worked to develop the Discoverer, Samos, and Midas orbiting satellite programs.

From Vandenberg, Wade was sent in April 1961 to Torrejón Air Base near Madrid, Spain, where he commanded SAC's 16th Air Expeditionary Task Force. He received his promotion to lieutenant general on August 1, 1963, and assumed command of SAC's Second Air Force with headquarters then at Barksdale Air Force Base in Bossier City, some fifty miles west of his hometown of Homer, Louisiana. Then on August 1, 1966, he assumed command of the Eighth Air Force at Westover Air Force Base near Springfield, Massachusetts. As the commander at Westover, he was responsible for bombers, tankers, and missiles located south from Goose Bay, Labrador, to Ramey Air Force Base in Aguadilla, Puerto Rico, and extending westward from Loring Air Force Base in Aroostook County, Maine, to Clinton-Sherman Air Force Base near Clinton, Oklahoma.

Wade received the Legion of Merit with oak leaf cluster, Distinguished Flying Cross, Soldier's Medal, Air Medal with oak leaf cluster and the Air Force Commendation Medal.

== Later years ==
After Wade's military retirement, Governor John McKeithen appointed him in 1967 as the director of the Louisiana Department of Public Safety and Corrections, with authority over both state police and prisons. From 1968 to 1972, he was the adjutant general of the Louisiana National Guard.

In 1972, Wade got into an open dispute with Democratic State Representative Dorothy Mae Taylor of New Orleans, the first African-American female to serve in the Louisiana legislature. Wade called Taylor "a real phony" and accused her of seeking media attention by inciting trouble at the Louisiana State Penitentiary in Angola as well as the parish prison in Orleans Parish. Wade said that Taylor catered to a black militant group with an eye toward her own political agenda.

Wade died in 1990 at the age of seventy-eight. He and his wife, Dorothy, donated memorabilia to the Herbert S. Ford Memorial Museum in Homer, Louisiana, which he considered to have been his hometown. On display are the general's portrait, flags, medals, and awards as well as various weapons from World War I to the Vietnam era, including a World War II "Liberator," a rare pistol meant to be discarded after a single use.
