= Homer, Louisiana =

- Town
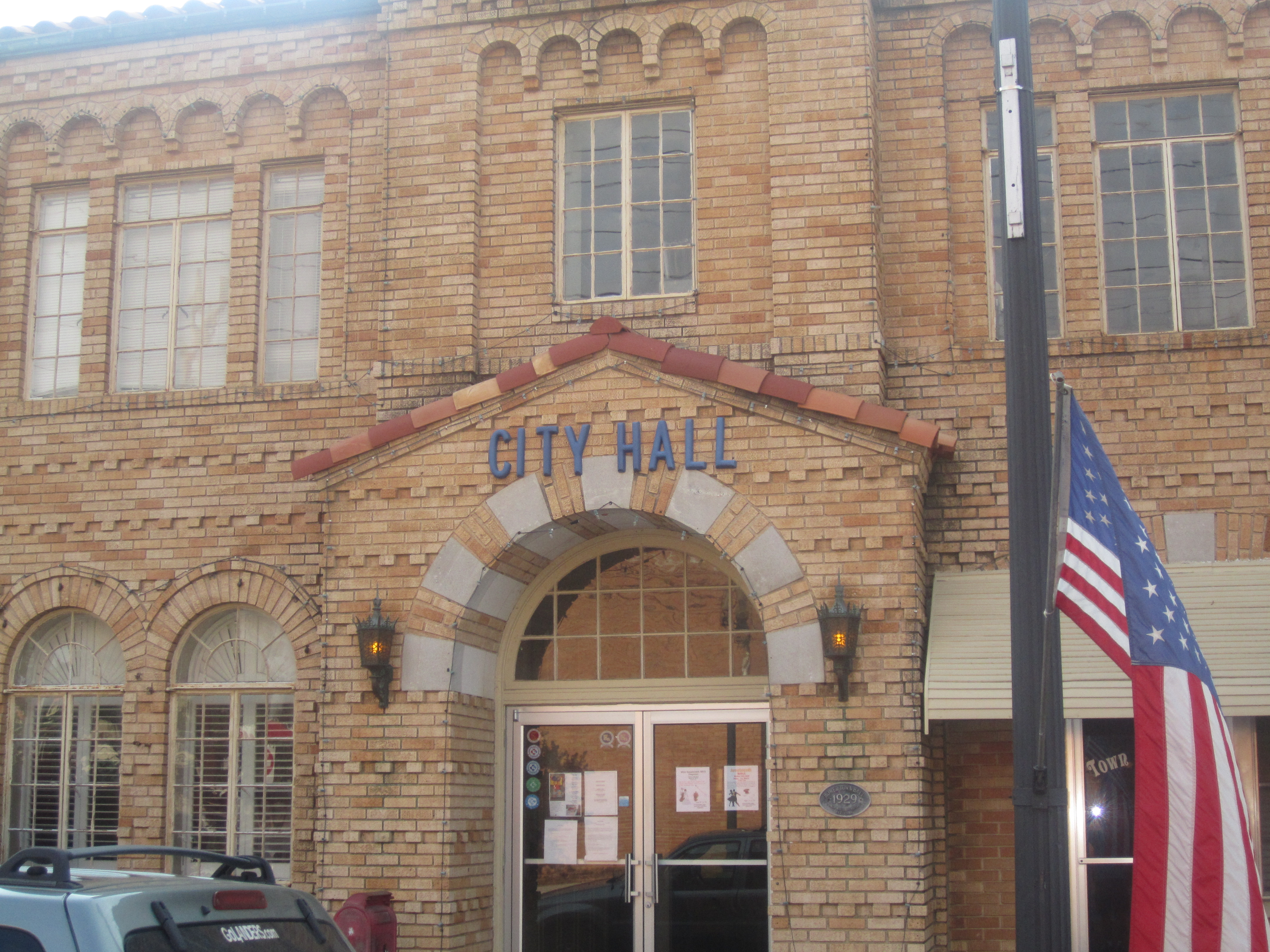
- Homer City Hall (built 1928)

- Location of Homer in Claiborne Parish, Louisiana.

- Location of Louisiana in the United States
- Coordinates: 32°47′35″N 93°03′30″W
- Country: United States
- State: Louisiana
- Parish: Claiborne
- Named after: Homer

Area
  - Total: 4.66 sq mi (12.07 km^{2})
  - Land: 4.65 sq mi (12.05 km^{2})
  - Water: 0.0039 sq mi (0.01 km^{2})
- Elevation: 292 ft (89 m)

Population (2020)
  - Total: 2,747
  - Density: 590.3/sq mi (227.93/km^{2})
- Time zone: UTC-6 (CST)
  - Summer (DST): UTC-5 (CDT)
- ZIP Code: 71040
- Area code: 318
- FIPS code: 22-35870
- GNIS feature ID: 2405858
- Website: www.townofhomer.com

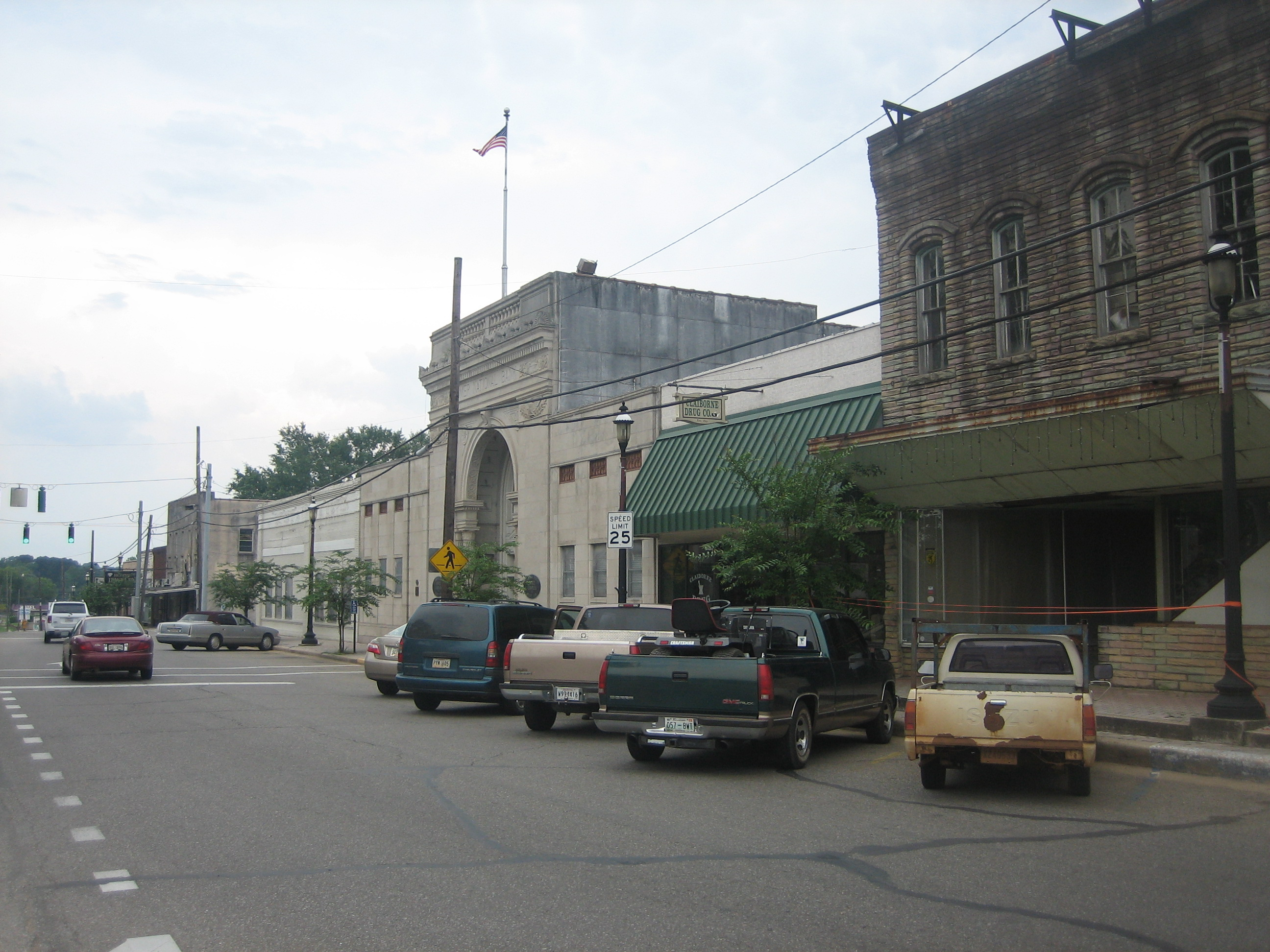
Downtown Homer is centered about the Claiborne Parish Courthouse, constructed in 1860.

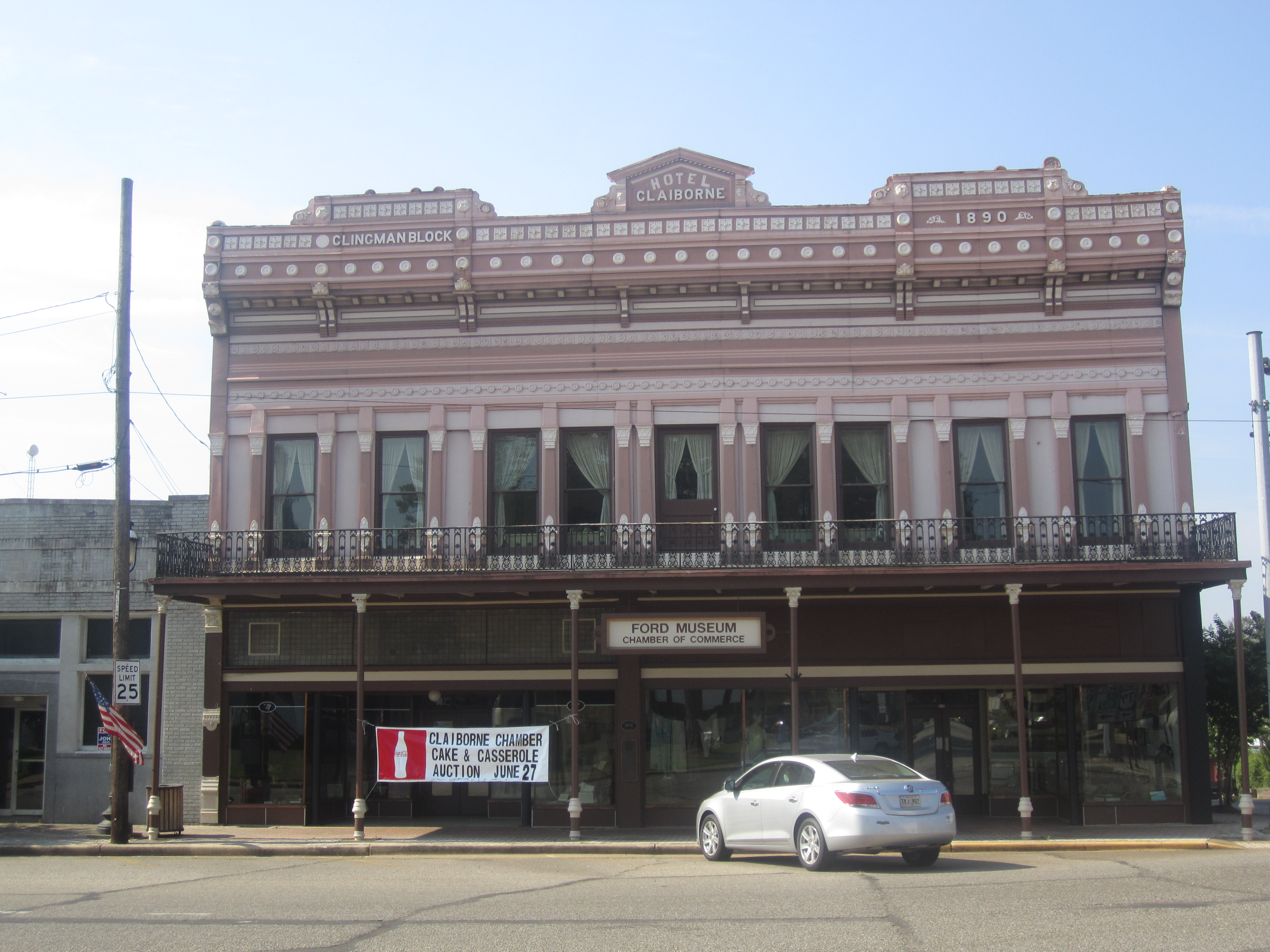
The Herbert S. Ford Memorial Museum and the Homer Chamber of Commerce jointly occupy the building of the former Claiborne Hotel building.

Homer is a town in and the parish seat of Claiborne Parish in northern Louisiana, United States. As of the 2020 census, Homer had a population of 2,747. Named for the Greek poet Homer, the town was laid out around the Courthouse Square in 1850 by Frank Vaughn. The present-day brick courthouse, built in the Greek Revival style of architecture, is one of only four pre-Civil War courthouses in Louisiana still in use. The building, completed in 1860, was accepted by the Claiborne Parish Police Jury on July 20, 1861, at a cost of $12,304.36, and is on the National Register of Historic Places. The other courthouses are in St. Francisville, St. Martinville and Thibodaux.

== History ==
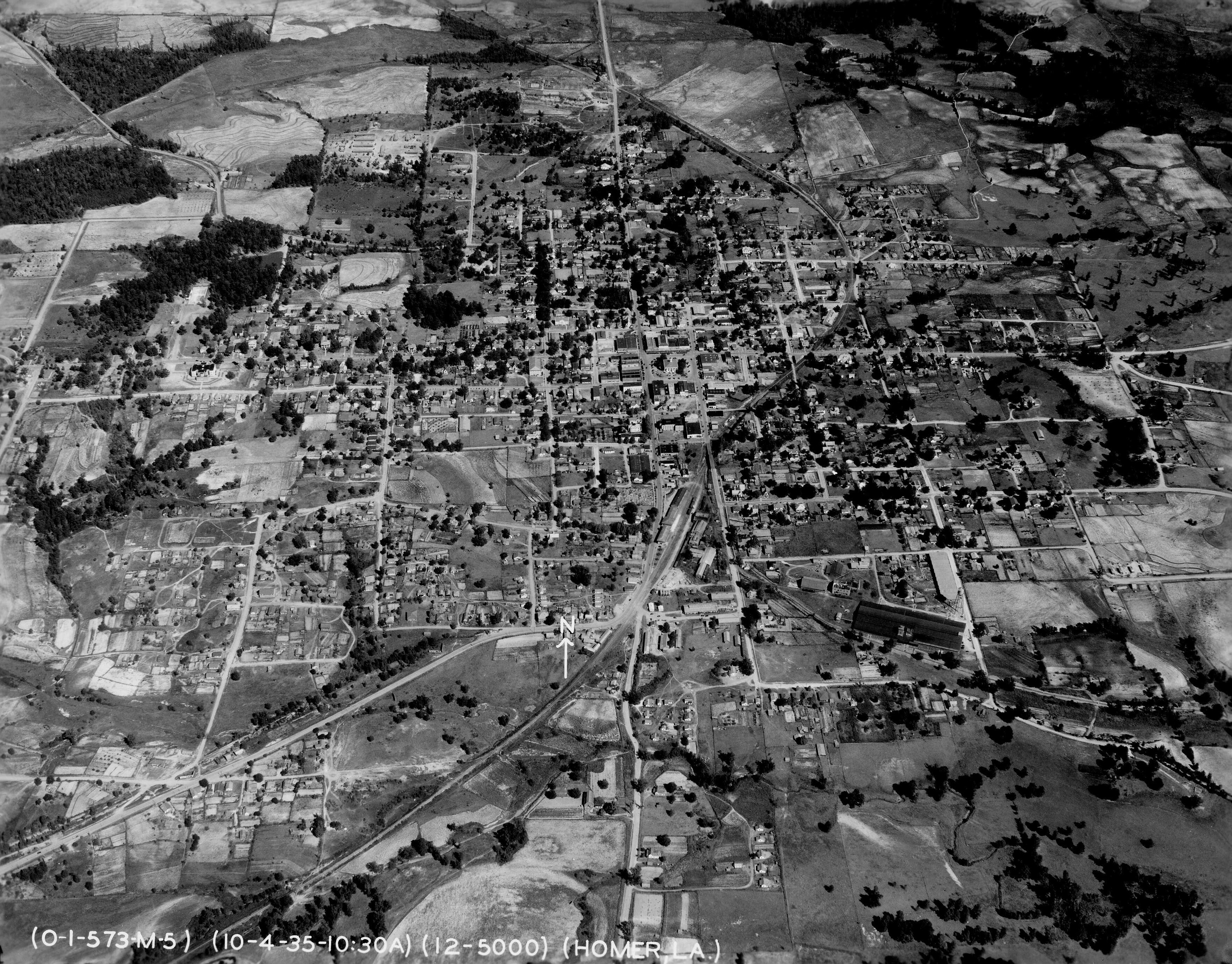
Homer in 1935

The town was once the home of Homer College (also known as Homer Colored College), a private school for African American students (1880 to 1918) and offered bachelor's degrees and masters degrees.

The Herbert S. Ford Memorial Museum operates across from the parish courthouse in the former Claiborne Hotel (completed 1890). The museum claims the oldest compressed bale of cotton in existence in the United States. This cotton display is believed to have been baled about 1930. Adjacent to the cotton exhibit is the "Black Gold", a replica of an oilfield roughneck—a general laborer worker who loading and unloads cargo from crane baskets and keeps the drilling equipment clean—employed in the early 1930s by the Sinclair Oil and Gas Company. The exhibit has a recording which explains how a farm family, growing mostly cotton and corn faced great economic travail in Mississippi but relocated to Claiborne Parish to take advantage of the oil and natural gas boom. "Oil changed our lives forever. We owe a lot to the men, mud, and mules that made it happen," concludes the recorded message. In 1921, oil was discovered in Homer; in 1921, another strike followed in Haynesville in northern Claiborne Parish. The boom continued through the 1930s and brought many customers to the then booming Hotel Claiborne, which had been established in 1890 and declared a state historic site in 1984.

Former Homer Mayor Alecia Smith was sentenced in 2017 after she pleaded guilty to two counts of malfeasance in office. She diverted Homer municipal funds to personal use and falsified public records. Her two five-year sentences were deferred, and she was instead placed on probation. She must pay a $1,000 fine and repay more than $6,000 to the municipality. Louisiana Attorney General Jeff Landry said that department will "not stand for corrupt public officials. ... The people of our state deserve better and should expect more out of those who are appointed or elected to serve."

== Geography ==
According to the United States Census Bureau, the town has a total area of 4.6 square miles (12 km^{2}), of which 4.6 square miles (12 km^{2}) is land and 0.22% is water.

=== Climate ===
The climate in this area is characterized by hot, humid summers and generally mild to cool winters. According to the Köppen Climate Classification system, Homer has a humid subtropical climate, abbreviated "Cfa" on climate maps.

Climate data for Homer, Louisiana (1991–2020 normals, extremes 1893–present)
Month	Jan	Feb	Mar	Apr	May	Jun	Jul	Aug	Sep	Oct	Nov	Dec	Year
Record high °F (°C)	83 (28)	85 (29)	90 (32)	93 (34)	98 (37)	102 (39)	105 (41)	107 (42)	109 (43)	100 (38)	88 (31)	82 (28)	109 (43)
Mean maximum °F (°C)	73.8 (23.2)	76.6 (24.8)	82.4 (28.0)	86.0 (30.0)	89.9 (32.2)	94.3 (34.6)	97.8 (36.6)	98.8 (37.1)	95.9 (35.5)	88.8 (31.6)	80.3 (26.8)	75.3 (24.1)	99.3 (37.4)
Mean daily maximum °F (°C)	55.6 (13.1)	59.7 (15.4)	67.5 (19.7)	75.2 (24.0)	81.9 (27.7)	88.6 (31.4)	91.7 (33.2)	92.0 (33.3)	86.9 (30.5)	76.6 (24.8)	65.3 (18.5)	57.5 (14.2)	74.9 (23.8)
Daily mean °F (°C)	43.8 (6.6)	47.5 (8.6)	54.6 (12.6)	62.2 (16.8)	70.4 (21.3)	77.5 (25.3)	80.8 (27.1)	80.5 (26.9)	74.7 (23.7)	63.4 (17.4)	52.8 (11.6)	45.8 (7.7)	62.8 (17.1)
Mean daily minimum °F (°C)	32.0 (0.0)	35.3 (1.8)	41.7 (5.4)	49.2 (9.6)	58.8 (14.9)	66.4 (19.1)	69.9 (21.1)	69.0 (20.6)	62.4 (16.9)	50.2 (10.1)	40.3 (4.6)	34.1 (1.2)	50.8 (10.4)
Mean minimum °F (°C)	17.9 (−7.8)	23.1 (−4.9)	26.1 (−3.3)	34.4 (1.3)	45.2 (7.3)	58.1 (14.5)	64.1 (17.8)	62.1 (16.7)	49.7 (9.8)	36.1 (2.3)	26.4 (−3.1)	21.2 (−6.0)	15.9 (−8.9)
Record low °F (°C)	−1 (−18)	0 (−18)	11 (−12)	27 (−3)	33 (1)	47 (8)	53 (12)	50 (10)	36 (2)	25 (−4)	15 (−9)	1 (−17)	−1 (−18)
Average precipitation inches (mm)	5.15 (131)	5.26 (134)	5.68 (144)	5.89 (150)	4.74 (120)	4.04 (103)	4.02 (102)	3.28 (83)	3.73 (95)	4.64 (118)	4.64 (118)	5.92 (150)	56.99 (1,448)
Average snowfall inches (cm)	0.3 (0.76)	0.3 (0.76)	0.1 (0.25)	0.0 (0.0)	0.0 (0.0)	0.0 (0.0)	0.0 (0.0)	0.0 (0.0)	0.0 (0.0)	0.0 (0.0)	0.0 (0.0)	0.0 (0.0)	0.7 (1.77)
Average precipitation days (≥ 0.01 in)	9.6	9.3	9.8	8.1	8.7	8.5	8.1	6.7	6.1	7.0	8.3	9.7	99.9
Average snowy days (≥ 0.1 in)	0.0	0.2	0.0	0.0	0.0	0.0	0.0	0.0	0.0	0.0	0.0	0.0	0.2
Source: NOAA

== Demographics ==
Historical population
Census	Pop.	Note	%±
1850	418		—
1860	1,451		247.1%
1870	80		−94.5%
1880	718		797.5%
1890	1,132		57.7%
1900	1,157		2.2%
1910	1,855		60.3%
1920	3,305		78.2%
1930	2,909		−12.0%
1940	3,497		20.2%
1950	4,749		35.8%
1960	4,665		−1.8%
1970	4,483		−3.9%
1980	4,307		−3.9%
1990	4,152		−3.6%
2000	3,788		−8.8%
2010	3,237		−14.5%
2020	2,747		−15.1%
2025 (est.)	2,520	▼	−8.3%
U.S. Decennial Census

The population of Homer was 2,747 in 2020.

Homer racial composition as of 2020
Race	Number	Percentage
White (non-Hispanic)	703	25.59%
Black or African American (non-Hispanic)	1,884	68.58%
Native American	15	0.55%
Asian	14	0.51%
Other/Mixed	90	3.28%
Hispanic or Latino	41	1.49%

As of the 2020 United States census, there were 2,747 people, 1,268 households, and 777 families residing in the town.

== Government and infrastructure ==
The United States Postal Service operates the Homer Post Office. Zip Code: 71040

Louisiana Department of Public Safety and Corrections operates the David Wade Correctional Center in an unincorporated section of Claiborne Parish near Homer.

== Education ==
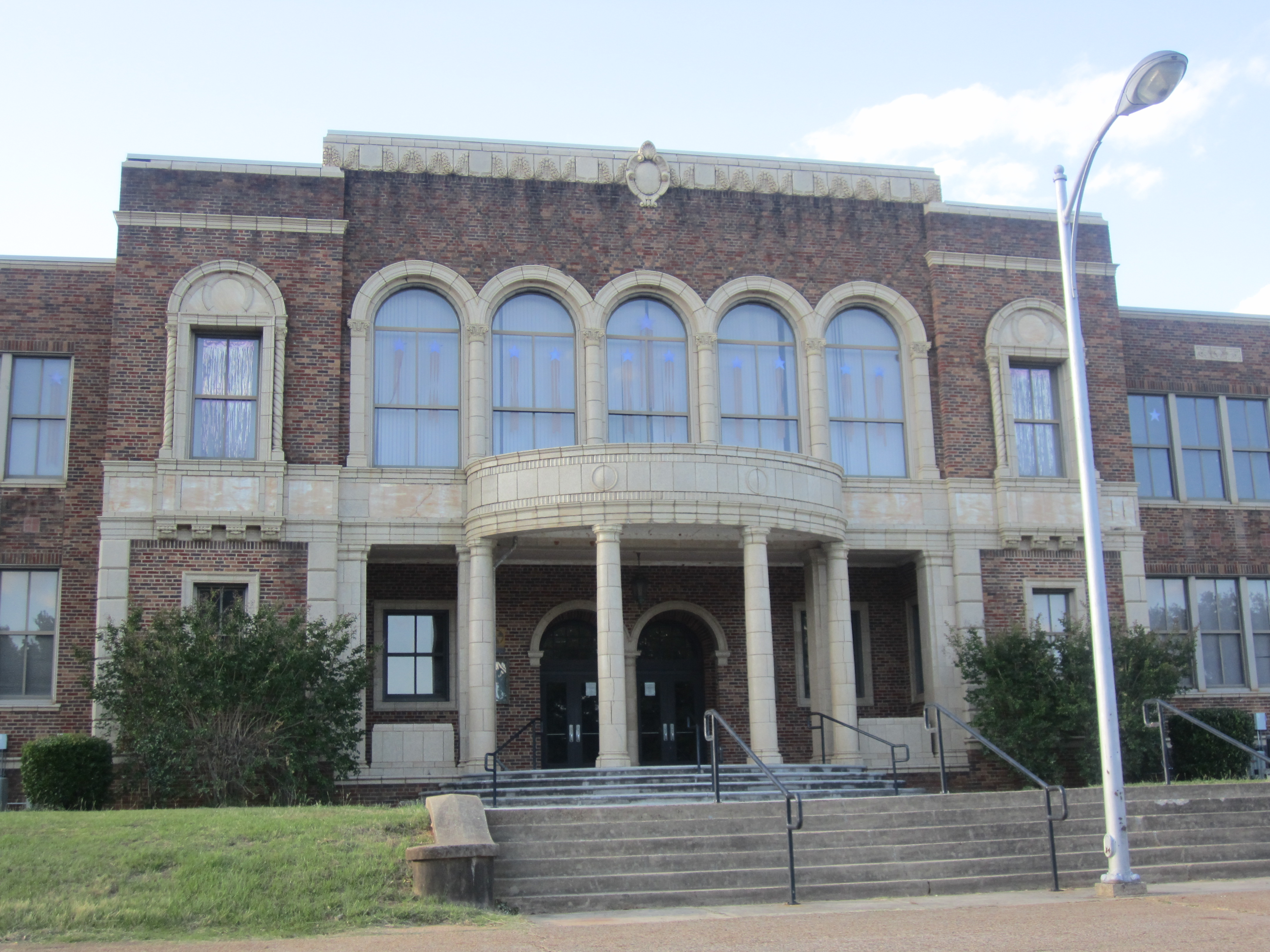
Homer High School

The Claiborne Parish School Board is the school district for the entire parish. It operates Homer Elementary School, Homer Junior High School, and Homer High School.

The Homer area is also served by Claiborne Academy, a privately funded K thru 12 school in an unincorporated area. It has been serving the Claiborne Parish area since 1970, around the time public high schools were integrated. Many prominent citizens and local civic leaders in Homer and nearby Haynesville, are graduates of Claiborne Academy.

== Notable people ==
- James Andrews, sports physician and orthopedic surgeon
- William Jasper Blackburn, mayor, U.S. Representative, and state senator
- Cheryl Ford, WNBA Rookie of the Year Award and WNBA championship
- Milton Joseph Cunningham, attorney, state legislator and state attorney general
- Bettye Davis, Alaska state representative, social worker, and nurse
- Joe LeSage, Shreveport attorney, state senator and former Louisiana State University supervisor
- Paul Lowe, member of the American Football League All-Time Team
- James T. McCalman, state senator and Homer businessman
- Danny Roy Moore, state senator, graduated from Homer High School
- William M. Rainach, member state senate and house 1940-1960. Founded Claiborne Electric Coop, procured Homer Airport, Experimental Station, Lake Claiborne, Homer North Industrial Site, north Homer bypass from La. 9 to La. 79.

- Bobby Rush, Grammy Award-winning blues musician, composer and singer
- Larry Sale, sheriff of Claiborne Parish from 1936 to 1944, decorated soldier of World War I
- Gaynell Tinsley, football player at LSU and the Chicago Cardinals
- David Wade, Lieutenant General of the United States Air Force, considered Homer as his hometown.
- Von Wafer, professional basketball player
