= Cortright-Van Patten Mill =

- Cortright- H. Van Patten Co. Mill
- U.S. National Register of Historic Places
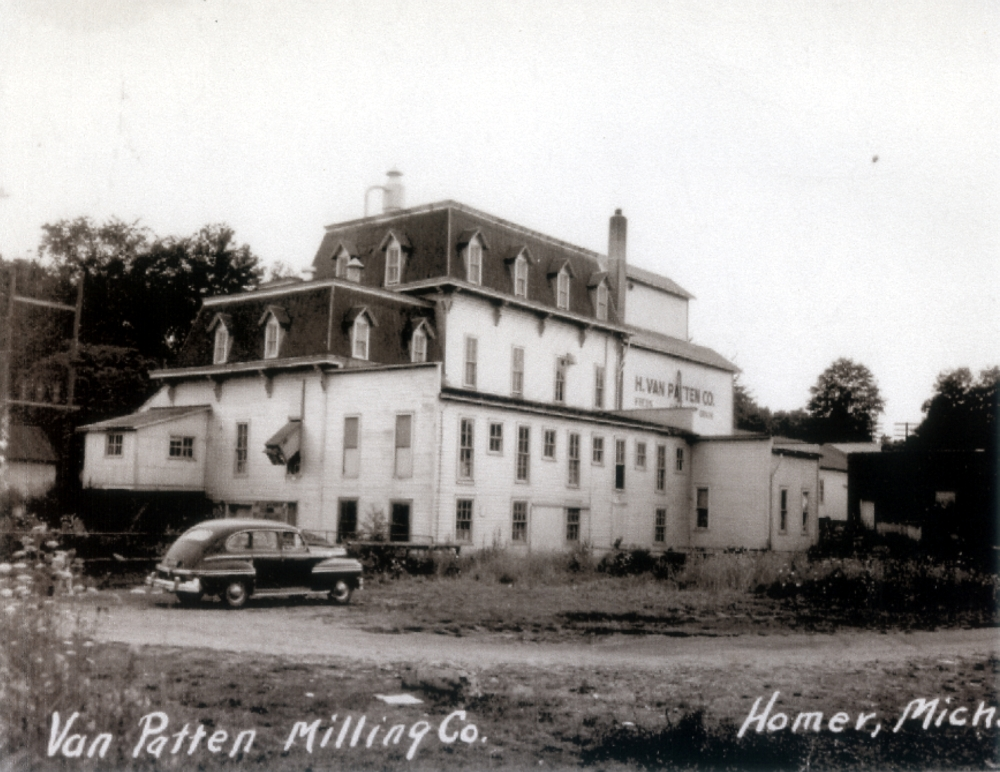
- Interactive map
- Location: 109 Byron St., Homer, Michigan
- Coordinates: 42°08′47″N 84°48′10″W
- Area: 2 acres (0.81 ha)
- Built: 1887
- Built by: George A. McCartney
- Demolished: May 16, 2010
- NRHP reference No.: 79001150
- Added to NRHP: August 31, 1979

The Cortright- H. Van Patten Co. Mill was a grist mill located at 109 Byron Street in Homer, Michigan. It was listed on the National Register of Historic Places in 1979. It was destroyed by fire on May 17, 2010.

== History ==
The first mill in Homer was constructed about 1837 by Leon Barney and was likely located near the location of the later Cortright- H. Van Patten Co. Mill. In the 1850s, Cornelius Cuykendall Cortright moved from New York state to Michigan, settling first in Hillsdale County, then Branch County before moving to a location near Homer. In 1886, the original mill burned down. Cortright and his son David formed the firm of C. C. Cortright and Son, and in 1887 had the main section of this flour mill constructed. The Cortrights hired George A. McCartney of Homer as the contractor. A substantial addition was made to the original mill in about 1910. Cortright's son, David W. Cortright, also owned a farm in the area and operated the mill in Homer.

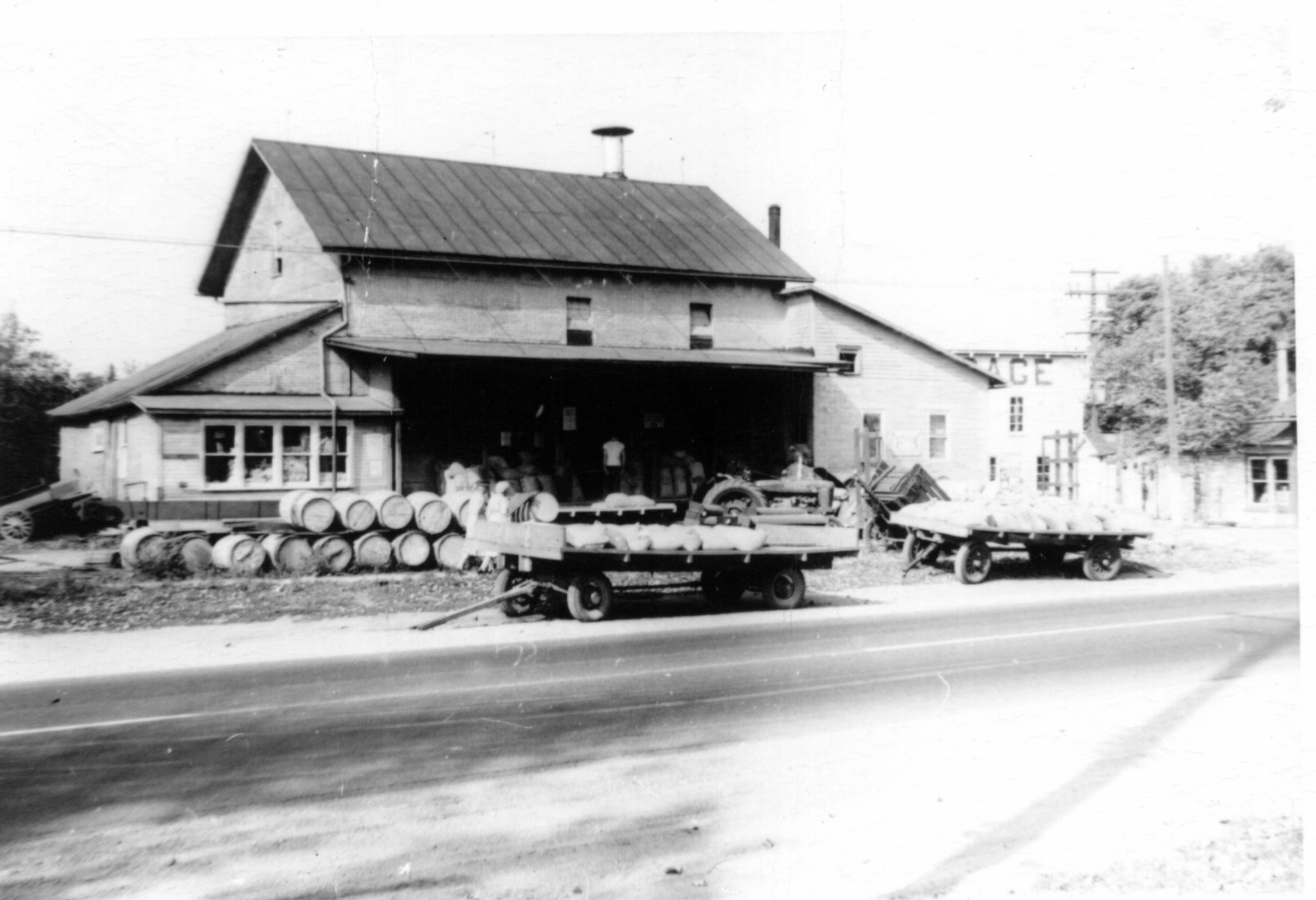
H. Van Patten Co. Allen, Michigan

In 1940, the H. Van Patten Company of Allen, Michigan, purchased the mill from the Cortright family and operated it as a mill until 1970. Leon A. Van Patten, son of Harlow Van Patten, operated the mill until its sale.

In 1974, the mill was sold to James L. Miller, who converted it into a dinner theater known as "True Grist Ltd." The dinner theater operated under various owners until 1987. In 1996, John and Alice Blakemore purchased the mill and opened a restaurant and banquet hall. in 2006, Lance and Susan Cuffle opened the Homer Mill as a restaurant, bar, and haunted house. The mill was destroyed by fire on May 17, 2010.

== Description ==
The Cortright- H. Van Patten Co. Mill was a rambling frame structure, mixing two-, three-, and four-story sections. The structure was clad in novelty siding. The original 1887 mill had bracketed eaves and dormer-pierced mansard roofs. Later portions, added in about 1910, were gable- and shed-roof sections. The mill manufactured Victor Flour until the H. Van Patten Co. converted it to grain storage and custom feed mill for local farmers.
