= Roy Moore (wrestler) =

American wrestling and judo coach (1893–1980)

Roy Moore (1893–1980) was an American wrestling and judo coach, best known for instituting the weight class system in judo. Moore was trained by professional wrestler Frank Gotch. He earned the World Wrestling Championship title in Chicago, beating judoka and wrestler Manjiro "Matty" Matsuda, who later became his judo coach. Moore went on to earn a fifth-degree black belt in judo. He later joined the US Navy.

At the request of judoka Jigoro Kano (1860–1938), Moore implemented the weight class system in judo. He later served as the first Olympic coach for Japan's wrestling team, in 1932. Moore was described as a "forgotten pioneer of judo" in an article written by Haywood Nikosha.

Moore's son, Roy H. Moore Jr., was Japan's Olympic judo wrestling coach.
