= Larry Sale =

American politician

Sheriff of Claiborne Parish, Louisiana, US
- In office 1936–1944

Personal details
- Born: Larry G. Sale; October 19, 1893 Haynesville, Louisiana, US
- Died: October 27, 1977 (aged 84)
- Party: Democratic Party
- Spouse: Eoline B. Sale
- Occupation: Law-enforcement officer

Military service
- Branch/service: United States Army
- Rank: Corporal
- Battles/wars: World War I

Larry G. Sale (October 19, 1893 – October 27, 1977) was a law enforcement officer from Claiborne Parish in north Louisiana considered to have been his state's most decorated soldier of World War I.

== Biographical sketch ==
A native of Haynesville, Sale entered the United States Army in 1917 at the age of twenty-two and reached the rank of corporal with service in France.

From 1920 to 1928, Sale was a deputy under Claiborne Parish Sheriff John Coleman. During this time of national prohibition, Sale attempted to halt illegal whisky being sold in Claiborne Parish during a petroleum boom. He joined the Louisiana Bureau of Investigations under Governor Huey Long On the night of Long's assassination on September 8, 1935, he transported the governor to the hospital in Baton Rouge, only to be told to return Long to the state capitol to find out who had shot him. Long died two days later from ramifications relating to the wound.

A Democrat, Sale was elected sheriff of Claiborne Parish in 1936 and served until 1944. Oddly, another Long bodyguard, Elliot D. Coleman, was elected in 1936 as the sheriff of Tensas Parish in eastern Louisiana and remained in office until his defeat in 1960.

On Sale's death, U.S. Representative Joe D. Waggonner of Louisiana's 4th congressional district penned a letter of condolences to Mrs. Eoline B. Sale (1905-1997), which is displayed at the Herbert S. Ford Memorial Museum in Homer. Waggonner wrote: "Without men of courage and willingness to take up arms to defend America overseas, future generations of Americans would not be able to enjoy the liberties we cherish."

Sale and his wife had Larry Gray Sale and daughter Catherine Onita Sale.
