= Roy H. Moore Jr. =

American Olympic wrestling coach (1921–2018)

Roy H. Moore, Jr, (June 29, 1921–2 January 2018) was an American wrestler and a former Olympic wrestling coach for Japan, after having served a number of years in the US Navy, where he worked as a medic, including at the Battle of Iwo Jima. Moore additionally taught judo at the Naval Training Center in San Diego, California. His father, Roy Moore, was also a judo and wrestling coach.
