= David Wade Correctional Center =

State prison in Louisiana

Coordinates: 32°54′07″N 93°01′10″W

- Interactive map of David Wade Correctional Center
- Location: 670 Bell Hill Road Homer, Louisiana
- Status: open
- Security class: mixed
- Capacity: 1244
- Opened: 1980; expanded 1987
- Managed by: Louisiana Department of Public Safety and Corrections

David Wade Correctional Center (DWCC) is a Louisiana Department of Public Safety and Corrections prison located in an unincorporated area of Claiborne Parish, between Homer and Haynesville, Louisiana. The prison is located near the Louisiana-Arkansas border.

The N-5 Special Management Unit, which as of 2001 holds some 50 prisoners, is a special protection unit for prisoners at risk. The unit houses former prison officials, convicted ex-police officers from New Orleans, contract killers, pedophiles, and young people with life sentences.

Wade opened in 1980. Thirty-nine percent of the beds at Wade are "maximum custody."

As is typical of prisons in rural areas, many of the correctional officers who work at Wade are from the local Haynesville-Homer area.

== History ==
According to police, in July 2017 a prisoner kidnapped the daughter of the warden, and the kidnapping resulted in her death. The inmate died during a shootout with prison guards.

== David Wade ==
The prison is named for Lieutenant General David Wade, who was reared in Claiborne Parish. Wade procured more than a dozen medals in three wars and served in the administration of Governor John McKeithen as the state corrections director after he retired from military service in 1967.

Wade was born in Minden, the seat of Webster Parish, which had been created in 1871 from Claiborne Parish. He was reared in the Holly Springs community located off U.S. Highway 79 between Minden and Homer. He procured the Bachelor of Science in engineering from Louisiana Tech University in Ruston. He entered the United States Army and served thereafter in World War II, the Korean War, and the Vietnam War. In February 1935, Wade launched what became a 32-year military career when he enlisted as a cadet in the United States Army Air Corps, the forerunner of the Air Force.

On August 1, 1963, Wade was promoted to lieutenant general and assumed command of SAC's Second Air Force with headquarters then at Barksdale Air Force Base in Bossier City, some fifty miles west of his hometown of Homer, Louisiana.

After Wade's military retirement, Governor John J. McKeithen named him in 1967 as the director of the Louisiana Department of Public Safety and Corrections, with authority over both state police and prisons. From 1968 to 1972, he was the adjutant general of the Louisiana National Guard.

== Notable inmate ==
- Billy Sinclair, a prison journalist, former co-editor of The Angolite, and author - originally incarcerated in the Louisiana State Penitentiary for murder.
