= Danny Roy Moore =

American politician

Louisiana State Senator for Claiborne and Bienville parishes
- In office 1964–1968
- Preceded by: James T. McCalman
- Succeeded by: Charles C. Barham

Personal details
- Born: August 9, 1925 Haynesville, Louisiana, U.S.
- Died: c. 2020/2021 (aged 95–96)
- Party: Democratic
- Spouse(s): Patricia Camp (m. 1952; div. 1976) Susan Butler (died 2006)
- Children: 2
- Education: Louisiana Tech University; Louisiana State University
- Occupation: Civil engineer, Land surveyor

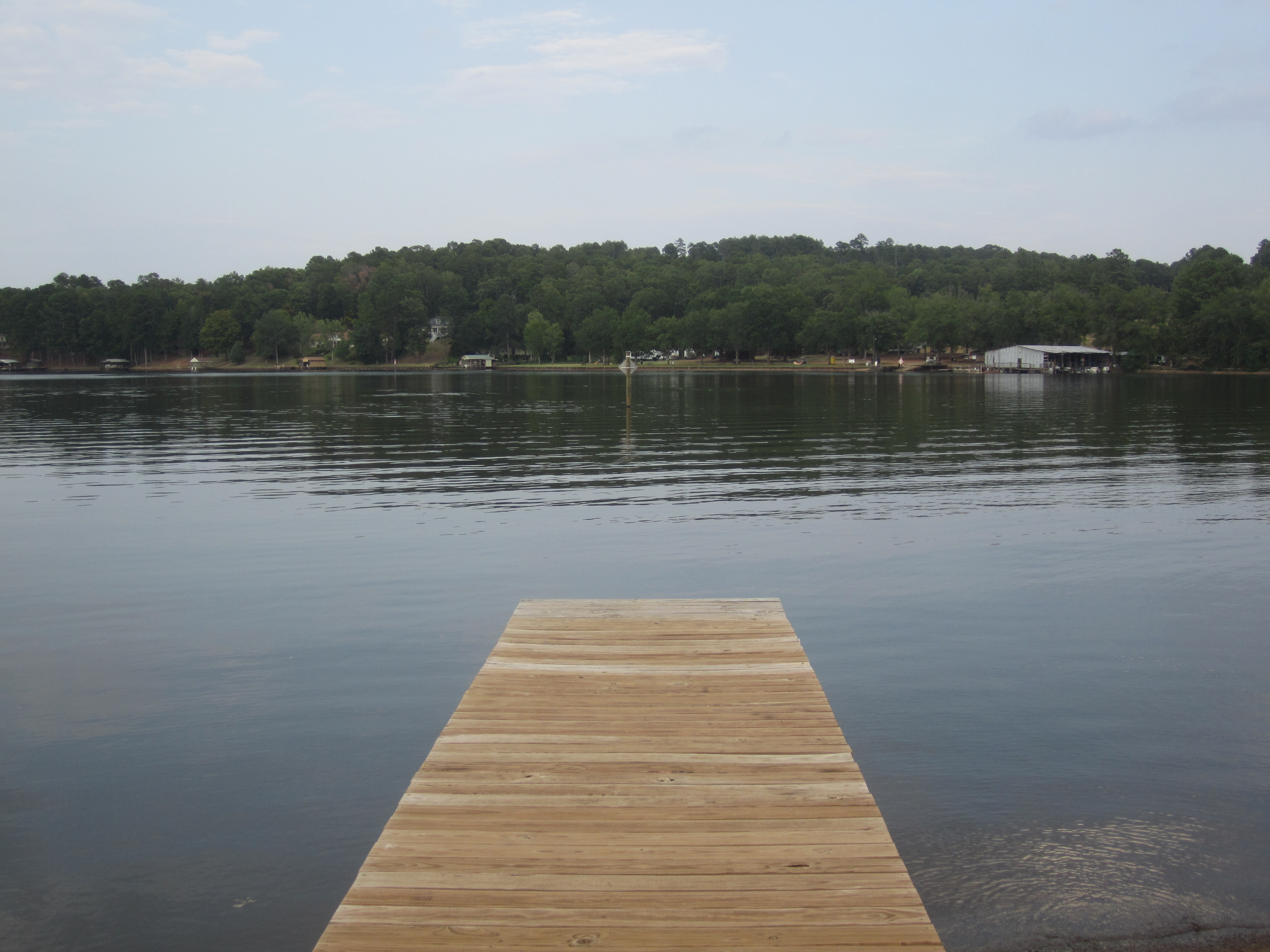
Lake Claiborne, shown here, was a subject of legislative interest to Moore during his service in the state senate.

Danny Roy Moore (August 9, 1925 – c. 2020/2021) was an American politician who was a conservative Democratic member of the Louisiana State Senate for one term, from 1964 until 1968.

Moore was born in Haynesville, Claiborne Parish, Louisiana, the son of Capitola Touchstone Moore and Arthur Roy Moore, and brother of Catherine Moore Walker Hansbrough, George Donald Moore and Mary Celia Moore Sawyer. He had two children Danette Moore and Daniel Judson Moore, DDS.

Moore graduated from Homer High School in 1942. He served in World War II aboard a B-24 bomber making raids over Germany. After the war, he received a degree in civil engineering from Louisiana State University, and worked as land surveyor. He was narrowly elected to the state senate in 1964, and focused his efforts there on the creation of Lake Claiborne.

Moore celebrated his 95th birthday in August 2020. He died sometime between then and April 2021, as noted in his son Daniel Judd Moore's obituary.

Louisiana State Senate
Preceded by James T. McCalman	Louisiana State Senator for Claiborne and Bienville parishes Danny Roy Moore; 1964–1968	Succeeded by Charles C. Barham
