= Shreveport–Bossier City–Minden combined statistical area =

Coordinates: 32°30′N 93°42′W

Shreveport–Bossier City
- Combined Statistical Area
- Shreveport–Bossier City–Minden, LA CSA
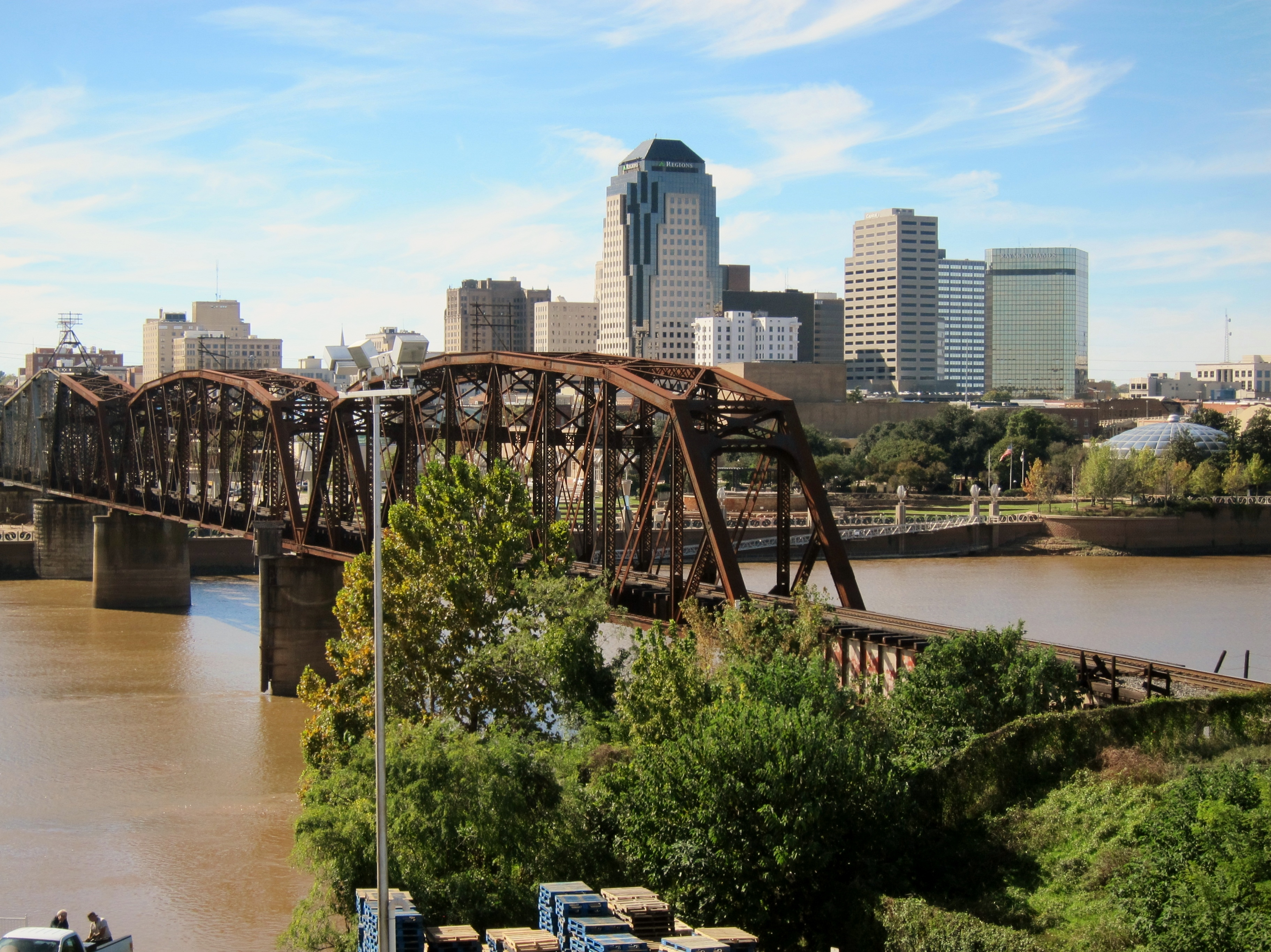
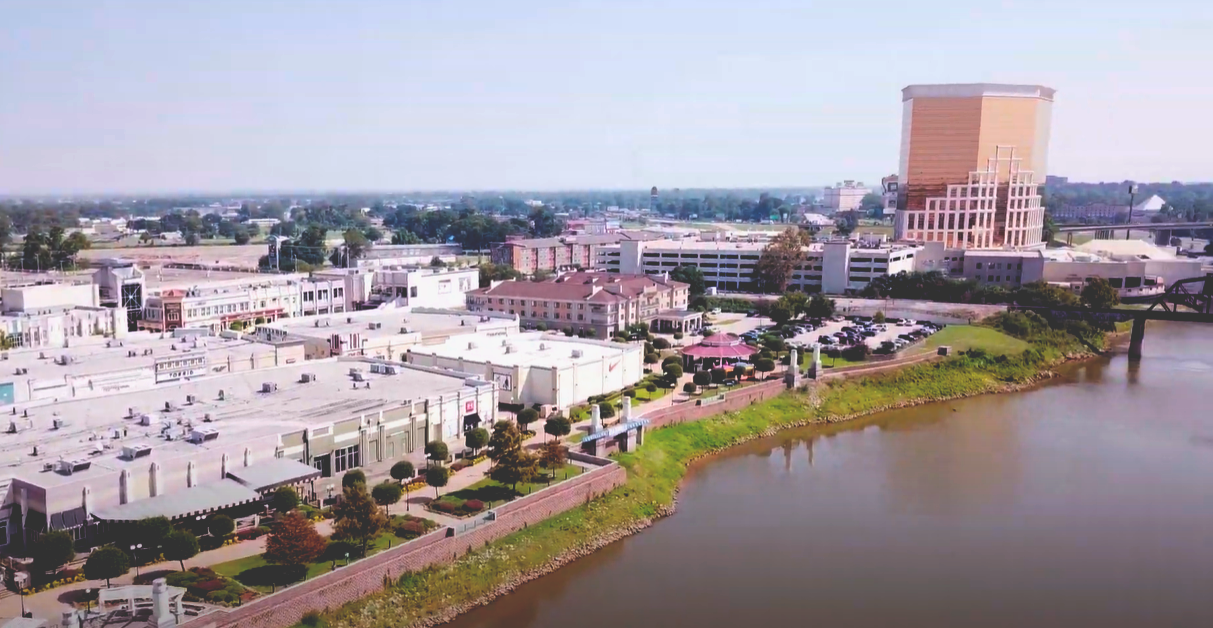
- From top to bottom: Shreveport, Bossier City
Map of Shreveport–Bossier City–Minden, LA CSA
City of Shreveport
Bossier City
Shreveport–Bossier City, LA MSA
Minden, LA µSA
- Country: United States
- State: Louisiana
- Parish: Bossier; Caddo; DeSoto; Webster
- Principal communities: List: Shreveport; Bossier City; Greenwood; Mansfield

Population (2010)
  - Total: 444,000
- Time zone: UTC-6 (CST)
  - Summer (DST): CDT

The Shreveport–Bossier City–Minden combined statistical area is made up of four parishes in northwestern Louisiana. The statistical area consists of the Shreveport–Bossier City metropolitan statistical area and the Minden micropolitan statistical area. As of the 2010 census, the CSA had a population of 439,000 (though a July 1, 2011, estimate placed the population at 444,000). In 2013, OMB changed statistical definitions, subsuming Minden into the Shreveport metro (and therefore voiding the separate Combined Area); in 2018, these changes were reversed.

== Cities and suburbs ==
=== Cities ===
- Bossier City (principal city and suburb)
- Mansfield
- Minden (principal city)
- Shreveport (principal city)
- Springhill

=== Towns ===
- Benton
- Blanchard (suburb)
- Cotton Valley
- Cullen
- Greenwood (suburb)
- Haughton (suburb)
- Keachie
- Logansport
- Oil City
- Plain Dealing
- Sarepta
- Sibley
- Stonewall (suburb)
- Vivian

=== Villages ===
- Belcher
- Dixie Inn
- Doyline
- Dubberly
- Gilliam
- Grand Cane
- Heflin
- Hosston
- Ida
- Longstreet
- Mooringsport
- Rodessa
- Shongaloo
- South Mansfield
- Stanley

=== Census-designated places ===
- Eastwood (suburb)
- Frierson
- Gloster
- Lakeview (suburb)
- Red Chute (suburb)

=== Unincorporated communities ===
Bossier Side

- Arkana
- Atkins
- Elm Grove
- Fillmore
- Princeton
- Rocky Mount
- Taylortown

Caddo Side

- Bethany
- Conn
- Crosskeys
- Dixie
- Forbing
- Keithville (suburb)
- Spring Ridge
- Three States
- Zylks

DeSoto Side

- Kingston
- Pelican

Webster Side

- Midway
- Yellow Pine

== Demographics ==
As of the census of 2010, there were 439,000 people, 189,000 households, and 132,190 families residing within the CSA. The racial makeup of the CSA was 59.48% White, 37.68% African American, 0.42% Native American, 0.74% Asian, 0.04% Pacific Islander, 0.54% from other races, and 1.09% from two or more races. Hispanic or Latino of any race were 1.82% of the population.

The median income for a household in the CSA was $31,833, and the median income for a family was $38,182. Males had a median income of $31,273 versus $21,613 for females. The per capita income for the CSA was $16,192.

== See also ==
- Louisiana census statistical areas
- List of cities, towns, and villages in Louisiana
- List of census-designated places in Louisiana
