= List of municipalities in Louisiana =

Map of the United States with Louisiana highlighted

Louisiana is a state located in the Southern United States. According to the 2020 United States census, Louisiana is the 25th most populous state with 4,657,757 inhabitants and the 33rd largest by land area spanning 43,203.90 square miles (111,897.6 km^{2}) of land. Louisiana is divided into 64 parishes, which are equivalent to counties, and contains 305 municipalities consisting of four consolidated city-parishes, 65 cities, 130 towns, and 106 villages. Louisiana's municipalities cover only 7.8% of the state's land mass but are home to 46.4% of its population.

According to the 2015 Louisiana Laws Revised Statutes, residents of any unincorporated area may propose to incorporate as a municipality if the area meets prescribed minimum population thresholds. Municipal corporations are divided based on population into three classes: cities, towns, and villages. Those having five thousand inhabitants or more are classified as cities; those having less than five thousand but more than one thousand inhabitants are classified as towns; and those having one thousand or fewer inhabitants are classified as villages. The governor may change the classification of the municipality if the board of aldermen requests a change and a census shows that the population has increased or decreased making it eligible for a different classification. Municipalities are granted powers to perform functions required by local governments including the levy and collection of taxes and to assume indebtedness.

The largest municipality by population in Louisiana in 2020 is New Orleans with 383,997 residents, and the smallest is Mound with 12 residents. The largest municipality by land area is New Orleans, which spans 169.49 mi^{2} (439.0 km^{2}), while Napoleonville is the smallest at 0.17 mi^{2} (0.44 km^{2}). The first municipality to incorporate was Natchitoches in 1712 and the newest is St. George in 2019.

== List of municipalities ==
Most populous municipalities in Louisiana

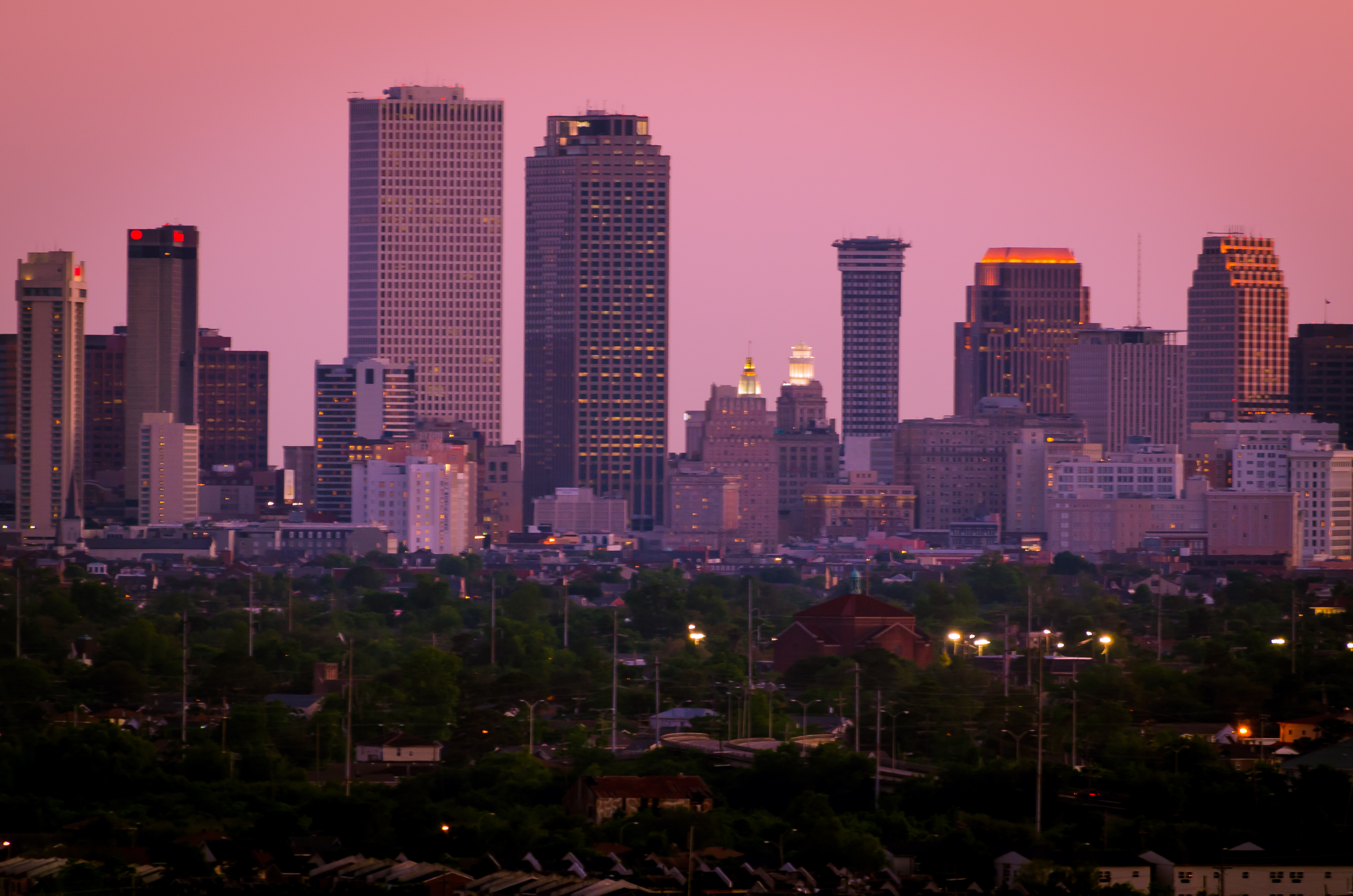
Skyline of New Orleans, the most populous municipality in Louisiana

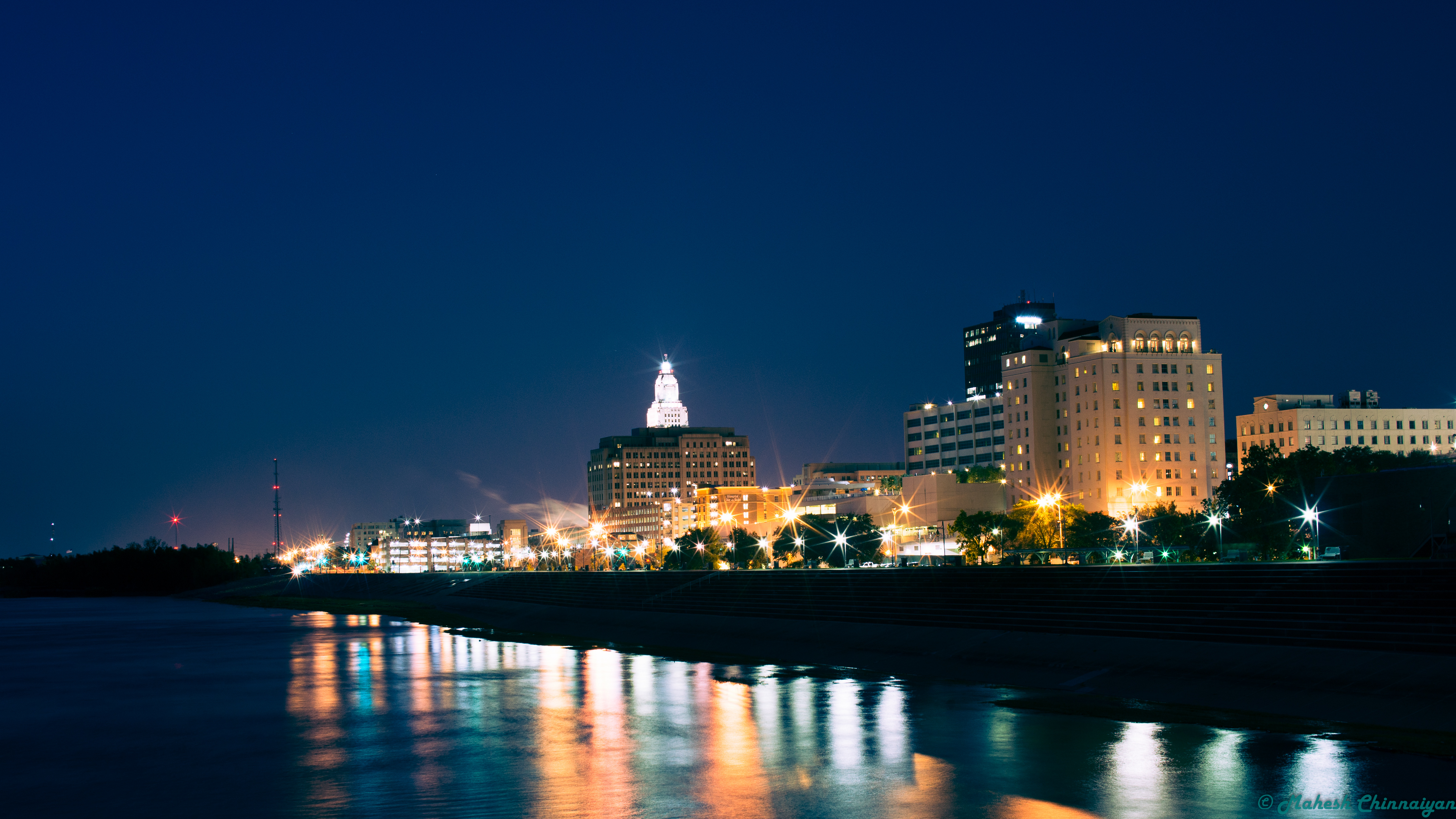
Baton Rouge, capital and second most populous municipality in Louisiana

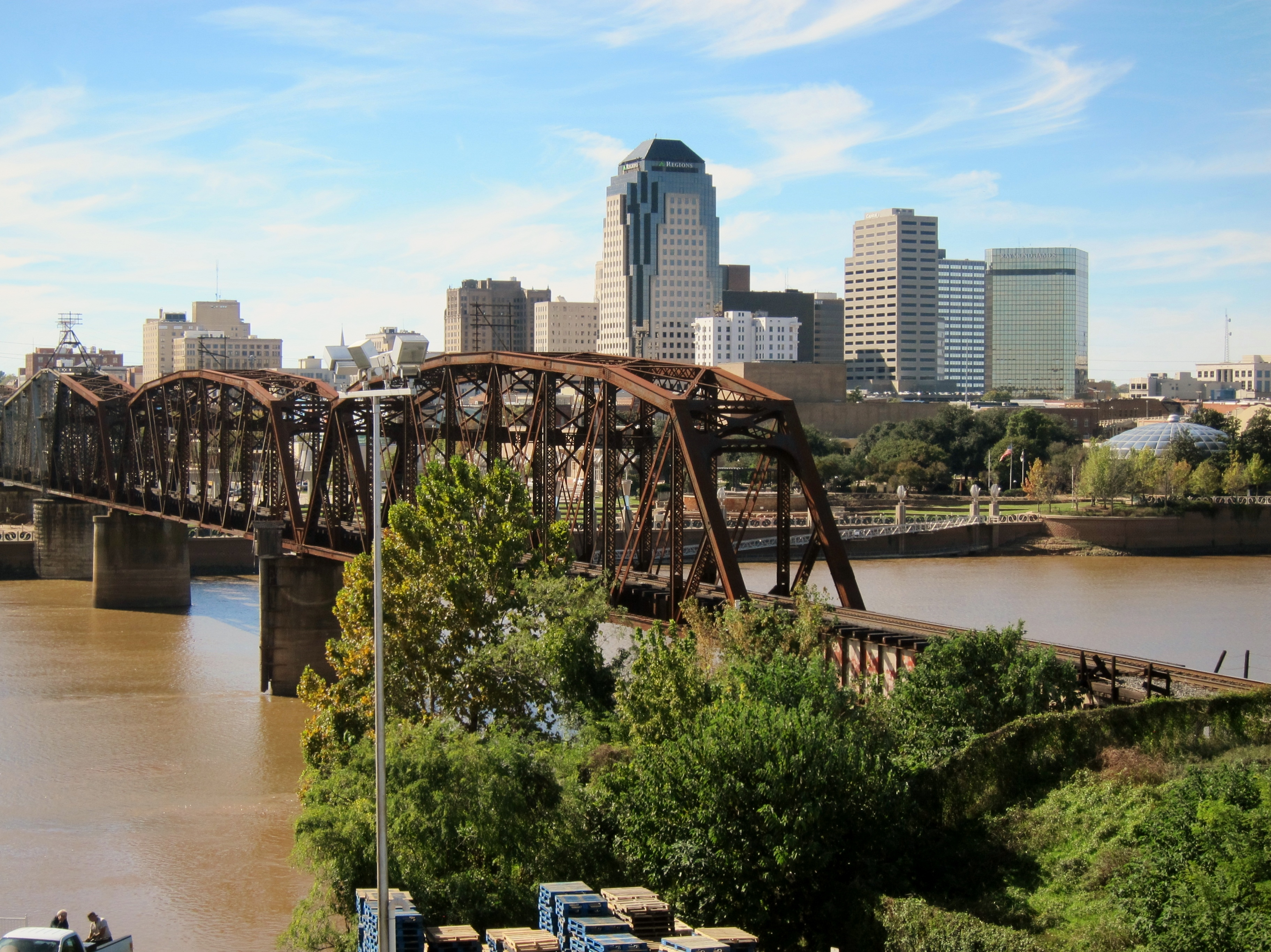
Skyline of Shreveport, third most populous municipality in Louisiana

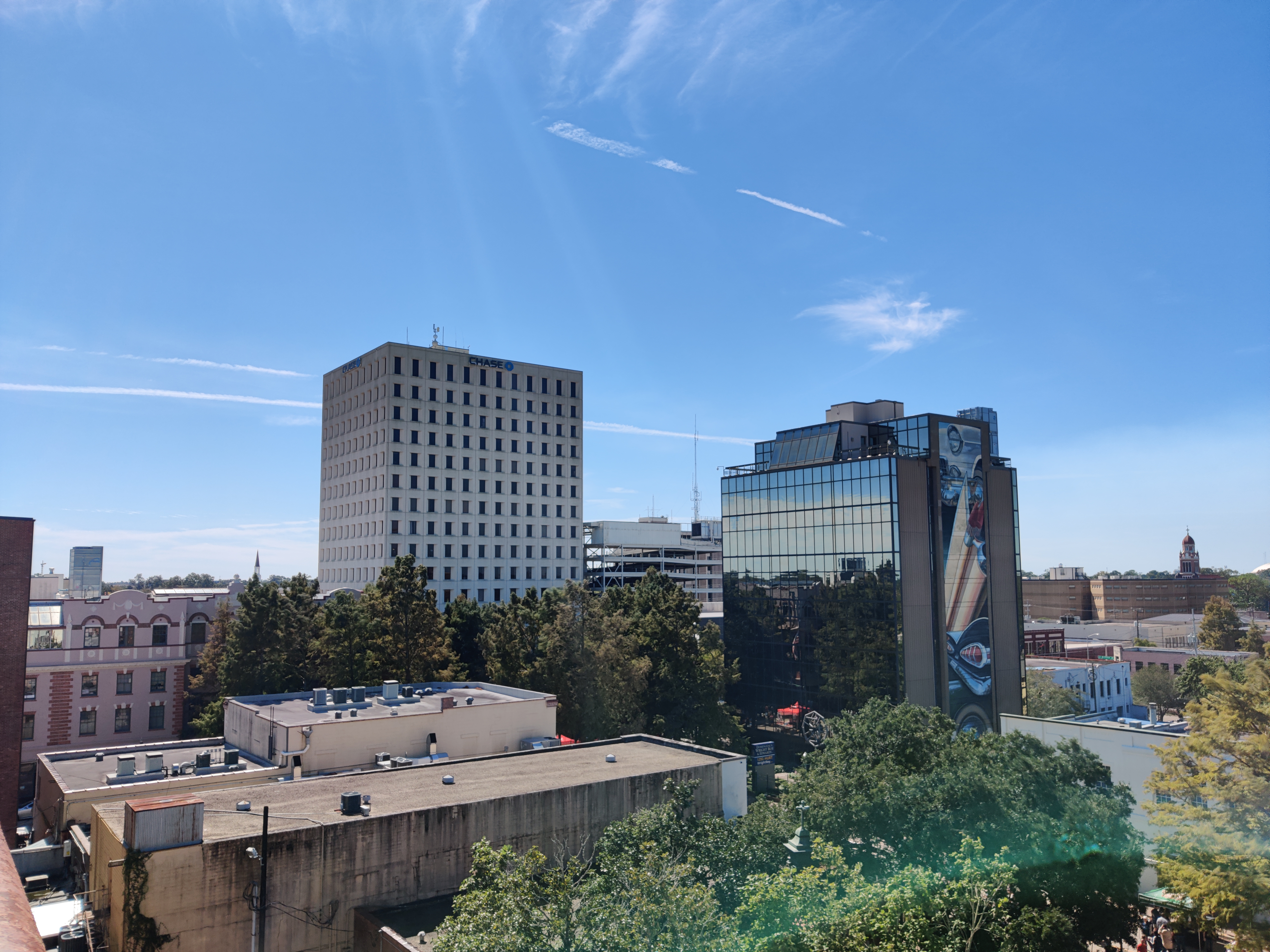
Lafayette, fourth most populous municipality in Louisiana

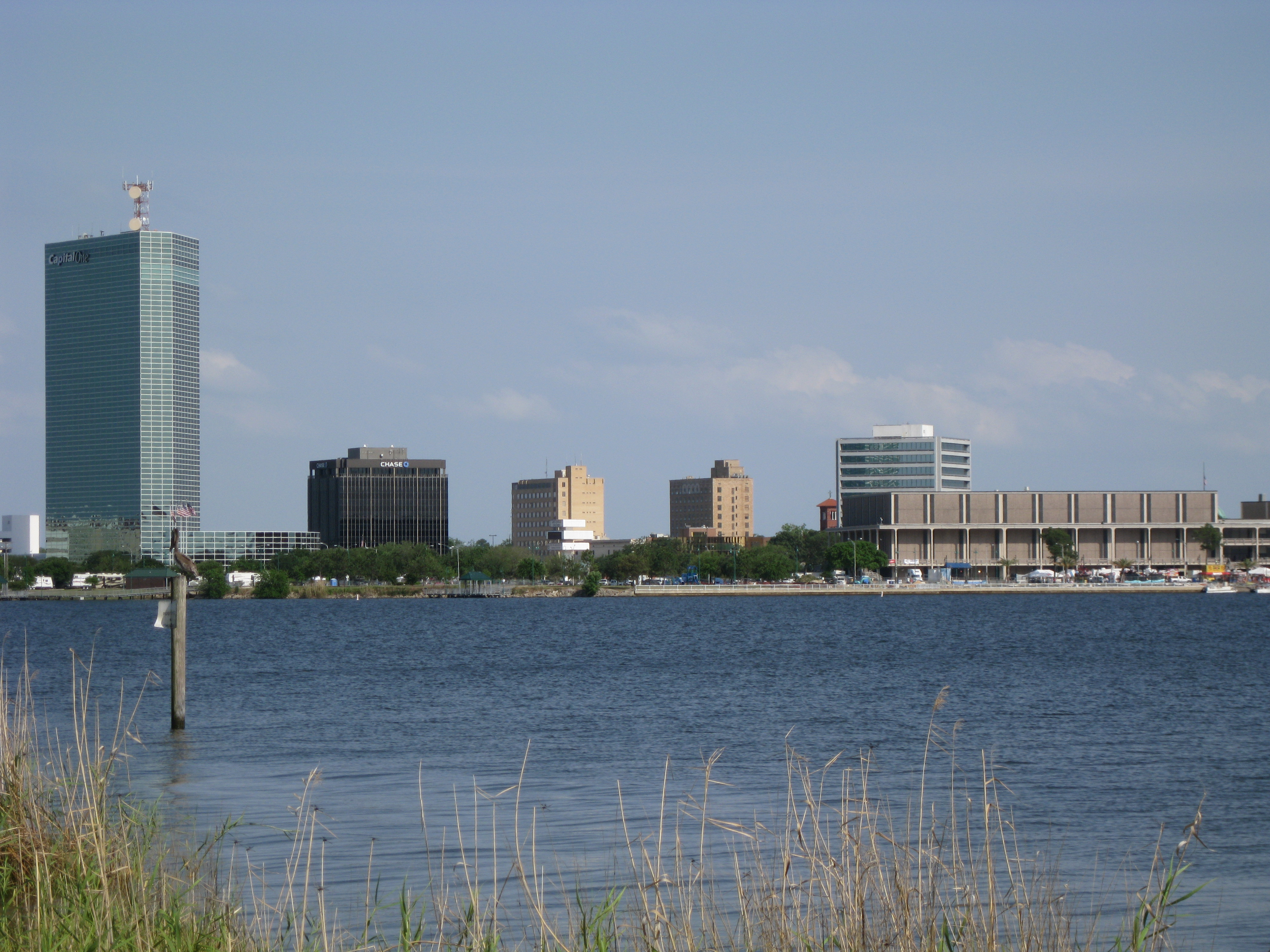
Lake Charles, fifth most populous municipality in Louisiana

† Parish seat

‡ State capital and parish seat

Name	Type	Parish	Population (2020)	Population (2010)	Change	Land area (2020)		Population density	Year of incorporation
Name	Type	Parish	Population (2020)	Population (2010)	Change	sq mi	km^{2}	Population density	Year of incorporation
Abbeville†	City	Vermilion	11,186	12,257	−8.7%	6.05	15.7	1,848.9/sq mi (713.9/km^{2})	1850
Abita Springs	Town	St. Tammany	2,631	2,365	+11.2%	4.59	11.9	573.2/sq mi (221.3/km^{2})	1903
Addis	Town	West Baton Rouge	6,731	3,593	+87.3%	4.20	10.9	1,602.6/sq mi (618.8/km^{2})	1915
Albany	Town	Livingston	1,235	1,088	+13.5%	1.34	3.5	921.6/sq mi (355.8/km^{2})	1953
Alexandria†	City	Rapides	46,180	47,723	−3.2%	28.49	73.8	1,620.9/sq mi (625.8/km^{2})	1818
Amite City†	Town	Tangipahoa	4,005	4,141	−3.3%	3.88	10.0	1,032.2/sq mi (398.5/km^{2})	1861
Anacoco	Village	Vernon	851	869	−2.1%	3.08	8.0	276.3/sq mi (106.7/km^{2})	1979
Angie	Village	Washington	258	251	+2.8%	1.53	4.0	168.6/sq mi (65.1/km^{2})	1908
Arcadia†	Town	Bienville	2,746	2,919	−5.9%	3.65	9.5	752.3/sq mi (290.5/km^{2})	1855
Arnaudville	Town	St. Landry, St. Martin	1,009	1,057	−4.5%	0.69	1.8	1,462.3/sq mi (564.6/km^{2})	1870
Ashland	Village	Natchitoches	194	269	−27.9%	26.99	69.9	7.2/sq mi (2.8/km^{2})	1963
Athens	Village	Claiborne	237	249	−4.8%	3.50	9.1	67.7/sq mi (26.1/km^{2})	1902
Atlanta	Village	Winn	149	163	−8.6%	1.08	2.8	138.0/sq mi (53.3/km^{2})	1907
Baker	City	East Baton Rouge	12,455	13,895	−10.4%	8.40	21.8	1,482.7/sq mi (572.5/km^{2})	1944
Baldwin	Town	St. Mary	1,762	2,436	−27.7%	3.22	8.3	547.2/sq mi (211.3/km^{2})	1913
Ball	Town	Rapides	3,961	4,000	−1.0%	7.95	20.6	498.2/sq mi (192.4/km^{2})	1972
Basile	Town	Acadia, Evangeline	1,214	1,821	−33.3%	1.16	3.0	1,046.6/sq mi (404.1/km^{2})	1911
Baskin	Village	Franklin	210	254	−17.3%	1.33	3.4	157.9/sq mi (61.0/km^{2})	1917
Bastrop†	City	Morehouse	9,691	11,365	−14.7%	8.56	22.2	1,132.1/sq mi (437.1/km^{2})	1852
Baton Rouge‡ (Note: Baton Rouge consolidated with East Baton Rouge Parish in 1947, which combined the City of Baton Rouge government with the unincorporated areas of the parish. However, the Census only counts the population within Baton Rouge's city limits. This does not include the unincorporated areas. Baton Rouge would be the largest municipality in the state with a population of 384,452 if the 2010 Census included the consolidated areas in Baton Rouge's population.)	Consolidated; Government	East Baton Rouge	227,470	229,493	−0.88%	86.32	223.6	2,635.2/sq mi (1,017.5/km^{2})	1817
Belcher	Village	Caddo	248	263	−5.7%	1.57	4.1	158.0/sq mi (61.0/km^{2})	1966
Benton†	Town	Bossier	2,048	1,948	+5.1%	2.16	5.6	948.1/sq mi (366.1/km^{2})	1876
Bernice	Town	Union	1,356	1,689	−19.7%	3.23	8.4	419.8/sq mi (162.1/km^{2})	1899
Berwick	Town	St. Mary	4,771	4,946	−3.5%	5.90	15.3	808.6/sq mi (312.2/km^{2})	1907
Bienville	Village	Bienville	191	218	−12.4%	11.04	28.6	17.3/sq mi (6.7/km^{2})	1904
Blanchard	Town	Caddo	3,538	2,899	+22.0%	3.49	9.0	1,013.8/sq mi (391.4/km^{2})	1961
Bogalusa	City	Washington	10,659	12,232	−12.9%	9.51	24.6	1,120.8/sq mi (432.8/km^{2})	1914
Bonita	Village	Morehouse	170	284	−40.1%	1.35	3.5	125.9/sq mi (48.6/km^{2})	1903
Bossier City	City	Bossier	62,701	61,315	+2.3%	43.80	113.4	1,431.5/sq mi (552.7/km^{2})	1951
Boyce	Town	Rapides	888	1,004	−11.6%	0.46	1.2	1,930.4/sq mi (745.3/km^{2})	1887
Breaux Bridge	City	St. Martin	7,513	8,139	−7.7%	7.72	20.0	973.2/sq mi (375.7/km^{2})	1859
Broussard	City	Lafayette, St. Martin	13,417	8,197	+63.7%	17.89	46.3	750.0/sq mi (289.6/km^{2})	1905
Brusly	Town	West Baton Rouge	2,578	2,589	−0.4%	2.21	5.7	1,166.5/sq mi (450.4/km^{2})	1901
Bryceland	Village	Bienville	87	108	−19.4%	2.33	6.0	37.3/sq mi (14.4/km^{2})	1911
Bunkie	City	Avoyelles	3,346	4,171	−19.8%	3.02	7.8	1,107.9/sq mi (427.8/km^{2})	1885
Calvin	Village	Winn	242	238	+1.7%	2.29	5.9	105.7/sq mi (40.8/km^{2})	1951
Campti	Town	Natchitoches	887	1,056	−16.0%	1.04	2.7	852.9/sq mi (329.3/km^{2})	1857
Cankton	Village	St. Landry	583	484	+20.5%	2.04	5.3	285.8/sq mi (110.3/km^{2})	1960
Carencro	City	Lafayette	9,272	7,526	+23.2%	7.86	20.4	1,179.6/sq mi (455.5/km^{2})	1905
Castor	Village	Bienville	230	258	−10.9%	1.19	3.1	193.3/sq mi (74.6/km^{2})	1920
Central	City	East Baton Rouge	29,565	26,864	+10.1%	62.26	161.3	474.9/sq mi (183.3/km^{2})	2005
Chataignier	Village	Evangeline	259	364	−28.8%	0.63	1.6	411.1/sq mi (158.7/km^{2})	1972
Chatham	Town	Jackson	491	557	−11.8%	0.99	2.6	496.0/sq mi (191.5/km^{2})	1909
Cheneyville	Town	Rapides	468	625	−25.1%	1.02	2.6	458.8/sq mi (177.2/km^{2})	1836
Choudrant	Village	Lincoln	989	845	+17.0%	4.23	11.0	233.8/sq mi (90.3/km^{2})	1915
Church Point	Town	Acadia	4,179	4,560	−8.4%	2.89	7.5	1,446.0/sq mi (558.3/km^{2})	1898
Clarence	Village	Natchitoches	326	499	−34.7%	1.57	4.1	207.6/sq mi (80.2/km^{2})	1951
Clarks	Village	Caldwell	1,052	1,017	+3.4%	0.96	2.5	1,095.8/sq mi (423.1/km^{2})	1953
Clayton	Town	Concordia	584	711	−17.9%	1.58	4.1	369.6/sq mi (142.7/km^{2})	1946
Clinton†	Town	East Feliciana	1,340	1,653	−18.9%	2.74	7.1	489.1/sq mi (188.8/km^{2})	1852
Colfax†	Town	Grant	1,428	1,558	−8.3%	1.49	3.9	958.4/sq mi (370.0/km^{2})	1878
Collinston	Village	Morehouse	274	287	−4.5%	1.13	2.9	242.5/sq mi (93.6/km^{2})	1904
Columbia†	Town	Caldwell	277	390	−29.0%	0.76	2.0	364.5/sq mi (140.7/km^{2})	1847
Converse	Village	Sabine	379	440	−13.9%	2.18	5.6	173.9/sq mi (67.1/km^{2})	1921
Cottonport	Town	Avoyelles	2,023	2,006	+0.8%	2.01	5.2	1,006.5/sq mi (388.6/km^{2})	1888
Cotton Valley	Town	Webster	787	1,009	−22.0%	2.63	6.8	299.2/sq mi (115.5/km^{2})	1912
Coushatta†	Town	Red River	1,752	1,964	−10.8%	3.34	8.7	524.6/sq mi (202.5/km^{2})	1872
Covington†	City	St. Tammany	11,564	8,765	+31.9%	8.02	20.8	1,441.9/sq mi (556.7/km^{2})	1816
Creola	Village	Grant	242	213	+13.6%	0.41	1.1	590.2/sq mi (227.9/km^{2})	2000
Crowley†	City	Acadia	11,710	13,265	−11.7%	5.85	15.2	2,001.7/sq mi (772.9/km^{2})	1887
Cullen	Town	Webster	716	1,163	−38.4%	1.15	3.0	622.6/sq mi (240.4/km^{2})	1955
Delcambre	Town	Iberia, Vermilion	1,793	1,866	−3.9%	1.17	3.0	1,532.5/sq mi (591.7/km^{2})	1907
Delhi	Town	Richland	2,622	2,919	−10.2%	2.87	7.4	913.6/sq mi (352.7/km^{2})	1900
Delta	Village	Madison	232	284	−18.3%	4.44	11.5	52.3/sq mi (20.2/km^{2})	1969
Denham Springs	City	Livingston	9,286	10,215	−9.1%	7.29	18.9	1,273.8/sq mi (491.8/km^{2})	1903
DeQuincy	City	Calcasieu	3,144	3,235	−2.8%	3.20	8.3	982.5/sq mi (379.3/km^{2})	1947
DeRidder†	City	Beauregard, Vernon	9,852	10,578	−6.9%	9.29	24.1	1,060.5/sq mi (409.5/km^{2})	1903
Dixie Inn	Village	Webster	293	273	+7.3%	0.48	1.2	610.4/sq mi (235.7/km^{2})	1976
Dodson	Village	Winn	294	337	−12.8%	2.25	5.8	130.7/sq mi (50.5/km^{2})	1901
Donaldsonville†	City	Ascension	6,695	7,436	−10.0%	3.78	9.8	1,771.2/sq mi (683.9/km^{2})	1813
Downsville	Village	Lincoln, Union	120	141	−14.9%	0.74	1.9	162.2/sq mi (62.6/km^{2})	1972
Doyline	Village	Webster	674	818	−17.6%	3.33	8.6	202.4/sq mi (78.1/km^{2})	1948
Dry Prong	Village	Grant	455	436	+4.4%	1.39	3.6	327.3/sq mi (126.4/km^{2})	1947
Dubach	Town	Lincoln	908	961	−5.5%	1.82	4.7	498.9/sq mi (192.6/km^{2})	1901
Dubberly	Village	Webster	250	273	−8.4%	3.94	10.2	63.5/sq mi (24.5/km^{2})	1959
Duson	Town	Acadia, Lafayette	1,326	1,716	−22.7%	3.01	7.8	440.5/sq mi (170.1/km^{2})	1909
East Hodge	Village	Jackson	204	289	−29.4%	0.23	0.60	887.0/sq mi (342.5/km^{2})	1968
Edgefield	Village	Red River	204	218	−6.4%	0.25	0.65	816.0/sq mi (315.1/km^{2})	1966
Elizabeth	Village	Allen	417	532	−21.6%	1.65	4.3	252.7/sq mi (97.6/km^{2})	1964
Elton	Town	Jefferson Davis	992	1,128	−12.1%	1.66	4.3	597.6/sq mi (230.7/km^{2})	1911
Epps	Village	West Carroll	358	854	−58.1%	0.97	2.5	369.1/sq mi (142.5/km^{2})	1939
Erath	Town	Vermilion	2,028	2,114	−4.1%	1.76	4.6	1,152.3/sq mi (444.9/km^{2})	1898
Eros	Town	Jackson	130	155	−16.1%	1.00	2.6	130.0/sq mi (50.2/km^{2})	1905
Estherwood	Village	Acadia	694	889	−21.9%	1.86	4.8	373.1/sq mi (144.1/km^{2})	1901
Eunice	City	Acadia, St. Landry	9,422	10,398	−9.4%	5.14	13.3	1,833.1/sq mi (707.8/km^{2})	1894
Evergreen	Town	Avoyelles	215	310	−30.6%	1.02	2.6	210.8/sq mi (81.4/km^{2})	1871
Farmerville†	Town	Union	3,366	3,860	−12.8%	5.78	15.0	582.4/sq mi (224.8/km^{2})	1842
Fenton	Village	Jefferson Davis	226	379	−40.4%	0.49	1.3	461.2/sq mi (178.1/km^{2})	1951
Ferriday	Town	Concordia	3,189	3,511	−9.2%	1.63	4.2	1,956.4/sq mi (755.4/km^{2})	1906
Fisher	Village	Sabine	197	230	−14.3%	0.62	1.6	317.7/sq mi (122.7/km^{2})	1971
Florien	Village	Sabine	553	633	−12.6%	2.23	5.8	248.0/sq mi (95.7/km^{2})	1959
Folsom	Village	St. Tammany	769	716	+7.4%	1.91	4.9	402.6/sq mi (155.5/km^{2})	1915
Fordoche	Town	Pointe Coupee	910	928	−1.9%	2.43	6.3	374.5/sq mi (144.6/km^{2})	1961
Forest	Village	West Carroll	304	355	−14.4%	1.67	4.3	182.0/sq mi (70.3/km^{2})	1967
Forest Hill	Village	Rapides	605	818	−26.0%	3.76	9.7	160.9/sq mi (62.1/km^{2})	1921
Franklin†	City	St. Mary	6,728	7,660	−12.2%	9.92	25.7	678.2/sq mi (261.9/km^{2})	1820
Franklinton†	Town	Washington	3,662	3,857	−5.1%	4.37	11.3	838.0/sq mi (323.5/km^{2})	1861
French Settlement	Village	Livingston	1,073	1,116	−3.9%	2.73	7.1	393.0/sq mi (151.8/km^{2})	1965
Georgetown	Town	Grant	277	327	−15.3%	1.30	3.4	213.1/sq mi (82.3/km^{2})	1949
Gibsland	Town	Bienville	773	979	−21.0%	2.63	6.8	293.9/sq mi (113.5/km^{2})	1903
Gilbert	Village	Franklin	449	521	−13.8%	1.05	2.7	427.6/sq mi (165.1/km^{2})	1912
Gilliam	Village	Caddo	123	164	−25.0%	2.37	6.1	51.9/sq mi (20.0/km^{2})	1968
Glenmora	Town	Rapides	1,087	1,342	−19.0%	1.73	4.5	628.3/sq mi (242.6/km^{2})	1914
Golden Meadow	Town	Lafourche	1,761	2,101	−16.2%	2.45	6.3	718.8/sq mi (277.5/km^{2})	1950
Goldonna	Village	Natchitoches	428	430	−0.5%	13.07	33.9	32.7/sq mi (12.6/km^{2})	1911
Gonzales	City	Ascension	12,231	9,781	+25.0%	9.14	23.7	1,338.2/sq mi (516.7/km^{2})	1922
Grambling	City	Lincoln	5,239	4,949	+5.9%	5.90	15.3	888.0/sq mi (342.8/km^{2})	1953
Gramercy	Town	St. James	2,932	3,613	−18.8%	2.01	5.2	1,458.7/sq mi (563.2/km^{2})	1947
Grand Cane	Village	De Soto	217	242	−10.3%	1.13	2.9	192.0/sq mi (74.1/km^{2})	1899
Grand Coteau	Town	St. Landry	776	947	−18.1%	2.42	6.3	320.7/sq mi (123.8/km^{2})	1855
Grand Isle	Town	Jefferson	1,005	1,296	−22.5%	6.40	16.6	157.0/sq mi (60.6/km^{2})	1959
Grayson	Village	Caldwell	449	532	−15.6%	1.27	3.3	353.5/sq mi (136.5/km^{2})	1916
Greensburg†	Town	St. Helena	629	718	−12.4%	2.52	6.5	249.6/sq mi (96.4/km^{2})	1869
Greenwood	Town	Caddo	3,166	3,219	−1.6%	8.99	23.3	352.2/sq mi (136.0/km^{2})	1970
Gretna†	City	Jefferson	17,814	17,736	+0.4%	4.04	10.5	4,409.4/sq mi (1,702.5/km^{2})	1913
Grosse Tete	Village	Iberville	548	647	−15.3%	1.47	3.8	372.8/sq mi (143.9/km^{2})	1952
Gueydan	Town	Vermilion	1,165	1,398	−16.7%	0.91	2.4	1,280.2/sq mi (494.3/km^{2})	1899
Hall Summit	Village	Red River	268	300	−10.7%	1.67	4.3	160.5/sq mi (62.0/km^{2})	1961
Hammond	City	Tangipahoa	19,584	20,019	−2.2%	14.04	36.4	1,394.9/sq mi (538.6/km^{2})	1889
Harahan	City	Jefferson	9,116	9,277	−1.7%	2.02	5.2	4,512.9/sq mi (1,742.4/km^{2})	1920
Harrisonburg†	Village	Catahoula	277	348	−20.4%	0.97	2.5	285.6/sq mi (110.3/km^{2})	1836
Haughton	Town	Bossier	4,539	3,454	+31.4%	5.71	14.8	794.9/sq mi (306.9/km^{2})	1921
Haynesville	Town	Claiborne	2,039	2,327	−12.4%	4.83	12.5	422.2/sq mi (163.0/km^{2})	1901
Heflin	Village	Webster	213	244	−12.7%	1.91	4.9	111.5/sq mi (43.1/km^{2})	1952
Henderson	Town	St. Martin	1,617	1,674	−3.4%	2.99	7.7	540.8/sq mi (208.8/km^{2})	1971
Hessmer	Village	Avoyelles	772	802	−3.7%	0.83	2.1	930.1/sq mi (359.1/km^{2})	1955
Hodge	Village	Jackson	382	470	−18.7%	0.97	2.5	393.8/sq mi (152.1/km^{2})	1928
Homer†	Town	Claiborne	2,747	3,237	−15.1%	4.65	12.0	590.8/sq mi (228.1/km^{2})	1850
Hornbeck	Town	Vernon	430	480	−10.4%	1.15	3.0	373.9/sq mi (144.4/km^{2})	1902
Hosston	Village	Caddo	244	318	−23.3%	2.66	6.9	91.7/sq mi (35.4/km^{2})	1967
Houma† (Note: Houma city is the parish seat of Terrebonne Parish, but is not a governmental unit having consolidated its functions with the parish. Since Houma city retains its city status under state law, the Census Bureau includes it as an incorporated place. Houma would be the largest municipality by land area with an area of 1,231.81 sq mi (and a population of 111,860) if the Census included the consolidated area within Houma's borders.)	Consolidated; Government	Terrebonne	33,406	33,727	−1.0%	14.47	37.5	2,308.6/sq mi (891.4/km^{2})	1834
Ida	Village	Caddo	217	221	−1.8%	1.28	3.3	169.5/sq mi (65.5/km^{2})	1967
Independence	Town	Tangipahoa	1,635	1,665	−1.8%	2.41	6.2	678.4/sq mi (261.9/km^{2})	1903
Iota	Town	Acadia	1,304	1,500	−13.1%	1.27	3.3	1,026.8/sq mi (396.4/km^{2})	1902
Iowa	Town	Calcasieu	3,436	2,996	+14.7%	3.17	8.2	1,083.9/sq mi (418.5/km^{2})	1952
Jackson	Town	East Feliciana	3,990	3,842	+3.9%	4.46	11.6	894.6/sq mi (345.4/km^{2})	1832
Jamestown	Town	Bienville	100	139	−28.1%	1.75	4.5	57.1/sq mi (22.1/km^{2})	1967
Jeanerette	City	Iberia	4,813	5,530	−13.0%	2.31	6.0	2,083.5/sq mi (804.5/km^{2})	1878
Jean Lafitte	Town	Jefferson	1,809	1,903	−4.9%	5.85	15.2	309.2/sq mi (119.4/km^{2})	1974
Jena†	Town	La Salle	4,155	3,398	+22.3%	5.50	14.2	755.5/sq mi (291.7/km^{2})	1909
Jennings†	City	Jefferson Davis	9,837	10,383	−5.3%	10.41	27.0	945.0/sq mi (364.8/km^{2})	1888
Jonesboro†	Town	Jackson	4,106	4,704	−12.7%	4.85	12.6	846.6/sq mi (326.9/km^{2})	1901
Jonesville	Town	Catahoula	1,728	2,265	−23.7%	1.92	5.0	900.0/sq mi (347.5/km^{2})	1890
Junction City	Village	Claiborne, Union	437	582	−24.9%	1.23	3.2	355.3/sq mi (137.2/km^{2})	1907
Kaplan	City	Vermilion	4,352	4,600	−5.4%	2.33	6.0	1,867.8/sq mi (721.2/km^{2})	1903
Keachi	Town	De Soto	243	295	−17.6%	5.03	13.0	48.3/sq mi (18.7/km^{2})	1858
Kenner	City	Jefferson	66,448	66,702	−0.4%	14.88	38.5	4,465.6/sq mi (1,724.2/km^{2})	1867
Kentwood	Town	Tangipahoa	2,145	2,198	−2.4%	7.11	18.4	301.7/sq mi (116.5/km^{2})	1893
Kilbourne	Village	West Carroll	351	416	−15.6%	1.39	3.6	252.5/sq mi (97.5/km^{2})	1954
Killian	Town	Livingston	1,177	1,206	−2.4%	10.88	28.2	108.2/sq mi (41.8/km^{2})	1968
Kinder	Town	Allen	2,170	2,477	−12.4%	5.53	14.3	392.4/sq mi (151.5/km^{2})	1903
Krotz Springs	Town	St. Landry	904	1,198	−24.5%	1.73	4.5	522.5/sq mi (201.8/km^{2})	1917
Lafayette† (Note: Lafayette was originally known as Vermilionville, which was incorporated in 1826. Its name was changed to Lafayette in 1884. Lafayette city government has been consolidated with Lafayette Parish. Public works and other services, such as land use and plat review, are operated by Lafayette Consolidated Government to serve the City of Lafayette and unincorporated areas of Lafayette Parish. However, the Census only counts the population within city limits. This does not include the unincorporated areas. The population including the consolidated areas is 187,713 and the land area is 222.08 sq mi.)	Consolidated; Government	Lafayette	121,374	120,623	+0.6%	55.82	144.6	2,174.4/sq mi (839.5/km^{2})	1836
Lake Arthur	Town	Jefferson Davis	2,595	2,738	−5.2%	1.85	4.8	1,402.7/sq mi (541.6/km^{2})	1904
Lake Charles†	City	Calcasieu	84,872	71,993	+17.9%	45.65	118.2	1,859.2/sq mi (717.8/km^{2})	1867
Lake Providence†	Town	East Carroll	3,587	3,991	−10.1%	3.60	9.3	996.4/sq mi (384.7/km^{2})	1848
Lecompte	Town	Rapides	845	1,227	−31.1%	1.06	2.7	797.2/sq mi (307.8/km^{2})	1904
Leesville†	City	Vernon	5,649	6,612	−14.6%	7.65	19.8	738.4/sq mi (285.1/km^{2})	1900
Leonville	Town	St. Landry	868	1,084	−19.9%	2.73	7.1	317.9/sq mi (122.8/km^{2})	1911
Lillie	Village	Union	111	118	−5.9%	1.93	5.0	57.5/sq mi (22.2/km^{2})	1966
Lisbon	Village	Claiborne	173	185	−6.5%	13.12	34.0	13.2/sq mi (5.1/km^{2})	1958
Livingston†	Town	Livingston	1,877	1,769	+6.1%	3.22	8.3	582.9/sq mi (225.1/km^{2})	1955
Livonia	Town	Pointe Coupee	1,212	1,442	−16.0%	1.89	4.9	641.3/sq mi (247.6/km^{2})	1959
Lockport	Town	Lafourche	2,490	2,578	−3.4%	1.13	2.9	2,203.5/sq mi (850.8/km^{2})	1899
Logansport	Town	De Soto	1,340	1,555	−13.8%	3.40	8.8	394.1/sq mi (152.2/km^{2})	1925
Longstreet	Village	De Soto	115	157	−26.8%	2.05	5.3	56.1/sq mi (21.7/km^{2})	1919
Loreauville	Village	Iberia	658	887	−25.8%	0.45	1.2	1,462.2/sq mi (564.6/km^{2})	1909
Lucky	Village	Bienville	251	272	−7.7%	8.17	21.2	30.7/sq mi (11.9/km^{2})	1974
Lutcher	Town	St. James	3,133	3,559	−12.0%	3.37	8.7	929.7/sq mi (358.9/km^{2})	1912
McNary	Village	Rapides	201	211	−4.7%	1.84	4.8	109.2/sq mi (42.2/km^{2})	1913
Madisonville	Town	St. Tammany	850	748	+13.6%	2.53	6.6	336.0/sq mi (129.7/km^{2})	1817
Mamou	Town	Evangeline	2,936	3,242	−9.4%	1.41	3.7	2,082.3/sq mi (804.0/km^{2})	1911
Mandeville	City	St. Tammany	13,192	11,560	+14.1%	7.12	18.4	1,852.8/sq mi (715.4/km^{2})	1840
Mangham	Village	Richland	624	672	−7.1%	1.11	2.9	562.2/sq mi (217.1/km^{2})	1907
Mansfield†	City	De Soto	4,714	5,001	−5.7%	3.65	9.5	1,291.5/sq mi (498.7/km^{2})	1847
Mansura	Town	Avoyelles	1,320	1,419	−7.0%	2.85	7.4	463.2/sq mi (178.8/km^{2})	1860
Many†	Town	Sabine	2,571	2,853	−9.9%	3.41	8.8	754.0/sq mi (291.1/km^{2})	1843
Maringouin	Town	Iberville	891	1,098	−18.9%	0.74	1.9	1,204.1/sq mi (464.9/km^{2})	1907
Marion	Town	Union	623	765	−18.6%	3.21	8.3	194.1/sq mi (74.9/km^{2})	1909
Marksville†	City	Avoyelles	5,065	5,702	−11.2%	4.81	12.5	1,053.0/sq mi (406.6/km^{2})	1843
Martin	Village	Red River	524	594	−11.8%	11.55	29.9	45.4/sq mi (17.5/km^{2})	1971
Maurice	Village	Vermilion	2,118	964	+119.7%	2.78	7.2	761.9/sq mi (294.2/km^{2})	1911
Melville	Town	St. Landry	759	1,041	−27.1%	1.26	3.3	602.4/sq mi (232.6/km^{2})	1899
Mermentau	Village	Acadia	516	661	−21.9%	2.13	5.5	242.3/sq mi (93.5/km^{2})	1899
Mer Rouge	Village	Morehouse	491	628	−21.8%	1.17	3.0	419.7/sq mi (162.0/km^{2})	1898
Merryville	Town	Beauregard	967	1,103	−12.3%	9.79	25.4	98.8/sq mi (38.1/km^{2})	1912
Minden†	City	Webster	11,928	13,082	−8.8%	15.04	39.0	793.1/sq mi (306.2/km^{2})	1854
Monroe†	City	Ouachita	47,702	48,815	−2.3%	29.66	76.8	1,608.3/sq mi (621.0/km^{2})	1820
Montgomery	Town	Grant	622	730	−14.8%	2.07	5.4	300.5/sq mi (116.0/km^{2})	1859
Montpelier	Village	St. Helena	196	266	−26.3%	1.87	4.8	104.8/sq mi (40.5/km^{2})	1957
Mooringsport	Town	Caddo	748	793	−5.7%	1.29	3.3	579.8/sq mi (223.9/km^{2})	1910
Moreauville	Village	Avoyelles	984	929	+5.9%	3.03	7.8	324.8/sq mi (125.4/km^{2})	1904
Morgan City	City	St. Martin, St. Mary	11,472	12,404	−7.5%	5.98	15.5	1,918.4/sq mi (740.7/km^{2})	1860
Morganza	Village	Pointe Coupee	525	610	−13.9%	1.21	3.1	433.9/sq mi (167.5/km^{2})	1908
Morse	Village	Acadia	599	812	−26.2%	1.40	3.6	427.9/sq mi (165.2/km^{2})	1906
Mound	Village	Madison	12	19	−36.8%	0.52	1.3	23.1/sq mi (8.9/km^{2})	1916
Mount Lebanon	Town	Bienville	66	83	−20.5%	4.03	10.4	16.4/sq mi (6.3/km^{2})	1853
Napoleonville†	Village	Assumption	540	660	−18.2%	0.17	0.44	3,176.5/sq mi (1,226.4/km^{2})	1878
Natchez	Village	Natchitoches	489	597	−18.1%	1.03	2.7	474.8/sq mi (183.3/km^{2})	1973
Natchitoches†	City	Natchitoches	18,039	18,323	−1.5%	22.69	58.8	795.0/sq mi (307.0/km^{2})	1714
Newellton	Town	Tensas	886	1,187	−25.4%	0.76	2.0	1,165.8/sq mi (450.1/km^{2})	1900
New Iberia†	City	Iberia	28,555	30,617	−6.7%	11.14	28.9	2,563.3/sq mi (989.7/km^{2})	1839
New Llano	Town	Vernon	2,213	2,504	−11.6%	2.67	6.9	828.8/sq mi (320.0/km^{2})	1942
New Orleans†	Consolidated; Government	Orleans	383,997	343,829	+11.7%	169.49	439.0	2,265.6/sq mi (874.8/km^{2})	1805
New Roads†	City	Pointe Coupee	4,549	4,831	−5.8%	4.58	11.9	993.2/sq mi (383.5/km^{2})	1894
Noble	Village	Sabine	200	252	−20.6%	1.03	2.7	194.2/sq mi (75.0/km^{2})	1901
North Hodge	Village	Jackson	296	388	−23.7%	0.68	1.8	435.3/sq mi (168.1/km^{2})	1953
Norwood	Village	East Feliciana	279	322	−13.4%	4.08	10.6	68.4/sq mi (26.4/km^{2})	1948
Oakdale	City	Allen	6,692	7,780	−14.0%	5.19	13.4	1,289.4/sq mi (497.8/km^{2})	1913
Oak Grove†	Town	West Carroll	1,441	1,727	−16.6%	1.72	4.5	837.8/sq mi (323.5/km^{2})	1909
Oak Ridge	Village	Morehouse	124	144	−13.9%	0.99	2.6	125.3/sq mi (48.4/km^{2})	1882
Oberlin†	Town	Allen	1,402	1,770	−20.8%	4.38	11.3	320.1/sq mi (123.6/km^{2})	1900
Oil City	Town	Caddo	901	1,008	−10.6%	1.78	4.6	506.2/sq mi (195.4/km^{2})	1940
Olla	Town	La Salle	1,295	1,385	−6.5%	3.93	10.2	329.5/sq mi (127.2/km^{2})	1899
Opelousas†	City	St. Landry	15,786	16,634	−5.1%	9.67	25.0	1,632.5/sq mi (630.3/km^{2})	1906
Palmetto	Village	St. Landry	92	164	−43.9%	0.89	2.3	103.4/sq mi (39.9/km^{2})	1912
Parks	Village	St. Martin	640	653	−2.0%	0.85	2.2	752.9/sq mi (290.7/km^{2})	1898
Patterson	City	St. Mary	5,931	6,112	−3.0%	2.52	6.5	2,353.6/sq mi (908.7/km^{2})	1906
Pearl River	Town	St. Tammany	2,565	2,506	+2.4%	3.73	9.7	687.7/sq mi (265.5/km^{2})	1906
Pine Prairie	Village	Evangeline	1,490	1,610	−7.5%	1.61	4.2	925.5/sq mi (357.3/km^{2})	1959
Pineville	City	Rapides	14,384	14,555	−1.2%	12.60	32.6	1,141.6/sq mi (440.8/km^{2})	1878
Pioneer	Village	West Carroll	149	156	−4.5%	1.09	2.8	136.7/sq mi (52.8/km^{2})	1911
Plain Dealing	Town	Bossier	893	1,015	−12.0%	1.58	4.1	565.2/sq mi (218.2/km^{2})	1890
Plaquemine†	City	Iberville	6,269	7,119	−11.9%	2.92	7.6	2,146.9/sq mi (828.9/km^{2})	1838
Plaucheville	Village	Avoyelles	221	248	−10.9%	1.51	3.9	146.4/sq mi (56.5/km^{2})	1903
Pleasant Hill	Village	Sabine	617	723	−14.7%	1.62	4.2	380.9/sq mi (147.1/km^{2})	1874
Pollock	Town	Grant	394	469	−16.0%	7.84	20.3	50.3/sq mi (19.4/km^{2})	1911
Ponchatoula	City	Tangipahoa	7,822	6,559	+19.3%	4.73	12.3	1,653.7/sq mi (638.5/km^{2})	1861
Port Allen†	City	West Baton Rouge	4,939	5,180	−4.7%	2.84	7.4	1,739.1/sq mi (671.5/km^{2})	1916
Port Barre	Town	St. Landry	1,751	2,055	−14.8%	1.08	2.8	1,621.3/sq mi (626.0/km^{2})	1911
Port Vincent	Village	Livingston	646	741	−12.8%	1.70	4.4	380.0/sq mi (146.7/km^{2})	1952
Powhatan	Village	Natchitoches	101	135	−25.2%	0.54	1.4	187.0/sq mi (72.2/km^{2})	1963
Provencal	Village	Natchitoches	528	611	−13.6%	2.46	6.4	214.6/sq mi (82.9/km^{2})	1956
Quitman	Village	Jackson	160	181	−11.6%	0.93	2.4	172.0/sq mi (66.4/km^{2})	1903
Rayne	City	Acadia	7,236	7,953	−9.0%	3.79	9.8	1,909.2/sq mi (737.2/km^{2})	1882
Rayville†	Town	Richland	3,347	3,695	−9.4%	2.31	6.0	1,448.9/sq mi (559.4/km^{2})	1889
Reeves	Village	Allen	221	232	−4.7%	2.42	6.3	91.3/sq mi (35.3/km^{2})	1911
Richmond	Village	Madison	511	577	−11.4%	1.66	4.3	307.8/sq mi (118.9/km^{2})	1973
Richwood	Town	Ouachita	3,881	3,392	+14.4%	2.52	6.5	1,540.1/sq mi (594.6/km^{2})	1974
Ridgecrest	Town	Concordia	583	694	−16.0%	0.43	1.1	1,355.8/sq mi (523.5/km^{2})	1961
Ringgold	Town	Bienville	1,379	1,495	−7.8%	2.32	6.0	594.4/sq mi (229.5/km^{2})	1855
Robeline	Village	Natchitoches	117	174	−32.8%	1.19	3.1	98.3/sq mi (38.0/km^{2})	1914
Rodessa	Village	Caddo	192	270	−28.9%	1.20	3.1	160.0/sq mi (61.8/km^{2})	1967
Rosedale	Village	Iberville	664	793	−16.3%	7.78	20.2	85.3/sq mi (33.0/km^{2})	1955
Roseland	Town	Tangipahoa	880	1,123	−21.6%	2.08	5.4	423.1/sq mi (163.4/km^{2})	1922
Rosepine	Town	Vernon	1,519	1,692	−10.2%	2.43	6.3	625.1/sq mi (241.4/km^{2})	1902
Ruston†	City	Lincoln	22,166	21,859	+1.4%	21.14	54.8	1,048.5/sq mi (404.8/km^{2})	1884
St. Francisville†	Town	West Feliciana	1,557	1,765	−11.8%	1.83	4.7	850.8/sq mi (328.5/km^{2})	1813
St. Gabriel	City	Iberville	6,433	6,677	−3.7%	29.66	76.8	216.9/sq mi (83.7/km^{2})	1994
St. George	City	East Baton Rouge (Note: The city of St. George was created by vote on October 12, 2019 and this change is not included in the 2020 or 2010 census figures.)	—	—	—	—	—	—	2019
St. Joseph†	Town	Tensas	831	1,176	−29.3%	0.89	2.3	933.7/sq mi (360.5/km^{2})	1901
St. Martinville†	City	St. Martin	5,379	6,114	−12.0%	3.05	7.9	1,763.6/sq mi (680.9/km^{2})	1817
Saline	Village	Bienville	265	277	−4.3%	1.19	3.1	222.7/sq mi (86.0/km^{2})	1905
Sarepta	Town	Webster	717	891	−19.5%	1.63	4.2	439.9/sq mi (169.8/km^{2})	1955
Scott	City	Lafayette	8,119	8,614	−5.7%	11.71	30.3	693.3/sq mi (267.7/km^{2})	1907
Shongaloo	Village	Webster	151	182	−17.0%	7.90	20.5	19.1/sq mi (7.4/km^{2})	1967
Shreveport†	City	Bossier, Caddo	187,593	199,311	−5.9%	107.80	279.2	1,740.2/sq mi (671.9/km^{2})	1839
Sibley	Town	Webster	1,127	1,218	−7.5%	3.89	10.1	289.7/sq mi (111.9/km^{2})	1905
Sicily Island	Village	Catahoula	366	526	−30.4%	0.57	1.5	642.1/sq mi (247.9/km^{2})	1947
Sikes	Village	Winn	112	119	−5.9%	1.56	4.0	71.8/sq mi (27.7/km^{2})	1946
Simmesport	Town	Avoyelles	1,468	2,161	−32.1%	2.19	5.7	670.3/sq mi (258.8/km^{2})	1925
Simpson	Village	Vernon	585	638	−8.3%	8.12	21.0	72.0/sq mi (27.8/km^{2})	1967
Simsboro	Village	Lincoln	803	841	−4.5%	3.48	9.0	230.7/sq mi (89.1/km^{2})	1906
Slaughter	Town	East Feliciana	1,035	997	+3.8%	5.47	14.2	189.2/sq mi (73.1/km^{2})	1889
Slidell	City	St. Tammany	28,781	27,068	+6.3%	15.04	39.0	1,913.6/sq mi (738.9/km^{2})	1888
Sorrento	Town	Ascension	1,514	1,401	+8.1%	3.65	9.5	414.8/sq mi (160.2/km^{2})	1956
South Mansfield	Village	De Soto	333	346	−3.8%	0.68	1.8	489.7/sq mi (189.1/km^{2})	1911
Spearsville	Village	Union	126	137	−8.0%	2.37	6.1	53.2/sq mi (20.5/km^{2})	1958
Springfield	Town	Livingston	427	487	−12.3%	1.41	3.7	302.8/sq mi (116.9/km^{2})	1838
Springhill	City	Webster	4,801	5,269	−8.9%	6.21	16.1	773.1/sq mi (298.5/km^{2})	1902
Stanley	Village	De Soto	132	107	+23.4%	2.17	5.6	60.8/sq mi (23.5/km^{2})	1953
Sterlington	Town	Ouachita	1,980	1,594	+24.2%	2.83	7.3	699.6/sq mi (270.1/km^{2})	1961
Stonewall	Town	De Soto	2,273	1,814	+25.3%	8.51	22.0	267.1/sq mi (103.1/km^{2})	1972
Sulphur	City	Calcasieu	21,809	20,410	+6.9%	11.22	29.1	1,943.8/sq mi (750.5/km^{2})	1914
Sun	Village	St. Tammany	392	470	−16.6%	4.27	11.1	91.8/sq mi (35.4/km^{2})	1958
Sunset	Town	St. Landry	2,909	2,897	+0.4%	3.23	8.4	900.6/sq mi (347.7/km^{2})	1904
Tallulah†	City	Madison	6,286	7,335	−14.3%	2.78	7.2	2,261.2/sq mi (873.0/km^{2})	1902
Tangipahoa	Village	Tangipahoa	425	748	−43.2%	1.01	2.6	420.8/sq mi (162.5/km^{2})	1959
Thibodaux†	City	Lafourche	15,948	14,566	+9.5%	6.79	17.6	2,348.7/sq mi (906.9/km^{2})	1838
Tickfaw	Village	Tangipahoa	635	694	−8.5%	1.61	4.2	394.4/sq mi (152.3/km^{2})	1957
Tullos	Town	La Salle, Winn	304	385	−21.0%	1.58	4.1	192.4/sq mi (74.3/km^{2})	1926
Turkey Creek	Village	Evangeline	394	441	−10.7%	2.48	6.4	158.9/sq mi (61.3/km^{2})	1956
Urania	Town	La Salle	698	1,313	−46.8%	1.37	3.5	509.5/sq mi (196.7/km^{2})	1969
Varnado	Village	Washington	330	1,461	−77.4%	0.85	2.2	388.2/sq mi (149.9/km^{2})	1914
Vidalia†	Town	Concordia	4,027	4,299	−6.3%	2.59	6.7	1,554.8/sq mi (600.3/km^{2})	1870
Vienna	Town	Lincoln	483	386	+25.1%	3.47	9.0	139.2/sq mi (53.7/km^{2})	1873
Ville Platte†	City	Evangeline	6,303	7,430	−15.2%	4.02	10.4	1,567.9/sq mi (605.4/km^{2})	1858
Vinton	Town	Calcasieu	3,400	3,212	+5.9%	5.11	13.2	665.4/sq mi (256.9/km^{2})	1910
Vivian	Town	Caddo	3,073	3,671	−16.3%	5.52	14.3	556.7/sq mi (214.9/km^{2})	1898
Walker	Town	Livingston	6,374	6,138	+3.8%	6.59	17.1	967.2/sq mi (373.4/km^{2})	1909
Washington	Town	St. Landry	742	964	−23.0%	0.83	2.1	894.0/sq mi (345.2/km^{2})	1835
Waterproof	Town	Tensas	541	688	−21.4%	0.70	1.8	772.9/sq mi (298.4/km^{2})	1872
Welsh	Town	Jefferson Davis	3,333	3,226	+3.3%	6.32	16.4	527.4/sq mi (203.6/km^{2})	1888
Westlake	City	Calcasieu	4,781	4,568	+4.7%	3.69	9.6	1,295.7/sq mi (500.3/km^{2})	1899
West Monroe	City	Ouachita	13,103	13,065	+0.3%	8.03	20.8	1,631.8/sq mi (630.0/km^{2})	1945
Westwego	City	Jefferson	8,568	8,534	+0.4%	3.12	8.1	2,746.2/sq mi (1,060.3/km^{2})	1919
White Castle	Town	Iberville	1,722	1,883	−8.6%	0.73	1.9	2,358.9/sq mi (910.8/km^{2})	1884
Wilson	Village	East Feliciana	348	595	−41.5%	2.71	7.0	128.4/sq mi (49.6/km^{2})	1899
Winnfield†	City	Winn	4,153	4,840	−14.2%	3.64	9.4	1,140.9/sq mi (440.5/km^{2})	1900
Winnsboro†	Town	Franklin	4,862	4,910	−1.0%	4.00	10.4	1,215.5/sq mi (469.3/km^{2})	1902
Wisner	Town	Franklin	771	964	−20.0%	0.80	2.1	963.8/sq mi (372.1/km^{2})	1938
Woodworth	Town	Rapides	1,762	1,096	+60.8%	8.88	23.0	198.4/sq mi (76.6/km^{2})	1942
Youngsville	City	Lafayette	15,929	8,105	+96.5%	12.19	31.6	1,306.7/sq mi (504.5/km^{2})	1908
Zachary	City	East Baton Rouge	19,316	14,960	+29.1%	26.14	67.7	738.9/sq mi (285.3/km^{2})	1882
Zwolle	Town	Sabine	1,638	1,759	−6.9%	4.56	11.8	359.2/sq mi (138.7/km^{2})	1898
Total	—	—	2,162,160	2,517,844	−14.1%	3,402.15	8,811.5	1,251.3/sq mi (483.1/km^{2})	—

== See also ==
- Louisiana census statistical areas
- List of census-designated places in Louisiana
- List of unincorporated communities in Louisiana
