= Lynching of John Cecil Jones =

American lynching victim (1915–1946)

John Cecil Jones
- Born: July 9, 1915; Cotton Valley, Louisiana, United States
- Died: August 8, 1946 (aged 31); Webster Parish, Louisiana
- Spouse: Carrie Lee Jones
- Military career
- Allegiance: United States
- Branch: United States Army
- Rank: Corporal
- Conflicts: World War II

John Cecil Jones (July 9, 1915 – August 8, 1946) was a United States Army corporal and World War II veteran who was tortured and lynched near Minden, in Webster Parish, Louisiana by a mob in 1946. His 17-year-old cousin Albert Harris Jr. was tortured and left for dead alongside Jones. This was the only known post-World War II lynching to occur in Louisiana, and it involved multiple well-known local individuals, politicians, and a cover-up by multiple law enforcement entities.

== Background ==
On the night of July 30, 1946, a pregnant woman complained to her husband that she had been startled by a prowler in their yard.

The next day, the husband looked around his yard and found that a window screen had been tampered with, along with some grass and a portion of the fence that surrounded the yard. He looked to the neighboring house and saw Albert Harris Jr. holding a stick and sitting on the front porch. The husband talked to his father, and ultimately two civilians and two Webster Parish Sheriff's Deputies went to the Harris house and arrested Albert Jr. He was held in jail for a few days without charge and released by Webster Parish Deputy Sheriff O.H. Haynes Jr. in Dixie Inn to a mob.

The mob took Albert Jr. to a field in rural Webster Parish, tied him upside down to a pipe, covered his head, and at gunpoint, they forced him by way of multiple beatings to implicate his cousin (Jones) as an accomplice in the alleged prowling. After Albert Jr. was released by the mob, his parents sent him out of the state. On August 3, 1946, two deputies, including Haynes, went to the Harris' house to procure Albert Jr.

One of the deputies smashed Albert Harris, Sr.'s jaw and told him to bring Albert Jr. back into custody. Albert Jr. was returned to the sheriff's custody August 4. Jones had been arrested on August 3 in connection with the matter. While both men were in jail, they were questioned by the husband's father and deputies. They were also beaten by deputies. They were held several days without charge.

== Torture and lynching ==
On the night of August 8, 1946, both men were released by Deputy Sheriff O.H. Haynes Jr. to a mob in front of the jail. Almost immediately upon release, Jones understood what was happening and began to protest, but he was hit over the head with the butt of a gun, knocking him unconscious and limp. He had to be carried under the arms and loaded into one of the mob's two idling cars. They were driven outside of Minden to a private pond, where they were tortured and mutilated with clubs, sticks, strops, and a blowtorch.

Despite the violence, Albert Jr. had not been done in, and he awoke to the cries and moans of his cousin. Jones asked Albert to get him some water, and to take care of his German pistol that he had brought back from Germany. Jones died in Albert's arms after about 5 minutes. Albert walked for miles into Minden, hiding from passing cars. When stopped by a Minden Police car, the officers obviously had been apprised of what had happened because they asked him where the "other boy was." Albert went to a family member's house in Minden, and ultimately escaped to Chicago and then Detroit.

== Aftermath and trial ==
On August 9, the Webster Parish Coroner, Dr. Richardson, was notified that some fishermen had found a body on a private pond. Louisiana NAACP officials became aware of the lynching and investigated. The Louisiana NAACP officials had not been exposed to depravity of this nature, as they would soon discover. During the NAACP investigation, a Minden embalmer told them that "Jones had been burned about the face and body with a blowtorch, that he was mutilated and that his wrists were gouged out with a cleaver and that his eyeballs had popped out of his skull."

Many northern newspapers picked up the story, and Time published an article in the August 26, 1946 edition. Two other 1946 lynchings had occurred in Columbia, Tennessee and Monroe, Georgia, prior to the Minden debacle. Despite resistance and consternation from J. Edgar Hoover, and a no bill returned from a local grand jury, the FBI began a thorough investigation at the behest of Thurgood Marshall and U.S. Attorney General Tom Clark.

A Federal grand jury indicted six mob members on October 16, 1946, including Webster Parish Sheriff's Deputies O.H. Haynes Jr. and Charles Edwards, and Minden Police Chief Benjamin Gantt. The defendants were charged with violating three sections of Title 18 of the U.S. Code. The charges against Gantt were eventually dismissed by U.S. Attorney Malcolm Lafargue as part of his deal to testify against the others.

Early motions were filed challenging the sufficiency and constitutionality of the counts in the indictment, but they were quashed by Judge Gaston Porterie. Harris Jr. and his father had endured many hours of FBI interviews, as well as having to return to Louisiana from the North and testify in what was a hostile atmosphere. Both father and son were composed and able to remember all of the details of the ordeal that they had experienced.

The defense strategy was to paint the father and son as willing dupes of the NAACP, and to affirm the Southern strategy of disdain of federal intervention in civil rights matters. Defense witnesses and alibis were easily refuted by the U.S. Attorney. Under defense questioning, Harris Jr. could not place three of the five defendants at the scene of the crimes- even though he had always maintained that he only saw the complainant's husband's father and Deputy Sheriff O.H. Haynes Jr. during the ordeal.

Various federal witnesses were attacked by the defense as having been told what to say and testify to in court. Three people testified, concerning Jones' alibi, that he had been playing dominoes at their house during the time of the alleged prowler in the yard, but they were attacked by the defense and accused of being told what to say by the FBI. A trustee testified that he had seen Deputy Haynes Jr. and another deputy beat Jones and Harris Jr. in the jail a day before they were released.

Most damaging of all was the testimony of Benjamin Gantt, Minden Police Chief, whose statement indicated that Deputy Haynes Jr. had deprived the victims of their rights under color of law multiple times and had also conspired with the mob members. Other witnesses testified, including the coroner, Dr. Richardson. Jones had been accused of having lewd pictures on his person, but they were undoubtedly planted postmortem. Various phone-company employees testified that they had witnessed the commotion outside of the jail on August 8.

Two brothers testified that they saw two of the mob members driving their cars- which matched the description given by countless witnesses of the August 8 release from jail- to Minden from Cotton Valley, in the evening hours of August 8. In the end, none of the evidence could defeat Jim Crow and the Southern strategy. All five defendants were acquitted by a jury of twelve white men.
