= North Louisiana =

Coordinates: 32.6°N 92.6°W

North Louisiana Louisiane du Nord (French)
- Region
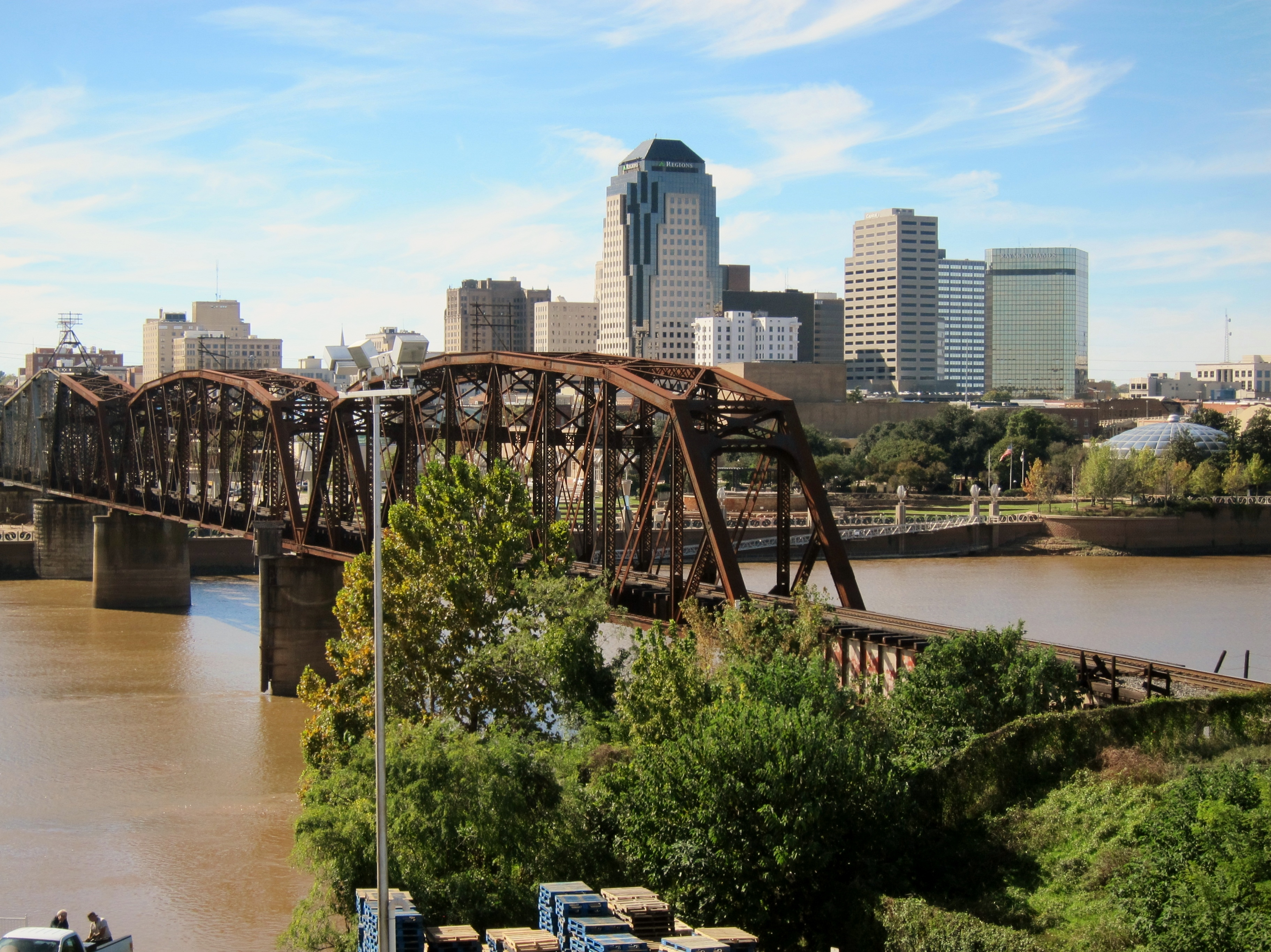
- Downtown Shreveport, Louisiana

- The North region is shaded in brown.
- Country: United States
- State: Louisiana
- Principal cities: Shreveport; Bossier City; Monroe; Ruston; West Monroe; Minden; Bastrop

Population (2020)
  - Total: 830,266

North Louisiana (French: Louisiane du Nord), also known locally as Sportsman's Paradise, (a name sometimes attributed to the state as a whole) is a region in the U.S. state of Louisiana. The region has two metropolitan areas: Shreveport-Bossier City and Monroe-West Monroe, two micropolitian areas: Ruston micropolitan area and Minden micropolitan area, and two combined statistical areas: Shreveport–Bossier City–Minden CSA and Monroe–Ruston Combined Statistical Area. The Shreveport area has the largest metropolitan and CSA by population in North Louisiana.

== Geography ==
The northwestern portion of Louisiana is culturally and economically attached to Northeast Texas and Southwest Arkansas. Combined they comprise the Ark-La-Tex area, just as the northeastern portion of Louisiana, Southeast Arkansas, and Northwest Mississippi are known as the Ark-La-Miss. The Louisiana Central Hill Country, the hilly areas of LaSalle, Grant, Winn, Caldwell, Natchitoches, Jackson, Lincoln, and Bienville parishes, extend into portions of North Louisiana's border with Central Louisiana.

=== Metropolitan and micropolitan areas ===
There are two combined statistical areas, two metropolitan statistical areas, and two micropolitan statistical areas that include North Louisiana parishes.

- Shreveport–Bossier City metropolitan area
- Monroe-West Monroe metropolitan statistical area
- Ruston micropolitan statistical area
- Minden Micropolitan Statistical Area
- Monroe–Ruston combined statistical area
- Shreveport-Bossier City-Minden combined statistical area

=== Parishes ===
North Louisiana consists of the following 20 parishes:

- Bienville
- Bossier
- Caddo
- Caldwell
- Claiborne
- DeSoto
- East Carroll
- Franklin
- Jackson
- Lincoln
- Madison
- Morehouse
- Ouachita
- Red River
- Richland
- Tensas
- Union
- Webster
- West Carroll
- Winn

== See also ==
- Intrastate regions
- Driskill Mountain
- North Louisiana Historical Association
