= Midway, Webster Parish, Louisiana =

Midway, Louisiana
- Unincorporated community
- Hamlet of Midway
- Location within Louisiana Location within the United States
- Coordinates: 32°55′19″N 93°27′13″W
- Country: United States
- State: Louisiana
- Parish: Webster
- Elevation: 262 ft (80 m)
- Time zone: UTC-6 (Central (CST))
  - Summer (DST): UTC-5 (CDT)
- Area code: 318
- GNIS feature ID: 537068

Midway is an unincorporated community in Webster Parish, Louisiana, United States. Midway is located on U.S. Route 371, 2 miles (3.2 km) north of Sarepta.
