= Webster Parish, Louisiana =

Parish in Louisiana, United States

Coordinates: 32.70°N 93.33°W

- Parish
- Parish of Webster; Paroisse de Webster (French)
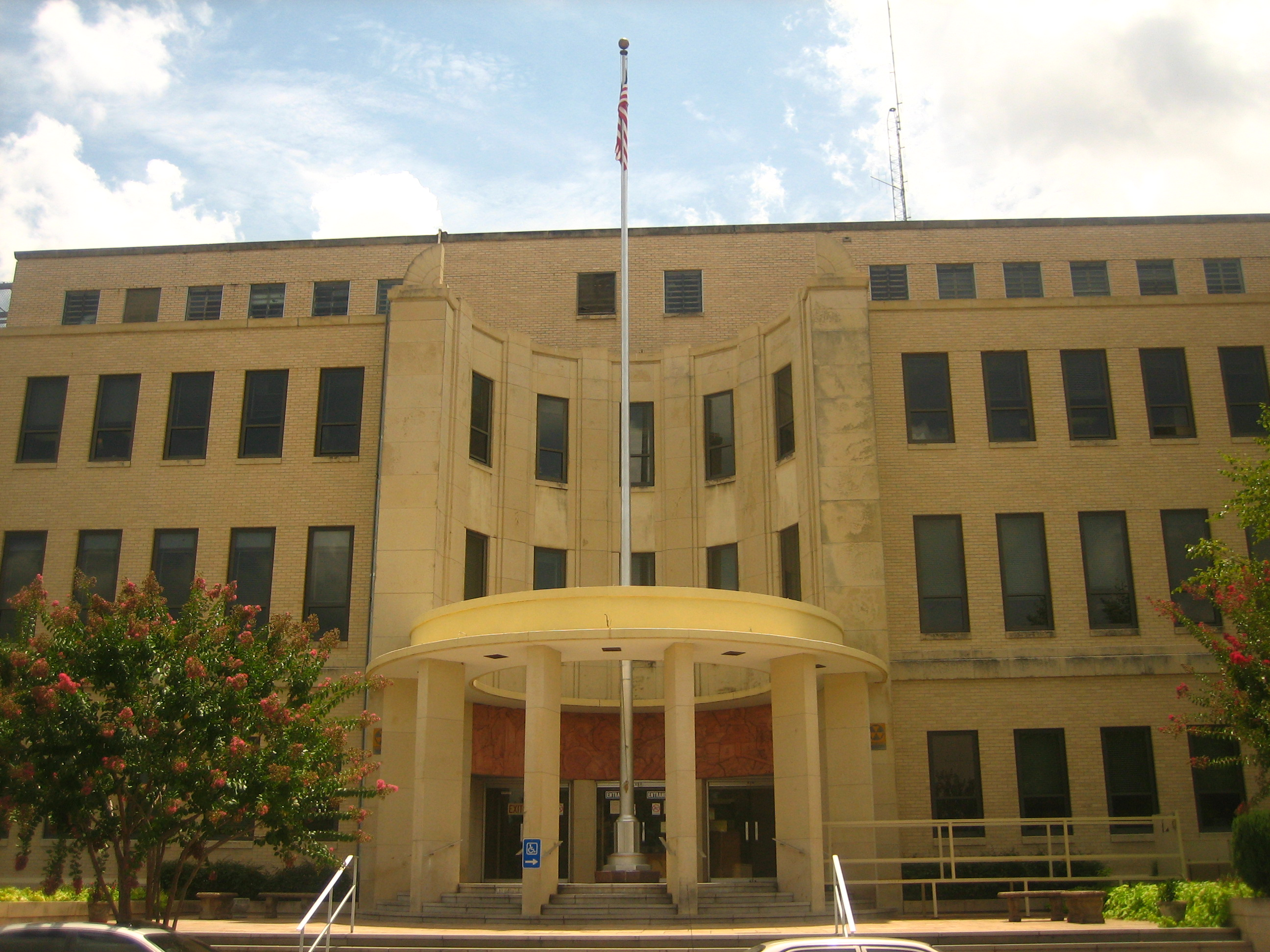
- Webster Parish Courthouse in Minden (dedicated May 1, 1953) was a project of the contractor George A. Caldwell.

- Location within the U.S. state of Louisiana

- Louisiana's location within the U.S.
- Country: United States
- State: Louisiana
- Region: North Louisiana
- Founded: 1871
- Named for: Daniel Webster
- Parish seat (and largest city): Minden

Area
  - Total: 615 sq mi (1,590 km^{2})
  - Land: 593 sq mi (1,540 km^{2})
  - Water: 22 sq mi (57 km^{2})
  - percentage: 3.5 sq mi (9.1 km^{2})

Population (2020)
  - Total: 36,967
  - Estimate (2025): 34,948 ▼
  - Rank: LA: 29th
  - Density: 62.3/sq mi (24.1/km^{2})
- Time zone: UTC-6 (CST)
  - Summer (DST): UTC-5 (CDT)
- Area code: 318
- Congressional district: 4th
- Website: Parish of Webster

Webster Parish (French: Paroisse de Webster) is a parish located in the northwestern section of the U.S. state of Louisiana. The parish seat and largest city is Minden.

As of the 2020 census, the Webster Parish population was 36,967. Public officials who have long sought to increase the industrial potential of the parish, expressed concern over the decline. Jim Bonsall, the president of the Webster Parish Police Jury, the parish governing body, cited the ending of the Haynesville Shale boom as the primary reason for the population losses. The parish has long depended on jobs in the petroleum and natural gas fields.

The parish is named for 19th-century American statesman Daniel Webster of Massachusetts and New Hampshire. It was established on February 27, 1871 from lands formerly belonging to Bienville, Bossier, and Claiborne parishes. The parish centennial celebration was held in May 1971. Speakers included Police jury president Leland Garland Mims and Judge Enos McClendon of the Louisiana 26th Judicial District Court, who gave a biographical sketch of Daniel Webster. Many officials and parish employees dressed in period costume of the 1870s for the event.

Webster Parish is part of the Shreveport–Bossier City–Minden CSA.

Among the first settlers in Webster Parish was Newett Drew, a native of Virginia, who about 1818 established a grist mill at the former Overton community near Minden. At this time the area was Natchitoches Parish and later Overton became the Parish Seat of Claiborne Parish in 1836 until it moved in 1848. His son, Richard Maxwell Drew was born in Overton and served as a district judge and state representative prior to his death in 1850 at the age of twenty-eight. R. M. Drew's descendants held judicial or legislative positions in Webster Parish as well, Richard Cleveland Drew, Harmon Caldwell Drew, R. Harmon Drew, Sr., and Harmon Drew, Jr.

== Geography ==
According to the U.S. Census Bureau, the parish has a total area of 615 square miles (1,590 km^{2}), of which 593 square miles (1,540 km^{2}) is land and 22 square miles (57 km^{2}) (3.5%) is water.

=== Major highways ===
- Interstate 20
- Future Interstate 69
- U.S. Highway 79
- U.S. Highway 80
- U.S. Highway 371
- Louisiana Highway 2
  - LA 2 Alt.
- Louisiana Highway 157
- Louisiana Highway 159
- Louisiana Highway 160
- Louisiana Highway 163
- Louisiana Highway 164
- Louisiana Highway 516
- Louisiana Highway 518
- Louisiana Highway 521
- Louisiana Highway 527
- Louisiana Highway 528
- Louisiana Highway 531
- Louisiana Highway 532
- Louisiana Highway 533
- Louisiana Highway 615
- Louisiana Highway 792
- Louisiana Highway 793
- Louisiana Highway 802
- Louisiana Highway 803-1
- Louisiana Highway 808
- Louisiana Highway 3008
- Louisiana Highway 3014

=== Adjacent counties and parishes ===
- Lafayette County, Arkansas (north)
- Columbia County, Arkansas (northeast)
- Claiborne Parish (east)
- Bienville Parish (southeast)
- Bossier Parish (west)

=== National protected areas ===
- Kisatchie National Forest (part)
- Caney Lakes Recreation Area near Minden (not to be confused with another Caney Lake near Jonesboro, Louisiana)

== Communities ==
=== Cities ===
- Minden (parish seat and largest municipality)
- Springhill

=== Towns ===
- Cotton Valley
- Cullen
- Sarepta
- Sibley

=== Villages ===
- Dixie Inn
- Doyline
- Dubberly
- Heflin
- Shongaloo

=== Unincorporated communities ===
- Midway
- Yellow Pine

== Demographics ==
Historical population
Census	Pop.	Note	%±
1880	10,005		—
1890	12,466		24.6%
1900	15,125		21.3%
1910	19,186		26.8%
1920	24,707		28.8%
1930	29,458		19.2%
1940	33,676		14.3%
1950	35,704		6.0%
1960	39,701		11.2%
1970	39,939		0.6%
1980	43,631		9.2%
1990	41,989		−3.8%
2000	41,831		−0.4%
2010	41,207		−1.5%
2020	36,967		−10.3%
2025 (est.)	34,948	▼	−5.5%
U.S. Decennial Census; 1790-1960 1900-1990; 1990-2000 2010

=== 2020 census ===
As of the 2020 census, the parish had a population of 36,967.

The median age was 43.3 years. 22.2% of residents were under the age of 18 and 21.1% of residents were 65 years of age or older. For every 100 females there were 91.0 males, and for every 100 females age 18 and over there were 87.4 males age 18 and over.

The racial makeup of the parish was 61.5% White, 33.0% Black or African American, 0.4% American Indian and Alaska Native, 0.4% Asian, <0.1% Native Hawaiian and Pacific Islander, 0.9% from some other race, and 3.8% from two or more races. Hispanic or Latino residents of any race comprised 1.9% of the population.

50.3% of residents lived in urban areas, while 49.7% lived in rural areas.

There were 15,684 households, of which 28.0% had children under the age of 18 living in them. Of all households, 39.8% were married-couple households, 19.7% were households with a male householder and no spouse or partner present, and 34.8% were households with a female householder and no spouse or partner present. About 31.9% of all households were made up of individuals and 15.3% had someone living alone who was 65 years of age or older. There were 10,295 families residing in the parish.

There were 18,236 housing units, of which 14.0% were vacant. Among occupied housing units, 70.0% were owner-occupied and 30.0% were renter-occupied. The homeowner vacancy rate was 1.5% and the rental vacancy rate was 9.3%.

=== Racial and ethnic composition ===
Webster Parish, Louisiana – Racial and ethnic composition Note: the US Census treats Hispanic/Latino as an ethnic category. This table excludes Latinos from the racial categories and assigns them to a separate category. Hispanics/Latinos may be of any race.
Race / Ethnicity (NH = Non-Hispanic)	Pop 1980	Pop 1990	Pop 2000	Pop 2010	Pop 2020	% 1980	% 1990	% 2000	% 2010	% 2020
White alone (NH)	29,406	28,389	27,233	26,067	22,554	67.40%	67.61%	65.10%	63.26%	61.01%
Black or African American alone (NH)	13,696	13,243	13,662	13,756	12,142	31.39%	31.54%	32.66%	33.38%	32.85%
Native American or Alaska Native alone (NH)	53	76	127	138	136	0.12%	0.18%	0.30%	0.33%	0.37%
Asian alone (NH)	41	51	80	116	138	0.09%	0.12%	0.19%	0.28%	0.37%
Native Hawaiian or Pacific Islander alone (NH)	x	x	15	8	12	x	x	0.04%	0.02%	0.03%
Other race alone (NH)	16	1	10	20	76	0.04%	0.00%	0.02%	0.05%	0.21%
Mixed race or Multiracial (NH)	x	x	326	432	1,221	x	x	0.78%	1.05%	3.30%
Hispanic or Latino (any race)	419	229	378	670	688	0.96%	0.55%	0.90%	1.63%	1.86%
Total	43,631	41,989	41,831	41,207	36,967	100.00%	100.00%	100.00%	100.00%	100.00%

=== 2010 census ===
As of the census of 2010 there were 52,903 people, 20,500 households, and 12,589 families residing in the parish. The population density was 92 people per square mile (36 people/km^{2}). There were 18,991 housing units at an average density of 32 units per square mile (12 units/km^{2}). The racial makeup of the parish was 65.51% White, 32.83% Black or African American, 0.34% Native American, 0.19% Asian, 0.04% Pacific Islander, 0.22% from other races, and 0.86% from two or more races. 0.90% of the population were Hispanic or Latino of any race.

There were 16,501 households, of which 30.40% had children under the age of 18 living with them, 49.70% were married couples living together, 16.30% had a female householder with no husband present, and 29.90% were non-families. 27.00% of all households were made up of individuals, and 12.90% had someone living alone who was 65 years of age or older. The average household size was 2.48 and the average family size was 2.99.

In the parish the population was spread out, with 25.60% under the age of 18, 8.60% from 18 to 24, 26.00% from 25 to 44, 23.60% from 45 to 64, and 16.30% who were 65 years of age or older. The median age was 38 years. For every 100 females there were 91.80 males. For every 100 females age 18 and over, there were 88.20 males.

The median income for a household in the parish was $28,408, and the median income for a family was $35,119. Males had a median income of $30,343 versus $20,907 for females. The per capita income for the parish was $15,203. About 15.30% of families and 20.20% of the population were below the poverty line, including 29.60% of those under age 18 and 16.10% of those age 65 or over.

== Law, government, and politics ==
In 1996, the Webster Parish Police Jury approved a $1,849,000 bid to the firm Finney Co. of Shreveport for construction of a new parish library facility on Est and West Street in Minden.

=== Voting performance ===
Webster Parish is generally competitive in most contested elections. The parish voted for Republican Barry Goldwater for president in 1964 and George Wallace in 1968, when the former governor of Alabama ran on the American Independent Party ticket. Richard Nixon won here in 1972, and Jimmy Carter of Georgia prevailed in 1976. In 1984, U.S. President Ronald Reagan won the parish by a nearly two-to-one margin over former Vice President Walter F. Mondale.

In 2000, Governor George W. Bush of Texas won in Webster Parish with 9,420 votes (55.1 percent), compared to then Vice President Al Gore's 7,197 (42.1 percent). Patrick Buchanan of the Reform Party held 183 votes (1.1 percent). In 2004, Bush again won the parish, having polled 11,070 votes (60 percent) to Democrat John Kerry's 6,833 (37 percent).

In 2008, U.S. Senator John McCain of Arizona carried Webster Parish with 11,417 votes (62.5 percent), compared to Barack Obama's 6,610 (36.2 percent). Four years later in 2012, Republican Mitt Romney led in the parish with 11,400 votes (61.9 percent), 17 fewer ballots than McCain had received. In 2012, President Obama polled 6,802 votes (36.9 percent), 192 more than his 2008 tabulation.

The last Democrat hence to have won in Webster Parish at the presidential level was Bill Clinton in 1996, who received 9,688 (55.3 percent), compared to Republican Robert Dole's 6,153 ballots (35.1 percent). Ross Perot, founder of the Reform Party, held 1,324 votes (7.6 percent). In that same election, the Democrat Mary Landrieu carried Webster Parish in her successful U.S. Senate race against Republican Woody Jenkins, 8,459 (51.3 percent) to 8,020 (48.7 percent).

United States presidential election results for Webster Parish, Louisiana
Year	Republican		Democratic		Third party(ies)	
Year	No.	%	No.	%	No.	%
1912	9	1.09%	696	83.96%	124	14.96%
1916	6	0.57%	1,040	99.24%	2	0.19%
1920	112	9.99%	1,009	90.01%	0	0.00%
1924	52	5.03%	929	89.93%	52	5.03%
1928	356	19.93%	1,430	80.07%	0	0.00%
1932	73	2.36%	3,020	97.64%	0	0.00%
1936	301	9.69%	2,799	90.12%	6	0.19%
1940	332	8.07%	3,777	91.83%	4	0.10%
1944	899	19.74%	3,655	80.26%	0	0.00%
1948	455	8.60%	1,933	36.53%	2,903	54.87%
1952	3,442	43.10%	4,544	56.90%	0	0.00%
1956	3,280	48.72%	2,352	34.93%	1,101	16.35%
1960	3,139	40.94%	1,273	16.60%	3,255	42.45%
1964	8,177	82.33%	1,755	17.67%	0	0.00%
1968	2,496	17.81%	2,871	20.49%	8,646	61.70%
1972	8,829	71.50%	2,859	23.15%	661	5.35%
1976	7,550	50.28%	7,286	48.52%	181	1.21%
1980	8,865	50.24%	8,568	48.55%	214	1.21%
1984	12,055	64.54%	6,509	34.85%	113	0.61%
1988	10,204	57.31%	7,434	41.75%	167	0.94%
1992	6,640	36.36%	8,380	45.88%	3,244	17.76%
1996	6,153	35.13%	9,688	55.31%	1,676	9.57%
2000	9,420	55.12%	7,197	42.11%	473	2.77%
2004	11,070	60.00%	6,833	37.04%	546	2.96%
2008	11,417	62.49%	6,610	36.18%	243	1.33%
2012	11,400	61.90%	6,802	36.94%	214	1.16%
2016	11,542	63.61%	6,260	34.50%	343	1.89%
2020	11,830	64.94%	6,172	33.88%	214	1.17%
2024	10,965	67.66%	5,053	31.18%	187	1.15%

== Education ==
The elected Webster Parish School Board operates local public schools.

It is in the service area of Bossier Parish Community College.

== National Guard ==
The 39th MP Company of the 773rd MP Battalion and the 1083rd Transportation Company of the 165th CSS (Combat Service Support) Battalion reside at Camp Minden west of Minden, formerly the Louisiana Army Ammunition Plant. Both of these battalions are part of the 139TH RSG (Regional Support Group).

== Notable people ==
- Alan Bean, astronaut, fourth person to walk on the Moon
- "Sweet Lou" Dunbar, basketball player, 27-year player for the Harlem Globetrotters
- Gene Austin, crooner, singer of "My Blue Heaven," the best-selling American single until 1942
- Marshall H. Twitchell, Reconstruction official, victim of assassination attempt
- John Cecil Jones, World War II veteran and lynching victim
- John L. Nelson, jazz musician under the name Prince Rogers, father of musician Prince
- Charlie Hennigan, AFL All-Star wide receiver
- James Burton, guitarist, member of the Rock and Roll Hall of Fame
- Roger Carr, Pro Bowl NFL wide receiver
- Percy Mayfield, R&B singer
- John David Crow, American football player, coach, and college athletics administrator
- John T. Watkins, eight-term member of the U.S. House of Representatives (1905 to 1921)

== See also ==
- National Register of Historic Places listings in Webster Parish, Louisiana
