= Sibley, Louisiana =

- Town
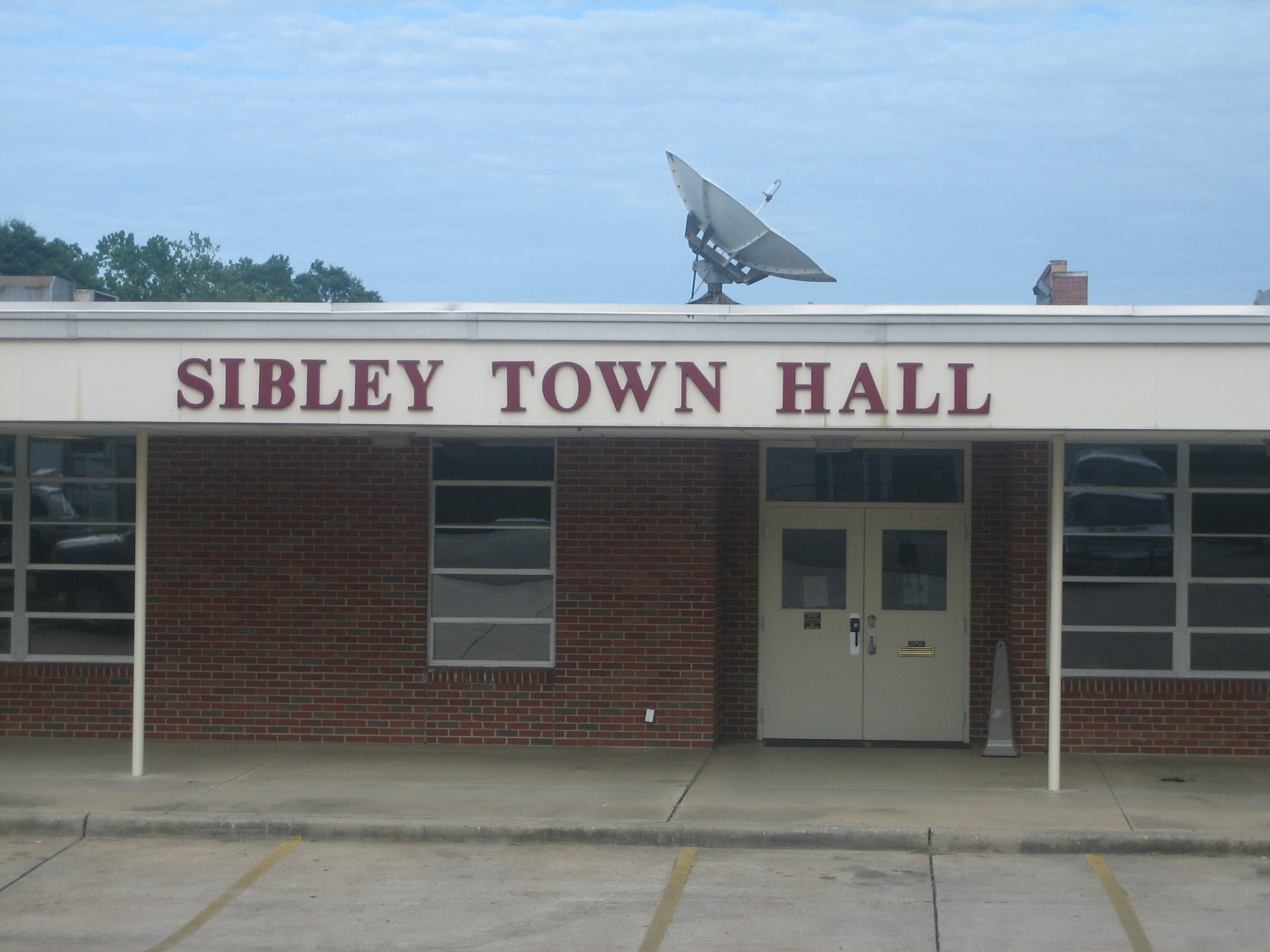
- Sibley Town Hall at site of former Sibley High School

- Location of Sibley in Webster Parish, Louisiana.

- Location of Louisiana in the United States
- Coordinates: 32°32′32″N 93°17′41″W
- Country: United States
- State: Louisiana
- Parish: Webster

Area
  - Total: 4.00 sq mi (10.35 km^{2})
  - Land: 3.88 sq mi (10.06 km^{2})
  - Water: 0.11 sq mi (0.29 km^{2})
- Elevation: 213 ft (65 m)

Population (2020)
  - Total: 1,127
  - Density: 290.0/sq mi (111.98/km^{2})
- Time zone: UTC-6 (CST)
  - Summer (DST): UTC-5 (CDT)
- ZIP code: 71073
- Area code: 318
- FIPS code: 22-70175
- GNIS feature ID: 2407332
- Website: www.sibleyla.com

Sibley is a town in south Webster Parish, Louisiana, United States. As of the 2020 census, Sibley had a population of 1,127. It is part of the Minden Micropolitan Statistical Area.

The former Sibley High School, now known as Lakeside Junior/Senior High School, is located south of town off Louisiana Highway 7. The Sibley Town Hall was relocated to a portion of the former Sibley High School campus.

In a predominantly African American section of the nearby unincorporated community of Yellow Pine is an area formerly known as "King Solomon Hill," centered on an actual hill on which stood King Solomon Hill Baptist Church. (The community is now known as "Salt Works.") The blues historian Gayle Dean Wardlow concluded that it was from this address that Paramount Records chose to give the blues musician Joe Holmes, a resident of Sibley, the recording name of King Solomon Hill.

== Geography ==
According to the United States Census Bureau, the town has a total area of 4.0 square miles (10.4 km^{2}), of which 3.9 square miles (10.0 km^{2}) is land and 0.1 square mile (0.4 km^{2}) (3.49%) is water.

== Demographics ==
Historical population
Census	Pop.	Note	%±
1920	900		—
1930	422		−53.1%
1940	405		−4.0%
1950	623		53.8%
1960	595		−4.5%
1970	869		46.1%
1980	1,211		39.4%
1990	997		−17.7%
2000	1,098		10.1%
2010	1,218		10.9%
2020	1,127		−7.5%
2025 (est.)	1,068	▼	−5.2%
U.S. Decennial Census

Sibley racial composition in 2020
Race	Number	Percentage
White (non-Hispanic)	816	72.4%
Black or African American (non-Hispanic)	237	21.03%
Native American	10	0.89%
Asian	3	0.27%
Other/Mixed	20	1.77%
Hispanic or Latino	41	3.64%

As of the 2020 United States census, there were 1,127 people, 554 households, and 396 families residing in the town.

== Notable people ==
- Provine Bradley (1907-1986), Negro league baseball player
