= Yellow Pine, Louisiana =

- Unincorporated community
- Location within Louisiana Location within the United States
- Coordinates: 32°28′38″N 93°19′28″W
- Country: United States
- State: Louisiana
- Parish: Webster
- Elevation: 203 ft (62 m)
- Time zone: UTC-6 (Central (CST))
  - Summer (DST): UTC-5 (CDT)
- Area code: 318
- GNIS feature ID: 556481

Yellow Pine (also Yellowpine) is an unincorporated community in Webster Parish, Louisiana, United States.

Yellow Pine was also the name of a sawmill camp near Many, Sabine Parish, which was the birthplace (in 1902) of U.S. Representative Ed Gossett.
