= South Mansfield, Louisiana =

- Village
- Village of South Mansfield
- Location of South Mansfield in DeSoto Parish, Louisiana.

- Location of Louisiana in the United States
- Coordinates: 32°00′43″N 93°43′33″W
- Country: United States
- State: Louisiana
- Parish: DeSoto

Area
  - Total: 0.70 sq mi (1.82 km^{2})
  - Land: 0.68 sq mi (1.76 km^{2})
  - Water: 0.023 sq mi (0.06 km^{2})
- Elevation: 341 ft (104 m)

Population (2020)
  - Total: 333
  - Density: 490.2/sq mi (189.28/km^{2})
- Time zone: UTC-6 (CST)
  - Summer (DST): UTC-5 (CDT)
- Area code: 318
- FIPS code: 22-71820
- GNIS feature ID: 2407551

South Mansfield is a village in DeSoto Parish, Louisiana, United States. As of the 2020 census, South Mansfield had a population of 333. It is part of the Shreveport–Bossier City Metropolitan Statistical Area.

== Geography ==
South Mansfield is located in central DeSoto Parish and is bordered to the north by the city of Mansfield, the parish seat.

According to the United States Census Bureau, the village has a total area of 0.69 square miles (1.8 km^{2}), of which 0.02 square miles (0.06 km^{2}), or 3.11%, is water.

== Demographics ==
Historical population
Census	Pop.	Note	%±
1920	441		—
1930	462		4.8%
1940	433		−6.3%
1950	276		−36.3%
1960	616		123.2%
1970	439		−28.7%
1980	1,463		233.3%
1990	407		−72.2%
2000	352		−13.5%
2010	346		−1.7%
2020	333		−3.8%
2025 (est.)	344	▲	3.3%
U.S. Decennial Census

=== 2020 census ===
South Mansfield village, Louisiana – Racial and ethnic composition Note: the US Census treats Hispanic/Latino as an ethnic category. This table excludes Latinos from the racial categories and assigns them to a separate category. Hispanics/Latinos may be of any race.
Race / Ethnicity (NH = Non-Hispanic)	Pop 2000	Pop 2010	Pop 2020	% 2000	% 2010	% 2020
White alone (NH)	81	73	47	23.01%	21.10%	14.11%
Black or African American alone (NH)	258	259	252	73.30%	74.86%	75.68%
Native American or Alaska Native alone (NH)	2	0	3	0.57%	0.00%	0.90%
Asian alone (NH)	0	0	0	0.00%	0.00%	0.00%
Native Hawaiian or Pacific Islander alone (NH)	0	0	0	0.00%	0.00%	0.00%
Other race alone (NH)	0	0	0	0.00%	0.00%	0.00%
Mixed race or Multiracial (NH)	3	9	15	0.85%	2.60%	4.50%
Hispanic or Latino (any race)	8	5	16	2.27%	1.45%	4.80%
Total	352	346	333	100.00%	100.00%	100.00%

=== 2000 census ===
As of the census of 2000, there were 352 people, 154 households, and 93 families residing in the village. The population density was 513.0 inhabitants per square mile (198.1/km^{2}). There were 166 housing units at an average density of 241.9 per square mile (93.4/km^{2}). The racial makeup of the village was 24.43% White, 73.86% African American, 0.57% Native American, 0.28% Asian, and 0.85% from two or more races. Hispanic or Latino of any race were 2.27% of the population.

There were 154 households, out of which 29.2% had children under the age of 18 living with them, 21.4% were married couples living together, 33.1% had a female householder with no husband present, and 39.0% were non-families. 35.7% of all households were made up of individuals, and 20.1% had someone living alone who was 65 years of age or older. The average household size was 2.29 and the average family size was 2.93.

In the village, the population was spread out, with 30.1% under the age of 18, 9.7% from 18 to 24, 22.7% from 25 to 44, 19.9% from 45 to 64, and 17.6% who were 65 years of age or older. The median age was 34 years. For every 100 females, there were 62.2 males. For every 100 females age 18 and over, there were 61.8 males.

The median income for a household in the village was $12,417, and the median income for a family was $24,375. Males had a median income of $25,909 versus $14,000 for females. The per capita income for the village was $11,069. About 44.9% of families and 46.3% of the population were below the poverty line, including 52.4% of those under age 18 and 40.0% of those age 65 or over.
