= Sarepta, Louisiana =

- Town
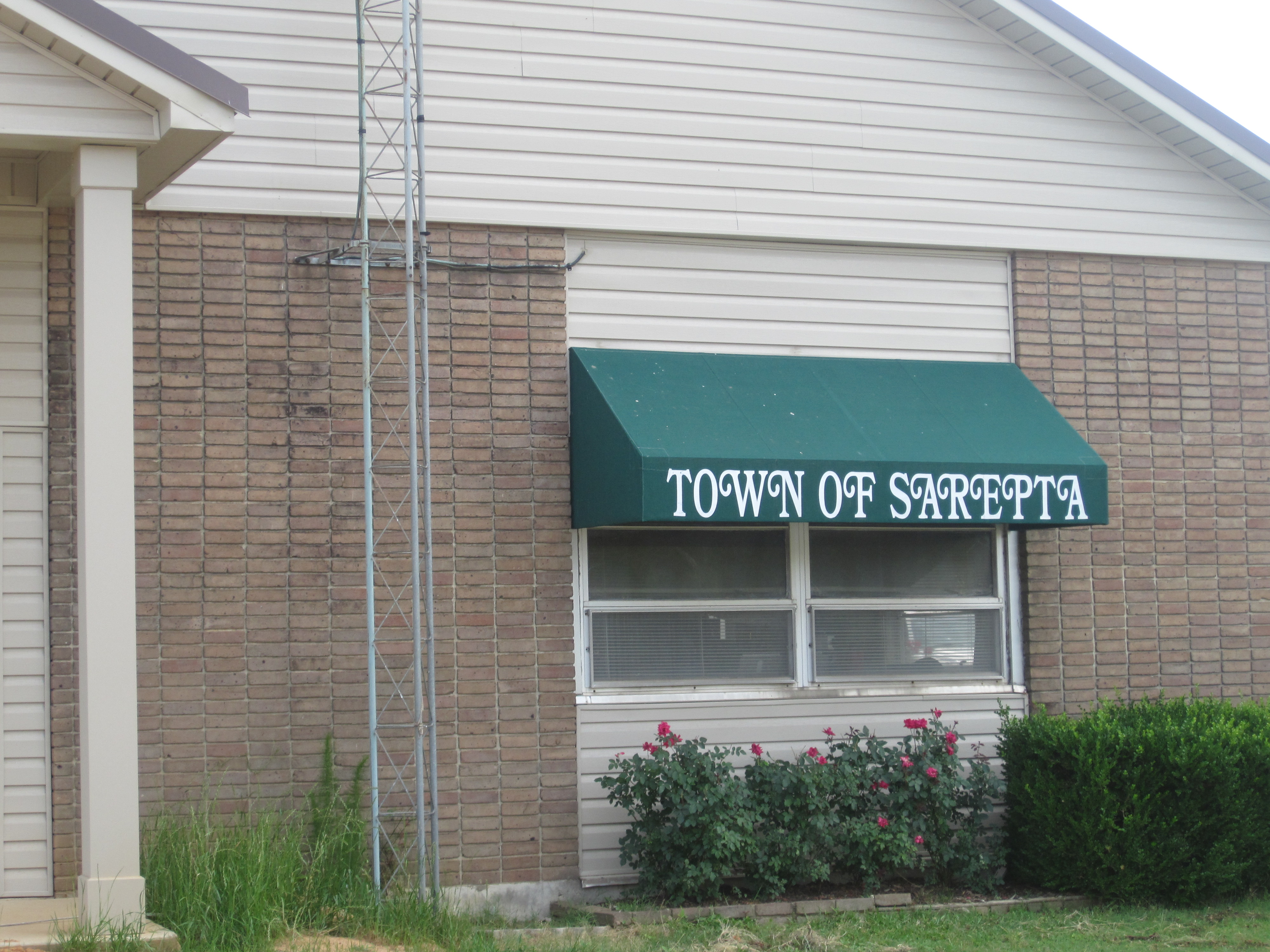
- Sarepta Municipal Building

- Location of Sarepta in Webster Parish, Louisiana.

- Location of Louisiana in the United States
- Coordinates: 32°53′47″N 93°27′06″W
- Country: United States
- State: Louisiana
- Parish: Webster

Area
  - Total: 1.64 sq mi (4.24 km^{2})
  - Land: 1.63 sq mi (4.23 km^{2})
  - Water: 0.0039 sq mi (0.01 km^{2})
- Elevation: 240 ft (73 m)

Population (2020)
  - Total: 717
  - Density: 439.0/sq mi (169.51/km^{2})
- Time zone: UTC-6 (CST)
  - Summer (DST): UTC-5 (CDT)
- ZIP Code: 71071
- Area code: 318
- FIPS code: 22-68125
- GNIS feature ID: 2407292
- Website: townofsarepta.com

Sarepta is a town in Webster Parish, Louisiana, United States. As of the 2020 census, Sarepta had a population of 717. It is part of the Minden Micropolitan Statistical Area.

== Geography ==
According to the United States Census Bureau, the town has a total area of 1.6 square miles (4.2 km^{2}), all land.

== Demographics ==
Historical population
| Census | Pop. | Note | %± |
|---|---|---|---|
| 1960 | 737 | | — |
| 1970 | 882 | | 19.7% |
| 1980 | 831 | | −5.8% |
| 1990 | 886 | | 6.6% |
| 2000 | 925 | | 4.4% |
| 2010 | 891 | | −3.7% |
| 2020 | 717 | | −19.5% |
| 2025 (est.) | 671 | ▼ | −6.4% |
U.S. Decennial Census

Sarepta racial composition as of 2020
| Race | Number | Percentage |
|---|---|---|
| White (non-Hispanic) | 678 | 94.56% |
| Black or African American (non-Hispanic) | 4 | 0.56% |
| Native American | 2 | 0.28% |
| Other/Mixed | 27 | 3.77% |
| Hispanic or Latino | 6 | 0.84% |

As of the 2020 United States census, there were 717 people, 332 households, and 247 families residing in the town.

== Education ==
North Webster Jr. High School is a grade six to eight school.

== Notable people ==
- Trace Adkins, country music singer and actor, and son of mayor Peggy Adkins
