= Cotton Valley, Louisiana =

- Town
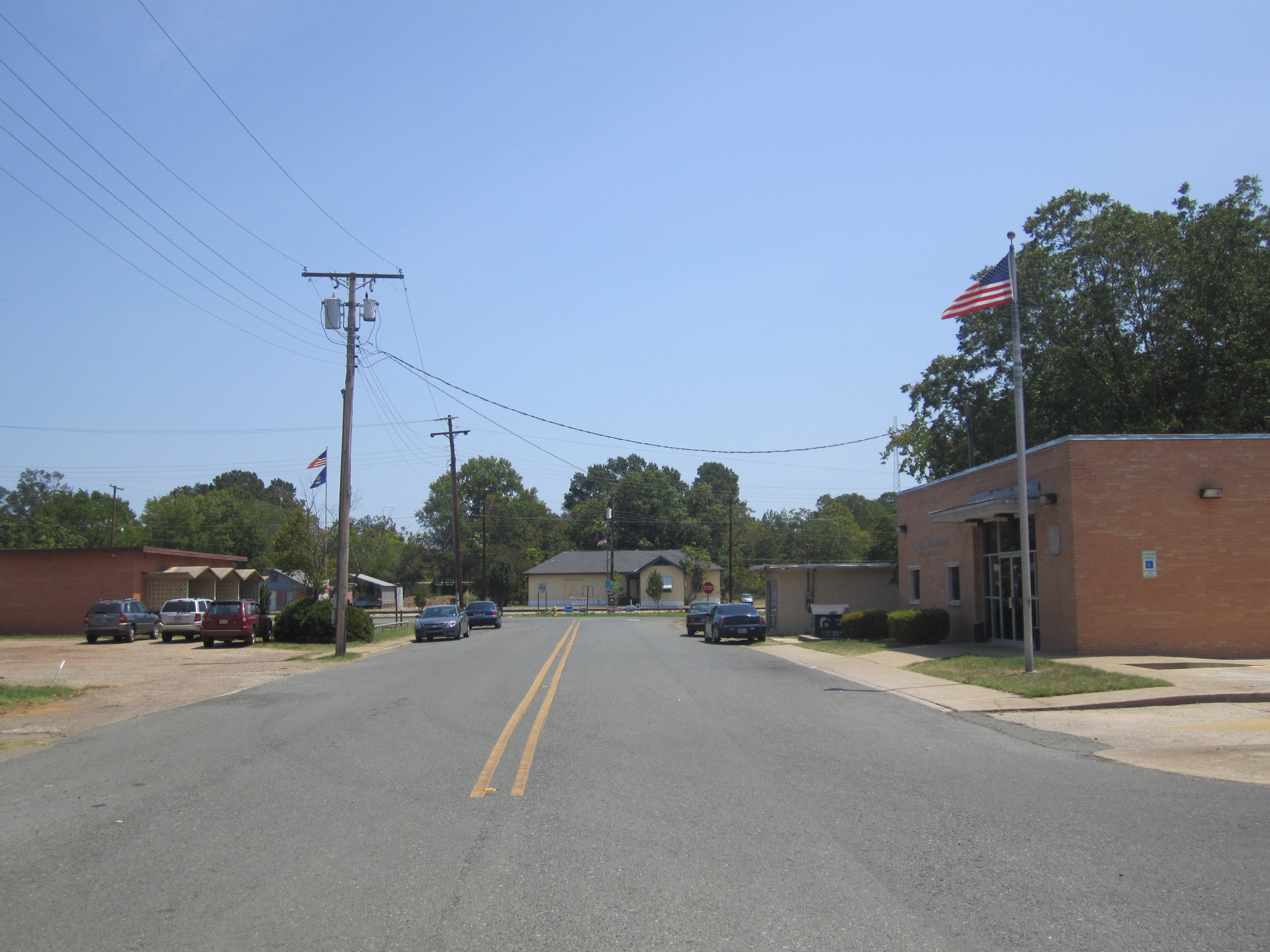
- Downtown Cotton Valley with United States Post Office at the right and municipal building at the left

- Location of Cotton Valley in Webster Parish, Louisiana.

- Location of Louisiana in the United States
- Coordinates: 32°48′49″N 93°25′22″W
- Country: United States
- State: Louisiana
- Parish: Webster

Area
  - Total: 2.64 sq mi (6.85 km^{2})
  - Land: 2.63 sq mi (6.82 km^{2})
  - Water: 0.012 sq mi (0.03 km^{2})
- Elevation: 220 ft (67 m)

Population (2020)
  - Total: 787
  - Density: 299.0/sq mi (115.45/km^{2})
- Time zone: UTC-6 (CST)
  - Summer (DST): UTC-5 (CDT)
- Area code: 318
- FIPS code: 22-17915
- GNIS feature ID: 2406318
- Website: cottonvalley.municipalimpact.com

Cotton Valley is a town in central Webster Parish, Louisiana, United States. As of the 2020 census, Cotton Valley had a population of 787.

== Geography ==
According to the United States Census Bureau, the town has a total area of 2.6 square miles (6.7 km^{2}), all land.

== Demographics ==
Historical population
Census	Pop.	Note	%±
1930	1,133		—
1950	1,188		—
1960	1,145		−3.6%
1970	1,261		10.1%
1980	1,445		14.6%
1990	1,130		−21.8%
2000	1,189		5.2%
2010	1,009		−15.1%
2020	787		−22.0%
2025 (est.)	743	▼	−5.6%
U.S. Decennial Census

Cotton Valley racial composition as of 2020
Race	Number	Percentage
White (non-Hispanic)	380	48.28%
Black or African American (non-Hispanic)	362	46.0%
Native American	15	1.91%
Other/Mixed	18	2.29%
Hispanic or Latino	12	1.52%

As of the 2020 United States census, there were 787 people, 444 households, and 289 families residing in the town.

== Arts and culture ==
A public library replaced the former facility in the old office of Dr. John Pugh, a long-time Cotton Valley physician, who began his practice in 1902.

== Government ==
Cotton Valley was established in the mid-19th century, and incorporated in 1944 when J. B. Roby, a Democrat, became its first mayor. In 1946, Roby was succeeded by A. C. Borland, who served a total of 22 years. An insurance agent, Borland did not seek reelection in 1968 and was succeeded by E. M. Hollingsworth. Borland was credited with the building of the Cotton Valley city hall, recreation center and municipal park. Keith Chanler {Republican} was elected mayor in 2000 and again in 2004 and chose not to run in 2008.

Comerdis Phillips was elected mayor in 2008 Joseph Alexander became mayor in 2016.

== Notable people ==
- Ken Beck, defensive tackle in the NFL Green Bay Packers; born in Minden
- Roger Carr, former National Football League wide receiver who played for various teams.
- The Cox Family consists of Cotton Valley natives noted for their Bluegrass music.
