= Minden, Louisiana =

Minden
- City
- City of Minden
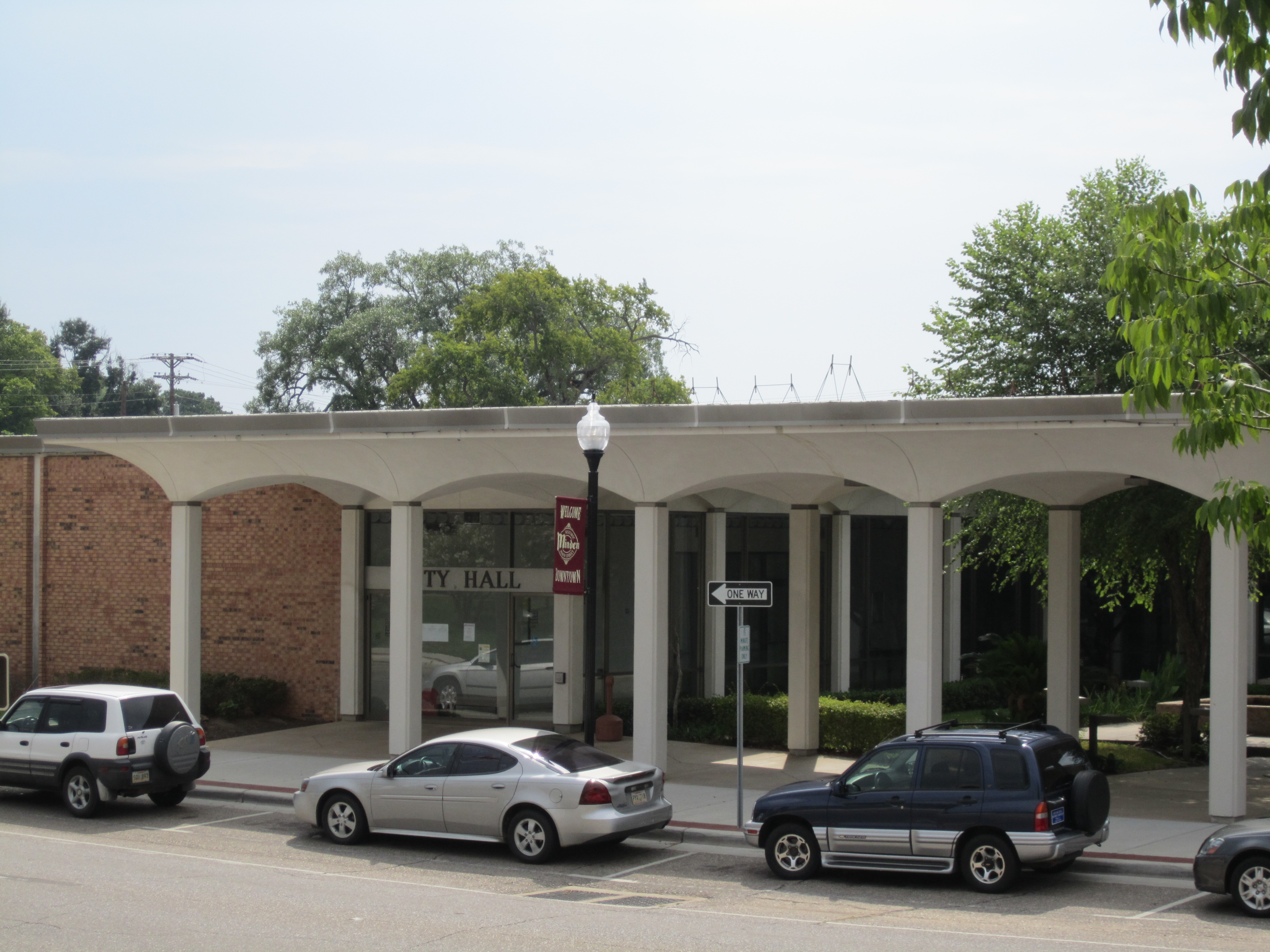
- Minden City Hall and Convention Center

- Location of Minden in Webster Parish, Louisiana.

- Location within Louisiana
- Coordinates: 32°37′0″N 93°16′00″W
- Country: United States
- States: Louisiana
- Parish: Webster
- Founded: 1836
- Founder: Charles Veeder
- Named for: Minden, New York

Area
  - Total: 15.21 sq mi (39.39 km^{2})
  - Land: 15.04 sq mi (38.95 km^{2})
  - Water: 0.17 sq mi (0.44 km^{2})
- Elevation: 269 ft (82 m)

Population (2020)
  - Total: 11,928
  - Density: 793.2/sq mi (306.27/km^{2})
- Time zone: UTC-6 (CST)
  - Summer (DST): UTC-5 (CDT)
- ZIP code: 71055
- Area code(s): 318
- FIPS code: 22-50885
- GNIS feature ID: 2404271
- Website: City of Minden

Minden is a small city in and the parish seat of Webster Parish, Louisiana, United States. It is located twenty-eight miles east of Shreveport. As of the 2020 census, the city had a total population of 11,928. The Main Street district of Minden is recognized as a Louisiana Main Street Community, a Louisiana Cultural Products District, and is sited on the National Register of Historic Places. Minden is the core and principal city of the Minden Micropolitan Statistical Area, consisting of all of Webster Parish, which is part of the Shreveport–Bossier City–Minden CSA.

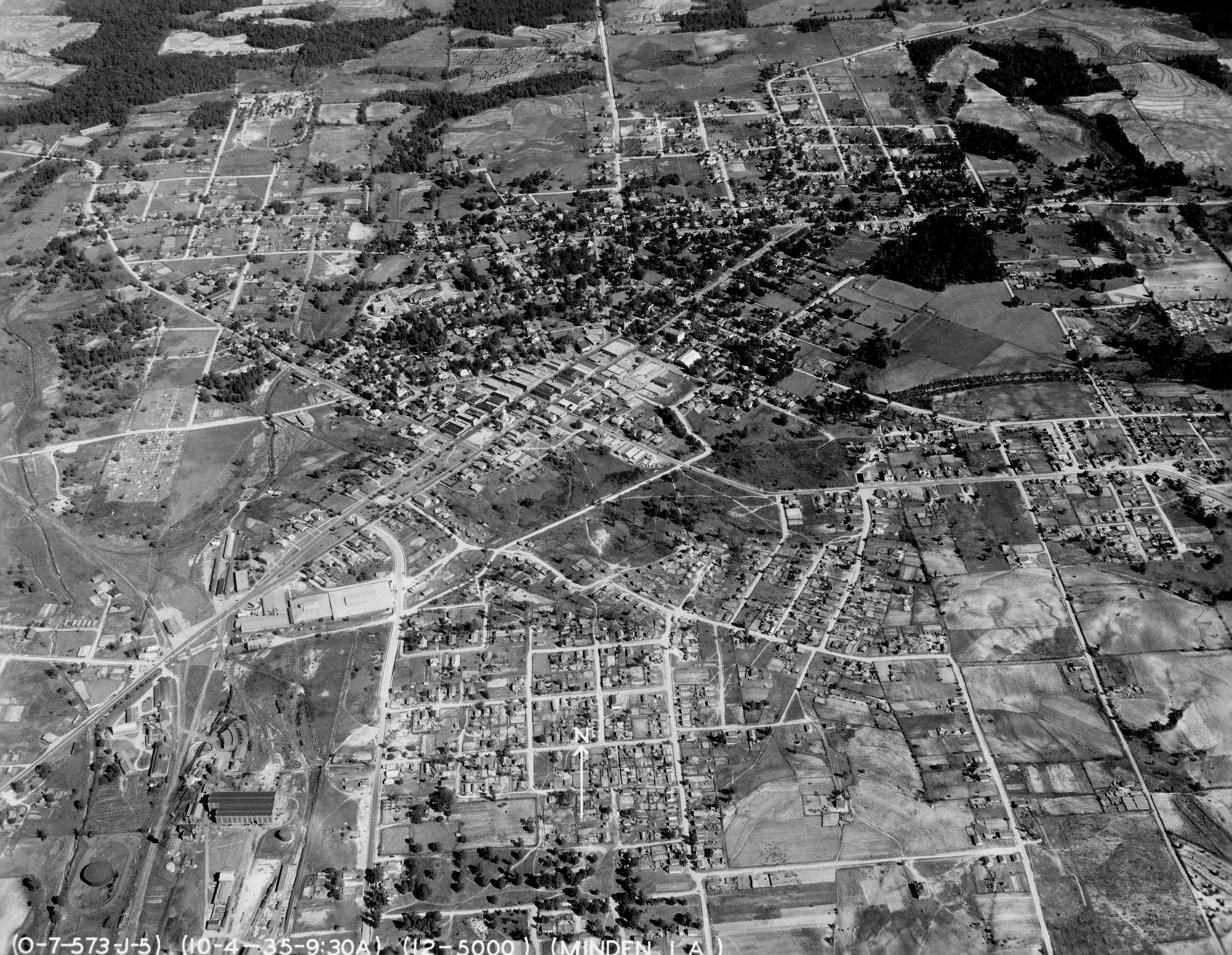
Aerial view of Minden, 1935

== History ==
Minden was established in 1836 by Charles Veeder.

The town's name is believed to be named for the town of Minden, New York, ultimately derived from the German city of Minden.

The city of Minden was used as a blueprint for the fictional city of Bon Temps, the setting of the Southern Vampire Mysteries series by Charlaine Harris.

During the Civil War, a large Confederate encampment was located inside of Minden. It housed about 15,000 Confederate soldiers. The town served as a supply depot for the Confederate Army. Close to thirty Confederate soldiers who died in the Battles of Mansfield and Pleasant Hill are buried in the Old Minden Cemetery.

In the Great Blizzard of 1899, Minden experienced the coldest temperature ever recorded in Louisiana, when the temperature fell on February 13, 1899, to −16 °F or −26.7 °C.

During the Great Depression, one of the two Minden banks failed and a fire destroyed a major section of the downtown area (1931).

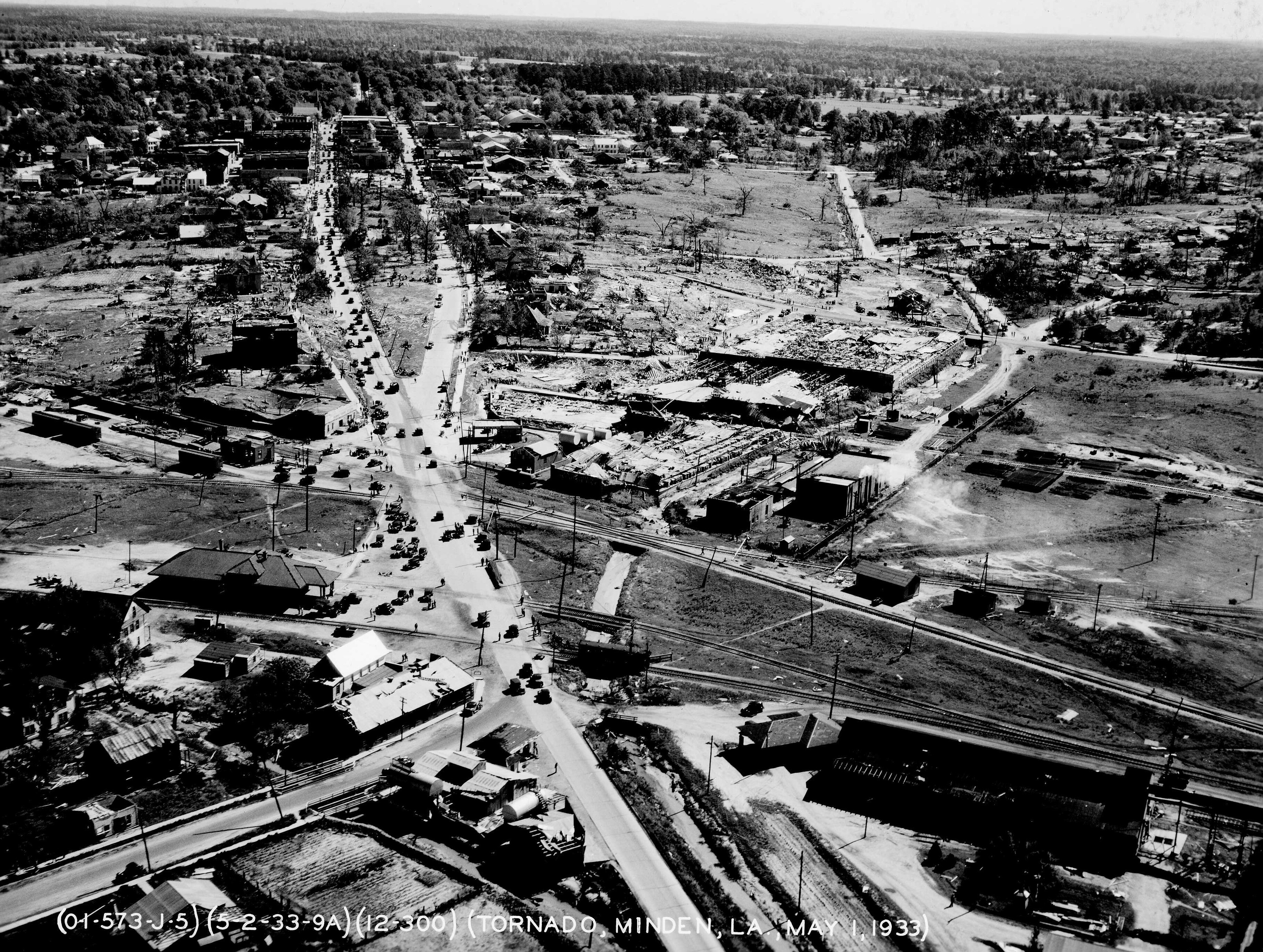
Aftermath of the 1933 tornado

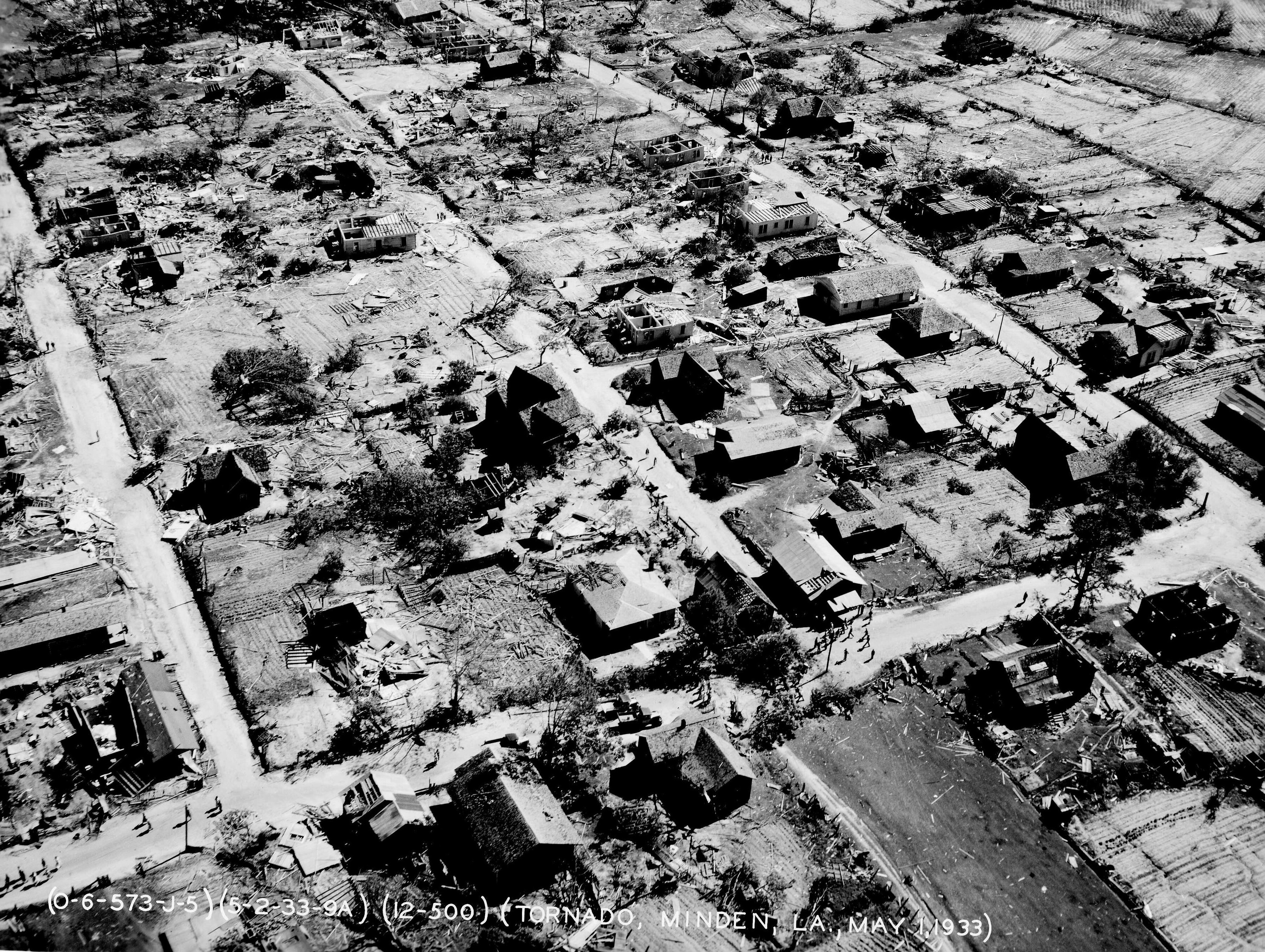
Aftermath of the 1933 tornado

On May 1, 1933, a tornado occurred in the town, destroying 20% of the homes.

== Geography ==
According to the United States Census Bureau, the city has a total area of 31.0 km² (12.0 mi²). 30.8 km^{2} (11.9 mi²) of it is land and 0.2 km^{2} (0.1 mi²) of it is water. The total area is 0.75% water.

=== Climate ===
Minden holds the records for both the highest and lowest temperature recorded in Louisiana in February, which is also the coldest temperature recorded in Louisiana in general. On February 13, 1899, the temperature dropped to -16 °F (-26.7 °C).

Climate data for Minden, Louisiana (1991–2020 normals, extremes 1893–2021)
Month	Jan	Feb	Mar	Apr	May	Jun	Jul	Aug	Sep	Oct	Nov	Dec	Year
Record high °F (°C)	85 (29)	92 (33)	92 (33)	95 (35)	99 (37)	106 (41)	111 (44)	112 (44)	110 (43)	100 (38)	94 (34)	88 (31)	112 (44)
Mean maximum °F (°C)	75.2 (24.0)	78.3 (25.7)	83.4 (28.6)	87.0 (30.6)	91.2 (32.9)	95.5 (35.3)	99.4 (37.4)	100.4 (38.0)	96.5 (35.8)	90.4 (32.4)	82.0 (27.8)	76.8 (24.9)	101.5 (38.6)
Mean daily maximum °F (°C)	57.9 (14.4)	61.9 (16.6)	69.9 (21.1)	77.4 (25.2)	84.3 (29.1)	90.9 (32.7)	94.2 (34.6)	94.7 (34.8)	89.3 (31.8)	79.2 (26.2)	68.1 (20.1)	59.8 (15.4)	77.3 (25.2)
Daily mean °F (°C)	46.0 (7.8)	49.5 (9.7)	57.1 (13.9)	64.5 (18.1)	73.0 (22.8)	80.3 (26.8)	83.5 (28.6)	83.3 (28.5)	77.3 (25.2)	66.0 (18.9)	55.4 (13.0)	48.1 (8.9)	65.3 (18.5)
Mean daily minimum °F (°C)	34.2 (1.2)	37.2 (2.9)	44.3 (6.8)	51.5 (10.8)	61.7 (16.5)	69.7 (20.9)	72.9 (22.7)	71.9 (22.2)	65.4 (18.6)	52.9 (11.6)	42.7 (5.9)	36.3 (2.4)	53.4 (11.9)
Mean minimum °F (°C)	19.5 (−6.9)	24.4 (−4.2)	28.0 (−2.2)	36.8 (2.7)	47.4 (8.6)	60.8 (16.0)	66.8 (19.3)	64.7 (18.2)	52.7 (11.5)	37.1 (2.8)	27.8 (−2.3)	22.8 (−5.1)	17.9 (−7.8)
Record low °F (°C)	0 (−18)	−16 (−27)	14 (−10)	25 (−4)	34 (1)	48 (9)	50 (10)	52 (11)	37 (3)	22 (−6)	12 (−11)	2 (−17)	−16 (−27)
Average precipitation inches (mm)	5.27 (134)	5.01 (127)	5.66 (144)	6.45 (164)	4.89 (124)	4.93 (125)	3.68 (93)	3.24 (82)	3.69 (94)	4.68 (119)	4.36 (111)	5.73 (146)	57.59 (1,463)
Average snowfall inches (cm)	0.1 (0.25)	0.3 (0.76)	0.0 (0.0)	0.0 (0.0)	0.0 (0.0)	0.0 (0.0)	0.0 (0.0)	0.0 (0.0)	0.0 (0.0)	0.0 (0.0)	0.0 (0.0)	0.0 (0.0)	0.4 (1.0)
Average precipitation days (≥ 0.01 in)	9.0	8.8	9.4	7.5	7.9	8.2	7.4	6.7	6.1	6.8	7.9	9.0	94.7
Average snowy days (≥ 0.1 in)	0.1	0.2	0.0	0.0	0.0	0.0	0.0	0.0	0.0	0.0	0.0	0.1	0.4
Source: NOAA

== Demographics ==
Historical population
Census	Pop.	Note	%±
1850	533		—
1860	1,144		114.6%
1870	1,100		−3.8%
1880	1,113		1.2%
1890	1,298		16.6%
1900	1,561		20.3%
1910	3,002		92.3%
1920	6,105		103.4%
1930	5,623		−7.9%
1940	6,677		18.7%
1950	9,787		46.6%
1960	12,785		30.6%
1970	13,996		9.5%
1980	15,084		7.8%
1990	13,661		−9.4%
2000	13,027		−4.6%
2010	13,082		0.4%
2020	11,928		−8.8%
2025 (est.)	11,103	▼	−6.9%
U.S. Decennial Census

=== Racial and ethnic composition ===
Minden city, Louisiana – Racial and ethnic composition Note: the US Census treats Hispanic/Latino as an ethnic category. This table excludes Latinos from the racial categories and assigns them to a separate category. Hispanics/Latinos may be of any race.
Race / Ethnicity (NH = Non-Hispanic)	Pop 2000	Pop 2010	Pop 2020	% 2000	% 2010	% 2020
White alone (NH)	6,014	5,939	4,966	46.17%	45.40%	41.63%
Black or African American alone (NH)	6,776	6,736	6,352	52.02%	51.49%	53.25%
Native American or Alaska Native alone (NH)	36	25	25	0.28%	0.19%	0.21%
Asian alone (NH)	35	42	60	0.27%	0.32%	0.50%
Native Hawaiian or Pacific Islander alone (NH)	5	1	7	0.04%	0.01%	0.06%
Other Race alone (NH)	2	11	23	0.02%	0.08%	0.19%
Mixed race or Multiracial (NH)	79	145	311	0.61%	1.11%	2.61%
Hispanic or Latino (any race)	80	183	184	0.61%	1.40%	1.54%
Total	13,027	13,082	11,928	100.00%	100.00%	100.00%

=== 2020 census ===
As of the 2020 census, Minden had a population of 11,928. The median age was 41.0 years. 23.4% of residents were under the age of 18 and 20.8% of residents were 65 years of age or older. For every 100 females there were 82.6 males, and for every 100 females age 18 and over there were 78.6 males age 18 and over.

91.8% of residents lived in urban areas, while 8.2% lived in rural areas.

There were 5,048 households in Minden, of which 29.4% had children under the age of 18 living in them. Of all households, 32.2% were married-couple households, 18.6% were households with a male householder and no spouse or partner present, and 44.1% were households with a female householder and no spouse or partner present. About 34.2% of all households were made up of individuals and 16.3% had someone living alone who was 65 years of age or older. There were 3,126 families.

There were 5,756 housing units, of which 12.3% were vacant. The homeowner vacancy rate was 1.7% and the rental vacancy rate was 9.6%.

== Government ==
City Administration	Administrators
Mayor	Nick Cox
Police Chief	Jared McIver
Attorney	Jimbo Yocom

== Media ==
=== Television ===
Minden is part of the Shreveport media market for television.

== Notable people ==
- Gene Austin, entertainer, singer and songwriter
- Louis Dunbar, basketball player and member of the Harlem Globetrotters
- Percy Mayfield, blues singer and songwriter
- L'Jarius Sneed, NFL cornerback for the Kansas City Chiefs
- J. D. Watkins, judge and politician
- Rita Days, Former MO State Senator and St. Louis,MO County Chair
