= List of state highways in Louisiana (500–549) =

The following is a list of state highways in the U.S. state of Louisiana designated in the 500-549 range.

== Louisiana Highway 500 ==
Louisiana Highway 500
- Location: Packton–Searcy
- Length: 24.59 mi (39.57 km)
- Existed: 1955–present

Louisiana Highway 500 (LA 500) runs 24.59 miles (39.57 km) in an east–west direction from US 167 at Packton, Grant Parish to US 84 west of Jena, LaSalle Parish.

LA 500 initially travels due east from US 167 along the Grant–Winn parish line. It then curves southeast through the Kisatchie National Forest and proceeds into the village of Georgetown. Here, the highway crosses the four-lane US 165 and zigzags north and east through the center of town. Heading southeast from Georgetown, LA 500 crosses the Little River in LaSalle Parish. The route continues through the tiny rural communities of Zenoria, Little Creek, and Searcy until reaching its eastern terminus at a T-intersection with US 84 west of Trout, an unincorporated community outside Jena. LA 500 is an undivided two-lane highway for its entire route.

Parish	Location	mi	km	Destinations	Notes
Grant	Packton	0.0	0.0	US 167 – Winnfield, Alexandria	Southern terminus
Grant	Zion	5.2	8.4	LA 472 west – Williana	Western end of LA 472 concurrency
Grant	Zion	5.6	9.0	LA 472 east	Eastern end of LA 472 concurrency
Grant	Georgetown	12.1	19.5	US 165 – Alexandria, Monroe	
Grant	Georgetown	12.4	20.0	LA 502	Northern terminus of LA 502
Grant	Georgetown	12.8	20.6	LA 1230	Eastern terminus of LA 1230
Grant	Georgetown	12.9	20.8	To US 165	Via frontage road
LaSalle	Searcy	24.6	39.6	US 84 – Jena, Tullos	Eastern terminus
1.000 mi = 1.609 km; 1.000 km = 0.621 mi: Concurrency terminus

== Louisiana Highway 501 ==
Louisiana Highway 501
- Location: Winnfield–Friendship
- Length: 30.75 mi (49.49 km)

Louisiana Highway 501 (LA 501) runs 30.75 miles (49.49 km) from Winnfield to Friendship.

== Louisiana Highway 502 ==
Louisiana Highway 502
- Location: Georgetown
- Length: 1.52 mi (2.45 km)
- Existed: 1955–present

Louisiana Highway 502 (LA 502) runs 1.52 miles (2.45 km) in a north–south direction from US 165 to LA 500 in Georgetown, Grant Parish.

The route heads due east from US 165 then turns northward after crossing the Union Pacific Railroad (UPRR) tracks. Now running parallel to US 165, LA 502 enters Georgetown and intersects LA 500. The north–south section of the route represents the original alignment of US 165 in the area. It is an undivided two-lane highway for its entire length.

The entire highway is in Grant Parish.

Location	mi	km	Destinations	Notes
	0.0	0.0	US 165 – Alexandria, Monroe	Southern terminus
Georgetown	1.5	2.4	LA 500	Northern terminus
1.000 mi = 1.609 km; 1.000 km = 0.621 mi

== Louisiana Highway 503 ==
Louisiana Highway 503
- Location: Summerville–Nickel
- Length: 8.75 mi (14.08 km)

Louisiana Highway 503 (LA 503) runs 8.75 miles (14.08 km) from Summerville to Nickel.

== Louisiana Highway 504 ==
Louisiana Highway 504
- Location: Natchitoches
- Length: 4.28 mi (6.89 km)

Louisiana Highway 504 (LA 504) runs 4.28 miles (6.89 km) in Natchitoches.

The entire route is in Natchitoches Parish.

Location	mi	km	Destinations	Notes
Natchitoches	0.0	0.0	LA 6 (University Parkway)	Southern terminus; traffic circle
Natchitoches	0.1	0.16	LA 3278 east	Western terminus of LA 3278
	4.3	6.9	LA 3191	Northern terminus
1.000 mi = 1.609 km; 1.000 km = 0.621 mi

== Louisiana Highway 505 ==
Louisiana Highway 505
- Location: Tannehill–Weston
- Length: 25.24 mi (40.62 km)
- Existed: 1955–present

Louisiana Highway 505 (LA 505) runs 25.24 miles (40.62 km) in a north–south direction from US 167 at Tannehill, Winn Parish to LA 4 in Weston, Jackson Parish.

The route is roughly L-shaped, initially heading northwest from US 167. It then curves to the northeast, passing between the towns of Jonesboro and Dodson as it crosses US 167 at Wyatt. LA 505 continues northeast to an intersection with LA 4 in Weston. It is an undivided two-lane highway for its entire length.

== Louisiana Highway 506 ==
Louisiana Highway 506
- Location: La Salle Parish–Caldwell Parish
- Length: 18.35 mi (29.53 km)

Louisiana Highway 506 runs in a general Northwest - Southeast direction from LA-124 in LaSalle Parish, to Hebron Rd in Caldwell Parish.

Beginning at its Southeastern terminus at LA-124, LA-506 runs 4.3 miles in a northern direction to the southern terminus of LA-849 east of Kelly. It then continues west for 3 miles, where it crosses U.S. Highway 165, then continues west approximately 10 miles. Its Northern terminus is at a point where State maintenance ends and the road becomes gravel.

Except for the 1 mile section between its intersection with LA-843 to its intersection with US-165, the entire route is scheduled for deletion as part of Louisiana's "Right Sizing" program.

== Louisiana Highway 507 ==
Louisiana Highway 507
- Location: Messick–Simsboro
- Length: 60.38 mi (97.17 km)

Louisiana Highway 507 (LA 507) runs 60.38 miles (97.17 km) from Messick to Simsboro.

== Louisiana Highway 508 ==
Louisiana Highway 508
- Location: Bienville
- Length: 6.81 mi (10.96 km)

Louisiana Highway 508 (LA 508) runs 6.81 miles (10.96 km) in Bienville.

== Louisiana Highway 509 ==
Louisiana Highway 509
- Location: Mansfield–Westdale
- Length: 16.40 mi (26.39 km)

Louisiana Highway 509 (LA 509) runs 16.40 miles (26.39 km) from Mansfield to Westdale.

Parish	Location	mi	km	Destinations	Notes
DeSoto	Mansfield	0.0	0.0	LA 175	
DeSoto		7.5	12.1	I-49 – Shreveport, Alexandria	I-49 exit 177
Red River		16.4	26.4	LA 1 – Shreveport, Coushatta	
1.000 mi = 1.609 km; 1.000 km = 0.621 mi

== Louisiana Highway 510 ==
Louisiana Highway 510
- Location: De Soto Parish
- Length: 9.46 mi (15.22 km)

Louisiana Highway 510 (LA 510) runs 9.46 miles (15.22 km) in De Soto Parish.

== Louisiana Highway 511 ==
Louisiana Highway 511
- Location: Greenwood–Bossier City
- Length: 17.92 mi (28.84 km)

Louisiana Highway 511 (LA 511) runs 17.92 miles (28.84 km) in an east–west direction from the concurrent US 79/US 80 in Greenwood to US 71 in Bossier City. In Shreveport, the highway is known locally as 70th Street, while in Bossier City it is known as Jimmie Davis Highway.

Parish	Location	mi	km	Destinations	Notes
Caddo	Greenwood	0.0	0.0	US 79 / US 80 to I-20	Western terminus
Caddo	Shreveport	3.0	4.8	LA 526 (Bert Kouns Industrial Loop)	
Caddo	Shreveport	6.4– 6.5	10.3– 10.5	LA 3132	Exit 1D on LA 3132
Caddo	Shreveport	10.6	17.1	US 171 (Mansfield Road)	
Caddo	Shreveport	12.0– 12.1	19.3– 19.5	I-49 – Shreveport, Alexandria	Exit 202 on I-49
Caddo	Shreveport	12.6	20.3	LA 523 south (Line Avenue)	Northwestern terminus of LA 523
Caddo	Shreveport	14.2	22.9	LA 1 (Youree Drive)	
Caddo	Shreveport	15.3	24.6	LA 526 west (East Bert Kouns Industrial Loop)	Eastern terminus of LA 526
Caddo	Shreveport			Clyde Fant Parkway	Interchange
Caddo–Bossier parish line		16.7– 17.2	26.9– 27.7	Bridge over Red River	
Bossier	Bossier City			A. R. Teague Parkway	Interchange
Bossier	Bossier City	17.9	28.8	US 71 (Barksdale Boulevard)	Eastern terminus
1.000 mi = 1.609 km; 1.000 km = 0.621 mi

== Louisiana Highway 512 ==
Louisiana Highway 512
- Location: Benson–Pelican
- Length: 6.01 mi (9.67 km)

Louisiana Highway 512 (LA 512) runs 6.01 miles (9.67 km) from Benson to Pelican.

== Louisiana Highway 513 ==
Louisiana Highway 513
- Location: Pelican–Mansfield
- Length: 14.86 mi (23.91 km)

Louisiana Highway 513 (LA 513) runs 14.86 miles (23.91 km) from Pelican to Mansfield.

== Louisiana Highway 514 ==
Louisiana Highway 514
- Location: East Point–Womack
- Length: 12.19 mi (19.62 km)

Louisiana Highway 514 (LA 514) runs 12.19 miles (19.62 km) from East Point to Womack.

== Louisiana Highway 515 ==
Louisiana Highway 515
- Location: Red River Parish–Bossier Parish
- Length: 11.72 mi (18.86 km)

Louisiana Highway 515 (LA 515) runs 11.72 miles (18.86 km) from Red River Parish to Bossier Parish.

== Louisiana Highway 516 ==
Louisiana Highway 516
- Location: Ringgold–Bryceland
- Length: 20.41 mi (32.85 km)

Louisiana Highway 516 (LA 516) runs 20.41 miles (32.85 km) from Ringgold to Bryceland.

== Louisiana Highway 517 ==
Louisiana Highway 517
- Location: Mount Lebanon–Bryceland
- Length: 6.03 mi (9.70 km)

Louisiana Highway 517 (LA 517) runs 6.03 miles (9.70 km) from Mount Lebanon to Bryceland.

== Louisiana Highway 518 ==
Louisiana Highway 518
- Location: Minden–Lisbon
- Length: 29.67 mi (47.75 km)

Louisiana Highway 518 (LA 518) runs 29.67 miles (47.75 km) from Minden to Lisbon.

== Louisiana Highway 519 ==
Louisiana Highway 519
- Location: Arcadia–Marsalis
- Length: 9.00 mi (14.48 km)

Louisiana Highway 519 (LA 519) runs 9.00 miles (14.48 km) from Arcadia to Marsalis.

== Louisiana Highway 520 ==
Louisiana Highway 520
- Location: Claiborne Parish
- Length: 16.18 mi (26.04 km)
- Existed: 1955–present

Louisiana Highway 520 (LA 520) runs 16.18 miles (26.04 km) in a north–south direction from US 79 in Homer to LA 161 northeast of Gordon, Claiborne Parish.

The route heads in a general northeast direction from an intersection with US 79 at the northern tip of Homer. It makes a brief jog eastward onto LA 2 Alternate at Colquitt before turning north toward LA 161 just south of the Arkansas state line. It is an undivided two-lane highway for its entire length.

The entire highway is in Claiborne Parish.

Location	mi	km	Destinations	Notes
Homer	0.0	0.0	US 79 – Homer, Haynesville	Southern terminus
	11.3	18.2	LA 2 Alt. west – Haynesville	South end of LA 2 Alternate concurrency
Colquitt	12.0	19.3	LA 2 Alt. east – Summerfield	North end of LA 2 Alternate concurrency
	16.2	26.1	LA 161 – Haynesville, El Dorado	Northern terminus
1.000 mi = 1.609 km; 1.000 km = 0.621 mi: Concurrency terminus

== Louisiana Highway 521 ==
Louisiana Highway 521
- Location: Leton–Millerton
- Length: 10.43 mi (16.79 km)

Louisiana Highway 521 (LA 521) runs 10.43 miles (16.79 km) from Leton to Millerton.

== Louisiana Highway 522 ==
Louisiana Highway 522
- Location: Mansfield
- Length: 3.80 mi (6.12 km)

Louisiana Highway 522 (LA 522) runs 3.80 miles (6.12 km) in Mansfield.

== Louisiana Highway 523 ==
Louisiana Highway 523
- Location: Shreveport
- Length: 5.88 mi (9.46 km)
- Existed: 1955–present

Louisiana Highway 523 (LA 523) runs 5.88 miles (9.46 km) in a southeast to northwest direction from LA 1 to LA 511 in Shreveport, Caddo Parish.

The route heads west from LA 1 at Lucas, a point within the southeast corner of Shreveport. After intersecting LA 3132 (Inner Loop Expressway), LA 523 curves to the southwest then turns northwest. The highway follows Ellerbe Road across LA 516 (East Bert Kouns Industrial Loop) to a second interchange with LA 3132 just east of I-49. LA 523 proceeds northward onto Line Avenue to its terminus at LA 511 in an area of Shreveport known as Cedar Grove.

The entire route is in Shreveport, Caddo Parish.

mi	km	Destinations	Notes
0.0	0.0	LA 1 (Youree Drive)	
1.2	1.9	LA 3132 west to I-49	
2.8	4.5	LA 526	Interchange
3.8	6.1	LA 3132 to I-49	LA 3132 exit 8
5.9	9.5	LA 511 (East 70th Street)	
1.000 mi = 1.609 km; 1.000 km = 0.621 mi

== Louisiana Highway 524 ==
Louisiana Highway 524
- Location: Grant Parish
- Length: 9.88 mi (15.90 km)
- Existed: 1955–present

Louisiana Highway 524 (LA 524) runs 9.88 miles (15.90 km) in a north–south direction from US 165 north of Pollock to the end of state maintenance at a point just north of LA 123 in Breezy Hill, Grant Parish.

The route parallels US 165 through the community of Antonia. It then makes a brief jog onto US 165 before crossing to the west side of the highway and continuing toward Breezy Hill, where it continues as a local road. LA 524 represents the original alignment of US 165 through the area. It is an undivided two-lane highway for its entire length.

The entire highway is in Grant Parish.

Location	mi	km	Destinations	Notes
	0.0	0.0	US 165 – Alexandria, Monroe	Southern terminus
	5.0	8.0	US 165 south – Alexandria	South end of US 165 concurrency
	5.5	8.9	US 165 north – Monroe	North end of US 165 concurrency
Breezy Hill	9.5	15.3	LA 123 – Dry Prong	
Breezy Hill	9.9	15.9	End state maintenance 0.4 miles (0.64 km) north of LA 123	Northern terminus; road continues north as Old US 165, a local road
1.000 mi = 1.609 km; 1.000 km = 0.621 mi: Concurrency terminus

== Louisiana Highway 525 ==
Louisiana Highway 525
- Location: Spring Ridge–Shreveport
- Length: 10.05 mi (16.17 km)

Louisiana Highway 525 (LA 525) runs 10.05 miles (16.17 km) from Spring Ridge to Shreveport.

== Louisiana Highway 526 ==
Louisiana Highway 526
- Location: Shreveport
- Length: 15.99 mi (25.73 km)

Louisiana Highway 526 (LA 526), also known as the Bert Kouns Industrial Loop, provides a southern bypass around Shreveport, connecting with LA 1 and US 71 eastbound, and US 171 and I-20 westbound. It intersects I-49 seven miles south of I-20.

LA 526 begins at an intersection with US 79 / US 80 in the Flournoy neighborhood of western Shreveport. The highway travels south and almost immediately crosses I-20 then LA 511 (70th Street). LA 526 then travels through a large industrial park on the city's western edge, passing near Union Pacific's Reisor Yard. The highway continues to travel south before turning southeast at Woodworth Road, traveling through less developed areas of Shreveport. LA 526 then turns east near Pines Road, with the highway passing by several residential areas, before the route becomes more commercial at US 171 (Mansfield Road). Continuing past US 171, the route of LA 526 features a mix of residential and commercial areas until meeting I-49, with the route traveling through less developed areas of the city east of the Interstate. The highway then turns northeast near St. Vincent Avenue / Wallace Lake Road. LA 526 then crosses LA 3132 (Inner Loop Expressway), with the highway's route transitioning back to a mix of commercial and residential use, intersecting LA 1 (Youree Drive), then ends at an intersection with LA 511 (70th Street) near Shreve Island.

The entire route is in Shreveport, Caddo Parish.

mi	km	Destinations	Notes
0.0	0.0	I-20 / US 79 / US 80 – Dallas, Shreveport	Western terminus; I-20 exit 8
0.5	0.80	LA 511 (70th Street)	
8.1	13.0	US 171 (Mansfield Road)	
11.1	17.9	I-49 – Shreveport, Alexandria	I-49 exit 199
12.4	20.0	LA 523	Interchange
13.1	21.1	LA 3132 to I-49	LA 3132 exit 9
14.8	23.8	LA 1 (Youree Drive) – Natchitoches, LSU Shreveport	
16.0	25.7	LA 511 (70th Street) – Bossier City	Eastern terminus
1.000 mi = 1.609 km; 1.000 km = 0.621 mi

== Louisiana Highway 527 ==
Louisiana Highway 527
- Location: Taylortown–Lake Bistineau
- Length: 13.55 mi (21.81 km)
- Existed: 1955–present

Louisiana Highway 527 (LA 527) runs 13.55 miles (21.81 km) in an east–west direction from US 71 at Taylortown, Bossier Parish to LA 163 south of Lake Bistineau State Park in Webster Parish.

== Louisiana Highway 528 ==
Louisiana Highway 528
- Location: Bossier Parish–Dixie Inn
- Length: 11.20 mi (18.02 km)

Louisiana Highway 528 (LA 528) runs 11.20 miles (18.02 km) from Bossier Parish to Dixie Inn.

== Louisiana Highway 529 ==
Louisiana Highway 529
- Location: Ivan
- Length: 6.74 mi (10.85 km)

Louisiana Highway 529 (LA 529) runs 6.74 miles (10.85 km) in Ivan.

== Louisiana Highway 530 ==
Louisiana Highway 530
- Location: Oil City–Belcher
- Length: 10.23 mi (16.46 km)

Louisiana Highway 530 (LA 530) runs 10.23 miles (16.46 km) from Oil City to Belcher.

== Louisiana Highway 531 ==
Louisiana Highway 531
- Location: Heflin–Minden
- Length: 14.45 mi (23.26 km)

Louisiana Highway 531 (LA 531) runs 14.45 miles (23.26 km) from Heflin to Minden.

== Louisiana Highway 532 ==
Louisiana Highway 532
- Location: Dubberly–Nine Forks
- Length: 5.15 mi (8.29 km)

Louisiana Highway 532 (LA 532) runs 5.15 miles (8.29 km) from Dubberly to Nine Forks.

== Louisiana Highway 533 ==
Louisiana Highway 533
- Location: Claiborne Parish
- Length: 7.44 mi (11.97 km)

Louisiana Highway 533 (LA 533) runs 7.44 miles (11.97 km) in Claiborne.

== Louisiana Highway 534 ==
Louisiana Highway 534
- Location: Kisatchie National Forest–Haynesville
- Length: 20.40 mi (32.83 km)

Louisiana Highway 534 (LA 534) runs 20.40 miles (32.83 km) from the Kisatchie National Forest to Haynesville.

== Louisiana Highway 537 ==
Louisiana Highway 537
- Location: Plain Dealing
- Length: 11.82 mi (19.02 km)

Louisiana Highway 537 (LA 537) runs 11.82 miles (19.02 km) in Plain Dealing.

== Louisiana Highway 538 ==
Louisiana Highway 538
- Location: Shreveport–Caddo
- Length: 23.41 mi (37.67 km)

Louisiana Highway 538 (LA 538) runs 23.41 miles (37.67 km) in a north–south direction from LA 3049 in Shreveport to LA 1 north of Oil City, Caddo Parish.

The route begins at an intersection with LA 3049 in Shreveport, just south of I-220. LA 3049 continues the route south on Grimmett Drive and makes a right to the north on Dixie Shreveport Road. From this intersection, LA 538 heads north on Old Mooringsport Road, retaining this name until halfway through Mooringsport. It crosses under I-220, and shortly after, it has an intersection with Ravendale Drive at a traffic circle. LA 538 continues north for 2.8 miles (4.5 km) before making a brief jog onto US 71. After crossing out of the Shreveport city limits, LA 538 begins a northwest course for 2.5 mi (4.0 km), crossing a bridge over I-49 before curving to the southwest and intersecting with LA 1, where it turns northwest and then to the west, before curving back to the northwest shortly after passing a high school. LA 538 continues northwest for 2.7 mi (4.3 km) before intersecting LA 173. LA 173 heads north to a point known as Dixie, also intersecting LA 1. Shortly, after, LA 538 curves to the north-northwest, crossing under the Kansas City Southern Railway tracks. After 4.1 mi (6.6 km), LA 538 enters the town of Mooringsport, and shortly after it intersects with LA 169, which heads northeast to just northwest of Dixie. From here, LA 538 curves to the west and then to the north, where Old Mooringsport Road ends and LA 538 gains the local name of Latimer Street. Shortly after, LA 538 curves to the northeast and then to the north as it crosses a bridge over Caddo Lake. LA 538 parallels the Caddo Lake Historic Drawbridge while on this bridge. LA 538 also begins to parallel the Kansas City Southern Railway tracks before splitting from the railway as the highway curves to the northeast and then to the northwest, before intersecting with LA 1 a second time. After 1.3 mi (2.0 km), LA 538 enters the town of Oil City, gaining the local name of Kerley Avenue. Shortly after entering town, LA 538 intersects LA 530 (Allen Street). LA 538 and LA 530 begin a concurrency for 1.1 mi (1.8 km) until LA 530 splits off to the east toward the village of Belcher. LA 538 continues north for a final 2.2 mi (3.5 km) before reaching its northern terminus at a third intersection with LA 1, just north of Oil City. LA 538 is an undivided two-lane highway except for the traffic circle at Ravendale Drive.

The entire highway is in Caddo Parish.

Location	mi	km	Destinations	Notes
Shreveport	0.0	0.0	LA 3049 (Grimmett Drive, Dixie-Shreveport Road)	Southern terminus
	3.3	5.3	US 71 south	Southern end of US 71 concurrency
	3.4	5.5	US 71 north	Northern end of US 71 concurrency
	5.9	9.5	LA 1 (North Market Street) – Shreveport, Vivian	
Blanchard	9.3	15.0	LA 173 (Dixie-Blanchard Road) – Blanchard, Dixie	
Mooringsport	15.7	25.3	LA 169 north (Dixie-Mooringsport Road)	Southern end of LA 169 concurrency
Mooringsport	15.8	25.4	LA 169 south (Jennings Street)	Northern end of LA 169 concurrency
Mooringsport	16.1	25.9	LA 767 south (Lake Street)	
	18.1	29.1	LA 1	
Oil City	20.3	32.7	LA 530 west (Allen Street)	Southern end of LA 530 concurrency
Oil City	21.3	34.3	LA 530 east (Belcher-Oil City Road) – Belcher	Northern end of LA 530 concurrency
	23.4	37.7	LA 1	Northern terminus
1.000 mi = 1.609 km; 1.000 km = 0.621 mi: Concurrency terminus

== Louisiana Highway 540 ==
Louisiana Highway 540
- Location: Ruple–Homer
- Length: 8.19 mi (13.18 km)

Louisiana Highway 540 (LA 540) runs 8.19 miles (13.18 km) from Ruple to Homer.

== Louisiana Highway 541 ==
Louisiana Highway 541
- Location: Avondale–Harvey
- Length: 9.72 mi (15.64 km)
- Existed: 1955–present

Louisiana Highway 541 (LA 541) runs 9.72 miles (15.64 km) in a general east–west direction from LA 18 in Avondale to a second junction with LA 18 in Harvey, Jefferson Parish.

The route heads north on River Road from LA 18 through the community of Bridge City, where it begins to parallel the west bank levee of the Mississippi River. After crossing underneath the Huey P. Long Bridge on US 90, LA 541 follows a sharp bend in the river known as Nine Mile Point. Now heading south, the highway enters the city of Westwego and has a brief concurrency with LA 18. Its local name briefly changes to Labauve Drive within the city limits. Continuing eastward along the river, LA 541 crosses into Marrero and intersects LA 560-2 (Barataria Boulevard), a short connector to LA 18 and LA 45. After crossing from Marrero into another unincorporated community known as Harvey, LA 541 curves south onto Destrehan Avenue alongside the Harvey Canal, a link in the Gulf Intracoastal Waterway. The route ends shortly afterward at LA 18 (4th Street) adjacent to a bascule bridge spanning the canal on that highway. LA 541 is an undivided two-lane highway for its entire length.

The entire highway is in Jefferson Parish.

Location	mi	km	Destinations	Notes
Avondale–Bridge City line	0.0	0.0	LA 18 (River Road)	Western terminus
Westwego	5.1	8.2	LA 18 west (Seven Oaks Boulevard)	West end of LA 18 concurrency
Westwego	5.6	9.0	LA 18 east (Louisiana Street)	East end of LA 18 concurrency
Marrero	8.5	13.7	LA 560-2 (Barataria Boulevard)	Northern terminus of LA 560-2
Harvey	9.7	15.6	LA 18 (4th Street)	Eastern terminus
1.000 mi = 1.609 km; 1.000 km = 0.621 mi: Concurrency terminus

== Louisiana Highway 542 ==
Louisiana Highway 542
- Location: Jonesboro
- Length: 8.30 mi (13.36 km)

Louisiana Highway 542 (LA 542) runs 8.30 miles (13.36 km) in Jonesboro.

== Louisiana Highway 543 ==
Louisiana Highway 543
- Location: Rogers–Vaughn
- Length: 4.42 mi (7.11 km)

Louisiana Highway 543 (LA 543) runs 4.42 miles (7.11 km) from Rogers to Vaughn.

== Louisiana Highway 544 ==
Louisiana Highway 544
- Location: Western Lincoln Parish–Ruston
- Length: 15.39 mi (24.77 km)

Louisiana Highway 544 (LA 544) runs 15.39 miles (24.77 km) from Lincoln Parish to Ruston.

== Louisiana Highway 545 ==
Louisiana Highway 545
- Location: Lincoln Parish
- Length: 17.60 mi (28.32 km)

Louisiana Highway 545 (LA 545) runs 17.60 miles (28.32 km) in Lincoln Parish.

== Louisiana Highway 546 ==
Louisiana Highway 546
- Location: Ouachita Parish
- Length: 10.75 mi (17.30 km)
- Existed: 1955–present

Louisiana Highway 546 (LA 546) runs 10.75 miles (17.30 km) in a southwest to northeast direction from LA 34 northeast of Eros to a junction with US 80 and LA 15 west of Monroe, Ouachita Parish.

The route heads northeast from LA 34 and intersects LA 151 at Cadeville where it passes West Ouachita High School. Near the end of its route, LA 546 crosses the Kansas City Southern Railway (KCSRW) tracks via an overpass and travels through an interchange with I-20 in Cheniere. It ends a short distance later at an intersection with US 80 and southbound LA 15, connecting to West Monroe. Northbound LA 15 continues straight ahead toward Farmerville. LA 546 is an undivided two-lane highway for its entire length.

The entire highway is in Ouachita Parish.

Location	mi	km	Destinations	Notes
	0.0	0.0	LA 34 – Eros, West Monroe	Southern terminus
Cadeville	2.0	3.2	LA 151 – Calhoun	Southern terminus of LA 151
	5.5	8.9	LA 838 (New Natchitoches Road) – Cheniere Lake, West Monroe	Western terminus of LA 838
Cheniere	10.0– 10.3	16.1– 16.6	I-20 – Monroe, Shreveport	Exit 108 on I-20
Cheniere	10.7	17.2	US 80 / LA 15 south (Cypress Street) – West Monroe, Ruston LA 15 north – Farmerville	Northern terminus
1.000 mi = 1.609 km; 1.000 km = 0.621 mi

== Louisiana Highway 547 ==
Louisiana Highway 547
- Location: Clarks
- Length: 3.06 mi (4.92 km)

Louisiana Highway 547 runs 3.06 miles in an east–west direction from a local road to its Western terminus at LA-845 in Clarks.

The entire route is in Caldwell Parish.

As part of Louisiana DOTD's "right-sizing" program, the entire route is set to be deleted and transferred to local control.

== Louisiana Highway 548 ==
Louisiana Highway 548
- Location: Chatham
- Length: 7.79 mi (12.54 km)

Louisiana Highway 548 (LA 548) runs 7.79 miles (12.54 km) in Chatham.

== Louisiana Highway 549 ==
Louisiana Highway 549
- Location: Union Parish
- Length: 15.54 mi (25.01 km)
- Existed: 1955–present

Louisiana Highway 549 (LA 549) runs 15.54 miles (25.01 km) in a north–south direction from LA 15 north of Farmerville to the Arkansas state line north of Oakland, Union Parish.

The route heads north from LA 15 and intersects LA 348 at Conway. LA 549 then passes the Union Wildlife Management Area and curves to the northeast at Truxno. Shortly before crossing the Arkansas state line, LA 549 intersects LA 551 in Oakland. The road continues toward Strong, Arkansas and US 82 as Arkansas Highway 275. It is an undivided two-lane highway for its entire length.

The entire highway is in Union Parish.

Location	mi	km	Destinations	Notes
Farmerville	0.0	0.0	LA 15 – Farmerville, Spearsville	Southern terminus
Conway	5.1	8.2	LA 348 – Marion	Western terminus of LA 348
Oakland	14.5	23.3	LA 551 – Marion	Northern terminus of LA 551
	15.6	25.1	AR 275 north (Oakland Road) – Strong	Northern terminus; continuation in Arkansas
1.000 mi = 1.609 km; 1.000 km = 0.621 mi
