= Interstate 69 in Louisiana =

Highway in Louisiana

Future Interstate 69
- Future I-69 highlighted in pink

Route information
- Maintained by Louisiana DOTD
- Length: 100 mi (160 km)
- Status: In design; environmental studies complete (Segments 14 and 15). Pending start of Tier II environmental study (Segment 16).

Major junctions
- South end: I-69 / US 84 at Texas state line
- US 171 south of Stonewall; I-49 east of Stonewall; LA 3132 in Shreveport; LA 1 southeast of Shreveport; US 71 in Taylortown; I-20 east of Fillmore; US 371 in Webster Parish
- North end: I-69 at Arkansas state line

Location
- Country: United States
- State: Louisiana

Highway system
- Interstate Highway System; Main; Auxiliary; Suffixed; Business; Future; Louisiana State Highway System; Interstate; US; State; Scenic
← LA 68	→ LA 69

Interstate 69 (I-69) is a proposed Interstate Highway that will pass through the northwestern part of the US state of Louisiana.

== Route description ==
In Louisiana, I-69 would head from the Texas state line near Logansport in a northeasterly direction to intersect I-49 near Stonewall in DeSoto Parish, north of Mansfield. It will then head north to the east of Shreveport to skirt along the southern and eastern edges of Barksdale Air Force Base. It will then intersect I-20 near Haughton in Bossier Parish and then turn northeast and pass Minden, Haynesville, and Shongaloo. Among officials working for this route was Mayor Dennis Freeman of Logansport in DeSoto Parish, who served from 1984 until his death in 2007.

== Sections ==
I-69 has been divided into a number of sections of independent utility (SIUs).

=== SIU 14 ===
From I-20 near Haughton, Louisiana, I-69 will probably be built on a new alignment toward Haynesville. From Haynesville, the freeway will enter Arkansas and run northeast to U.S. Highway 82 (US 82) west of El Dorado.

=== SIU 15 ===
SIU 15 continues around the south and east sides of the Shreveport area, crossing I-49 and ending at I-20 near Haughton. The project would provide a divided, four-lane, limited-access highway on new location between US 171 near the town of Stonewall in DeSoto Parish, and I-20 near the town of Haughton in Bossier Parish, a distance of approximately 35 miles (56 km). The project study area encompasses portions of Bossier, Caddo, and DeSoto parishes. Louisiana Highway 3132 is planned to be extended to I-69 between I-49 and LA 1. A frontage road between I-49 and LA 1 is also planned to be built. In October 2024, funding for the frontage road was identified and is potentially slated to start construction by late 2025.

=== SIU 16 ===
As well as covering the part in Texas northeast of Nacogdoches, SIU 16 also extends into Louisiana, ending at US 171 south of Stonewall. Texas is leading the environmental studies on segment 16, with support from Louisiana for the portion within that state. Originally envisioned to be incorporated into the Trans-Texas Corridors (TTC), the tier-one environmental impact statement (EIS) was approved, and a Record of Decision was issued in 2010, favoring the "No-Build" option that abandoned the TTC concept in lieu of upgrading existing U.S. and state highways in the corridor. As a result of the tier-one "No-Build" Record of Decision issued for the TTC concept, a new environmental study will be required for segment 16, which has not been started.

== Exit list ==
Parish	Location	mi	km	Exit	Destinations	Notes
Sabine River		0.00	0.00		I-69 south / US 84 west – Waco, Lufkin, Houston	Continuation into Texas
DeSoto	Stonewall				US 171	
Caddo	Shreveport				I-49 – Alexandria, Shreveport	I-49 exit 193
Caddo	Shreveport				LA 3132	
Caddo	Shreveport				LA 1	
Caddo	Taylortown				US 71	
Bossier					LA 157	
Bossier					I-20	I-20 exit 35
Webster					US 371	
Webster					LA 159	
Claiborne					LA 2	
Claiborne					LA 2	
Claiborne					US 79	
Claiborne		100	160		I-69 north	Continuation into Arkansas
1.000 mi = 1.609 km; 1.000 km = 0.621 mi: Unopened

== See also ==
Interstate 69
Previous state: Texas	Louisiana	Next state: Arkansas
