= List of exits on Interstate 20 =

The Interstate 20 exit list has been divided by state:

- Interstate 20 in Texas#Exit list
- Interstate 20 in Louisiana#Exit list
- Interstate 20 in Mississippi#Exit list
- Interstate 20 in Alabama#Exit list
- Interstate 20 in Georgia#Exit list
- Interstate 20 in South Carolina#Exit list
