= Interstate 20 in Louisiana =

Highway in Louisiana

Interstate 20
- I-20 highlighted in red

Route information
- Maintained by Louisiana DOTD
- Length: 189.844 mi (Note: For the federal government's purposes, the Federal Highway Administration lists Louisiana's portion of I-20 as 189.87 miles (305.57 km) in length.) (305.524 km)
- Existed: 1960–present
- NHS: Entire route

Major junctions
- West end: I-20 at Texas state line west of Greenwood, LA
- US 79 in Greenwood; I-220 / LA 3132 in Shreveport; I-49 / Pete Harris Drive in Shreveport; US 71 from Shreveport to Bossier City; I-220 / LA 1267 in Bossier City; Future I-69 near Haughton; US 63 / US 167 / LA 146 in Ruston; US 165 in Monroe; US 425 in Rayville; US 65 in Tallulah
- East end: I-20 / US 80 at Mississippi state line west of Vicksburg, MS

Location
- Country: United States
- State: Louisiana
- Parishes: Caddo, Bossier, Webster, Bienville, Lincoln, Ouachita, Richland, Madison

Highway system
- Interstate Highway System; Main; Auxiliary; Suffixed; Business; Future; Louisiana State Highway System; Interstate; US; State; Scenic
← LA 19	→ LA 20

Interstate 20 (I-20) is a part of the Interstate Highway System that spans 1,539.38 miles (2,477.39 km) from Reeves County, Texas, to Florence, South Carolina. Within the state of Louisiana, the highway travels 189.84 miles (305.52 km) from the Texas state line west of Greenwood to the Mississippi River, which it crosses into Vicksburg, Mississippi.

I-20 traverses the northern portion of the state, serving the metropolitan areas of Shreveport–Bossier City and Monroe, as well as the smaller cities of Minden and Ruston. It entirely parallels the older U.S. Highway 80 (US 80) corridor through Louisiana. The route is mirrored by I-10, which traverses the southern portion of the state. The two are connected by I-49, the state's major north–south Interstate Highway.

== Route description ==
I-20 enters Louisiana about 20 miles (32 km) east of Marshall, Texas, near Waskom. I-20 passes through Greenwood to the north of town, where US 80/US 79 serve as the main east–west highway. I-20 enters Shreveport about 5 miles (8.0 km) east of Greenwood. I-20 intersects I-220 (the north Shreveport bypass) and Louisiana Highway 3132 (LA 3132, the south Shreveport bypass) on the westside of the city. On the way to Downtown Shreveport, I-20 intersects US 171 and serves as the current northern terminus of I-49.

As I-20 leaves Shreveport, it passes through Bossier City where it shares an overlap with US 71. I-20 passes north of Barksdale AFB where it intersects I-220 with no access to the northern terminus of LA 1267 and heads east toward Monroe. On its way to Monroe, I-20 traverses mainly rural, hilly terrain as it passes through the towns of; Minden, Arcadia, Grambling, Ruston (where it intersects US 167), and West Monroe.

I-20 passes through Monroe, where it intersects US 165. East of Monroe, I-20 enters flatter terrain as it passes through Rayville, Delhi, and Tallulah. About 15 miles (24 km) east of Tallulah, I-20 crosses over the Mississippi River into Vicksburg, Mississippi.

== Exit list ==
Parish	Location	mi	km	Exit	Destinations	Notes
Louisiana–Texas line		0.000	0.000		I-20 west – Dallas	Continuation into Texas
Louisiana–Texas line		0.039	0.063	Texas Travel Information Center (westbound only)		
Caddo	Greenwood	2.292– 2.928	3.689– 4.712	Greenwood Rest Area & Visitor Center (eastbound only)		
Caddo	Greenwood	3.592– 4.085	5.781– 6.574	3	US 79 south – Carthage, Texas; LA 169 – Mooringsport	
Caddo	Greenwood	5.368– 5.894	8.639– 9.485	5	US 79 north / US 80 – Greenwood	
Caddo	Shreveport	8.370– 8.886	13.470– 14.301	8	US 80 LA 526 east (Industrial Loop)	Location also known as Flournoy; US 80 signed westbound only
Caddo	Shreveport	10.272– 10.959	16.531– 17.637	10	Pines Road	To Louisiana Baptist University
Caddo	Shreveport	11.349– 12.295	18.264– 19.787	11	I-220 east (By-Pass) / LA 3132 east (Inner Loop Expressway) to I-49 – Texarkana, Alexandria	Western termini and exits 1B-C on I-220 and LA 3132; Alexandria signed eastbound only
Caddo	Shreveport	12.749– 13.180	20.518– 21.211	13	Monkhouse Drive	To Shreveport Regional Airport
Caddo	Shreveport	14.670– 15.053	23.609– 24.225	14	Jewella Avenue	To State Fair Grounds and Louisiana State Exhibit Museum (signed eastbound)
Caddo	Shreveport	15.824– 16.224	25.466– 26.110	16A	US 171 (Hearne Avenue)	To State Fair Grounds and Louisiana State Exhibit Museum (signed westbound)
Caddo	Shreveport	16.403– 16.761	26.398– 26.974	16B	US 79 / US 80 (Greenwood Road)	To Willis-Knighton Medical Center
Caddo	Shreveport	16.850– 17.972	27.117– 28.923	17A	Lakeshore Drive, Linwood Avenue	To LSU Medical Center and Cross Lake
Caddo	Shreveport	17.236– 18.167	27.739– 29.237	17B	I-49 south / Pete Harris Drive – Alexandria	Northern terminus and exit 206 on I-49
Caddo	Shreveport	18.260– 18.752	29.387– 30.178	18A	Common Street, Line Avenue	Westbound exit via exit 18D
Caddo	Shreveport	18.475– 18.752	29.733– 30.178	18C	Fairfield Avenue	Eastbound entrance and westbound exit
Caddo	Shreveport	18.907	30.428	18D	Common Street, Louisiana Avenue	Westbound exit only (other movements via exit 18A)
Caddo	Shreveport	18.506– 19.367	29.783– 31.168	19A	US 71 / LA 1 north (Spring Street) LA 1 south (Market Street)	Western end of US 71 concurrency; to Shreveport Riverfront Convention Center and VA Medical Center
Red River		19.394– 19.655	31.212– 31.632	Red River Bridge (Purple Heart Recipients Highway)		
Bossier	Bossier City	19.551– 19.995	31.464– 32.179	19B	Traffic Street	To Louisiana Boardwalk
Bossier	Bossier City	19.995– 20.373	32.179– 32.787	20A	Hamilton Road, DiamondJacks Boulevard	To CenturyLink Center
Bossier	Bossier City	20.509– 20.651	33.006– 33.235	20B 20C	LA 3 (Benton Road) US 71 south (Barksdale Boulevard)	Eastern end of US 71 concurrency; southern terminus of LA 3; eastbound exit and westbound entrance
Bossier	Bossier City	21.110– 21.554	33.973– 34.688	21	LA 72 (Old Minden Road) To US 71 south (westbound only)	To Convention Complex
Bossier	Bossier City	22.006– 22.425	35.415– 36.090	22	Airline Drive	Airline Drive is LA 3105 (not signed)
Bossier	Bossier City	23.426– 24.007	37.700– 38.636	23	Industrial Drive – Barksdale AFB	Industrial Drive is LA 782-2 (not signed)
Bossier	Bossier City	25.870– 26.939	41.634– 43.354	26	I-220 west (By-Pass) – Texarkana LA 1267 south – Barksdale AFB	Eastern terminus of I-220; exit 17B on I-220; northern terminus of LA 1267; I-20 has no access to LA 1267; temporary turbine tri-stack interchange for now
Bossier	Haughton	32.872– 33.602	52.902– 54.077	33	LA 157 – Haughton, Fillmore	
Bossier				35	I-69	Proposed; Future I-69
Webster		38.438– 39.165	61.860– 63.030	38	Goodwill Road – Camp Minden	Goodwill Road is Parish Road 117
Webster	Dixie Inn	44.164– 44.663	71.075– 71.878	44	US 371 north – Cotton Valley, Springhill	Western end of US 371 concurrency
Webster	Minden	46.697– 47.322	75.152– 76.157	47	US 371 south – Sibley LA 159 north – Minden	Eastern end of US 371 concurrency; southern terminus of LA 159
Webster	Minden	49.470– 50.017	79.614– 80.495	49	LA 531 – Minden, Dubberly	
Webster		52.173– 52.592	83.964– 84.639	52	LA 532 to US 80 – Dubberly	
Bienville		54.833– 55.324	88.245– 89.035	55	US 80 – Ada, Taylor	
Bienville		60.846– 61.461	97.922– 98.912	61	LA 154 – Gibsland, Athens	
Bienville		67.145– 67.726	108.059– 108.994	67	LA 9 – Arcadia, Homer	To Lake Claiborne State Park
Bienville	Arcadia	69.455– 69.907	111.777– 112.504	69	LA 151 – Arcadia, Dubach	
Lincoln		76.633– 77.213	123.329– 124.262	77	LA 507 – Simsboro	Northern terminus of LA 507
Lincoln		77.776– 78.453	125.168– 126.258	78	LA 563 – Industry	To Simsboro via LA 563 south
Lincoln	Grambling	80.982– 81.666	130.328– 131.429	81	LA 149 – Grambling	Northern terminus of LA 149; to Grambling State University
Lincoln	Ruston	83.413	134.240	83	PR 106 (Tarbutton Road)	Opened June 25, 2020.
Lincoln	Ruston	84.500– 85.069	135.990– 136.905	84	LA 544 – Ruston	To Louisiana Tech University
Lincoln	Ruston	85.408– 86.002	137.451– 138.407	85	US 167 – Ruston, Dubach	US 167 is concurrent with US 63 and LA 146 (not signed); southern terminus of US 63
Lincoln	Ruston	86.556– 87.281	139.298– 140.465	86	LA 33 – Ruston, Farmerville	To Lake D'Arbonne State Park
Lincoln	Choudrant	92.910– 93.439	149.524– 150.375	93	LA 145 – Choudrant, Sibley	To Jimmie Davis State Park
Lincoln		94.925– 95.851	152.767– 154.257	Tremont Eastbound Rest Area (eastbound only)		
Lincoln		96.514– 97.309	155.324– 156.604	Tremont Westbound Rest Area (westbound only)		
Ouachita		101.535– 102.137	163.405– 164.374	101	LA 151 – Calhoun, Downsville	
Ouachita		103.484– 104.267	166.541– 167.801	103	US 80 – Calhoun	
Ouachita		107.010– 107.845	172.216– 173.560	107	PR 25 (Camp Road)	
Ouachita	Cheniere	108.464– 109.087	174.556– 175.559	108	LA 546 to US 80 – Cheniere	
Ouachita	West Monroe	111.660– 112.235	179.699– 180.625	112	Well Road (LA 3249)	LA 3249 is unsigned
Ouachita	West Monroe	112.399– 112.988	180.889– 181.837	113	Downing Pines Road	To Hamilton Expo Center and Well Road
Ouachita	West Monroe	113.667– 114.418	182.929– 184.138	114	LA 617 (Thomas Road)	
Ouachita	West Monroe	114.959– 115.744	185.009– 186.272	115	LA 34 south (Stella Street) LA 34 north (Mill Street)	To West Monroe Historic & Business District
Ouachita	West Monroe	115.828– 116.491	186.407– 187.474	116A	Fifth Street	
Ouachita	West Monroe–Monroe line	116.533– 116.614	187.542– 187.672	116B	US 165 Bus. / LA 15 / Jackson Street – Civic Center	Eastbound exit and westbound entrance
Ouachita	West Monroe–Monroe line	115.672– 117.482	186.156– 189.069	World War II Memorial Bridge over Ouachita River		
Ouachita	Monroe	116.614– 116.829	187.672– 188.018	117A	Catalpa Street	Westbound entrance only
Ouachita	Monroe	116.614– 116.829	187.672– 188.018	117A	Hall Street	Eastbound exit only
Ouachita	Monroe	117.120– 117.250	188.486– 188.696	117D	S. Second Street / Layton Avenue	Westbound exit and eastbound entrance
Ouachita	Monroe	116.859– 117.467	188.066– 189.045	117C	US 165 Bus. / LA 15 – Civic Center	No eastbound exit
Ouachita	Monroe	117.558– 118.111	189.191– 190.081	117B	LA 594 (Texas Avenue) / 18th Street	
Ouachita	Monroe	118.356– 119.151	190.476– 191.755	118	US 165 – Bastrop, Columbia	Signed westbound as exit 118A (south) and 118B (north); to University of Louisiana Monroe
Ouachita	Monroe	119.833– 120.771	192.853– 194.362	120	Garrett Road – Monroe Airport	Eastbound exit provides direct exit ramp to Pecanland Mall Drive
Ouachita	Millhaven	123.716– 124.605	199.102– 200.532	124	LA 594 – Millhaven	To Russell Sage Wildlife Area
Richland	Start	131.506– 132.135	211.638– 212.651	132	LA 133 – Start, Columbia	
Richland	Rayville	137.639– 137.934	221.508– 221.983	138	US 425 – Rayville, Archibald	To Winnsboro via US 425 south
Richland		141.241– 141.937	227.305– 228.425	141	LA 583 (Bee Bayou Road)	Southern terminus of LA 583
Richland		145.275– 145.939	233.797– 234.866	145	LA 183 / PR 202 – Holly Ridge	Southern terminus of LA 183
Richland		147.955– 148.725	238.110– 239.350	148	LA 609 – Dunn	
Richland	Delhi	153.137– 153.860	246.450– 247.614	153	LA 17 – Delhi, Winnsboro	
Madison		157.574– 158.322	253.591– 254.795	157	LA 577 – Waverly	
Madison	Tallulah	170.960– 171.523	275.133– 276.040	171	US 65 – Tallulah, Vidalia	
Madison	Richmond	172.632– 173.367	277.824– 279.007	173	LA 602-1 – Richmond	Southern terminus of LA 602-1
Madison	Mound	182.355– 182.787	293.472– 294.167	182	LA 602-2 – Mound	Southern terminus of LA 602-2
Madison	Delta	183.941– 184.865	296.024– 297.511	Mound Rest Area & Visitor Center (westbound only)		
Madison	Delta	185.780– 186.440	298.984– 300.046	186	US 80 west / LA 3218 – Delta	Western end of US 80 concurrency
Mississippi River		187.763– 189.844	302.175– 305.524	Vicksburg Bridge		
Mississippi River		187.763– 189.844	302.175– 305.524		I-20 east / US 80 east – Vicksburg	Continuation into Mississippi
1.000 mi = 1.609 km; 1.000 km = 0.621 mi: Concurrency terminus; Incomplete access; Unopened

== Auxiliary routes ==
=== Interstate 220 ===
Interstate 220
- Location: Shreveport-Bossier City
- Length: 17.62 mi (28.36 km)
- Existed: 1971–present

Interstate 220 (I-220) in Louisiana is an east–west bypass route around Shreveport, in the northwestern corner of the state. It runs 17.62 miles (28.36 km) from I-20 and Louisiana Highway 3132 (LA 3132) in Shreveport to a second interchange with I-20 in Bossier City. The highway serves as a northern bypass of the downtown area for through traffic traveling on I-20, and, with LA 3132, the highway helps to carry through traffic between the two currently disconnected portions of I-49, the area's main north–south route.

=== Interstate 420 ===
Interstate 420
- Location: Monroe
- Length: 10.2 mi (16.4 km)
- Existed: 1950s–1964

Interstate 420 (I-420) was to be a bypass of Monroe, Louisiana. Initially proposed in the late 1950s, this route was to have been only two lanes wide at a cost $29 million with a projected 2,500 to 3,000 ADT in 1964. The project was effectively canceled on October 12, 1964, when then Louisiana Representative Hale Boggs agreed to no longer seek funding for the route. This was done in favor of focusing all efforts at funding and getting built New Orleans' Vieux Carré Riverfront Expressway.

== Notes ==
Interstate 20
Previous state: Texas	Louisiana	Next state: Mississippi
