= List of Interstate Highways in Louisiana =

Interstate Highways of the Louisiana Highway System
- Highway markers in use for primary interstates (left) and auxiliary interstates (right)
- Interstate Highways highlighted in red

System information
- Length: 933.84 mi (1,502.87 km)
- Formed: June 29, 1956 (authorized); February 24, 1960 (opened); April 23, 1960 (signed)

Highway names
- Interstates: Interstate X (I-X)

System links
- Louisiana State Highway System; Interstate; US; State; Scenic

The Interstate Highway System in Louisiana consists of 933.84 miles (1,502.87 km) of freeways constructed and maintained by the Louisiana Department of Transportation and Development (La DOTD).

The system was authorized on June 29, 1956 when President Dwight D. Eisenhower signed into law the Federal Aid Highway Act of 1956. The Louisiana Department of Highways, predecessor of the DOTD, began construction shortly afterward on its portion of the system, to which approximately 686 miles (1,104 km) was initially allotted. The first road segment in the new system was officially opened and dedicated on February 24, 1960 and consisted of a portion of the Pontchartrain Expressway (I-10) in New Orleans. Two months later, the first Interstate Highway shields installed in Louisiana accompanied the opening of a portion of I-20 near Ruston on April 23.

== Primary Interstates ==
Number	Length (mi)	Length (km)	Southern or western terminus	Northern or eastern terminus	Formed	Removed	Notes
I-10	274.42	441.64	Texas state line at Orange, TX	Mississippi state line east of Slidell	1960	current	Southern Louisiana's primary east–west route serving Lake Charles, Lafayette, Baton Rouge, New Orleans, and Slidell
I-12	85.59	137.74	I-10 in Baton Rouge	I-10/I-59 in Slidell	1967	current	Northern bypass of New Orleans metropolitan area via Hammond
I-14	—	—	Texas state line near Leesville, LA (undecided)	Mississippi state line near Natchez, MS (undecided)	proposed	—	Proposed extension roughly paralleling the LA 28 corridor
I-20	189.87	305.57	Texas state line west of Greenwood	Mississippi state line at Vicksburg, MS	1960	current	Northern Louisiana's primary east–west route serving Shreveport and Monroe
I-49	239.25	385.04	I-10/US 167 in Lafayette I-20 in Shreveport	I-220 in Shreveport Arkansas state line north of Ida	1983	current	Louisiana's primary north–south route, connecting I-10 and I-20 via Alexandria; final gap in Shreveport is under construction and southern extension from Lafayette to New Orleans is planned
I-55	65.81	105.91	I-10/US 51 in LaPlace	Mississippi state line north of Kentwood	1960	current	North–south route in southeastern Louisiana via Hammond
I-59	11.48	18.48	I-10/I-12 in Slidell	Mississippi state line north of Pearl River	1962	current	North–south route in southeastern Louisiana via Slidell
I-69	—	—	Texas state line southwest of Shreveport (undecided)	Arkansas state line northeast of Haynesville (undecided)	proposed	—	Proposed extension roughly paralleling the US 79 corridor
Former; Proposed and unbuilt

== Auxiliary interstates ==
Number	Length (mi)	Length (km)	Southern or western terminus	Northern or eastern terminus	Formed	Removed	Notes
I-110	8.89	14.31	I-10 in Baton Rouge	US 61 in Baton Rouge	1964	current	Baton Rouge spur; formerly designated as I-410
I-210	12.40	19.96	I-10 west of Lake Charles	I-10 east of Lake Charles	1964	current	Lake Charles downtown bypass
I-220	17.62	28.36	I-20/LA 3132 in Shreveport	I-20 in Bossier City	1977	current	Shreveport–Bossier City downtown bypass
I-310	11.25	18.11	US 90/LA 3127 in Boutte	I-10 west of Kenner	1983	current	Spur west of New Orleans
I-310	2.70	4.35	US 90 Bus. in New Orleans	I-10 in New Orleans	1964	1969	Cancelled Vieux Carré Riverfront Expressway
I-410	1.90	3.06	LA 67 in Baton Rouge	I-10 in Baton Rouge	1961	1964	Unfinished Baton Rouge loop partially retained as I-110; planned as 13.60-mile (21.89 km) route with western terminus at I-10 near Port Allen
I-410	48.5	78.1	I-10 west of New Orleans	I-10 in Eastern New Orleans	1969	1977	Cancelled southern bypass of New Orleans known as the Dixie Freeway; partially built as current I-310 and I-510
I-420	10.20	16.42	I-20 in West Monroe	I-20 in Monroe	1957	1964	Cancelled two-lane bypass of Monroe
I-510	3.04	4.89	LA 47 in New Orleans	I-10/LA 47 in New Orleans	1992	current	Spur in Eastern New Orleans
I-610	4.52	7.27	I-10 in New Orleans		1965	current	New Orleans downtown bypass
I-910	9.70	15.61	US 90 Bus. in Marrero	I-10/US 90 Bus. in New Orleans	1999	current	FHWA designation (not used by La DOTD) for freeway portion of US 90 Bus. and placeholder for future I-49 corridor
Former
