= Hilry Huckaby =

Louisiana judge and politician

Hilry Huckaby III

Shreveport City Council, District A

Member of the Shreveport City Council from District A
- In office 1978–1990
- Succeeded by: Cedric Glover
- In office 1998 – 2001 (his death)

Caddo District Judge
- In office 1992–1995

Personal details
- Born: June 27, 1944 Shreveport, Louisiana, US
- Died: June 1, 2001 (aged 56) Shreveport, Louisiana, US
- Spouse: Pearl Esther Huckaby (née Aaron)
- Children: 3
- Education: Southern University

Hilry "Huck" Huckaby III was a former district judge in Caddo Parish, Louisiana and a four-term councilman in the city of Shreveport, Louisiana noted for his work reforming the government of Shreveport. He is known for changing the city of Shreveport government from a commission form of government to a City Council form of government which provided greater representation for the people of Shreveport, especially the African American community.

== Early life ==
Huckaby was born in Shreveport, Louisiana and grew up in the Allendale neighborhood, living about five miles from there for the rest of his life. He was named after his father, Hilry Huckaby Jr.; his mother was named Nancy Davis Huckaby. As a child, he attended Central Free Methodist School. He graduated with honors from Notre Dame High School in 1962 and then attained an undergraduate degree in political science in 1966 and two law degrees, including a Juris Doctor in 1969, from Southern University.

== Career ==
=== Civil Rights ===
Huckaby was devoted to civil rights work and progressive politics primarily within the Shreveport, Louisiana region. After graduating college, Huckaby worked for the Equal Employment Opportunity Commission (EEOC) before starting a private practice in his hometown of Shreveport, Louisiana. Huckaby was actively involved in regional politics from the early 1970s onwards. As a member of Blacks United for Lasting Leadership (BULL), he helped sue the city of Shreveport in 1973-1974 to change the structure of the local government from a commission form of government to a City Council form of government. These efforts helped the African American community gain representation in the Shreveport government.

=== City Councilor ===
In 1978, Huckaby was one of the first African American representatives of the city of Shreveport alongside Senator Greg Tarver and the Reverend Herman Farr, with Huckaby becoming the city's first African American council chairman in 1979. He served as the councilor for District A from 1978 to 1990, and from 1998 until his death in 2001.

=== Judgeship and Controversy ===
After losing his bid for re-election as city councilor in 1990, he successfully ran for the position of Caddo District Judge in 1992. In 1995, it was reported that Huckaby had failed to file tax returns from 1981 to 1992, and was found to owe $146,311.25 USD in 1995 ($274303.54 USD today). Huckaby plead guilty to failing to file his 1987 tax return, and was sentenced to one year in jail, one year supervised release, a US$5000 fine and orders to pay his owed taxes for 1987. This resulted in Huckaby being removed as district judge by the Louisiana Supreme Court in 1995. His trial was highly publicized, with some seeing his punishment as not harsh enough and others believing that he was being prosecuted because he was African American. After losing another judge election after his release from prison in 1996, He was later re-elected to represent Shreveport District A in 1998, a position he held until his death in 2001.

=== Membership ===
Huckaby belonged to a large number of organizations throughout his career, including:

- Louisiana State Bar Association
- Black Lawyers Association of Shreveport-Bossier
- Omega Psi Phi fraternity
- Louisiana Municipal Black Caucus Association
- Prince Hall Mason-33rd Degree
- NAACP
- Southern University Alumni Association
- Southern University Law School Alumni Association
- Lakeside Baptist Church (Trustee Board)

== Personal life ==
Huckaby and his first wife, Cheryl, had two children: Kimberly and Hilry IV. Years later, Huckaby and his second wife, Pearl, had one daughter, Kylaa. Huckaby enjoyed spending time with his family, friends, and community members in his free time. Former Councilman C. O. Simpkins was quoted describing Huckaby's farm north as Shreveport as Huckaby's "home away from home. He had two trailers and one was used for guests. He had hogs, and he liked to barbecue and show off those pigs. We played cards and talked about life."

== Death ==
Huckaby died of a heart attack at the age of 56, attributed to existing health conditions and to possibly overworking himself in his job.

== Legacy ==
Huckaby was noted for spending time with members of his community, and was referred to as one of Shreveport's "favorite sons" by Reverend Joe Grant because of his work.

There is a road in Shreveport, Louisiana named for him.
