= Bryceland =

Bryceland may refer to:

- Bryceland, Louisiana, a town in the United States
- Tommy Bryceland (1939–2016), former Norwich City footballer
