= Louisiana Highway 3132 =

Highway in Louisiana

Louisiana Highway 3132
- Terry Bradshaw Passway; (or the Inner Loop Expressway)
- Route of LA 3132 highlighted in red

Route information
- Maintained by Louisiana DOTD
- Length: 10.254 mi (16.502 km)
- Existed: July 27, 1977–present

Major junctions
- West end: I-20 / I-220 in Shreveport
- US 171 in Shreveport; I-49 in Shreveport
- East end: LA 523 in Shreveport

Location
- Country: United States
- State: Louisiana
- Parishes: Caddo

Highway system
- Louisiana State Highway System; Interstate; US; State; Scenic
← LA 3131	→ LA 3134

Louisiana Highway 3132 (LA 3132) is a freeway located in Shreveport, Louisiana. It runs 10.25 miles (16.50 km) in a general east–west direction from the junction of Interstates 20 and 220 to LA 523, serving as a southwestern bypass of the downtown area. With I-220, the highway helps to carry through traffic between the two disconnected portions of Interstate 49 (I-49), the area's main north–south route.

Though the controlled-access highway was officially designated as the Terry Bradshaw Passway in 2003, it is commonly known as the Inner Loop Expressway and is still signed as such from intersecting routes.

== Route description ==
From the west, LA 3132 begins at a partial cloverleaf interchange with I-20 (exit 11) and I-220 (exits 1B–C) in Shreveport, the largest city in northwestern Louisiana. The interchange forms the western terminus of I-220, a northern bypass of Shreveport and neighboring Bossier City. I-20 connects with downtown Shreveport to the east and Dallas, Texas to the west. LA 3132 heads south initially as a six-lane controlled-access highway alongside Shreveport Regional Airport and passes through a diamond interchange with LA 511 (West 70th Street). Narrowing to four lanes, LA 3132 proceeds through a sparsely developed area and curves due east. The highway then has interchanges with three north–south thoroughfares in quick succession: the local roads Walker Road (exit 3) and Jewella Avenue (exit 4), followed by US 171 (Mansfield Road). Eastbound traffic must access the latter via exit 4 while westbound traffic uses the independent exit 5.

Continuing eastward through a largely residential area, LA 3132 engages into a four-level stack interchange with I-49, the main route between Shreveport and Alexandria, at exit 7. This is closely followed by diamond interchanges with LA 523 (Ellerbe Road/Line Avenue) and LA 526 (Bert Kouns Industrial Loop) at exits 8 and 9, respectively. Soon afterward, traffic is forced onto exit 10 to an at-grade intersection with LA 523, which connects to LA 1 in an area on the Shreveport city limits known as Lucas. Pavement stubs separated from the exit ramps by Jersey barriers indicate a planned direct connection to LA 1 on the south side of town.

=== Route classification and data ===
LA 3132 is classified as an urban freeway by the Louisiana Department of Transportation and Development (La DOTD). Daily traffic volume in 2013 averaged between 38,800 and 44,300 vehicles. The posted speed limit is 60 mph (95 km/h).

== History ==
LA 3132 was designated in the late 1960s as a southern bypass loop of the Shreveport metropolitan area. The highway was to have crossed the Red River by way of the existing Jimmie Davis Bridge on LA 511 constructed in 1968. As part of the Louisiana Department of Highways' Proposed Five-Year Highway Construction Program in 1970, a second bridge was to be constructed to create a four-lane crossing of the river, but this never came to fruition. The first section of the Inner Loop Expressway was opened on July 27, 1977 and followed the current route of LA 526 from LA 511 near the bridge southwest to the present LA 3132, then northwest on the present LA 3132 to Linwood Avenue. The highway was extended west across US 171 (Mansfield Road) to Jewella Avenue in 1980, then west and north to I-20 in 1984.

I-49 was extended north into Shreveport to a temporary terminus at LA 3132 around 1991. LA 3132 served as the main connector to eastbound I-20 until the two interstates were directly connected in December 1995. By the mid-1990s, as plans for the Inner Loop Expressway changed, the portion of LA 3132 connecting to LA 511 at the Jimmie Davis Bridge became part of LA 526. LA 3132 was then extended on its east end straight across LA 526 to a new terminus at LA 523. This last project was completed in September 2007.

In 2003, the highway was officially designated by an act of the Louisiana state legisture as the "Terry Bradshaw Passway" in honor of the Shreveport native and professional football star. The change had been proposed as far back as 1989 and was met with opposition by local residents. As Bradshaw was a living person and no longer a Louisiana resident, some favored honoring either a deceased cultural hero or war veteran. Bradshaw appeared in person as the first signs bearing the new name were erected along the highway in November 2005.

== Future ==
La DOTD is currently planning to extend LA 3132 from LA 523 southeast to intersect LA 1 south of Lucas, a distance of 1.93 miles (3.11 km). They plan on extending LA 3132 south from LA 523 to future I-69 once it is built.

There are five options currently in contention for closing the gap in I-49 in Shreveport. Four of these options involve the construction of a new alignment extending from the existing I-49/I-20 interchange to the I-49/I-220 interchange. This direct connection, known as the Inner City Connector, is controversial due to its path being projected through a residential neighborhood, which would necessitate the displacement of many of its residents. The fifth option involves routing through traffic via the existing LA 3132 and I-220 alignments after necessary improvements to those highways are carried out.

== Exit list ==
The entire highway is in Shreveport, Caddo Parish.

mi	km	Exit	Destinations	Notes
0.000	0.000		I-220 east to I-49 north – Texarkana	Continuation east
0.000	0.000	1	I-20 – Monroe, Dallas	Signed as exits 1B (west) and 1C (east); exit 11 on I-20
0.591– 1.279	0.951– 2.058	1D	LA 511 (West 70th Street)	
3.412– 4.000	5.491– 6.437	3	Walker Road	
4.438– 5.115	7.142– 8.232	4	Jewella Avenue (Mansfield Road) to US 171	US 171 not signed westbound
5.280– 5.465	8.497– 8.795	5	US 171 (Mansfield Road)	Westbound exit and eastbound entrance
6.488– 7.155	10.441– 11.515	6	Linwood Avenue	
7.181– 8.041	11.557– 12.941	7	I-49 – Shreveport, Alexandria	Exit 201 on I-49
8.128– 8.606	13.081– 13.850	8	LA 523 (Ellerbe Road / Line Avenue)	
8.907– 9.517	14.334– 15.316	9	LA 526 (Bert Kouns Industrial Loop)	
10.254	16.502	10	LA 523 (Flournoy Lucas Road)	Current eastern terminus
			Leonard Road	Proposed
			I-69	Proposed eastern terminus
1.000 mi = 1.609 km; 1.000 km = 0.621 mi: Incomplete access; Proposed
