= Interstate 20 =

Interstate in southern US

Interstate 20

Route information
- Length: 1,539.38 mi (2,477.39 km)
- Existed: August 14, 1957–present
- NHS: Entire route

Major junctions
- West end: I-10 in Reeves County, TX
- I-30 in Aledo, TX; I-35W in Fort Worth, TX; I-35E in Dallas, TX; I-45 in Dallas, TX; I-49 in Shreveport, LA; I-55 in Jackson, MS; I-59 from Meridian, MS to Birmingham, AL; I-65 in Birmingham, AL; I-75 / I-85 in Atlanta, GA; I-26 / I-77 in Columbia, SC
- East end: I-95 / I-20 BS in Florence, SC

Location
- Country: United States
- States: Texas, Louisiana, Mississippi, Alabama, Georgia, South Carolina

Highway system
- Interstate Highway System; Main; Auxiliary; Suffixed; Business; Future

Interstate 20 (I‑20) is a major east–west Interstate Highway in the Southern United States. I-20 runs 1,539 miles (2,477 km) beginning at an interchange with I-10 in Reeves County, Texas, 40 miles (64 km) east of Van Horn, Texas, and ending at an interchange with I-95 in Florence, South Carolina. Between Texas and South Carolina, I-20 runs through northern Louisiana, Mississippi, Alabama, and Georgia. The major cities that I-20 connects to include Dallas-Fort Worth, Texas; Shreveport, Louisiana; Jackson, Mississippi; Birmingham, Alabama; Atlanta, Georgia; and Columbia, South Carolina.

From its terminus at I-95, the highway continues about two miles (3.2 km) eastward into the city of Florence as I-20 Business (I-20 Bus.).

== Route description ==
Lengths
	mi	km
TX	636.08	1,023.67
LA	189.87	305.57
MS	154.61	248.82
AL	214.70	345.53
GA	202.61	326.07
SC	141.51	227.74
Total	1,539.38	2,477.39

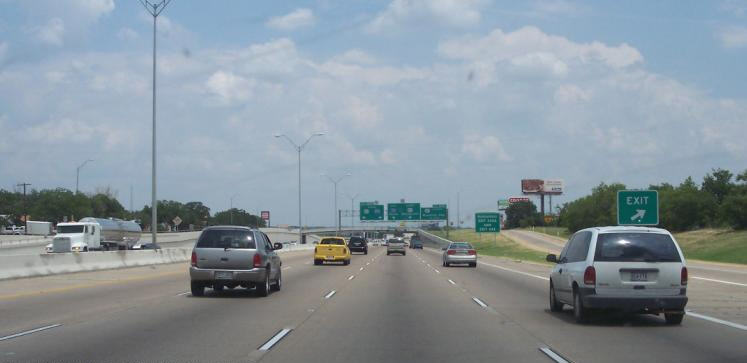
I-20 in southern Fort Worth, Texas

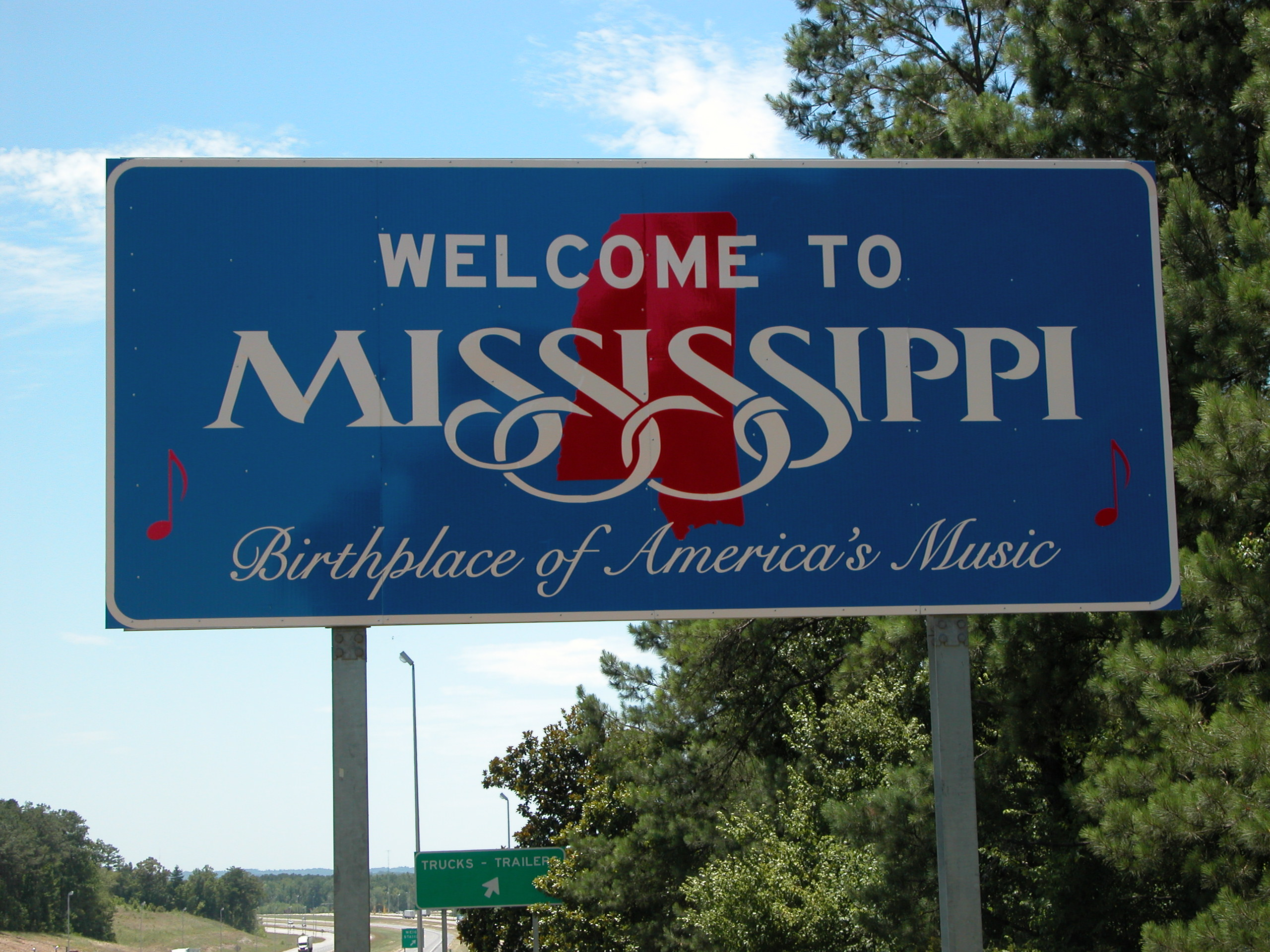
The Mississippi welcome sign along westbound I-20

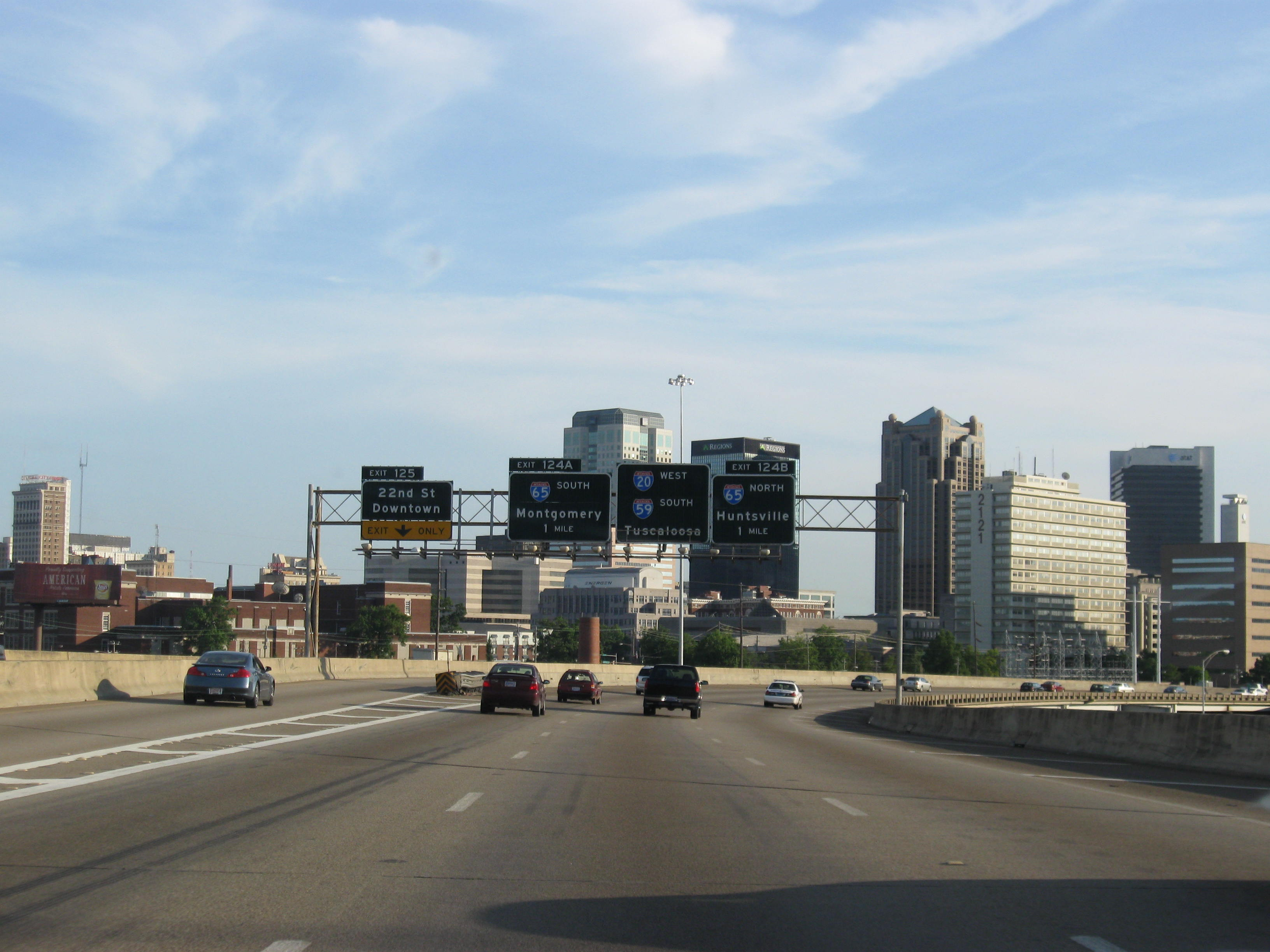
I-20 (cosigned with I-59) approaching I-65 in downtown Birmingham, Alabama, at the interchange that is sometimes referred to as Malfunction Junction

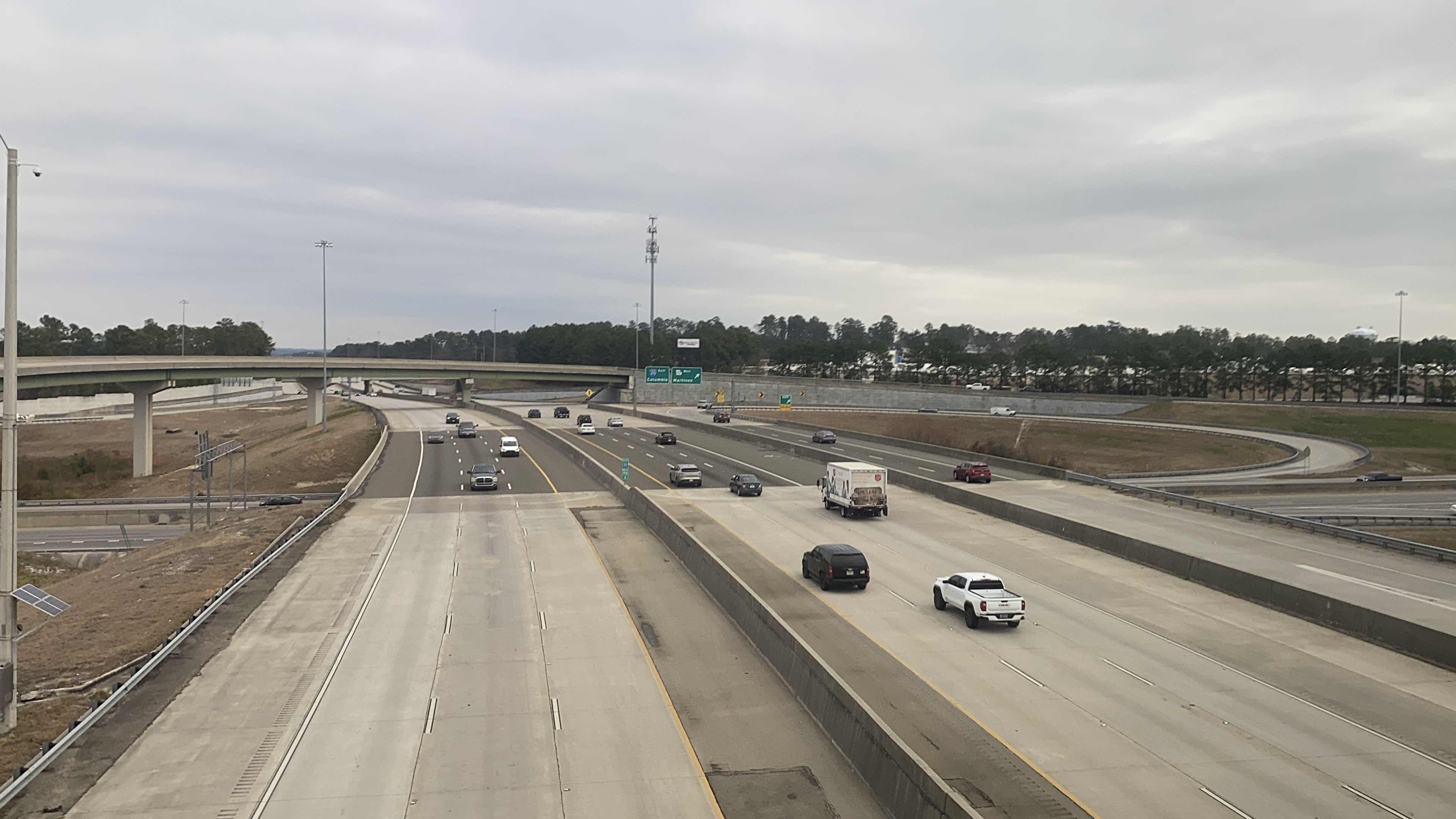
I-20 viewing eastbound at the I-520 interchange from flyover ramp to I-520 in Augusta, Georgia

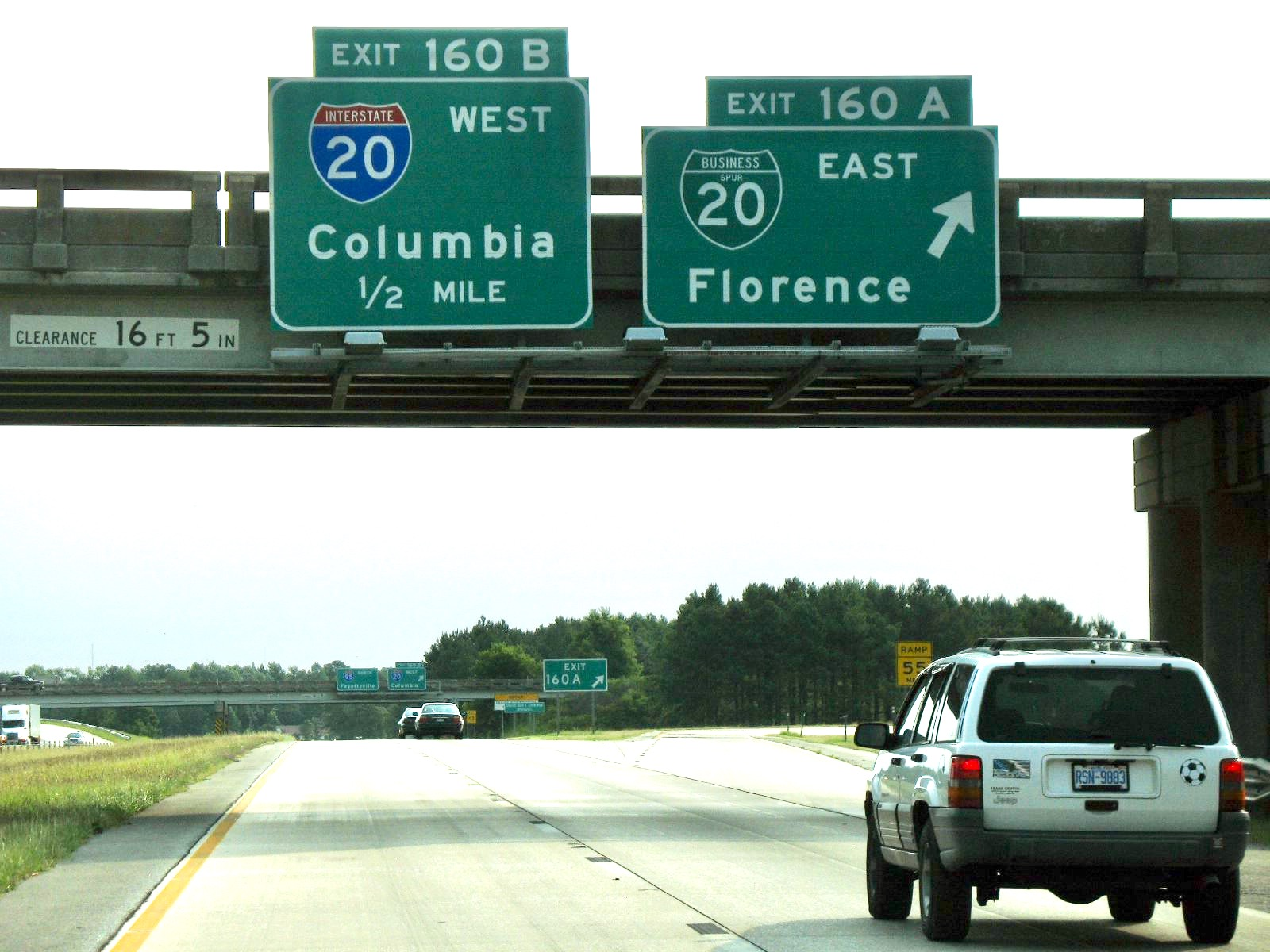
Approaching the eastern terminus of I-20 on I-95, Florence, South Carolina

I-20 spans approximately 2/3 of the United States between Texas and South Carolina serving major southern economic hubs such as Dallas–Fort Worth and Atlanta.

=== Texas ===
I-20 begins in western Reeves County at a fork with I-10. From there, the highway travels east-northeastward through Odessa, Midland, and Abilene before turning eastward toward the Dallas–Fort Worth metroplex. The La Entrada al Pacífico corridor runs along I-20 between US Route 385 (US 385) and Farm to Market Road 1788 (FM 1788). Between Monahans and I-10, I-20 has an 80-mile-per-hour (130 km/h) speed limit.

From the highway's opening in the 1960s through 1977, I-20 originally went through the heart of the metroplex via the Dallas–Fort Worth Turnpike. This old route is now signed I-30 (Dallas–Fort Worth Turnpike and from US 80/I-30 intersection at Mesquite to Downtown Dallas), US 80 (former stretch between I-635 and Terrell), and Spur 557 (bypass around Terrell). In 1977, I-20 was rerouted to go through the southern sections of Fort Worth, Arlington, Grand Prairie, Dallas, and Mesquite. It split off from the old route initially at I-820 in west Fort Worth the later on at its current junction near Aledo in Parker County. It rejoins the old route near Terrell. Part of I-20 in Dallas used to be signed as I-635 and shares the Lyndon B. Johnson Freeway name with the remainder of I-635. Parts on the south side of Fort Worth were originally signed as I-820.

I-20 continues eastward from Terrell, bypassing Tyler, Kilgore, Longview, and Marshall before crossing the Louisiana border near Waskom.

=== Louisiana ===
In Louisiana, I-20 roughly parallels US 80 through the northern part of the state.

Entering the state from near Wachom, Texas, the highway immediately enters the Shreveport–Bossier City metropolitan area, intersecting I-49 near downtown Shreveport and passing close to Barksdale Air Force Base in Bossier City.

I-20 traverses mainly rural, hilly terrain, bypassing Minden, Grambling, and Ruston before reaching Monroe.

From Monroe, I-20 enters flatter terrain as it approaches the Mississippi River. Before crossing the Mississippi, the highway passes Tallulah. At the Mississippi River, I-20 leaves Louisiana and enters Vicksburg.

=== Mississippi ===
Upon entering Mississippi by crossing the Mississippi River, I-20 immediately enters Vicksburg. Between Edwards and Clinton, the highway mostly follows the original two-lane routing of US 80. In Jackson, I-20 sees a short concurrency with both I-55 and US 49. Also in Jackson is an unusually expansive stack interchange, at the junction of I-20, I-55 north, and US 49 south. The interchange replaces a former directional interchange at I-55 north and a cloverleaf interchange at US 49. From the stack, I-20 continues eastward to Meridian, where it begins the nearly 160-mile (260 km) overlap with I-59.

The route of the Mississippi section of I-20 is defined in Mississippi Code § 65-3-3.

=== Alabama ===
I-20 (along with I-59) crosses the Alabama state line near York, and it stays conjoined as it passes through western Alabama and Tuscaloosa. At Birmingham, the two highways pass through downtown together before splitting at exit 130 just east of Birmingham–Shuttlesworth International Airport. I-20 continues eastward through Oxford–Anniston and the Talladega National Forest, passing by Talladega Superspeedway in the process, which is visible from the highway.

Also in Birmingham, the intersection of I-20/I-59 and I-65 was known as a Malfunction Junction because of the interchange's somewhat-confusing design, and the number of traffic accidents that occurred there. This section of the Interstate and its interchanges have since been reconfigured.

=== Georgia ===
I-20 enters Georgia near Tallapoosa and after passing through western Georgia, it enters the Atlanta metropolitan area. On clear days, eastbound motorists get their first view of Downtown Atlanta as they come over the top of Six Flags Hill. The Six Flags Over Georgia amusement park is easily visible off exit 46 eastbound. The highway then passes through the center of Atlanta, meeting with I-75 and I-85, which share a common expressway (the Downtown Connector). It continues through the Atlanta metropolitan area eastward and through the eastern half of Georgia until it exits the state, crossing the Savannah River at Augusta.

Throughout the state, I-20 is conjoined with unsigned State Route 402 (SR 402). Also, I-20 from the Alabama state line to I-285 in Atlanta is named the "Tom Murphy Freeway", but it is called the "Ralph David Abernathy Freeway" within I-285. The Interstate Highway is also named the Purple Heart Highway from I-285 in DeKalb County to US 129/US 441/SR 24 in Madison, Georgia, and it is called the Carl Sanders Highway from US 129/US 441/SR 24 to the South Carolina state line.

=== South Carolina ===
Upon leaving Augusta, I-20 crosses the Savannah River and enters the Palmetto State and heads northeastward, bypassing Aiken and Lexington before reaching the state capital of Columbia, which can be reached most directly by taking I-26 east at exit 64 ("Malfunction Junction"), then, almost immediately, I-126/US 76.

At Columbia, I-20 bypasses the city to the north and again turns northeastward, bypassing Fort Jackson and Camden. After crossing the Wateree River, it turns due east and passes by tiny Bishopville, before reaching the Florence area. It is near Florence where I-20 sees its eastern terminus at I-95. However, for about two miles (3.2 km), the highway continues into Florence as I-20 Bus.

I-20 in the Palmetto State is known as either the J. Strom Thurmond Freeway or John C. West Freeway. The first section to be completed was the bridge over the Savannah River in 1965; the last, the section between US 401 and I-95 (including the business spur), opened in August 1975.

== History ==
I-20 was built in 1957 connecting Texas to the east coast running through Shreveport, Ruston, and Monroe making it its first Interstate.

I-20's exit numbers in Georgia were changed in 2000.

In 2003, the North Carolina Department of Transportation (NCDOT) proposed extending I-20 eastward from Florence, South Carolina, to Wilmington, North Carolina, at the behest of North Carolina Governor Mike Easley and his Strategic Transportation Plan for the southeast portion of the state. The proposed route would follow US 76 east from Florence to Whiteville, North Carolina, then parallel US 74/US 76 into Wilmington. Part of this route is already designated the future eastern extension of I-74. As part of the 2005 Safe, Accountable, Flexible, Efficient Transportation Equity Act: A Legacy for Users transportation legislation, North Carolina received $5 million (equivalent to $7.91 million in 2025) for a feasibility study for this extension. While this extension has considerable support among towns in southeastern North Carolina, the South Carolina Department of Transportation (SCDOT) has stated that they have no interest in upgrading their portion of US 76 to an Interstate. Instead, South Carolina is concentrating its efforts on plans to build I-73 (and possibly I-74) that will terminate near Myrtle Beach.

== Junction list ==
Texas
I-10 in Reeves County
US 285 in Pecos
US 385 in Odessa
US 87 in Big Spring
US 84 east of Roscoe. The highways travel concurrently to the Tye–Abilene city line.
US 83 / US 277 in Abilene
US 283 in Baird
US 183 in Cisco
US 281 south-southeast of Brazos
US 180 in Hudson Oaks
I-30 northeast of Aledo
I-820 in Fort Worth
Chisholm Trail Parkway in Fort Worth
US 377 in Benbrook
I-35W in Fort Worth
I-820 / US 287 in Fort Worth. I-20/US 287 travels concurrently to Arlington.
Pres. George Bush Turnpike in Grand Prairie
US 67 in Dallas
I-35E on the Dallas–Lancaster city line
I-45 on the Dallas–Hutchins city line
US 175 on the Dallas–Balch Springs city line
I-635 in Balch Springs
US 69 in Lindale
US 271 south-southeast of Winona
US 259 northeast of Kilgore. The highways travel concurrently to Longview.
Future I-369 / US 59 in Marshall
US 80 west-southwest of Jonesville. The highways travel concurrently to west of Waskom.
Louisiana
US 79 / US 80 in Greenwood
US 80 in Shreveport
I-220 in Shreveport
US 171 in Shreveport
US 79 / US 80 in Shreveport
I-49 in Shreveport
US 71 in Shreveport. The highways travel concurrently to Bossier City.
I-220 in Bossier City
Future I-69 near Haughton
US 371 in Dixie Inn. The highways travel concurrently to Minden.
US 80 southeast of Minden
US 63 / US 167 in Ruston
US 80 east-northeast of Calhoun
US 165 in Monroe
US 425 in Rayville
US 65 in Tallulah
US 80 in Delta. The highways travel concurrently to Clinton, Mississippi.
Mississippi
US 61 in Vicksburg. The highways travel concurrently through Vicksburg.
I-220 / US 49 in Jackson. I-20/US 49 travels concurrently to Pearl.
I-55 / US 51 in Jackson. I-20/I-55 travels concurrently to Richland
US 80 in Brandon
US 80 in Brandon
US 80 east-southeast of Lake
US 80 west-southwest of Meridian. The highways travel concurrently to Meridian.
I-59 in Meridian. The highways travel concurrently to Birmingham, Alabama.
US 11 in Meridian. The highways travel concurrently through Meridian.
US 45 in Meridian
US 11 / US 80 west-northwest of Kewanee
Alabama
Future I-85 near Cuba
US 11 / US 43 south of Knoxville
I-359 / US 11 in Tuscaloosa
US 82 in Tuscaloosa
US 11 in Tuscaloosa
US 11 in Tuscaloosa
US 11 south of Lake View. The highways travel concurrently to Bessemer.
I-459 southwest of McCalla
US 78 in Birmingham
I-65 in Birmingham
US 31 / US 280 in Birmingham
US 11 in Birmingham
I-459 in Irondale
US 78 in Leeds
US 411 on the Leeds–Moody line
US 78 northwest of Cooks Springs. The highways travel concurrently to Pell City.
US 231 in Pell City
US 78 in Riverside
US 431 east of Oxford
Georgia
US 27 in Bremen
I-285 in Atlanta
I-75 / I-85 in Atlanta
US 23 in Atlanta
I-285 on the Panthersville–Candler-McAfee CDP line
US 278 southeast of Lithonia. The highways travel concurrently to Covington.
US 278 in Social Circle
US 129 / US 441 in Madison
US 278 in Barnett
US 221 south of Appling
I-520 in Augusta
South Carolina
US 25 in North Augusta
I-520 in North Augusta
US 1 north-northeast of Aiken
US 178 southeast of Batesburg-Leesville
US 1 east of Lexington
US 378 north of Oak Grove
I-26 / US 76 on the Seven Oaks–St. Andrews CDP line
US 176 in St. Andrews
US 321 north of Columbia
US 21 in Columbia
US 1 in Dentsville
I-77 on the Dentsville–Woodfield CDP line
US 601 in Lugoff
US 521 in Camden
US 15 southwest of Bishopville
US 401 northeast of Lamar
I-95 in Florence

== Auxiliary routes ==
Two I-420s were planned but never completed or built. One was to be a bypass around Monroe, Louisiana, but was never built. The other I-420 was planned as a bypass to the south of Downtown Atlanta. Due to anti-freeway sentiments, this I-420 was never completed, and the already-built portion has been signed as State Route 154 (SR 154)/SR 166, named the Langford Parkway (formerly the Lakewood Freeway).

- Shreveport, Louisiana: I-220
- Jackson, Mississippi: I-220
- Augusta, Georgia: I-520
- Fort Worth, Texas: I-820
