= Conway, Louisiana =

Coordinates: 32°53′19″N 92°23′47″W

Conway
- Village
- Village of Conway
- Interactive map of Conway
- Country: United States
- States: Louisiana
- Parish: Union
- Incorporated (village): End of 2014
- Elevation: 148 ft (45 m)
- GNIS feature ID: 543102

Conway is a village located in Union Parish in the state of Louisiana. The village is 8.3 miles north of Farmerville, the parish seat.

== Highways ==
- Louisiana Highway 348
- Louisiana Highway 549
