= Taylortown, Louisiana =

- village
- Location within Louisiana Location within the United States
- Coordinates: 32°23′12″N 93°35′46″W
- Country: United States
- State: Louisiana
- Parish: Bossier
- Elevation: 151 ft (46 m)
- GNIS feature ID: 539809

Taylortown is a plantation village in Bossier Parish, Louisiana, United States. It is located near a junction of US-71, La- 527, and Ash Point road, on the Red River, between Moon and Red Chute Lakes.

It is part of the Shreveport-Bossier City Metropolitan Statistical Area and a suburb of Shreveport.
