= Weston, Louisiana =

Unincorporated community in Louisiana, U.S.

Coordinates: 32°14′39″N 92°36′49″W

Weston is an unincorporated community in Jackson Parish, Louisiana, United States. The community is located between Jonesboro and Chatham.

Weston has a pre-k through 12th grade school. Weston High School's mascot is a wolf.
