= U.S. Route 79 =

Highway in the United States

U.S. Route 79
- US 79 highlighted in red

Route information
- Length: 855 mi (1,376 km)
- Existed: 1935–present

Major junctions
- South end: I-35 in Round Rock, TX
- I-45 in Buffalo, TX; I-20 in Shreveport, LA; I-55 in West Memphis, AR; I-40 in Memphis, TN; I-24 in Clarksville, TN
- North end: US 68 / US 68 Bus. / KY 80 in Russellville, KY

Location
- Country: United States
- States: Texas, Louisiana, Arkansas, Tennessee, Kentucky

Highway system
- United States Numbered Highway System; List; Special; Divided
← US 78	→ US 80

U.S. Route 79 (US 79) is a United States highway in the Southern United States. The route is officially considered and signed as a north–south highway, but its path is more of a diagonal northeast–southwest highway. The highway's northern/eastern terminus is in Russellville, Kentucky, at a junction with U.S. 68. Its southern/western terminus is in Round Rock, Texas, at an interchange with Interstate 35, ten miles (16 km) north of Austin. US 79, US 68, and Interstate 24/US 62 are the primary east–west access points for the Land Between the Lakes recreation area straddling the Kentucky/Tennessee border.

== Route description ==
=== Texas ===
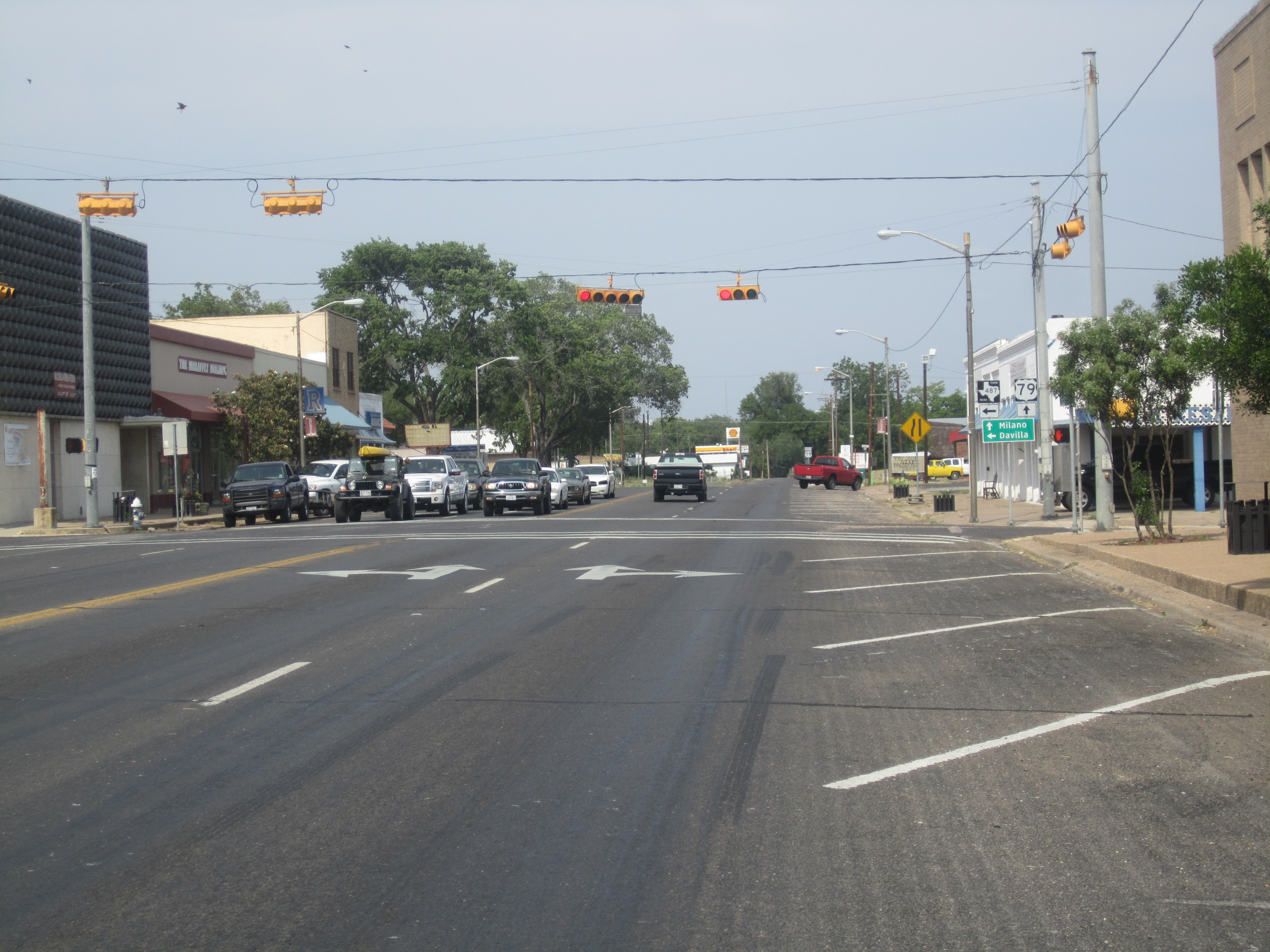
US 79 is the main street of Rockdale in Milam County, Texas.

US 79 begins at Interstate 35's Exit #253 north of Austin in Round Rock. The route travels eastward through Hutto and Taylor to Rockdale, where it intersects US 77. In Milano, US 79 turns to the northeast and begins a concurrency with US 190 until Hearne. The route continues through Franklin and Jewett before reaching Buffalo, where it intersects Interstate 45 at its Exit #178. US 79 has a brief duplex with US 84 that begins near Oakwood and continues through Palestine before separating; here US 79 also intersects US 287. The route continues to the northeast through Jacksonville, where it has a junction with US 69, and Henderson, where it crosses US 259. The highway then travels due east to Carthage, where it meets US 59 (Future I-369), before resuming a northeasterly direction and crossing into Louisiana near Panola. US 79 is also entwined with two tragedies of country music. Johnny Horton was killed by a drunk driver on the highway near Milano in 1960 and Jim Reeves, killed in a plane crash in 1964, is buried and memorialized on US 79 in his hometown of Carthage.

=== Louisiana ===
US 79 joins US 80 near Greenwood, and the two routes are cosigned through Shreveport. US 79/80 cross the Red River over the Texas Street Bridge and continue into Bossier City. The routes parallel Interstate 20 through the old Bossier City Entertainment District until Minden, where the two routes separate: US 80 continues eastward, while US 79 turns to the northeast toward Homer. In Homer, the route resumes a more northerly direction, traveling through Haynesville before crossing the Arkansas border about 7 miles (11 km) south of Emerson.

=== Arkansas ===
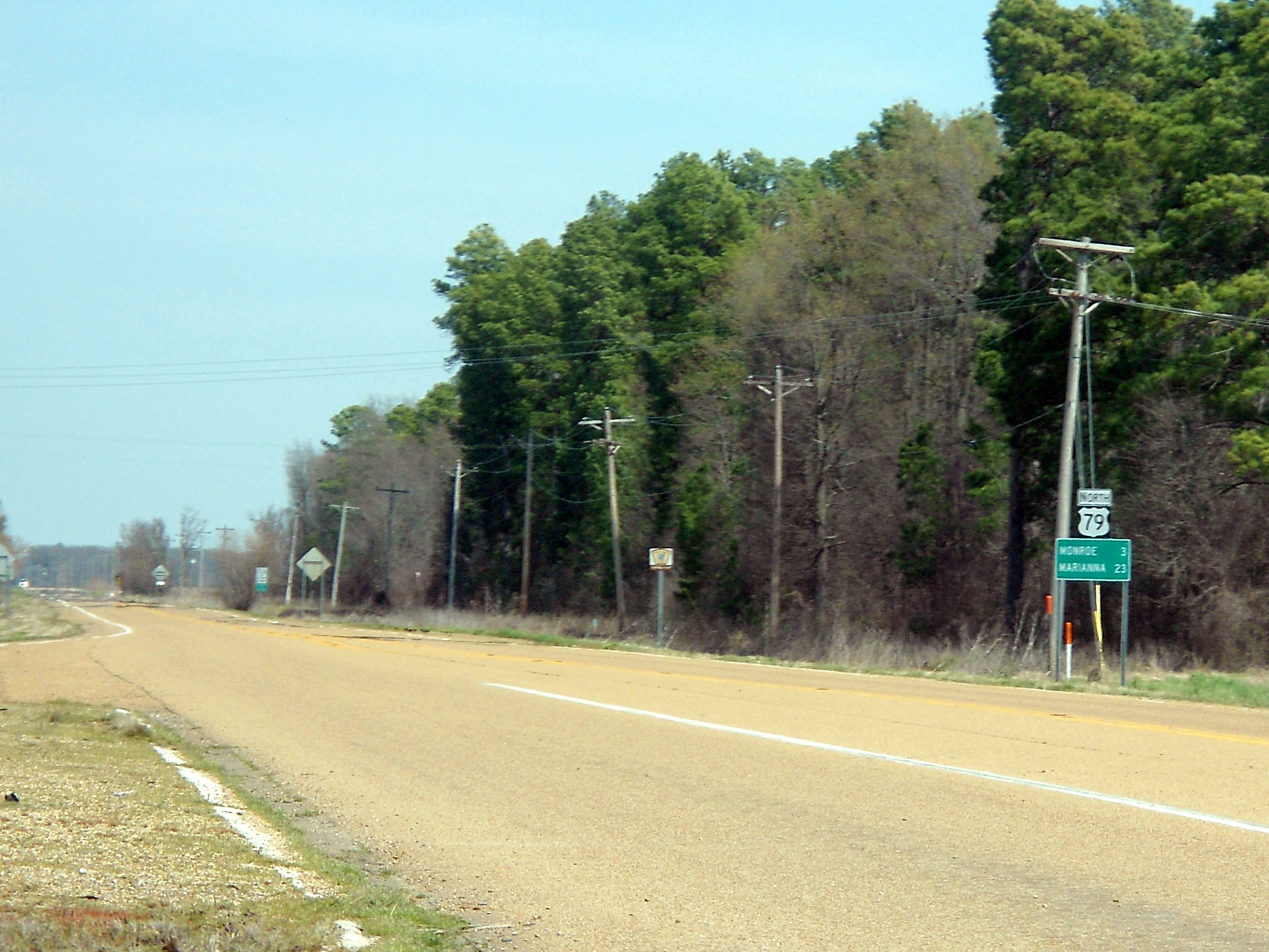
US 79 north of US 49 junction near Monroe. This segment is also an Arkansas Heritage Trail Trail of Tears route.

US 79 continues northward from Louisiana into Emerson and then Magnolia, where it has a brief concurrency with US 82 through the city. From here, the route turns to the northeast, through Camden, where it intersects US 278, and Fordyce, in which it has a brief concurrency with US 167. East of Kingsland, the highway travels in a more northerly direction as it prepares to enter the Pine Bluff metropolitan area. In Pine Bluff, U.S. 79 joins the Interstate 530 freeway, while a business route continues through downtown. After the freeway ends, US 79 and US 63, with which it is cosigned, leave the city toward the north. The two routes stay joined until Stuttgart. US 79 continues to the east and northeast, through Marianna and Hughes, before turning due north to an intersection with Interstate 40 near Jennette. US 79 joins I-40 and the two routes stay cosigned through the concurrency with Interstate 55 in West Memphis, before US 79 joins I-55 to cross the Mississippi River at the Memphis & Arkansas Bridge into Memphis.

=== Tennessee ===
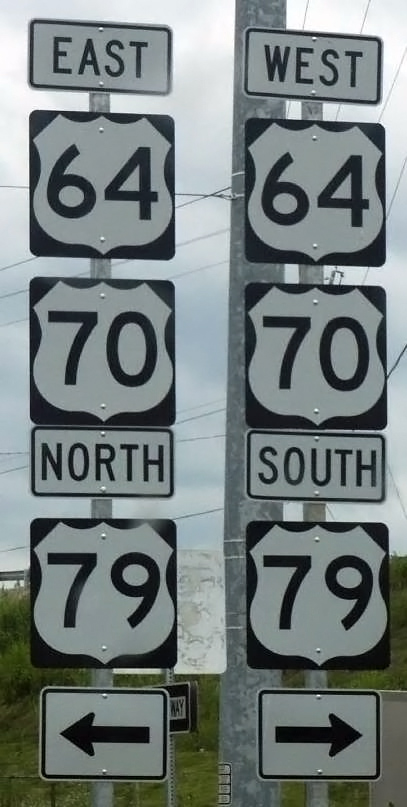
Directional assembly for U.S. Highways 64, 70, and 79 in Memphis, Tennessee.

US 79 enters Memphis with US 70, US 64 and Tennessee State Route 1, travelling east along E.H. Crump Boulevard, turns north on Third Street and travels through Downtown Memphis along both Second and Third Streets (3rd St is three lanes of northbound traffic and 2nd St is three lanes southbound). It continues east on Union Avenue, north along East Parkway, and east along Summer Avenue. At Stage Road in Bartlett, it continues along Summer Avenue with US 70, while US 64 turns east along Stage Rd.

From here, US 79 continues north from Bartlett, passing through the rest of Shelby County as a four-lane undivided highway. In Arlington, the road narrows to two lanes and passes through Fayette, Tipton and Haywood counties until Brownsville. In Brownsville, US 79, along with US 70 and SR 1, goes to the south along a bypass (named Dupree Avenue). On the east side of the city, US 70 and SR 1 turn east while US 79 and 70A continue to the northeast, passing through Crockett and Gibson Counties. The section from Milan to the Carroll County line was widened to four lanes. US 70A splits off from US 79 near Atwood and US 79 continues to the northeast into Henry County, passing through the city of Paris, then crosses the Tennessee River. The portion from McKenzie to the Tennessee River is four lanes, and plans are in the works to widen the portion in between this section and the Milan section. The section from Brownsville to the Tennessee River is part of the "Austin Peay Memorial Highway" (the other portions being TN 14 from I-240 to TN 54, and the part of TN 54 from TN 14 to US 79).

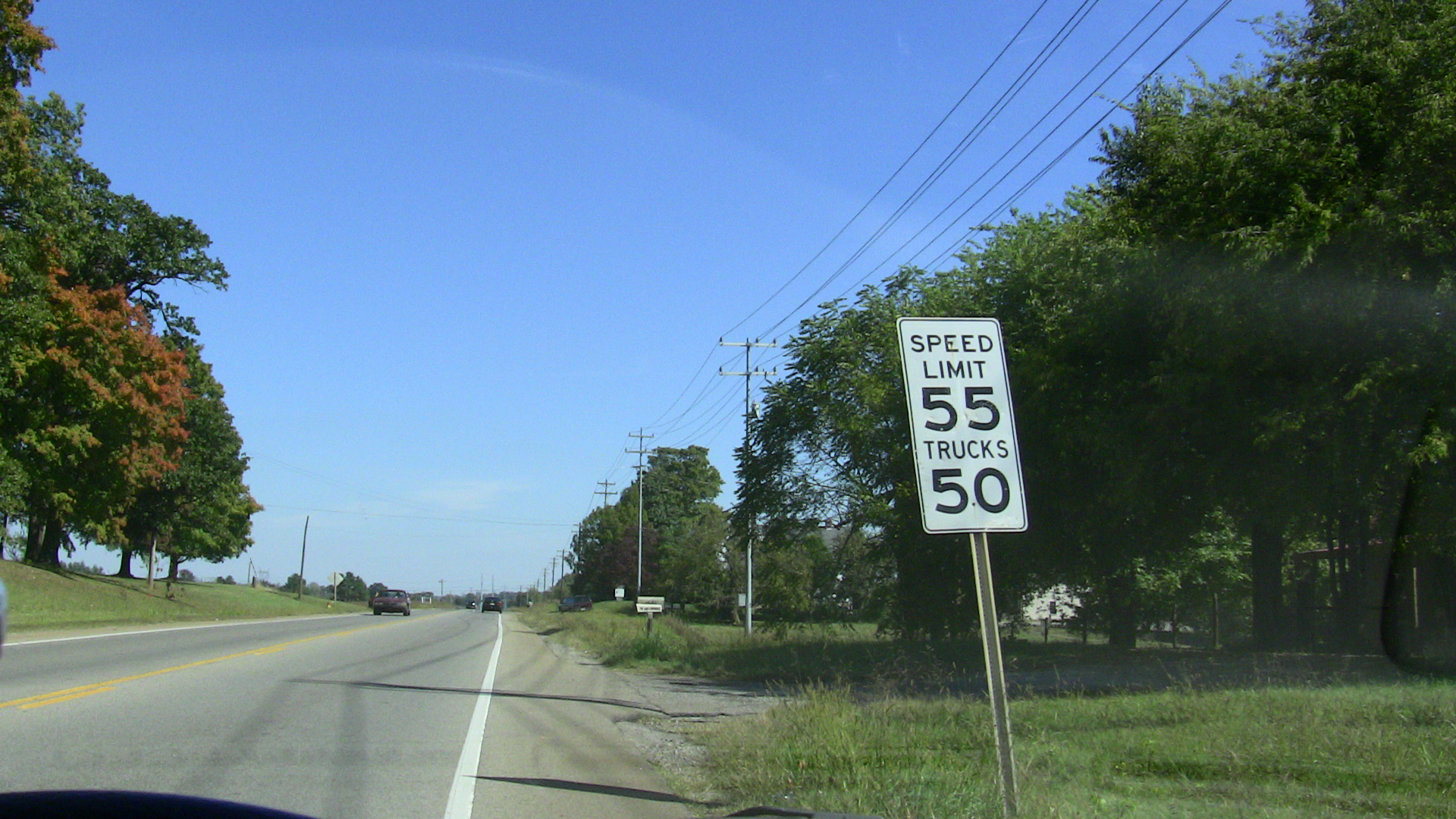
US 79 (Guthrie Highway) north of Clarksville

Once US 79 enters Stewart County, it passes to the south of the Land Between the Lakes recreation area and crosses the Cumberland River. The portion between the rivers is known as Donelson Parkway. Then it enters Montgomery County and the city of Clarksville. This portion between Dover and Clarksville is known as Dover Road. Once through Clarksville, US 79 continues northeast and enters Kentucky.

Wilma Rudolph Boulevard is the name given to the portion of US 79 in Clarksville between the Interstate 24 (exit 4) in Clarksville to the Red River (Lynnwood-Tarpley) bridge near the Kraft Street intersection. This section of US 79 in Clarksville was previously called the Guthrie Highway, for nearby Guthrie, Kentucky, but in 1994, the name was changed to honor Wilma Rudolph, an Olympic runner from Clarksville, who won three gold medals in the 1960 Rome Summer Olympic Games.

Between Clarksville and Dover, the road is known as "Dover Road".

=== Kentucky ===
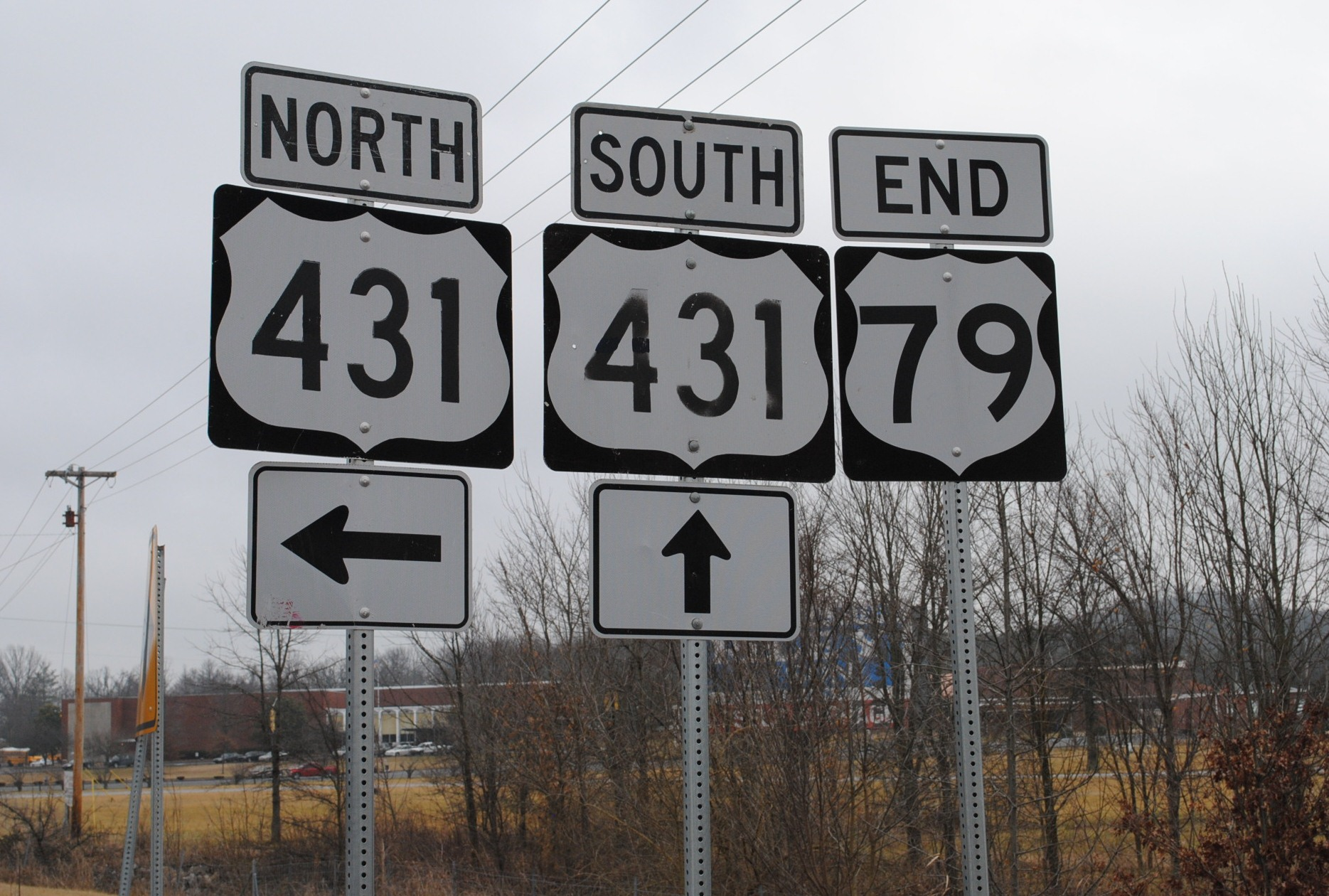
Former terminus of US 79 at Russellville

US 79 enters Kentucky from Tennessee in Todd County west of Guthrie and runs northeast into Logan County, now terminating at the junction of US 68 on the east side of Russellville on its bypass around the south side, 26.8 miles (43.1 km) from the Tennessee state line, after formerly terminating at a junction with US 431 in Russellville. It currently does not touch KY 79, whose southern terminus is at Russellville. That highway extends northward to the Ohio River, into Indiana. It is unknown if KY 79 was meant to be a northern extension of US 79.

== History ==
Approved in 1937 by the Kentucky legislature, US 79 played a key role in the early development of Western Kentucky. It also helped with commerce and trade between Tennessee, Texas, and as previously stated, Kentucky. Until 1944, US 79's northern terminus was in West Memphis, Arkansas. Until 1991, US 79's southern terminus was in Austin, Texas.

== Major intersections ==
Texas
I-35 in Round Rock
US 77 in Rockdale
US 190 in Milano. The highways travel concurrently to Hearne.
I-45 in Buffalo
US 84 northeast of Oakwood. The highways travel concurrently to Palestine.
US 287 in Palestine
US 69 in Jacksonville
US 259 in Henderson. The highways travel concurrently through Henderson.
Future I-369 / US 59 north of Carthage. The highways travel concurrently to Carthage.
Louisiana
US 80 in Greenwood. The highways travel concurrently to Minden.
I-20 in Greenwood
US 171 in Shreveport
I-20 in Shreveport
US 71 in Shreveport
I-220 in Bossier City
US 371 in Dixie Inn
Arkansas
US 82 in Magnolia. The highways travel concurrently through Magnolia.
US 278 in Camden. The highways travel concurrently to west-northwest of East Camden.
US 167 northeast of Thornton. The highways travel concurrently to Fordyce.
I-530 / US 65 in Pine Bluff. The highways travel concurrently through Pine Bluff.
US 63 in Pine Bluff. The highways travel concurrently to Stuttgart.
I-530 / US 65 / US 425 in Pine Bluff
US 165 north of Stuttgart
US 49 northwest of Blackton
US 70 south of Jennette
I-40 south of Jennette. The highways travel concurrently to West Memphis.
I-55 / US 61 / US 64 in West Memphis. I-55/US 61/US 79 travels concurrently to Memphis, Tennessee. US 64/US 79 travels concurrently to the Memphis–Bartlett, Tennessee city line.
US 70 in West Memphis. The highways travel concurrently to Brownsville, Tennessee.
Tennessee
US 51 in Memphis. The highways travel concurrently through Memphis.
I-69 / I-240 in Memphis
US 51 / US 72 in Memphis. US 72/US 79 travels concurrently through Memphis.
I-40 in Memphis
I-269 in Arlington
US 412 in Bells
US 45W in Humboldt
US 45E in Milan
US 641 in Paris
I-24 in Clarksville
Kentucky
US 41 in Guthrie
US 431 in Russellville
US 68 in Russellville

== See also ==
=== Special and suffixed routes ===
- U.S. Route 79 Bypass in Homer, Louisiana
- U.S. Route 79 Bypass in Humboldt, Tennessee
- U.S. Route 79 Business in Pine Bluff, Arkansas
- U.S. Route 79 Business in Stuttgart, Arkansas
- U.S. Route 79 Business in Altheimer, Arkansas
- U.S. Route 79 Business in Fordyce, Arkansas
- U.S. Route 79 Business in Magnolia, Arkansas
- U.S. Route 79 Business in Camden, Arkansas
- U.S. Route 79 Business in Bearden, Arkansas
- U.S. Route 79 Business in Camden, Arkansas

Browse numbered routes
← SH 78	TX	→ SH 79
← LA 78	LA	→ US 80
← AR 78	AR	→ AR 80
← SR 78	TN	→ SR 79
← KY 78	list	→ KY 79
