= Calhoun, Louisiana =

- Census-designated place
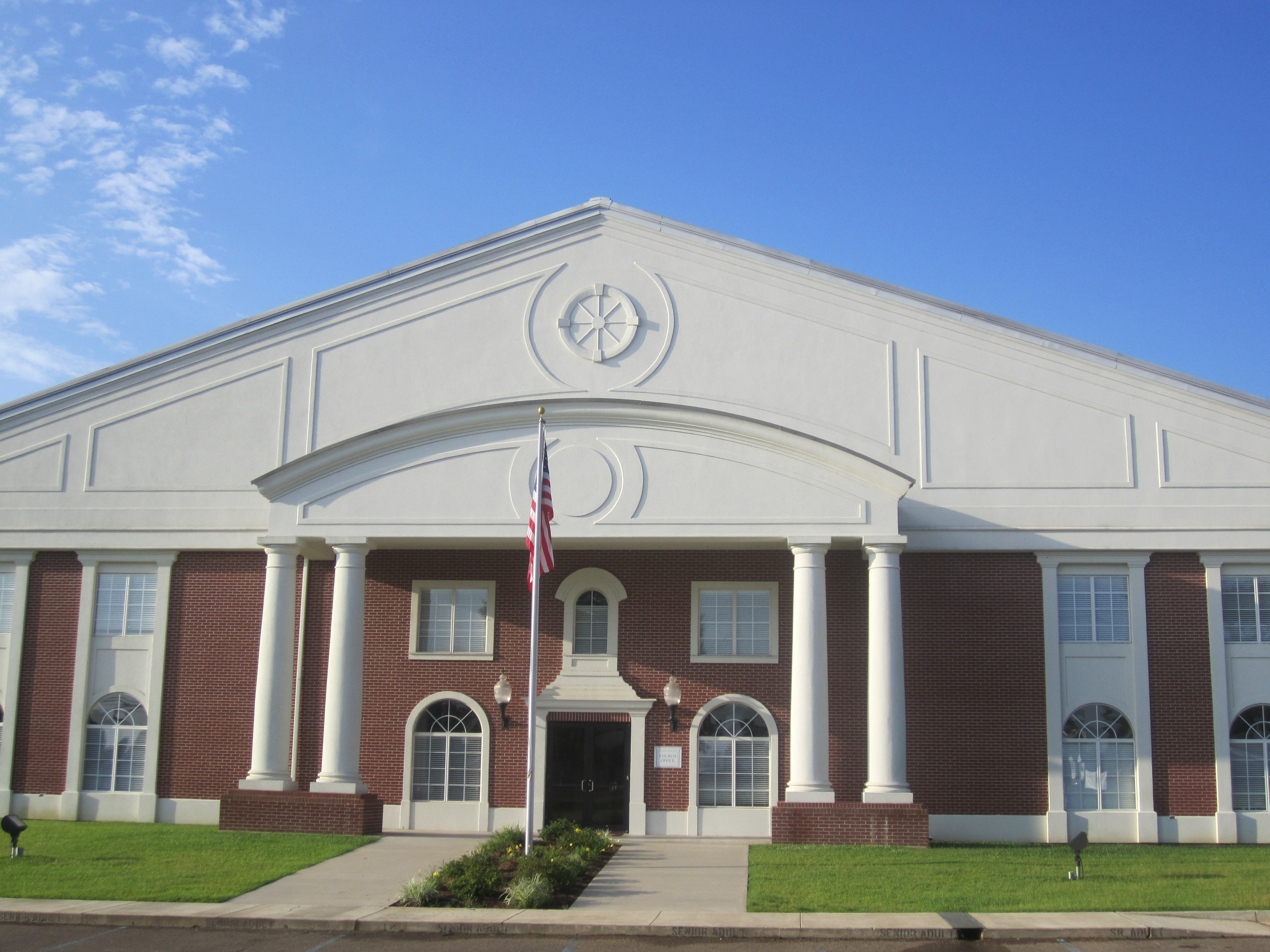
- First Baptist Church of Calhoun

- Location of Calhoun in Ouachita Parish, Louisiana.
- Coordinates: 32°30′57″N 92°21′55″W
- Country: United States
- State: Louisiana
- Parish: Ouachita

Area
  - Total: 2.36 sq mi (6.12 km^{2})
  - Land: 2.36 sq mi (6.12 km^{2})
  - Water: 0 sq mi (0.00 km^{2})
- Elevation: 164 ft (50 m)

Population (2020)
  - Total: 670
  - Density: 283.7/sq mi (109.54/km^{2})
- Time zone: UTC-6 (Central (CST))
  - Summer (DST): UTC-5 (CDT)
- ZIP code: 71225
- Area code: 318
- FIPS code: 22-11825
- GNIS feature ID: 2583532

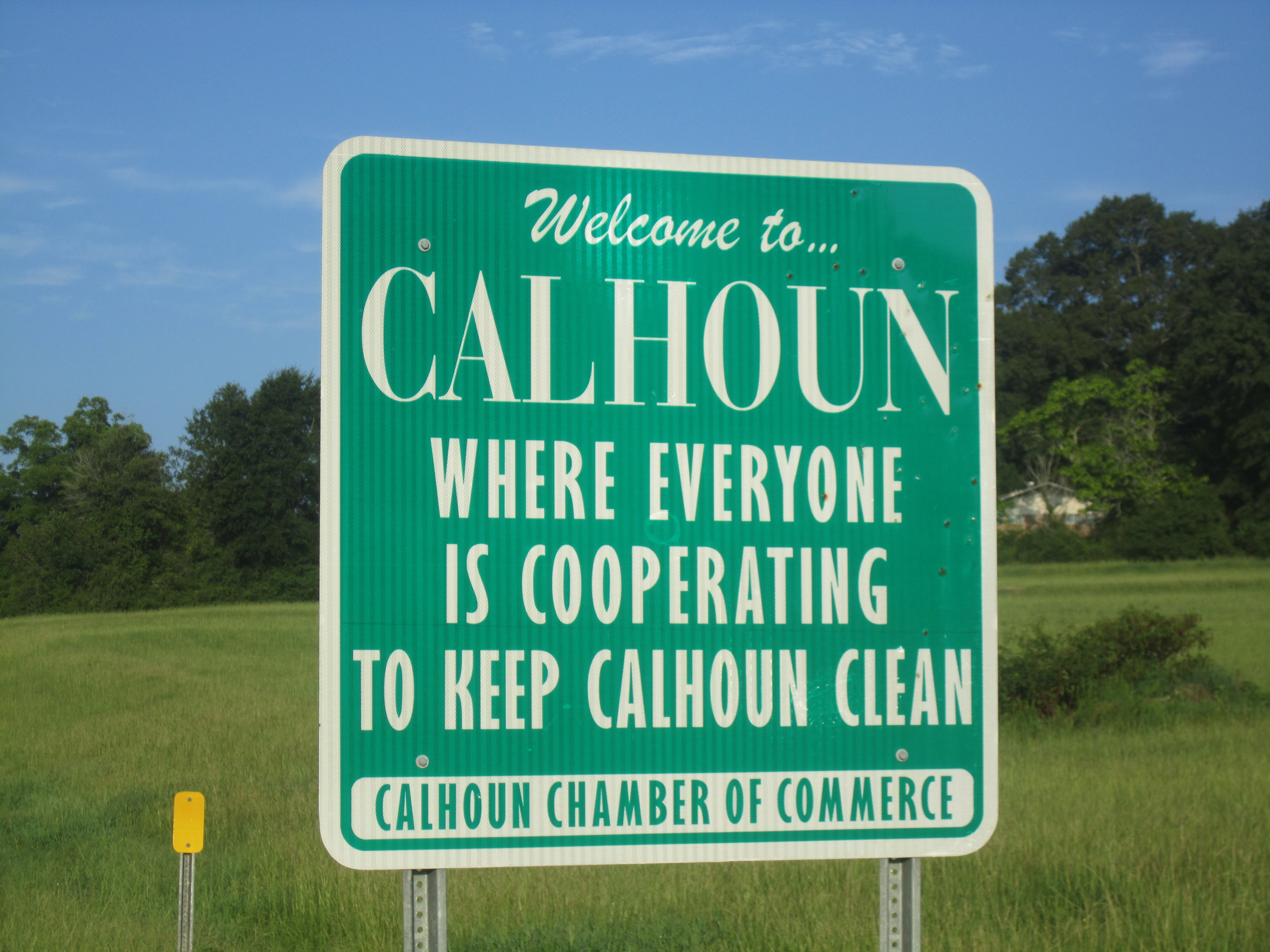
Calhoun welcome sign

Calhoun is an unincorporated community and census-designated place in Ouachita Parish, Louisiana, United States. It is named after Archibald Calhoun, who was an original settler and landowner. Calhoun is unincorporated (no local government) and is governed by the parish through a board of commissioners known as the Police Jury.

As of the 2020 census, Calhoun had a population of 670.

Calhoun is located in a rural area with a landscape mixture of hills and woodlands on the former transcontinental route U.S. 80 near Interstate 20, approximately 10 miles west of West Monroe.

== Demographics ==
Historical population
Census	Pop.	Note	%±
2010	679		—
2020	670		−1.3%
U.S. Decennial Census

Calhoun first appeared as a census designated place in the 2010 U.S. census.

=== 2020 census ===
Calhoun racial composition
Race	Number	Percentage
White (non-Hispanic)	569	84.93%
Black or African American (non-Hispanic)	40	5.97%
Native American	4	0.6%
Asian	2	0.3%
Other/Mixed	30	4.48%
Hispanic or Latino	25	3.73%

As of the 2020 United States census, there were 670 people, 135 households, and 121 families residing in the CDP.

== Climate ==
According to the Köppen Climate Classification system, Calhoun has a humid subtropical climate, abbreviated "Cfa" on climate maps. The hottest temperature recorded in Calhoun was 110 °F (43.3 °C) on August 18, 1909 and September 1, 2000, while the coldest temperature recorded was −13 °F (−25.0 °C) in February 1899.

Climate data for Calhoun, Louisiana, 1991–2020 normals, extremes 1892–2022
Month	Jan	Feb	Mar	Apr	May	Jun	Jul	Aug	Sep	Oct	Nov	Dec	Year
Record high °F (°C)	85 (29)	90 (32)	94 (34)	98 (37)	100 (38)	109 (43)	109 (43)	110 (43)	110 (43)	100 (38)	90 (32)	87 (31)	110 (43)
Mean maximum °F (°C)	75.6 (24.2)	78.7 (25.9)	83.9 (28.8)	87.5 (30.8)	91.4 (33.0)	96.2 (35.7)	99.4 (37.4)	100.7 (38.2)	97.2 (36.2)	90.4 (32.4)	82.9 (28.3)	76.7 (24.8)	101.6 (38.7)
Mean daily maximum °F (°C)	56.8 (13.8)	61.1 (16.2)	68.9 (20.5)	76.4 (24.7)	83.4 (28.6)	90.3 (32.4)	93.2 (34.0)	93.6 (34.2)	88.7 (31.5)	78.2 (25.7)	67.2 (19.6)	59.2 (15.1)	76.4 (24.7)
Daily mean °F (°C)	44.8 (7.1)	48.3 (9.1)	56.0 (13.3)	63.2 (17.3)	71.4 (21.9)	78.5 (25.8)	81.6 (27.6)	81.3 (27.4)	75.7 (24.3)	64.0 (17.8)	53.9 (12.2)	46.8 (8.2)	63.8 (17.7)
Mean daily minimum °F (°C)	32.8 (0.4)	35.5 (1.9)	43.0 (6.1)	50.0 (10.0)	59.3 (15.2)	66.7 (19.3)	70.0 (21.1)	69.0 (20.6)	62.7 (17.1)	49.9 (9.9)	40.5 (4.7)	34.5 (1.4)	51.2 (10.6)
Mean minimum °F (°C)	17.6 (−8.0)	22.2 (−5.4)	26.9 (−2.8)	33.9 (1.1)	45.8 (7.7)	57.4 (14.1)	63.8 (17.7)	62.0 (16.7)	47.7 (8.7)	34.8 (1.6)	26.5 (−3.1)	19.5 (−6.9)	14.6 (−9.7)
Record low °F (°C)	−2 (−19)	−13 (−25)	14 (−10)	26 (−3)	34 (1)	45 (7)	52 (11)	44 (7)	36 (2)	24 (−4)	10 (−12)	5 (−15)	−13 (−25)
Average precipitation inches (mm)	5.70 (145)	4.98 (126)	5.47 (139)	5.69 (145)	5.39 (137)	4.36 (111)	4.01 (102)	3.51 (89)	3.58 (91)	4.66 (118)	4.71 (120)	5.50 (140)	57.56 (1,463)
Average snowfall inches (cm)	0.1 (0.25)	0.0 (0.0)	0.0 (0.0)	0.0 (0.0)	0.0 (0.0)	0.0 (0.0)	0.0 (0.0)	0.0 (0.0)	0.0 (0.0)	0.0 (0.0)	0.0 (0.0)	0.0 (0.0)	0.1 (0.25)
Average precipitation days (≥ 0.01 in)	9.3	8.6	9.0	7.4	8.1	8.6	7.7	6.3	6.1	6.8	8.0	8.7	94.6
Average snowy days (≥ 0.1 in)	0.0	0.1	0.0	0.0	0.0	0.0	0.0	0.0	0.0	0.0	0.0	0.1	0.2
Source 1: NOAA
Source 2: National Weather Service (mean maxima/minima 1981–2010)

== Education ==
Ouachita Parish School System is the area school district.

The zoned schools are Calhoun Elementary School (Kindergarten to Grade 2), Central Elementary School (grades 3-5), Calhoun Middle School (grades 6-8), and West Ouachita High School.

== Notable person ==
Former U.S. Representative Newt V. Mills of Louisiana was born in Calhoun.
