= Fillmore, Louisiana =

Populated place in Louisiana, U.S.

Coordinates: 32°33′47″N 93°30′55″W

Fillmore is a populated place in Bossier Parish, Louisiana, United States.

== History ==
Thomas Dixon Connell built an inn here, The Connell Inn, around 1848, and the settlement was known as "Connell's Cross Road". In 1852, the settlement and post office were renamed "Fillmore", in honor of U.S. President Millard Fillmore.
