= Interstate 220 (Louisiana) =

Highway in Louisiana

Interstate 220
- Joseph D. Waggoner Jr. Memorial Highway; Johnny Wyatt Memorial Highway
- I-220 highlighted in red

Route information
- Auxiliary route of I-20
- Maintained by Louisiana DOTD
- Length: 17.62 mi (28.36 km)
- Existed: 1971–present
- History: 1991 (completed)
- NHS: Entire route

Major junctions
- West end: I-20 / LA 3132 in Shreveport
- I-49 in Shreveport; US 71 in Shreveport; US 79 / US 80 in Bossier City
- East end: I-20 / LA 1267 in Bossier City

Location
- Country: United States
- State: Louisiana
- Parishes: Caddo, Bossier

Highway system
- Interstate Highway System; Main; Auxiliary; Suffixed; Business; Future; Louisiana State Highway System; Interstate; US; State; Scenic
← I-210	→ LA 300

Interstate 220 (I-220) in Louisiana is an east–west bypass route around Shreveport which is in the northwestern corner of the state. It runs 17.62 miles (28.36 km) from I-20 and Louisiana Highway 3132 (LA 3132) in Shreveport to a second interchange with I-20 in Bossier City. The highway serves as a northern bypass of the downtown area for through traffic traveling on I-20, and, with LA 3132, the highway helps to carry through traffic between the two currently disconnected portions of I-49, the area's main north–south route.

== Route description ==
I-220 begins at an interchange with I-20 and LA 3132 near Shreveport Regional Airport in western Shreveport. From here, the highway heads northeast toward and crosses Cross Lake. The highway continues northeast through northern Shreveport, where it has a currently partially opened interchange with I-49. At an interchange with U.S. Route 71 (US 71), the highway curves east before crossing the Red River near Shreveport Downtown Airport. East of the Red River, I-220 enters Bossier City and continues east through its northern areas before curving south at Shed Road. The highway ends at an interchange with I-20 and LA 1267 at the southwest corner of the Louisiana Downs racetrack.

== History ==
Together, I-220 and LA 3132 were both planned together as a full loop of Shreveport. However, because of Barksdale Air Force Base being in the way of the proposed route of the southeast quadrant, the two highways were both split into their respective designations and LA 3132 being truncated.

The first segment of I-220 was completed and signed in 1971, and the entire highway was completed in 1991.

== Future ==
There have been proposals to extend the highway eastward over the Red River and then northward to complete the loop by reaching I-20, but Barksdale Air Force Base is in the way of a direct route to join up with the beginning of I-220. Instead, LaDOT decided to build a connector road to connect the I-20/I-220 interchange in Bossier City to the Barksdale Air Force Base. The connector was seen as a vital way to enter the base without the need to cross railroad tracks, as all the other gates onto the base are intersected by a grade crossing. It was also seen as way to accommodate the growing population in the region. A ground-breaking ceremony for the project was held on May 15, 2019; the official ribbon-cutting ceremony for the completion of the $80.5 million project was held on February 8, 2023. Work on the new Barksdale gate was set to begin immediately afterwards with its completion expected by December 2025. It will be designated as LA 1267.

The I-220 routing is one of five options currently in contention for closing the gap in I-49 in Shreveport. Four of these options involve the construction of a new alignment extending from the existing I-49/I-20 interchange to the I-49/I-220 interchange. This direct connection, known as the Inner-City Connector, is controversial due to its path being projected through a residential neighborhood, which would necessitate the displacement of many of its residents. The fifth option involves routing through traffic via the existing LA 3132 and I-220 alignments after necessary improvements to those highways are carried out.

== Exit list ==
Parish	Location	mi	km	Exit	Destinations	Notes
Caddo	Shreveport	0.0	0.0		LA 3132 east to I-49 south – Alexandria	Continuation east
Caddo	Shreveport	0.0	0.0	1B–C	I-20 – Dallas, Monroe	Signed as exits 1B (west) and 1C (east); I-20 exit 11
Caddo	Shreveport	1.1– 1.5	1.8– 2.4	1A	Jefferson Paige Road	Eastbound to US 79/80 and Shreveport Regional Airport; Jefferson Paige Road is PR 18 (not signed)
Caddo		2.1– 2.6	3.4– 4.2	2	Lakeshore Drive	
Caddo	Shreveport	3.1– 5.0	5.0– 8.0	Bridge over Cross Lake		
Caddo	Shreveport	5.0– 5.4	8.0– 8.7	5	LA 173 (Hilry Huckaby III)	
Caddo	Shreveport	6.5– 7.4	10.5– 11.9	6	I-49 north – Texarkana	Southern terminus and exits 210A-B on I-49
Caddo	Shreveport	7.5– 8.2	12.1– 13.2	7A–B	US 71 / LA 1 (North Market Street)	Signed as exits 7A (south) and 7B (north)
Caddo–Bossier parish line		8.3– 8.9	13.4– 14.3	Bridge over Red River		
Bossier	Bossier City	10.8– 11.3	17.4– 18.2	11	LA 3 (Benton Road)	
Bossier	Bossier City	11.7– 12.3	18.8– 19.8	12	LA 3105 (Airline Drive)	
Bossier	Bossier City	13.6– 14.2	21.9– 22.9	13	Swan Lake Road	
Bossier	Bossier City	14.7– 15.7	23.7– 25.3	15	Shed Road	
Bossier	Bossier City	16.7– 16.9	26.9– 27.2	17A	US 79 / US 80 (East Texas Street)	
Bossier	Bossier City	17.4– 18.0	28.0– 29.0	17B-C	I-20 – Shreveport, Monroe LA 1267 south – Barksdale AFB	Eastern terminus; eastbound exit and westbound entrance; signed as exit 17B to I-20 west and 17C for I-20 east; northern terminus of LA 1267; roadway continues as LA 1267 southbound; I-20 exit 26; I-20 has no access to LA 1267; temporary turbine tri-stack interchange for now.
1.000 mi = 1.609 km; 1.000 km = 0.621 mi: Incomplete access
