= Dixie Inn, Louisiana =

- Village
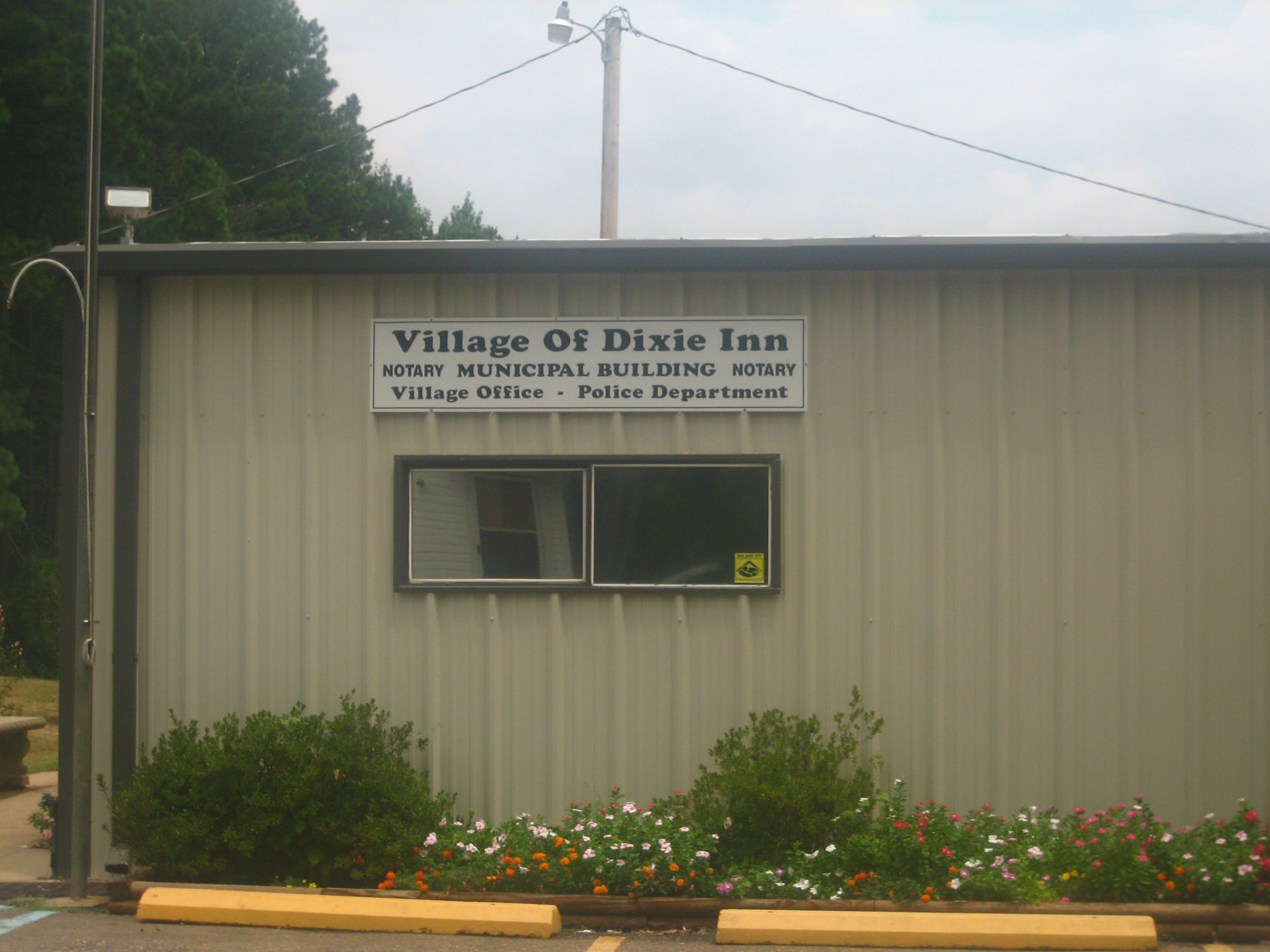
- Dixie Inn Village Hall

- Location of Dixie Inn in Webster Parish, Louisiana.

- Location of Louisiana in the United States
- Coordinates: 32°35′48″N 93°19′55″W
- Country: United States
- State: Louisiana
- Parish: Webster

Area
  - Total: 0.61 sq mi (1.58 km^{2})
  - Land: 0.49 sq mi (1.26 km^{2})
  - Water: 0.12 sq mi (0.32 km^{2})
- Elevation: 141 ft (43 m)

Population (2020)
  - Total: 293
  - Density: 603.9/sq mi (233.18/km^{2})
- Time zone: UTC-6 (CST)
  - Summer (DST): UTC-5 (CDT)
- Area code: 318
- FIPS code: 22-21135
- GNIS feature ID: 2407440
- Website: villageofdixieinn.com

Dixie Inn is a village in Webster Parish, Louisiana, United States. As of the 2020 census, Dixie Inn had a population of 293. It is located off Interstate 20 at the old Shreveport Road, some twenty-six miles east of Shreveport. Minden, the seat of Webster Parish, is located some three miles to the east. Dixie Inn is part of the Minden Micropolitan Statistical Area.

== History ==
Most of the original houses in Dixie Inn were built during World War II to serve munitions workers at the former Louisiana Army Ammunition Plant located off U.S. Highway 80 to the east.

Dixie Inn was incorporated in 1956. Clyde A. Stanley (1910–1959) became the first mayor of the village; he defeated James Whit "Tinker" Volentine (1915–1982) by a vote of 69 to 54. All but seven of the registered voters participated in the election.

== Geography ==
According to the United States Census Bureau, the village has a total area of 0.3 square miles (0.78 km^{2}), all land.

== Demographics ==
Historical population
Census	Pop.	Note	%±
1960	399		—
1970	456		14.3%
1980	453		−0.7%
1990	347		−23.4%
2000	352		1.4%
2010	273		−22.4%
2020	293		7.3%
2025 (est.)	276	▼	−5.8%
U.S. Decennial Census

As of the census of 2000, there were 352 people, 146 households, and 88 families residing in the village. The population density was 1,163.9 inhabitants per square mile (449.4/km^{2}). There were 189 housing units at an average density of 624.9 per square mile (241.3/km^{2}). The racial makeup of the village was 81.25% White, 16.76% African American, 1.14% Native American, 0.28% from other races, and 0.57% from two or more races. Hispanic or Latino of any race were 0.28% of the population.

There were 146 households, out of which 32.9% had children under the age of 18 living with them, 32.2% were married couples living together, 19.2% had a female householder with no husband present, and 39.7% were non-families. 32.2% of all households were made up of individuals, and 13.0% had someone living alone who was 65 years of age or older. The average household size was 2.41 and the average family size was 3.03.

In the village, the population was spread out, with 28.7% under the age of 18, 9.7% from 18 to 24, 31.8% from 25 to 44, 18.2% from 45 to 64, and 11.6% who were 65 years of age or older. The median age was 32 years. For every 100 females, there were 90.3 males. For every 100 females age 18 and over, there were 88.7 males.

The median income for a household in the village was $21,500, and the median income for a family was $19,750. Males had a median income of $28,000 versus $20,500 for females. The per capita income for the village was $12,303. About 27.2% of families and 29.1% of the population were below the poverty line, including 40.5% of those under age 18 and 13.3% of those age 65 or over.

== Government ==
As of January 1, 2017, the mayor was Kay Hallmark-Stratton, elected by a one-vote margin over her predecessor, and three Republican aldermen.
