= Accidents and incidents involving the North American P-51 Mustang =

This is a partial list of accidents and incidents involving the North American P-51 Mustang and its variants. Combat losses are not included except for a very few cases denoted by singular circumstances. Accidents involving Mustang replicas are not included unless they are faithful to the original design and/or built using original parts.

The P-51 Mustang was first flown in 1940, and it went on to become one of the most iconic USAAF fighter aircraft of World War II. The type was rendered obsolete as a fighter with the beginning of the Jet Age, but it continued to serve in the Korean War in the ground attack role. Many P-51s were sold as surplus, becoming a popular mount for air racers.

== 1940s ==
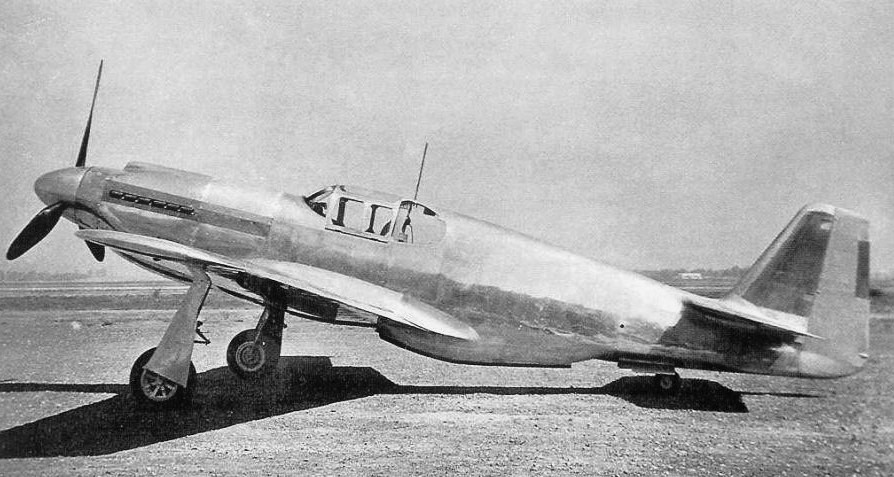
NA-73X NX19998, the first Mustang, as well as the first to crash on 20 November 1940.

20 November 1940
The North American NA-73X (Mustang prototype), NX19998, crashed on its fifth flight after test pilot Paul Balfour neglected to go through the takeoff and flight test procedure with designer Edgar Schmued prior to a high-speed test run, claiming "one airplane was like another." The NA-73X ran out of fuel on its third pass over Mines Field, Los Angeles, California, after Balfour forgot to put the fuel valve on "reserve". Balfour made an emergency landing in a freshly plowed field, but the landing gear dug in and the aircraft flipped over. The aircraft was not rebuilt, and a second NA-73X was used for subsequent testing.

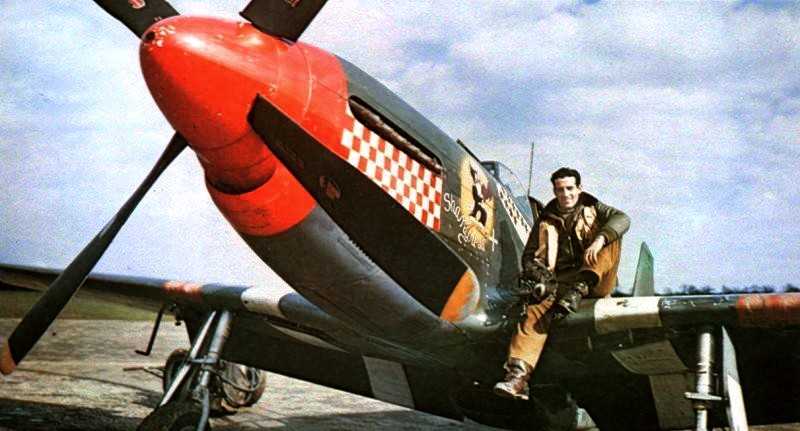
Dominic Gentile on the wing of "Shangri La". He would later crash this aircraft on 13 April 1944.

13 April 1944
North American P-51B-7-NA "Shangri La", 43-6913, crashed after its pilot, famed ace Dominic Salvatore "Don" Gentile, buzzed the 4th Fighter Group's Debden airfield for a group of press reporters and movie cameras. Gentile misjudged his height, and as a result crashed into the rising ground.
20 July 1944
Two North American P-51C-5-NTs, 42-103655 and 42-103728, flown by 2d Lt. John Keane "Jack" Egar and 2d Lt. James R. Cope, respectively, crashed on this date. The fighters, which were stationed at Pinellas Army Air Field, Florida, departed the airfield at 0700 hrs EWT originally for a local gunnery training mission, but instead flew to Jacksonville. At ~0745 hrs, Egar and Cope descended to an altitude of ~75 feet to buzz Egar's childhood home, which they had reportedly done before just two weeks prior. Egar's plane hit two trees and skidded across a street before hitting another tree, several houses, and a line of garages. Cope apparently took evasive action to avoid Egar's plane, but in doing so he himself hit a cluster of trees and flew into a house, resulting in one civilian fatality and a fire that destroyed the house and the house next door. Both Egar and Cope were killed, and three civilians were injured, one seriously. A commemoration of the accident was held at the crash site on 21 July 2012.
26 October 1944
A North American P-51D-15-NA, 44-15669, piloted by WASP pilot Gertrude Tompkins Silver, disappeared while being ferried from Mines Field, Los Angeles, California, to Palm Springs, Florida. A massive search effort was conducted, although it was delayed several days due to a paperwork foul-up, but no trace of Silver or the aircraft were found. That day, a 12 year old Frank Jacobs stood at the end of a pier in Manhattan Beach, California, when he saw a "silver plane" spiral into the sea. Based on his report, another search for the aircraft was conducted in October 2009. Silver is currently the only missing WASP pilot.
9 December 1944
A North American P-51D-15NA, 44-15676, of the 336th AAF Base Unit at Sarasota Army Air Field, Florida, piloted by Flight Officer Herbert W. Bohn suffered an engine failure during a training mission over central Florida. The Aircraft was part of four flights of four airplanes each that took off circa 8:40 AM EST to escort six B-17s on a simulated bombing mission at 26,000 feet. When a member of one of the flights complained of altitude pains, the flight descended to 5,500 feet and turned southwest. About 10 minutes after Flight Officer Bohn switched to his right fuel tank, which had indicated full, the engine stopped without warning. Bohn throttled back and primed the engine, it ran for a few seconds and stopped again. On instructions from his flight leader, the pilot jettisoned the canopy at 3,000 feet and bailed out via the left wing, landing without injury near Sanford, Florida. The plane went down about two miles north in a swamp. No fire was observed as it went in. The Army deemed it irrecoverable, as it was too deep in a swamp.
19 January 1945
A Royal Air Force North American Mustang Mk IV, KH648, piloted by Gp. Capt. J. F. X. McKenna, crashed during a familiarization flight over Old Sarum Airfield when the cover of its ammunition box detached at high speed and caused the wing to shed. McKenna was killed in the accident.
6 May 1945
North American P-51D-5-NA "Mine 3 Express", 44-13720, piloted by 1st Lt. Vincent J. Rudnick, was on a local aerobatics and training flight out of Kings Cliffe, Northamptonshire, when Rudnick lost control of the aircraft near Stoke Ferry at the top of a loop. The aircraft went into an irrecoverable spin and Rudnick bailed out before the aircraft hit the ground.
September 1946
Two Mustangs, North American P-51K-10-NT, NX6611 (ex-44-12140), and North American F-6K-15-NT "Full House" ("Race 80"), NX66111 (ex-44-12852) crashed in during the Bendix Trophy air race held in Cleveland, Ohio. NX6611 was subsequently rebuilt, and is in storage with the registration N119VF as of 2012. "Full House" was rebuilt as a Cavalier Mustang, and as of 2002 flies as "Frenesi" (N357FG).
8 May 1947
A North American P-51D-30-NA, 44-74652, piloted by Max J. Christensen, crashed near Cassatt, South Carolina. Firefighters and ambulances responded to the scene, but Christensen was reportedly uninjured.

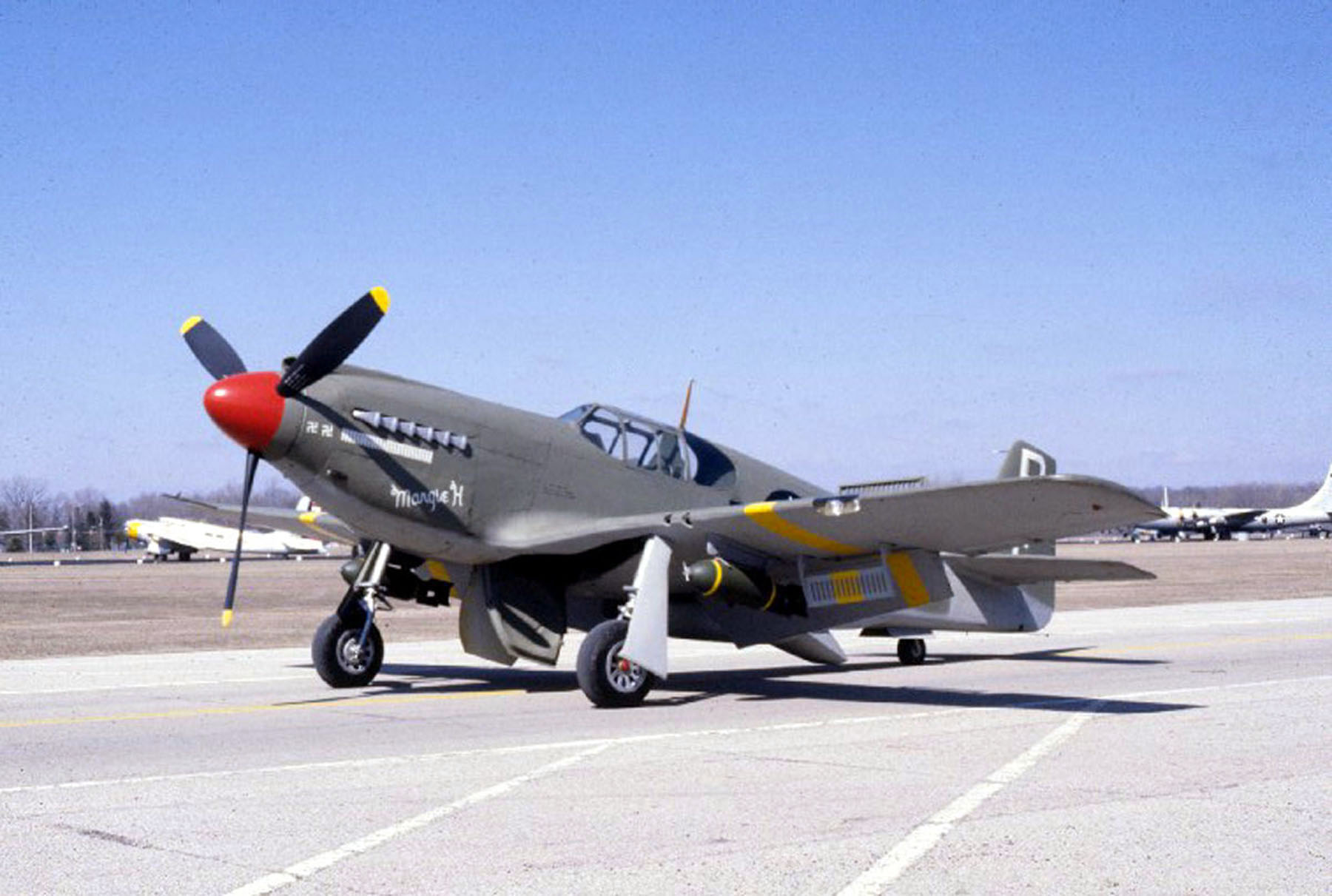
A-36A ex-42-83665, one of the Mustangs that crashed during the 1947 Thompson Trophy, as Margie H in 2006

September 1947
Mustangs were among the many aircraft to crash during the 1947 Thompson Trophy in Cleveland:
- North American A-36A "City of Lynchburg II" ("Race 15"), NX39502 (ex-42-83665), piloted by Woody Edmundson, suffered an engine explosion on the eleventh lap. Edmondson survived, but was knocked unconscious during the crash. Later rebuilt, currently on display at the National Museum of the United States Air Force as "Margie H".
- North American A-36A, NX4E (ex-42-83769), blew its engine in flight. Pilot bailed out uninjured.
- North American P-51C-5-NT "Race 34", NX4E (ex-42-83769) piloted by Jack Hardwick, suffered an engine explosion and crashed on the first lap. Hardwick was uninjured.
- North American P-51D "Jay Dee" ("Race 37"), N37492, piloted by Paul Penrose, suffered an oil leak and crashed on the eleventh lap, injuring Penrose.
21 November 1947
An F-51 (Note: The designation system for fighter aircraft was changed in September 1947 from "P" for pursuit to "F" for fighter. Depending on the aircraft, surplus aircraft are known by either designation.) piloted by 1st Lt. Jack C. Langston collided with a North American T-6 Texan piloted by 1st Lt. Thomas P. Demos over Williams Field, Arizona. Demos bailed out of his aircraft and was taken to a field hospital, while Langston was uninjured and managed to land his damaged aircraft on the airfield.
2 January 1948
A North American F-51D-25-NT, 45-11535, crashed 40 miles north of Roswell, New Mexico, killing its pilot.
7 January 1948
A North American F-51D-20-NA, 44-63869, piloted by Capt. Thomas F. Mantell Jr., crashed while trying to intercept what Mantell thought was a flying saucer near Franklin, Kentucky, killing Mantell. Witnesses reported that the aircraft "exploded in the air and crashed near Franklin". One explanation for this incident is that the object Mantell tried to intercept was a Skyhook balloon, and that an oxygen system failure caused him to lose consciousness and crash. This incident is notorious among those who study ufology.
9 April 1948
A North American F-51D-30-NA, 44-74913, piloted by Capt. William Robbins, crashed at Eglin AFB, Florida, killing Robbins and ending a six-month fatality-free period at the air base.
29 April 1948
Lt. Ralph Van Kerhove crash landed his F-51 on mud flats 20 miles west of Anchorage, Alaska. The injured Kerhove escaped from his aircraft before it exploded. He was rescued by a helicopter crew and was taken to a hospital at the nearby Fort Richardson.
6 May 1948
Two North American F-51s went missing over Alaska. They were found two days later 90 miles north of Fairbanks, where the pilots, Lts. Grady Morris and Garnett D. Page, had crash landed. Both pilots were uninjured.
13 May 1948
Two North American F-51s collided in mid-air during training exercises over Anchorage, Alaska, killing both pilots. One body was found floating in an oil slick on the water but the other body was not immediately recovered.
17 May 1948
A surplus P-51, piloted by test pilot R. S. Carter, exploded in flight over Newark, California.
20 June 1948
A North American F-51D-20-NA, 44-63700, piloted by 2nd Lt. Richard Ambrose, crashed at Gray Field, Fort Lewis, Washington after a formation flight over Gov. Mon C. Wallgren's reviewing stand during a Governor's Day review. Ambrose died in the accident.
27 June 1948
A North American F-51, piloted by Lt. Raymond L. Mathews, collided with a Douglas B-26 Invader over Blythe, California. Mathews parachuted to safety, as did Lt. Harold A. Bowen, a member of the B-26 crew. The other three B-26 crew members, two of which were identified as 1st Lt. William E. Van Delinder and 2nd Lt. Robert Aiken, died in the accident.
September 1948
North American P-51B-15-NA "Air Power Is Peace Power" ("Race 13"), NX28388 (ex-43-24760), crashed during the 1948 Bendix Trophy. As of 2003, the aircraft is under restoration.

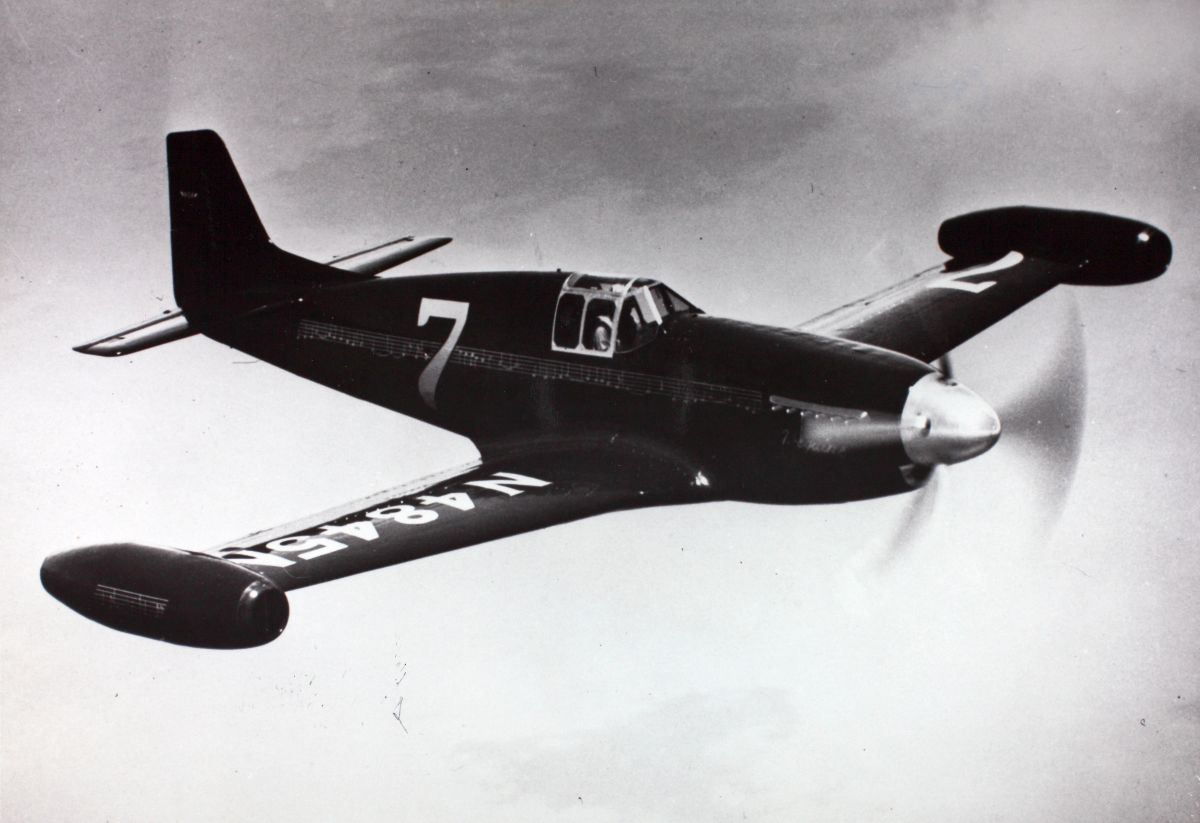
Beguine in flight in 1949

5 September 1949
North American F-6C-5-NT "Beguine" ("Race 7"), NX4845N (ex-42-103757), piloted by Bill Odom, crashed into a house during the 1949 Thompson Trophy. Odom was killed, as were two occupants of the house, Jeanne Laird and her infant son, Gregg. The accident was one of the reasons surplus aircraft did not race in the Thompson Trophy starting in 1951.
11 December 1949
A North American F-51D-25-NT, 45-11353, piloted by 1st Lt. Croston K. Stead, crashed during a mock dogfight during a training mission over Reno Air Force Base, Nevada. Stead was killed in the crash, and in January 1951 the base was renamed Stead Air Force Base in his honor.

== 1950s ==
15 March 1950
A North American F-51D-30-NA, 44-74896, piloted by Lt. Edwin F. Gutt, struck a building after landing at Las Vegas Air Force Base, Nevada.
27 April 1951
A North American F-51D-25-NT, 44-84973, piloted by Lt. Fred Black, collided with a Convair B-36D-25-CF Peacemaker, 49-2658, northeast of Perkins, Oklahoma. Black was killed, as were 13 of the B-36's 17 crew.
15 December 1952
An Israeli Air Force North American TP-51K-10-NT, 2316 (ex-44-12139), reportedly crashed in Israel on this date. The aircraft, which had previously flown as "Race 65" under the civil registration NX40055, was reportedly rebuilt, with its last known civil registration being N357FG. As of 2020 the registration is still valid.
11 October 1953
A North American F-51, piloted by Lt. Frederick H. Reed, crashed in San Pablo Bay, California, killing Reed.
22 December 1953
Two Royal New Zealand Air Force North American P-51D-25-NTs, NZ2404, (ex-45-11493) and NZ2411 (ex-45-11501), piloted by Maxwell Stevens and Richard Westrupp, respectively, crashed when the pilots became disoriented in a cloud and lost control. Both pilots were killed.
6 January 1955
A North American F-51H-10-NA, 44-64638, piloted by Capt. John S. Thompson, crashed following an engine failure over the Sierra Pelona Ridge. Thompson bailed out and the aircraft came down near the Southern Pacific Railroad tracks, east of Soledad Canyon Road.

== 1960s ==
24 August 1961
A North American P-51D-20-NA, N6342T (ex-44-63843), crashed during a test flight in Carberry, Manitoba. The wreckage was subsequently sold.
12 April 1962
A CAC CA-18 Mustang Mk 21, G-ARUK (ex-A68-113), piloted by Ron Flockhart, entered a cloud and crashed into the Dandenong Ranges in Victoria, Australia. Flockhart was killed in the accident.
15 June 1964
A North American P-51D-30-NA, N1451D (ex-44-74446), crashed shortly after takeoff in Durango, Colorado, killing its two occupants.
23 or 28 August 1964
A North American P-51D-25-NA, N8678E (ex-44-73028), stalled and spun out of control, resulting in two fatalities.
1 May 1965
A North American P-51D-20-NA, N6153U (ex-44-63655), crashed on a delivery flight on this date. The aircraft was presumably rebuilt, being registered N5500S as of 1992. The registration is still valid as of 2020.
25 September 1965
A North American P-51D-30-NA, N5151 (ex-44-74994), stalled during a landing approach, resulting in one fatality.
17 February 1966
A North American P-51D-25-NT, N5162N (ex-45-11540), crashed on takeoff following a premature liftoff in Columbia, Missouri, resulting in one serious injury.
17 April 1966
Cavalier Mustang "Race 99", N551D (ex-North American P-51D-25-NT 45-11489), crashed while performing aerobatics in Lincoln, Virginia, resulting in one fatality.
3 September 1967
A North American P-51D-25-NT, N2871D (ex-45-11367), piloted by James L. Ventura, crashed due to bad weather during an air race in Minden, Nebraska, killing Ventura. The dataplate of this aircraft was transferred to P-51D-20-NA N63810 (ex-44-63810), which, as of 2002, flies as "Angels Playmate".
18 November 1967
A North American P-51D-25-NA, N12065 (ex-44-73428), stalled on landing in Brownwood, Texas, resulting in a fire and one fatality.
1968
A North American P-51D-20-NA, N6345T (ex-44-63507), crashed in Brownwood, Texas. The aircraft was subsequently restored, but was destroyed in a fatal crash on 6 September 1997. Parts from this aircraft were also used in the restoration of P-51D-20-NA ex-44-72483, which flies as "Double Trouble Two" as of 2008.
21 April 1968
A North American P-51D-20-NA, N2114 (ex-44-63634), suffered an engine failure and was forced to make a gear up landing in Springfield, Illinois. Both occupants were injured, one seriously.

== 1970s ==
15 February 1970
A Commonwealth Aircraft Corporation CA-18 Mustang Mk 22, VH-DBB (ex-A68-193), piloted by Donald Busch, stalled and crashed after completing a flyover at an airshow in Bendigo, Australia. The aircraft caught fire, killing Busch.
27 June 1970
North American P-51D-20-NA "Race 18", N6518D (ex-44-63872), piloted by Tom J. Kutchinsky, stalled during an airshow performance in Harlingen, Texas, killing Kutchinsky.

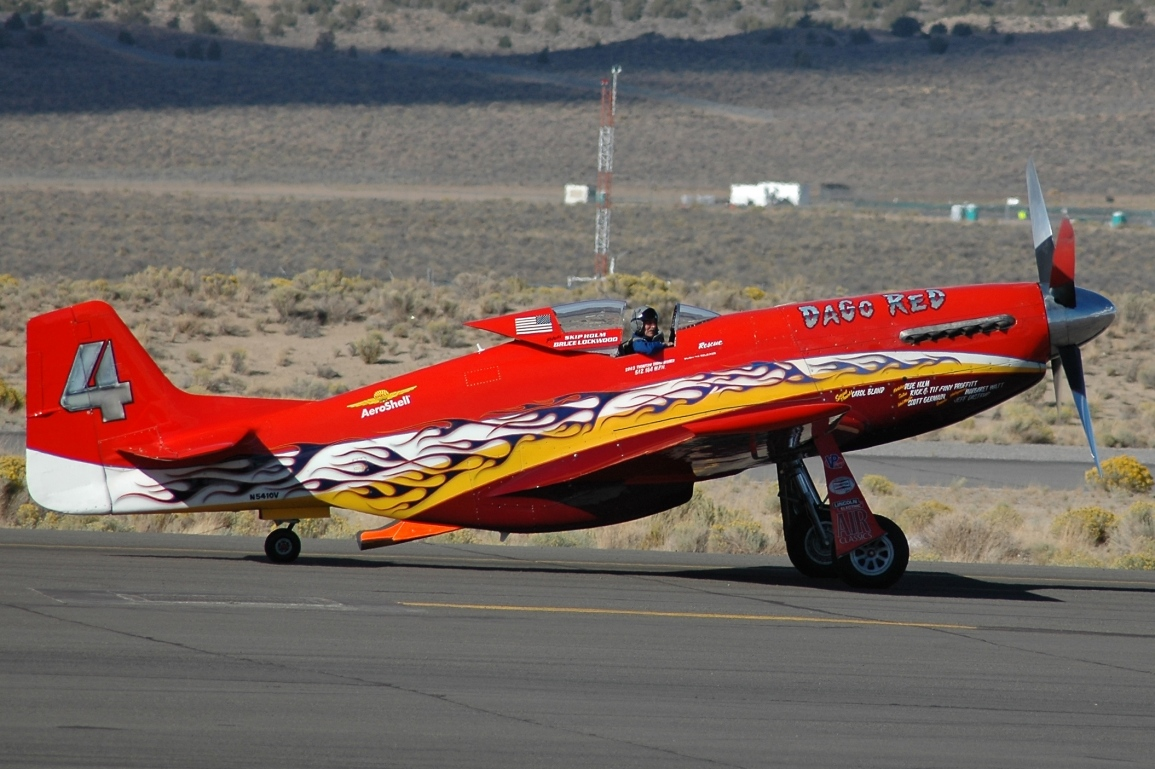
Dago Red (ex-44-74996), the aircraft involved in the 16 August 1970 accident, seen here during the 2004 Reno Air Races.

16 August 1970
A North American P-51D-30-NA, N5410V (ex-44-74996), crashed following an engine failure in Concord, California. Both occupants were injured, one seriously. The aircraft was subsequently rebuilt, and as of 2002 flies as "Dago Red" ("Race 4").
23 October 1970
A North American P-51D-30-NA, N130JT (ex-44-74435), suffered a propeller failure and crashed when the pilot misjudged the emergency landing in Rockport, Texas. Both occupants were seriously injured.
24 March 1971
A North American P-51D-25-NA, N6302T (ex-44-73216), lost power and stalled on takeoff in Hot Springs, Arkansas, resulting in two fatalities. The dataplate of this aircraft was transferred to another P-51D, which later crashed on 26 June 1987.
12 July 1971
The second Piper PA-48 Enforcer, N202PE, crashed of a structural failure in Vero Beach, Florida.
25 August 1971
The left wing of a North American P-51D-30-NA, N511D (ex-44-74950), separated from the aircraft while performing aerobatics near Palmdale, California, resulting in two fatalities. The dataplate of this aircraft was subsequently transferred to a CAC CA-18, which, as of 2011, flies as "Slender, Tender & Tall" (NL51DT).
3 June 1972
A Cavalier Mustang, N6303T (ex-North American P-51D-20-NA 44-63481), piloted by Richard K. Kestle, suffered a structural failure and crashed in Griffin, Georgia, killing Kestle.
20 or 30 December 1972
A Cavalier Mustang, N9149R (ex-North American P-51D-30-NA 44-74441), crashed and was destroyed by a fire in Flowery Branch, Georgia, resulting in two fatalities.
8 April 1973
A North American P-51D-25-NA, N469P (ex-44-73240), was caught in a crosswind and crashed on landing in Atlanta, Georgia, striking 7 parked aircraft and resulting in two fatalities.
17 May 1973
A Cavalier Mustang 2000, N5461V (ex-North American P-51D-25-NA 44-73210), piloted by Kenneth Boomhower, lost power on takeoff and stalled, killing Boomhower. The aircraft was subsequently rebuilt, and as of 2017 flies as Miracle Maker (CF-IKE).
9 June 1973
A North American P-51D-30-NT, N2872D (ex-45-11620), piloted by William Penn Patrick, stalled and crashed, killing Patrick and his passenger, Christian George Hagert.
11 June 1973
A CAC CA-18 Mustang Mk 21, VH-IVI (ex-A68-119), was destroyed in a crash in Sydney, Australia, killing its pilot, Raymond J. Whitebread.
5 or 6 September 1973
A North American P-51D-25-NA, N2116 (ex-44-73990), suffered a coolant pump failure in flight and struck a car while attempting to make an emergency landing on a highway in Yanceyville, North Carolina. The aircraft was subsequently rebuilt and as of 2017 flies as Alabama Rammer Jammer (N51TH).

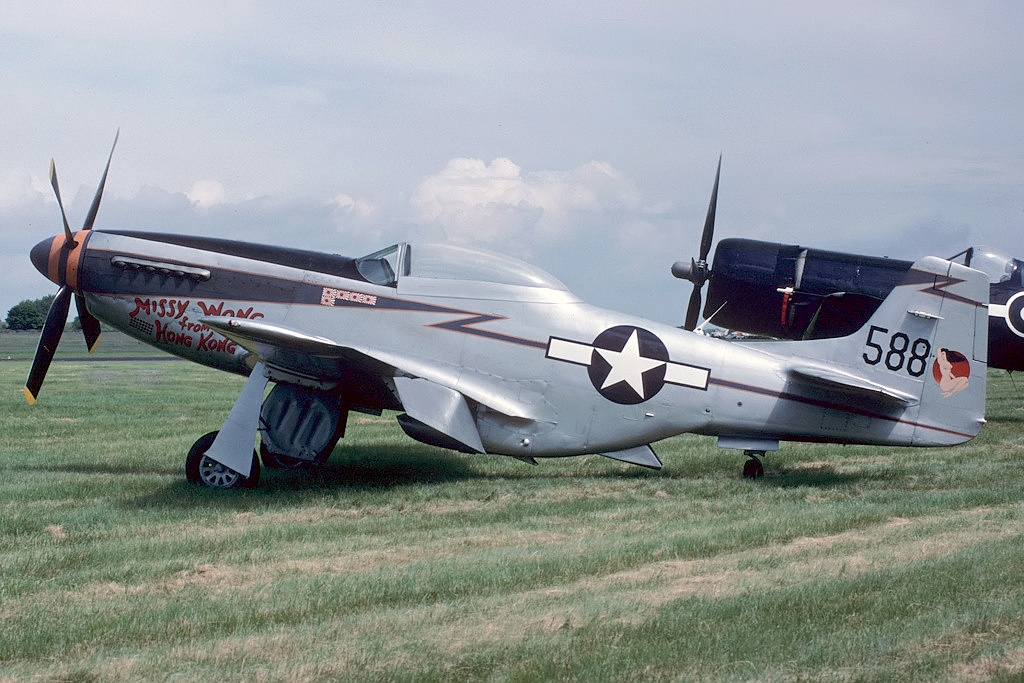
CA-18 Mustang Mk 22 ex-A68-192, the aircraft involved in both the 19 October 1973 crash and the 10 July 2011 mid-air collision, seen here in May 1988 as Missy Wong from Hong Kong for the film Empire of the Sun.

19 October 1973
A CAC CA-18 Mustang Mk 22, PI-C651 (ex-A68-192), crash landed at Manila International Airport in Manila, Philippines. The aircraft was subsequently rebuilt, crashing again on 10 July 2011 after suffering a mid-air collision.
13 October 1974
A North American P-51D-25-NA, N5412V (ex-44-73586), crashed and was destroyed by a fire in Coatesville, Pennsylvania, resulting in one fatality.
17 February 1975
A Cavalier Mustang II of the Indonesian Air Force, piloted by First Lieutenant Effendi, crashed at the end of runway at Branti Airfield, Lampung, Indonesia, killing its pilot. The aircraft crashed shortly after take off on 15.30 UTC+7 for a flight to Halim Perdanakusuma Airbase during "Wibawa" joint exercise.
8 June 1975
A North American P-51D-25-NA, N76AF (ex-44-74008), piloted by John Crumlish, stalled while performing aerobatics in Martha's Vineyard, Connecticut, killing Crumlish. The aircraft's dataplate was subsequently transferred to another P-51D-25-NA, ex-44-73339, which, as of 2004, flies under the registration N510TT.
15 October 1975
Two Mustangs, North American P-51D-25-NA N651D (ex-44-73857), piloted by John Boulton, and P-51D-30-NA CF-USA (ex-44-74850), piloted by Don Plumb, crashed during a thunderstorm in Big Spring, Texas, resulting in three fatalities, including Boulton and Plumb.
6 June 1976
CAC CA-18 Mustang Mk 22 "Miss Zulu", VH-BOZ (ex-A68-199), crashed on takeoff in Bankstown, Australia. The aircraft was subsequently rebuilt, and as of 2019 it flies under the registration VH-URZ.
16 June 1976
North American P-51D-30-NA "Miss Suzy Q" ("Race 33"), N69QF (ex-44-74756), piloted by Ken Burnstine, crashed on final approach to Mojave Airport, fatally injuring Burnstine.
5 July 1976
CAC CA-17 Mustang Mk 20 "Miss Yankee", VH-BOY (ex-A68-39), crashed in Bankstown, Australia. The aircraft was subsequently rebuilt, and as of 2002 it flies under the registration N551D.
21 August 1976
A North American TF-51D-25-NT, N38228 (ex-44-84660), stalled during landing in Big Spring, Texas, resulting in two fatalities.
19 March 1977
A North American P-51D-25-NA, N6526D (ex-44-73415), crashed on takeoff in Olympia, Washington, resulting in two fatalities. The aircraft was subsequently rebuilt, and as of 2012 flies as "Voodoo" ("Race 5", N551VC).

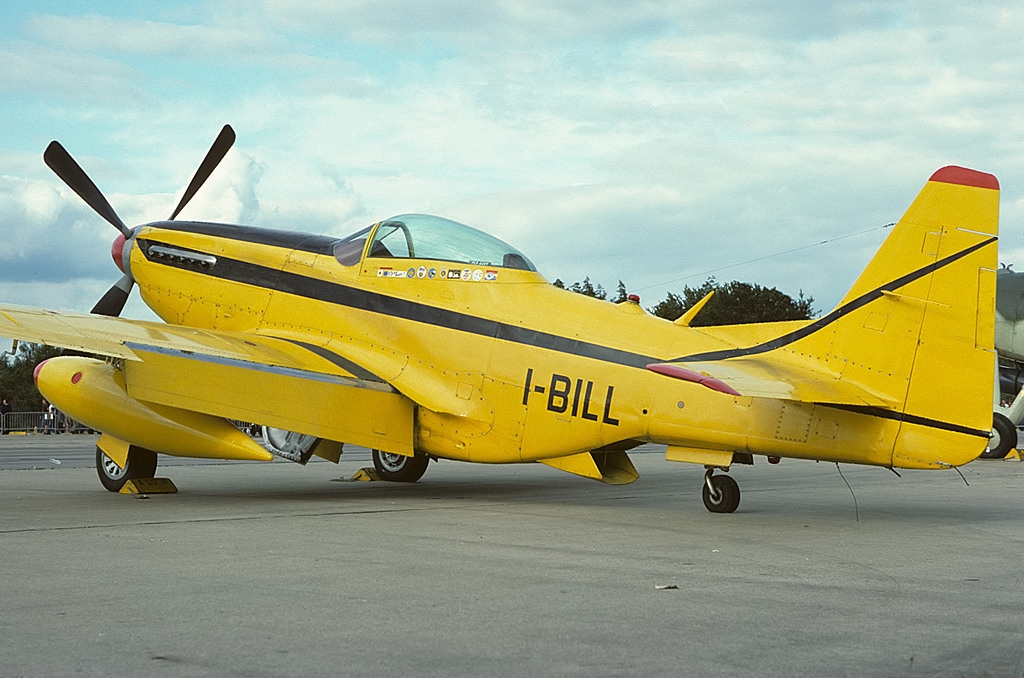
Cavalier Mustang I-BILL (ex-44-74694) at the 1977 Royal International Air Tattoo nine days before its 3 July crash.

3 July 1977
A Cavalier Mustang 2000, I-BILL (ex-North American P-51D-30-NA 44-74694), piloted by Ormond Haydon-Baillie, crashed near Mainz, Germany, killing Haydon-Baillie.
15 February 1978
North American P-51D-25-NA "Color Me Gone", N117E (ex-44-73832), lost power and struck poles on final approach in Ellisville, Mississippi. The pilot escaped without injury, but the aircraft was severely damaged, its wings and most of it tail having been sheared off. The aircraft was subsequently rebuilt, fatally crashing on 21 November 1992, and is under restoration as of 2002.
21 August 1979
North American P-51D-25-NA "Passion Wagon" ("Race 51"), N332 (ex-44-74204), suffered a rudder failure and crashed in Salton City, California, resulting in one fatality. The aircraft was subsequently rebuilt, crashed again on 29 September 1990 and 12 September 1994, and as of 2001 is under restoration.

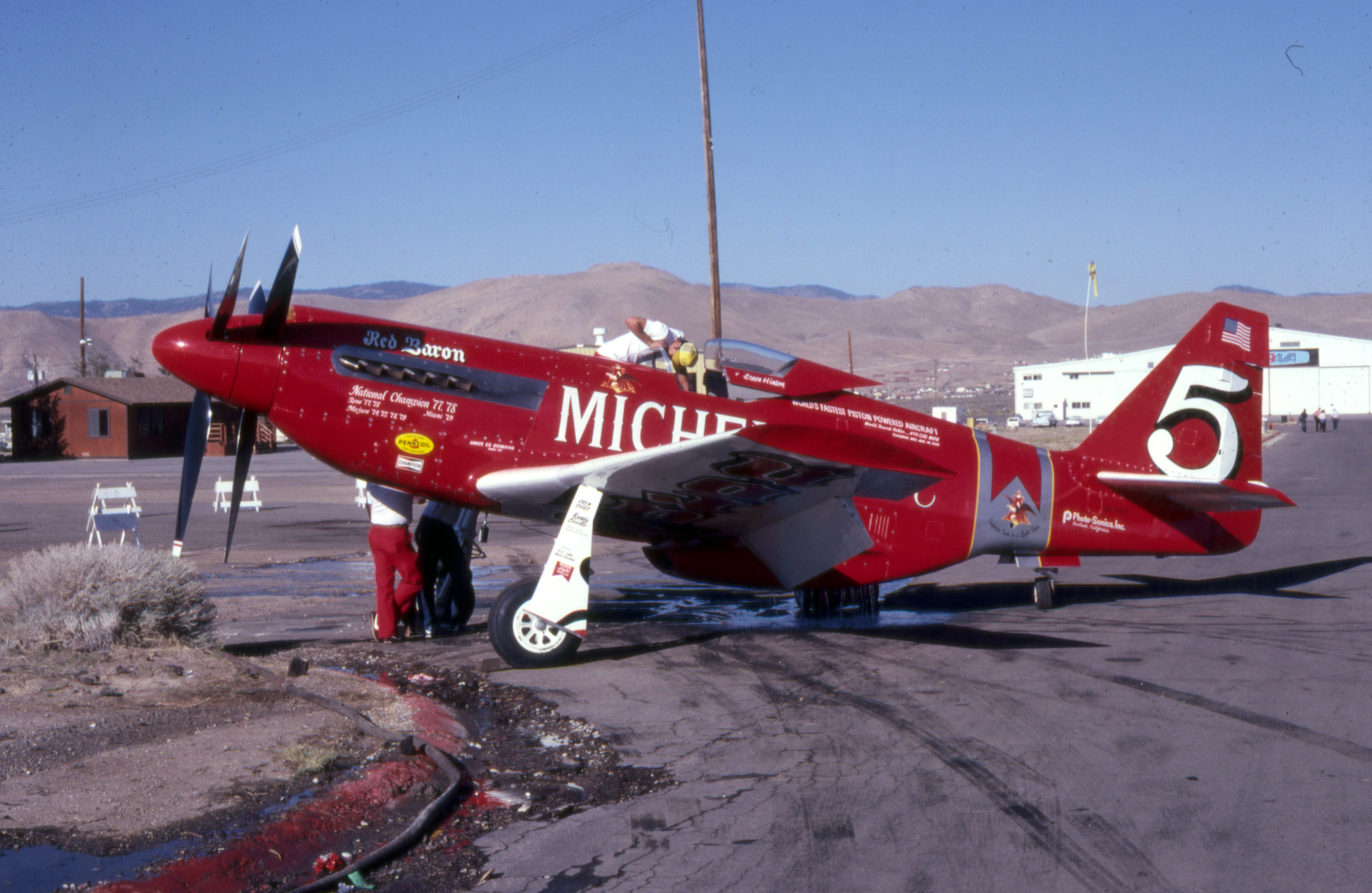
Red Baron (ex-44-84961). Photo taken the day before the 16 September 1979 crash.

16 September 1979
North American P-51D-25-NT "Red Baron" ("Race 5" or "RB-51"), NL7715C (ex-44-84961), piloted by Steve Hinton, crashed during the Reno Air Races, severely injuring Hilton. The aircraft was a heavily modified racing aircraft, powered by a Rolls-Royce Griffon 57 engine driving contra-rotating propellers from an Avro Shackleton. Following the crash, the dataplate of Red Baron was moved to P-51D-25-NA "Wee Willy II" (ex-44-73053).
16 December 1979
A North American P-51D-25-NA, N7711C (ex-44-72936), piloted by John McConnell, crashed while performing low altitude aerobatics in bad weather in Eufaula, Alabama, resulting in two fatalities, including McConnell. The aircraft is under restoration as of 2008.

== 1980s ==
4 October 1980
A Cavalier Mustang, N51MP (ex-North American P-51D-25-NA 44-73027), crashed and was destroyed by a fire in Lancaster, California, resulting in two fatalities. The aircraft was subsequently rebuilt, and crashed again on 11 September 1998.
6 June 1981
A North American P-51D-25-NT, N5471V (ex-45-11381), suffered an engine failure and crashed on final approach in Casper, Wyoming. The aircraft was subsequently rebuilt, crashing again on 6 September 2001, and as of 2012 is in storage awaiting restoration.
11 September 1982
A North American P-51D-30-NT, N51JW (ex-45-11546), piloted by John P. Wright, crashed while performing aerobatics in Elko, Nevada, resulting in two fatalities, including Wright.
15 July 1984
North American P-51D-25-NA "Habu" ("Race 81"), N5449V (ex-44-73196), piloted by Earl Ketchen, crashed while performing aerobatics in Carbondale, Colorado, resulting in two fatalities, including Ketchen. The aircraft was reportedly rebuilt and registered G-CITN in August 2015.
17 November 1984
North American P-51D-25-NA "Late for Dinner", N51JL (ex-44-73849), piloted by Jack N. Levine, crashed after hitting a wire during a low pass in New Haven, Michigan, resulting in two fatalities, including Levine.
26 June 1987
A North American P-51D, N3278D, piloted by Wayne Meylan, crashed after failing to recover from a low-altitude roll in Manistee, Michigan, resulting in two fatalities, including Meylan. The aircraft's dataplate, itself taken from P-51D-25-NA N6302T (ex-44-73216), was reportedly transferred to another P-51D-25-NA (ex-44-73423), which was reported as "scrapped/destroyed" in September 2001.
7 March 1988
A North American P-51D, N51WE, crashed after suffering engine problems in bad weather in State College, Pennsylvania, resulting in one fatality. Some sources list this aircraft as P-51D-5-NT ex-44-11153, but this is in error as that aircraft was shot down over Germany in November 1944.
18 September 1988
World Jet P-51XR "Precious Metal" ("Race 9"), N6WJ, piloted by Don Whittington, blew its engine during the Reno Air Races and was forced to make a belly landing. This aircraft shared its name and race number with P-51D-25-NA N5483V, leading many to believe that it was the same aircraft. This aircraft was newly-built using parts from many different P-51s and a Rolls-Royce Griffon engine, and is the same aircraft that suffered an engine fire while taxiing on 8 September 2015.
2 September 1989
North American P-51D-25-NA "Minute Man", N51MR (ex-44-73163), suffered engine problems and crashed on takeoff in Santa Monica, California. Both occupants were seriously injured.
6 September 1989
A North American P-51D-25-NA, N51VP (ex-44-73142), piloted by Vernon S. Peterson, crashed on takeoff in Denton, Texas, killing Peterson. The aircraft was subsequently restored, and as of 2008 flies as "E Pluribus Unum" (N51GY).

== 1990s ==
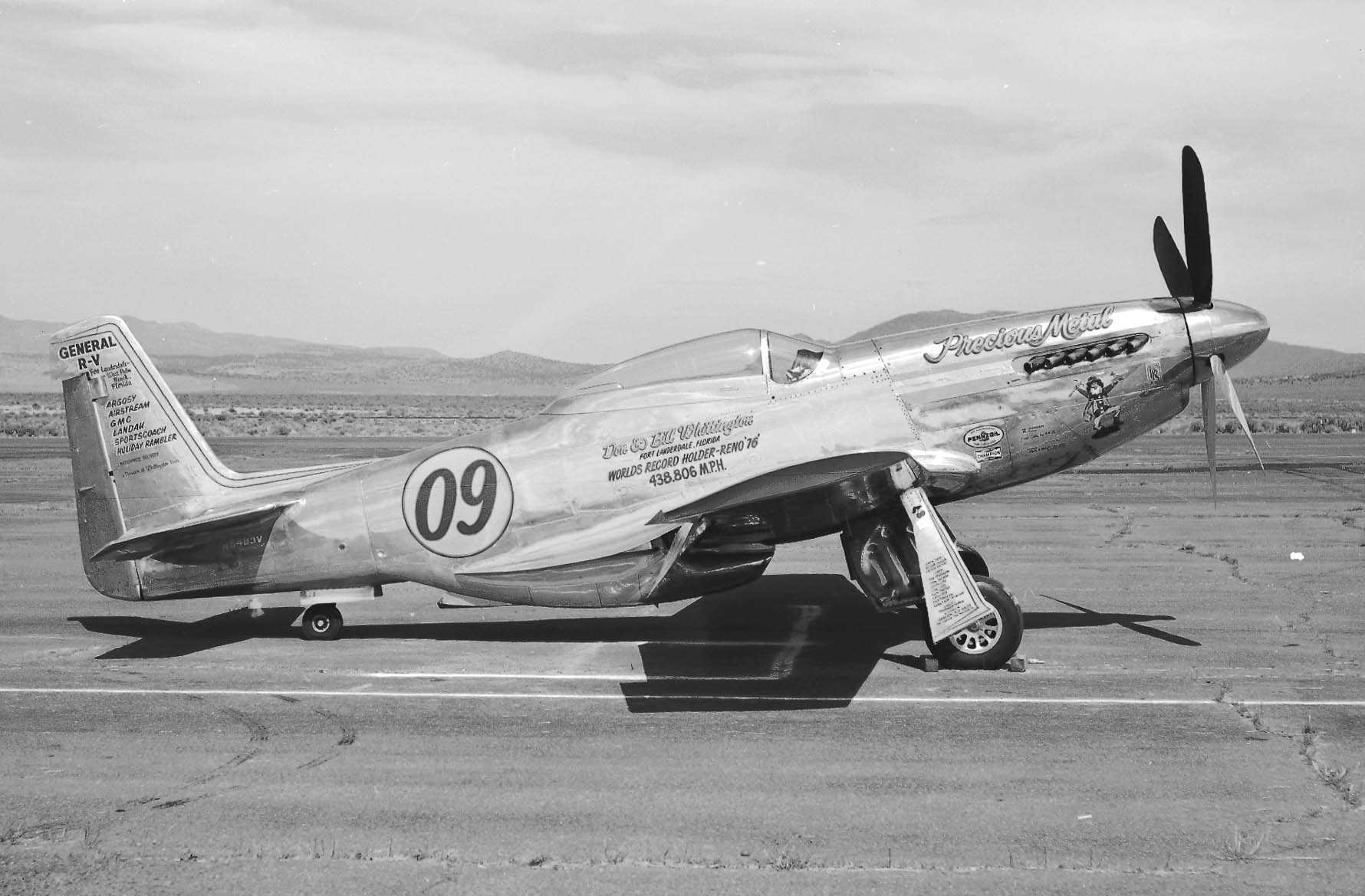
Precious Metal, the aircraft involved in the 24 January 1990 accident, pictured in 1977.

24 January 1990
North American P-51D-25-NA "Precious Metal" ("Race 9"), N5483V (ex-44-73518), ditched in the sea near Galveston, Texas, due to fuel starvation and bad weather, resulting in one severe injury. The aircraft was later salvaged and as of 2018 is under restoration. This is not the same "Precious Metal" as N6WJ, which was newly built in 1987 with a Rolls-Royce Griffon engine.
23 June 1990
A North American P-51D-20-NA, N12700 (ex-44-72446), piloted by Don Knapp, stalled and crashed at an airshow at Dyess AFB in Abilene, Texas, killing Knapp.
1 July 1990
North American P-51D-30-NT "Death Rattler", N51HT (ex-45-11586), crashed at the National Capital Air Show at Ottawa, Ontario, killing its pilot, Harry E. Tope. The aircraft was subsequently rebuilt and as of 2017 flies as "Little Horse" (N51PE).
18 July 1990
North American P-51D-30-NA "Joanne II and Jane", N512ED (ex-44-74600), crashed near Flying Cloud Airport in Hennepin County, Minnesota, resulting in two fatalities.
29 September 1990
North American P-51D-25-NA "Passion Wagon" ("Race 51"), N51U (ex-44-74204), piloted by George Enhorning, crashed in Cape Cod, Massachusetts, killing Enhorning. This aircraft, which previously crashed on 21 August 1979, was subsequently rebuilt before crashing again on 12 September 1994.
21 November 1992
North American P-51D-25-NA "Hurry Home Honey", N117E (ex-44-73832), piloted by Harvey E. Hunewill, crashed in Wellington, Nevada, killing Hunewill. The aircraft was the same as the one that crashed on 15 February 1978, and as of 2002 is under restoration as a TF-51D, registered N151SQ.
5 August 1993
CAC CA-18 Mustang Mk 22 "The Best Years Of Our Lives", F-AZIE (ex-A68-198), suffered an in-flight fire. The aircraft was badly damaged, but returned to the skies the following year. As of 2002, it flies as "Short Fuse Salle" (N286JB).
12 September 1994
North American P-51D-25-NA "Deja Vu" ("Race 56"), N51U (ex-44-74204), piloted by William A. Speer Jr., suffered a propeller failure and crashed during the Reno Air Races, killing Speer. The aircraft, which was also involved in the 21 August 1979 and 29 September 1990 crashes, is under restoration as of 2001.
2 July 1995
North American P-51D-25-NT "Sunny VIII", N51KF (ex-45-11371), piloted by George Krieger, stalled and crashed while formation flying with another P-51 at an airshow in Malone, New York, killing Krieger.
6 September 1997
North American TF-51D-20-NA "Little One III", N973 or N6345T (ex-44-63507), suffered an engine failure and crashed in Monroe, Michigan, resulting in two fatalities. This was the same aircraft that crashed in Brownwood, Texas, in 1968 Some sources claim that, at the time, it flew as "Double Trouble Two" (N51EA), however, this is in error as that aircraft is P-51D-20-NA ex-44-72483, which was previously restored using parts from ex-44-63507.
24 July 1998
A North American P-51D-20-NA, F-AZFI (ex-44-63788), lost control and crashed while performing aerobatics in La Roche-sur-Yon, France, killing both occupants. As of 2009, the aircraft is under restoration.
11 September 1998
A Cavalier Mustang, HB-RCW (ex-North American P-51D-25-NA 44-73027), fatally crashed in Gotthard Pass, Switzerland. This aircraft had previously crashed on 4 October 1980.
18 September 1999
North American/Rogers P-51R "Miss Ashley II" ("Race 38"), N57LR, broke apart in flight after the failure of its empennage during the Reno Air Races, killing pilot Gary Levitz. The aircraft was purpose-built by Bill Rogers specifically for air racing, featuring a P-51 fuselage and vertical stabilizer, newly-built from factory drawings provided by the Smithsonian Institution, the wings and tailplane of a Learjet, and a Rolls-Royce Griffon engine driving contra-rotating propellers.

== 2000s ==
19 September 2000
A Cavalier TF-51D Mustang II, N20TF (ex-67-14866), suffered an engine failure and was damaged in a forced landing in a field in Sugar Land, Texas. The aircraft was subsequently repaired, and as of 2010 flies as "Bum Steer" (N20TF).
6 September 2001
North American P-51D-25-NT "Glamorous Glen III", N551CB (ex-45-11381), suffered an engine failure and crashed in Lincolnton, North Carolina. Both occupants bailed out and parachuted to safety. The aircraft was the same as the one that crashed on 6 June 1981, and as of 2012 is in storage awaiting restoration.
20 February 2003
Cavalier Mustang "Scat VII", N93TF (ex-North American P-51D-25-NA 44-72922), piloted by Jim Shuttleworth, stalled and crashed near Urbana, Indiana, killing Shuttleworth. The aircraft was subsequently rebuilt, and as of 2019 flies under the registration OO-RYL.
29 May 2004
North American P-51C-5-NT "Tuskegee Airmen", NL61429 (ex-42-103645), piloted by Don Hinz, suffered an engine failure and crashed near Bay City, Wisconsin, seriously injuring Hinz, who died in the hospital the next day. The aircraft was subsequently rebuilt, and is airworthy as of 2017.
9 July 2005
North American P-51D-30-NA "Barbara Jean", N10607 (ex-44-74466), piloted by Harry Barr, suffered an engine failure on takeoff and crashed in Tarkio, Missouri, injuring Barr. The aircraft was subsequently rebuilt, and is airworthy as of 2008.
26 July 2005
North American P-51D-30-NA "Donna-Mite", N6327T (ex-44-74417), piloted by Richard P. James, stalled and crashed during EAA AirVenture Oshkosh, killing James.
15 July 2007
North American P-51D-20-NA "Lou IV", N51TK (ex-44-63350), piloted by John McKittrick, lost control and crashed inverted in Camarillo, California, killing McKittrick. The aircraft was subsequently rebuilt, and is airworthy as of 2018.

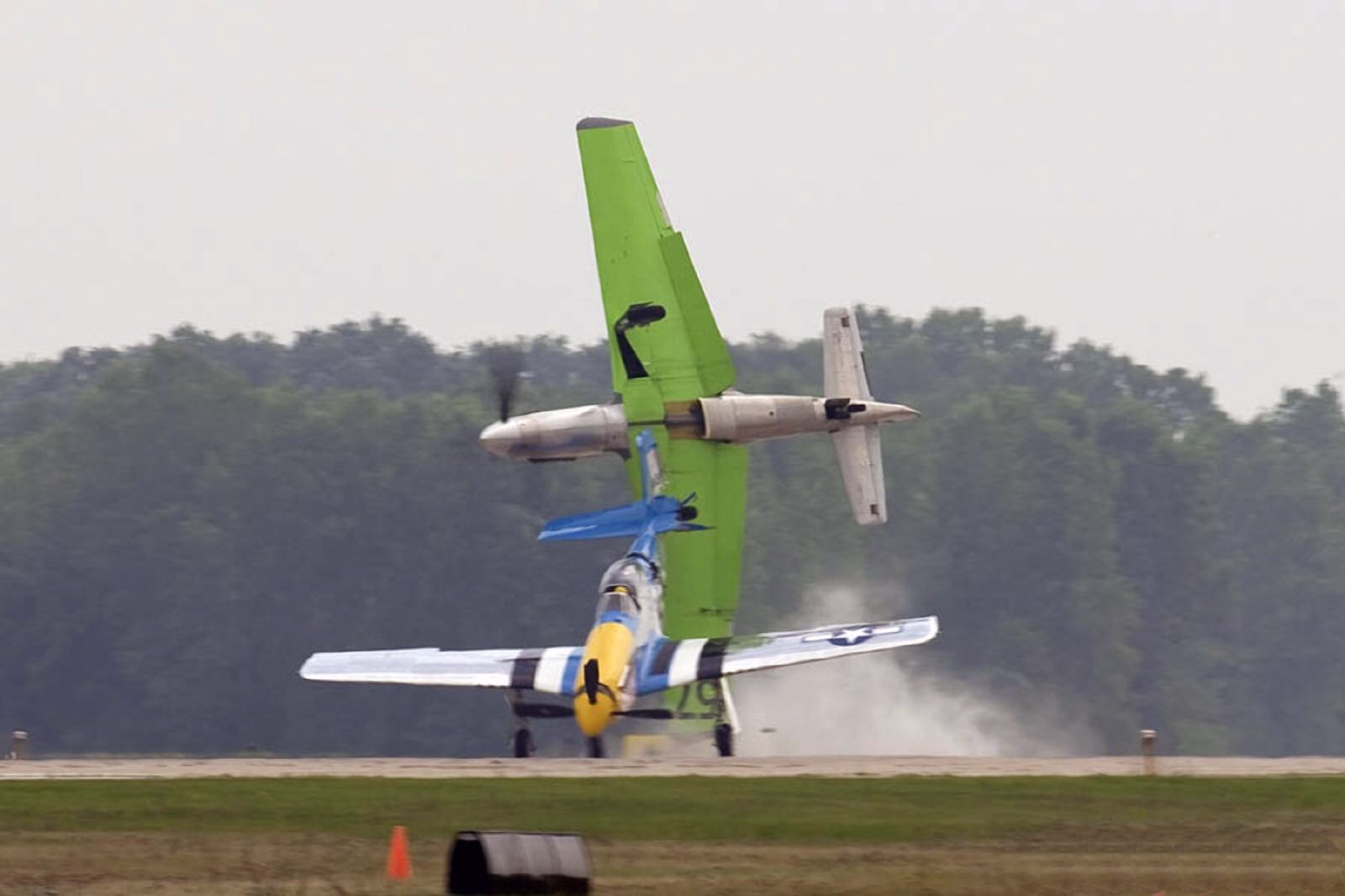
Photo of the 27 July 2007 collision, moments before Precious Metal II (background) impacted the ground inverted.

27 July 2007
Two Mustangs, replica North American/Beck P-51A "Precious Metal II", N8082U, and North American P-51D-30-NA "Stang", N151RJ (ex-44-74404), collided while landing following a simulated air race during EAA AirVenture Oshkosh. Precious Metal II flipped over and impacted the ground inverted, killing its pilot, Gerard S. Beck. Stang nosed over, and its pilot, Casey Odegaard, survived the accident. As of 2010, Precious Metal II is under restoration while Stang has been repaired and is flying.

== 2010s ==
11 March 2010
Cavalier F-51D Mustang "Su Su", N151TH (ex-North American P-51D-25-NT 44-84850), piloted by Nazzi Hirani, lost control on landing and crashed in Chandler, Arizona, killing Hirani. As of 2015 the aircraft is under restoration.
10 July 2011
CAC CA-18 Mustang Mk 22 "Big Beautiful Doll", D-FBBD (ex-A68-192), collided in mid-air with Douglas A-1D Skyraider F-AZDP (ex-Bu. 124143) in Duxford, UK. Rob Davies, the pilot of the Mustang, bailed out, and his aircraft crashed in a nearby field. The pilot of the Skyraider managed to safely land the damaged aircraft, despite losing its right wingtip. This was the same aircraft as the one that crashed on 19 October 1973.

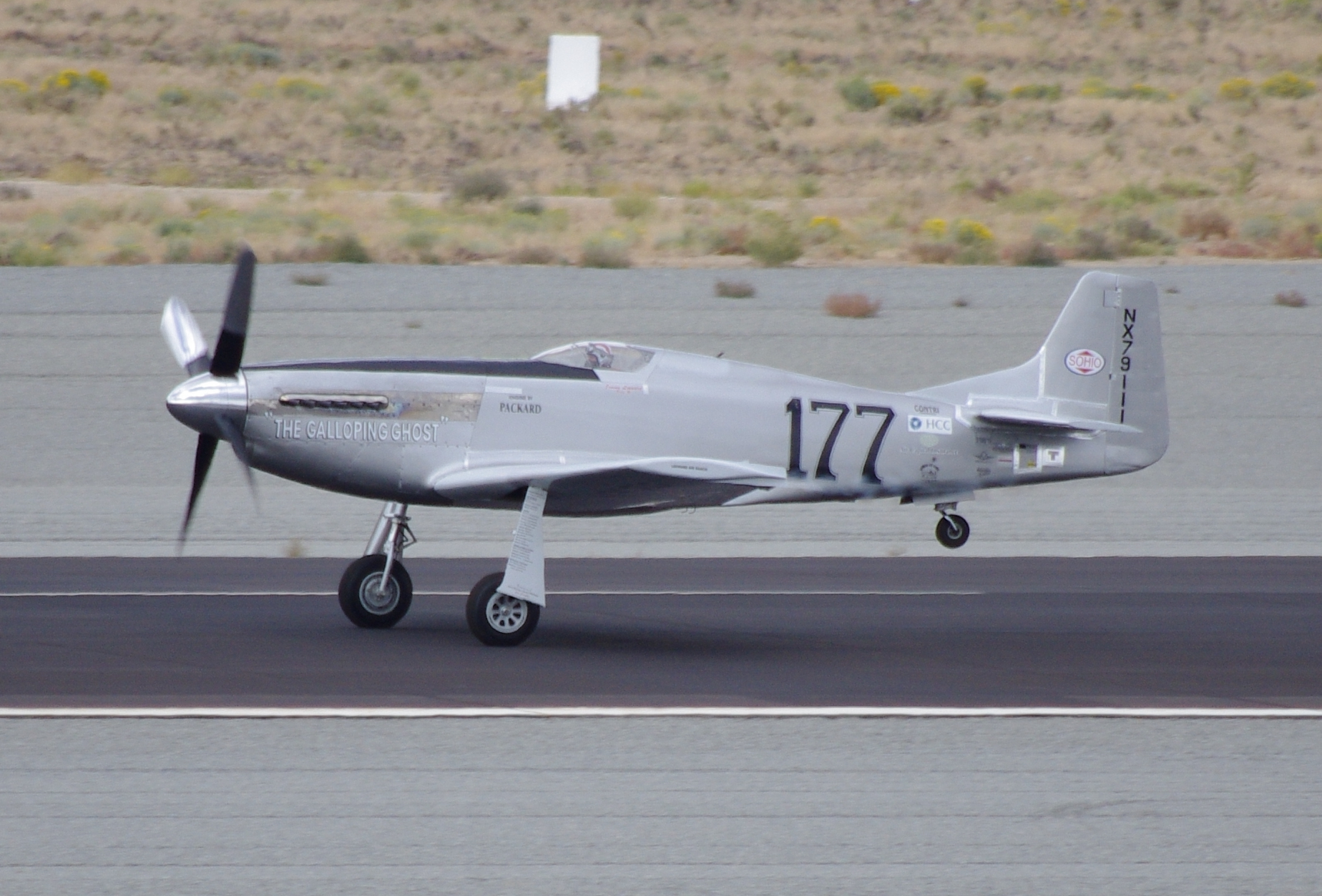
The Galloping Ghost. Photo taken on the day of the crash.

16 September 2011
Modified North American P-51D-15-NA "The Galloping Ghost" ("Race 177"), N79111 (ex-44-15651), piloted by James K. "Jimmy" Leeward, crashed into spectators at the Reno Air Races, killing Leeward and six people on the ground, and injuring 73 more (four of which later died in the hospital). The crash was caused by a structural failure with the left tailplane trim tab, as well as untested and undocumented modifications to the aircraft.
23 October 2013
North American P-51D-25-NA "Galveston Gal", N4151D (ex-44-73458), crashed in Halls Lake near Galveston, Texas, killing both occupants.
4 July 2014
North American P-51D-30-NA "Checkertail Clan", N1451D (ex-44-74446), piloted by John Earley, crashed shortly after takeoff in Durango, Colorado, killing Earley and his passenger, Michael Schlarb. The wreckage was reportedly owned by David Teeters in October 2017.

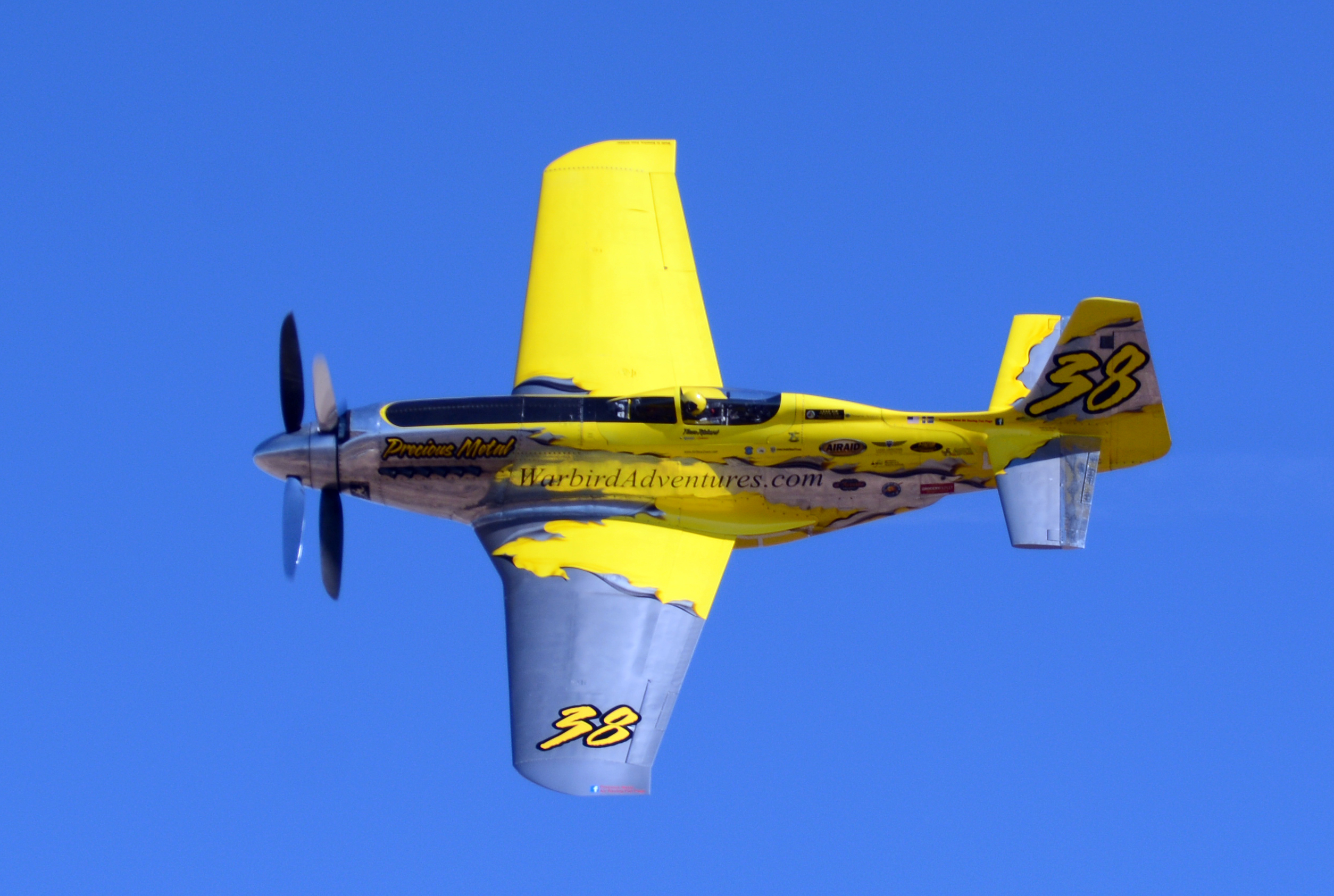
Precious Metal, the aircraft that caught fire on 8 September 2015, during the 2014 Reno Air Races.

8 September 2015
World Jet P-51XR "Precious Metal" ("Race 38"), N6WJ, caught fire while taxiing days before the Reno Air Races. Pilot Thom Richard was able to shut down the engine and escape unharmed, but the aircraft burned for 12 minutes before firefighters arrived, and it took another 20 minutes to put out the flames. Following the accident, Richard announced that Precious Metal would not race again. As of 2017, the aircraft is still under restoration. This is the same aircraft that crashed during the 1988 Reno Air Races.
5 February 2016
North American P-51D "Big Beautiful Doll", N351BD, piloted by Jeffrey Pino, crashed in Maricopa, Arizona, killing Pino and his passenger, Nick Tramontano. The aircraft, assumed but not confirmed to be P-51D-20-NA ex-44-63634, the aircraft involved in the 21 April 1968 crash, is in storage awaiting restoration as of 2020.
2 October 2016
North American P-51D-25-NT "Janie", G-MSTG (ex-45-11518), piloted by Maurice Hammond, was caught in a crosswind during landing, crashed, and caught fire in Norfolk, UK. Hammond was seriously injured in the crash, while his passenger, John Marshall, was killed.

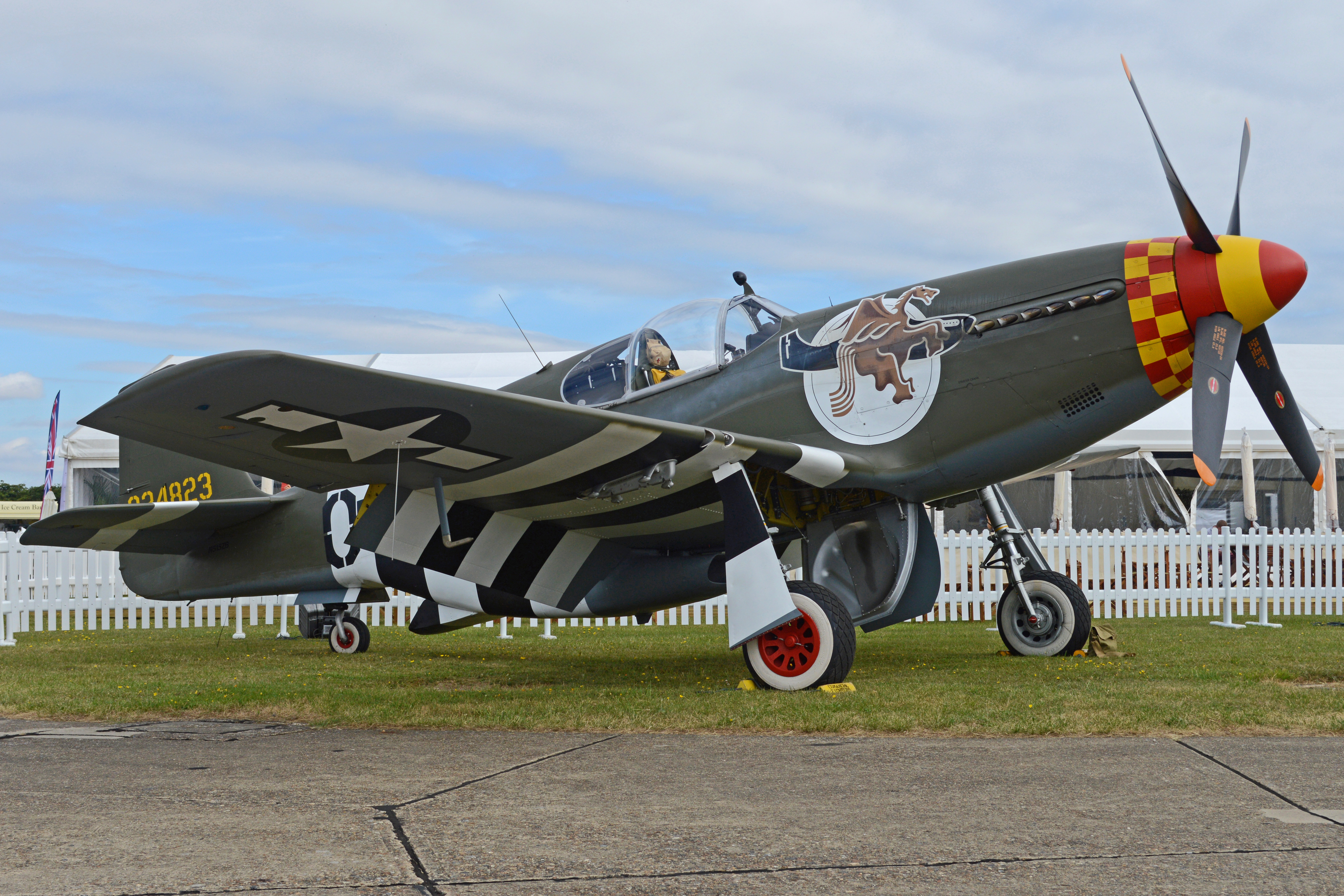
Berlin Express (ex-43-24837) in July 2017.

July 2017
North American P-51B-15-NA "Berlin Express", N5087F (ex-43-24837), suffered a canopy failure during a low pass at the Flying Legends airshow in Duxford, England. The tail surfaces also suffered damage.
July 2017
North American P-51D-25-NT "Miss Velma", G-TFSI (ex-44-84847), suffered an engine failure during the Flying Legends airshow and was forced to make a belly landing.
16 July 2017
North American P-51D-20-NA "Baby Duck", N251PW (ex-44-72086), piloted by Vlado Lenoch, crashed in Atchison County, Kansas, after taking off from Amelia Earhart Airport. Lenoch was killed, as was his passenger, airport manager Bethany Root.
17 November 2018
North American P-51D-30-NA "Pecos Bill", N4132A (ex-44-74445), piloted by Cowden Ward Jr., crashed into a parking lot in Fredericksburg, Texas, after apparent engine troubles, killing Ward and his passenger, WWII veteran Vincent Losada.

== 2020s ==
12 May 2026
North American P-51D-30NA "Charlotte's Chariot II", N251CS (ex-44-74977), piloted by owner Dan Fordice (son of former Governor of Mississippi Kirk Fordice), crashes near Vicksburg–Tallulah Regional Airport in Mound, Louisiana; Fordice is killed in the crash.
