= Fitzhugh Mounds =

Archaeological site in Louisiana, US

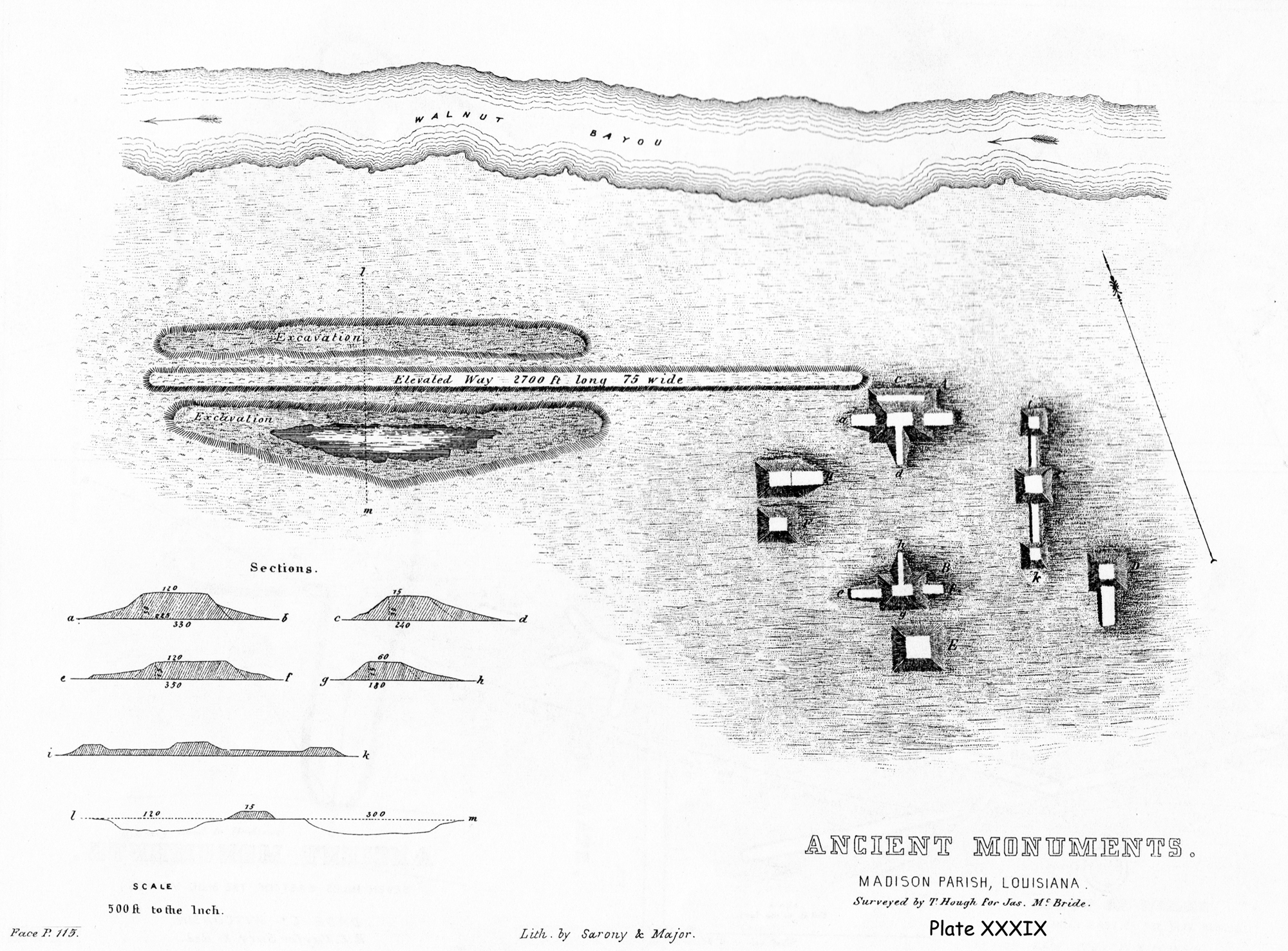
- Plate XXXIX Ancient Works in Madison Parish, La

- Location within Louisiana today
- 32°19′14.6″N 91°4′49.3″W
- Periods: Fitzhugh Phase
- Cultures: Plaquemine culture
- Location: Mound, Louisiana, Madison Parish, Louisiana, United States
- Region: Madison Parish, Louisiana

History
- Built: 700 CE
- Abandoned: 1541

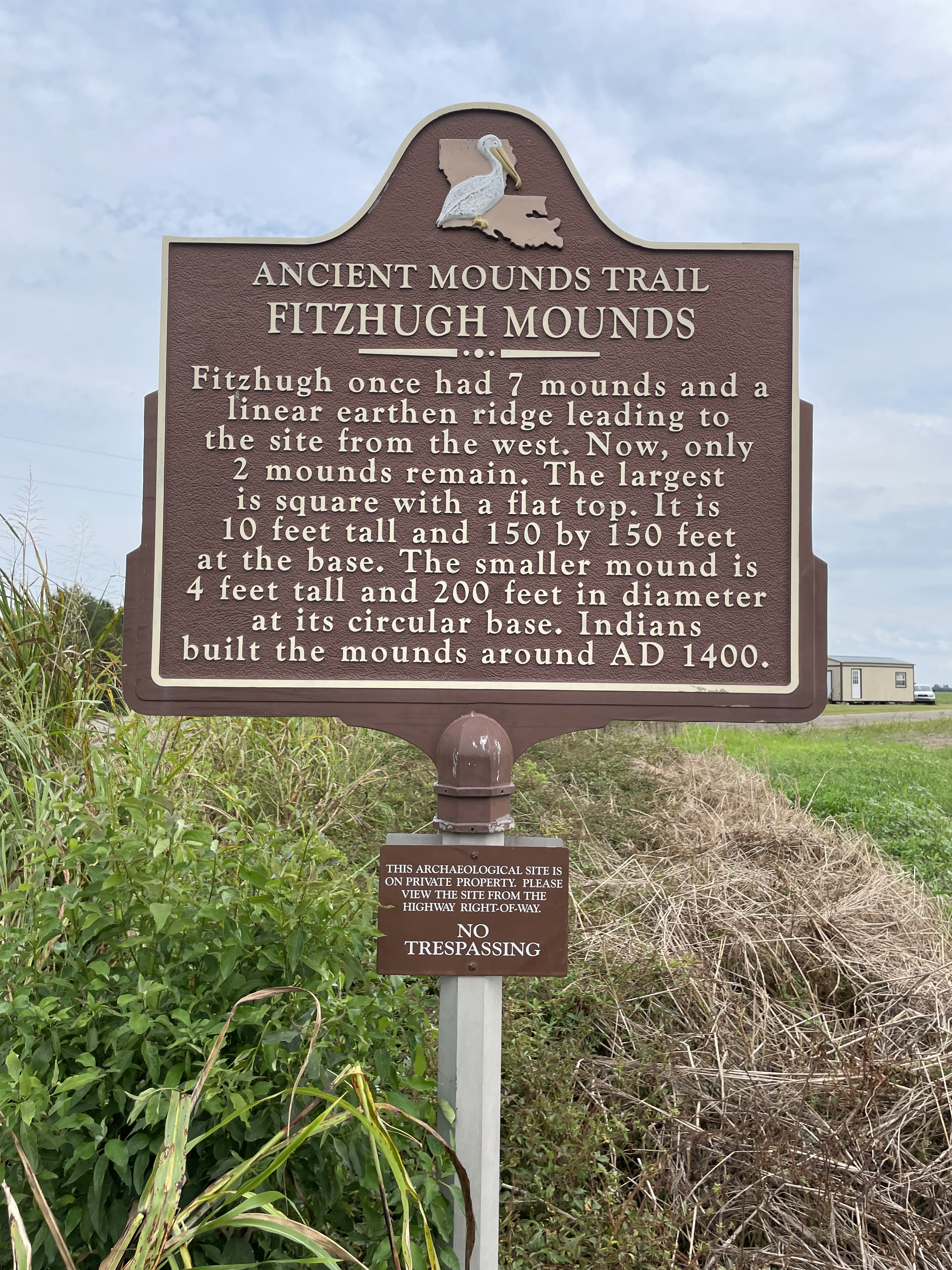
Historic marker for the Fitzhugh Mounds in Madison Parish, Louisiana.

Fitzhugh Mounds is an archaeological site in Madison Parish, Louisiana from the Plaquemine and Mississippian period dating to approximately 1200–1541 CE. It is the type site for the Fitzhugh Phase (1350–1500) of the Tensas Basin Plaquemine Mississippian chronology.

== Description ==
The site was once an impressive seven-mound complex, with four of the platform mounds surrounding a central plaza. The site is first mentioned in E. G. Squier and E. H. Davis' Ancient Monuments of the Mississippi Valley in 1848.

The largest mound at the site, at 30 feet (9.1 m) in height, was bulldozed and carted away to use as fill during the construction of Interstate 20. Other of the mounds have been extensively plowed by local farmers and only two of the original seven mounds remain. Mound B is 10 feet (3.0 m) in height. Mound D serves as an active historic cemetery and is approximately 4 feet (1.2 m) in height.

== Location ==
The site is located on La 602 4 miles (6.4 km) south-southwest of its junction with I-20.

== See also ==
- Schicker Mound: also in Madison Parish
- Culture, phase, and chronological table for the Mississippi Valley
