= Morrow Aircraft Corporation =

- Industry: Aerospace
- Founded: 1940; 85 years ago
- Founder: Howard B. Morrow
- Headquarters: San Bernardino, California, United States
- Key people: Frank Morrow; Victor G. Paradise; Edgar Schmued

Morrow Aircraft Corporation was American aircraft and aerospace manufacturing company in San Bernardino, California. It developed a process to build airplanes out of plastic impregnated wood.

== History ==
Plans for a $65,000 plant at the yet-completed Municipal Airport, San Bernardino were announced in October 1940. By the dedication of the airport in December, construction had started on the facility. The 28,000 sq ft (2,600 m^{2}) plant was somewhat unique in that it was completely air conditioned. After originally facing a shortage of engineers, the company tripled its staff and moved to the new location in May 1941. The company received a certificate authorizing expansion a few weeks later.

Morrow was forced to sell its plant to the War Department in February 1942 for $64,000. The following month, the company began removing its equipment to Rialto and the Tri-City Airport. Shortly thereafter, it announced plans to begin hiring women and begin building wooden pilots' seats. In 1943, it became the Morrow Aircraft-Ziebrach Joint Adventure.

== Aircraft ==
Model name	First flight	Number built	Type
Morrow 1-L	1941	1	Single engine monoplane trainer

== See also ==
- California during World War II
