= Tri-City Airport =

Tri-City Airport may refer to:

- Tri-City Airport (Kansas) in Parsons, Kansas, United States (FAA: PPF)
- Tri-City Airport (Sebring, Ohio) in Mahoning County, Ohio, United States (FAA: 3G6)
- Tri-City Airport (West Lafayette, Ohio) in Coshocton County, Ohio, United States (FAA: 80G)
- Tri-City Airport, San Bernardino in San Bernardino, California
- MBS International Airport in Freeland, Michigan, United States, formerly known as Tri City Airport (FAA: MBS)

== See also ==
- Tri-Cities Airport (disambiguation)
