= Tri-Cities Airport =

Tri-Cities Airport may refer to:

- Tri-Cities Airport (New York) in Endicott, New York, United States (FAA: CZG)
- Tri-Cities Airport (Washington) in Pasco, Washington, United States (FAA/IATA: PSC)
- Tri-Cities Airport (Tennessee) in Tennessee (FAA/IATA: TRI)

== See also ==
- Tri-City Airport (disambiguation)
