= Morrow 1-L =

General information
- Type: Trainer
- National origin: United States of America
- Manufacturer: Morrow Aircraft Corporation
- Number built: 1

The Morrow 1-L was a prototype tandem-seat trainer produced by the Morrow Aircraft Corporation. It employed plastic impregnated wood in its construction.

== Design and development ==
Morrow Aircraft factory designed and built the Model 1-L tandem two-seat trainer for Civilian Pilot Training Program. Morrow Aircraft used a plastic bonded plywood construction for the body and was powered by a Lycoming O-435 engine. The Model 1-L was also called the Victory Trainer. The factory was at the Municipal Airport, San Bernardino, now Norton Air Force Base. Designed by Edgar Schmued who also worked on the North American P-51 Mustang. The Victory Trainer prototype was built, but not used for the World War II effort. The Victory Trainer wing and tail resembled that of the P-51 Mustang, so the plane was called the Little Mustang by some.

The aircraft was officially tested by Vance Breese in front of an audience of American and British military officials on 1 November 1941. Construction on a static test as well as a second airworthy airframe began a few weeks later. Following completion, the aircraft was flown to Purdue University Airport, where it was tested by Purdue University students.

== Specifications (Morrow 1-L Victory Trainer) ==
Data from Morrow Aircraft Corporation

General characteristics

- Crew: 2 - Tandem enclosed cockpits with complete dual control and instruments. Doors to each cockpit.
- Length: 25 ft 4 in (7.72 m)
- Wingspan: 30 ft 4 in (9.24 m)
- Height: 7 ft 9 in (2.36 m)
- Wing area: 142.5 sq ft (13.24 m^{2})
- Empty weight: 965 lb (438 kg)
- Gross weight: 1,650 lb (748 kg)
- Fuel capacity: 27 US gal (22 imp gal; 100 L)Tandem enclosed cockpits with complete dual control and instruments. Doors to each cockpit.
- Powerplant: 1 × Lycoming O-435 6-cyl horizontally-opposed air-cooled piston engine, 175 hp (130 kW) at 3,000 rpm
- Propellers: 2-bladed constant-speed propeller

Performance

- Maximum speed: 180 mph (290 km/h, 160 kn)
- Cruise speed: 160 mph (260 km/h, 140 kn)
- Range: 1,000 mi (1,600 km, 870 nmi)
- Service ceiling: 17,500 ft (5,300 m)
- Rate of climb: 900 ft/min (4.6 m/s)

== See also ==
Aircraft of comparable role, configuration, and era

- Timm N2T Tutor
