= Gertrude Tompkins Silver =

American aviator

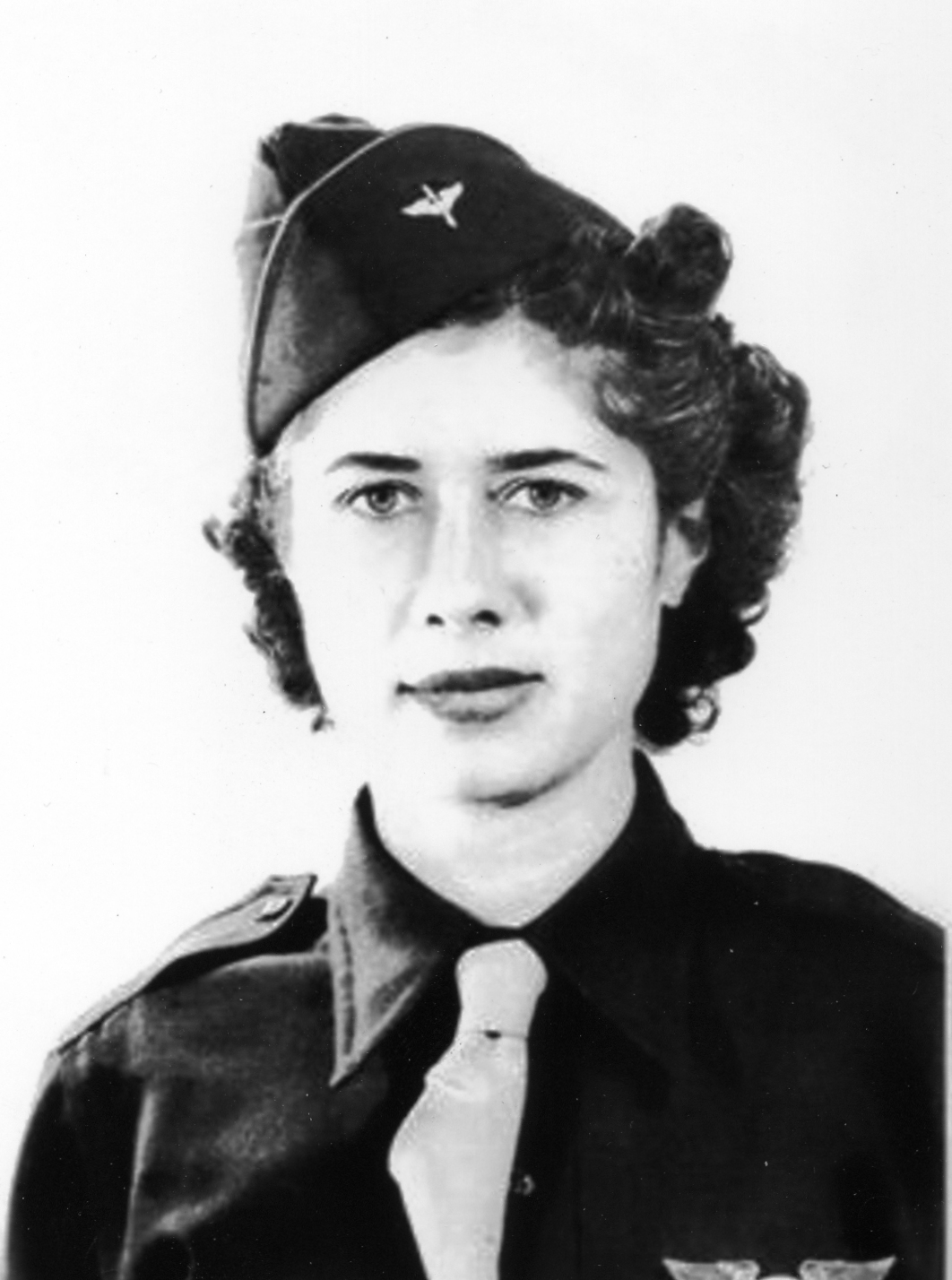
- Gertrude Tompkins Silver WASP photo.
- Born: Gertrude Vreeland Tompkins; October 16, 1911; Jersey City, New Jersey, U.S.
- Disappeared: October 26, 1944 (aged 33); Los Angeles, California, U.S.
- Status: Missing for 81 years and 10 months
- Occupation: Pilot
- Era: World War II
- Organization: Women Airforce Service Pilots
- Spouse: Henry Silver

Notes
- Graduated WASP Class 43-W-7

Gertrude "Tommy" Tompkins Silver (October 16, 1911 – disappeared October 26, 1944) was the only Women Airforce Service Pilots member to go missing during World War II.

== Early life ==
Gertrude Vreeland Tompkins was born October 16, 1911, in Jersey City, New Jersey, the daughter of Vreeland Tompkins, founder of Smooth-On, Inc., and Laura Tompkins (née Towar). The family later moved to Summit, New Jersey. Gertrude attended Ambler School of Horticulture and moved to New York City following her graduation. Following the death of her boyfriend, who took her flying and later died while flying for the Royal Air Force, Gertrude applied to the WASP program. She had a stutter when she was a child.

== Disappearance and search ==
She departed from Mines Field (Los Angeles International Airport) for Palm Springs, on October 26, 1944, flying a North American P-51D Mustang destined for New Jersey. She never arrived at Palm Springs and due to reporting errors a search was not started until three days later. Despite an extensive ground and water search, no trace of Silver or the aircraft were found.

== Follow up and aftermath ==
According to historian Pat Macha, the plane probably crashed near Dockweiler State Beach, just a few miles from Mines Field. In January 2010, search efforts to locate the possible crash site in Santa Monica Bay were unsuccessful.

The television show Expedition Unknown, Season 6, Episode 8, "America's Lost WWII Hero", aired on the Discovery Channel on May 22, 2019. In this episode they searched for Gertrude "Tommy" Tompkins' crash site. Areas searched included the San Jacinto Mountains east of Los Angeles. They also searched the departure corridor off of runway 25 out over the nearby ocean. These searches were unsuccessful.

== See also ==
- List of people who disappeared
