= Vicksburg–Tallulah Regional Airport =

Public-use general aviation airport in Madison Parish, Louisiana, U.S.

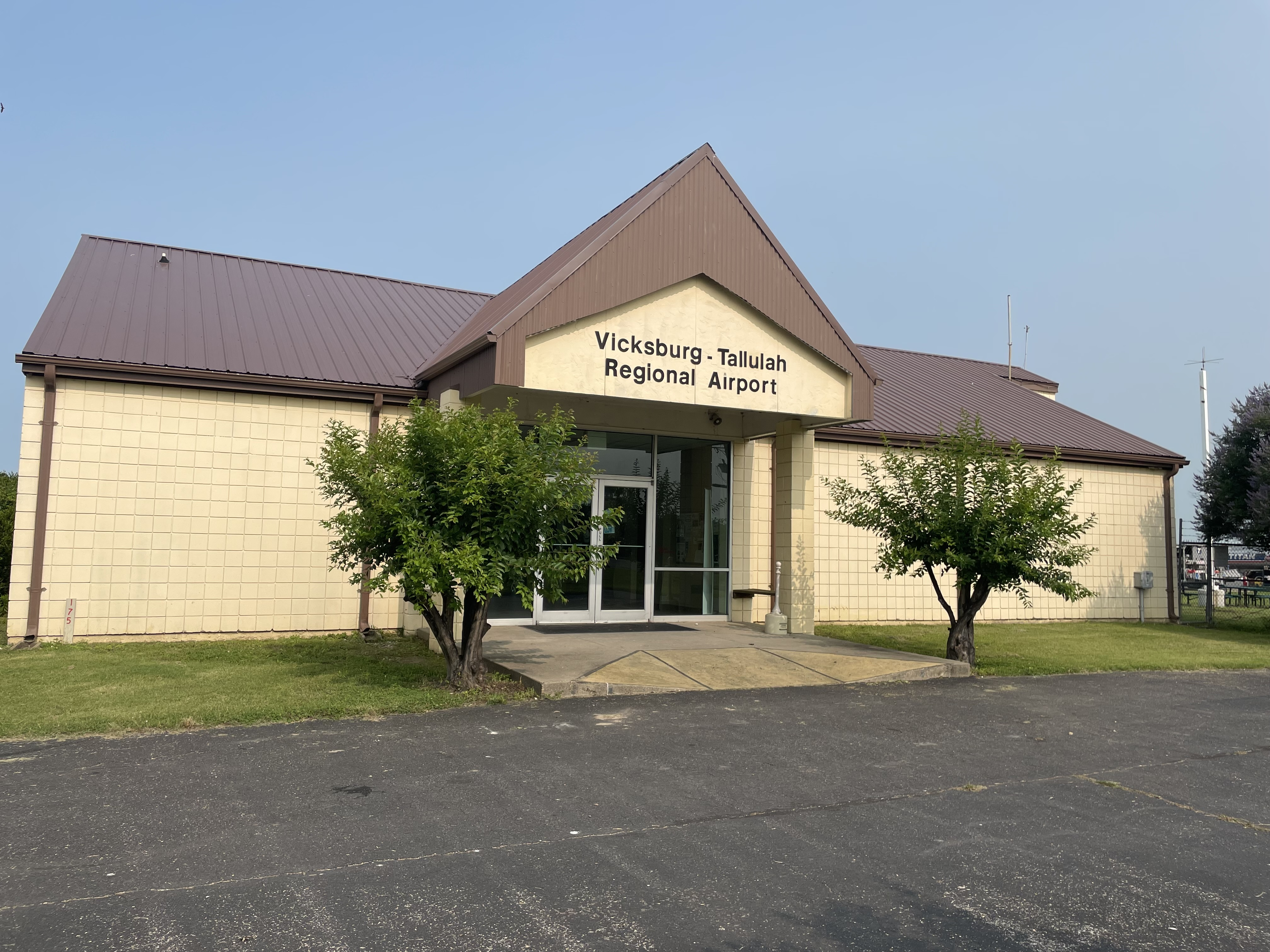
- IATA: none; ICAO: none

Summary
- Airport type: Public
- Owner: Vicksburg–Tallulah District
- Serves: Tallulah, Louisiana; Vicksburg, Mississippi
- Location: Madison Parish, Louisiana, U.S. (near Mound)
- Elevation AMSL: 86 ft / 26 m
- Coordinates: 32°21′06″N 091°01′40″W
- Website: www.vtrairport.com
- Interactive map of Vicksburg–Tallulah Regional Airport

Runways
Direction	Length		Surface
Direction	ft	m	Surface
18/36	5,002	1,525	Asphalt
- Sources: FAA (AirNav), LA DOTD, VTR Airport

Vicksburg–Tallulah Regional Airport is a public-use general aviation airport in Madison Parish, Louisiana, United States since 1992. It lies just north of the village of Mound, about 9 miles (14 km) east of Tallulah and roughly 7 nautical miles (13 km) west of Vicksburg, Mississippi. The facility is owned by the Vicksburg–Tallulah District and serves the Vicksburg–Tallulah area for business and recreational flying.

== Facilities ==
Vicksburg–Tallulah Regional has one asphalt runway, 18/36, measuring 5,002 by 100 ft (1,525 by 30 m) with medium-intensity edge lighting. Runway 36 is equipped with a simplified short approach lighting system and Precision Approach Path Indicators. The field has published instrument procedures, including an ILS/LOC to Runway 36 and RNAV approaches to both runway ends.

An on‑field ASOS provides weather on 118.525 MHz. The airport offers 100LL and Jet A fuel and standard FBO services through the airport administration.

== Ownership and governance ==
The airport is owned by the Vicksburg–Tallulah District and managed by the Vicksburg–Tallulah District Airport Board. In state filings, the Board is reported as a quasi‑governmental component unit of the Madison Parish Police Jury. The Louisiana Department of Transportation and Development lists the facility under site code TVR with its administrative address at 175 VTR Airport Road, Tallulah, LA 71282.

== Tenants and attractions ==
The Southern Heritage Air Foundation and its Southern Heritage Air Museum are located on the airfield, hosting an aviation museum and events such as formation clinics and air shows.

== Codes ==
The airport uses FAA location identifier TVR and ICAO code KTVR. It does not have an assigned IATA code; the open-data dataset at OurAirports reports the IATA field blank for KTVR, with TVR shown as the local/FAA code.

== See also ==
- List of airports in Louisiana
