= Edgar Schmued =

German-American aircraft designer (1899–1985)

Edgar O. (Ed) Schmued
- Edgar Schmued (photo: c. 1940s)
- Born: 30 December 1899; Hornbach, German Empire
- Died: 1 June 1985 (aged 85); Oceanside, California, US
- Occupations: Designer, North American Aviation; Northrop

Edgar O. "Ed" Schmued (Schmüd; 1899–1985) was an Austrian/German-American aircraft designer, famed for his design of the iconic North American P-51 Mustang and, later, the F-86 Sabre while at North American Aviation. He later worked on other aircraft designs as an aviation consultant.

== Early life ==
Edgar Schmüd was born in Hornbach, Germany, 30 December 1899. His father Heinrich Schmüd was an Austrian, so Edgar inherited Austrian citizenship until he would finally adopt the American one. At the age of eight, he first saw an airplane in flight and decided that aviation was to be his life's work. Edgar embarked early on a rigorous program of self-study to become an engineer, and later served an apprenticeship in a small engine factory. He also designed several innovative engine components for which he received patents. In his spare time, he continued the self-study of aviation. In World War I, he served in the Austro-Hungarian Aviation Troops as a mechanic. Schmued left his native Germany for Brazil in 1925, seven years after World War I had shattered the German economy. His experience in Germany led to employment with the General Aviation, the air branch of General Motors Corporation in São Paulo, Brazil. In 1931, he was sponsored to move to the United States through his excellent work for General Motors in Brazil (immigration rules were extremely strict at that time - he was one of 794 people admitted in the quota) and went straight to work for Fokker Aircraft Corporation of America, which was an aircraft company that was a subsidiary of General Motors, which had a 40% holding, and based in New Jersey. There he began his career as an aircraft design engineer. General Motors later sold its air arm and it became the forerunner of North American Aviation.

== Aviation engineer ==
The talented and inventive Schmued, by now a citizen of the United States, was employed by North American Aviation (NAA) in Dundalk, Maryland. In 1935, North American was relocated to Los Angeles, California, by General Motors. When his wife Luisa proved reluctant to relocate from the east coast, Schmued joined Bellanca but his time there was short-lived. While traveling to California to work again for North American, the Schmueds were involved in a head-on collision on Route 60. Schmued's wife was killed, while he himself was seriously injured.

=== North American Aviation ===
After recovering, Schmued went to work for NAA's President James H. "Dutch" Kindelberger in early 1936 as a preliminary design engineer. He was involved in the XB-21 (designing the front turret), creating the NA-50 single-engine fighter for Peru then going on to design work on the NA-62 (later the B-25 Mitchell). Schmued later became Chief of Preliminary Design.

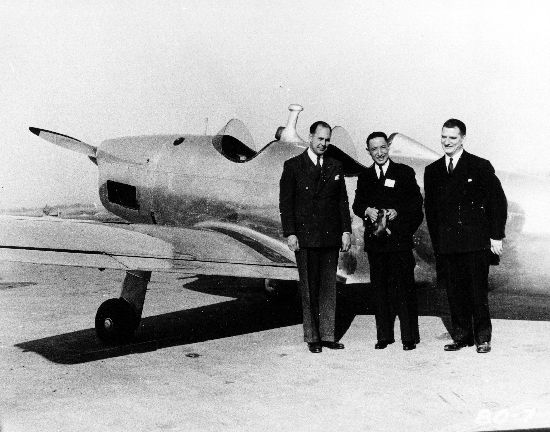
The NA-35 (later Vega 35) is shown at NAA's facility, with Edgar Schmued standing at the right.

During his long tenure at NAA, Schmued contributed greatly to the design of many airplanes. By far his most famous design was the highly successful P-51 Mustang of World War II. The legend began with a British procurement commission asking NAA to build Curtiss P-40 Kittyhawks under license for the Royal Air Force. Kindelberger asked Schmued "Ed, do we want to build P-40s here?" Schmued had been long awaiting a question like this. His answer began the design process, "Well, Dutch, don't let us build an obsolete airplane, let's build a new one. We can design and build a better one." His adaptation of the then new laminar flow wing and other innovations made the P-51 performance outstanding in all respects and its flying qualities superb. This aircraft was still winning races and setting speed records for piston engine-powered airplanes decades after its production had ended. Although he was renowned as a workaholic at North American, Schmued undertook the design of the Morrow 1-L Victory Trainer in 1941 on an independent contract; it was dubbed the "Mini-Mustang" because of its close resemblance to the P-51.

Fueled by both a striking similarity of the early Mustang and the German Messerschmitt Bf 109 - pilots and ground crews of both sides confused the two aircraft - and Schmued's German origin, an urban legend has grown up, claiming he had once worked for Willy Messerschmitt and that the Mustang was heavily influenced by the Bf 109. Neither claim is true but the urban legend persists. Another myth claims that the abortive Curtiss XP-46 was the basis of the P-51 design.

Schmued was employed by North American Aviation for 22 years. During his tenure, Schmued also designed the F-82 and, the other iconic NAA designs, the F-86 Sabre and F-100 Super Sabre.

== Northrop and later years ==
After leaving North American in August 1952, Schmued spent five years as Vice President of Engineering for the Northrop Corporation. At Northrop he recruited a top engineering team he used to develop the successful F-5 supersonic light fighter and the closely related T-38 trainer. For these aircraft Schmued emphasized not only performance, but simplicity, safety, low cost, and long service life. The resulting F-5 was not only the most cost effective U.S. supersonic fighter, but likely also the most combat effective U.S. air-to-air fighter design in the 1960s and early 1970s. The well regarded and long lived F-5 and the T-38 aircraft remain in active service as of 2024 in Swiss Air Force. The F-5 serves as an adversary aircraft for the U.S. Air Force and Navy in fighter combat training, as well as a front line fighter in the air forces of more than 20 nations. The T-38 has served as the primary advanced/supersonic trainer for the U.S. Air Force for more than 50 years, a record unequaled by any other aircraft of this class.

Edgar Schmued continued his aircraft design work as an independent consultant following his retirement from Northrop in October, 1957. He consulted for the U.S. Department of Defense, allied nations, for private companies, and for the film industry making aviation related movies. He worked actively until shortly before his death from a heart condition on 1 June 1985.

Any damned fool can criticize, but it takes a genius to design it in the first place.

— Edgar Schmued, Chief Designer North American Aviation,

Special US Commemorative Cover issued 1991

== Honors ==
Edgar Schmued was inducted into the International Aerospace Hall of Fame on 14 September 1991.

== See also ==
- Morrow Aircraft Corporation's Victory Trainer, he designed
