= Schicker Mound =

- Location within Louisiana today
- 32°24′0.4″N 91°11′33.9″W
- Location: Tallulah, Louisiana, Madison Parish, Louisiana, USA
- Region: Madison Parish, Louisiana

Schicker Mound is a Native American archaeological site located near Tallulah, Louisiana, United States. It is located very close to suburban houses.

== Description ==
The site consists of a platform mound which now measures 5 feet (1.5 m) in height, with the base being 115 feet (35 m) by 115 feet (35 m). Site surveys have not produced and items or artifacts which would help to definitively date it to a specific time period. The mound had a substantial amount of fill removed from it to accommodate a cellar and house foundation in 1926.
