= Tri-City Airport, San Bernardino =

Former Airport

Coordinates: 34.0671°N 117.2725°W

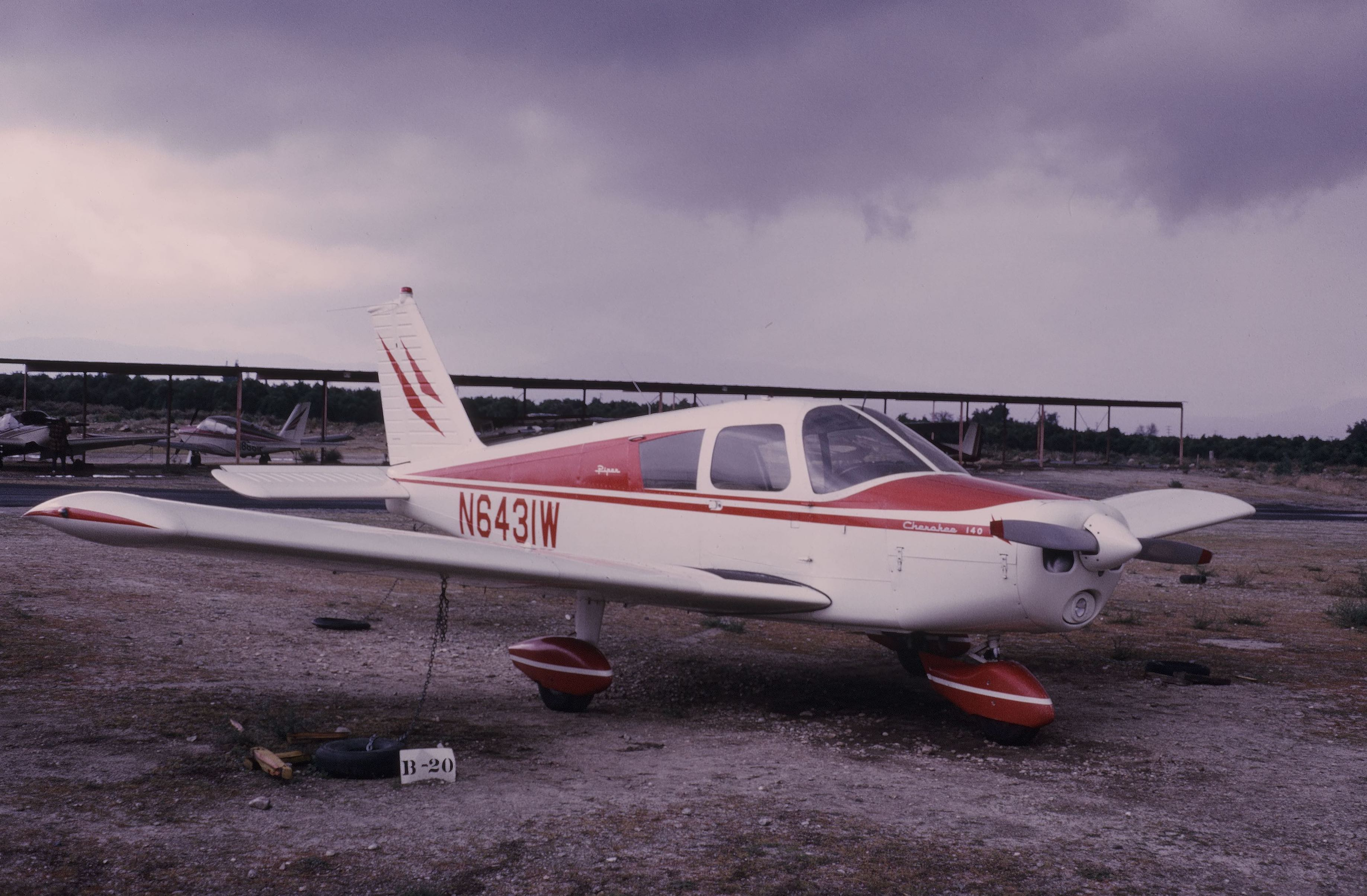
Aircraft parked at Tri-City Airport in December 1966

Tri-City Airport was a small privately owned airport located in San Bernardino, California just north of Interstate 10 and east of Waterman Avenue. The Tri-City Corporate Center now occupies the land where it was located.

It was owned by Pinky Brier and Joe Brier.
