= Mound, Louisiana =

- Village
- Mound
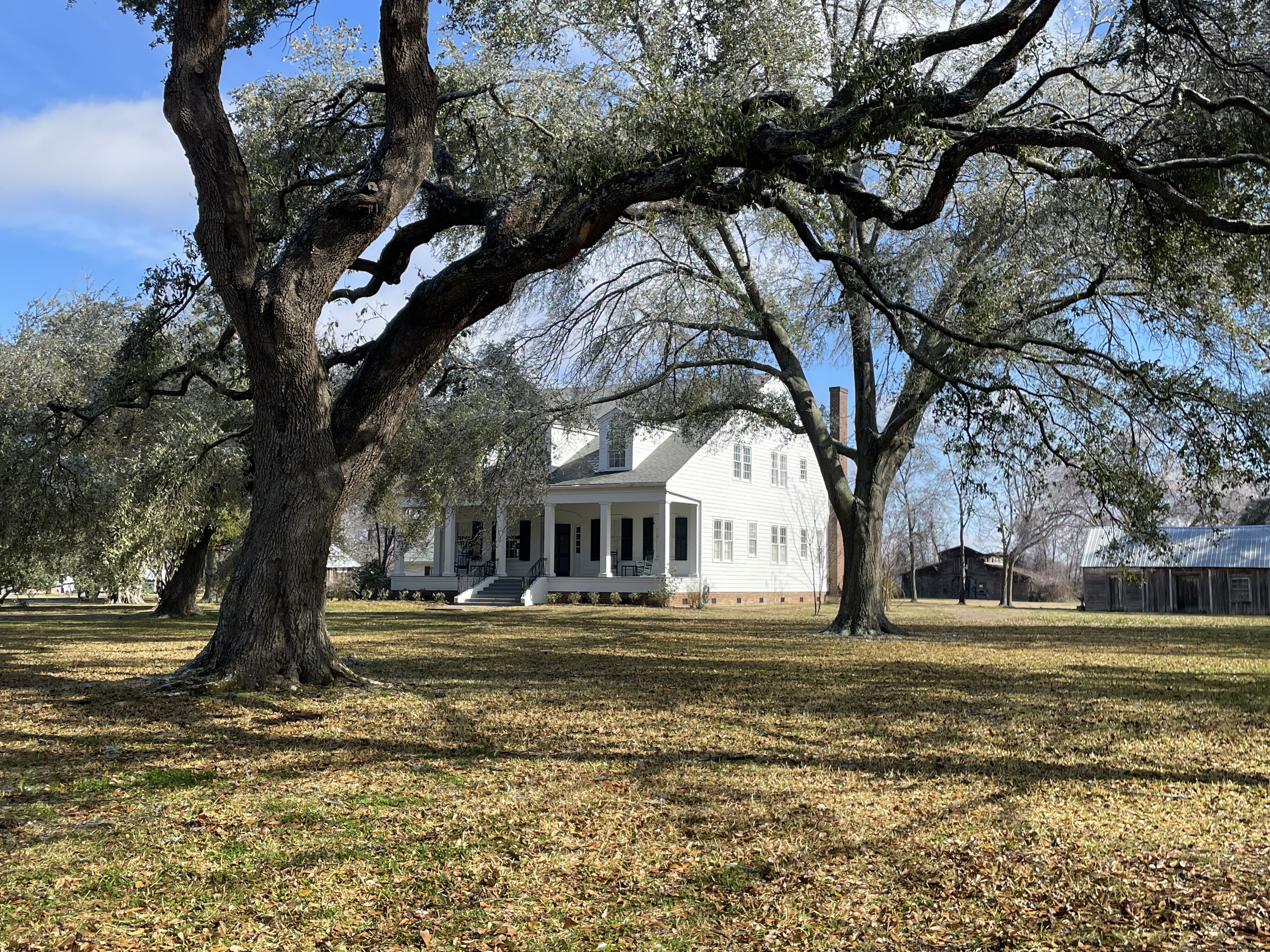
- House in Mound

- Location in Madison Parish, Louisiana

- Location of Louisiana in the United States
- Coordinates: 32°19′59″N 91°01′29″W
- Country: United States
- State: Louisiana
- Parish: Madison

Government
  - Mayor: Tiffany Yerger

Area
  - Total: 0.53 sq mi (1.36 km^{2})
  - Land: 0.52 sq mi (1.35 km^{2})
  - Water: 0 sq mi (0.00 km^{2})
- Elevation: 92 ft (28 m)

Population (2020)
  - Total: 12
  - Density: 23.0/sq mi (8.87/km^{2})
- Time zone: UTC-6 (CST)
  - Summer (DST): UTC-5 (CDT)
- ZIP Code: 71282
- Area code: 318
- FIPS code: 22-52565
- GNIS feature ID: 2407508

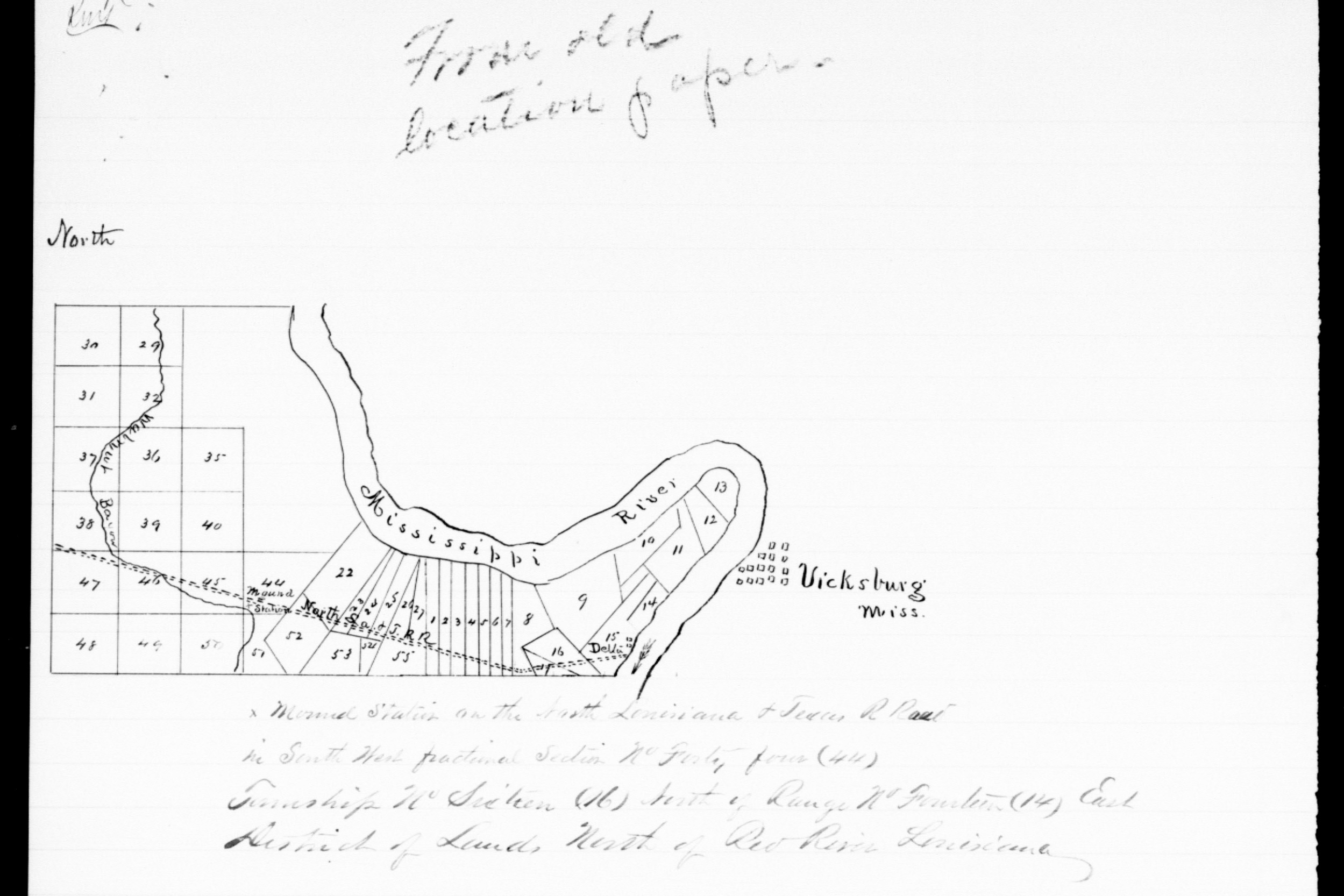

Mound is a village in Madison Parish, Louisiana, United States. With a population of 12 at the 2020 census, it is Louisiana's smallest village by population. Its ZIP Code is 71282. It is part of the Tallulah Micropolitan Statistical Area.

== History ==
The village took its name from a Native American mound at the original site. In a 2019 feature, local residents and officials noted that Mound was incorporated in c. 1917 and that early activity included a hotel, a general store by the railroad, and a small sawmill east of the settlement.

== Geography ==
Mound is in eastern Madison Parish, 2 miles (3 km) south of the Mississippi River. Along U.S. Route 80, it is 10 miles (16 km) east of Tallulah, the parish seat, and 12 miles (19 km) west of Vicksburg, Mississippi. Interstate 20 passes through the southern part of the village, with access from Exit 182.

Vicksburg–Tallulah Regional Airport is on the north side of the village.

According to the U.S. Census Bureau, the village has an area of 0.52 square miles (1.35 km^{2}), of which 0.002 square miles (0.005 km^{2}), or 0.38%, are water. Walnut Bayou, an anabranch of the Mississippi River, passes through the southwest corner of the village.

== Demographics ==
Historical population
Census	Pop.	Note	%±
1940	145		—
1950	105		−27.6%
1960	107		1.9%
1970	78		−27.1%
1980	40		−48.7%
1990	16		−60.0%
2000	12		−25.0%
2010	19		58.3%
2020	12		−36.8%
2025 (est.)	12	Steady	0.0%
U.S. Decennial Census

At the 2000 census there were 12 people, 4 households, and 4 families in the village. The population density was 49.3 inhabitants per square mile (19.0/km^{2}). There were 5 housing units at an average density of 20.5 per square mile (8.0/km^{2}). The racial makeup of the village was 100.00% White. 50.0% had children under the age of 18 living with them, 100.0% were married couples living together, and 0.0% were non-families. No households were one person, and none had someone living alone who was 65 or older. The average household size was 3.00 and the average family size was 3.00.

The age distribution was 25.0% under the age of 18, 8.3% from 18 to 24, 25.0% from 25 to 44, 25.0% from 45 to 64, and 16.7% 65 or older. The median age was 42 years. For every 100 females, there were 50.0 males. For every 100 females age 18 and over, there were 80.0 males.

The median household income was in excess of $200,000, as was the median family income. Males and females had a median income over $100,000. The per capita income for the village was $92,200. There were 33.3% of families living below the poverty line and 50.0% of the population, including 50.0% of those under 18 and none of those over 64.

== Education ==
Public education for Mound is provided by the Madison Parish School District, with campuses in nearby Tallulah that include Tallulah Elementary School, Wright Elementary School, Madison Middle School, Madison High School, and Christian Acres Alternative School. The private school Tallulah Academy Delta Christian School also operates in the parish.

== Transportation ==
Interstate 20 runs along the south side of Mound, and U.S. Route 80 passes immediately to the north; Louisiana Highway 602 connects the village with both corridors. The nearest public-use airport is Vicksburg–Tallulah Regional Airport (KTVR) just north of the village.

== Climate ==
According to 1991–2020 climate normals from the NOAA station at Tallulah (USC00168923), the area's annual mean temperature is 67.5 °F (19.7 °C) and average annual precipitation is 57.87 inches (1,469.9 mm). July–August daily normals average about 84 °F (28.9 °C), and January's mean is about 49.0 °F (9.4 °C).
