= National Register of Historic Places listings in Webster Parish, Louisiana =

Location of Webster Parish in Louisiana

This is a list of the National Register of Historic Places listings in Webster Parish, Louisiana.

This is intended to be a complete list of the properties and districts on the National Register of Historic Places in Webster Parish, Louisiana, United States. The locations of National Register properties and districts for which the latitude and longitude coordinates are included below, may be seen in a map.

There are 19 properties and districts listed on the National Register in the parish.

This National Park Service list is complete through NPS recent listings posted May 1, 2026.

== Current listings ==
	Name on the Register	Image	Date listed	Location	City or town	Description
1	Bank of Minden	Bank of Minden	February 11, 1988 (#88000104)	605 Main St. 32°36′56″N 93°17′12″W	Minden	
2	Bank of Webster	Bank of Webster	September 16, 1987 (#87001468)	704 Main St. 32°36′57″N 93°17′10″W	Minden	
3	Bryan House	Bryan House	August 27, 1999 (#99001037)	2086 Harold Montgomery Rd. 32°28′13″N 93°25′34″W	Doyline	
4	Downtown Minden Historic District	Downtown Minden Historic District	June 21, 1996 (#96000680)	Roughly bounded by Monroe, Pine, Main, E. Union, Chevrolet, and Fogle Sts. 32°36′56″N 93°17′10″W	Minden	
5	Drake House		July 18, 1985 (#85001585)	1202 Broadway; 32°37′10″N 93°16′51″W	Minden	
6	Fitzgerald House	Fitzgerald House	May 18, 2001 (#01000510)	304 McDonald; 32°37′10″N 93°17′04″W	Minden	
7	Fuller House	Fuller House	April 18, 1996 (#96000433)	220 W. Union; 32°37′03″N 93°17′15″W	Minden	
8	Germantown	Germantown	March 12, 1979 (#79001100)	Off U.S. Route 79; 32°42′00″N 93°13′50″W	Minden	
9	Hodges House		January 12, 1983 (#83000553)	West of Cotton Valley off Louisiana Highways 7 and 160; 32°49′15″N 93°25′30″W	Cotton Valley	
10	McDonald House		August 13, 1986 (#86001496)	328 Lewisville Rd. 32°37′14″N 93°17′01″W	Minden	
11	Miller Farmstead		October 6, 2004 (#04001113)	224 Louisiana Highway 518; 32°38′50″N 93°13′18″W	Minden	
12	Miller House		April 18, 1996 (#96000431)	416 Broadway; 32°36′47″N 93°17′16″W	Minden	
13	Minden Historic District		November 5, 1992 (#92001527)	Roughly Broadway, East/West St., and Lewisville Rd. bordering Academy Park and adjacent parts of Elm St. and Fort St. 32°37′15″N 93°16′55″W	Minden	
14	O'Bier House		November 27, 1992 (#92001633)	Parish Highway 114 north of Minden; 32°41′59″N 93°13′50″W	Minden	
15	Shadow House		January 15, 1998 (#97001651)	Louisiana Highway 531 north of Dubberly; 32°33′38″N 93°14′53″W	Dubberly	
16	Union Church	Union Church	January 25, 1995 (#94001562)	Junction of Yellow Pine Rd. and Louisiana Highway 7; 32°28′39″N 93°19′22″W	Sibley	
17	Watkins House	Watkins House	December 8, 1997 (#97001519)	109 N. College; 32°37′09″N 93°17′15″W	Minden	
18	Webster Parish Library Building	Webster Parish Library Building	December 10, 1980 (#80001768)	521 East-West St. 32°37′17″N 93°16′51″W	Minden	
19	Yellow Pine School	Yellow Pine School	October 1, 2004 (#04001081)	432 Yellow Pine Rd. 32°28′58″N 93°18′54″W	Sibley	

== See also ==
- List of National Historic Landmarks in Louisiana
- National Register of Historic Places listings in Louisiana
