= Bryan House =

Bryan House or variations such as Bryan Hall may refer to:

in the United States

(by state then city)

- Craig-Bryan House, Bentonville, Arkansas, listed on the National Register of Historic Places (NRHP)
- Matthews-Bryan House, North Little Rock, Arkansas, NRHP-listed
- Bryan House No. 2, Rogers, Arkansas, NRHP-listed
- Bryan House (Van Buren, Arkansas), NRHP-listed
- Bryan Hose House, Idaho Springs, Colorado, NRHP-listed in Clear Creek County
- Roderick Bryan House, Watertown, Connecticut, NRHP-listed in Litchfield County
- Bryan Hall (Gainesville, Florida), NRHP-listed
- William Jennings Bryan House (Miami, Florida), also known as Villa Serena, NRHP-listed
- Bryan Hall (Gainesville, Florida), Gainesville, Florida, NRHP-listed
- Hardy Bryan House, Thomasville, Georgia, NRHP-listed in Thomas County
- William Jennings Bryan Boyhood Home, Salem, Illinois, NRHP-listed
- Bryan House (Bloomington, Indiana), campus home of the president of Indiana University
- Alden Bryan House, Davenport, Iowa, NRHP-listed
- George and Betty Bryan House, Nicholasville, Kentucky, NRHP-listed in Jessamine County
- Marshall-Bryan House, Nicholasville, Kentucky, NRHP-listed in Jessamine County
- Bryan House (Simpsonville, Kentucky), NRHP-listed in Shelby County
- Bryan House (Doyline, Louisiana), NRHP-listed in Webster Parish
- William Jennings Bryan House (Lincoln, Nebraska), a U.S. National Historic Landmark
- William Jennings Bryan House (Asheville, North Carolina), NRHP-listed
- Bryan House and Office, New Bern, North Carolina, NRHP-listed
- Bryan–Bell Farm, Pollocksville, North Carolina, NRHP-listed
- Brian Farm, Gettysburg, Pennsylvania; also referred to as Bryan House and similar variations
- Bryan Ice House, Bryan, Texas, NRHP-listed in Brazos County
- Barclay-Bryan House, Temple, Texas, NRHP-listed in Bell County
- Bryan Manor, Williamsburg, Virginia, NRHP-listed

== See also ==
- William Jennings Bryan House (disambiguation)
- Bryan Building, Fort Lauderdale, Florida, NRHP-listed
- House of Bryan (TV show), 21st-century Canadian renovation TV series
- "House of Bryan" (TV episode), 2022 season 5 episode 1 of Island of Bryan
- Bryan (disambiguation)
- House (disambiguation)
