= William Jennings Bryan House =

William Jennings Bryan House or variations may refer to:

- William Jennings Bryan House (Miami, Florida), listed on the National Register of Historic Places (NRHP), known also as Villa Serena
- William Jennings Bryan Boyhood Home, Salem, Illinois, NRHP-listed
- William Jennings Bryan House (Lincoln, Nebraska), NRHP-listed and a U.S. National Historic Landmark
- William Jennings Bryan House (Asheville, North Carolina), NRHP-listed

== See also ==
- William Jennings Bryan
- Bryan House (disambiguation)
