= Irvin Talton =

American politician

Louisiana State Representative for Webster Parish
- In office 1880–1884
- Preceded by: J. J. Carter
- Succeeded by: G. L. P. Wren

Member of the Webster Parish Police Jury for Ward 5
- In office 1877–1880
- Preceded by: O. L. Noles
- Succeeded by: E. F. Lewis

Personal details
- Party: Democratic

Irvin Talton (full name and places and dates of birth, death, and burial missing) was an American politician. A Democrat, he served from 1880 to 1884 in the Louisiana House of Representatives for Webster Parish in northwestern Louisiana.

Prior to his term in the House, Talton was from 1877 to 1880 a member of the Webster Parish Police Jury, the parish governing body, akin to the county commission in other states. He represented Dubberly, Heflin, and south Webster Parish.

Little else is known of Talton. There were numerous Taltons in south Webster Parish in the late 19th century, some interred at Fellowship Cemetery in Dubberly, but there are no birth, death, or American Civil War records found on Irvin Talton. The state website lists his name erroneously as "Irwin Tarlton."

Preceded by J. J. Carter	Louisiana State Representative for Webster Parish; 1880—1884	Succeeded by G. L. P. Wren
