= Smith & Carrier =

American architectural firm

Smith & Carrier was an architectural partnership based in Asheville, North Carolina. It was formed in 1906 as a partnership of Richard Sharp Smith (1852–1924) and Albert Heath Carrier (1878–1961).

The firm lasted until the death of Smith in 1924 and created more than 700 works. After Smith's death, Carrier completed some open commissions but did not do much more. A number of the firm's works are listed on the U.S. National Register of Historic Places.

Works include:

- William Jennings Bryan House, 107 Evelyn Pl., Asheville, North Carolina (Smith & Carrier), NRHP-listed
- Jackson County Courthouse, Main St., Sylva, North Carolina (Smith & Carrier), NRHP-listed
- Madison County Courthouse, Main St., Marshall, North Carolina (Smith & Carrier), NRHP-listed
- One or more works in Marshall Main Street Historic District, 101 N. Main St.- 165 S. Main St., Bridge St. and 33 Bailey's Branch Rd., Marshall, North Carolina (Smith & Carrier), NRHP-listed
- Intheoaks (entrance gates), 1922, NRHP-listed
