= Bank of Minden =

- U.S. National Register of Historic Places
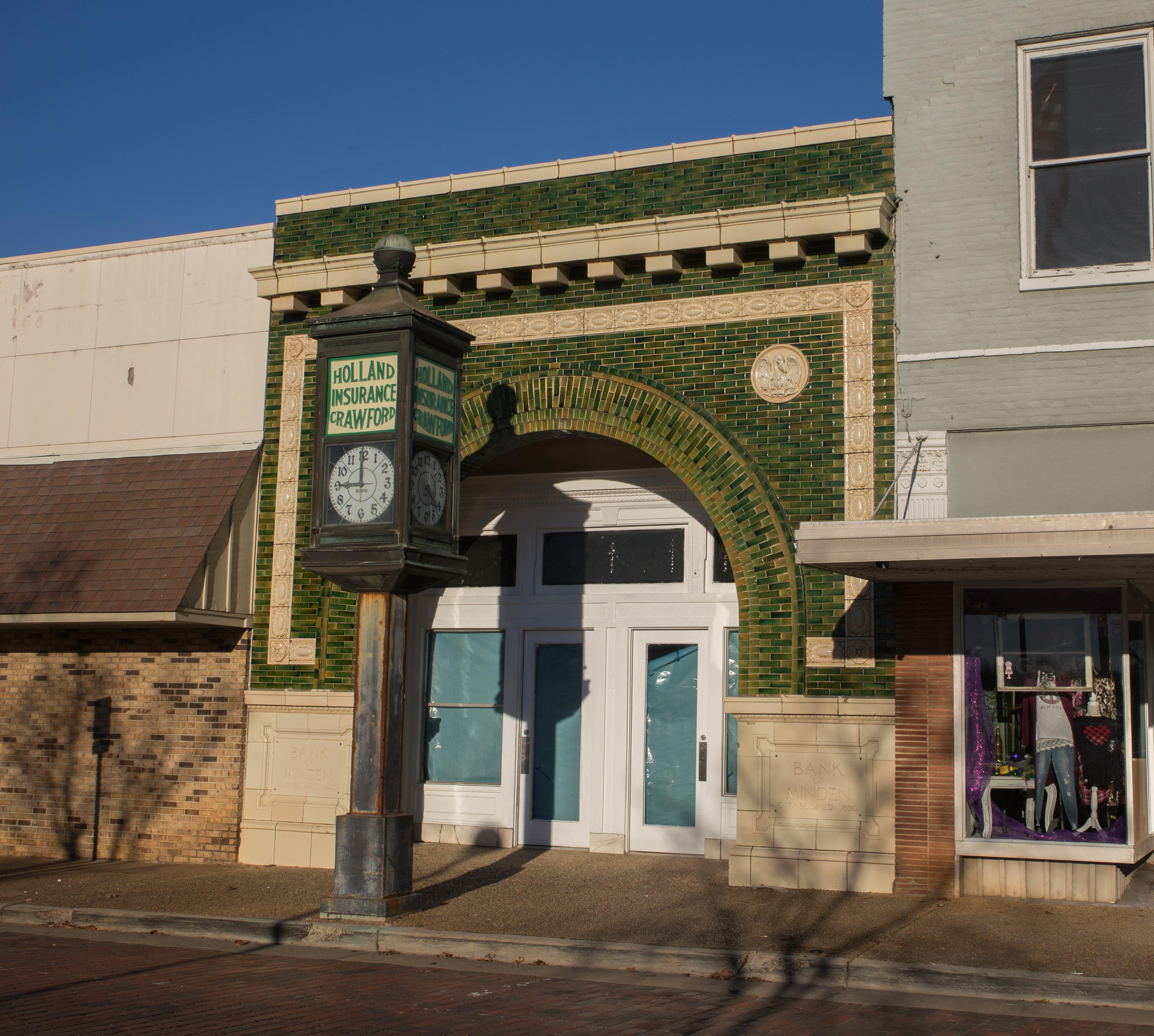
- Bank of Minden in Minden, Louisiana

- Location within Louisiana Location within the United States
- Location: 605 Main St., Minden, Louisiana
- Coordinates: 32°36′56″N 93°17′12″W
- Area: 0.1 acres (0.040 ha)
- Built: 1901
- Architectural style: Romanesque
- NRHP reference No.: 88000104
- Added to NRHP: February 11, 1988

The Bank of Minden, at 605 Main St. in Minden in Webster Parish, Louisiana, was built in 1901. Also known as the Holland—Crawford Insurance Building, it was listed on the National Register of Historic Places in 1988.

The bank has a particularly rich facade. The bank's original street clock was restored and, in 1988, was functioning.

Its National Register nomination reports that a survey of historic buildings in Webster Parish identified 432 older than fifty years, of which only seventeen were masonry commercial buildings dating from c.1900 to c.1935. Of these, most are quite plain; only the Bank of Minden and the Bank of Webster (NRHP-listed) were determined to have "sufficient architectural distinction to merit individual listing in the National Register. The Bank of Minden, with its grand Romanesque Revival arched entrance and elaborate detailing, is in sharp contrast to the rest of the parish's fairly typical historic commercial buildings. In addition, it is the only one to feature such exceptionally fine materials as glazed brick, terra-cotta, and ornamentally cut sheets of plate glass."
