= James E. Bolin =

American politician and judge

Louisiana State Representative for Webster Parish
- In office 1940–1944
- Preceded by: Drayton R. Boucher
- Succeeded by: C.W. Thompson

District Attorney, 26th Judicial District of Louisiana
- In office December 14, 1948 – October 1, 1952
- Preceded by: Arthur M. Wallace
- Succeeded by: Louis H. Padgett, Jr.

Judge, 26th Judicial District Court of Louisiana
- In office October 1, 1952 – 1960
- Preceded by: J. Frank McInnis
- Succeeded by: O. E. Price; Enos C. McClendon

Judge, Louisiana Second Circuit Court of Appeal
- In office 1960–1978
- Preceded by: New position

Chief Judge, Louisiana Second Circuit Court of Appeal
- In office April 25, 1975 – December 31, 1978
- Preceded by: H. Welborn Ayres

Personal details
- Born: August 26, 1914 Doyline, Webster Parish, Louisiana, USA
- Died: March 25, 2002 (aged 87) Shreveport, Caddo Parish, Louisiana
- Party: Democratic
- Spouse: Mary Eloise Martin Bolin (m. 1937)
- Children: 4
- Education: Minden High School Louisiana State University Louisiana State University Law Center
- Occupation: Attorney

James Edwin Bolin Sr. (August 26, 1914 – March 25, 2002) was an American jurist and politician who served as a judge of the Louisiana Second Circuit Court of Appeal. He was a Democratic member of the Louisiana House of Representatives from Minden, the seat of government of Webster Parish in northwestern Louisiana.

== Legislator and soldier ==
Bolin was elected state representative when the one-term incumbent, Drayton Boucher of Springhill, ran successfully for the Louisiana State Senate. In the legislative runoff election, Bolin defeated former representative and Minden mayor J. Frank Colbert, 3,161 (57.3 percent) to 2,358 (42.7 percent).

== Judicial career ==
In 1956, Bolin defeated State Representative E. D. Gleason of Webster Parish, 2,503 to 912, for a seat at the proposed state constitutional convention. Because voters statewide rejected the calling of the convention, the election was moot.

== Honors ==
Bolin died in 2002 at the age of eighty-seven in an assisted living facility in Shreveport. He is honored through the naming of Bolin Hall at the Louisiana Army National Guard installation at Camp Minden, formerly part of the Louisiana Army Ammunition Plant.

Political offices
Preceded by Drayton Boucher	Louisiana State Representative for Webster Parish; 1940–1944	Succeeded by C.W. Thompson
Preceded by Arthur M. Wallace	District Attorney for Bossier and Webster parishes, Louisiana; 1948–1952	Succeeded by Louis H. Padgett, Jr.
Preceded by J. Frank McInnis	Louisiana 26th Judicial District Court Judge for Bossier and Webster parishes 1952–1960	Succeeded by O. E. Price; Enos McClendon
