= Lake Bistineau State Park =

State park in Louisiana, United States

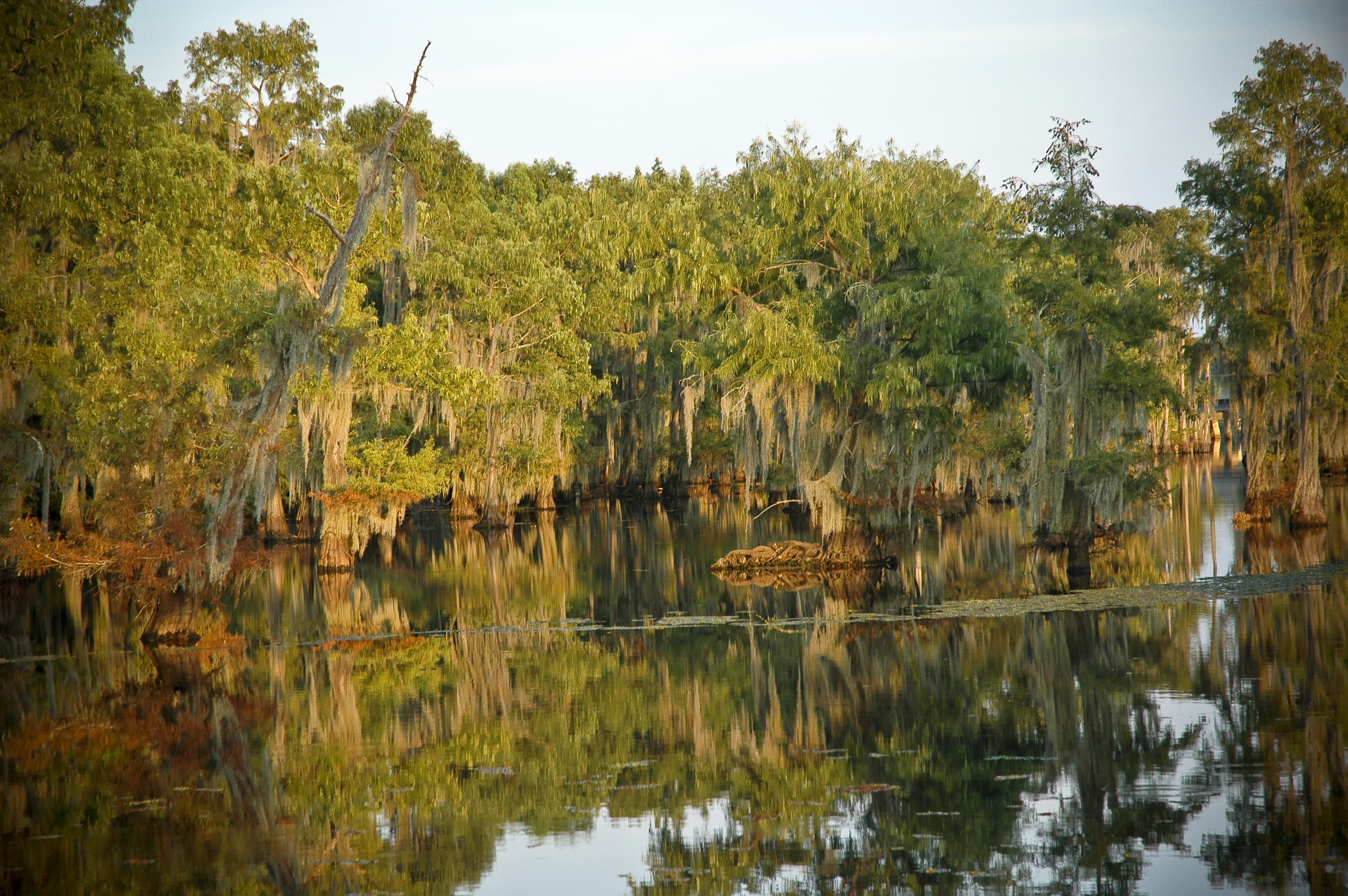
- Cypress trees in Lake Bistineau State Park.

- Location within Louisiana Location within the United States
- Location: Webster Parish, Louisiana, USA
- Coordinates: 32°26′24″N 93°23′40″W
- Area: 750 acres (304 ha)
- Established: 1938
- Visitors: 47,034 (in 2022)
- Governing body: Louisiana Office of State Parks
- Website: Official website

Lake Bistineau State Park is one of twenty-two state parks in the U.S. state of Louisiana. It is located in Doyline in Webster Parish, about a half hour east of Shreveport.

== History ==
Lake Bistineau was created by a flood after a log jam in 1800, but the lake gradually drained over time. In 1935, construction on a dam began, and the park was opened in 1938. It was the first state park to accommodate African Americans, with two separate areas of the modern-day park reflecting the historical segregated nature of the park.

== Activities ==
Lake Bistineau State Park offers over 10 miles of hiking trails, as well and camping, boating, paddling, and various other outdoor activities.
