= Louisiana Army Ammunition Plant =

American munitions plant

Coordinates: 32°33′31″N 93°23′54″W

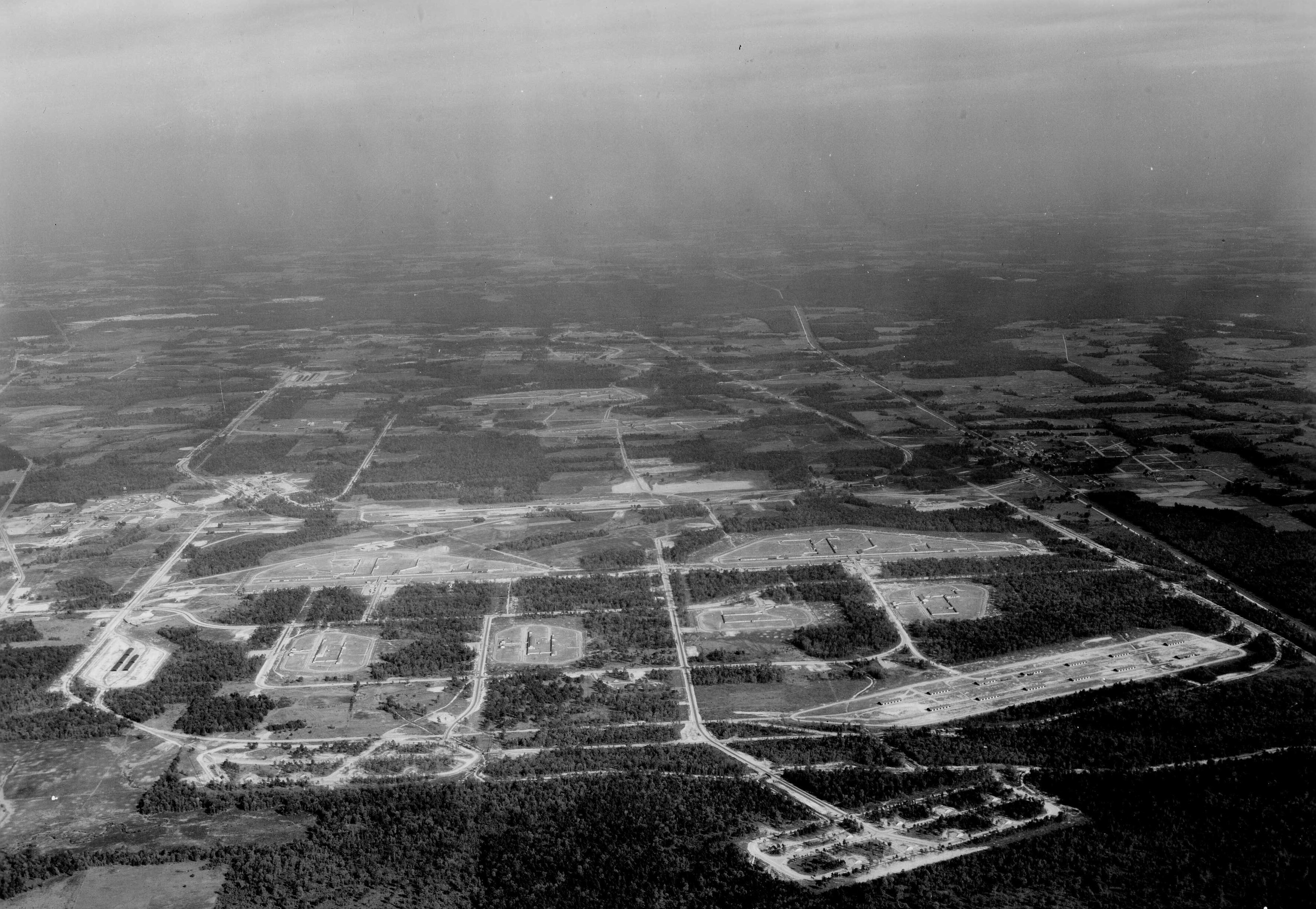
- Louisiana Army Ammunition Plant in 1942
- Active: 1942–1996; Now known as Camp Minden, a training center of the Louisiana Army National Guard with some areas leased to commercial businesses.
- Country: United States
- Role: Munitions plant
- Location: Webster Parish, Louisiana, USA
- Nickname: "The Shell Plant"
- Website: https://www.jmc.army.mil/

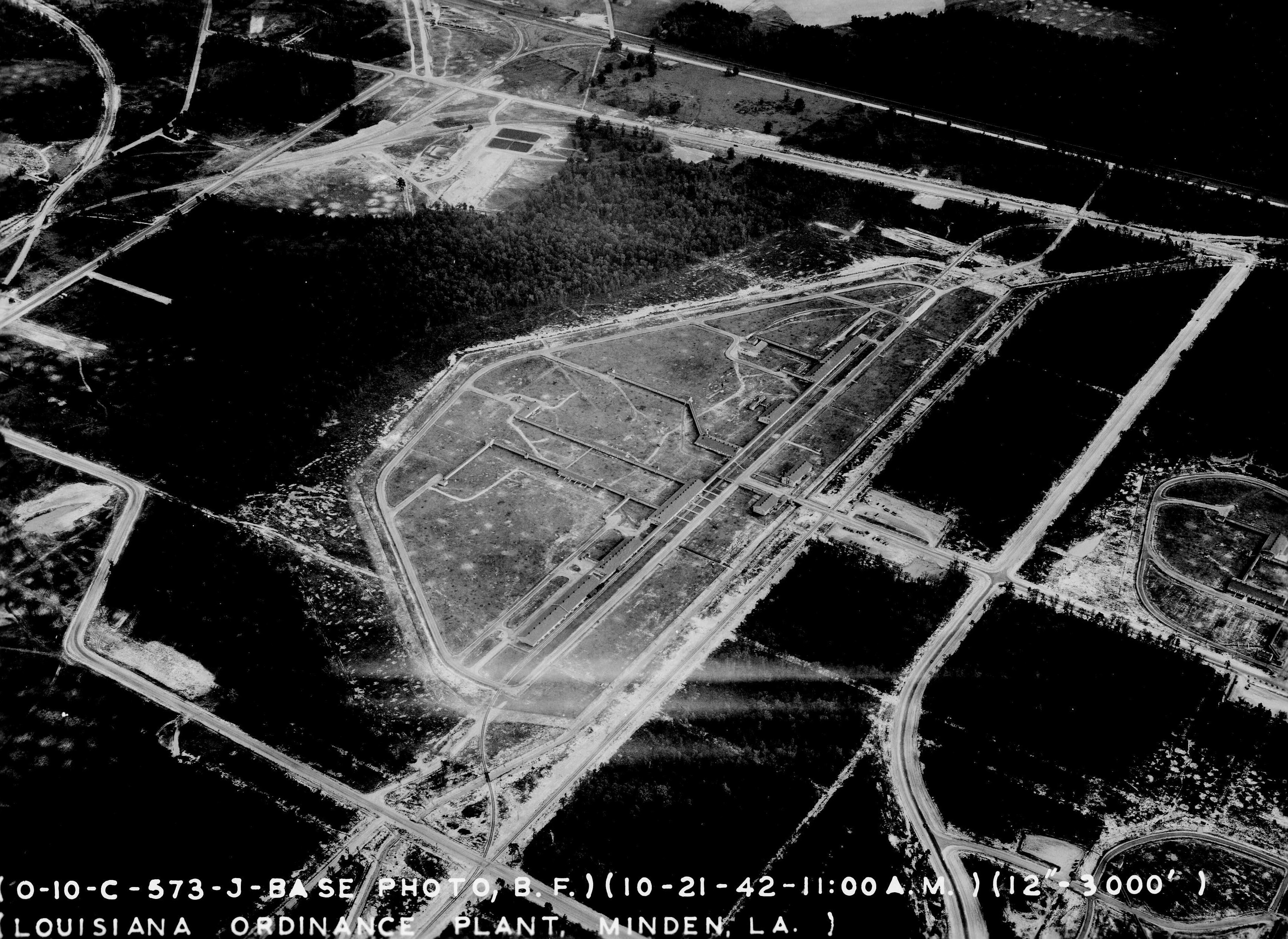
Aerial view, 1942

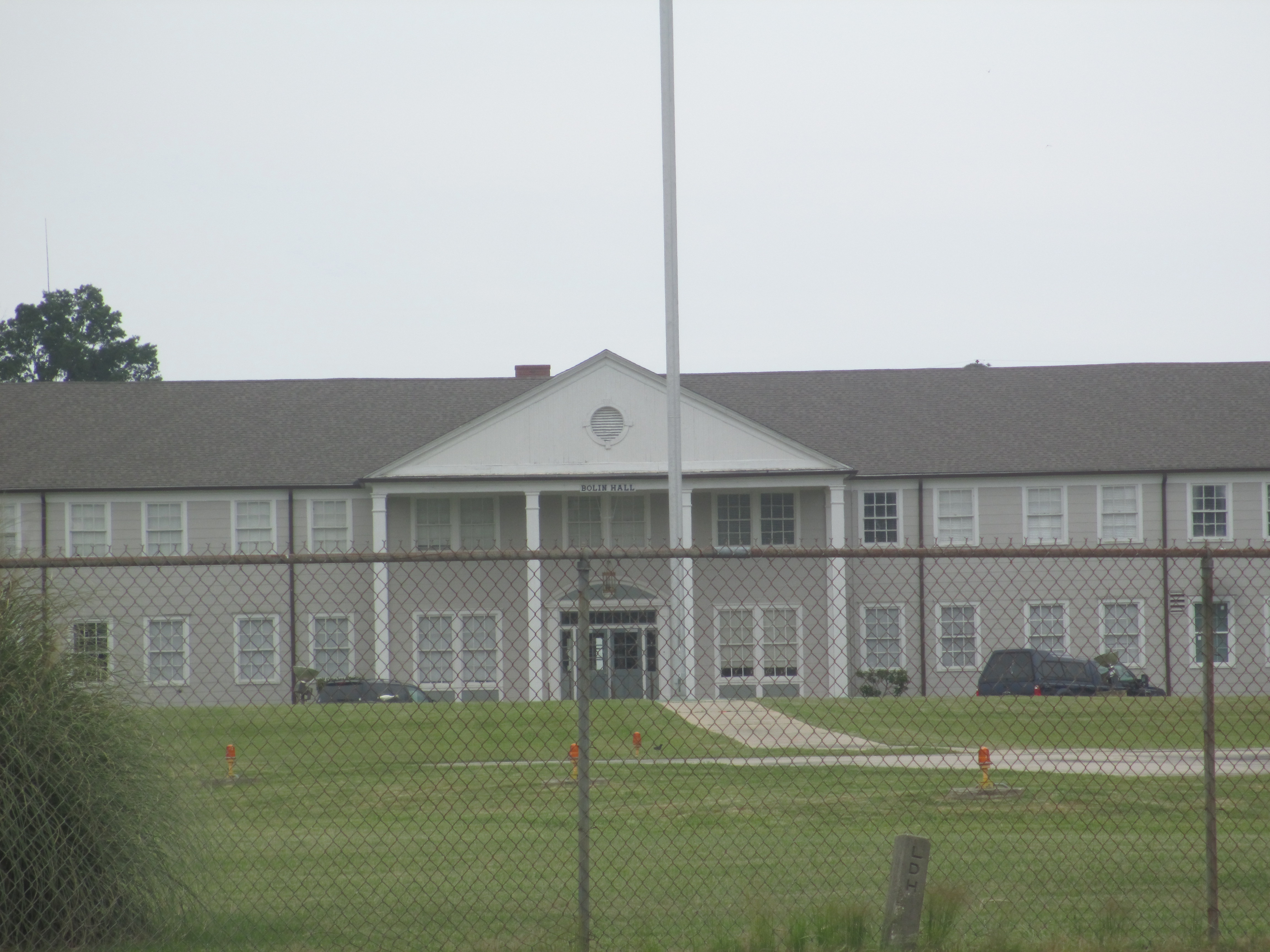
Bolin Hall, still under tight security, is the former LAAP building most visible off U.S. Highway 80 west of Minden, Louisiana. Now headquarters for the Louisiana Army National Guard, the structure is named for the late Judge James E. Bolin.

The Louisiana Army Ammunition Plant, formerly known as the Louisiana Ordnance Plant or as The Shell Plant, is an inactive 14,974-acre (60.60 km^{2}) plant to load, assemble and pack ammunitions items. During production from 1942 to 1994, the Army disposed of untreated explosives-laden wastewater in on-site lagoons, contaminating soil, sediments and groundwater with hazardous chemicals. It is a State of Louisiana government-owned, Louisiana Military Department operated facility located off U.S. Highway 80 in Webster Parish near Doyline between Minden and Bossier City, Louisiana. The former LAAP was turned over to the State of Louisiana from the federal government in 2005 and is now known as Camp Minden Training Site, a training center for the Louisiana Army National Guard. LAAP and Camp Minden have become interchangeable terms, with most references to Camp Minden.

== Environmental contamination ==
On March 31, 1989, LAAP was listed as a Superfund site on the National Priorities List. The United States Environmental Protection Agency found that the ground water was contaminated by explosive wastes including cyclotrimethylenetrinitramine (RDX) and trinitrotoluene (TNT).

On August 24, 2006, an explosion of the Explo Systems, Inc., site leased at Camp Minden, where bombs were disassembled and recycled led to the evacuation of six hundred pupils nearby but caused no injuries or fatalities.

In October 2012, a large explosion of 15 million pounds of M6 propellant, of the Explo Systems, Inc. site, rocked Camp Minden. The explosion shattered windows 4 miles away and created a 7,000-foot mushroom cloud contaminating the area.

In December 2012, police began to remove 2,700 tons of explosives haphazardly stashed in warehouses and in open air from the Explo Systems site leading to evacuations from nearby Doyline. After materials had been relocated into buildings within Camp Minden, Explo Systems, Inc. filed bankruptcy, and in August 2013 abandoned the materials

=== M6 propellant disposal ===
In October, 2014 EPA, the Louisiana Department of Environmental Quality and the Army agreed to dispose of explosive M6 propellant by "open burn", in "prepared trays containing a shallow layer of the material, [as] has been used in other cleanups."

In May 2015, EPA in conjunction with a Citizens' Advisory Group announced, that a contained burn system in the form of an incinerator would be used. The plan was to dismantle the incinerator and remove it after burns would be finished. To oversee the cleanup, the EPA charged about $8 million on top of $1.2 million which the state of Louisiana had already paid. In June 2015, Explo Systems executives asked a state judge to throw out charges, because M6 was not classified as explosive in Louisiana. The Army intended to dispose of the explosives through "open burns".

Eventually a private facility in Colfax, Louisiana 95 miles south, operated by Clean Harbors was chosen. It is "the only commercial facility in the nation allowed to burn explosives and munitions waste with no environmental emissions controls."
