= Intheoaks =

- U.S. National Register of Historic Places
- U.S. Historic district
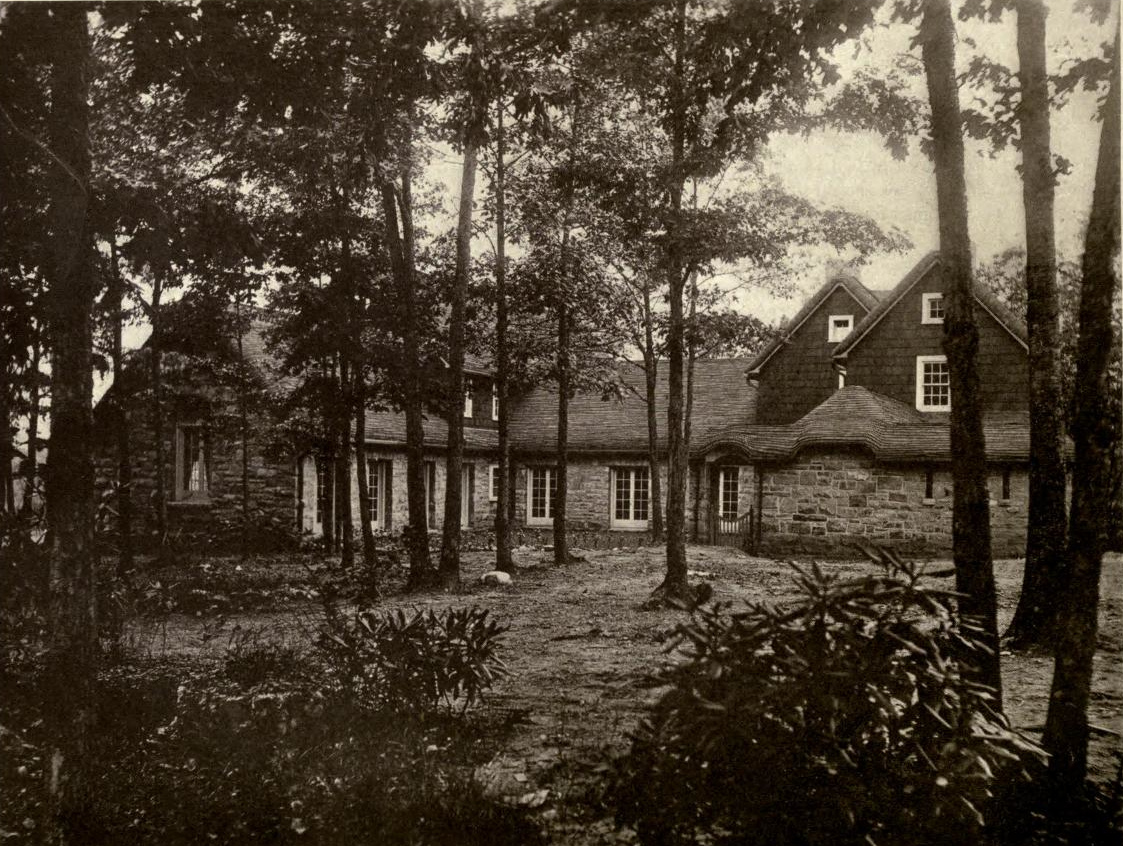

- Location within North Carolina Location within the United States
- Location: 510 Vance Ave., Black Mountain, North Carolina
- Coordinates: 35°36′40″N 82°19′40″W
- Area: 71.8 acres (29.1 ha)
- Built: 1921-1923
- Architect: Wallis, Frank E.; Smith, Richard Sharp; Smith and Carrier; Beadle, Chauncey; Et al.
- Architectural style: Tudor Revival
- NRHP reference No.: 91000361
- Added to NRHP: April 10, 1991

Intheoaks, also known as In-the-oaks, is a historic estate and a national historic district located at Black Mountain, Buncombe County, North Carolina. The district encompasses nine contributing buildings, two contributing sites, seven contributing structures, and four contributing objects associated with a country estate of the 1920s. The main house was built in 1921–1923, and is a four-level, U-shaped Tudor country manor house with an oblique wing. It was designed by New York architect Frank E. Wallis, with a large recreation wing containing a ballroom, gymnasium, bowling alley, and indoor swimming pool designed by architect Richard Sharp Smith. Also on the property are the contributing Caretaker's Cottage (1923), agricultural and service outbuildings, main entrance gates designed by Smith and Carrier (1922), and landscape designed by noted landscape architect Chauncey Beadle The property is known as Camp Henry, a camp for young people and the Episcopal Diocese of Western North Carolina offices are located on the estate.

It was listed on the National Register of Historic Places in 1991.
