= Shadow House =

Plantation house in Webster Parish, Louisiana

Coordinates: 32°33′39″N 93°14′54″W

Shadow House, also known as Ivy Vale and Sunnyside Plantation, is a historic plantation house near the village of Dubberly in Webster Parish, Louisiana. The house is the oldest wooden structure in North Louisiana and is listed on the National Register of Historic Places.

== History ==
The first structure on the property was a twenty-foot-by-twenty-five-foot one-room log cabin, built in 1816 by the Robert Byas family.

In 1850, the property was purchased by the planters Calvin Leary and Hepsey Leary, who moved there with their family and twenty-three slaves. Calvin Leary, originally from North Carolina, owned land in Bienville Parish and in Houston County, Georgia. He used the logs from the original cabin to build a larger dogtrot house. As his wealth grew, Leary added on porches to the front and back of the house and an elle addition, in the Greek Revival style, including a formal dining room and parlor. He renamed the estate Sunnyside Plantation. The plantation used the labor of enslaved people to produce cotton, wheat, peaches, and pecans, and raised pigs, for salt pork, and chicken.

Leary fathered multiple children by Mariah, a woman he enslaved, during the twelve years that he was a widower. He sold the property in the 1870s.

The plantation was purchased by W.R. Shadow in 1902, who operated the Dixie Nursery there, one of the largest plant nurseries in the Southern United States. He was known for his cultivation of pecan trees, camellias, roses, fruit trees, and evergreens. Shadow closed off the dogtrot and added a dormer upstairs to the house.

The property is a private residence owned by Denton Culpepper. He started restoring the property in 2017. He renamed the property Ivy Vale. It is the oldest wooden structure in North Louisiana and is listed on the National Register of Historic Places.
