= Dubberly, Louisiana =

- Village
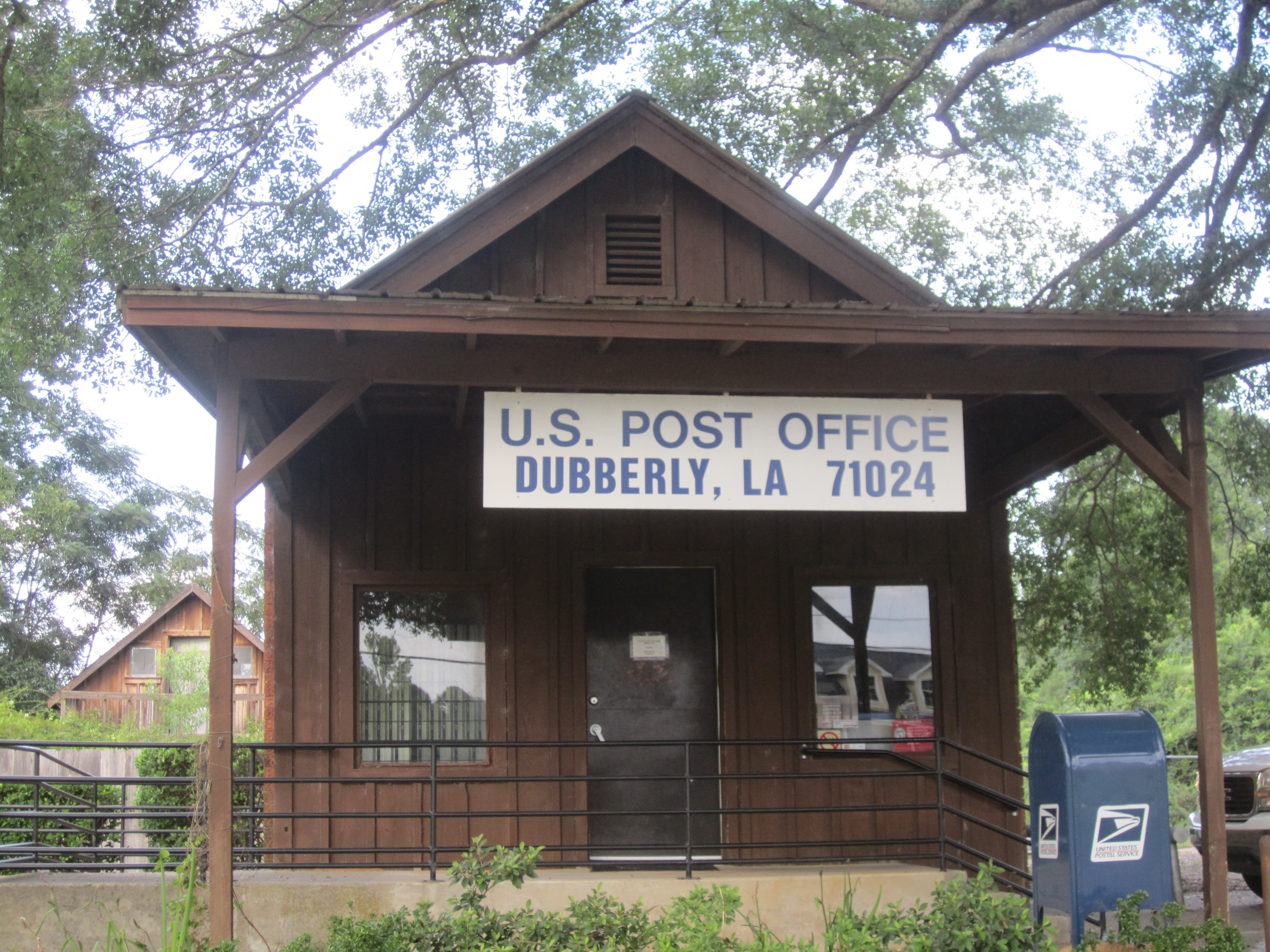
- U.S. Post Office in Dubberly

- Location of Dubberly in Webster Parish, Louisiana.

- Location of Louisiana in the United States
- Coordinates: 32°32′28″N 93°14′36″W
- Country: United States
- State: Louisiana
- Parish: Webster

Area
  - Total: 3.95 sq mi (10.22 km^{2})
  - Land: 3.94 sq mi (10.20 km^{2})
  - Water: 0.0077 sq mi (0.02 km^{2})
- Elevation: 262 ft (80 m)

Population (2020)
  - Total: 250
  - Density: 63.5/sq mi (24.51/km^{2})
- Time zone: UTC-6 (CST)
  - Summer (DST): UTC-5 (CDT)
- Area code: 318
- FIPS code: 22-21835
- GNIS feature ID: 2407445

Dubberly is a village in Webster Parish, Louisiana, United States. As of the 2020 census, Dubberly had a population of 250. It is part of the Minden Micropolitan Statistical Area.

The largest plant nursery in the south, Dixie nursery, was operated at Shadow House in Dubberly.

== Geography ==
According to the United States Census Bureau, the village has a total area of 3.9 square miles (10 km^{2}), all land.

== Demographics ==
Historical population
Census	Pop.	Note	%±
1960	249		—
1970	212		−14.9%
1980	421		98.6%
1990	253		−39.9%
2000	290		14.6%
2010	273		−5.9%
2020	250		−8.4%
2025 (est.)	238	▼	−4.8%
U.S. Decennial Census

As of the census of 2000, there were 290 people, 120 households, and 90 families residing in the village. The population density was 73.8 inhabitants per square mile (28.5/km^{2}). There were 143 housing units at an average density of 36.4 per square mile (14.1/km^{2}). The racial makeup of the village was 88.97% White, 10.00% African American, 0.34% Native American, and 0.69% from two or more races. Hispanic or Latino of any race were 2.41% of the population.

There were 120 households, out of which 26.7% had children under the age of 18 living with them, 67.5% were married couples living together, 7.5% had a female householder with no husband present, and 24.2% were non-families. 23.3% of all households were made up of individuals, and 12.5% had someone living alone who was 65 years of age or older. The average household size was 2.42 and the average family size was 2.86.

In the village, the population was spread out, with 20.3% under the age of 18, 9.0% from 18 to 24, 23.1% from 25 to 44, 31.4% from 45 to 64, and 16.2% who were 65 years of age or older. The median age was 43 years. For every 100 females, there were 90.8 males. For every 100 females age 18 and over, there were 87.8 males.

The median income for a household in the village was $40,417, and the median income for a family was $48,000. Males had a median income of $26,985 versus $30,333 for females. The per capita income for the village was $18,284. About 4.4% of families and 8.4% of the population were below the poverty line, including 5.9% of those under the age of eighteen and 18.0% of those 65 or over.

== Infrastructure ==
The Joshua B. Tomlinson Interchange at Interstate 20 and Louisiana State Highway 531 between Minden and Dubberly was dedicated in honor of United States Army sergeant Joshua Tomlinson, who was killed in the line of duty in Operation Enduring Freedom in Afghanistan.

Another interchange to the west on Interstate 20 at the Minden-Sibley exit is named for Iraq War hero, Army Sgt. Joshua B. Madden.

== Notable people ==
Former Governor Robert F. Kennon was born in Dubberly in 1902 but reared in Minden. James Burton, a popular rock and roll/Country music guitarist, was born in Dubberly in 1939.

Nicholas J. Sandlin, a farmer, lawyer, journalist, district attorney, Webster Parish police juror, state representative, postmaster, Confederate States Army officer and prisoner of war, lived on a plantation near Dubberly in the 1850s. Another state representative from Dubberly, Irvin Talton, held the seat from 1880 to 1884 and was earlier a member of the Webster Parish Police Jury.
