= Alden Bryan House =

Historic house in Iowa, United States

- U.S. National Register of Historic Places
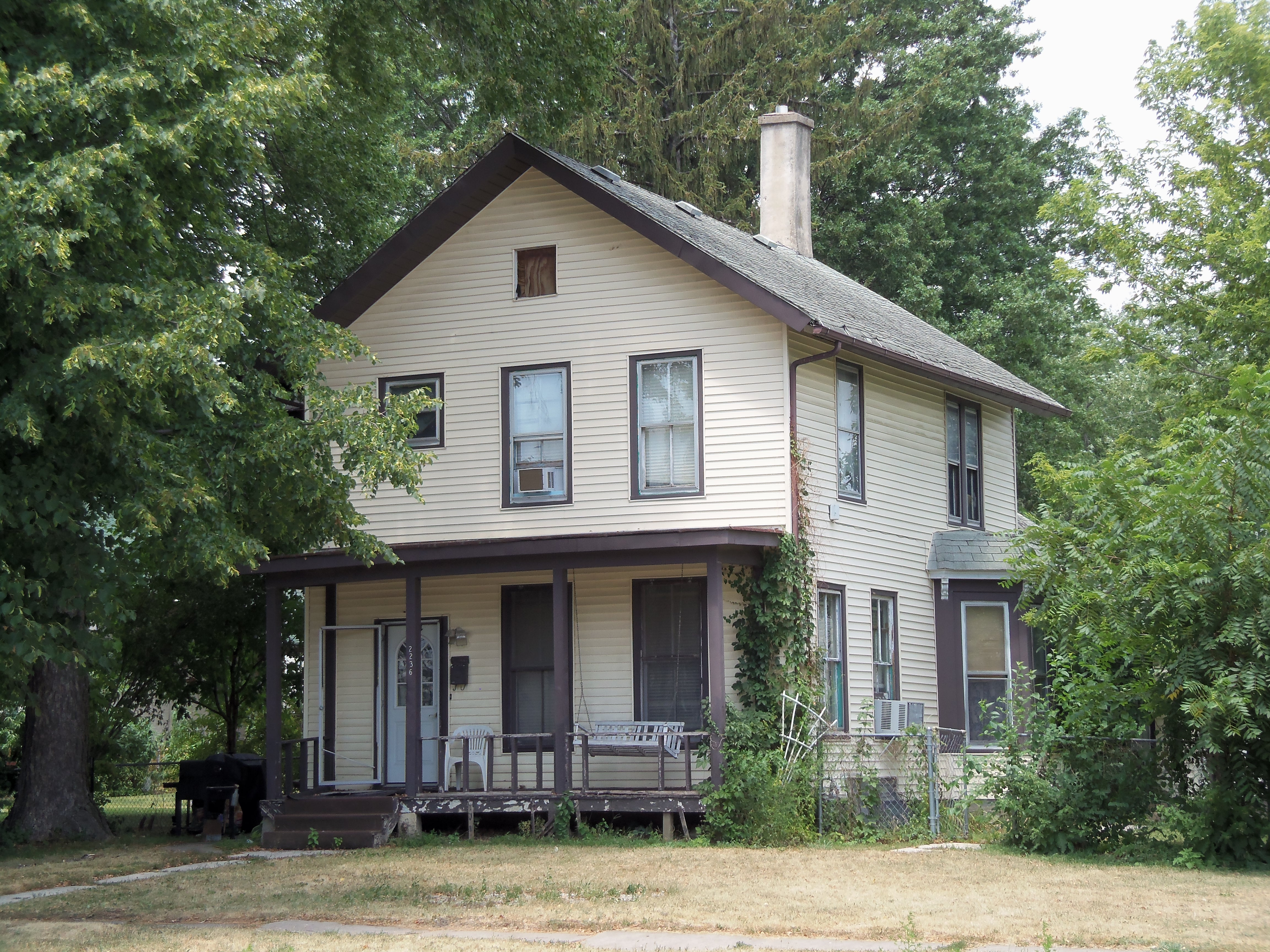

- Location within Iowa Location within the United States
- Location: 2236 W. 3rd St. Davenport, Iowa
- Coordinates: 41°31′21″N 90°36′31″W
- Area: less than one acre
- Built: 1870
- Architectural style: Greek Revival
- MPS: Davenport MRA
- NRHP reference No.: 83002405
- Added to NRHP: July 7, 1983

The Alden Bryan House is a historic building located in the West End of Davenport, Iowa, United States. The residence has been listed on the National Register of Historic Places since 1983.

== History ==
The provenance of this house is not entirely clear as addresses in the city directory of this time period are unclear. It is possible that Alden Bryan built the house in 1870. He worked for the Chicago, Rock Island and Pacific Railroad, and intermittently, as a farmer. Herman Balschmitter bought this property in 1876 and he too could have built the house. He also could have lived in an adjacent house. Balschmitter worked as a tailor and a photographer.

== Architecture ==
The Bryan House is a vernacular, Greek Revival style structure also known as the McClelland or German house type. They are found throughout the older sections of Davenport. It is somewhat unusual, however, because it retains its original clapboards and window details. At the time of its historic designation, it also had retained its porch posts and brackets, but those have subsequently been replaced.
