= Bryan House No. 2 =

Historic house in Arkansas, United States

- Formerly listed on the U.S. National Register of Historic Places
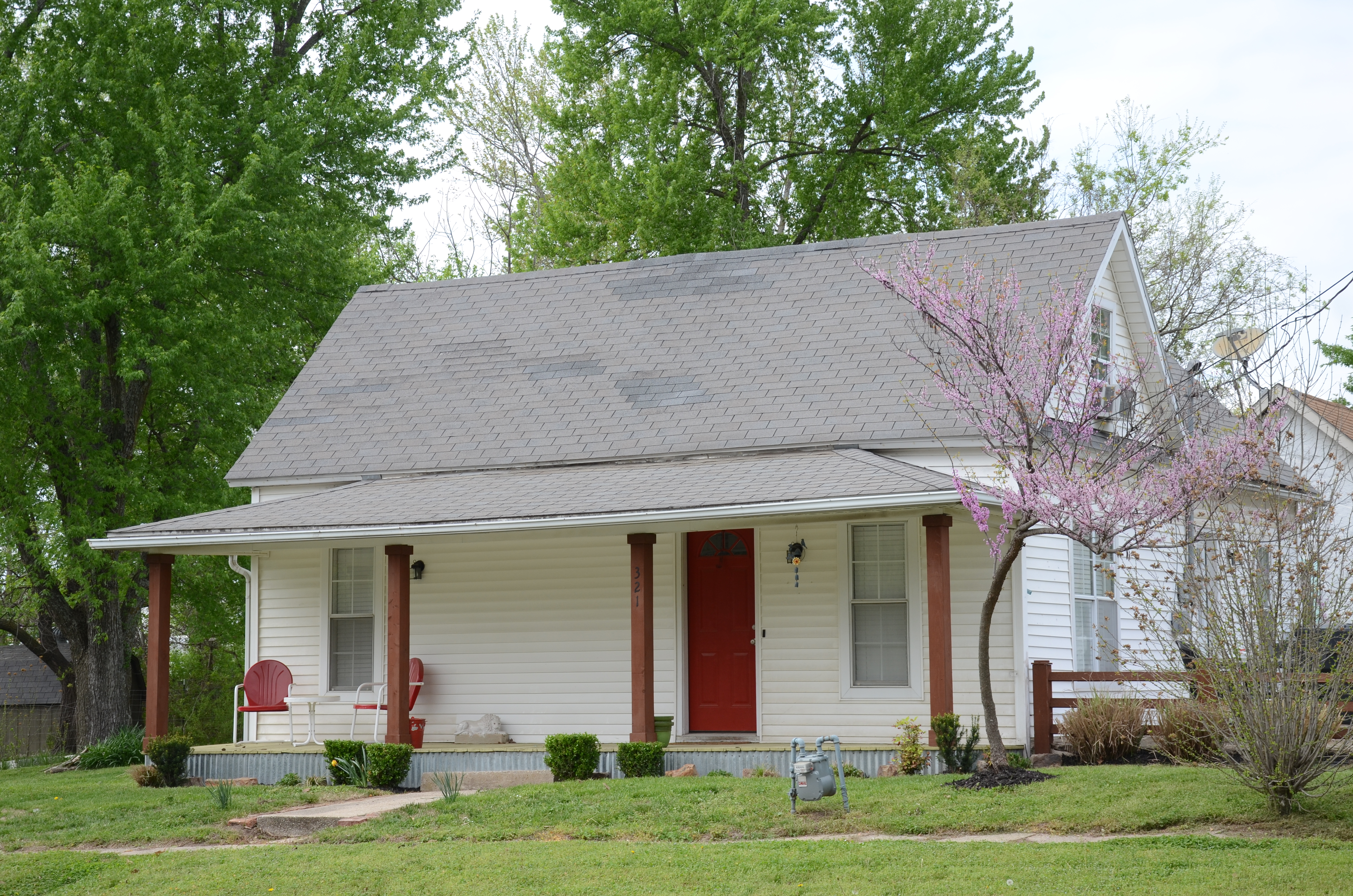

- Location within Arkansas Location within the United States
- Location: 321 E. Locust St., Rogers, Arkansas
- Coordinates: 36°20′7″N 94°6′43″W
- Area: less than one acre
- Built: 1900
- Architectural style: Double-Pen;Duple
- MPS: Benton County MRA
- NRHP reference No.: 87002396

Significant dates
- Added to NRHP: January 28, 1988
- Removed from NRHP: October 7, 2026

The Bryan House No. 2 is a historic duplex house at 321 East Locust Street in Rogers, Arkansas, United States. It is a single-story double pen frame structure, with a side gable roof. A one-story ell extends to the rear on one side. A porch with turned columns extends the full width of the structure, sheltering the two main entrances. Built c. 1900, this is the best-preserved of a modest number of surviving houses of this type in Rogers, which were once much more numerous.

The house was listed on the National Register of Historic Places in 1988.

== See also ==
- National Register of Historic Places listings in Benton County, Arkansas
