= Union Church (Sibley, Louisiana) =

Historic church in Louisiana, United States

- U.S. National Register of Historic Places
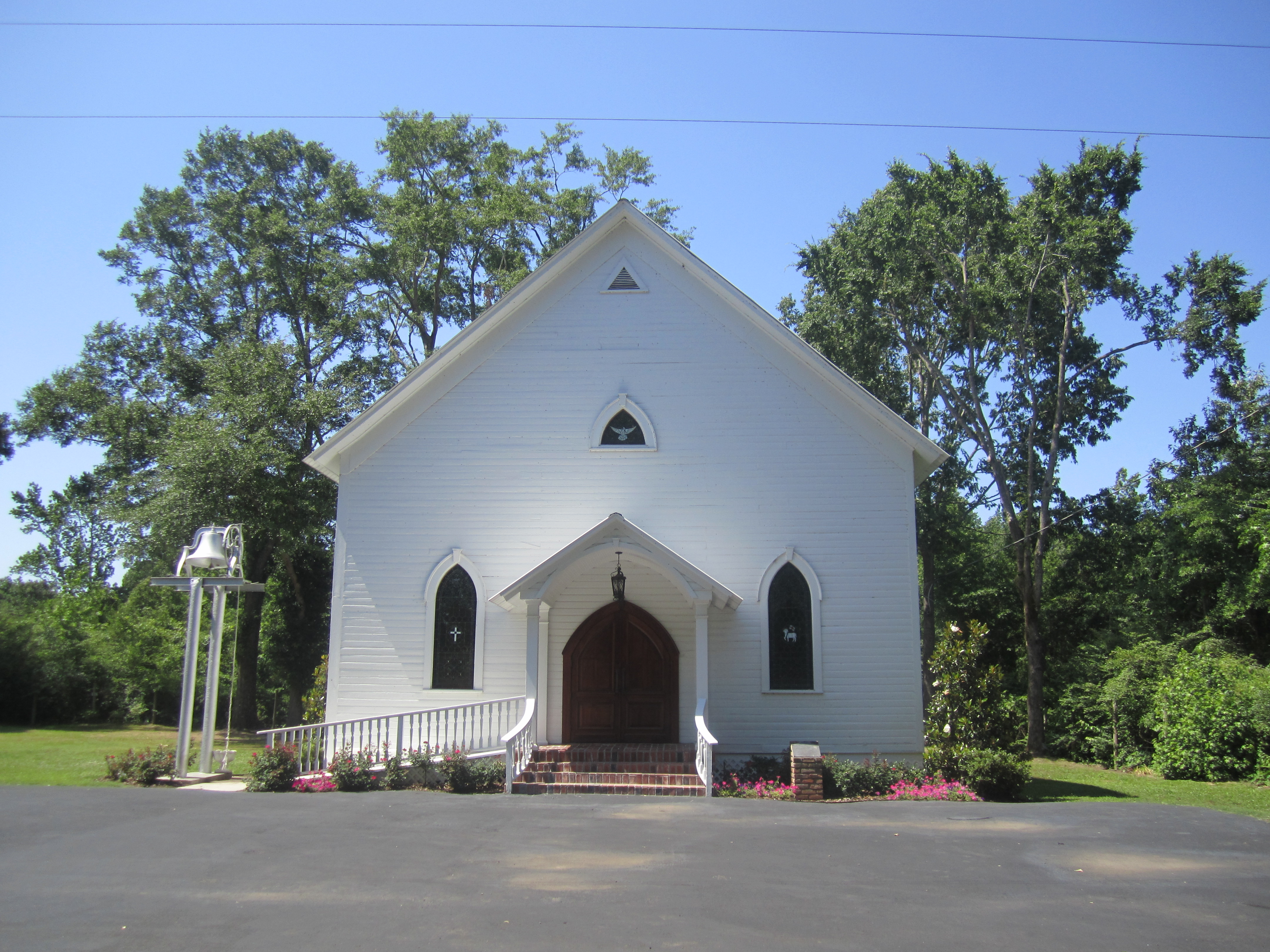
- The Yellow Pine Christian Church, or Union Church, located south of Sibley, Louisiana, was established in 1902. It was added in 1996 to the National Register of Historic Places.

- Location within Louisiana Location within the United States
- Nearest city: Sibley, Louisiana
- Coordinates: 32°28′39″N 93°19′22″W
- Area: Less than one acre
- Architectural style: Gothic Revival
- NRHP reference No.: 94001562
- Added to NRHP: January 25, 1995

Union Church (also known as Yellow Pine Church or Yellow Pine Christian Church) is a historic one-room church south of Sibley in Webster Parish in northwestern Louisiana, United States.

It was built in a Gothic Revival style and in 1996 was added to the National Register of Historic Places.

In 2013, the congregation initiated the construction of a second building for Sunday school rooms and a fellowship hall.
