= Bryan House (Doyline, Louisiana) =

Historic house in Louisiana, United States

- U.S. National Register of Historic Places
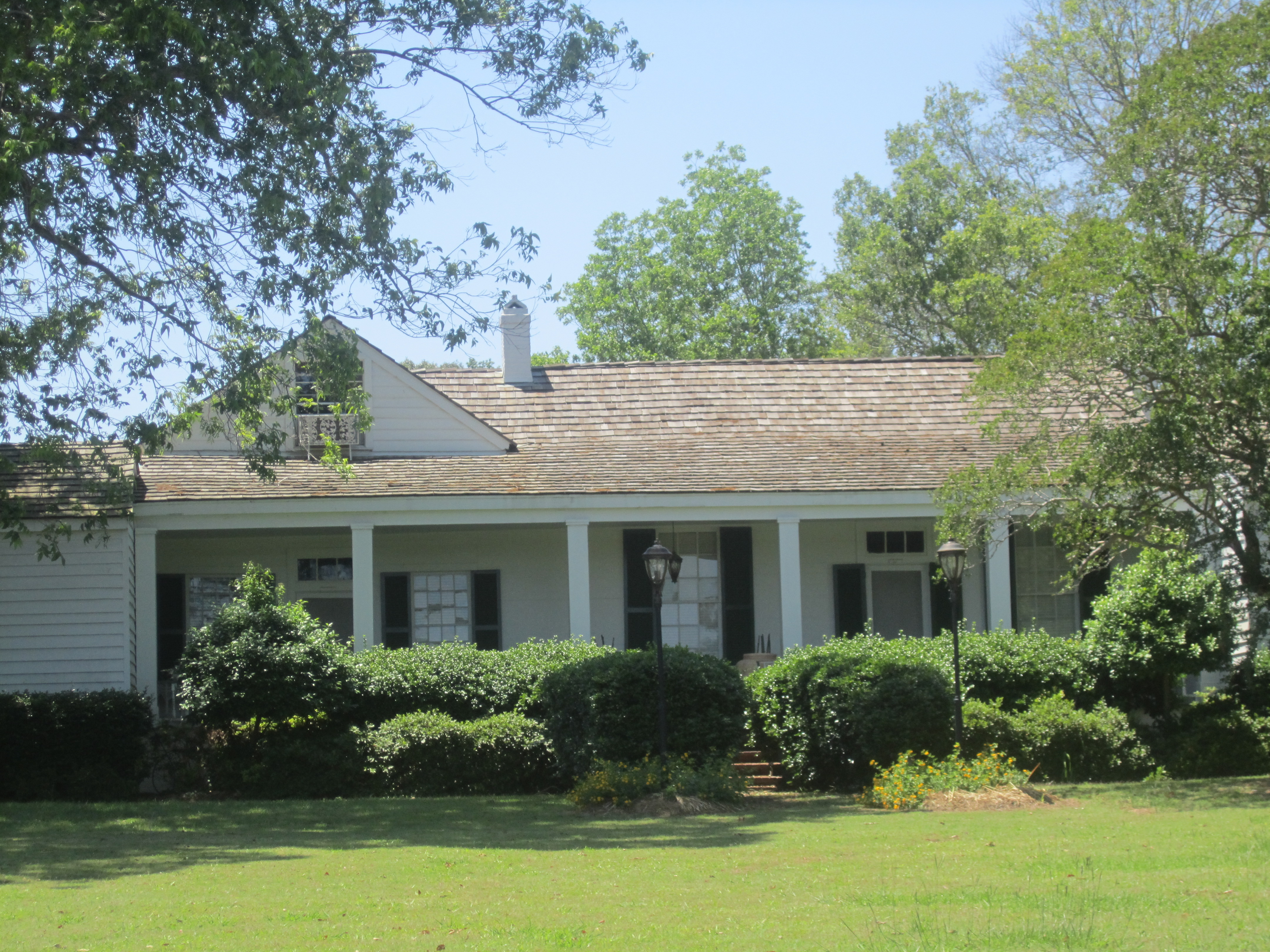

- Location within Louisiana Location within the United States
- Location: 2086 Harold Montgomery Rd., near Doyline in Webster Parish, Louisiana
- Coordinates: 32°28′13″N 93°25′34″W
- Built: c.1835
- Architectural style: Federal, Log dogtrot
- NRHP reference No.: 99001037
- Added to NRHP: August 27, 1999

The Bryan House near Doyline, Louisiana was built in about 1835. It has also been known as Plant House and as Ranch Azalee. It was listed on the National Register of Historic Places in 1999.

It was built originally as a one-and-a-half-story log dogtrot structure. It was expanded 10 or 20 years later and included vernacular Federal and Greek Revival details.

The home was destroyed by fire on April 7, 2021.It is suspected that lightning caused the fire.
