= Bryan Manor =

Archaeological site in Virginia, United States

- U.S. National Register of Historic Places
- Virginia Landmarks Register
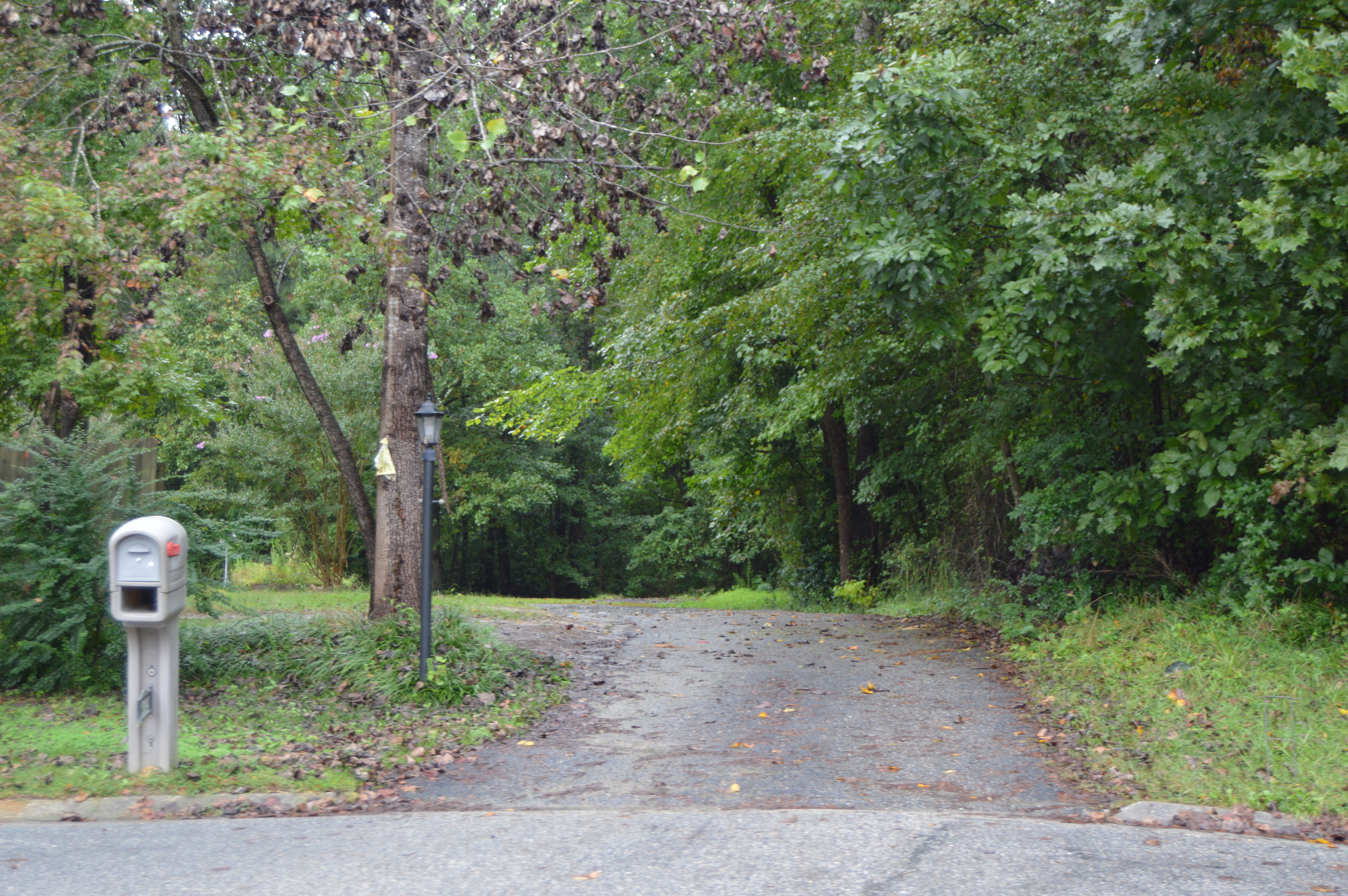
- Site entrance
- Nearest city: Williamsburg, Virginia
- Area: 10 acres (4.0 ha)
- Built: 1757
- NRHP reference No.: 78003048
- VLR No.: 099-0065

Significant dates
- Added to NRHP: November 14, 1978
- Designated VLR: June 21, 1977

Bryan Manor is a historic archaeological site located near Williamsburg, York County, Virginia. It is the site of a plantation established by Frederick Bryan after purchasing a 500-acre plot in 1757. A map by the French cartographer Desandrouin in 1781–1782 indicated a complex of five buildings. A survey in 1976 identified an unusual footing of bog iron bonded with shell mortar. Also on the site is the stone slab over the grave of John Bryan, one-year-old son of Frederick Bryan, who died in 1760.

It was added to the National Register of Historic Places in 1978.
