= William Jennings Bryan House (Asheville, North Carolina) =

Historic house in North Carolina, United States

- U.S. National Register of Historic Places
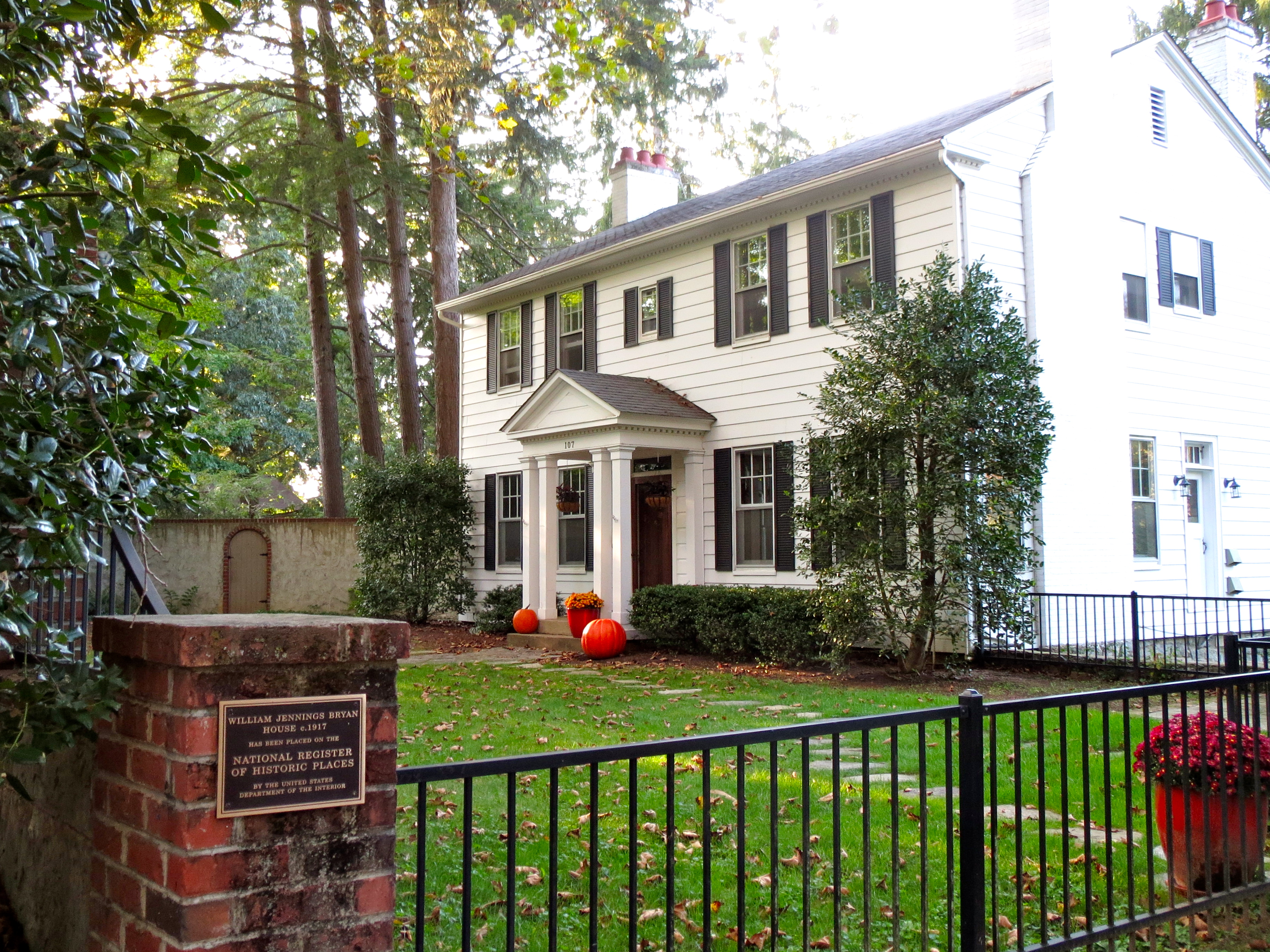

- Location within North Carolina Location within the United States
- Location: 107 Evelyn Pl., Asheville, North Carolina
- Coordinates: 35°36′45″N 82°33′2″W
- Area: 0.6 acres (0.24 ha)
- Built: 1917
- Architect: Smith & Carrier
- Architectural style: Colonial Revival
- NRHP reference No.: 83001836
- Added to NRHP: June 23, 1983

The William Jennings Bryan House is a historic home located at 107 Evelyn Pl. in Asheville, Buncombe County, North Carolina. It was designed by architects Smith & Carrier and built in 1917. It is a two-story, five-bay, side-gable roofed dwelling in the Colonial Revival style. This was the home of William Jennings Bryan from 1917 until he sold the house in 1920.

It was listed on the National Register of Historic Places in 1983.
