= Doyline, Louisiana =

- Village
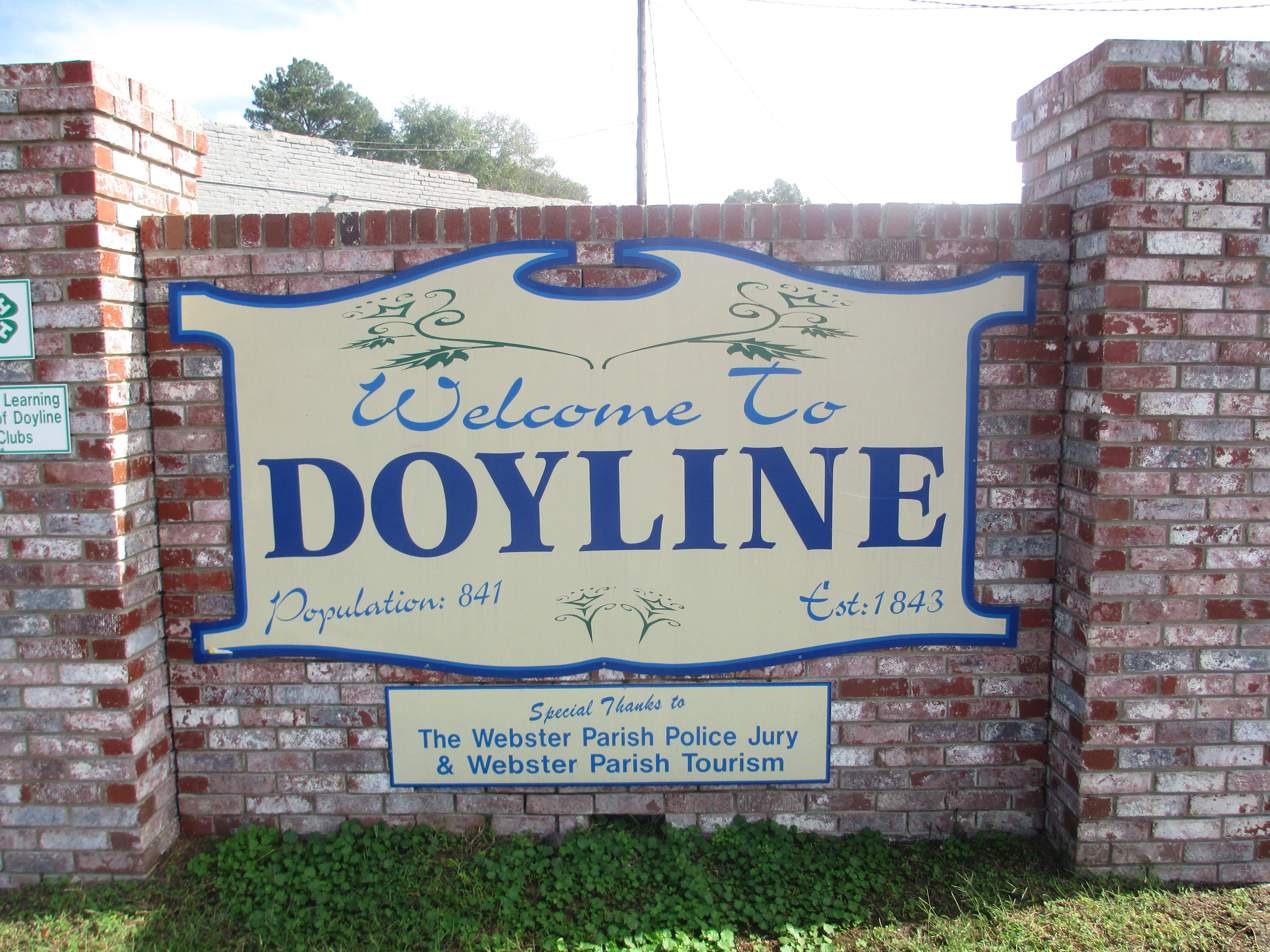

- Location of Doyline in Webster Parish, Louisiana.

- Location of Louisiana in the United States
- Coordinates: 32°31′30″N 93°24′42″W
- Country: United States
- State: Louisiana
- Parish: Webster

Area
  - Total: 3.34 sq mi (8.66 km^{2})
  - Land: 3.33 sq mi (8.62 km^{2})
  - Water: 0.015 sq mi (0.04 km^{2})
- Elevation: 203 ft (62 m)

Population (2020)
  - Total: 674
  - Density: 202.5/sq mi (78.18/km^{2})
- Time zone: UTC-6 (CST)
  - Summer (DST): UTC-5 (CDT)
- Area code: 318
- FIPS code: 22-21590
- GNIS feature ID: 2407443

Doyline is a village in southwestern Webster Parish in northwestern Louisiana, United States. As of the 2020 census, Doyline had a population of 674. It is part of the Minden Micropolitan Statistical Area.

Under a cited cost-saving realignment plan, the Webster Parish School Board closed Union Elementary School in Doyline in 2011, as Doyline High School absorbed the elementary students. Vandals broke windows in the abandoned elementary school, which contained asbestos and black mold. The building was hence razed at a cost of $99,000.

The HBO television series True Blood about vampires has a scene filmed in Doyline.

== History ==
Doyline is an entry point to Lake Bistineau and the Lake Bistineau State Park, a popular fishing destination and the reservoir of Dorcheat Bayou.

The Doyline High School Panthers won their state basketball championship in 1967, and two of the players pursued athletic careers. Tommy Joe Eagles played for Louisiana Tech University in Ruston and became the head basketball coach for the Louisiana Tech Bulldogs from 1985 to 1989 and the Auburn Tigers in Alabama from 1989 to 1994. Shortly before his death of a heart attack, Eagles had been named coach of the University of New Orleans Privateers men's basketball team, His teammate, James Ponder "Jimmy" Stewart (1949-2017), later played baseball for Northwestern State University in Natchitoches, Louisiana, and until sidelined by a shoulder injury the California Angels organization. In the early 1980s, Stewart coached basketball and was the pitching coach on three state championship baseball teams at Minden High School. He was from 1985 to 2005 the principal of Doyline High School. He died at the age of sixty-eight of long-term effects a stroke.

On August 24, 2006, an explosion of the Explo Systems, Inc., site at Camp Minden led to the evacuation of six hundred students nearby but caused no injuries or fatalities. The site is a former U.S. Army ammunition plant where military bombs were disassembled and recycled.

In December 2012, police began the removal of 2,700 tons of explosives from Camp Minden, located at the site of the former Louisiana Army Ammunition Plant, leading to evacuations from nearby Doyline.

In 2017, Steven T. Bridwell, a Democratic member of the Doyline Town Council, was appointed mayor on the resignation of Gary Carter (No Party) after his arrest for domestic abuse. Bridwell was succeeded on the council by Crystal "Christie" Carter Gates. A special election for both positions will be held in October 2017.

== Geography ==
According to the United States Census Bureau, the village has a total area of 3.3 square miles (8.5 km^{2}), all land.

== Demographics ==
Historical population
Census	Pop.	Note	%±
1950	1,170		—
1960	1,061		−9.3%
1970	716		−32.5%
1980	801		11.9%
1990	884		10.4%
2000	841		−4.9%
2010	818		−2.7%
2020	674		−17.6%
2025 (est.)	646	▼	−4.2%
U.S. Decennial Census

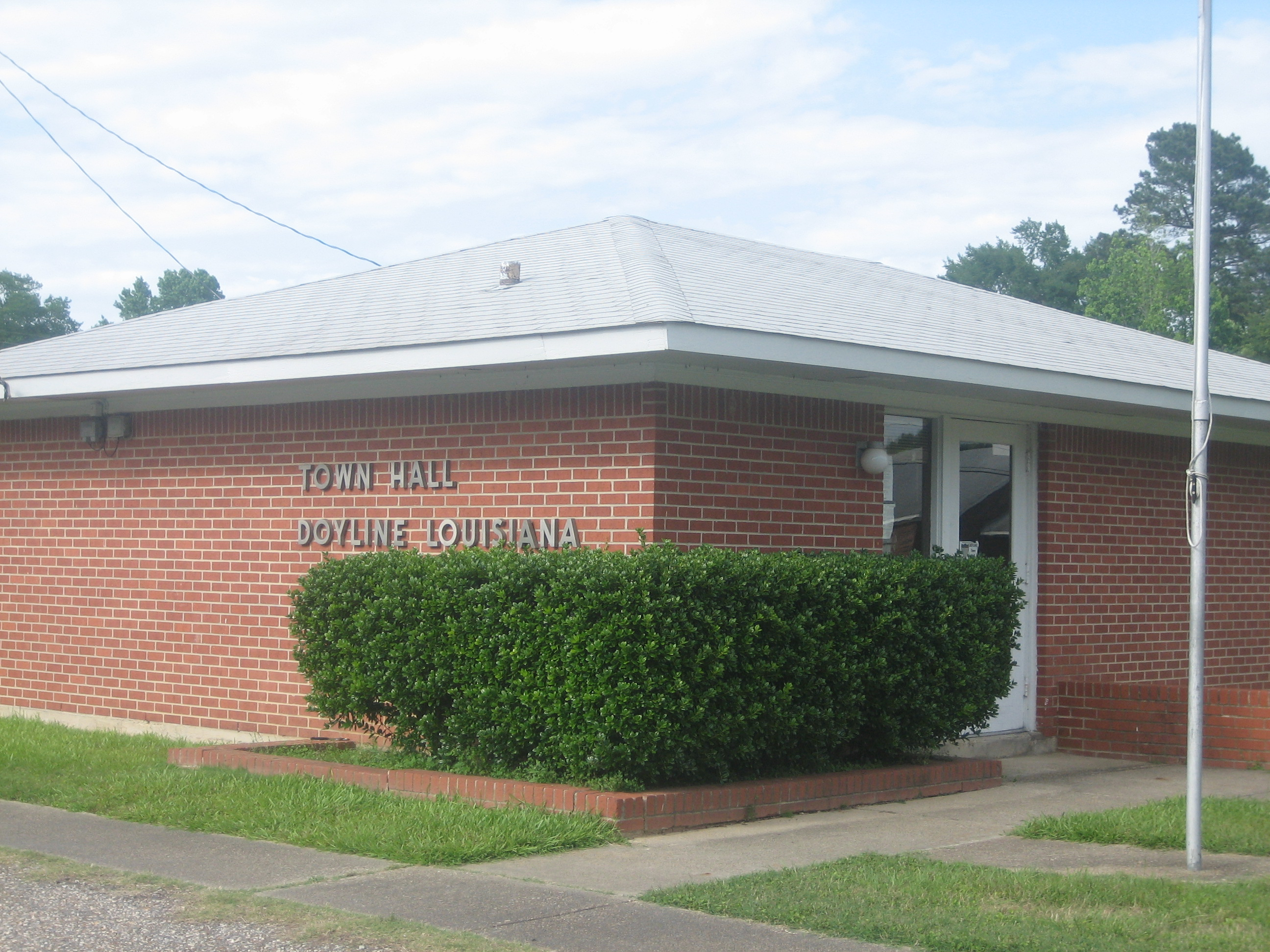
Town Hall in Doyline

As of the census of 2000, there were 841 people, 325 households, and 235 families residing in the village. The population density was 252.5 inhabitants per square mile (97.5/km^{2}). There were 359 housing units at an average density of 107.8 per square mile (41.6/km^{2}). The racial makeup of the village was 79.90% White, 17.12% African American, 0.12% Asian, 0.12% from other races, and 2.73% from two or more races. Hispanic or Latino of any race were 0.71% of the population.

There were 325 households, out of which 32.6% had children under the age of 18 living with them, 53.8% were married couples living together, 15.7% had a female householder with no husband present, and 27.4% were non-families. 25.5% of all households were made up of individuals, and 12.0% had someone living alone who was 65 years of age or older. The average household size was 2.59 and the average family size was 3.08.

In the village, the population was spread out, with 26.0% under the age of 18, 12.1% from 18 to 24, 25.8% from 25 to 44, 23.4% from 45 to 64, and 12.6% who were 65 years of age or older. The median age was 35 years. For every 100 females, there were 93.8 males. For every 100 females age 18 and over, there were 88.5 males.

The median income for a household in the village was $34,063, and the median income for a family was $36,875. Males had a median income of $30,536 versus $21,563 for females. The per capita income for the village was $16,218. About 12.4% of families and 18.9% of the population were below the poverty line, including 34.7% of those under age 18 and 15.1% of those age 65 or over.

== Notable people ==
- James E. Bolin (1914–2002), judge and politician
- Tommy Joe Eagles (1949-1994), college basketball coach
