= Bank of Webster =

- U.S. National Register of Historic Places
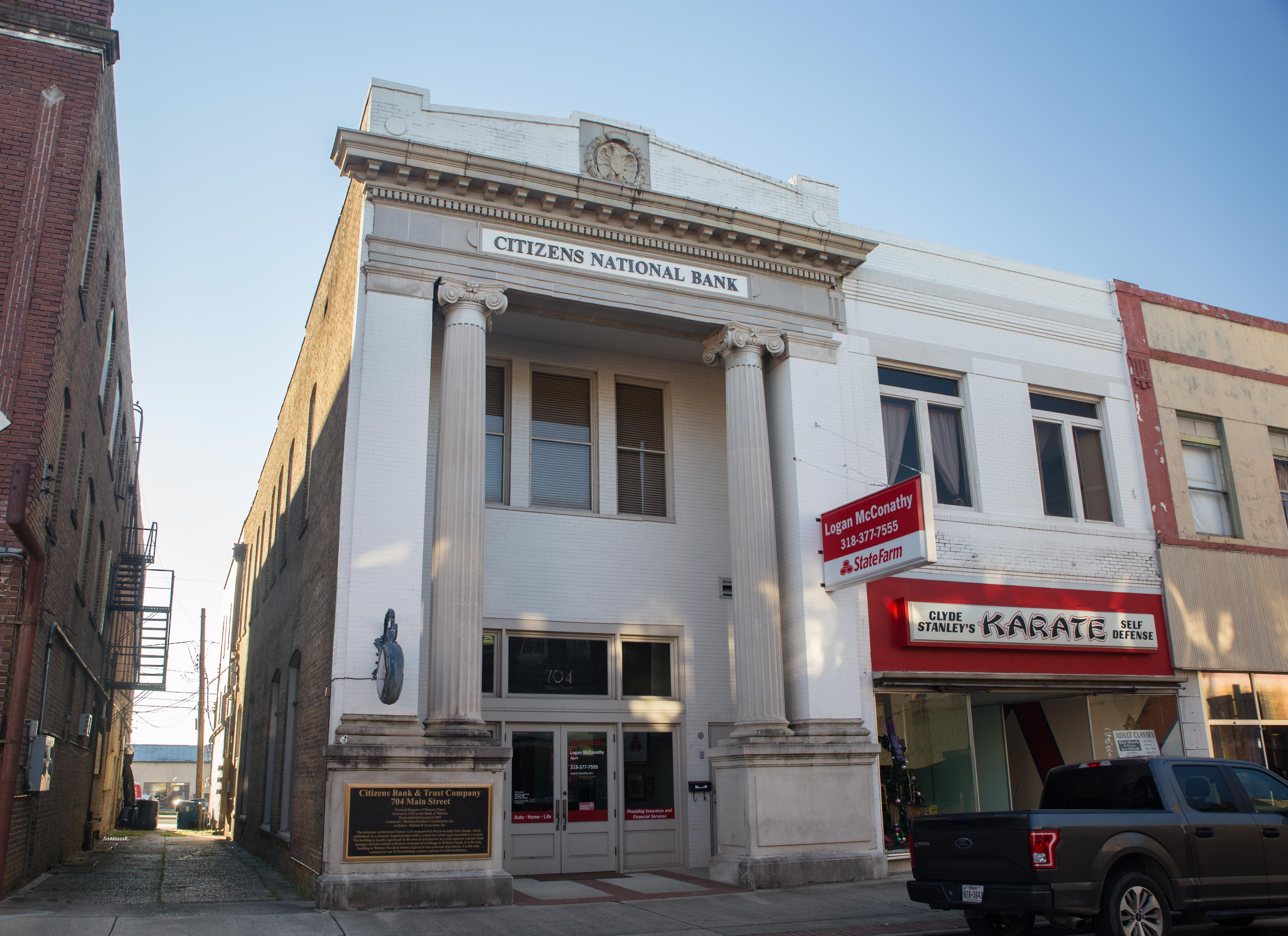
- Bank of Webster in Minden, Louisiana

- Location within Louisiana Location within the United States
- Location: 704 Main St., Minden, Louisiana
- Coordinates: 32°36′57″N 93°17′10″W
- Area: 0.1 acres (0.040 ha)
- Built: 1910
- Architectural style: Classical Revival
- NRHP reference No.: 87001468
- Added to NRHP: September 16, 1987

The Bank of Webster, located at 704 Main St. in Minden, Louisiana, was built in 1910. It was listed on the National Register of Historic Places in 1987.

It was deemed notable as "a very superior example from among a limited number of historic commercial buildings in Webster Parish." It is a two-story brick Classical Revival structure.
