= Ethridge =

Ethridge may refer to:

- Ethridge, Kentucky
- Ethridge, Montana
- Ethridge, Tennessee

== People with the name Ethridge ==
- Benjamin Kane Ethridge (born 1977), American author
- Chris Ethridge (1947–2012), American country rock bass guitarist
- Eric Ethridge (born 1989), Canadian country pop singer
- George H. Ethridge (1871–1957), justice of the Supreme Court of Mississippi
- Joe Ethridge (1928–2007), American professional football player
- Kamie Ethridge (born 1964), American basketball player and coach
- Mark Ethridge (born 1949), American novelist, screenwriter, and communications consultant
- Ray Ethridge (born 1968), American football wide receiver
- Robbie Ethridge (born 1955), American anthropologist and author
- Roe Ethridge (born 1969), American postmodernist commercial and art photographer
- William N. Ethridge (1912–1971), chief justice of the Supreme Court of Mississippi

== See also ==
- Ethridge House (disambiguation)
- Etheridge (disambiguation)
- Ettridge (disambiguation)
