= McNeely House =

Historic house in Louisiana, United States

- U.S. National Register of Historic Places
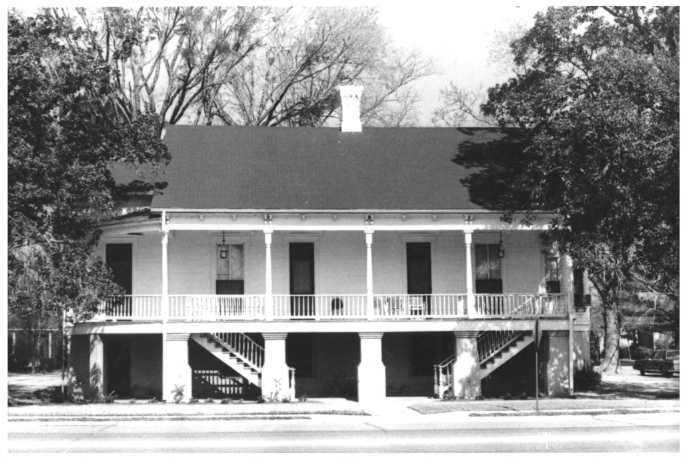

- Location within Louisiana Location within the United States
- Location: 305 Main Street, Colfax, Louisiana
- Coordinates: 31°31′02″N 92°42′43″W
- Area: 0.2 acres (0.081 ha)
- Built: 1883
- Architectural style: Creole
- NRHP reference No.: 83000506
- Added to NRHP: March 31, 1983

The McNeely House is a historic house located at 305 Main Street in Colfax in Grant Parish, Louisiana.

It was built in 1883 as a two-story brick and frame large Creole-style cottage, and was expanded with small side wings in 1893. It has a second story gallery with square posts whose upper two-thirds are turned into Doric columns.

The house was listed on the National Register of Historic Places on March 31, 1983.

== See also ==
- National Register of Historic Places listings in Grant Parish, Louisiana
