= Kateland =

Historic house in Louisiana, United States

- U.S. National Register of Historic Places
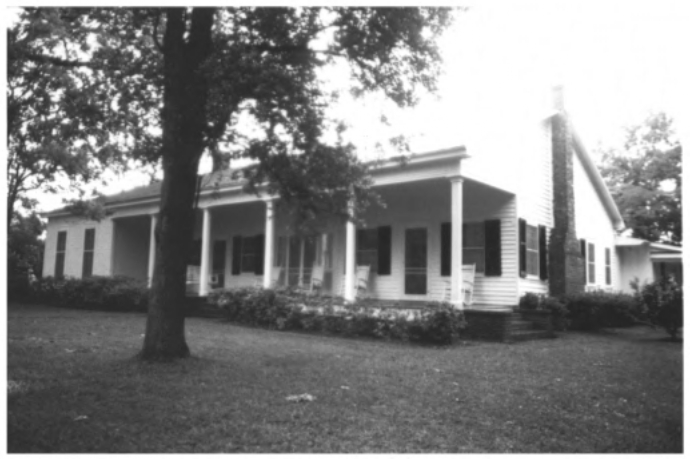

- Location within Louisiana Location within the United States
- Location: Along River Road, about 0.9 miles (1.4 km) west of LA 8 and about 4.6 miles (7.4 km) north of Boyce
- Nearest city: Boyce, Louisiana
- Coordinates: 31°27′06″N 92°41′31″W
- Area: 0.5 acres (0.20 ha)
- Built: c.1830
- NRHP reference No.: 84001288
- Added to NRHP: April 12, 1984

Kateland is a historic house in unincorporated Grant Parish, Louisiana located about 4.6 miles (7.4 km) miles north of the town of Boyce in neighborhing Rapides Parish.

Built in 1830, it is a rambling house started as an open dogtrot. It is the only known surviving antebellum structure in Grant Parish.

In the 1880s, the dogtrot corridor was enclosed and the house was extended. A rear extension with a side gallery was built in about 1900, and that gallery was enclosed in the 1920s, when the front gallery's columns were also replaced.

The house was listed on the National Register of Historic Places on April 12, 1984.

== See also ==
- National Register of Historic Places listings in Grant Parish, Louisiana
