= Coushatta massacre =

Nineteenth-century American massacre

- Part of the Reconstruction Era
- Location: Coushatta, Louisiana
- Date: August 1874
- Target: Republicans and African Americans
- Deaths: 6 Republicans and 5 to 20 freedmen
- Perpetrator: White League
- Motive: Enforce white supremacy

The Coushatta massacre was an attack in August 1874 by members of the White League—a white supremacist paramilitary organization composed of white Southern Democrats—on Republican officeholders and freedmen in Coushatta, Louisiana. They assassinated six white Republicans and five to 20 freedmen who were witnesses.

The White League had organized to restore white supremacy by driving Republicans out of Louisiana, disrupting their political organizing, and intimidating or murdering freedmen. Like the Red Shirts and other "White Line" organizations, they were described as "the military arm of the Democratic Party."

== Background ==
In the period after the American Civil War, Marshall H. Twitchell, a Union veteran from Vermont who had led United States Colored Troops, passed an administrative examination and moved to Red River Parish, Louisiana, to become an agent for the Freedmen's Bureau. He married Adele Coleman, a young local woman. Her family taught him about cotton farming. In 1870, Twitchell was elected as a Republican to the Louisiana State Senate. He appointed his brother and three brothers-in-law (the latter natives of the parish) to local positions, including sheriff, tax assessor and clerk of court. Twitchell worked to promote education and to extend public representation and civil rights to the former slaves, known as freedmen.

The White League arose in the Red River valley in 1874, first in Grant Parish and nearby parishes. It was a group of Confederate veterans whose stated purpose was "the extermination of the carpetbag element" and restoration of white supremacy. Most had been with the white militias that had taken part in the Colfax Massacre, but units later arose in other communities across the state. Unlike the secret Ku Klux Klan, the White League operated openly and were more organized. They intended to overturn Republican rule. They targeted local Republican officeholders for assassination, disrupted political organizing, and terrorized freedmen and their allies. One historian describes them as "the military arm of the Democratic Party."

In Coushatta, the White League criticized Republican leadership. Members publicly accused Twitchell and his brothers-in-law of inciting what they termed "a black rebellion."

== The attack ==
On the night of August 25, 1874, Thomas Floyd, an African-American farmer, was murdered in Brownsville. Members of the White League subsequently arrested several White Republicans and 20 freedmen, accusing them of plotting a "negro rebellion". Among the White Republicans were Sheriff Edgerton, William Howell (the parish attorney), Robert Dewees (De Soto Parish tax collector), Homer Twitchell (a tax collector and Marshall Twitchell's brother), and three brothers-in-law, Monroe Willis, and Clark Holland; Marshall Twitchell was in New Orleans at a Republican state convention. Within two days, hundreds of armed Whites arrived in Coushatta.

After holding their hostages several days, the captors forced the officeholders to sign a statement saying they would immediately leave Louisiana. While travelling out of the region, six white captives were murdered by a band of armed whites led by Dick Coleman. Elsewhere in Coushatta and nearby, Whites attacked numerous African Americans, resulting in at least four deaths. Levin Allen had his arms and legs broken before being burned alive. Louis Johnson and Paul Williams, two of the freedmen arrested by the White League, were hanged by Coleman and his mob. Although 25 men were arrested for the massacre, because of lack of evidence none was brought to trial.

== Aftermath ==
Violence continued throughout the state. The Coushatta massacre was followed shortly by a large White League insurrection in New Orleans, where they hoped to install Democrat John McEnery as governor. He had been a contender in the disputed state election of 1872, in which both parties claimed victory. In the New Orleans "Battle of Liberty Place", 5,000 White League members overwhelmed 3,500 troops of the metropolitan police and state militia. After demanding the resignation of Republican Governor William Pitt Kellogg, the White League took control of Canal Street, city hall, statehouse and arsenal.

This armed rebellion finally forced President Ulysses S. Grant to respond to the governor's request for reinforcements to Louisiana. Then, within three days, Kellogg was back in office with the arrival of Federal troops. The White League disappeared before they came. More troops arrived within a month to try to tame the Red River valley. Grant's decision to send troops was too late to prevent further consolidation of Democratic power. In the 1876 election, white Redeemer Democrats gained a majority in the state legislature.

Two years later, when Twitchell returned briefly to Red River Parish, he was shot six times (two in each arm and one in each of his legs), perhaps by a local rival, James G. Marston or by Coleman. His remaining brother-in-law George King died in the attack. Although Twitchell survived, his injuries cost him the loss of both his arms.

== See also ==
- List of massacres in Louisiana
- Freedmen massacres
