= Colfax Jail =

Historic building in Colfax, Louisiana, US

- U.S. National Register of Historic Places
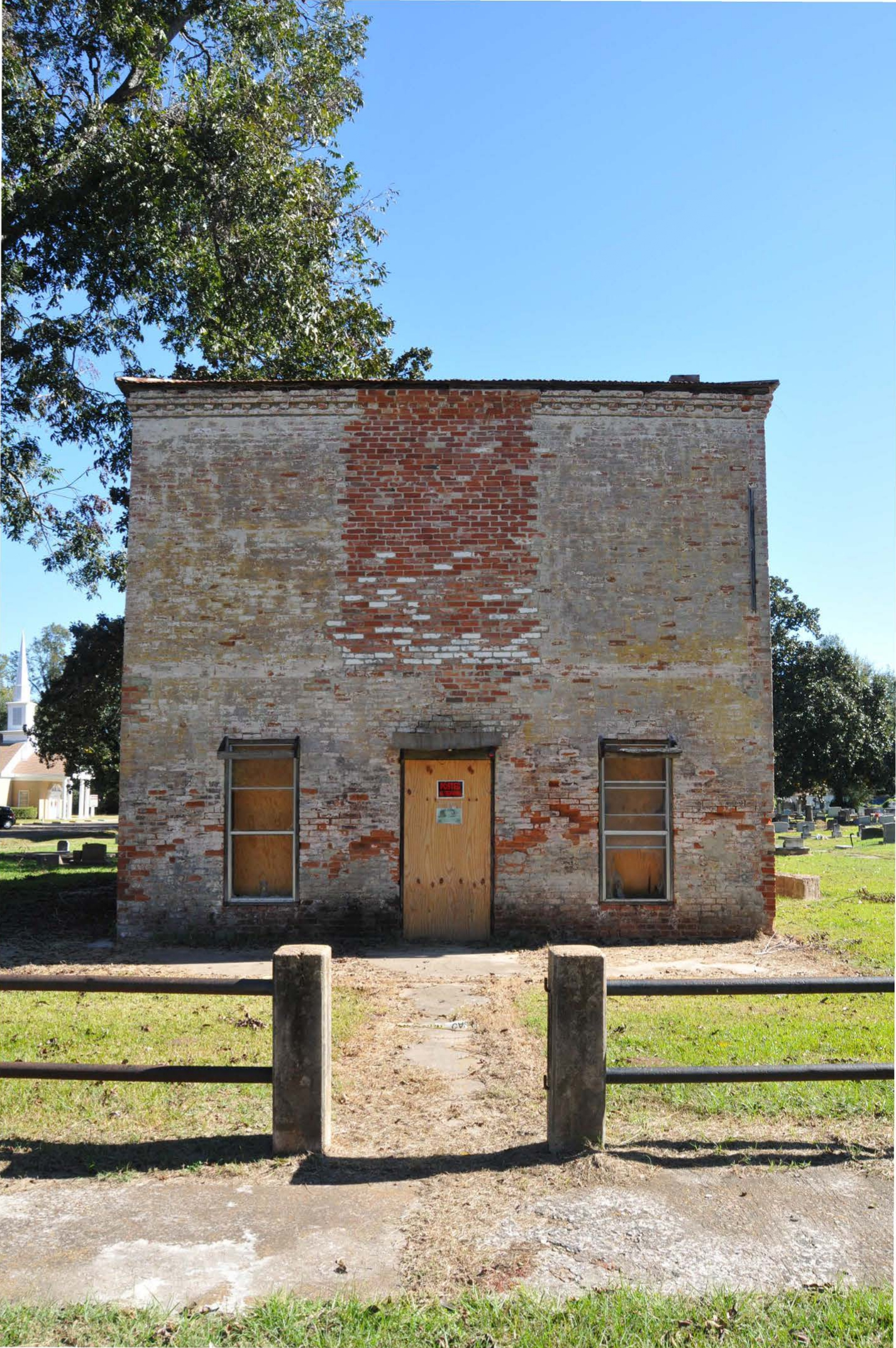

- Location within Louisiana Location within the United States
- Location: 485 Richardson Dr Colfax, Louisiana
- Coordinates: 31°31′11″N 92°41′56″E
- Area: 1,536 square feet
- Built: 1890
- Built by: J.C. Fletcher; Antoine Julian Morat
- NRHP reference No.: 100002579
- Added to NRHP: June 18, 2018

The Colfax Jail is a historic jail building located on the corner of Faircloth Street and 4th Street in Colfax, Louisiana near the Colfax City Cemetery.

Built by J.C. Fletcher and Antoine Julian Morat in 1890 and 1894, the structure is a two-story masonry building. It was used as a jail, bull stable, American Legion post, U.S. Army Corps of Engineers housing, Tri-State Demonstration Library Headquarters, and local Council on Aging.

The jail building was listed on the National Register of Historic Places on June 18, 2018.

== See also ==
- National Register of Historic Places listings in Grant Parish, Louisiana
