= Hotel Lesage =

Historic hotel building in Colfax, Louisiana, US

- U.S. National Register of Historic Places
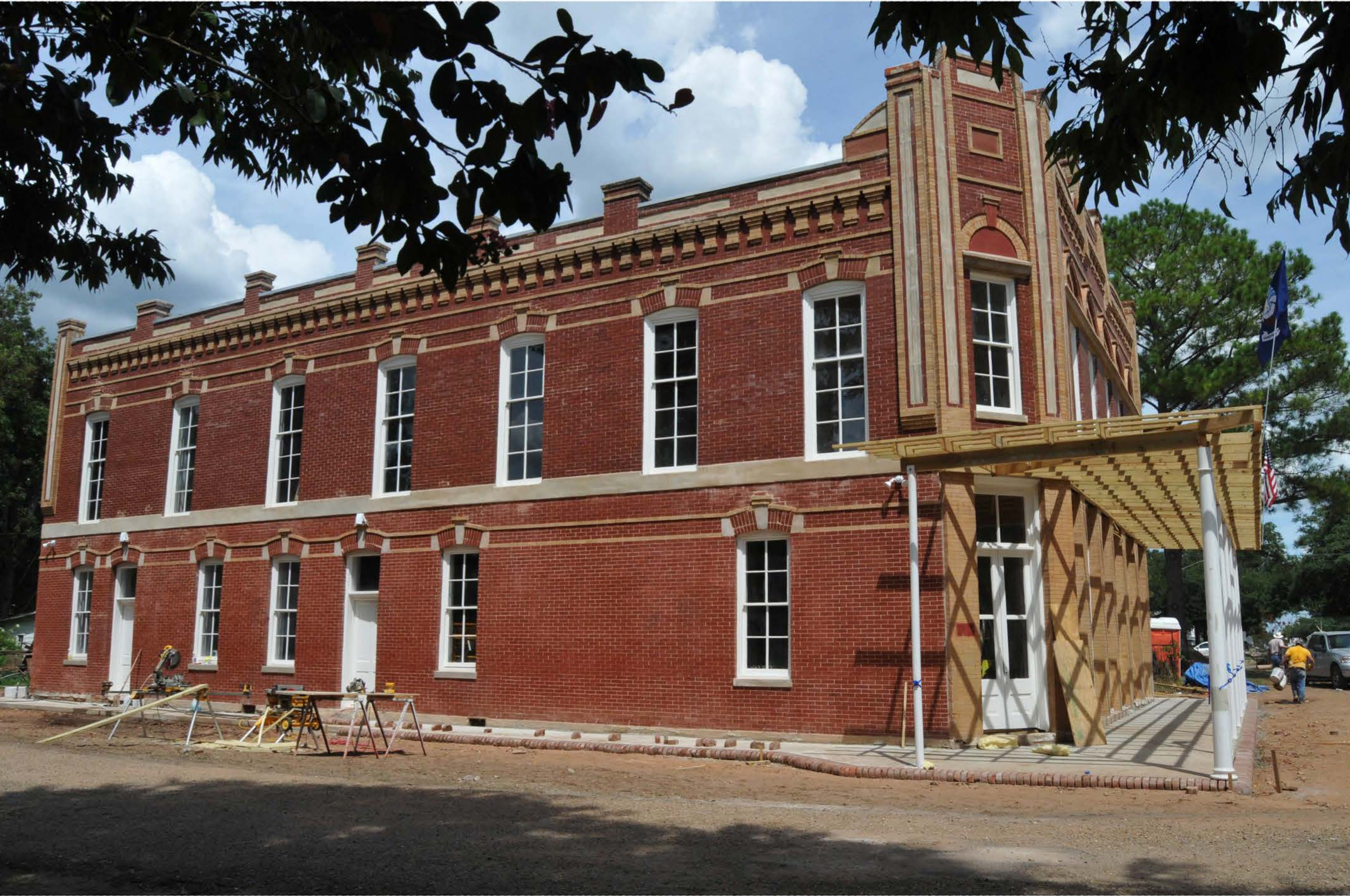

- Location within Louisiana Location within the United States
- Location: 101 Main Street, Colfax, Louisiana
- Coordinates: 31°31′00″N 92°42′49″W
- Area: less than an acre
- Built: 1902
- Built by: John W. Runshaug
- Architectural style: Commercial Style
- NRHP reference No.: 15000999
- Added to NRHP: January 26, 2016

The Hotel Lesage is a historic former hotel building located at 101 Main Street in Colfax, Louisiana, United States. The two-story masonry building stands near the corner of First and Main streets, facing west toward the Red River and the former steamboat landing.

== History and architecture ==
Joseph Victor Lesage had the building constructed in tha 1902, with John W. Runshaug recorded as builder in the National Register of Historic Places documentation. During its period of significance, from 1902 to 1965, it functioned as a hotel, restaurant, and commercial space, including a separate store. The National Park Service identified the property with the areas of significance of commerce and social history, and described it as Colfax's principal and only hotel during that period.

At the time of its 2015 nomination, the building retained a number of historic interior features, including beadboard walls and ceilings, the main staircase, several fireplaces and mantels, wood floors, transoms, and much of the second-floor hotel-room plan. The property also included a small rear shed, built after 1936, which was counted as a contributing building. Although portions of the first floor had been altered, the nomination found that the property retained its historic character.

== See also ==
- National Register of Historic Places listings in Grant Parish, Louisiana
