= Ettridge =

Ettridge may refer to:

- Ben Ettridge, an Australian wheelchair basketball coach
- Christopher Ettridge, an English actor
- David Ettridge, an Australian politician
- The Ettridge Collection, a collection of literature about domestic appliance donated by the namesake's estate to the British Library

== See also ==
- Royal Bank of Scotland plc v Etridge (No 2), a leading English case on when undue influence can vitiate contracts
- Ethridge (disambiguation)
- Etheridge (disambiguation)
