= Rock Hill, Louisiana =

- Census-designated place
- Location within Louisiana Location within the United States
- Coordinates: 31°26′34″N 92°34′10″W
- Country: United States
- State: Louisiana
- Parish: Grant

Area
  - Total: 3.86 sq mi (9.99 km^{2})
  - Land: 3.85 sq mi (9.98 km^{2})
  - Water: 0.0039 sq mi (0.01 km^{2})
- Elevation: 98 ft (30 m)

Population (2020)
  - Total: 260
  - Density: 67.5/sq mi (26.05/km^{2})
- Time zone: UTC-6 (CST)
  - Summer (DST): UTC-5 (CDT)
- ZIP Code: 71423
- FIPS code: 22-65535
- GNIS feature ID: 2586707

Rock Hill is an unincorporated community and census-designated place (CDP) in Grant Parish, Louisiana, United States. As of the 2020 census, Rock Hill had a population of 260.

Rock Hill is located in southwestern Grant Parish along U.S. Route 71, which leads northwest 10 miles (16 km) to Colfax, the parish seat, and southeast 17 miles (27 km) to Alexandria. According to the U.S. Census Bureau, the Rock Hill CDP has a total area of 3.9 square miles (10.0 km^{2}), of which 0.004 square miles (0.01 km^{2}), or 0.06%, is water.

== Demographics ==
Historical population
Census	Pop.	Note	%±
2010	274		—
2020	260		−5.1%
U.S. Decennial Census

Rock Hill was first listed as a census designated place in the 2010 U.S. census.
