= National Register of Historic Places listings in Grant Parish, Louisiana =

Location of Grant Parish in Louisiana

This is a list of the National Register of Historic Places listings in Grant Parish, Louisiana.

This is intended to be a complete list of the properties on the National Register of Historic Places in Grant Parish, Louisiana, United States. The locations of National Register properties for which the latitude and longitude coordinates are included below, may be seen in a map.

There are 8 properties listed on the National Register in the parish.

This National Park Service list is complete through NPS recent listings posted March 20, 2026.

== Current listings ==
	Name on the Register	Image	Date listed	Location	City or town	Description
1	Colfax Jail	Colfax Jail	June 18, 2018 (#100002579)	Corner of Faircloth Street and 4th Street; 31°31′09″N 92°42′45″W	Colfax	
2	Ethridge House	Ethridge House	August 7, 1989 (#89001043)	401 Louise Street; 31°31′16″N 92°42′50″W	Colfax	
3	Fish Creek Site		August 7, 2017 (#100001431)	Address restricted	Pollock vicinity	A 45 acres (18 ha) area comprising two archeological sites (16GR17 and 16GR477).
4	Hotel Lesage	Hotel Lesage	January 26, 2016 (#15000999)	101 Main Street; 31°31′00″N 92°42′49″W	Colfax	
5	Kateland	Kateland	April 12, 1984 (#84001288)	Along River Road, about 0.9 miles (1.4 km) west of LA 8 and about 4.6 miles (7.4 km) north of Boyce; 31°27′06″N 92°41′31″W	Boyce vicinity	
6	McNeely House	McNeely House	March 31, 1983 (#83000506)	305 Main Street; 31°31′02″N 92°42′43″W	Colfax	
7	Earl Roberts House	Earl Roberts House	April 20, 1989 (#89000328)	253 2nd Street; 31°30′51″N 92°42′43″W	Colfax	Also known as Kennedy House
8	Sparrow Lane Bridge	Sparrow Lane Bridge	January 31, 2017 (#100000597)	Over Bayou Rigolette, about 0.3 miles (0.48 km) south of LA 492 and about 6.7 miles (10.8 km) southeast of Colfax; 31°27′59″N 92°36′41″W	Colfax vicinity	Concrete deck girder bridge built in 1919 and never altered since its construction.

== See also ==
- List of National Historic Landmarks in Louisiana
- National Register of Historic Places listings in Louisiana
