= Ethridge House =

Ethridge House may refer to:

- Ethridge House (Hope, Arkansas), listed on the National Register of Historic Places in Hempstead County, Arkansas
- Ethridge House (Colfax, Louisiana), listed on the National Register of Historic Places in Grant County, Louisiana
