= Ethridge House (Colfax, Louisiana) =

Historic house in Louisiana, United States

- U.S. National Register of Historic Places
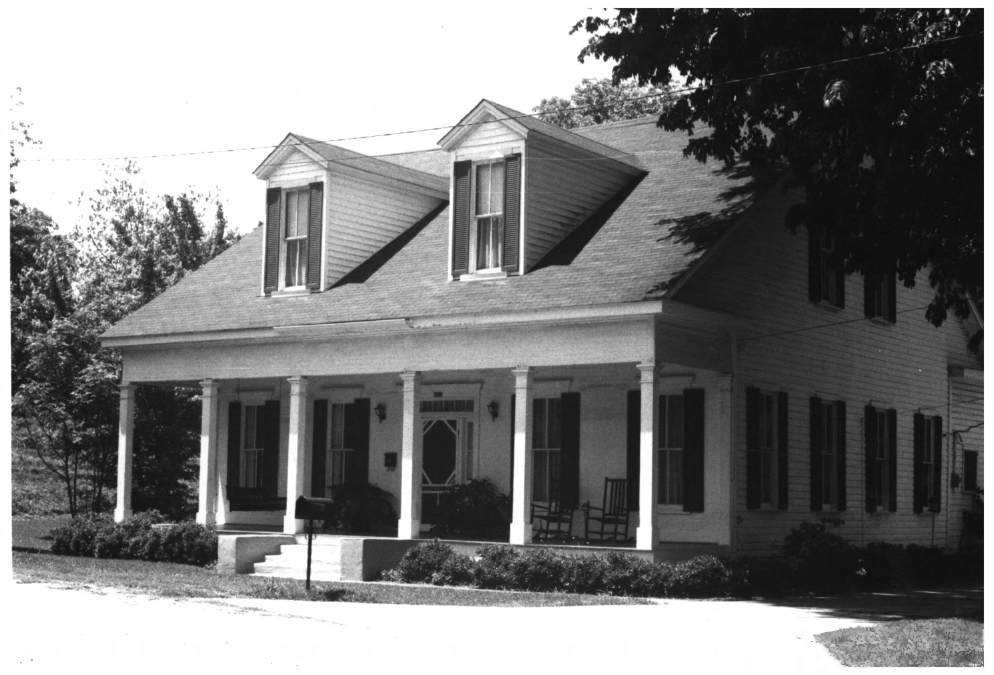

- Location within Louisiana Location within the United States
- Location: 401 Louise Street, Colfax, Louisiana
- Coordinates: 31°31′16″N 92°42′50″W
- Area: less than one acre
- Built: 1900
- Architectural style: Greek Revival
- NRHP reference No.: 89001043
- Added to NRHP: August 7, 1989

The Ethridge House is a historic house located at 401 Louise Street in Colfax, Louisiana, in an old neighborhood by the Red River levee.

Built in 1900 by T.Q. Long and sold to Emuel Allen Ethridge in 1907, the house it is a "retardataire" Greek Revival residence, backward-looking in its architectural style for its age. It is a 1 1/2-story frame cottage.

The house was listed on the National Register of Historic Places on August 7, 1989.

== See also ==
- National Register of Historic Places listings in Grant Parish, Louisiana
