= Earl Roberts House =

- U.S. National Register of Historic Places
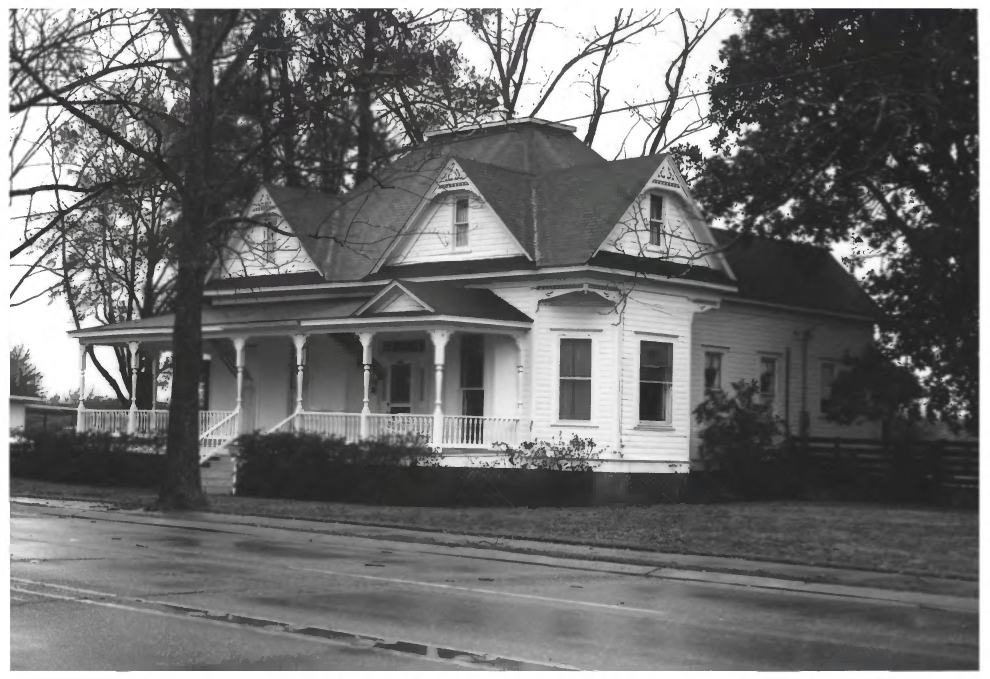

- Location within Louisiana
- Location: 253 Second St., Colfax, Louisiana
- Coordinates: 31°30′51″N 92°42′43″W
- Area: 0.5 acres (0.20 ha)
- Built: 1907
- Built by: Ferrier, Marceland
- Architectural style: Queen Anne Revival
- NRHP reference No.: 89000328
- Added to NRHP: April 20, 1989

The Earl Roberts House, also known as Kennedy House, at 253 Second St. in Colfax, Louisiana, was built in 1907. It was listed on the National Register of Historic Places in 1989.

It was deemed " a superior example of the Queen Anne Revival style within the context of the parish seat of Colfax. It also features relatively elaborate Eastlake ornamentation when compared to the town's other period residences."
