= Etheridge =

Etheridge may refer to:

== People ==
- Bill Etheridge, a British politician, Member of the European Parliament for UKIP
- Bob Etheridge (born 1941), US Representative
- Chris Etheridge, British sidecarcross rider
- Emerson Etheridge, late US Representative
- George Etherege, English dramatist
- James Etheridge, English MP
- Joanne Etheridge, Australian physicist
- John Etheridge, English Jazz guitarist
- John Wesley Etheridge (1804–1866), English nonconformist minister and scholar
- Melissa Etheridge, a singer-songwriter
- Neil Etheridge, English-Filipino footballer
- Robert Etheridge (geologist) (1819–1903), English geologist and palaeontologist.
- Robert Etheridge, Junior (1847–1920), English palaeontologist who worked extensively in Australia
- Zac Etheridge: American football coach and player.

== Places ==
- Shire of Etheridge, a local government area in north Queensland, Australia

== See also ==
- Ethridge (disambiguation)
- Ettridge (disambiguation)
