= Julie Hayden (teacher) =

American teacher (c. 1857 – 1874)

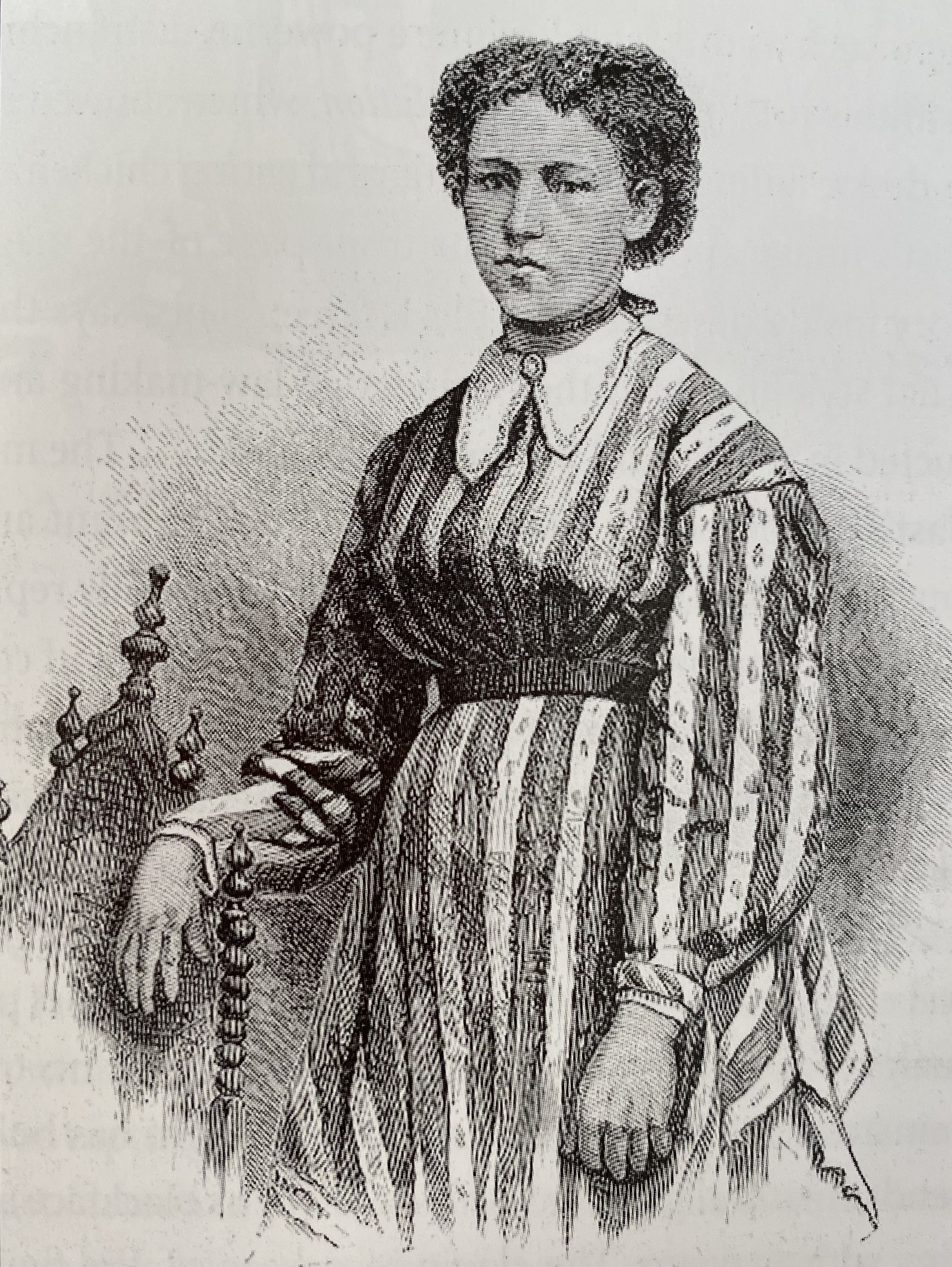
Julie Hayden

Julie Hayden (c. 1857 – August 21, 1874), sometimes Julia Hayden, was an American Black school teacher murdered by members of the White Man's League within days of starting a teaching position at a school for Black children in Tennessee.

== Early life and education ==
Hayden grew up in Spring Hill, Tennessee. She attended Central Tennessee College in Nashville, a teachers' college for Black students.

== Murder ==
Hayden moved from Nashville to Hartsville to "educate black people". At the time teaching Black people to read was "interpreted as a challenge to white control". At the time of her murder, Hayden was staying with Emery Lowe and his wife, Pink, as a boarder. Three days after her arrival in Hartsville, on August 21 at 2:00 am, the Lowe home was invaded by members of the White Man's League, who chased her through the house and shot and killed her. According to Harper's Weekly, "Her murderers escaped, nor is it likely that the death of Julia Hayden will ever be avenged, unless the nation insists upon the extermination of the White Man's League."

In August 1874, the Republican Banner reported that the Superintendent of Public Instruction, Colonel John Fleming, had requested Robert S. Smith, the Trousdale County superintendent, provide a report on the murder. In September 1874, Black citizens of Spring Hill, where Hayden's family lived, petitioned Tennessee Governor John C. Brown to find and arrest the murderers.

Charges were filed against Pat Lyons and J. Bowen Saunders. During the trial, Saunders admitted that he had killed two Black people. In October 1874 the accused were released on $3,500 bail.

According to Alan Friedlander and Richard Allen Garber, Hayden "became the poster child of southern violence".
