= Colfax massacre =

1873 murder of black men by white militia in Colfax, Louisiana

- Part of the Reconstruction era
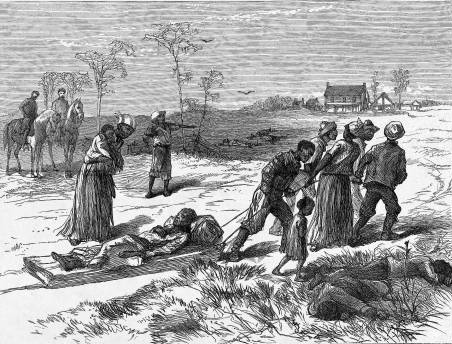
- Gathering the dead after the Colfax massacre, published in Harper's Weekly, May 10, 1873
Date	April 13, 1873
Location	Colfax, Louisiana, United States 31°31′01″N 92°42′42″W
Result	Attackers put on trial; Attackers later released

Belligerents
Courthouse attackers: White locals; Christopher Nash's white paramilitary	Courthouse occupiers: Black locals; Republican officials

Casualties and losses
3 dead	Between 62 and 153 dead
- Location within Louisiana Colfax massacre (the United States)

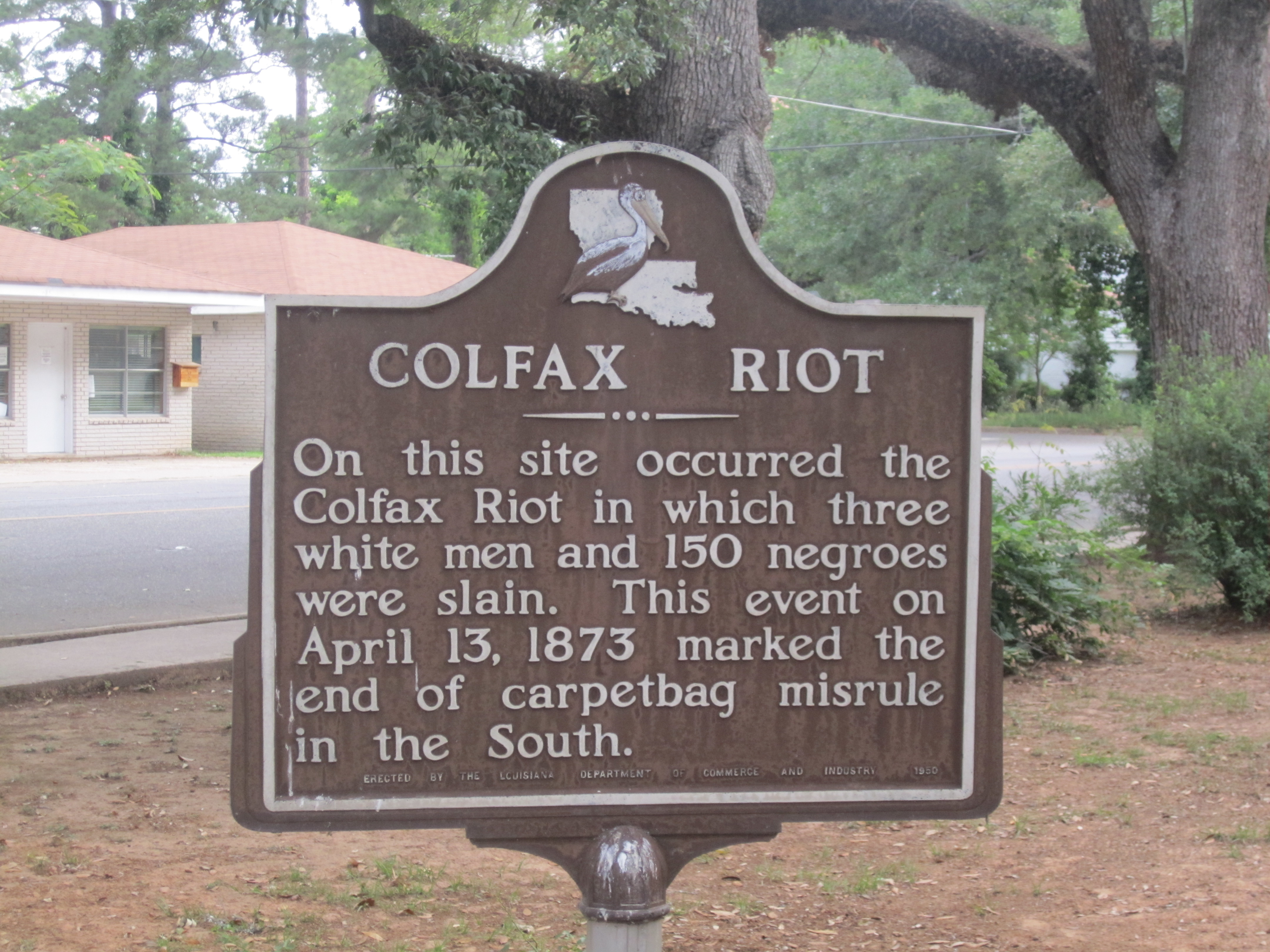
Former historical marker in Colfax. Erected in 1950, the marker was removed in May 2021 due to biased language (it uses the term "riot" and refers to the incident as "the end of carpetbag misrule in the South").

The Colfax massacre, sometimes referred to as the Colfax riot, occurred on Easter Sunday, April 13, 1873, in Colfax, Louisiana, the parish seat of Grant Parish. Between 62 and 153 black men were murdered while surrendering to a mob of former Confederate soldiers and members of the Ku Klux Klan.

After the contested 1872 election for governor of Louisiana and local offices, a group of White men armed with rifles and a small cannon overpowered Black freedmen and state militia occupying the Grant Parish courthouse in Colfax. Most of the freedmen were killed after surrendering, and nearly another 50 were killed later that night after being held as prisoners for several hours. Three Whites died, but the number of Black victims was difficult to determine because many bodies were thrown into the Red River or removed for burial, possibly at mass graves.

Historian Eric Foner describes the massacre as the worst instance of racial violence during Reconstruction. In Louisiana, it had the most fatalities of any of the numerous violent events occurring after the disputed gubernatorial contest in 1872 between Republicans and Democrats. Foner writes "...every election [in Louisiana] between 1868 and 1876 was marked by rampant violence and pervasive fraud". Although the Fusionist-dominated state "returning board," which ruled on vote validity, initially declared John McEnery and his Democratic slate the winners, the board eventually divided, with a faction declaring Republican William P. Kellogg the victor. A Republican federal judge in New Orleans ruled that the Republican-majority legislature be seated.

Federal prosecution and conviction of a few perpetrators at Colfax by the Enforcement Acts was appealed to the Supreme Court. In a major case, the court ruled in United States v. Cruikshank (1876) that protections of the Fourteenth Amendment did not apply to persons acting individually, but only to the actions of state governments. After this ruling, the federal government could no longer use the Enforcement Act of 1870 to prosecute actions by paramilitary groups such as the White League, which had chapters forming across Louisiana beginning in 1874. Intimidation, murders, and Black voter suppression by such paramilitary groups were instrumental to the Democratic Party regaining political control of the state legislature by the late 1870s.

During the late 20th and early 21st centuries, historians have given renewed attention to the events at Colfax and the resulting Supreme Court case.

== Background ==
In March 1865, Unionist planter James Madison Wells became governor of Louisiana. As the Democratic-dominated legislature passed Black Codes that restricted rights of freedmen, Wells began to favor allowing Black people to vote and temporarily disenfranchising ex-Confederates. To accomplish this, he scheduled a constitutional convention for July 30, 1866.

It was postponed because of the New Orleans massacre that day, in which armed Southern White Democrats attacked Black Americans who had a parade in support of the convention. Anticipating trouble, the mayor of New Orleans had asked the local military commander to police the city and protect the convention. The US Army failed to respond promptly to the mayor's request, and a group of White residents attacked numerous unarmed Black residents, resulting in 38 deaths (34 Black and four White) and more than 40 wounded, most of them Black folks.

When President Andrew Johnson blamed the massacre on Republican agitation, a popular national reaction against Johnson's policies resulted in national voters electing a majority Republican Congress in 1866. It passed the Civil Rights Act of 1866 despite Andrew Johnson's veto. Earlier, the Freedmen's Bureau and the occupation armies had prevented Southern Black Codes, which had limited the rights of freedmen and other Black people (including their choices of work and living locations), from becoming effective. On July 16, 1866, Congress extended the life of the Freedmen's Bureau, despite Johnson's veto. On March 2, 1867, they passed the Reconstruction Act, over Johnson's veto, which required that Black men be given the franchise—in Southern states but not in Northern states—and that reconstructed Southern states ratify the Fourteenth Amendment before admission to the Union.

By April 1868, a biracial coalition in Louisiana had elected a Republican-majority state legislature, but violence increased before the fall election. Almost all of the victims were Black and some White Republicans who were protecting the Black Republican freedmen. Insurgents also attacked people physically or burned their homes to discourage them from voting. President Johnson, a Democrat, prevented the Republican governor of Louisiana from using either the state militia or US forces to suppress the insurgent groups, such as the Knights of the White Camelia.

=== Grant Parish ===
The Red River area of Winn and Rapides parishes was a combination of large plantations and subsistence farmers; before the war, African Americans had worked as slaves on the plantations. William Smith Calhoun, a major planter, had inherited a 14,000-acre (57 km^{2}) plantation in the area from his father Meredith Calhoun. A former slaveholder, he lived with a mixed-race woman as his common-law wife and had come to favor Black political equality, encouraging the political organization of the local African American-based Republican party.

On election day in November 1868, Calhoun led a group of freedmen to vote. The ballot box was originally at a store owned by John Hooe, who had threatened to whip freedmen "if they voted Republican". Calhoun arranged for the ballot box to be moved to a plantation store owned by a Republican. In addition, he oversaw the submission of 150 Black votes from freedmen on his plantation land. The Republicans received 318 votes, and the Democrats received 49. A group of Whites threw the ballot box into the Red River, and Democrats arrested Calhoun, alleging election fraud. With the original ballot box gone, Democrat Michael Ryan went on to claim a landslide victory.

The election was also marked by violence. Election commissioner Hal Frazier, a Black Republican, was murdered by Whites. After this, Calhoun drafted a bill to create Grant Parish out of parts of Winn and Rapides parishes, which passed the Republican legislature; as a major planter, Calhoun thought he would have more political influence in the new parish, which had a Black majority. Other new parishes were created by the Republican state legislature to try to develop areas of Republican political control.

=== Enforcement against the Klan ===
According to Lane, after Ulysses S. Grant became president in 1869, he "lobbied hard for the Fifteenth Amendment" (ratified February 3, 1870), which guaranteed that Black men, most of whom were newly freed slaves, would have the right to vote. However, the Ku Klux Klan continued violent attacks and killed scores of Black residents in Arkansas, South Carolina, Georgia, Mississippi and elsewhere. In response, on May 31, 1870, Congress passed an Enforcement Act which prohibited groups of people from banding together to violate citizens' constitutional rights. Soon afterwards on April 20, 1871, Congress passed the Ku Klux Klan Act, which Grant used to suspend the writ of habeas corpus and sent federal troops to South Carolina, a state with particularly egregious Klan activity.

=== State militia ===
Governor Henry Clay Warmoth struggled to maintain political balance in Louisiana. Among his appointments, he installed William Ward, a Black Union veteran, as commanding officer of Company A, 6th Infantry Regiment, Louisiana State Militia, a new unit to be based in Grant Parish to help control the violence there and in other Red River parishes. Ward, born a slave in 1840 in Charleston, South Carolina, had learned to read and write as a valet to a master in Richmond, Virginia. In 1864 he escaped and went to Fortress Monroe, where he joined the Union Army and served until after General Robert E. Lee's surrender. About 1870 he came to Grant Parish, where he had a friend. He quickly became active among local Black Republican Party members. After his appointment to the militia, Ward recruited other freedmen for his forces, several of whom were veterans of the war.

=== Louisiana election of 1872 ===
Warmoth defected to the Liberal Republicans (a group that opposed President Grant's Reconstruction policies) in 1872. Warmoth previously supported a constitutional amendment that allowed former Confederates, who had been denied the right to vote, to be re-enfranchised. A "Fusionist" coalition of Liberal Republicans and Democrats nominated ex-Confederate battalion commander and Democrat John McEnery to succeed him as governor. In return, Democrats and Liberal Republicans were to appoint Warmoth as a US Senator. Opposing McEnery was Republican William Pitt Kellogg, one of Louisiana's US Senators. Voting on November 4, 1872, resulted in dual governments, as a Fusionist (Liberal Republicans and Democrat)-dominated returning board declared McEnery the winner while a faction of the board proclaimed Kellogg the winner. Both administrations held inaugural ceremonies and certified their lists of local candidates.

After failing to win their case in state court, the Kellogg forces appealed to federal judge Edward Durell in New Orleans to intervene and order that Kellogg and the Stalwart Republican-majority legislature were to be seated, and for Grant to authorize US Army troops to protect Kellogg's government. This action was widely criticized across the nation by Democrats and both factions of the Republican Party because it was considered to be a violation of the rights of states to manage their own (non-federal-office) elections. Thus, investigating committees of both chambers of the federal Congress in Washington were critical of the Kellogg choice. The House majority ruled Durell's action illegal and the Senate majority concluded that the Kellogg regime was "not much better than a successful conspiracy". In 1874 a House investigating committee in Washington recommended that Durell be impeached for corruption and illegally interfering in the Louisiana 1872 state elections, but Durell resigned in order to avoid impeachment.

McEnery's faction tried to take control of the state arsenal at Jackson Square, but Kellogg had the state militia seize dozens of leaders of McEnery's faction and control New Orleans, where the state government was located. McEnery returned to try to take control with a private paramilitary group. In September 1873 his forces, more than 8,000 strong, entered the city and defeated the city/state militia of about 3,500 in New Orleans. The Democrats took control of the state house, armory and police stations, where the state government was then located, in what was known as the Battle of Jackson Square. His forces held those buildings for three days before retreating before Federal troops arrived. Warmoth was subsequently impeached by the state legislature due to a bribery scandal resulting from his actions in the 1872 election.

Warmoth appointed Democrats as parish registrars, and they ensured the voter rolls included as many Whites and as few freedmen as possible. A number of registrars changed the registration site without notifying Black residents. They also required Black voters to prove they were over 21, while knowing that former slaves did not have birth certificates. In Grant Parish, one plantation owner threatened to expel Black people from homes they rented on his land if they voted Republican. Fusionists also tampered with ballot boxes on election day. One was found with a hole in it, apparently used for stuffing the ballot box. As a result, Grant Parish Fusionists claimed a landslide victory, even though Black voters outnumbered Whites by 776 to 630.

Warmoth issued commissions to Fusionist Democrats Alphonse Cazabat and Christopher Columbus Nash, elected parish judge and sheriff, respectively. Like many White men in the South, Nash was a Confederate veteran (as an officer, he had been held for a year and a half as a prisoner of war at Johnson's Island in Ohio). Cazabat and Nash took their oaths of office in the Colfax courthouse on January 2, 1873. They dispatched the documents to Governor McEnery in New Orleans.

Kellogg issued commissions to the Republican slate for Grant Parish on January 17 and 18. By then Nash and Cazabat controlled the small, primitive courthouse. Republican Robert C. Register insisted that he, not Cazabat, was the parish judge and that Republican Daniel Wesley Shaw, not Nash, was to be the sheriff. On the night of March 25, the Republicans seized the empty courthouse and took their oaths of office. They sent their oaths to the Kellogg administration in New Orleans.

Grant Parish was one of a number of new parishes created by the Republican government in an effort to increase local control in the state. Both the land and its people were originally associated with the Calhoun family, whose plantation had covered more than the borders of the new parish. The freedmen had been slaves of the plantation. The parish also included the less-developed hill country. The total population had a narrow majority of 2,400 freedmen, who mostly voted Republican, and 2,200 Whites, who voted as Democrats. Statewide political tensions were represented in the rumors going around each community, often about White fears of attacks or outrage from Black people, which added to local tensions.

=== Colfax courthouse conflict ===
Fearful that the Democrats might try to control the local parish government, Black people started to create trenches around the courthouse and drilled to keep alert. The Republican officeholders stayed there overnight. They held the town for three weeks.

On March 28, Nash, Cazabat, Hadnot, and other White Fusionists called for armed Whites to retake the courthouse on April 1. Whites were recruited from nearby Winn and surrounding parishes to join their effort. The Republicans Shaw, Register, and Flowers and others began to recruit armed Black men to defend the courthouse.

Black Republicans Lewis Meekins and state militia captain William Ward, a Black Union veteran, raided the homes of the opposition leaders: Judge William R. Rutland, Bill Cruikshank, and Jim Hadnot. Gunfire erupted between White and Black militias on April 2 and again on April 5, but the shotguns were too inaccurate to do any harm. The two sides arranged for peace negotiations. Peace ended when a White man shot and killed a Black bystander named Jesse McKinney. Another armed conflict on April 6 ended with the White militia fleeing from armed Black militia. With the threat of violence in the community, Black women and children joined the men at the courthouse for protection.

Ward had been elected state representative from the parish on the Republican ticket. He wrote to Kellogg seeking US troops for reinforcement and gave the letter to Calhoun for delivery. Calhoun took the steamboat LaBelle down the Red River but was captured by Hooe, Hadnot, and Cruikshank. They ordered Calhoun to tell the Black community members to leave the courthouse.

The Black defenders refused to leave although threatened by parties of armed Whites commanded by Nash. To recruit men during the rising political tensions, Nash had contributed to lurid rumors that Black men were preparing to kill all the White men and take the White women as their own. On April 8 the anti-Republican Daily Picayune newspaper of New Orleans inflamed tensions and distorted events by the following headline:

THE RIOT IN GRANT PARISH. FEARFUL ATROCITIES BY THE NEGROES. NO RESPECT SHOWN TO THE DEAD.

Such news attracted more Whites from the region to Grant Parish to join Nash; all were experienced Confederate veterans. They acquired a four-pound cannon that could fire iron slugs. As Klansman Dave Paul said, "Boys, this is a struggle for White supremacy."

On April 11 Ward took a steamboat downriver to New Orleans to seek armed help directly from Kellogg. He was not there for the following events.

== Massacre ==
Cazabat had directed Nash as sheriff to end what he called a riot. Nash gathered an armed White paramilitary group and veteran officers from Rapides, Winn and Catahoula parishes. Nash commanded more than 300 armed White men, most on horseback and armed with rifles. He moved his forces toward the courthouse around noon on Easter Sunday, April 13. Nash reportedly ordered the defenders of the courthouse to leave. When that failed, Nash gave women and children camped outside the courthouse 30 minutes to leave. After they left, the shooting began. The fighting continued for several hours with few casualties. When Nash's paramilitary maneuvered the cannon behind the building, some of the defenders panicked and left the courthouse.

About 60 defenders ran into nearby woods and jumped into the river. Nash sent men on horseback after the fleeing Black Republicans, and his group killed most of them on the spot. Soon Nash's forces directed a Black captive to set the courthouse roof afire. The defenders displayed white flags for surrender: one made from a shirt, the other from a page of a book. The shooting stopped.

Nash's group approached and called for those surrendering to throw down their weapons and come outside. What happened next is disputed. According to the reports of some Whites, James Hadnot was shot and wounded by someone from the courthouse. "In the Negro version, the men in the courthouse were stacking their guns when the White men approached, and Hadnot was shot from behind by an overexcited member of his own force." Hadnot died later, after being taken downstream by a passing steamboat.

In the aftermath of Hadnot's shooting, Nash's men reacted with mass murders of the Black men. As more than 40 times as many Black people died as did White people, historians generally describe the event as a massacre. They killed unarmed men trying to hide in the courthouse. They rode down and killed those attempting to flee. They dumped some bodies into the Red River. About 50 Blacks survived the afternoon and were taken prisoner. Later that night they were summarily killed by their captors, who had been drinking alcohol. Only one Black man from the group, Levi Nelson, survived. He was shot by Cruikshank but managed to crawl away unnoticed. He later served as one of the federal government's chief witnesses against those who were indicted for the attacks.

Kellogg sent state militia colonels Theodore DeKlyne and William Wright to Colfax with warrants to arrest 50 White men and to install a new, compromise slate of parish officers. DeKlyne and Wright found the smoking ruins of the courthouse and many bodies of men who had been shot in the back of the head or the neck. They described that one body was charred, another man's head beaten beyond recognition, and another had a slashed throat. Surviving Blacks told DeKlyne and Wright that Blacks dug a trench around the courthouse to protect it from what they saw as an attempt by White Democrats to steal an election. They were attacked by Whites armed with rifles, revolvers and a small cannon. When Blacks refused to leave, the courthouse was burned, and the Black defenders were shot down. While the Whites accused Blacks of violating a flag of truce and rioting, Black Republicans said that none of this was true. They accused Whites of marching captured prisoners away in pairs and shooting them in the back of the head.

On April 14, some of Kellogg's police force arrived from New Orleans. Several days later, two companies of federal troops arrived. They searched for White paramilitary members, but many had already fled to Texas or the hills. The officers filed a military report in which they identified by name three Whites and 105 Blacks who had died, plus noted they had recovered 15–20 unidentified Blacks from the river. They also noted the savage nature of many of the killings, suggesting an out-of-control situation.

The exact number of dead was never established: two US Marshals, who visited the site on April 15 and buried dead, reported 62 fatalities; a military report to Congress in 1875 identified 81 Black men by name who had been killed and also estimated that between 15 and 20 bodies had been thrown into the Red River, and another 18 were secretly buried, for a total of "at least 105"; a state historical marker from 1950 noted fatalities as three Whites and 150 Blacks.

Historian Eric Foner writes:

The bloodiest single instance of racial carnage in the Reconstruction era, the Colfax massacre taught many lessons, including the lengths to which some opponents of Reconstruction would go to regain their accustomed authority. Among Blacks in Louisiana, the incident was long remembered as proof that in any large confrontation, they stood at a fatal disadvantage.

"The organization against them is too strong. ..." Louisiana Black teacher and Reconstruction legislator John G. Lewis later remarked. "They attempted [armed self-defense] in Colfax. The result was that on Easter Sunday of 1873 when the sun went down that night, it went down on the corpses of two hundred and eighty negroes."

== Aftermath ==
US Attorney James Roswell Beckwith, based in New Orleans, sent a telegram about the massacre to the US Attorney General. The massacre gained headlines of national newspapers. Various government forces spent weeks trying to round up members of the White paramilitaries, and 97 men were indicted. Beckwith charged nine men and brought them to trial for violations of the Enforcement Act of 1870. It had been designed to provide federal protection for civil rights of freedmen by the Fourteenth Amendment against actions by terrorist groups such as the Ku Klux Klan.

The men were charged with one murder and with charges related to a conspiracy against the rights of freedmen. There were two succeeding trials in 1874. William Burnham Woods presided over the first trial and was sympathetic to the prosecution. Had the men been convicted, they would not have been able to appeal their decision to an appellate court according to the laws of the time. However, Beckwith was unable to secure a conviction—one man was acquitted, and a mistrial was declared in the cases of the other eight.

In the second trial, three men were found guilty of 16 charges. However, the presiding judge, Joseph Bradley of the United States Supreme Court (riding circuit), dismissed the convictions, ruling that the charges violated the state actor doctrine, failed to prove a racial rationale for the massacre, or were void for vagueness. Sua sponte, he ordered that the men be released on bail, and they promptly disappeared.

When the federal government appealed the case, it was heard by the US Supreme Court as United States v. Cruikshank (1875). The Supreme Court ruled that the Enforcement Act of 1870 (which was based on the Bill of Rights and 14th Amendment) applied only to actions committed by the state and that it did not apply to actions committed by individuals or private conspiracies. This meant that the federal government could not prosecute cases such as the Colfax killings. The court said plaintiffs who believed their rights were abridged had to seek protection from the state. Louisiana did not prosecute any of the perpetrators of the Colfax massacre; most southern states would not prosecute White men for attacks against freedmen. Thus, enforcement of criminal sanctions under the act ended.

The publicity about the Colfax massacre and subsequent Supreme Court ruling encouraged the growth of White paramilitary organizations. In May 1874, Nash formed the first chapter of the White League from his paramilitary group, and chapters were formed in other areas of Louisiana as well as the southern parts of nearby states. Unlike the Ku Klux Klan, they operated openly and often curried publicity. One historian describes them as "the military arm of the Democratic Party." Other paramilitary groups such as the Red Shirts also arose, especially in South Carolina and Mississippi, which also had Black majorities of population, and in certain counties in North Carolina.

Paramilitary groups used violence and murder to terrorize leaders among the freedmen and White Republicans, as well as to repress voting among freedmen during the 1870s. Black American citizens had little recourse. In August 1874, for instance, the White League threw out Republican officeholders in Coushatta, Red River Parish, assassinating six Whites and killing five to 15 freedmen who were witnesses in the Coushatta massacre. Four of the White men killed were related to the state representative from the area. Such violence served to intimidate voters and officeholders; it was one of the methods that White Democrats used to gain control of the state legislature in the 1876 elections and ultimately to end Reconstruction in Louisiana.

== Remembrances ==
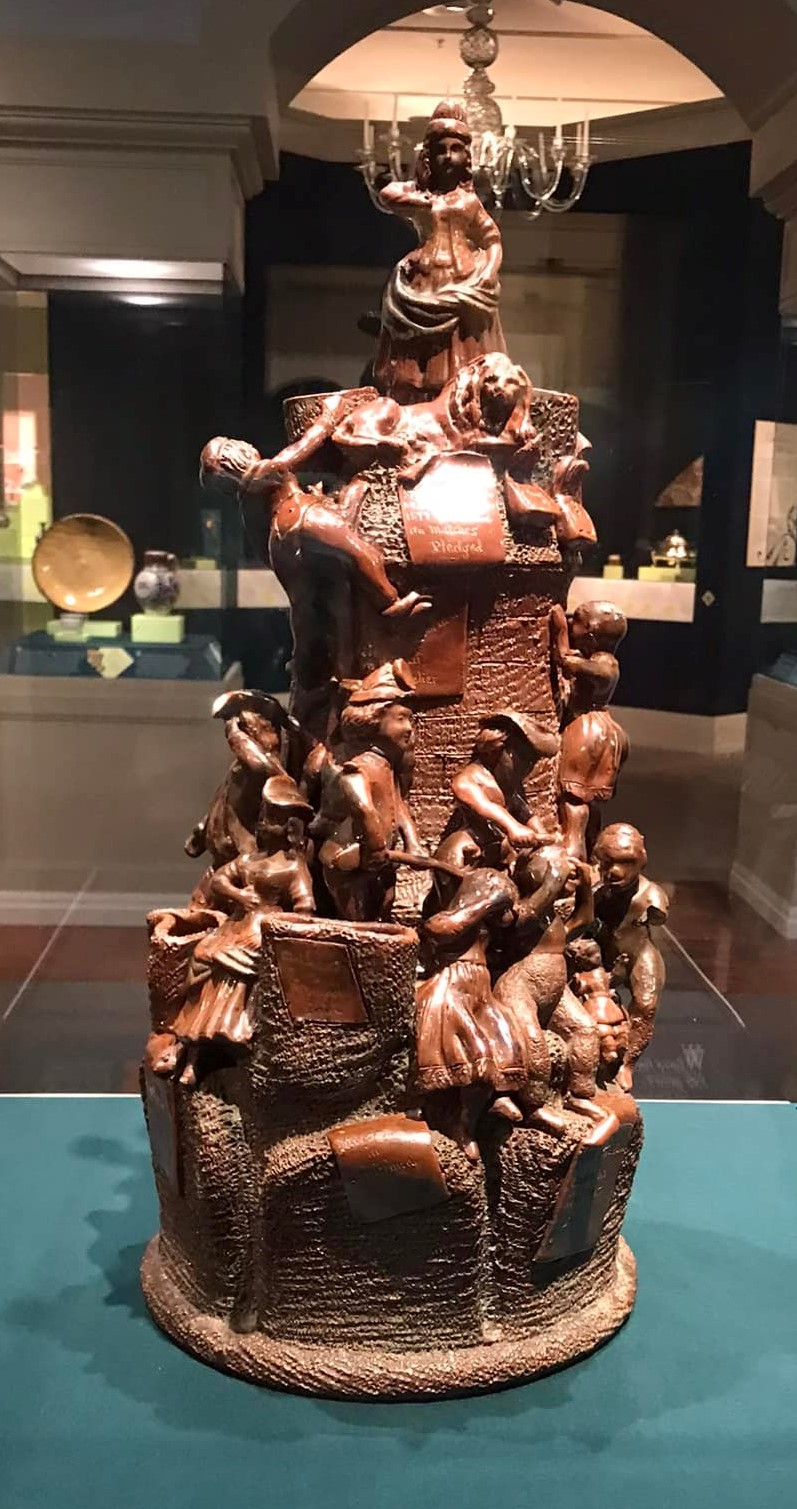
"Liberty Monument", pottery created in 1873 by White artists Wallace and Cornwall Kirkpatrick in Anna, Illinois. It depicts Lady Liberty at the top, the Colfax massacre as its main scene, and Schuyler Colfax, criticizing his involvement in the Crédit Mobilier scandal.

The scale of the massacre and the political conflict which it represents are significant in relation to the history of Reconstruction, the history of racism against African Americans and the history of racism in the United States.

In 1920, a committee met in Colfax to purchase a monument to memorialize the three White men who died. This monument stands in the Colfax Cemetery, and it reads "Erected to the memory of the Heroes, / Stephen Decatur Parish / James West Hadnot / Sidney Harris / Who fell in the Colfax Riot fighting for White Supremacy."

In 1950, Louisiana erected a state highway marker which read that the event of 1873 was "the Colfax Riot," as the event was traditionally known in the White community. The marker states, "On this site occurred the Colfax Riot, in which three white men and 150 negroes were slain. This event on April 13, 1873, marked the end of carpetbag misrule in the South." The marker was removed on May 15, 2021, for eventual placement in a museum. On April 13, 2023, the 150th anniversary of the Colfax massacre, the removed marker was replaced by a seven-foot granite monument that lists 57 Black people confirmed to have been killed in the massacre and has artwork about the experience of Black people during Reconstruction.

== Renewed attention ==
The Colfax massacre is one of the events of Reconstruction and late 19th-century American history which have received renewed national attention during the early 21st century, as much attention as the 1923 massacre in Rosewood, Florida received near the end of the 20th century. In 2007 and 2008, two books about the topic were published: Leeanna Keith's The Colfax Massacre: The Untold Story of Black Power, White Terror, and the Death of Reconstruction, and Charles Lane's The Day Freedom Died: The Colfax Massacre, the Supreme Court, and the Betrayal of Reconstruction. In his book, Lane addresses the political and legal implications of the Supreme Court case, which were derived from the prosecution of several men who were members of the White paramilitary groups.

In 2007, the Red River Heritage Association, Inc. was formed as a group which intended to construct a museum in Colfax, collect materials and store them in the museum, and interpret the history of Reconstruction in Louisiana, especially in the Red River area. In 2008, on the 135th anniversary of the Colfax massacre, an interracial group commemorated the event. It laid flowers on the place where some of the victims had fallen and it also held a forum to discuss the history of the massacre.

== See also ==
- African Americans in Louisiana
- List of incidents of civil unrest in the United States
- List of massacres in Louisiana
- Mass racial violence in the United States
