= Christopher Columbus Nash =

American businessman and politician (1838–1922)

Sheriff of Grant Parish, Louisiana
- In office 1873–unknown

Personal details
- Born: July 1, 1838 Sabine Parish, Louisiana; US
- Died: After 1922
- Party: Fusionist/Democratic Party
- Spouse: Malinda Williams Nash
- Parent(s): Valentine and Mary Anderson Nash
- Occupation: Merchant; law-enforcement officer Founding member of the White League

Christopher Columbus Nash (July 1, 1838 – June 29, 1922) was a Louisiana merchant and Democratic sheriff. In 1873, Nash led a company of white militiamen in the Colfax Massacre to take the courthouse in Colfax, from armed African-Americans. Three white men were killed; the number of African-Americans killed is estimated to have been between 60 and 150.

Nash participated in the formation of the White League, a white supremacist organization that claimed to defend a "hereditary civilization and Christianity menaced by a stupid Africanization". He was later buried in Natchitoches, Louisiana.
