= Billy Chandler (politician) =

American politician

Member of the Louisiana House of Representatives from the 22nd district
- In office 2006–2012
- Preceded by: Thomas D. Wright
- Succeeded by: Terry Brown

Personal details
- Born: Billy Ray Chandler; 1937 (age 88–89)
- Party: Democratic; Republican

Billy Ray Chandler (born 1937) is an American politician. A member of the Democratic Party and the Republican Party, he served in the Louisiana House of Representatives from 2006 to 2012.
