= Ettridge Collection =

Trade literature donated in 1997

The Ettridge Collection is a collection of trade literature relating to domestic appliances which was donated to the British Library by Ian Ettridge in 1997. Ettridge worked at domestic appliance manufacturers such as Electrolux, Hotpoint, Morphy Richards, Moulinex and Swan for over 45 years before his retirement.

The collection, held in the Library's Business & IP Centre, includes:

- Company brochures.
- Design manuals.
- Product samples.
- Ettridge's own technical drawings.
