= Terry Brown (Louisiana politician) =

American politician

Member of the Louisiana House of Representatives from the 22nd district
- In office January 2012 – January 13, 2020
- Preceded by: Billy Chandler
- Succeeded by: Gabe Firment

Personal details
- Born: Terry Ralph Brown
- Party: Independent
- Education: Northwestern State University

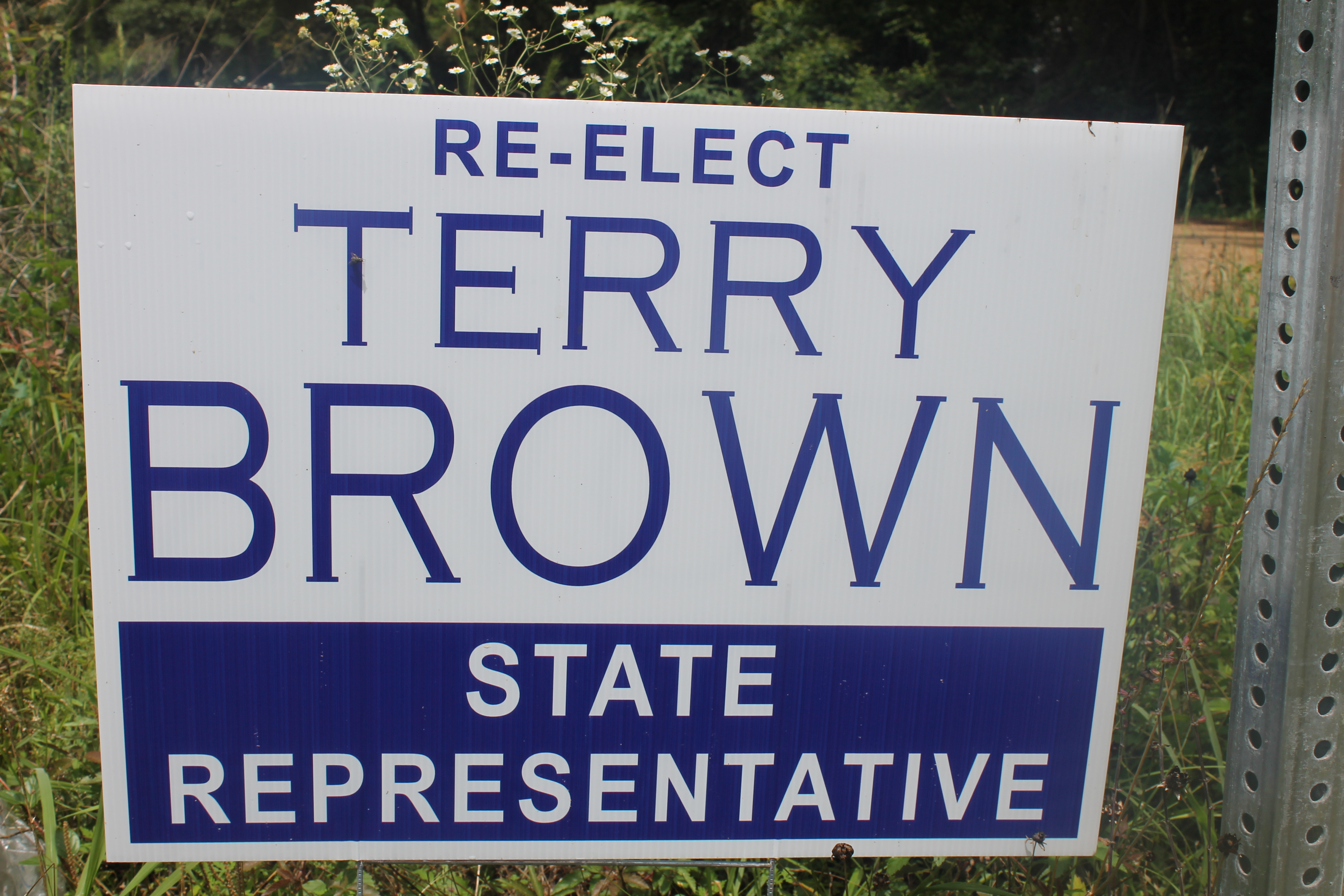
Brown's campaign sign in 2015

Terry Ralph Brown is an American politician. He served as an Independent member for the 22nd district of the Louisiana House of Representatives.

Brown was the son of June Hafer and Ralph Edison Brown. He attended Northwestern State University, where he earned his Bachelor of Arts. In 2012, Brown won the election for the 22nd district of the Louisiana House of Representatives. He succeeded Billy Chandler. Brown did not run for re-election in 2020, and was succeeded by Gabe Firment.
