= Ethridge, Kentucky =

Unincorporated community in Kentucky, United States

- Unincorporated community
- Location within the state of Kentucky Ethridge (the United States)
- Coordinates: 38°46′17″N 84°57′9″W
- Country: United States
- State: Kentucky
- County: Gallatin
- Elevation: 479 ft (146 m)
- Time zone: UTC-6 (Central (CST))
  - Summer (DST): UTC-5 (CST)
- GNIS feature ID: 491822

Ethridge is an unincorporated community located in Gallatin County, Kentucky, United States.
