= White League =

White paramilitary group from the United States

- White Man's League
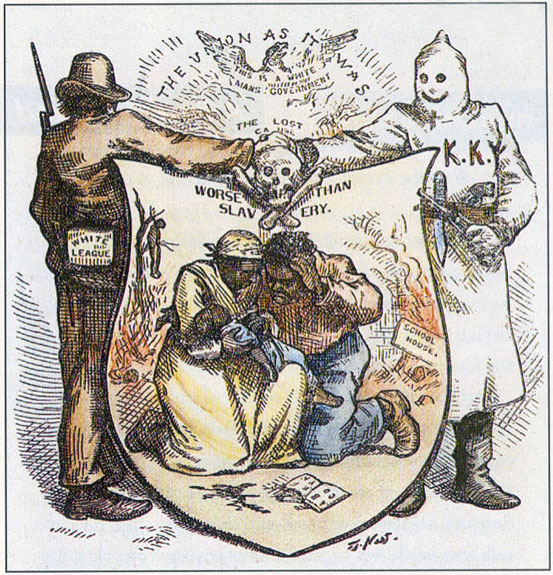
- White League and Ku Klux Klan alliance, in illustration, by Thomas Nast, in Harper's Weekly, October 24, 1874
- Dates active: 1874–1876
- Ideology: White supremacy Neo-Confederatism; Anti-Reconstruction
- Wars: Reconstruction Era violence

The White League, also known as the White Man's League, was a white supremacist paramilitary organization started in the Southern United States in 1874 to intimidate freedmen (emancipated Black former slaves) into not voting and prevent Republican Party political organizing, while also being supported by regional elements of the Democratic Party. Its first chapter was formed in Grant Parish, Louisiana, and neighboring parishes and was made up of many of the Confederate veterans who had participated in the Colfax massacre in April 1873. Chapters were founded in New Orleans and other areas of the state.

== History ==
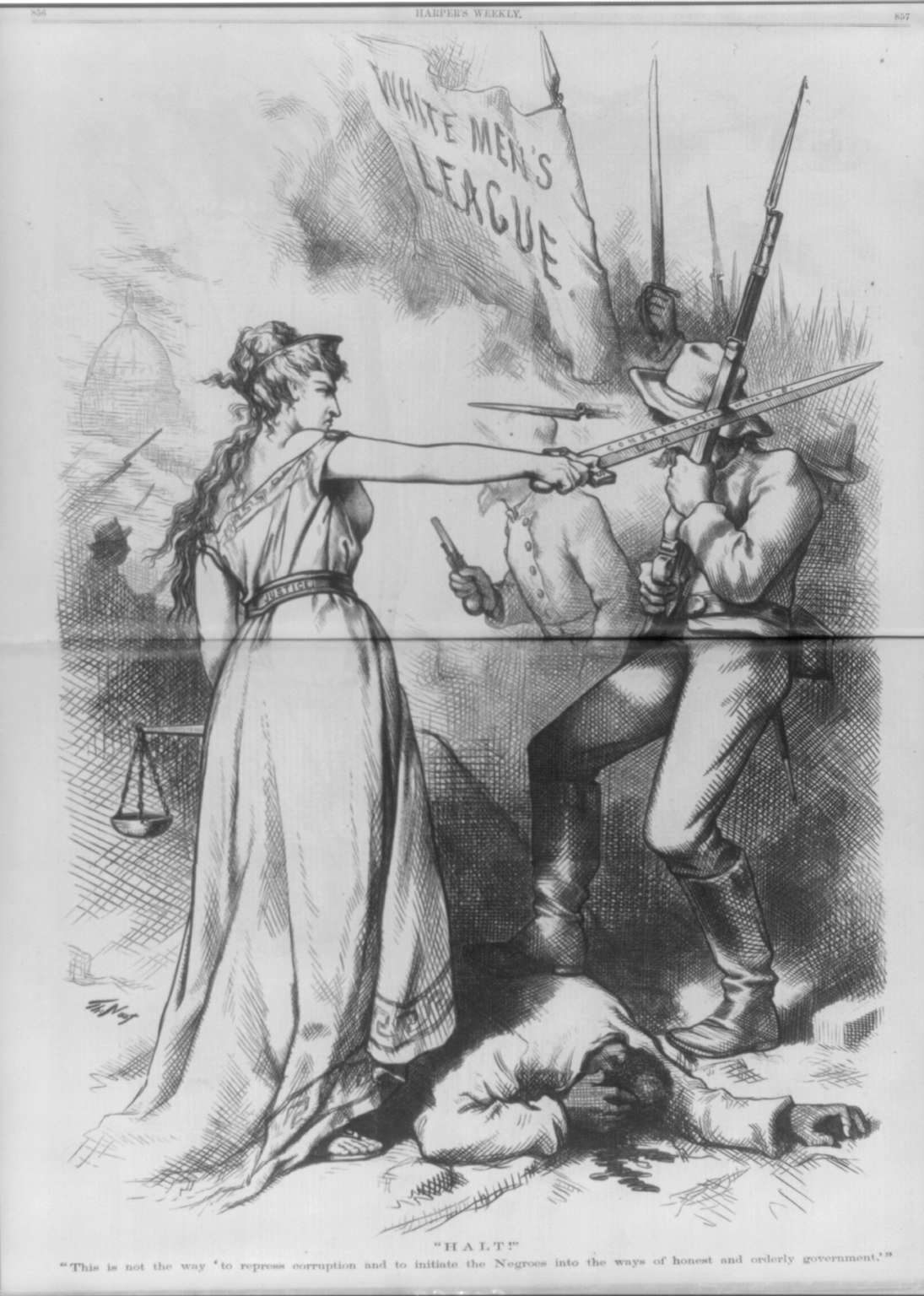
A sword-wielding Columbia in an 1874 Thomas Nast cartoon, protecting an injured black man from being beaten by a mob of White Leaguers

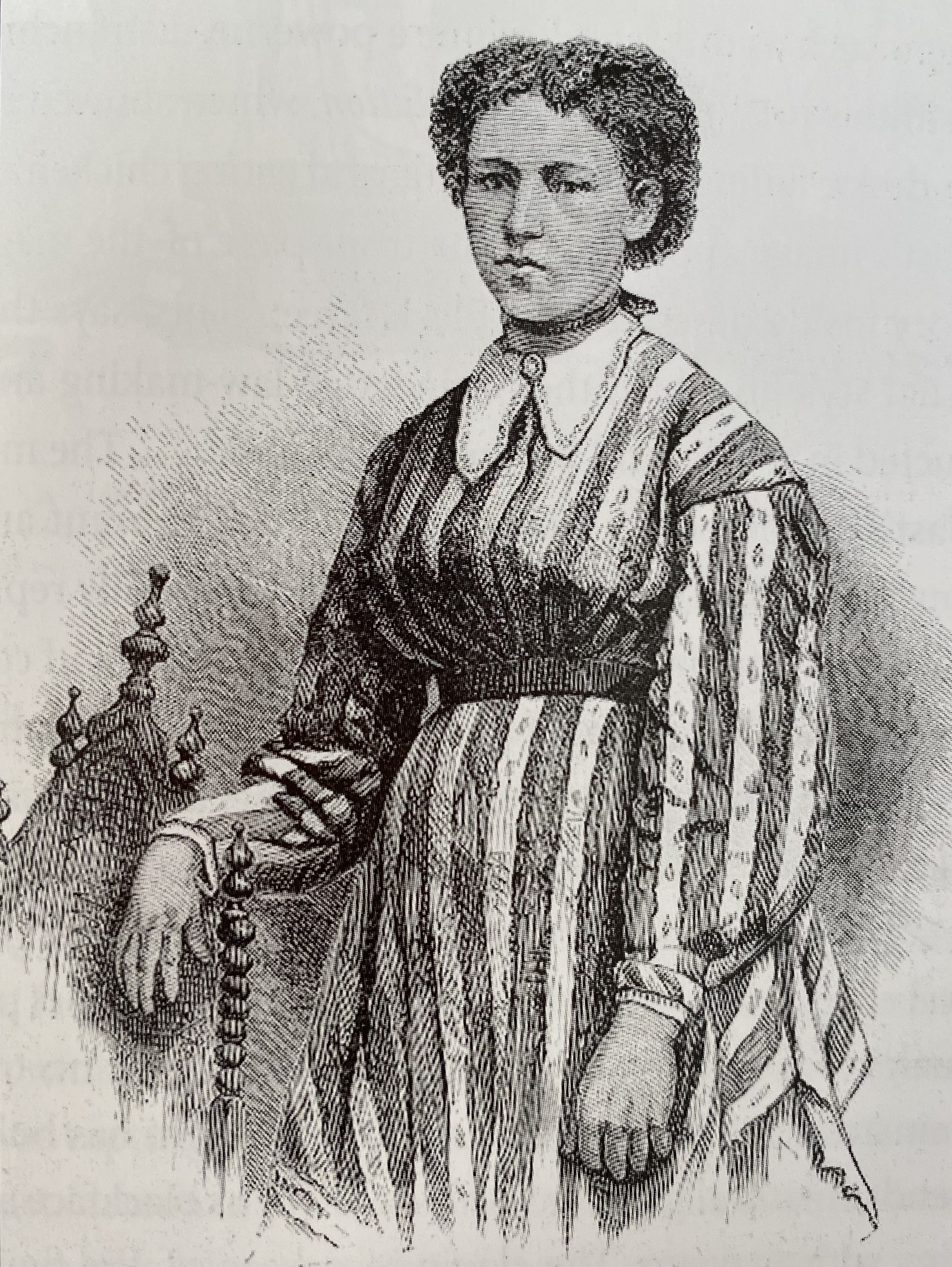
Julie Hayden, a 17-year-old Tennessee schoolteacher who was murdered by the White League in 1874.

Although sometimes linked to the secret vigilante groups the Ku Klux Klan and Knights of the White Camelia, the White League and other paramilitary groups of the late 1870s worked quite differently. They operated openly, solicited coverage from newspapers, and the men's identities were generally known. Similar paramilitary groups were chapters of the Red Shirts, started in Mississippi in 1875 and active also in North and South Carolina. Their explicit political goal was to overthrow the Reconstruction government, and to do so they directed their activities toward intimidation and removal of Northern and African American Republican candidates and officeholders. Made up of well-armed Confederate veterans, they worked to turn Republicans out of office, disrupt their political organizing, and use force to intimidate and terrorize freedmen to keep them from the polls. Backers helped finance purchases of up-to-date arms: Winchester rifles, Colt revolvers, and Prussian needle guns.

The first unit of the White League, founded in 1874, was composed of members of Christopher Columbus Nash's force, mostly Confederate veterans who had participated in the Colfax massacre. It expressed its purpose to defend a "hereditary civilization and Christianity menaced by a stupid Africanization."

In 1874, White League members murdered Julie Hayden, a 17-year-old African American girl who was working as a schoolteacher in Hartsville, Tennessee.

In his December 1874 State of the Union address, U.S. President Ulysses S. Grant expressed disdain over the White League's activities, condemning them for their violence and for violating the civil rights of freedmen:

I regret to say that with preparations for the late election decided indications appeared in some localities in the Southern States of a determination, by acts of violence and intimidation, to deprive citizens of the freedom of the ballot because of their political opinions. Bands of men, masked and armed, made their appearance; White Leagues and other societies were formed; large quantities of arms and ammunition were imported and distributed to these organizations; military drills, with menacing demonstrations, were held, and with all these murders enough were committed to spread terror among those whose political action was to be suppressed, if possible, by these intolerant and criminal proceedings.

— Ulysses S. Grant, State of the Union address, December 7, 1874.

The Coushatta massacre occurred in another Red River Parish: the local White League forced six Republican officeholders to resign and promise to leave the state. The League assassinated the men before they left the parish, together with between five and twenty freedmen (sources differ) who were witnesses. Generally in remote areas, the White League's show of force and outright murders always overcame opposition. They were Confederate veterans, experienced and well armed.

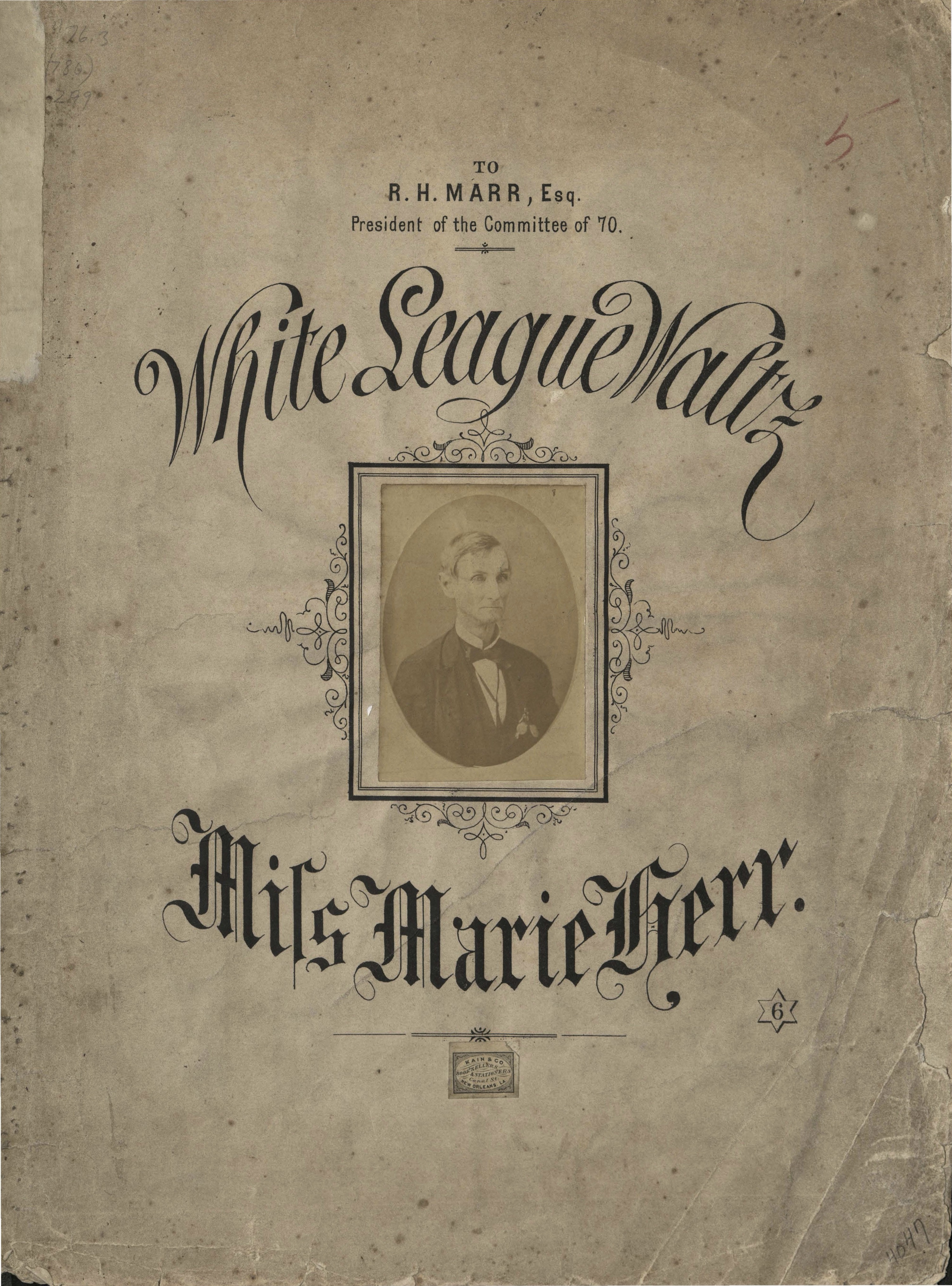
"White League Waltz", a song written to celebrate the Battle of Liberty Place

Later in 1874, the New Orleans Metropolitan Police, established as a state militia by the Republican Governor William Pitt Kellogg, attempted to intercept a shipment of arms to the League. The League had entered the city to try to take over state government, in the aftermath of the disputed 1872 gubernatorial election. In the subsequent Battle of Liberty Place on September 14, 1874, 5,000 members of the White League routed 3,500 police and state militia to turn out the Republican governor. They demanded the resignation of Kellogg in favor of John McEnery, the Democratic candidate. Kellogg refused, and the White League briefly fought a battle resulting in 100 casualties. They took over and controlled the State House, City Hall and arsenal for three days, withdrawing just ahead of Federal troops and ships arriving to reinforce the government. Kellogg had requested aid from Grant; once the troops arrived, he was restored to office.

Grant sent additional U.S. troops within a month in another effort to pacify the Red River valley in northern Louisiana. It had been plagued by violence, including the massacres at Colfax in 1873 and Coushatta in 1874. The White League was effective; voting by Republicans decreased and Democrats regained control of the state legislature in 1876.

== Legacy ==
A Battle of Liberty Place Monument was erected in New Orleans in 1891. The monument initially celebrated the Battle of Liberty Place, also known as the Battle of Canal Street, which was a failed coup d'état and riot led by White League paramilitary terrorists in September 1874. In December 2016, the city council voted to remove the monument, and its removal was upheld by a federal appeals court in March 2017.

== See also ==
- History of New Orleans
- Redeemers
