= Grant Parish, Louisiana =

Parish in Louisiana, United States

Coordinates: 31.59°N 92.56°W

- Parish
- Parish of Grant
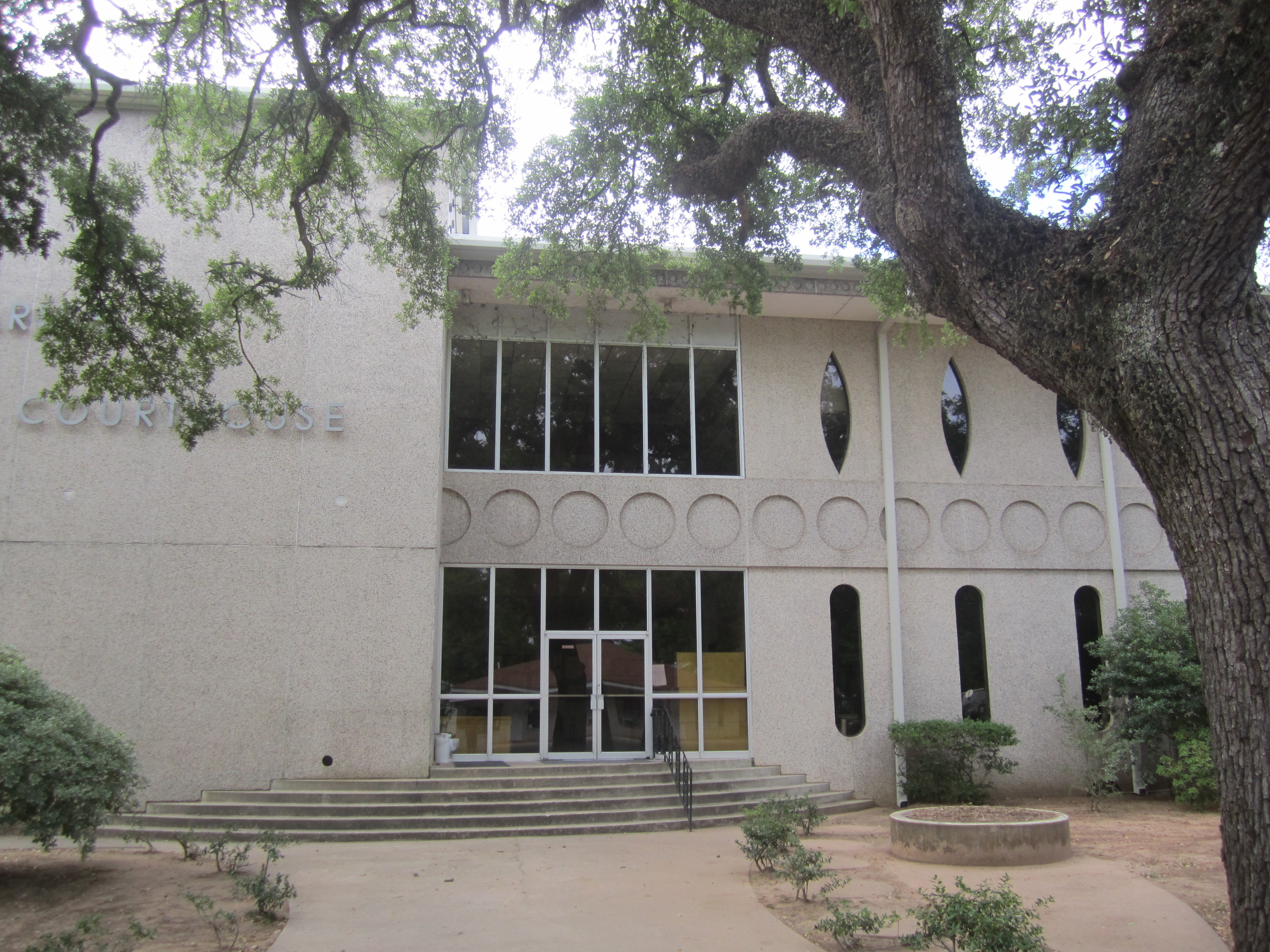
- Grant Parish Courthouse in Colfax

- Location within the U.S. state of Louisiana

- Louisiana's location within the U.S.
- Country: United States
- State: Louisiana
- Region: Central Louisiana
- Founded: 1869 (157 years ago)
- Named for: Ulysses S. Grant
- Parish seat: Colfax
- Largest town: Montgomery (area); Colfax (population)

Area
  - Total: 665 sq mi (1,720 km^{2})
  - Land: 643 sq mi (1,670 km^{2})
  - Water: 22 sq mi (57 km^{2})
  - percentage: 3.3 sq mi (8.5 km^{2})

Population (2020)
  - Total: 22,169
  - Estimate (2025): 22,075 ▼
  - Density: 34.5/sq mi (13.3/km^{2})
- Time zone: UTC-6 (CST)
  - Summer (DST): UTC-5 (CDT)
- Area code: 318
- Congressional district: 5th

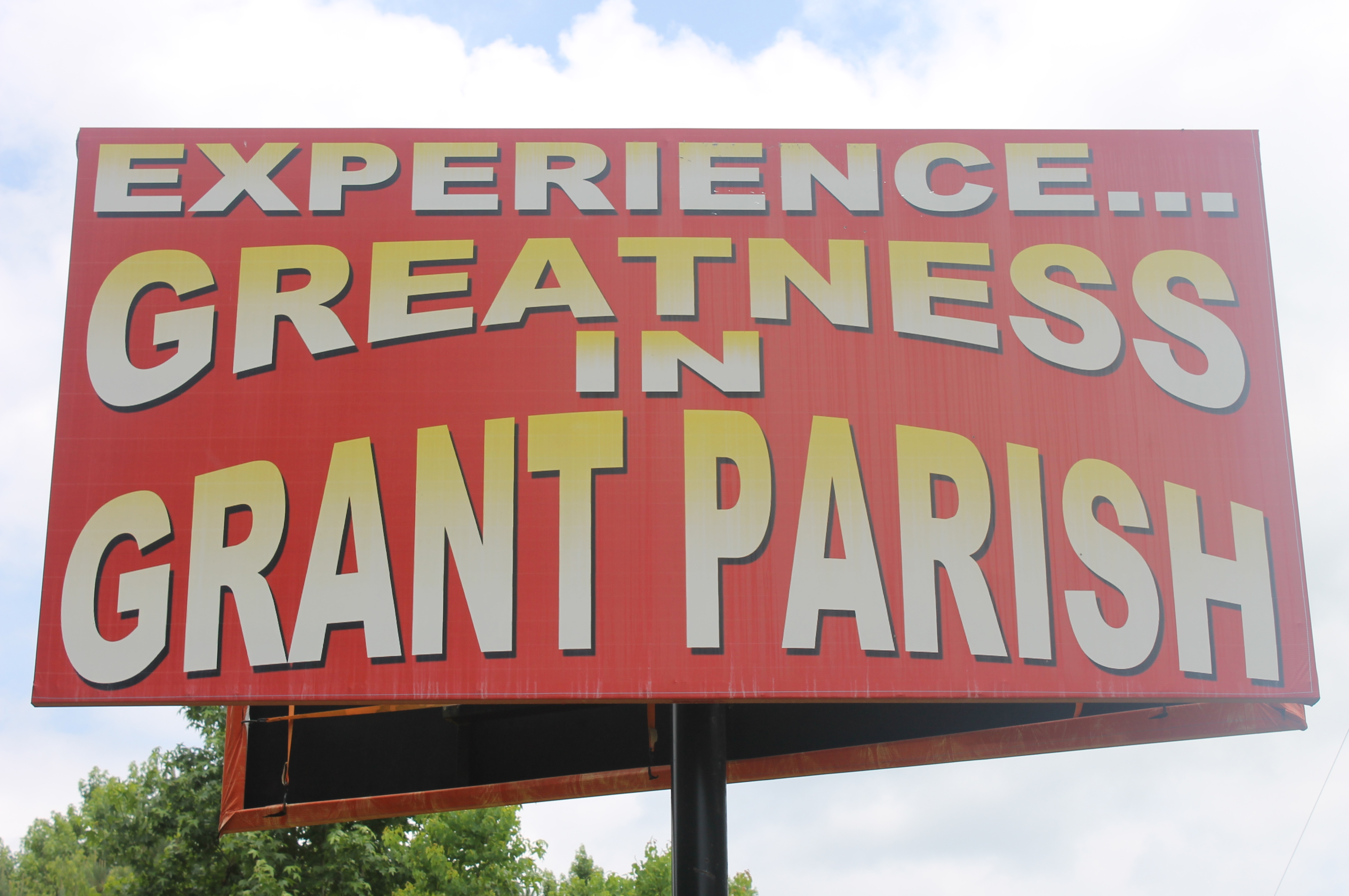

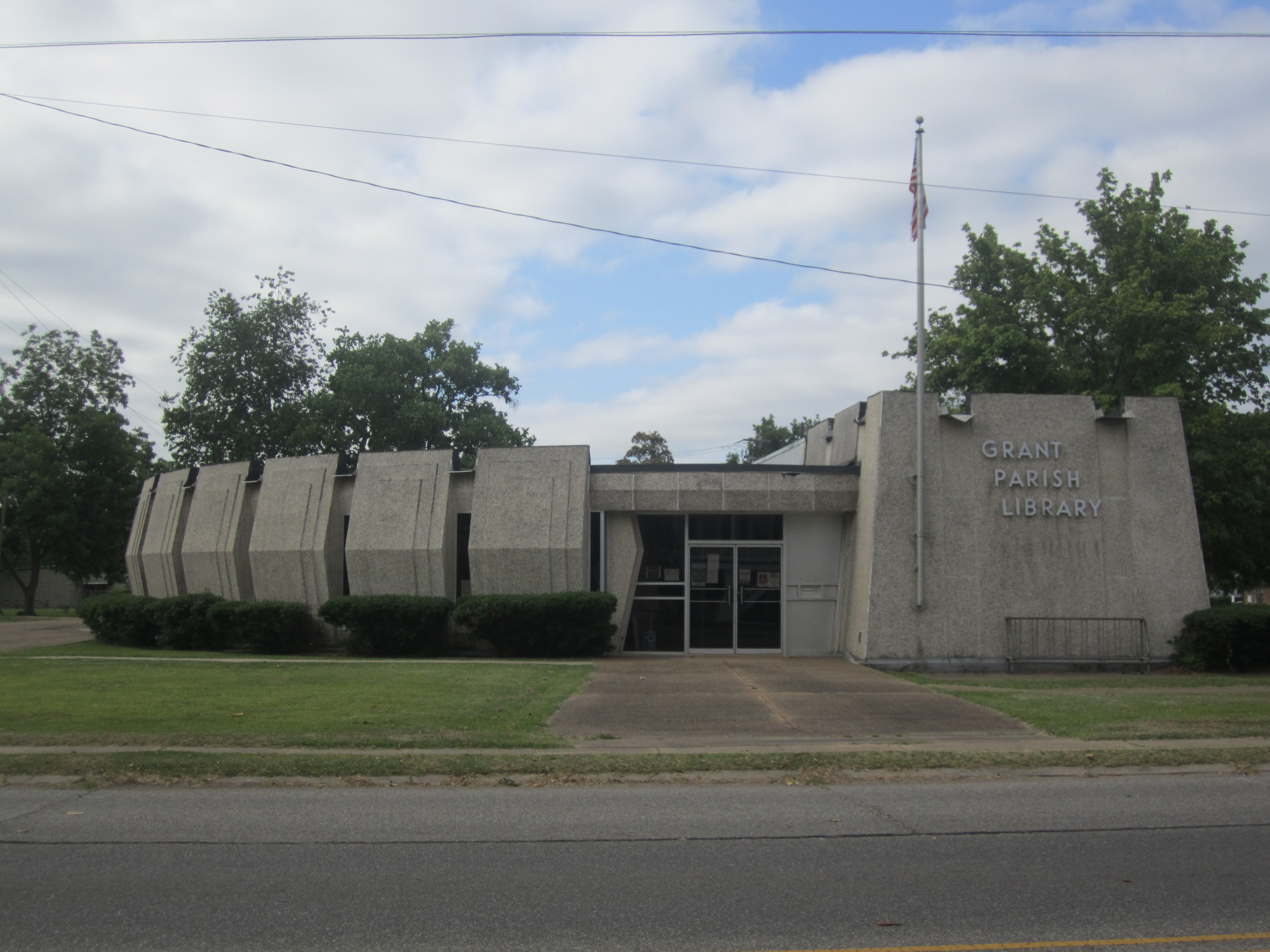
The Grant Parish Library is located near the courthouse.

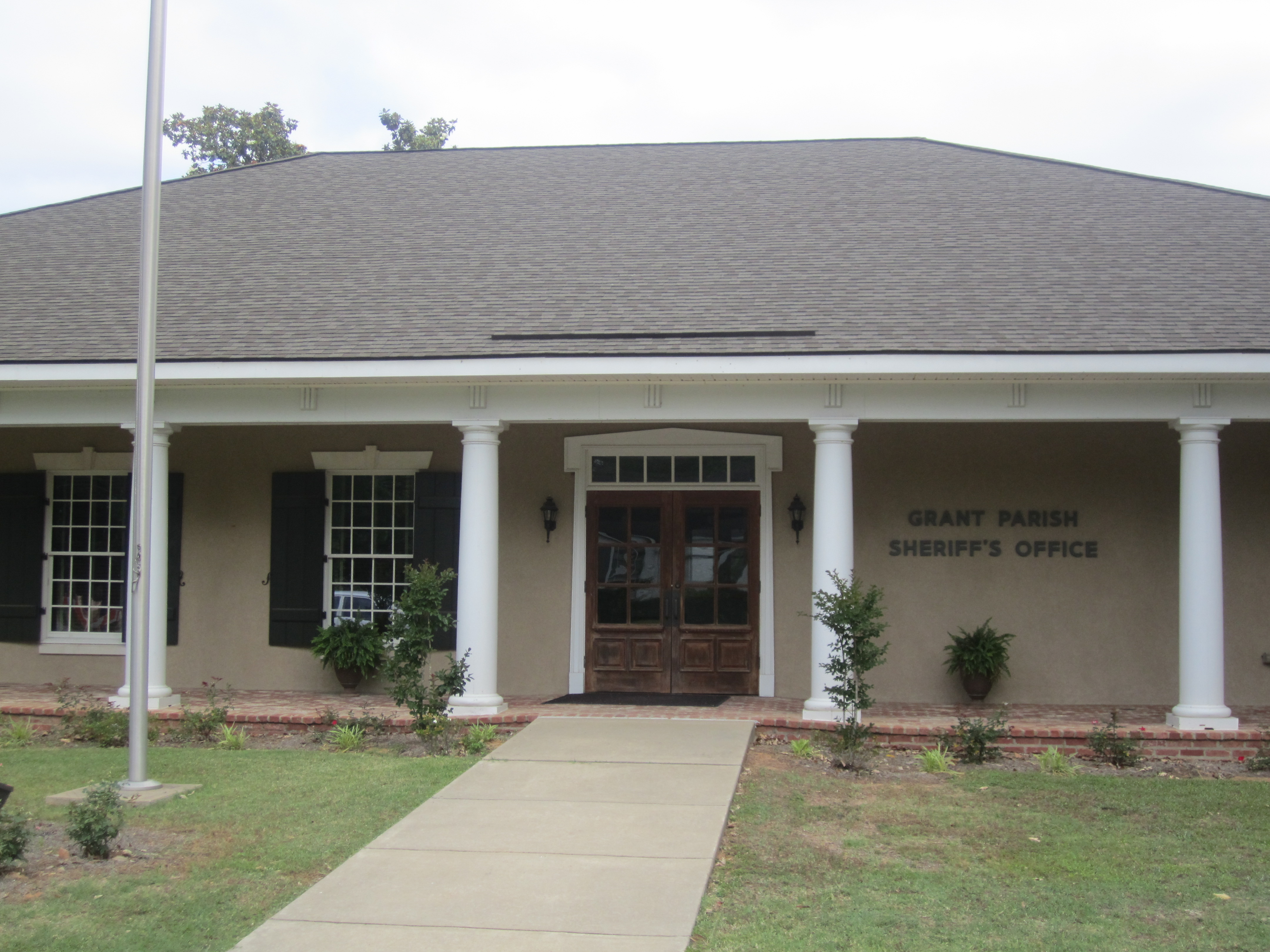
The Grant Parish Sheriff's Office is located behind the courthouse.

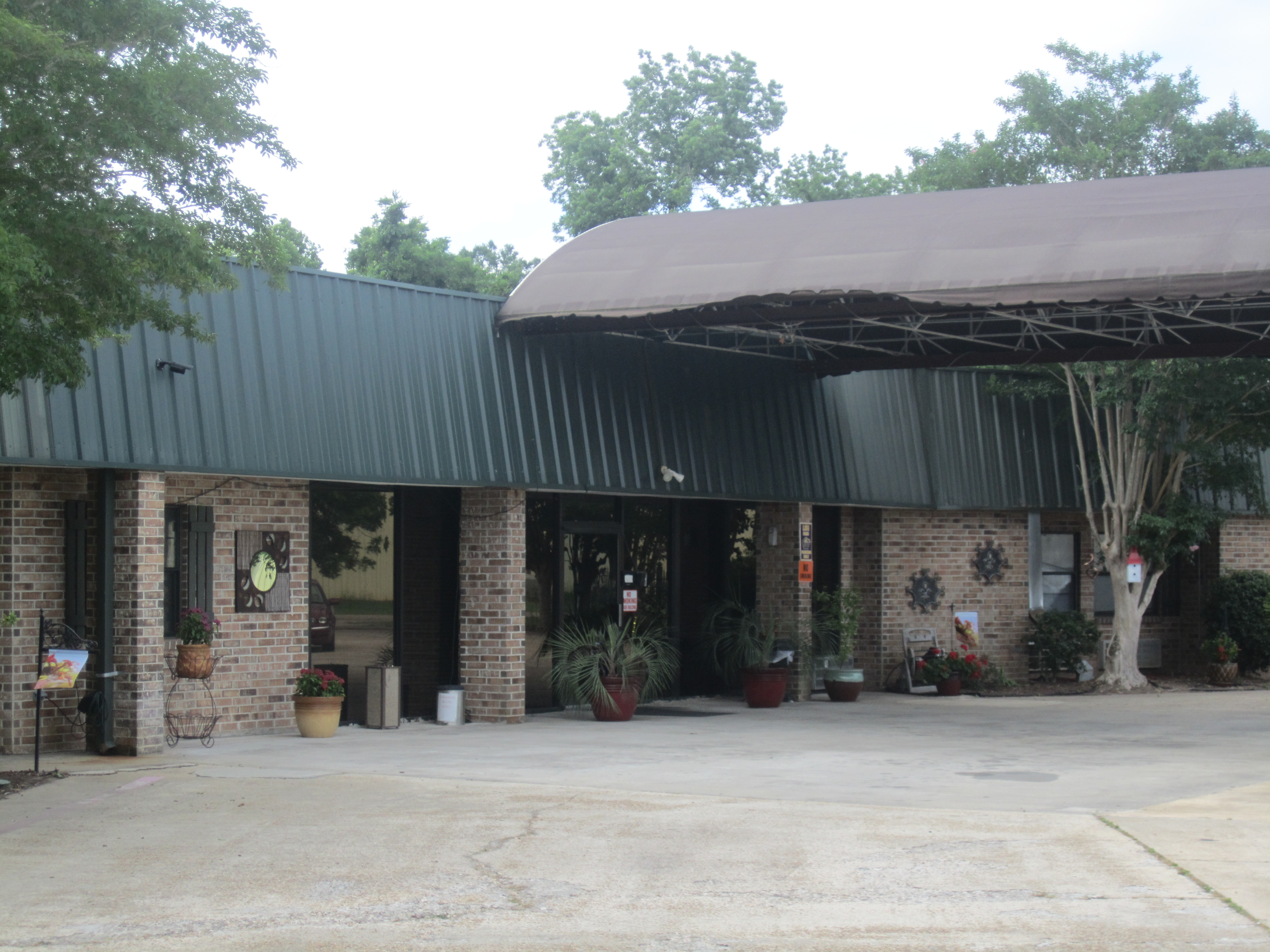
Colfax Reunion Nursing and Rehabilitation Home at 366 Webb Smith Drive in Colfax serves all of Grant Parish.

Grant Parish is a parish located in the North Central portion of the U.S. state of Louisiana. As of the 2020 census, the population was 22,169. The parish seat is Colfax. The parish was founded in 1869 during the Reconstruction era.

Grant Parish is part of the Alexandria, LA Metropolitan Statistical Area and Red River Valley. From 1940 to 1960, the parish had a dramatic population loss, as many African Americans from the plantation areas left in the Great Migration to seek better opportunities in the North and West. Such migration continued until about 1970. One of the eleven parishes organized during Reconstruction, Grant was created from parts of Winn and Rapides parishes.

Grant Parish is the site of United States Penitentiary, Pollock.

== History ==
Grant Parish was originally a part of the more populous Rapides Parish to the south. Prior to the American Civil War, the center of activity focused upon "Calhoun's Landing," named for the cotton and sugar planter Meredith Calhoun, a native of South Carolina. Calhoun also published the former National Democrat newspaper in what became Colfax, designated as the seat of government of the new parish.

Grant was one of several new parishes created by the Reconstruction legislature in an attempt to build the Republican Party in the state. Founded in 1869, it had a slight majority of freedmen, many of whom had worked on cotton plantations in the area. It was named for U.S. President Ulysses S. Grant. The parish seat of Colfax was named for Grant's first vice president, Schuyler M. Colfax (whose name is pronounced COAL-facks) of Indiana. However, the town of Colfax is pronounced CAHL-facks. The parish came into existence on March 4, 1869, which also was the day of President Grant's first inauguration. The parish encompassed both cotton plantations and pinewoods. It was one of several areas along the Red River that had considerable violence during Reconstruction, as whites tried to maintain social control.

The gubernatorial election of 1872 was disputed in the state, and both the Democrats and Republicans certified their slates of local officers. Two inaugurations were held. The election was finally settled in favor of the Republican candidates, but the decision was disputed in certain areas. As social tensions rose, Republican officials took their places at the courthouse in Colfax. They were defended by freedmen and state militia (mostly made up of freedmen), who feared a Democratic Party takeover of the parish. Amid widespread rumors, whites organized a militia and advanced on the courthouse on Easter Sunday, 1873. In the ensuing violence, three whites and 120-150 blacks were killed, including 50 that night who were held as prisoners. Leading late 20th-century historians renamed the Colfax Riot, the original state designation, as the Colfax Massacre. The total number of freedmen deaths were never established because some of the bodies were thrown into the river and woods.

The white militia was led by Christopher Columbus Nash, a Confederate officer who had been a prisoner of war at Johnson's Island in Ohio. It consisted of veterans from Grant and neighboring parishes. The following year, Nash gathered many of the white militia members as the basis of the first chapter of the White League. Other chapters quickly grew up across the state. The White League's organized violence in support of the Democratic Party included widespread intimidation of black voters. The League was integral to white Democrats' regaining power in the state by 1876. Soon after, they effectively disfranchised most blacks, a situation that persisted until after federal enforcement of Civil Rights-era legislation of the mid-1960s.

== Nativity scene ==
In December 2016, a courthouse nativity scene in Colfax drew a complaint from the New Orleans chapter of the American Civil Liberties Union. In a letter to the Grant Parish Police Jury, the ACLU said that officials must include secular symbols of the Christmas holiday if a nativity scene is placed alone on public property. District Attorney Jay Lemoine objected to the ACLU challenge in a statement to Alexandria Town Talk: "There have been various holiday displays presented both inside and outside the courthouse over many years. This year, as in years past, they include both secular and non-secular symbols. It is unfortunate that some are offended by these displays during this holiday season, as that was not the intent."

== Geography ==
According to the U.S. Census Bureau, the parish has a total area of 665 square miles (1,720 km^{2}), of which 643 square miles (1,670 km^{2}) is land and 22 square miles (57 km^{2}) (3.3%) is water.

=== Major highways ===
- U.S. Highway 71
- U.S. Highway 165
- U.S. Highway 167
- Louisiana Highway 8
- Louisiana Highway 34
- Louisiana Highway 122
- Louisiana Highway 123
- Louisiana Highway 158
- Louisiana Highway 366
- Louisiana Highway 471
- Louisiana Highway 472
- Louisiana Highway 492
- Louisiana Highway 500
- Louisiana Highway 502
- Louisiana Highway 524
- Louisiana Highway 1230
- Louisiana Highway 1239-1
- Louisiana Highway 1240
- Louisiana Highway 1241
- Louisiana Highway 3098
- Louisiana Highway 3130
- Louisiana Highway 3169

=== Adjacent parishes ===
- Winn Parish (north)
- La Salle Parish (east)
- Rapides Parish (south)
- Natchitoches Parish (west)

=== National protected area ===
- Kisatchie National Forest (part)

=== Fossil site ===
The most famous fossil sites within Louisiana are Creola Bluff at Montgomery Landing Site in the parish. The Montgomery Landing Site was a 500 meters (1,600 ft) long and 14 meters (46 ft) high bluff that was the cutbank on the east side of the Red River. It exposed the top of the Cockfield Formation, the Moodys Branch Formation, and Tullos Member of the Yazoo Clay. In 1979, it was the site of a large whale skeleton discovery.

== Demographics ==
Historical population
Census	Pop.	Note	%±
1870	4,517		—
1880	6,188		37.0%
1890	8,270		33.6%
1900	12,902		56.0%
1910	15,958		23.7%
1920	14,403		−9.7%
1930	15,709		9.1%
1940	15,933		1.4%
1950	14,263		−10.5%
1960	13,330		−6.5%
1970	13,671		2.6%
1980	16,703		22.2%
1990	17,526		4.9%
2000	18,698		6.7%
2010	22,309		19.3%
2020	22,169		−0.6%
2025 (est.)	22,075	▼	−0.4%
U.S. Decennial Census; 1790-1960 1900-1990; 1990-2000 2010

=== 2020 census ===
As of the 2020 census, the parish had a population of 22,169 residents and a median age of 39.4 years. 20.9% of residents were under the age of 18 and 15.8% were 65 years of age or older. For every 100 females there were 127.3 males, and for every 100 females age 18 and over there were 132.2 males age 18 and over.

The racial makeup of the parish was 79.9% White, 14.0% Black or African American, 0.9% American Indian and Alaska Native, 0.3% Asian, <0.1% Native Hawaiian and Pacific Islander, 0.5% from some other race, and 4.4% from two or more races. Hispanic or Latino residents of any race comprised 6.0% of the population.

<0.1% of residents lived in urban areas, while 100.0% lived in rural areas.

There were 7,823 households in the parish, of which 31.1% had children under the age of 18 living in them. Of all households, 48.3% were married-couple households, 19.8% were households with a male householder and no spouse or partner present, and 25.6% were households with a female householder and no spouse or partner present. About 27.8% of all households were made up of individuals and 12.0% had someone living alone who was 65 years of age or older.

There were 8,971 housing units, of which 12.8% were vacant. Among occupied housing units, 78.2% were owner-occupied and 21.8% were renter-occupied. The homeowner vacancy rate was 0.8% and the rental vacancy rate was 6.9%.

=== Racial and ethnic composition ===
Grant Parish, Louisiana – Racial and ethnic composition Note: the US Census treats Hispanic/Latino as an ethnic category. This table excludes Latinos from the racial categories and assigns them to a separate category. Hispanics/Latinos may be of any race.
Race / Ethnicity (NH = Non-Hispanic)	Pop 1980	Pop 1990	Pop 2000	Pop 2010	Pop 2020	% 1980	% 1990	% 2000	% 2010	% 2020
White alone (NH)	13,715	14,739	15,859	17,361	16,678	82.11%	84.10%	84.82%	77.82%	75.23%
Black or African American alone (NH)	2,782	2,521	2,212	3,441	3,060	16.66%	14.38%	11.83%	15.42%	13.80%
Native American or Alaska Native alone (NH)	24	78	157	205	193	0.14%	0.45%	0.84%	0.92%	0.87%
Asian alone (NH)	26	29	24	53	67	0.16%	0.17%	0.13%	0.24%	0.30%
Native Hawaiian or Pacific Islander alone (NH)	x	x	5	8	6	x	x	0.03%	0.04%	0.03%
Other race alone (NH)	4	6	5	3	42	0.02%	0.03%	0.03%	0.01%	0.19%
Mixed race or Multiracial (NH)	x	x	85	307	790	x	x	0.45%	1.38%	3.56%
Hispanic or Latino (any race)	152	153	213	931	1,333	0.91%	0.87%	1.14%	4.17%	6.01%
Total	16,703	17,526	18,560	22,309	22,169	100.00%	100.00%	100.00%	100.00%	100.00%

=== 2000 census ===
As of the census of 2000, there were 18,698 people, 7,073 households, and 5,276 families residing in the parish. The population density was 29 inhabitants per square mile (11/km^{2}). There were 8,531 housing units at an average density of 13 per square mile (5.0/km^{2}). The racial makeup of the parish was 85.43% White, 11.88% Black or African American, 0.89% Native American, 0.14% Asian, 0.03% Pacific Islander, 0.36% from other races, and 1.28% from two or more races. 1.14% of the population were Hispanic or Latino of any race.

The decreases in population from 1910 to 1920, and from 1940 to 1960, were chiefly caused by different phases of the Great Migration, as African Americans left segregation and oppression of the South to seek better opportunities in the North, during the first phase, and in the West, especially California's defense industry, in the second phase. Tens of thousands of migrants left Louisiana during times of agricultural difficulties and the collapse of agricultural labor after mechanization.

In 2000, there were 7,073 households, out of which 36.50% had children under the age of 18 living with them, 57.20% were married couples living together, 12.90% had a female householder with no husband present, and 25.40% were non-families. 22.60% of all households were made up of individuals, and 10.10% had someone living alone who was 65 years of age or older. The average household size was 2.61 and the average family size was 3.06.

In the parish the population was spread out, with 28.30% under the age of 18, 7.90% from 18 to 24, 28.10% from 25 to 44, 23.00% from 45 to 64, and 12.70% who were 65 years of age or older. The median age was 36 years. For every 100 females there were 96.10 males. For every 100 females age 18 and over, there were 93.00 males.

The median income for a household in the parish was $29,622, and the median income for a family was $34,878. Males had a median income of $31,235 versus $20,470 for females. The per capita income for the parish was $14,410. About 16.90% of families and 21.50% of the population were below the poverty line, including 27.30% of those under age 18 and 16.20% of those age 65 or over.

== Government and infrastructure ==
The Federal Bureau of Prisons U.S. Penitentiary, Pollock is located in an unincorporated area in the parish, near Pollock.

=== Politics ===
Today Grant Parish is majority white and votes strongly Republican. Mitt Romney polled 7,082 votes (81.7 percent) in his 2012 race against the Democrat U.S. President Barack H. Obama, who trailed with 1,422 votes (16.4 percent). In 2008, U.S. Senator John McCain of Arizona swept the parish, with 6,907 votes (80.7 percent) to Obama's 1,474 (17.2 percent). In every election since then, the Republican candidate has broken the record for the strongest performance by a candidate from that party in Parish history.

In 1992, George Herbert Walker Bush carried Grant Parish but was unsuccessful in his bid for reelection. He polled 3,214 votes (40.8 percent) to Democratic Governor Bill Clinton of Arkansas's 3,122 (39.6 percent). This son of the South carried numerous other Republican-leaning jurisdictions. Ross Perot, who later founded the Reform Party, polled 1,174 (14.9 percent). In 1996, Republican Robert J. Dole narrowly won in Grant Parish over U.S. President Bill Clinton, a son of the South, with 3,117 votes (42.8 percent) to 2,980 (40.9 percent). Ross Perot polled another 1,055 (14.5 percent).

The last Democrat to win in Grant Parish at the presidential level was former Governor Jimmy Carter of Georgia in his 1976 defeat of U.S. President Gerald R. Ford, Jr., who had Bob Dole as his vice-presidential partner.

United States presidential election results for Grant Parish, Louisiana
Year	Republican		Democratic		Third party(ies)	
Year	No.	%	No.	%	No.	%
1912	15	2.09%	446	62.20%	256	35.70%
1916	31	4.59%	640	94.81%	4	0.59%
1920	109	13.92%	674	86.08%	0	0.00%
1924	167	21.92%	595	78.08%	0	0.00%
1928	505	33.05%	1,023	66.95%	0	0.00%
1932	81	3.96%	1,966	96.00%	1	0.05%
1936	511	21.67%	1,847	78.33%	0	0.00%
1940	232	8.39%	2,534	91.61%	0	0.00%
1944	556	22.28%	1,939	77.72%	0	0.00%
1948	273	9.61%	1,120	39.44%	1,447	50.95%
1952	1,443	35.29%	2,646	64.71%	0	0.00%
1956	1,630	46.06%	1,542	43.57%	367	10.37%
1960	1,254	32.30%	1,219	31.40%	1,409	36.30%
1964	3,292	69.36%	1,454	30.64%	0	0.00%
1968	1,113	20.18%	932	16.90%	3,470	62.92%
1972	3,626	76.51%	859	18.13%	254	5.36%
1976	2,280	37.16%	3,670	59.81%	186	3.03%
1980	3,611	50.52%	3,290	46.03%	247	3.46%
1984	5,334	65.88%	2,588	31.96%	175	2.16%
1988	4,402	60.76%	2,628	36.27%	215	2.97%
1992	3,214	40.80%	3,122	39.63%	1,542	19.57%
1996	3,117	42.75%	2,980	40.87%	1,195	16.39%
2000	4,784	67.81%	2,099	29.75%	172	2.44%
2004	5,911	73.97%	1,977	24.74%	103	1.29%
2008	6,907	80.71%	1,474	17.22%	177	2.07%
2012	7,082	81.71%	1,422	16.41%	163	1.88%
2016	7,408	83.98%	1,181	13.39%	232	2.63%
2020	8,117	86.42%	1,157	12.32%	118	1.26%
2024	7,925	87.88%	996	11.04%	97	1.08%

== Education ==
Public schools in Grant Parish are operated by the Grant Parish School Board.

== National Guard ==
A Company 199TH FSB (Forward Support Battalion) resides in Colfax, Louisiana. This unit deployed twice to Iraq as part of the 256TH IBCT in 2004-5 and 2010.

== Communities ==
=== Towns ===
- Colfax (parish seat and largest municipality)
- Montgomery
- Pollock

=== Villages ===
- Creola
- Dry Prong
- Georgetown

=== Unincorporated areas ===
==== Census-designated places ====
- Prospect
- Rock Hill

==== Other communities ====
- Aloha
- Antonia
- Bentley
- Fishville
- Hargis
- Oak Grove
- Selma
- Verda

== Prison ==
Name	Address	Zip	Aged
Grant Parish Detention Center	Richardson Drive, Colfax, Louisiana	71417	18+

== Notable people ==
- W. K. Brown, state representative from Grant Parish from 1960 to 1972
- Joe T. Cawthorn (1911–1967), lawyer, businessman, and politician affiliated with the Long faction, born in Selma in Grant Parish, resided in Mansfield in DeSoto Parish
- Billy Ray Chandler, state representative from Grant Parish, 2006–2012
- Ed Head (1918–1980), Major League Baseball player who played for the Brooklyn Dodgers
- Russ Springer, Major League baseball player

== See also ==
- National Register of Historic Places listings in Grant Parish, Louisiana
