= Colfax, Louisiana =

Town in Louisiana, United States

- Town
- Town of Colfax
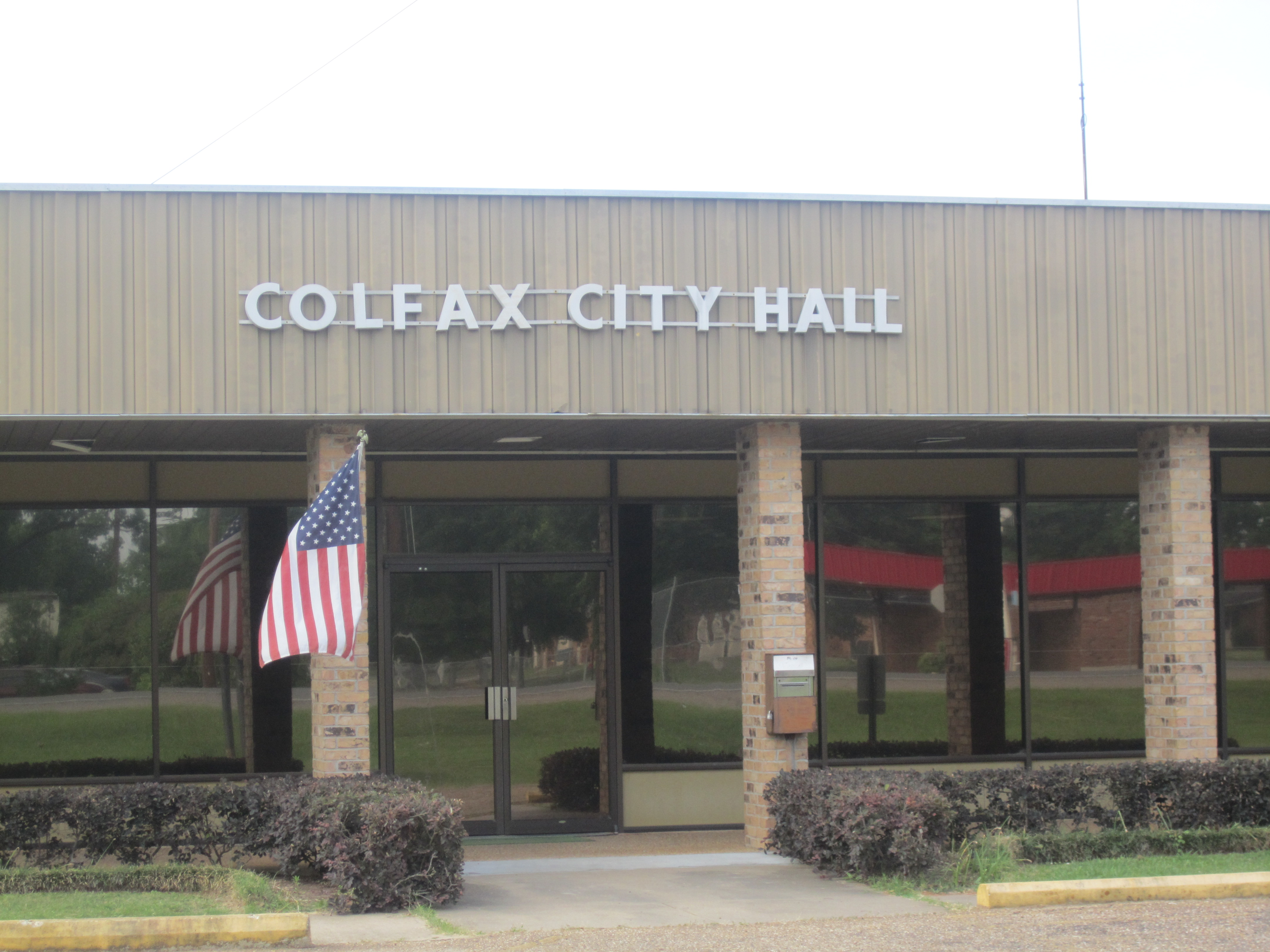
- Colfax City Hall

- Location of Colfax in Grant Parish, Louisiana

- Location within Louisiana Location within the United States
- Coordinates: 31°31′15″N 92°42′01″W
- Country: United States
- State: Louisiana
- Parish: Grant Parish
- Founded: 1869

Government
  - Type: Mayor

Area
  - Total: 1.50 sq mi (3.88 km^{2})
  - Land: 1.49 sq mi (3.86 km^{2})
  - Water: 0.0077 sq mi (0.02 km^{2})
- Elevation: 92 ft (28 m)

Population (2020)
  - Total: 1,428
  - Rank: GR: 1st
  - Density: 957.6/sq mi (369.73/km^{2})
- Time zone: UTC-6 (CST)
  - Summer (DST): UTC-5 (CDT)
- ZIP code: 71417
- Area code: 318
- FIPS code: 22-16375
- GNIS feature ID: 2406294

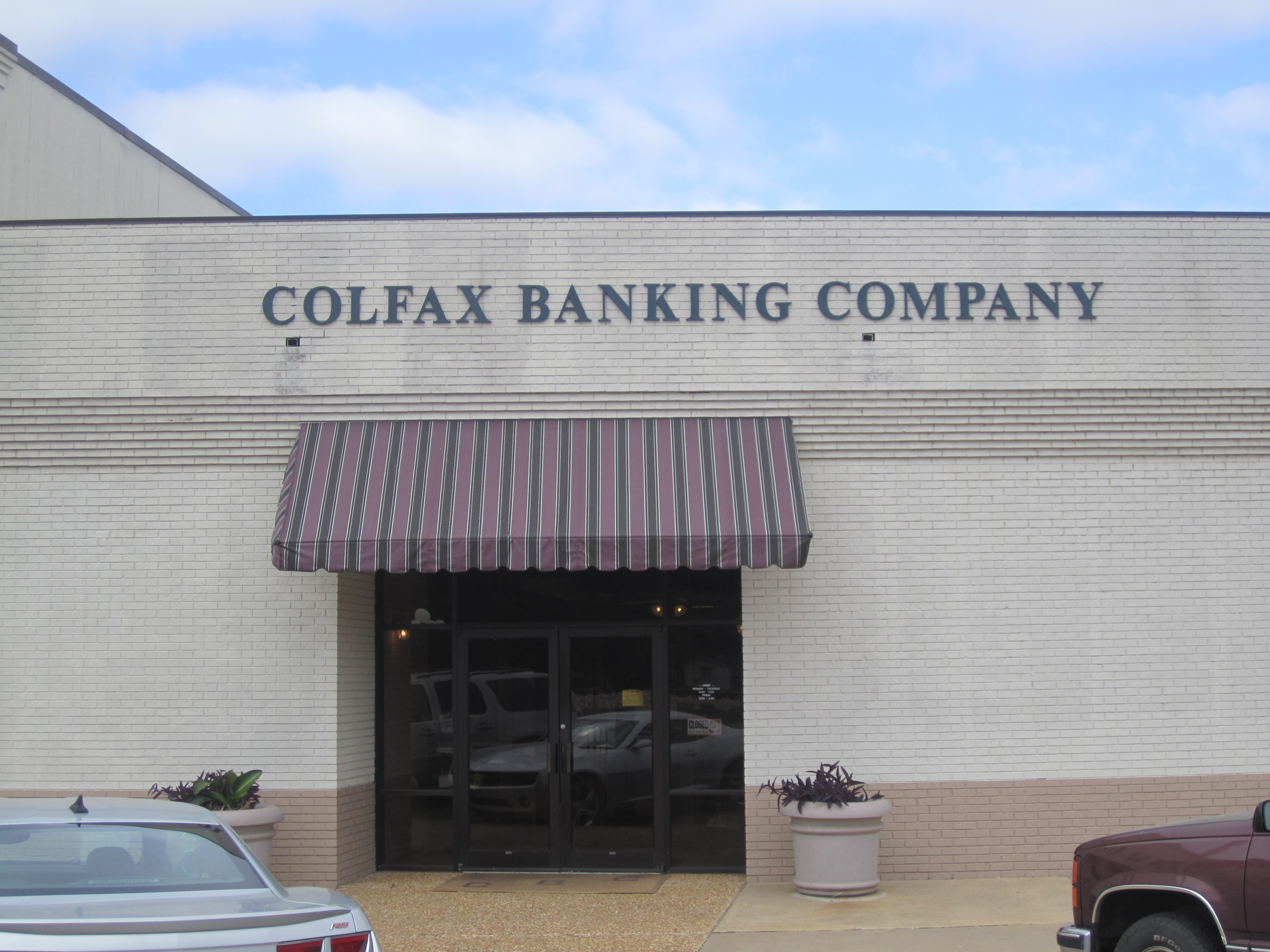
Colfax Banking Company

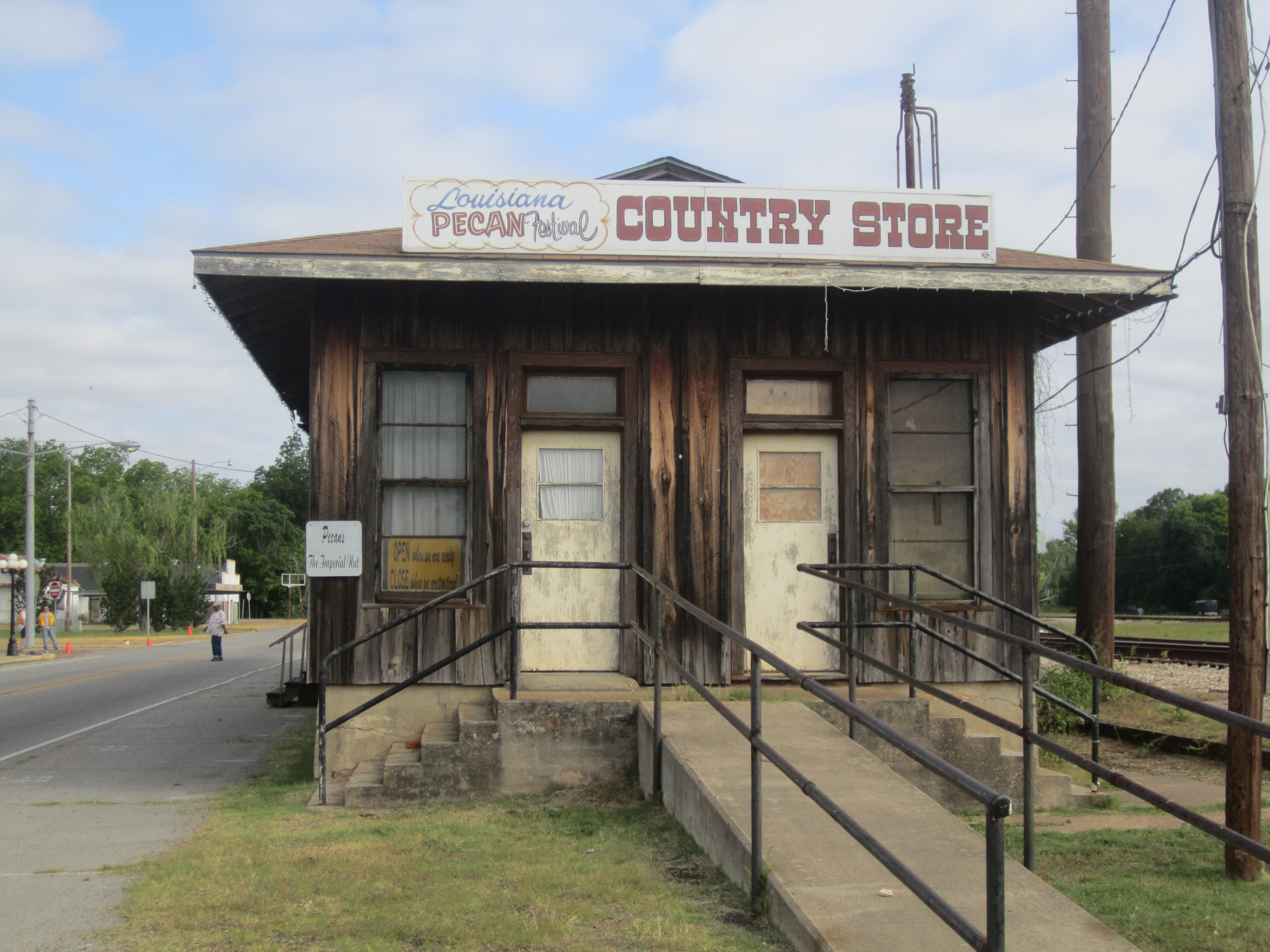
The Louisiana Pecan Festival Country Store is activated during the annual festival the first weekend of November.

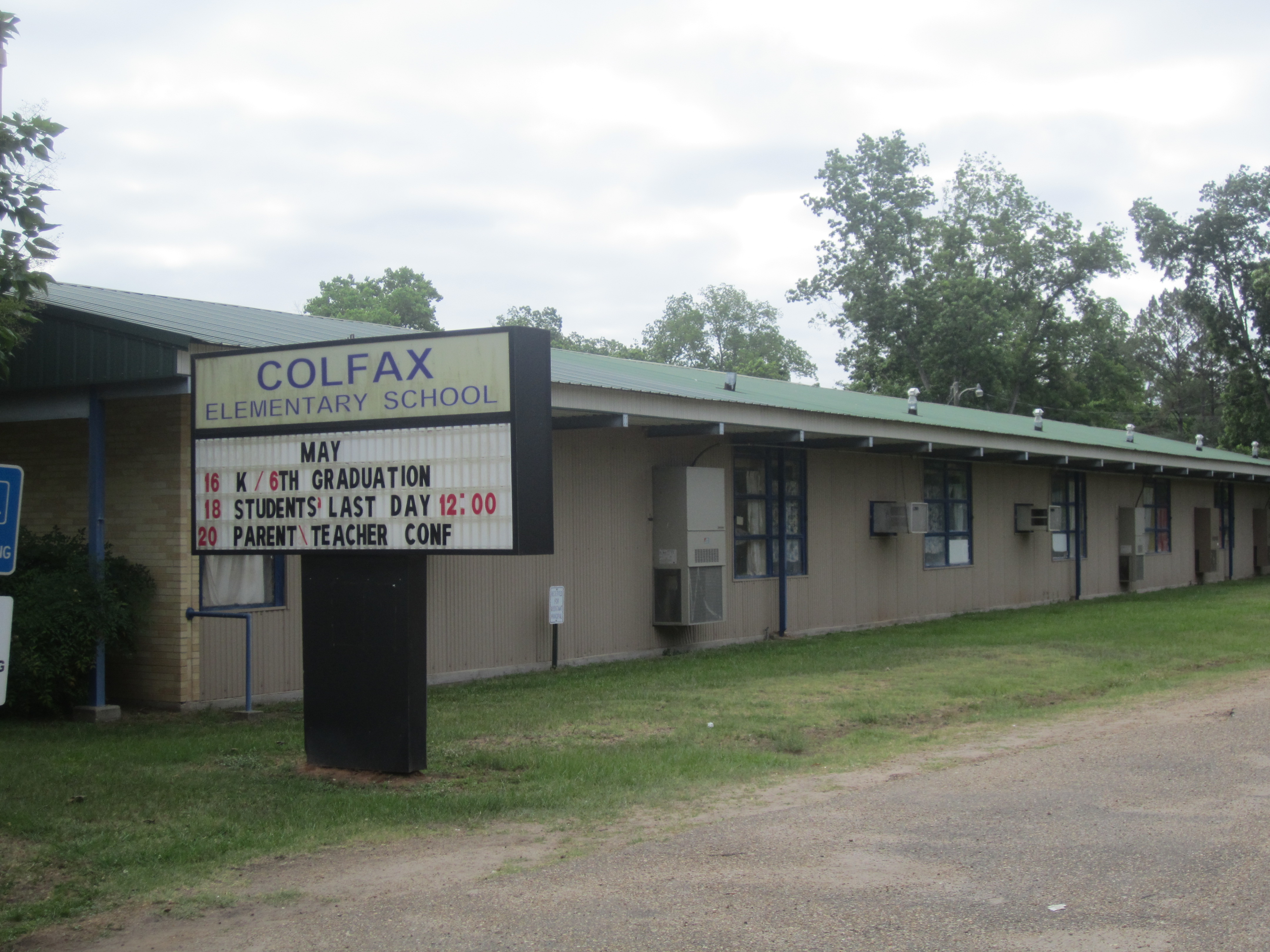
Colfax Elementary School; pupils in Colfax attend Grant High School in nearby Dry Prong.

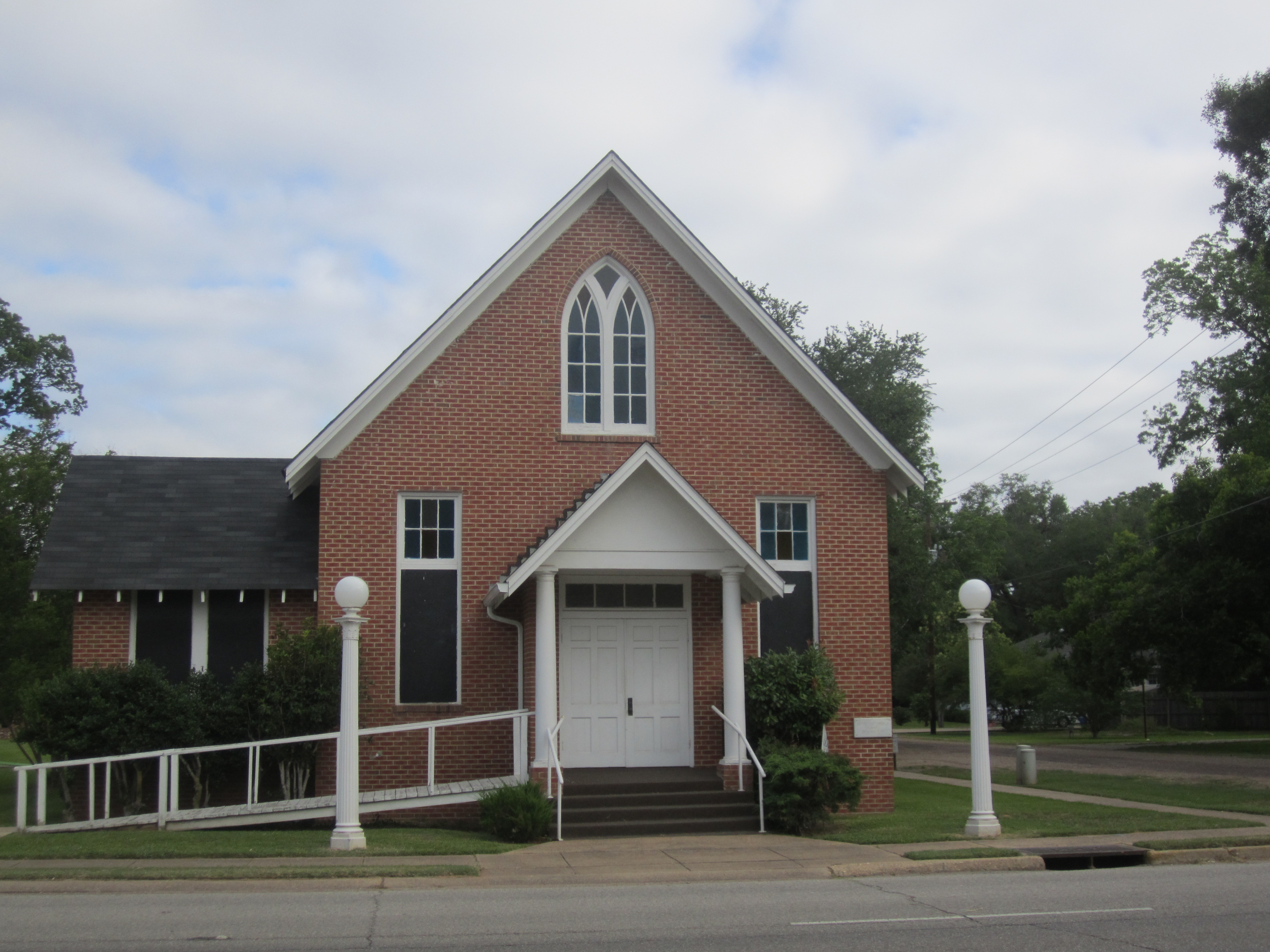
First United Methodist Church in Colfax

Colfax is a town in and the parish seat of Grant Parish, Louisiana, United States, founded in 1869. Colfax is part of the Alexandria, Louisiana metropolitan area. The largely African American population of Colfax was 1,428 at the 2020 census. The town was the site of the 1873 Colfax massacre.

== History ==
Colfax is most known for a Reconstruction Era massacre known as the Colfax massacre which took place Easter, April 13, 1873, to quell black voting. One hundred-fifty African Americans and three whites were killed in one of the most egregious acts of terrorism during Reconstruction. A white militia was led against freedmen by Christopher Columbus Nash, who claimed to have been elected sheriff on a Fusionist/Democratic slate. Freedmen were defending Republican officials at the county courthouse and had gathered there as tensions rose in a post-election dispute. A contemporary report by the U.S. military documented the three white fatalities and 105 black victims by name, with 15-20 unidentified blacks found in the Red River. The disproportionate number of deaths between whites and blacks, and documented accounts that at least 50 black prisoners were executed while unarmed and under control of the white militia, 20th-century historians redefined the "riot" as a "massacre". The event is significant because blacks, who comprised the majority in the parish, organized to defend themselves and their political rights and were mass murdered.

The riot arose from the disputed gubernatorial election of 1872, finally determined in the favor of the Republican William Pitt Kellogg by the federal government. Both the Fusion-Democrats and the Republicans held inaugurations and certified their own slates of local officers. Following the events of 1873, in 1874 Nash gathered many of the same men to establish the White League, a white supremacist paramilitary organization that operated on behalf of Democrats and eventually had chapters in many areas of Louisiana. It worked to intimidate and attack black voters, to run Republicans out of office, and to suppress black voting.

On April 13, 1921, the white citizens of Colfax unveiled a 12-foot (3.7 m) marble obelisk that read, "In Loving Remembrance, Erected to the Memory of the Heroes, Stephen Decatur Parish, James West Hadnot, Sidney Harris. Who fell in the Colfax Riot, fighting for White Supremacy, April 13, 1873."

In 1950 the state commerce department erected a historical marker identifying the site of the "Colfax Riot"; it says that the militia's victory "marked the end of carpetbag misrule in the South." Because of similar insurgent paramilitary violence in other areas of the state, especially during campaigns and elections, federal troops remained in Louisiana until 1877, when they were removed on orders of U.S. President Rutherford B. Hayes.

In 2007, the Red River Heritage Association was founded to collect and interpret the history of Reconstruction, especially in the Red River area and Louisiana. The association is raising funds to restore a bank in Colfax near the former courthouse site to use as a museum, archives and interpretive center.

== Geography ==
Colfax is located in western Grant Parish on the northeast side of the Red River. Louisiana Highway 8 passes through the center of town, leading east 2 miles (3 km) to U.S. Route 71 and south 12 miles (19 km) to Boyce. Alexandria is 26 miles (42 km) to the southeast.

According to the United States Census 2010, Colfax has a total area of 1.5 square miles (3.9 km^{2}), of which 0.01 square miles (0.02 km^{2}), or 0.54%, is water.

== Demographics ==
Historical population
Census	Pop.	Note	%±
1870	40		—
1890	161		—
1900	190		18.0%
1910	1,049		452.1%
1920	1,449		38.1%
1930	1,141		−21.3%
1940	1,354		18.7%
1950	1,651		21.9%
1960	1,934		17.1%
1970	1,892		−2.2%
1980	1,680		−11.2%
1990	1,696		1.0%
2000	1,659		−2.2%
2010	1,558		−6.1%
2020	1,428		−8.3%
2025 (est.)	1,393	▼	−2.5%
U.S. Decennial Census

=== 2020 census ===
Colfax racial composition
Race	Number	Percentage
White (non-Hispanic)	532	37.25%
Black or African American (non-Hispanic)	834	58.4%
Native American	1	0.07%
Asian	4	0.28%
Other/Mixed	41	2.87%
Hispanic or Latino	16	1.12%

As of the 2020 United States census, there were 1,428 people, 686 households, and 470 families residing in the town.

=== 2000 census ===
As of the census of 2000, there were 1,659 people, 600 households, and 408 families residing in the town. The population density was 1,111.3 inhabitants per square mile (429.1/km^{2}). There were 709 housing units at an average density of 474.9 per square mile (183.4/km^{2}). The racial makeup of the town was 67.81% African American, 30.98% White, 0.06% Native American, 0.06% Pacific Islander, 0.06% from other races, and 1.02% from two or more races. Hispanic or Latino of any race were 0.54% of the population.

There were 600 households, out of which 33.3% had children under the age of 18 living with them, 30.3% were married couples living together, 32.5% had a female householder with no husband present, and 32.0% were non-families. 30.3% of all households were made up of individuals, and 12.8% had someone living alone who was 65 years of age or older. The average household size was 2.55 and the average family size was 3.16.

In the town, the population was spread out, with 29.1% under the age of 18, 8.4% from 18 to 24, 24.4% from 25 to 44, 19.5% from 45 to 64, and 18.6% who were 65 years of age or older. The median age was 36 years. For every 100 females, there were 77.8 males. For every 100 females age 18 and over, there were 73.1 males.

The median income for a household in the town was $17,500, and the median income for a family was $20,000. Males had a median income of $25,313 versus $14,310 for females. The per capita income for the town was $10,155. About 36.3% of families and 41.0% of the population were below the poverty line, including 59.0% of those under age 18 and 25.3% of those age 65 or over.

== Economy ==
A facility burning explosives and munitions waste first opened in Colfax in 1985, and was licensed in 1993. Clean Harbors acquired it in 2002 from Safety-Kleen. The plant disposes of explosives and munitions waste by open burns from ammunition plants or defense contractors at "at least 42 locations across 22 states". In July 2017 it has been described as "the only commercial facility in the nation" allowed to do so without environmental emissions controls. It has been burning propellant waste from the Louisiana Army Ammunition Plant, 95 miles north.

== Political representation ==
Terry Ralph Brown, has been the District 22 state representative from Colfax; he is one of only two Independents in the Louisiana House of Representatives. His family moved to Colfax in 1817. In 2016, Brown sponsored a bill to ban open burning of hazardous waste in Louisiana.

== Education ==
Public schools in Grant Parish are operated by the Grant Parish School Board. As the former Colfax High School was consolidated into Grant High School in Dry Prong, the only remaining school in the town is Colfax Elementary School.

== Notable person ==
- Allison Kolb, Louisiana state auditor from 1952 to 1956, was born in Colfax
