= Martin, Louisiana =

- Village
- Village of Martin
- Location of Martin in Red River Parish, Louisiana.

- Location of Louisiana in the United States
- Coordinates: 32°06′52″N 93°15′06″W
- Country: United States
- State: Louisiana
- Parish: Red River

Area
  - Total: 11.59 sq mi (30.02 km^{2})
  - Land: 11.55 sq mi (29.91 km^{2})
  - Water: 0.039 sq mi (0.10 km^{2})
- Elevation: 190 ft (58 m)

Population (2020)
  - Total: 524
  - Density: 45.4/sq mi (17.52/km^{2})
- Time zone: UTC-6 (CST)
  - Summer (DST): UTC-5 (CDT)
- Area code: 318
- FIPS code: 22-48925
- GNIS feature ID: 2407496

Martin is a village in Red River Parish, Louisiana, United States. As of the 2020 census, Martin had a population of 524.

== Geography ==
According to the United States Census Bureau, the village has a total area of 11.6 square miles (30 km^{2}), of which 11.6 square miles (30 km^{2}) is land and 0.04 square miles (0.10 km^{2}) (0.34%) is water.

== Demographics ==
Historical population
Census	Pop.	Note	%±
1980	584		—
1990	545		−6.7%
2000	625		14.7%
2010	594		−5.0%
2020	524		−11.8%
2025 (est.)	494	▼	−5.7%
U.S. Decennial Census

As of the census of 2000, there were 625 people, 221 households, and 177 families residing in the village. The population density was 54.0 inhabitants per square mile (20.8/km^{2}). There were 249 housing units at an average density of 21.5 per square mile (8.3/km^{2}). The racial makeup of the village was 97.92% White, 1.12% African American, 0.48% Native American, 0.16% from other races, and 0.32% from two or more races. Hispanic or Latino of any race were 0.48% of the population.

There were 221 households, out of which 45.7% had children under the age of 18 living with them, 70.1% were married couples living together, 8.1% had a female householder with no husband present, and 19.5% were non-families. 18.6% of all households were made up of individuals, and 7.7% had someone living alone who was 65 years of age or older. The average household size was 2.83 and the average family size was 3.22.

In the village, the population was spread out, with 32.0% under the age of 18, 9.4% from 18 to 24, 29.3% from 25 to 44, 19.0% from 45 to 64, and 10.2% who were 65 years of age or older. The median age was 33 years. For every 100 females, there were 94.7 males. For every 100 females age 18 and over, there were 88.1 males.

The median income for a household in the village was $33,542, and the median income for a family was $40,714. Males had a median income of $29,000 versus $21,563 for females. The per capita income for the village was $14,184. About 9.3% of families and 12.6% of the population were below the poverty line, including 11.8% of those under age 18 and 16.9% of those age 65 or over.

== Education ==
Martin and all of Red River Parish are served by the Red River Parish School District. Zoned campuses include Red River Elementary School (Grades PK-5), Red River Junior High School (Grades 6-8), and Red River Senior High School (Grades 9-12).

Riverdale Academy, the only K-12 private school in Red River Parish, is located in the hamlet of East Point.

== Notable people ==
- H. M. Fowler, state representative from 1972 to 1986, graduated in 1937 from the former Martin High School.
