= Edgefield, Louisiana =

- Village
- Village of Edgefield
- Location of Edgefield in Red River Parish, Louisiana.
- Coordinates: 32°03′00″N 93°20′09″W
- Country: United States
- States: Louisiana
- Parish: Red River

Area
  - Total: 0.25 sq mi (0.64 km^{2})
  - Land: 0.25 sq mi (0.64 km^{2})
  - Water: 0 sq mi (0.00 km^{2})
- Elevation: 177 ft (54 m)

Population (2020)
  - Total: 204
  - Density: 822.2/sq mi (317.44/km^{2})
- Time zone: UTC-6 (CST)
  - Summer (DST): UTC-5 (CDT)
- Area code: 318
- FIPS code: 22-22850
- GNIS feature ID: 2407448
- Website: edgefield.myruralwater.com

Edgefield is a village in Red River Parish, Louisiana, United States. As of the 2020 census, Edgefield had a population of 204.

== Geography ==
According to the United States Census Bureau, the village has a total area of 0.2 square miles (0.52 km^{2}), all land.

== Demographics ==
Historical population
Census	Pop.	Note	%±
1970	201		—
1980	312		55.2%
1990	207		−33.7%
2000	190		−8.2%
2010	218		14.7%
2020	204		−6.4%
2025 (est.)	187	▼	−8.3%
U.S. Decennial Census

As of the census of 2000, there were 190 people, 83 households, and 59 families residing in the village. The population density was 750.2 inhabitants per square mile (289.7/km^{2}). There were 95 housing units at an average density of 375.1 per square mile (144.8/km^{2}). The racial makeup of the village was 96.84% White and 3.16% African American.

There were 83 households, out of which 25.3% had children under the age of 18 living with them, 59.0% were married couples living together, 9.6% had a female householder with no husband present, and 28.9% were non-families. 27.7% of all households were made up of individuals, and 16.9% had someone living alone who was 65 years of age or older. The average household size was 2.29 and the average family size was 2.78.

In the village, the population was spread out, with 21.1% under the age of 18, 7.9% from 18 to 24, 23.7% from 25 to 44, 24.7% from 45 to 64, and 22.6% who were 65 years of age or older. The median age was 43 years. For every 100 females, there were 82.7 males. For every 100 females age 18 and over, there were 87.5 males.

The median income for a household in the village was $25,521, and the median income for a family was $31,250. Males had a median income of $30,417 versus $21,250 for females. The per capita income for the village was $16,791. About 10.7% of families and 14.2% of the population were below the poverty line, including 17.9% of those under the age of eighteen and 16.0% of those 65 or over.

== Education ==
Edgefield and all of Red River Parish are served by the Red River Parish School District. Zoned campuses include Red River Elementary School (Grades PK-5), Red River Junior High School (Grades 6–8), and Red River Senior High School (Grades 9–12).

Riverdale Academy, the only K-12 private school in Red River Parish, is located in the hamlet of East Point.
