= Hall Summit, Louisiana =

- Village
- Village of Hall Summit
- Location of Hall Summit in Red River Parish, Louisiana.
- Coordinates: 32°10′36″N 93°18′20″W
- Country: United States
- State: Louisiana
- Parish: Red River

Area
  - Land: 1.67 sq mi (4.33 km^{2})
  - Water: 0.0039 sq mi (0.01 km^{2})
- Elevation: 226 ft (69 m)

Population (2020)
  - Total: 268
  - Density: 160.2/sq mi (61.87/km^{2})
- Time zone: UTC6- (CST)
  - Summer (DST): UTC5- (CDT)
- Area code: 318
- FIPS code: 22-32650
- GNIS feature ID: 2407472
- Website: hallsummit.municipalimpact.com

Hall Summit is a village in Red River Parish, Louisiana, United States. As of the 2020 census, Hall Summit had a population of 268, reflecting its close-knit community.

The governance of Hall Summit is overseen by an elected mayor and a board of aldermen. Currently, Jason Briggs serves as the mayor, leading the village with a focus on community development and citizen engagement. Supporting him on the board are aldermen Barbara Moore, Will Jiles, and Amelia Dyer, each of whom plays a vital role in shaping the community. The administrative operations of the village are managed by Rachal Henry, who acts as the town clerk, ensuring that all municipal functions run smoothly.

The town hall serves as the hub for local government activities and is open to all on Monday to Thursday, from 8 AM to 4 PM. This accessibility allows the community to engage with local officials, seek information, or address any concerns. Additionally, Town Hall meetings are conducted on the first Tuesday of each month at 7 PM, providing an opportunity for residents to voice their opinions, participate in discussions, and stay informed about village matters. These meetings foster community involvement and encourage collaboration among residents and local leaders.

== Geography ==
According to the United States Census Bureau, Hall Summit has a total area of 1.7 square miles (4.4 km^{2}), all land.

== Demographics ==
Historical population
Census	Pop.	Note	%±
1970	190		—
1980	276		45.3%
1990	227		−17.8%
2000	264		16.3%
2010	300		13.6%
2020	268		−10.7%
2025 (est.)	256	▼	−4.5%
U.S. Decennial Census

As of the census of 2013, there were 264 people, 101 households, and 75 families residing in the village. The population density was 157.8 inhabitants per square mile (60.9/km^{2}). There were 120 housing units at an average density of 71.7 per square mile (27.7/km^{2}). The racial makeup of the village was 90.53% White and 9.47% African American. Hispanic or Latino of any race were 1.52% of the population.

There were 101 households, out of which 35.6% had children under the age of 18 living with them, 54.5% were married couples living together, 15.8% had a female householder with no husband present, and 24.8% were non-families. 21.8% of all households were made up of individuals, and 9.9% had someone living alone who was 65 years of age or older. The average household size was 2.61 and the average family size was 3.04.

In the village, the population was spread out, with 28.0% under the age of 18, 4.5% from 18 to 24, 29.9% from 25 to 44, 18.9% from 45 to 64, and 18.6% who were 65 years of age or older. The median age was 37 years. For every 100 females, there were 101.5 males. For every 100 females age 18 and over, there were 95.9 males.

The median income for a household in the village was $31,042, and the median income for a family was $30,000. Males had a median income of $24,821 versus $25,000 for females. The per capita income for the village was $11,433. About 24.3% of families and 24.5% of the population were below the poverty line, including 34.6% of those under the age of eighteen and 23.7% of those 65 or over.

== Education ==
Hall Summit and all of Red River Parish are served by the Red River Parish School District. Zoned campuses include Red River Elementary School (Grades PK-5), Red River Junior High School (Grades 6-8), and Red River Senior High School (Grades 9-12).

Riverdale Academy, the only K-12 private school in Red River Parish, is located outside the parish seat of Coushatta.

== Notable person ==
- Clint Courtney, major league baseball player
