= The Times (Shreveport, Louisiana) =

American newspaper in Louisiana (founded 1871)

- Type: Daily newspaper
- Format: Broadsheet
- Owner: USA Today Co.
- Editor: Misty Castile
- Founded: 1871
- Headquarters: 401 Market Street; Shreveport, Louisiana, US
- Website: www.shreveporttimes.com

The Times is a daily newspaper based in Shreveport, Louisiana. Its distribution area includes 12 parishes in Northwest Louisiana and three counties in East Texas. Its coverage focuses on issues affecting the Shreveport-Bossier market, and includes investigative reporting, community news, arts and entertainment, government, education, sports, business, and religion, along with local opinion/commentary. Its website provides news updates, videos, photo galleries, forums, blogs, event calendars, entertainment, classifieds, contests, databases, and a regional search engine. Local news content produced by The Times is available on the website at no charge for seven days.

== History ==
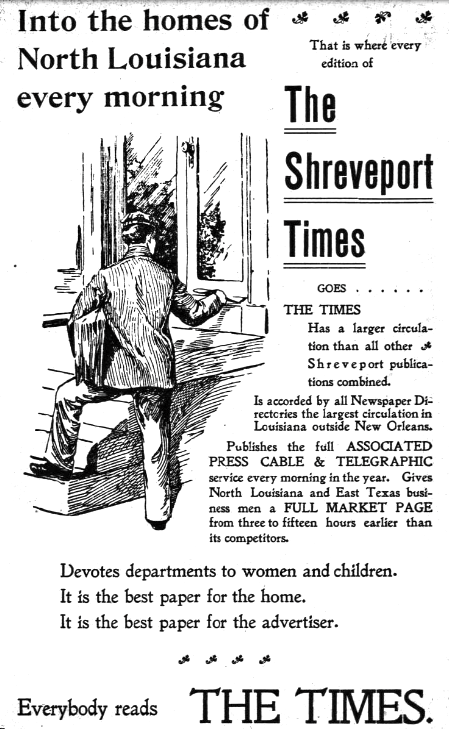
Advertisement for Shreveport Times, 1902

From 1895 to 1991, The Times had competition from the afternoon Monday-Saturday daily, the since defunct Shreveport Journal. The papers were later printed at the same 222 Lake Street address and shared opposite sides of the building, but were entirely separate and independent of the other. Publisher Charles T. Beaird, effective March 30, 1991, closed the Shreveport Journal for financial reasons stemming from sharply reduced circulation. Thereafter, the page opposite the editorial page of The Times, commonly called the op-ed page, was reserved as "The Journal Page" for editorial comment until December 31, 1999.

Following a massive downsizing of newspaper staffs in 2009 in cost-cutting moves across the country, The Times finalized efforts to trim its size as the second Gannett paper to install a Wifag offset press with modified tabloid format popular in Europe known as a Berliner. This format introduction into the U.S gave publishers another way to cut down on newsprint and save money. Prior, The Times had the last letterpresses remaining in the Gannett company, a Goss Headliner installed in 1961. Gannett invested in personnel at this time, bringing together three Rochester of Technology graduates to lead the organization.

Beginning in October 2017, The Times was no longer locally published because the distribution center in Shreveport closed to reduce production and labor costs. The Times instead is printed at another Gannett publication, the Longview News-Journal in Longview, Texas, a commute of 65 miles one-way. The Monroe News-Star, which had been published in Shreveport, is printed at the Jackson Clarion-Ledger in Jackson, Mississippi. The change is not expected to impact delivery schedules.

In March 2022, The Times moved to a six day printing schedule, eliminating its printed Saturday edition.

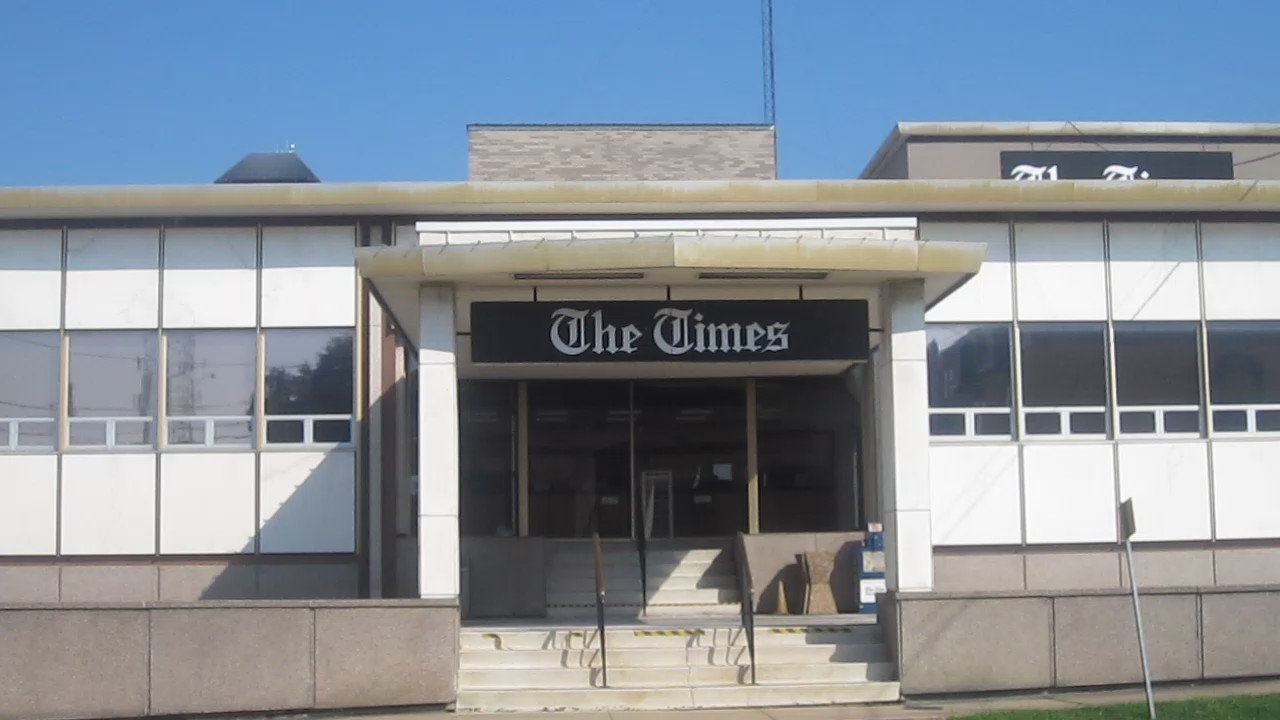
Shreveport Times office building on Lake Street in Shreveport

== Sections ==
- Main news (first section)
- Local
- Sports
- Classifieds
- Outlook(Sundays)
- Flavor (Wednesdays)
- Arts, culture and entertainment (Thursdays)
- Lagniappe (Home, garden and weekend guide) (Fridays)
- Autos (Saturdays and Sundays)
- Living (Sundays)
- Real Estate (Sundays)
- CareerBuilder (Sundays)
- Business (Sundays)
- Comics + TV Times (Sundays)
- High School Sports (in football season on Fridays and Saturdays)
- LSU section (in football season on Sundays)
- NFL section (in football season on Mondays)

== Publications and websites ==
- The Times daily newspaper
- shreveporttimes.com Online news and information
- LSUBeat.com Online news and information on LSU sports
- Get Healthy new monthly health news
- Red River Moms magazine monthly parenting and child information
- CareerBuilder Weekly weekly employment listings and career advice
- Cars.com NUMBER ONE source for new and used cars in NWLA
- Homefinder Top local real estate section (weekly on Sundays)

== See also ==
- H. M. Fowler, former mayor of Coushatta and a member of the Louisiana House of Representatives from 1972 to 1986, delivered The Shreveport Times in Coushatta in the 1950s.
