= Robert Charles Browne =

American murderer and suspected serial killer

- Born: October 31, 1952 (age 74); Coushatta, Louisiana, U.S.
- Conviction: First degree murder (2 counts)
- Penalty: Life imprisonment without the possibility of parole

Details
- Victims: 2 confirmed 9+ suspected 48–49 claimed
- Span of crimes: 1987 – 1991 (confirmed); 1970–1995 (alleged)
- Country: United States, possibly South Korea
- States: Colorado, others confessed
- Date apprehended: March 28, 1995
- Imprisoned at: Limon Correctional Facility, Limon, Colorado

Robert Charles Browne (born October 31, 1952) is an American murderer who is currently serving two life sentences for the murders of two teenage girls in Colorado Springs, Colorado, committed in 1987 and 1991, respectively. A few years into his sentence, he sent letters to the El Paso County Sheriff's Office in which he claimed to be a serial killer who has killed approximately 48 or 49 people since 1970 across several states.

Though most of his claims remain uncorroborated, Browne is considered a credible suspect in at least seven further killings, for which he has never been charged.

== Early life ==
Robert Charles Browne was born on October 31, 1952, in Coushatta, Louisiana, the youngest of nine children. His family ran a dairy farm; and his father, Ronald, later became a deputy sheriff in the Red River Parish Sheriff's Office. The family had a history of depression via his mother Buela's side, as his maternal grandfather had drowned himself in a cistern by weighing a chain around his neck. Despite this tragic event, the local townsfolk considered the Brownes to be a good family who greatly cared about all of their children.

While Browne was considered an intelligent child who was skilled in math, he had average grades at school, was considered a loner, and was known for his short temper. He dropped out of the Coushatta High School shortly before his 17th birthday to join the Army. During his service, he did two tours in Vietnam and one in South Korea; he was dishonorably discharged in 1976 for drug abuse. After returning to Louisiana, Browne found work in various businesses in Louisiana, Texas, and Colorado, including delivering flowers and working as a clerk at a Kwik-Stop. He married five times, each wife was petite and slim, and every marriage ended in divorce. Browne had one child from his second marriage, to a Vietnamese woman, a boy named Thomas. When asked, the latter three wives said that he would become physically abusive over the slightest mistake and would act irrationally; his fifth wife claimed that he had said he hated women and cops.

Browne's criminal record before his murder convictions included a conviction for car theft in Louisiana, a 1981 arrest warrant for stealing a church bell, and a 1986 conviction for stealing a pickup truck. There were also police reports that linked him to drug charges, burglaries, arsons, and incidents of animal cruelty.

== Murders ==
In his letters and conversations with investigators, Browne repeatedly claimed that he had murdered approximately 48 or 49 people, most of whom were women whom he considered to be of "low moral value", who had cheated on their boyfriends and husbands. Browne stated that most of his killings were not planned and were against victims of opportunity he met in motels, convenience stores, and similar settings, and that he killed them by various means, including strangulation; shooting; pushing them off high places, such as cliffs; stabbing them with screwdrivers and ice picks; and using ether and other compounds to incapacitate them. He has claimed to have dismembered the remains of most of the female victims and later disposed of their remains in isolated areas; because he usually had no personal connections with them or spent very little time with them, it was hard to link him to any of them.

About the specifics of his claims, Browne drew a map outlining several states with numbers indicating how many persons he had killed in each: 17 in Louisiana; 9 in Colorado; 7 in Texas; 5 in Arkansas; 3 in Mississippi; two each in California, New Mexico, and Oklahoma; and 1 in Washington State. The first of these alleged victims was a fellow soldier, whom he killed in 1970, while stationed in South Korea, supposedly during a bar fight over a woman.

Browne has provided few details about most of his purported kills, leading most investigators to believe that they are likely to be fabrications made for attention or to spite the sheriff's office involved in his first murder conviction. He has been convicted in two murders and is a credible suspect in the following others:

- Katherine Jean "Fuzzy" Hayes (March 1980; Coushatta, Louisiana): met Browne while hanging out at Uncle Albert's Chicken Stand parking lot and was offered a ride to his mother's house. Browne claimed he had consensual sex with the 16-year-old Hayes, but the pair got into an argument afterwards, leading him to strangle her with shoelaces after she had fallen asleep. He then dumped her body off a bridge between Clarence and Montgomery. Hayes' skull was found in the Little Nantachie Creek near Saint Maurice on October 16, and was identified on November 1.
- Faye Aline Self (March 30, 1980; Coushatta, Louisiana): last seen hanging out at a bar in Armistead with friends, but vanished after leaving the bar to pick up her child, whom she had left with her mother. Her car was left in the parking lot. According to Browne, he had taken notice of Self after meeting her at a nightclub and later sneaked into her apartment at the Rivertown Apartment Complex in Coushatta, while she was sleeping. Browne was the maintenance man for the complex and had keys to each apartment. Browne attacked Self using a rag soaked in red ant killer that contained methyl chloroform, or 1,1,1-Trichloroethane. However, Browne claims that while he searched for rope to tie her up with, Self suffocated to death and he later disposed of the body in the Red River. Self's body has never been found.
- Wanda Faye Hudson (May 27, 1980; Coushatta, Louisiana): a 20-year-old supermarket checker who also lived in the Rivertown Apartment Complex in Coushatta, where Browne worked maintenance and resided. He claimed that he broke into her apartment in the late hours of the night, used red ant killer containing methyl chloroform to render her unconscious, and then stabbed Hudson to death with a screwdriver. Her body was found by her boyfriend, Sonny Higgs, and an autopsy determined that she had been stabbed around 30 times and was possibly raped. The local community raised $4,000 as a reward for any information that could lead to an arrest in the case.
- Nidia Mendoza (February 6, 1984; Sugar Land, Texas): on February 6, 1984, Mendoza's body was found along Highway 59 near Houston. She had been decapitated and her legs had been severed, with approximately 25 stab wounds in the chest and four additional ones in the genitalia. An autopsy confirmed that she had been beaten and strangled prior to her death. In his confessions, Browne claimed to have met the 17-year-old at a strip club called Dames Nightclub and to have brought her to his hotel room, where they had sex. After this, he strangled Mendoza and dismembered her body with a dull butcher knife he found in the room's kitchenette.
- Melody Ann Bush (March 20, 1984; Flatonia, Texas): on March 25, 1984, Bush's body was found in a culvert in Flatonia, where it is believed she had been killed five days prior. An autopsy showed that the cause of death was the result of acute acetone poisoning, but Browne claimed he had used ether to make her unconscious and later stabbed her to death. He claimed to have met her in a motel bar, and she later accepted an offer to have sex with him in his motel room.
- Rocio Chila Delpilar Sperry (November 10, 1987; Colorado Springs, Colorado): on the aforementioned date, the 15-year-old Sperry went missing after going to the movies, with her husband Joseph finding her car in a parking lot on November 22. Browne claimed that he had dismembered her remains and scattered them in an isolated area, but they have never been found. Until Browne confessed and later pleaded guilty to this murder, Joseph Sperry was considered the suspect in his wife's disappearance, which he would later claim contributed to his drug addiction and multiple failed marriages.
- Heather Dawn Church (September 17, 1991; Colorado Springs, Colorado): abducted from her home in Black Forest, where she was babysitting her younger brother. Despite extensive police searches, the police were initially unable to find the 13-year-old Church. Over the years, her case was featured on multiple prominent true crime television shows, including America's Most Wanted, generating hundreds of tips. On September 16, 1993, Church's remains were found in Rampart Range Road by a transient camper, with the cause of death being ruled as blunt force trauma to the head. The only clue left behind at the crime scene were three fingerprints on a window screen, which were later used to conclusively link Browne to the crime.
- Lisa Marie Lowe (November 3, 1991; West Memphis, Arkansas): the body of 21-year-old Lowe, an alleged prostitute, was found floating in the St. Francis River three weeks after she was last seen alive. According to Browne, he met her in a blues club in Memphis, Tennessee and paid her to have sex with him, whereupon the pair drove to a wooded area near West Memphis, off the I-40. Browne said that after they had sex, he strangled Lowe and possibly may have shot her, before throwing her body in the river.
- Timothy Lee Warren (March 12, 1992; Tulsa, Oklahoma): in the early hours of March 12, 1992, an employee working in Tulsa's Mohawk Park found the body of 39-year-old Timothy Lee Warren on the shores of a lagoon. He had been shot twice in the head with a .22 caliber revolver, and was clad only in his pants, which had been wrapped around his thighs. His car was found several hours later near Claremore Lake. Browne claimed to have met Warren in a restaurant and convinced him to have sex with him at Mohawk Park, a well-known cruising location. After arriving at their destination and exiting their truck, Browne overpowered and shot him.

== Arrest, trial and imprisonment ==
In 1995, four years after Heather Church's abduction and two years after the discovery of her remains, new investigators focused on matching the evidence left at the crime scene, specifically the fingerprints left behind by the killer. The original investigators had searched only two AFIS systems. (AFIS-Automated Fingerprint Identification Systems). Tom Carney, a former Miami Police Investigator and a new investigator to the Colorado Springs Police Department, knew that not all AFIS systems were connected to each other. The Miami Police Department was the first city in the U.S. to fully operate an AFIS system in 1981. Carney spent two months researching AFIS systems throughout North America, including Canada and Mexico and discovered 92 separate AFIS systems that had not been searched. Carney contacted all 92 agencies with those systems and submitted the crime scene latent prints to each of them which ultimately led to a match to Browne through past felony convictions in Louisiana and California. Because of this, Browne was arrested and charged with Church's murder on March 28, 1995.

Not long after, Browne accepted a plea bargain proposed by the local District Attorney, in which he would plead guilty to Church's murder in exchange for the state not seeking the death sentence against him and would drop all additional charges (with the exception of first-degree murder). As a result, he was instead sentenced to life imprisonment without parole. Over the years, Browne started writing numerous cryptic letters to the El Paso County Sheriff's Office, one of which stated that "the score is you 1, the other team 48." Eventually, various investigators started privately communicating with Browne, who gradually revealed through poetry and prose that he had supposedly killed 48 or 49 people since 1970.

Whilst initially skeptical of his claims, interest in his confessions was bolstered after Browne accepted a plea deal relating to the 1987 murder of Rocio Sperry, for which he was given another life term. Shortly after his plea, investigators from the Mendoza reported that they were seeking a DNA link back to Browne, but nothing came out of this inquiry.

=== Veracity of claims ===
The reception towards Browne's claims have been mixed. While several seasoned investigators and writers specializing in studying serial killers, among them Robert Ressler and James Alan Fox, have stated that he is likely responsible for more murders than those for which he was convicted, they also believe Browne is exaggerating the number of victims. These doubts have been shared by family members of some of his supposed victims, most notably those of Faye Self, who have publicly stated that the real killer was another man.

Browne's interactions with investigator Charlie Hess were extensively detailed in an article published in The New York Times, titled "The Confessor". Some media outlets later criticized the article for facilitating blind belief in Browne's claims.

== Aftermath ==
As of February 2023, Browne is still alive and serving his sentence at the Limon Correctional Facility in Limon, Colorado. He remains convicted solely in the murders of Sperry and Church, and no further murders have been conclusively linked to him since.

== Bibliography ==
- Stephen Michaud and Debbie Price (September 2, 2008). The Devil's Right-Hand Man: The True Story of Serial Killer Robert Charles Browne. Berkley. ISBN 978-0425223215.
- Charlie Hess and Davin Seay (April 2, 2011). Hello Charlie: Letters from a Serial Killer. Atria Books. ISBN 978-1416544869.
- RJ Parker (March 25, 2012). The Serial Killer Compendium. CreateSpace Independent Publishing Platform. ISBN 978-1475017823.
