= Grand Bayou, Red River Parish, Louisiana =

Grand Bayou
- Unincorporated community
- Hamlet of Grand Bayou
- Location within the state of Louisiana Grand Bayou (the United States)
- Coordinates: 32°5′13″N 93°28′24″W
- Country: United States
- State: Louisiana
- Parish: Red River
- Time zone: UTC-6 (Central (CST))
  - Summer (DST): UTC-5 (CDT)
- GNIS feature ID: 543251

Grand Bayou is an unincorporated community in west central Red River Parish, Louisiana, United States. It is located near the intersection of Louisiana Highway 1 and U.S. Highway 84. The community can also be reached by using exit 172 of Interstate 49 in De Soto Parish and traveling north into Red River Parish.

Lloyd F. Wheat, a former state senator from Red River and Natchitoches parishes, formerly resided in Grand Bayou.

== Education ==
Public schools in Red River Parish are operated by the Red River Parish School District.

It is in the service area of Bossier Parish Community College.
