= Riverdale Academy =

Riverdale Academy may refer to:

- Riverdale Academy (Louisiana) – a private, non-denominational school in Red River Parish, Louisiana, U.S.
- Salanter Akiba Riverdale Academy – a coeducational, private Orthodox Jewish day school in Riverdale, The Bronx, New York City
