= Limon Correctional Facility =

State prison in Limon, Colorado, United States

- Location in Colorado
- Location: 49030 State Highway 71 South, Limon, Colorado, U.S.; 39.217925°N 103.691990°W
- Status: Operational
- Security class: Level IV (mixed custody: close, medium, and minimum restricted)
- Capacity: 938
- Opened: April 1991
- Managed by: Colorado Department of Corrections
- Warden: Gilbert Caley

The Limon Correctional Facility (LCF) is a state prison for men in Limon, Lincoln County, Colorado, operated by the Colorado Department of Corrections (CDOC). Opened in 1991, it is a Level IV, mixed custody institution with a rated capacity of 938 offenders, holding a combination of close custody inmates (about 33 percent) and medium and minimum restricted custody inmates (about 67 percent) across six general population units.

The facility holds some of Colorado's higher security male inmates and has been the site of several notable assaults and homicides involving both staff and prisoners. It was the focus of the 2009 season of the MSNBC documentary series Lockup.

== History ==
The Limon Correctional Facility opened in April 1991, built during a period of rapid growth in Colorado's prison population that had pushed the state's correctional system beyond its capacity.

In 2002, the killing of a correctional officer in the prison kitchen and a series of later assaults focused public attention on violence at the facility. After a 2007 attack in which an officer's throat was slashed, Travis Trani became LCF's warden in 2008, at the time the youngest warden in the Colorado system, and overhauled operations by restricting inmate movement among the six housing units in an effort to reduce gang activity and violence. Trani, a Pueblo native, later became warden of the Colorado State Penitentiary and a senior CDOC administrator.

In 2019, a campus of the Mid-America Baptist Theological Seminary was established inside the prison.

Terry Jaques served as the facility's warden until November 2024, when he introduced Gilbert Caley as his successor and Steven Gossett as the new associate warden before leaving to take office as a Lincoln County commissioner.

== Facility and operations ==
=== Layout and custody levels ===
LCF sits on 320 acres about two miles south of Limon and roughly 80 miles east of Denver. Of the site, 36 acres are enclosed by a double perimeter fence about 4,000 feet long. The facility has 13 buildings totaling about 377,400 square feet, including offender housing along with administrative, medical, educational, and work program space.

Inmates are held in one of six general population living units, each holding roughly 154 to 160 offenders, alongside a 28-cell restrictive housing unit. Units 1 and 2 hold close custody offenders, and Units 3, 4, and 5 hold medium custody general population. Units 4 and 6 operate as incentive units for medium, minimum restricted, and minimum custody offenders who take part in approved programs. The current warden is Gilbert Caley.

=== Programs ===
The facility offers educational and vocational programming consistent with CDOC standards, including High School Equivalency preparation, postsecondary coursework through partner colleges, and Career and Technical Education courses delivered through the Colorado Community College System. Behavioral and rehabilitative programs, faith-based services, the "Restoring Honor" veterans' pod, the seminary program, and work assignments through Colorado Correctional Industries are concentrated in the facility's incentive units, where participation is tied to good conduct.

=== Emergency response ===
As a Level IV facility, LCF maintains trained Emergency Response Team (ERT) and other specialized units that take part in statewide corrections emergencies. During the Crowley County Correctional Facility riot of July 20, 2004, a disturbance at a privately operated prison under contract with the CDOC in which 19 inmates were seriously injured, Limon's ERT was among the teams activated to help retake the facility, with about ten LCF staff deploying to perform inmate retention and security duties.

== Incidents ==
=== Staff assaults ===
In October 2002, inmate Edward Montour beat correctional officer Eric Autobee to death in the facility's kitchen, reported as the first killing of a Colorado corrections employee by an inmate in more than 70 years.

On September 12, 2007, inmate Allen Thomas slashed the throat of Pam Kahanic, a correctional officer who supervised the facility's industrial sewing program; the blade missed her jugular vein by a fraction of an inch. Kahanic survived and returned to work after recovering, while Thomas was convicted of attempted second-degree murder, sentenced to an added 24 years on top of an existing life sentence, and transferred to another prison.

On April 6, 2018, inmate Ryan Spear assaulted a correctional officer, causing injuries that required hospital treatment but were not life-threatening; staff subdued him without further injury.

In October 2020, an inmate seriously injured a correctional officer with a sharpened weapon, placing the facility on lockdown.

=== Inmate deaths ===
In 2015, inmate Joshua Edmonds, who was serving a sentence of 15 years, was strangled and killed at Limon; inmate Chad Wesley Merrill later pleaded guilty to the murder.

In 2016, inmate George McClain, 25, was found dead in a housing unit in a death investigated as a homicide.

On August 17, 2023, inmate Arthur Price beat and strangled fellow inmate Paul Hack, 65, in a cell and dragged the body down several flights of stairs; the killing was captured on facility surveillance footage. Price, who was already serving 36 years for a 2013 Arapahoe County murder, pleaded guilty to second-degree murder, first-degree assault, and abuse of a corpse, and in November 2025 was sentenced to an added 41.5 years.

=== Contraband and drugs ===
In May 2021, an inmate died of a fentanyl overdose; a correctional officer was exposed during the response, became ill, and was treated with naloxone. Five guards were later arrested for smuggling narcotics into the facility during 2021.

=== Gang activity ===
Officials have described gang violence as a recurring problem at Limon; the warden who took over in 2008 cited a rise in gang incidents as a reason for tightening restrictions on inmate movement. The 211 Crew, a white supremacist prison gang based in Colorado that the Southern Poverty Law Center has described as a particularly violent regional gang, has operated within the state prison system, and Chad Wesley Merrill, who killed Joshua Edmonds at Limon in 2015, was associated with the group. The 211 Crew drew national attention in 2013 when paroled member Evan Ebel killed CDOC executive director Tom Clements at Clements's home; investigators alleged Ebel may have acted on the gang's orders, though that question remained an open and disputed part of the investigation.

== Litigation ==
In 2004, inmate Jeffrey Heird was stabbed to death at Limon on March 28; fellow inmates David Bueno and Alejandro Perez were charged with first-degree murder, and prosecutors sought the death penalty against both. A Prowers County jury acquitted Perez in 2011. Bueno was convicted, but his conviction was later overturned after it emerged that prosecutors had withheld internal Department of Corrections reports identifying other suspects, a violation of Brady v. Maryland.

The CDOC's handling of inmate safety threats was litigated by John Standley Snorsky, who had agreed to testify about the 2015 Limon murder of Joshua Edmonds. After being transferred to the Colorado State Penitentiary, Snorsky was stabbed 43 times by three inmates in February 2017. In 2024 the state settled his federal lawsuit for $1.1 million, without admitting liability.

In Lomax v. Ortiz-Marquez (2020), the U.S. Supreme Court ruled unanimously against Limon inmate Arthur James Lomax, holding that a dismissal for failure to state a claim counts as a strike under the Prison Litigation Reform Act's three strikes provision whether or not it is entered with prejudice.

In Young v. Colorado Department of Corrections, Joshua Young, a former CDOC corrections sergeant, alleged that a mandatory equity, diversity, and inclusion (EDI) training created a hostile work environment for white employees and led to his resignation. After a federal district court dismissed the suit, the Tenth Circuit affirmed on March 11, 2024, but was sharply critical of the training and indicated that repeated exposure to such trainings could potentially support a hostile work environment claim. Young filed an amended complaint on remand; the district court dismissed it again, and on May 11, 2026, the Tenth Circuit affirmed once more, holding that a single EDI training, without more, does not meet the "severe or pervasive" standard required for a Title VII claim.

== Department of Justice investigation ==
On December 8, 2025, the United States Department of Justice Civil Rights Division notified Colorado governor Jared Polis that it was opening a pattern or practice investigation of all 21 Colorado Department of Corrections facilities, Limon among them, under the Civil Rights of Institutionalized Persons Act, the Violent Crime Control and Law Enforcement Act, and the Religious Land Use and Institutionalized Persons Act. The investigation was to examine whether the state failed to provide adequate medical care and safe, sanitary conditions of confinement, along with religious exercise and other concerns. Limon warden Gilbert Caley was among the facility wardens copied on the notice. The department stated that it had not reached any conclusions.

== In popular culture ==
Limon was the focus of the 2009 season of MSNBC's documentary series Lockup, which followed daily life at the prison and documented Warden Travis Trani's efforts to reduce violence. Westword described the facility at the time as a high security prison with "a troubled history of assaults and lockdowns."

== Notable inmates ==
- Robert Charles Browne, a serial killer serving two life sentences for the 1987 murder of Rocio Sperry and the 1991 murder of Heather Dawn Church in the Colorado Springs, Colorado area; he later claimed to have killed dozens of people across several states, though most of those claims are uncorroborated.
- Freddie Glenn, convicted in the 1975 murder of Karen Grammer, sister of actor Kelsey Grammer; later transferred to the Colorado State Penitentiary.
- Michael David Whyte, convicted in 2022 in the 1987 torture and murder of fellow soldier Darlene Krashoc near Fort Carson.
- Douglas J. Alward, a repeat prison escapee. In July 1991 he escaped from custody in Fremont County by overpowering a guard with the help of another inmate, and was recaptured in Oregon after kidnapping a man and shooting at a police officer. In August 2010, while serving a sentence of 20 to 40 years for attempted murder, assault, burglary, and kidnapping, he escaped from the Sterling Correctional Facility through what officials called a secure perimeter, months before he was due to become eligible for parole, prompting a multi-agency manhunt. He was later returned to custody and, as of 2026, is held at Limon.
