= Bennie Logan =

American football player (born 1989)

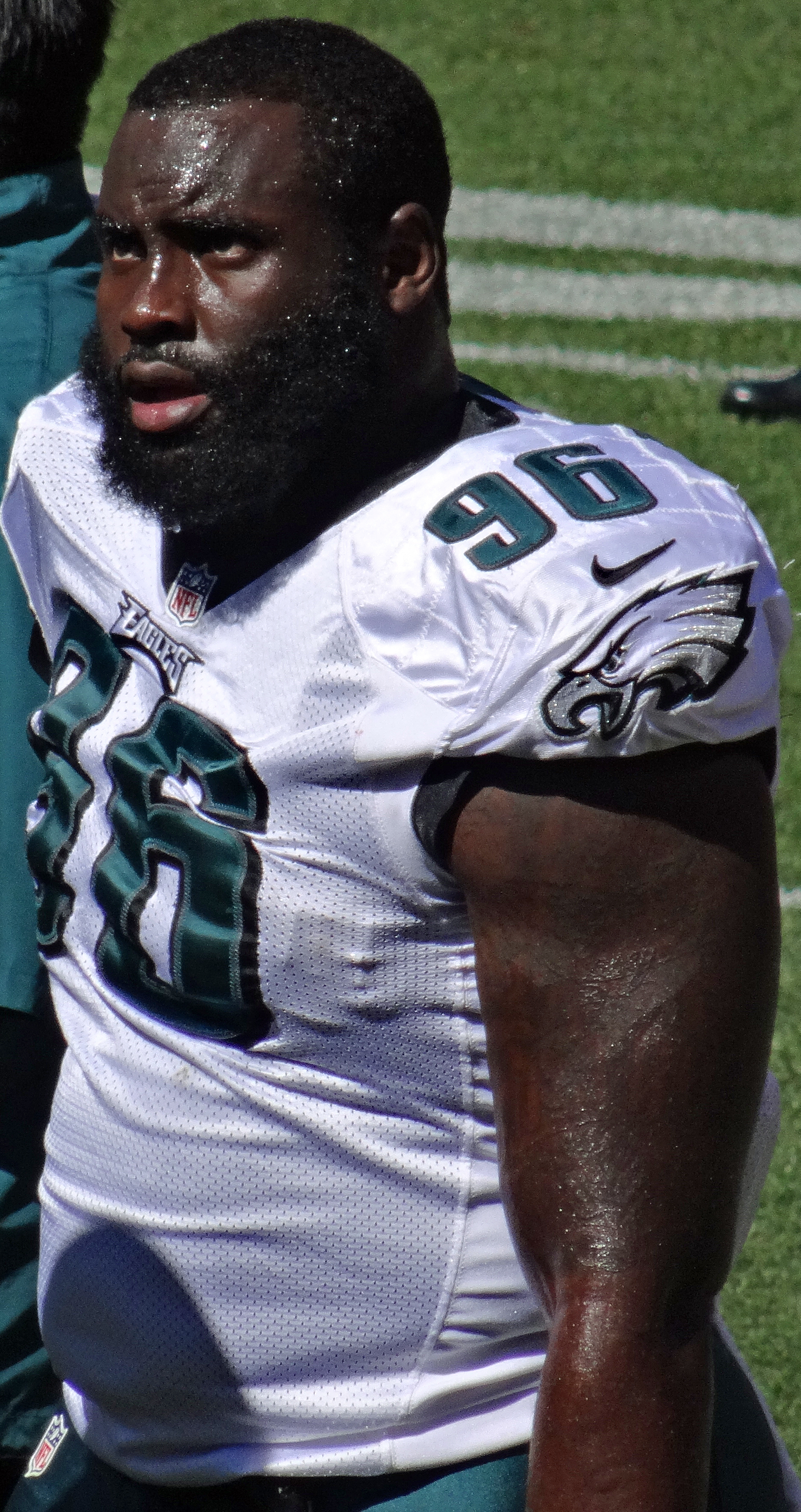
- Logan with the Philadelphia Eagles in 2013

No. 96
- Position: Nose tackle

Personal information
- Born: December 28, 1989 (age 36); Coushatta, Louisiana, U.S.
- Listed height: 6 ft 2 in (1.88 m)
- Listed weight: 315 lb (143 kg)

Career information
- High school: Red River (Coushatta)
- College: LSU (2009–2012)
- NFL draft: 2013: 3rd round, 67th overall pick

Career history
- Philadelphia Eagles (2013–2016); Kansas City Chiefs (2017); Tennessee Titans (2018)

Awards and highlights
- First-team All-American (2012); Second-team All-SEC (2012)

Career NFL statistics
- Total tackles: 230
- Sacks: 7
- Forced fumbles: 3
- Fumble recoveries: 2
- Stats at Pro Football Reference

Bennie Cordell Logan (born December 28, 1989) is an American former professional football player who was a nose tackle in the National Football League (NFL). He played college football for the LSU Tigers, earning first-team All-American honors in 2012. He was selected by the Philadelphia Eagles in the third round of the 2013 NFL draft.

== Early life ==
Logan was born in Shreveport, Louisiana on December 28, 1989, and grew up with seven brothers and sisters. He attended Red River Senior High School in Coushatta, Louisiana, where he was a defensive end for four years on the Red River Bulldogs high school football team. He was named to the Class 2A all-state first team in his junior and senior seasons. On October 17, 2014, head coach Reginald Prealow retired Bennie's high school number 60 and Bennie was there to accept it.

== College career ==
While attending Louisiana State University, Logan played for coach Les Miles's LSU Tigers football team from 2009 to 2012. After redshirting during the 2009 season, he played three games in 2010 and had five tackles, including 0.5 for a loss. In 2011, he played 14 games and had 57 tackles, including 6.5 for a loss, and three quarterback sacks. He had six tackles, including 1.5 for a loss, and one sack in the BCS Championship Game against the Alabama Crimson Tide.

In 2012, Logan had 45 tackles, including 5.5 for a loss, and two sacks. He had a season-high nine tackles in the 2012 Chick-fil-A Bowl. He was named an All-American by Pro Football Weekly. After the 2012 season, Logan declared for the NFL draft.

== Professional career ==
=== Philadelphia Eagles ===
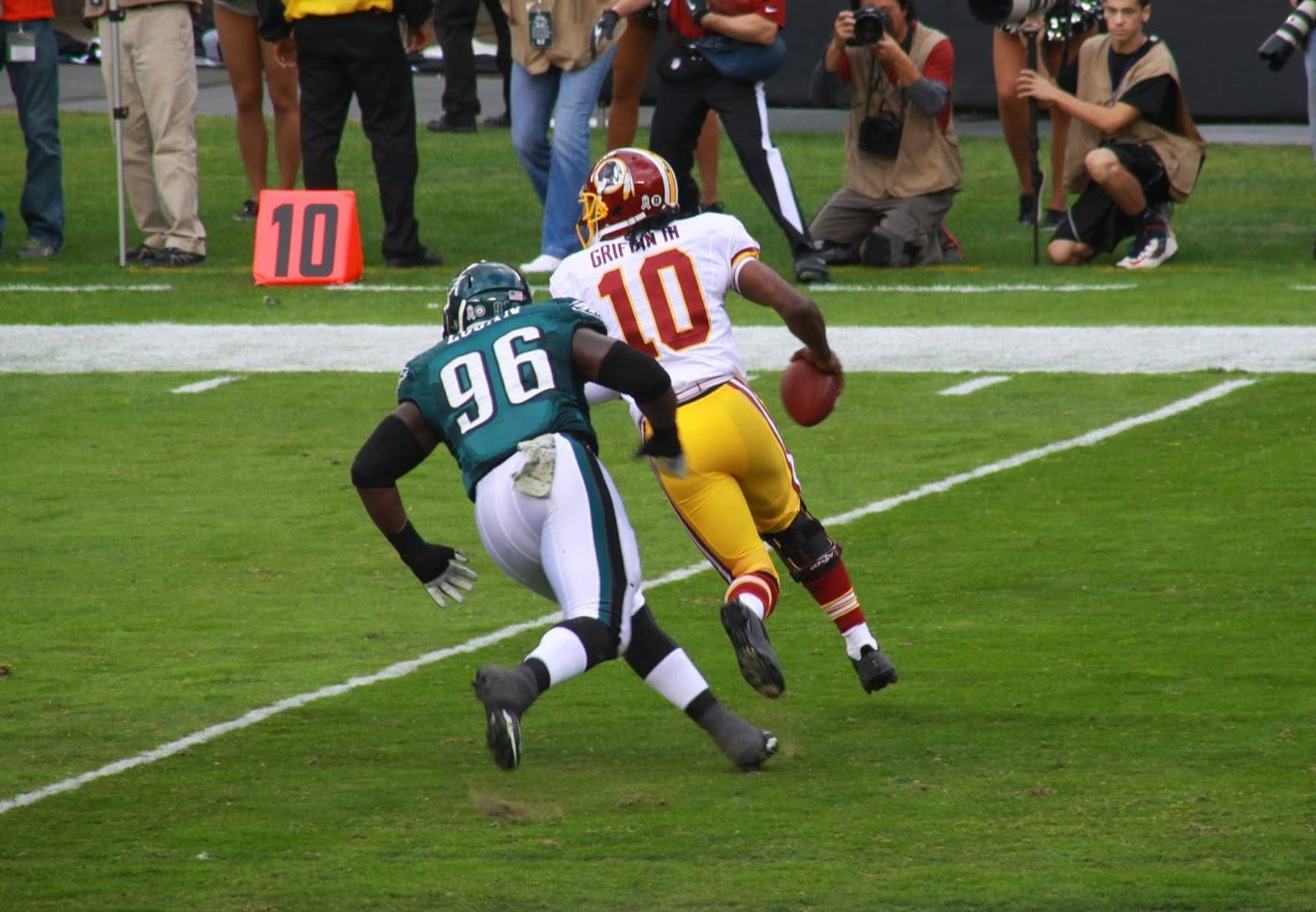
Logan pursues Redskins quarterback Robert Griffin III in 2013.

Logan was selected fifth in the third round of the 2013 NFL draft (67th overall) by the Philadelphia Eagles.

Logan played 16 games in 2013 and won the starting job 8 games into the season. Logan finished with 27 tackles, 2 sacks, 1 fumble recovery, 2 run stuffs, and a blocked kick.

Logan played and started all 16 games for the Eagles in 2014. Although he did not record a sack, he was recognized as a solid run stopper. He finished with 57 tackles, 1 pass defended, 1 forced fumble, and finished in the top 10 in the NFL in run stuffs, with 8.

2015 was considered a breakout year for Logan. Logan was praised by Eagles fans as a central part of their defense due to his effectiveness in stopping the run. Logan played and started the first 14 games before going down with a knee injury against the Arizona Cardinals. He finished with 55 tackles, 1 sack, and was tied for 8th in the NFL in run stuffs with 10.

In 2016, Logan played and started 13 games, totaling 24 tackles, 2.5 sacks, 5 run stuffs, 2 forced fumbles, 1 fumble recovery, and 2 blocked kicks.

=== Kansas City Chiefs ===
On March 13, 2017, Logan signed a one-year deal worth $8 million with the Kansas City Chiefs. He played in 15 games with 12 starts for the Chiefs in 2017, recording 52 tackles and 1.5 sacks.

=== Tennessee Titans ===
On April 8, 2018, Logan signed a one year, $4 million contract with the Tennessee Titans. Logan played in 15 games while starting none, finishing the 2018 season with 14 tackles and no sacks.

== NFL career statistics ==
Legend
**Bold**	Career high

=== Regular season ===
Year	Team	Games		Tackles					Interceptions					Fumbles			
Year	Team	GP	GS	Cmb	Solo	Ast	Sck	TFL	Int	Yds	TD	Lng	PD	FF	FR	Yds	TD
2013	PHI	**16**	8	27	20	7	2.0	5	0	0	0	0	**1**	0	**1**	0	0
2014	PHI	**16**	**16**	**58**	**46**	12	0.0	8	0	0	0	0	**1**	1	0	0	0
2015	PHI	14	14	55	39	16	1.0	**9**	0	0	0	0	0	0	0	0	0
2016	PHI	13	13	24	16	8	**2.5**	5	0	0	0	0	0	**2**	**1**	0	0
2017	KAN	15	12	52	35	**17**	1.5	**9**	0	0	0	0	**1**	0	0	0	0
2018	TEN	15	0	14	5	9	0.0	0	0	0	0	0	0	0	0	0	0
		89	63	230	161	69	7.0	36	0	0	0	0	3	3	2	0	0

=== Playoffs ===
Year	Team	Games		Tackles					Interceptions					Fumbles			
Year	Team	GP	GS	Cmb	Solo	Ast	Sck	TFL	Int	Yds	TD	Lng	PD	FF	FR	Yds	TD
2013	PHI	**1**	0	**4**	**4**	0	0.0	0	0	0	0	0	0	0	0	0	0
2017	KAN	**1**	**1**	1	0	**1**	0.0	0	0	0	0	0	0	0	0	0	0
		2	1	5	4	1	0.0	0	0	0	0	0	0	0	0	0	0
