= Crichton, Louisiana =

Crichton
- Unincorporated community
- Location within Louisiana Location within the United States
- Coordinates: 32°07′29″N 93°26′01″W
- Country: United States
- States: Louisiana
- Parish: Red River
- Elevation: 141 ft (43 m)
- Time zone: UTC-6 (Central (CST))
  - Summer (DST): UTC-5 (CDT)
- GNIS feature ID: 554128

Crichton (also Crichton Station) is an unincorporated community in Red River Parish, Louisiana, United States.
