= W. Scott Wilkinson =

American politician (1895–1985)

Member of the Louisiana House of Representatives
- In office 1920–1924

Personal details
- Born: William Scott Wilkinson; February 5, 1895 Coushatta, Louisiana, U.S.
- Died: June 19, 1985 (aged 90) Shreveport, Louisiana, U.S.
- Party: Democratic
- Education: Louisiana State University

William Scott Wilkinson (February 5, 1895 – June 19, 1985) was an American politician. A member of the Democratic Party, he served in the Louisiana House of Representatives from 1920 to 1924.

== Life and career ==
Wilkinson was born in Coushatta, Louisiana, the son of John Dallas Wilkinson and Alice Mai. He attended Louisiana State University, earning his B.A. degree in 1915. After earning his degree, he served in the United States Army during World War I, which after his discharge, he worked as a lawyer.

Wilkinson served in the Louisiana House of Representatives from 1920 to 1924.

== Death ==
Wilkinson died on June 19, 1985, at the Riverside Community Hospital in Shreveport, Louisiana, at the age of 90.
