= A. R. Johnson =

American politician

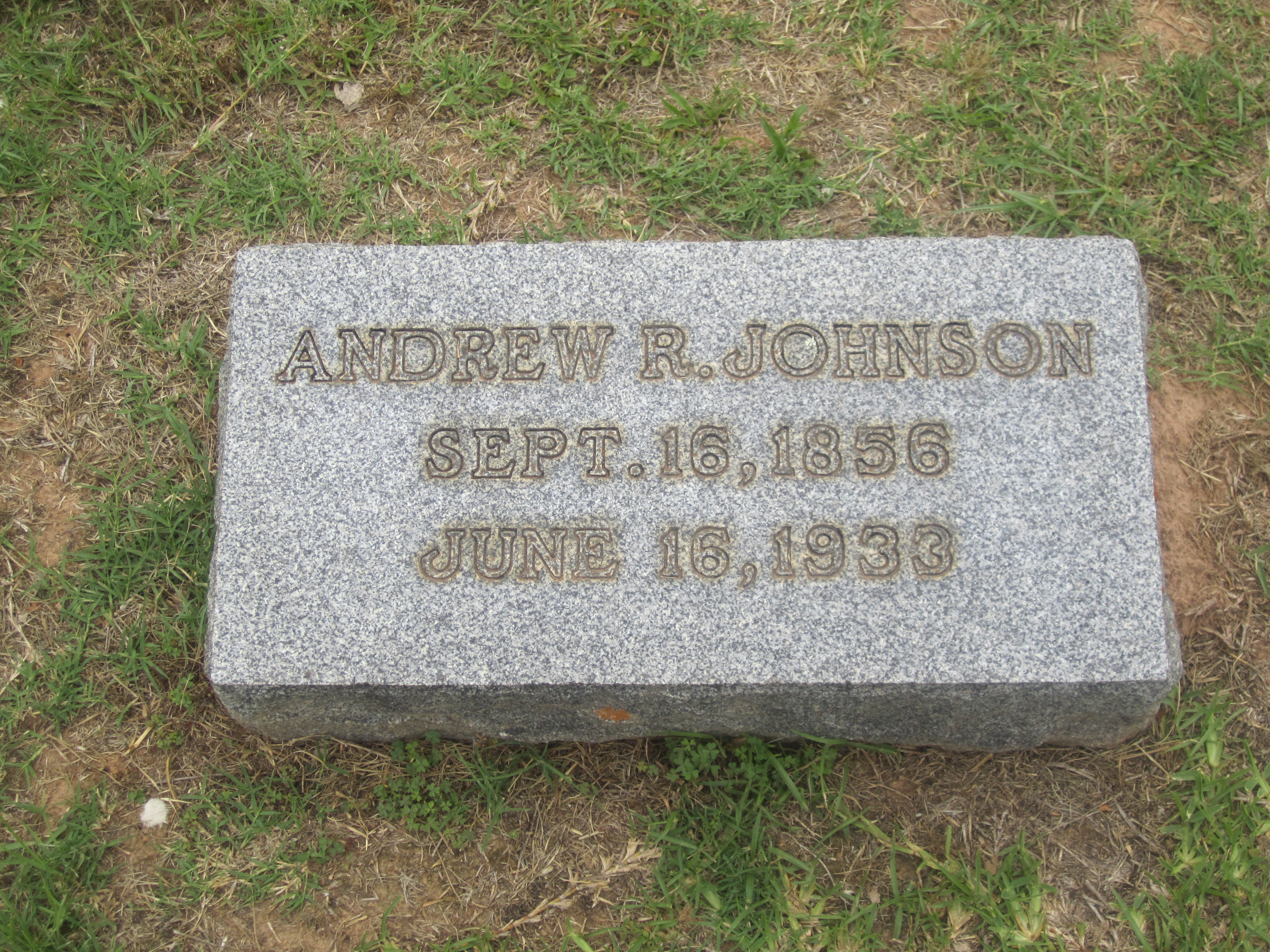
A. R. Johnson grave, Coushatta, Louisiana

Andrew Robinson Johnson (1856 – 1933) was an American politician. He served in the Louisiana Senate from 1916 to 1924. He was a Democrat and represented Claiborne Parish and Bienville Parish.
