= H. M. Fowler =

American politician (1918–2014)

Mayor of Coushatta, Louisiana
- In office 1951–1971
- Preceded by: Douglas Fowler
- Succeeded by: Elwood McWilliams

Member of the Louisiana House of Representatives from the 24th district
- In office 1972–1986 Serving with Joe Henry Cooper; Johnny McFerren
- Preceded by: John S. Pickett Jr.
- Succeeded by: Joe Reece Salter

Personal details
- Born: Hendrix Marion Fowler; February 13, 1918 Coushatta, Louisiana, U.S.
- Died: September 16, 2014 (aged 96)
- Party: Democratic
- Spouse: Katherine Josey
- Children: 2
- Education: Northwestern State University

Hendrix Marion Fowler (February 13, 1918 – September 16, 2014) was an American politician. He served as a Democratic member for the 24th district of the Louisiana House of Representatives.

Fowler was born in Coushatta, Louisiana, the son of Zula Fair and Angus Jesse Fowler. He was the brother of Douglas Fowler, who was Louisiana elections commissioner. He attended Martin High School and Northwestern State University, leaving to serve in the United States Army in World War II. After his discharge he built a house for his parents.

Fowler was the mayor of Coushatta, Louisiana from 1951 to 1971. where he succeeded his brother Douglas. The following year he was elected for the 24th district of the Louisiana House of Representatives, serving until 1986.

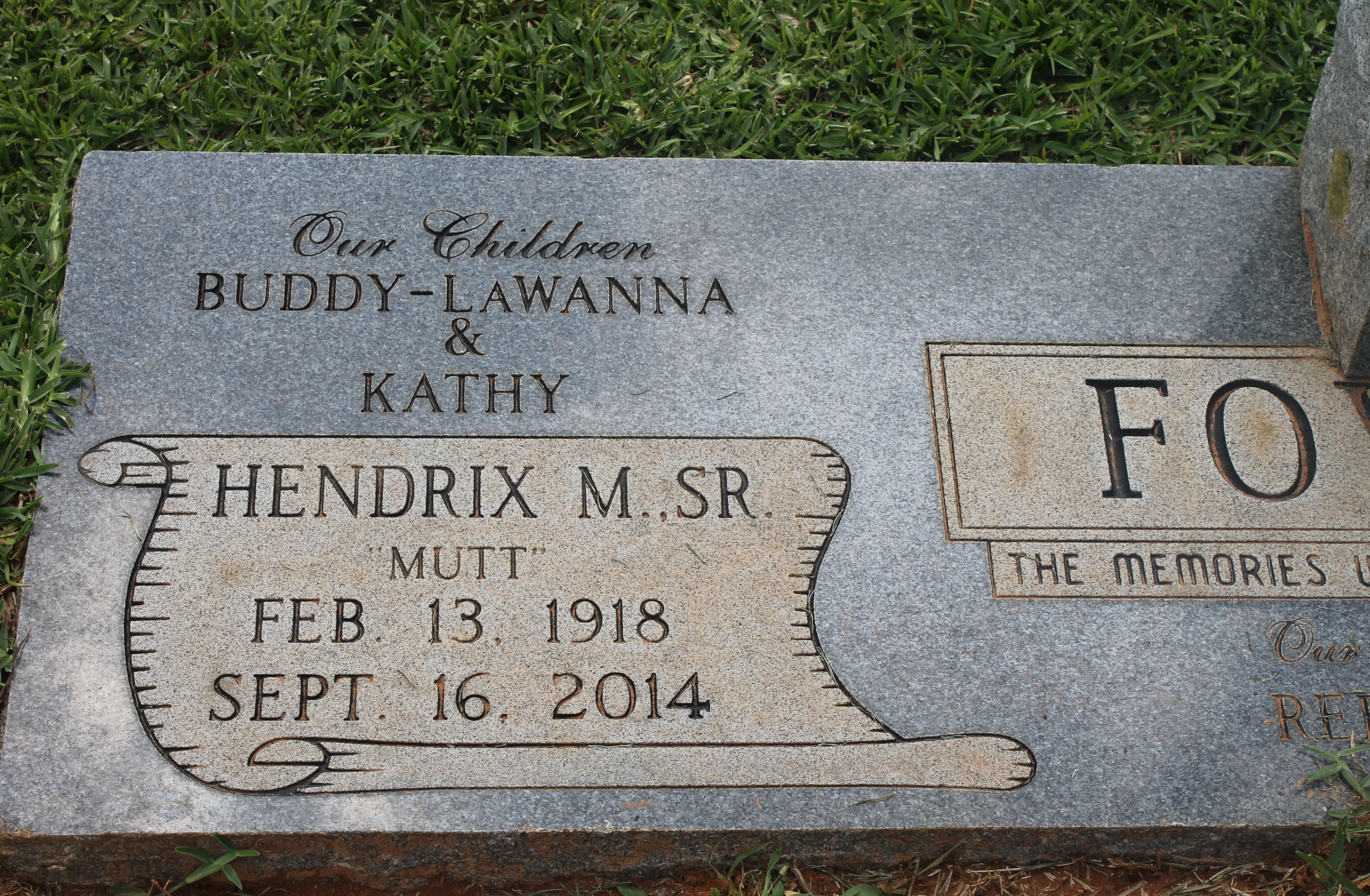
Fowler's gravestone at Springville Cemetery in 2015

Fowler died in September 2014, at the age of 96.
