= Red River Parish, Louisiana =

Parish in Louisiana, United States

Coordinates: 32.09°N 93.33°W

- Parish
- Parish of Red River; Paroisse de la Rivière-Rouge (French)
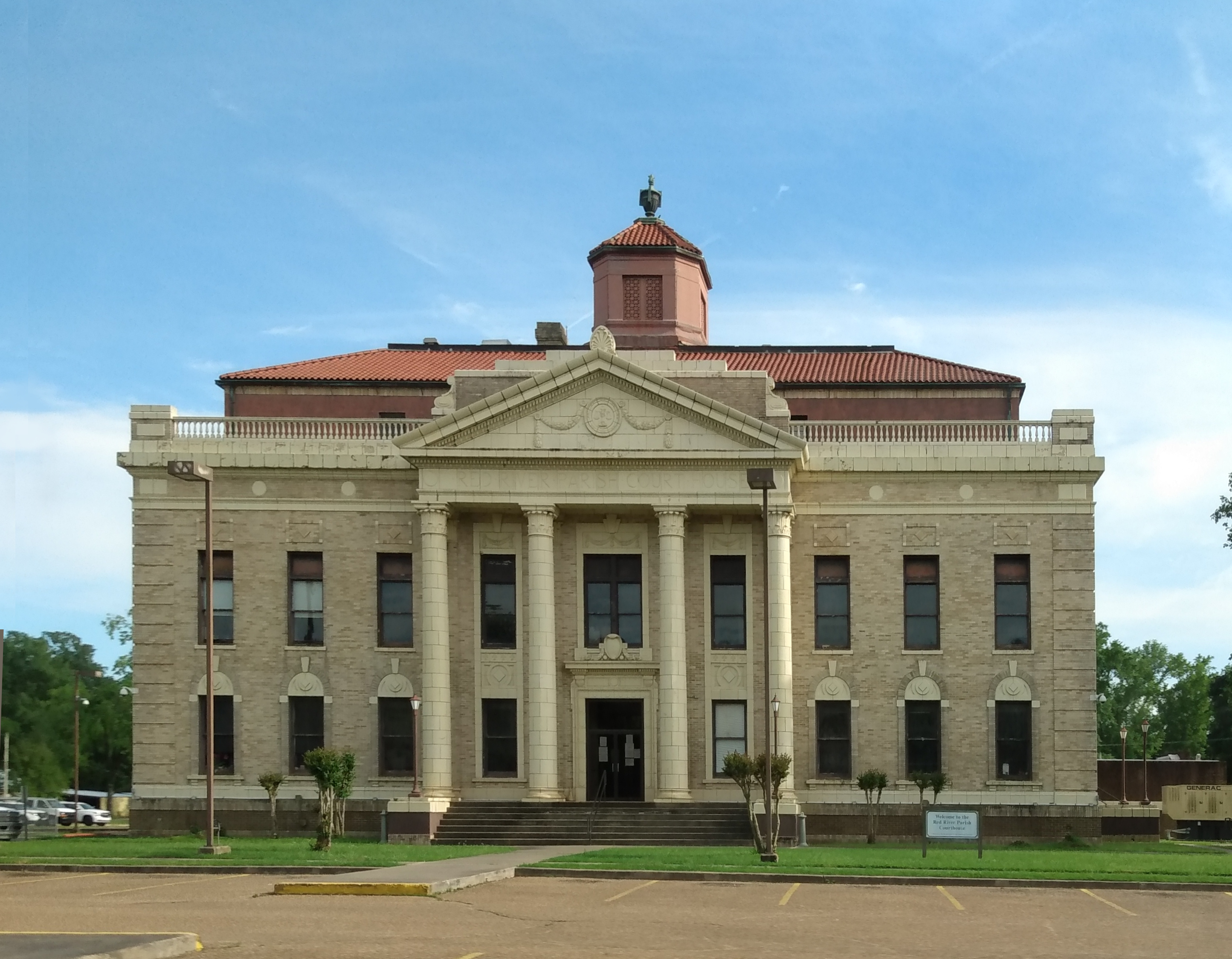
- Red River Parish Courthouse in Coushatta

- Seal

- Location within the U.S. state of Louisiana

- Louisiana's location within the U.S.
- Country: United States
- State: Louisiana
- Region: North Louisiana
- Founded: March 2, 1871; 155 years ago
- Named for: Red River
- Parish seat: Coushatta
- Largest municipality: Martin (area); Coushatta (population)
- Incorporated municipalities: 4 (total): 1 town and 3 villages; (located entirely or partially within parish boundaries)

Area
  - Total: 402 sq mi (1,040 km^{2})
  - Land: 389 sq mi (1,010 km^{2})
  - Water: 13 sq mi (34 km^{2})
  - percentage: 3.3 sq mi (8.5 km^{2})

Population (2020)
  - Total: 7,620
  - Estimate (2025): 7,165 ▼
  - Density: 19/sq mi (7.3/km^{2})
- Time zone: UTC-6 (CST)
  - Summer (DST): UTC-5 (CDT)
- Area code: 318
- Congressional district: 4th
- Website: Red River Parish Police Jury

Red River Parish (French: Paroisse de la Rivière-Rouge) is a parish located in the U.S. state of Louisiana. As of the 2020 census, the population was 7,620, making it the fourth-least populous parish in Louisiana. The parish seat and most populous municipality is Coushatta. It is one of the newer parishes, created in 1871 by the state legislature from parts of Bienville, Bossier, Caddo, Desoto and Natchitoches Parishes under Reconstruction. The plantation economy was based on cotton cultivation, highly dependent on enslaved African labor before the American Civil War.

In 1880, the parish had a population with more than twice as many black people as white people. They were essentially disenfranchised in 1898 under a new state constitution after the white Democrats regained power in the state in the late 1870s through paramilitary intimidation at the polls. Most of the former slaves worked as sharecroppers and laborers, cultivating cotton. Because of the mechanization of agriculture, many black people left the parish during the mid-20th century Great Migration to seek better job opportunities elsewhere. By 2000, the parish population was 9,622, with a white majority, but Coushatta itself was still two-thirds black.

== History ==
As in many other rural areas, Red River Parish and the Red River Valley were areas of white vigilante and paramilitary violence after the Civil War, as insurgents tried to regain power after the South's defeat. The state legislature during Reconstruction created the parish in 1871, one of a number established to develop Republican Party strength.

Marshall H. Twitchell was a Union veteran who moved to the parish from Vermont and married a local woman. With the help of her family, he became a successful cotton planter and local leader. He was elected in 1870 as a Republican to the state legislature and filled four local offices with his brother and three brothers-in-law, the latter native to the parish. He won support from freedmen by appointing some to local offices and promoting education.

During the 1870s, there were regular outbreaks of violence in Louisiana, despite the presence of two thousand federal troops stationed there. The extended agricultural depression and poor economy of the late 19th century aggravated social tensions, as both freedmen and whites struggled to survive and to manage new labor arrangements.

The disputed gubernatorial election of 1872 increased political tensions in the state, especially as the outcome was unsettled for months. Both the Democratic Party and Republican candidates certified their own slates of local officers. Established in May 1874 from white militias, the White League was formed first in the Red River Valley in nearby Grant Parish. The organization grew increasingly well-organized in rural areas like Red River Parish. Soon White League chapters rose across the state. Operating openly, the White League used violence against officeholders, running some out of town and killing others, and suppressed election turnout among black and white Republicans.

In August 1874 the White League forced six white Republicans from office in Coushatta and ordered them to leave the state. Members assassinated them before they left Louisiana. Four of the men murdered were the brother and three brothers-in-law of state Senator Marshall Twitchell. The White League also killed five to twenty freedmen who had accompanied the Twitchell relatives and were witnesses to the vigilante acts.

Historians came to call the events the Coushatta Massacre. The murders contributed to Republican Governor William Pitt Kellogg's request to President Grant for more Federal troops to help control the state. Ordinary Southerners wrote to President Grant at the White House describing the terrible conditions of violence and fear they lived under during these times.

With increased voter fraud, paramilitary violence against Republican blacks and whites, and intimidation at the polls preventing people from voting, white Democrats regained control of the state legislature in 1876. The population of the parish in 1880 was 8,573, of whom 2,506 were whites and 6,007 were blacks. In 1898 the state achieved disfranchisement of most blacks and many poor whites through a new constitution that created numerous barriers to voter registration.

=== 20th century ===
To seek better opportunities and escape the oppression of segregation, underfunded education, and disfranchisement, thousands of African Americans left Red River and other rural parishes in the Great Migration north and west. As may be seen in the census table below, most left from 1940 to 1970, when the parish had steep population decreases. Regional agricultural problems contributed to outmigration, especially after increasing mechanization in the 1930s reduced the need for laborers. At this time many African Americans from Louisiana went to California, where the defense industry associated with World War II was growing and workers were needed.

Additional outmigration from the parish occurred as late as the 1980s, when African Americans from Louisiana migrated within the South to jobs in developing metropolitan areas of New South states.

Red River Parish has been a Democratic Party stronghold since the party reestablished dominance in 1876. As in other southern states, recent decades have brought a realignment in politics in Presidential elections, with the conservative white majority of the parish voting for Republican U.S. President George W. Bush in his 2004 reelection. The majority of the parish voters, however, has continued to support Democratic candidates at the state and local level.

Red River was one of only three parishes that did not vote for the Republican gubernatorial candidate, U.S. Representative Bobby Jindal in the October 20, 2007, jungle primary. The others were nearby Bienville and St. Bernard, located southeast of New Orleans.

Despite its Democratic heritage, Red River Parish is represented in the Louisiana State Senate by a Republican, Gerald Long, the only member of the Long dynasty not to have been elected to office as a Democrat. Long defeated the Democratic candidate, Thomas Taylor Townsend, in the 2007 nonpartisan jungle primary. Both candidates came from Natchitoches.

Louisiana was the last state to issue same-sex marriage licenses in 2015 after a landmark Supreme Court decision to allow same-sex marriage in all 50 U.S. states. Red River Parish was the final holdout of Louisiana's 64 parishes when it continued to deny marriage licenses after 63 other parishes began doing so in late June 2015. Parish Clerk of Court Stuart Shaw was the only official besides Governor Bobby Jindal to continue to defy the Supreme Court's ruling even after the Clerks of Court Association reversed their "wait and see" position.

== Geography ==
According to the U.S. Census Bureau, the parish has a total area of 402 square miles (1,040 km^{2}), of which 389 square miles (1,010 km^{2}) is land and 13 square miles (34 km^{2}) (3.3%) is water.

=== Major highways ===
==== U.S. highways ====
- U.S. Highway 71
- U.S. Highway 84
- U.S. Highway 371

==== State highways ====
- Louisiana Highway 1
- Louisiana Highway 155
- Louisiana Highway 174
- Louisiana Highway 177
- Louisiana Highway 480
- Louisiana Highway 507
- Louisiana Highway 509
- Louisiana Highway 514
- Louisiana Highway 515
- Louisiana Highway 783
- Louisiana Highway 784
- Louisiana Highway 786
- Louisiana Highway 787
- Louisiana Highway 788

=== Adjacent parishes ===
- Caddo Parish (northwest)
- Bossier Parish (north)
- Bienville Parish (northeast)
- Natchitoches Parish (southeast)
- De Soto Parish (west)

=== National protected area ===
- Red River National Wildlife Refuge (part)

=== Climate ===
According to the Köppen Climate Classification system, Red River Parish has a humid subtropical climate, abbreviated "Cfa" on climate maps. The hottest temperature recorded in Red River Parish was 108 °F (42.2 °C) on August 3, 1998, September 4, 2000, and August 19, 2011, while the coldest temperature recorded was 3 °F (−16.1 °C) on December 23, 1989.

Climate data for Red River, Louisiana, 1991–2020 normals, extremes 1969–present
Month	Jan	Feb	Mar	Apr	May	Jun	Jul	Aug	Sep	Oct	Nov	Dec	Year
Record high °F (°C)	81 (27)	87 (31)	90 (32)	95 (35)	99 (37)	103 (39)	105 (41)	108 (42)	108 (42)	97 (36)	88 (31)	83 (28)	108 (42)
Mean maximum °F (°C)	75.2 (24.0)	78.1 (25.6)	83.8 (28.8)	88.0 (31.1)	92.5 (33.6)	96.3 (35.7)	99.1 (37.3)	100.1 (37.8)	97.5 (36.4)	91.1 (32.8)	83.0 (28.3)	77.0 (25.0)	101.7 (38.7)
Mean daily maximum °F (°C)	56.7 (13.7)	61.0 (16.1)	68.9 (20.5)	76.5 (24.7)	83.8 (28.8)	90.2 (32.3)	93.2 (34.0)	93.9 (34.4)	88.9 (31.6)	79.1 (26.2)	67.4 (19.7)	58.9 (14.9)	76.5 (24.7)
Daily mean °F (°C)	46.4 (8.0)	50.3 (10.2)	57.8 (14.3)	65.2 (18.4)	73.6 (23.1)	80.5 (26.9)	83.3 (28.5)	83.1 (28.4)	77.2 (25.1)	66.5 (19.2)	56.0 (13.3)	48.4 (9.1)	65.7 (18.7)
Mean daily minimum °F (°C)	36.0 (2.2)	39.5 (4.2)	46.6 (8.1)	53.9 (12.2)	63.3 (17.4)	70.9 (21.6)	73.4 (23.0)	72.2 (22.3)	65.5 (18.6)	53.9 (12.2)	44.7 (7.1)	38.0 (3.3)	54.8 (12.7)
Mean minimum °F (°C)	21.7 (−5.7)	26.7 (−2.9)	30.9 (−0.6)	38.7 (3.7)	49.7 (9.8)	62.2 (16.8)	67.4 (19.7)	64.7 (18.2)	52.4 (11.3)	39.0 (3.9)	29.2 (−1.6)	25.1 (−3.8)	20.1 (−6.6)
Record low °F (°C)	6 (−14)	13 (−11)	18 (−8)	29 (−2)	41 (5)	51 (11)	59 (15)	50 (10)	42 (6)	28 (−2)	18 (−8)	3 (−16)	3 (−16)
Average precipitation inches (mm)	4.88 (124)	4.43 (113)	5.07 (129)	5.56 (141)	4.54 (115)	4.23 (107)	3.41 (87)	3.28 (83)	3.46 (88)	4.54 (115)	4.03 (102)	5.00 (127)	52.43 (1,331)
Average snowfall inches (cm)	0.1 (0.25)	0.1 (0.25)	0.0 (0.0)	0.0 (0.0)	0.0 (0.0)	0.0 (0.0)	0.0 (0.0)	0.0 (0.0)	0.0 (0.0)	0.0 (0.0)	0.0 (0.0)	0.0 (0.0)	0.2 (0.5)
Average precipitation days (≥ 0.01 in)	9.7	9.6	9.7	7.8	8.5	8.4	7.7	6.7	6.4	7.4	8.4	9.8	100.1
Average snowy days (≥ 0.1 in)	0.1	0.1	0.0	0.0	0.0	0.0	0.0	0.0	0.0	0.0	0.0	0.0	0.2
Source 1: NOAA
Source 2: National Weather Service

== Communities ==
=== Town ===
- Coushatta (parish seat and most populous municipality)

=== Villages ===
- Edgefield (smallest municipality)
- Hall Summit
- Martin (largest municipality by land area)

=== Unincorporated communities ===
- Crichton
- East Point
- Fairview Alpha
- Grand Bayou
- Hanna
- Harmon
- Lake End

== Demographics ==
Historical population
Census	Pop.	Note	%±
1880	8,573		—
1890	11,318		32.0%
1900	11,548		2.0%
1910	11,402		−1.3%
1920	15,301		34.2%
1930	16,078		5.1%
1940	15,881		−1.2%
1950	12,113		−23.7%
1960	9,978		−17.6%
1970	9,226		−7.5%
1980	10,433		13.1%
1990	9,387		−10.0%
2000	9,622		2.5%
2010	9,091		−5.5%
2020	7,620		−16.2%
2025 (est.)	7,165	▼	−6.0%
U.S. Decennial Census; 1790-1960 1900-1990; 1990-2000 2010

=== 2020 census ===
As of the 2020 census, the parish had a population of 7,620. The median age was 40.5 years; 25.0% of residents were under the age of 18 and 19.2% of residents were 65 years of age or older. For every 100 females there were 91.8 males, and for every 100 females age 18 and over there were 86.8 males age 18 and over.

There were 3,042 households and 1,984 families residing in the parish; 31.7% of households had children under the age of 18 living in them, 40.6% were married-couple households, 19.8% were households with a male householder and no spouse or partner present, and 34.5% were households with a female householder and no spouse or partner present. About 30.4% of all households were made up of individuals and 14.1% had someone living alone who was 65 years of age or older.

There were 3,567 housing units, of which 14.7% were vacant. Among occupied housing units, 73.8% were owner-occupied and 26.2% were renter-occupied. The homeowner vacancy rate was 1.4% and the rental vacancy rate was 5.7%.

The racial makeup of the parish was 55.1% White, 38.9% Black or African American, 0.6% American Indian and Alaska Native, <0.1% Asian, <0.1% Native Hawaiian and Pacific Islander, 0.9% from some other race, and 4.5% from two or more races. Hispanic or Latino residents of any race comprised 2.5% of the population.

<0.1% of residents lived in urban areas, while 100.0% lived in rural areas.

=== Racial and ethnic composition ===
Red River Parish, Louisiana – Racial and ethnic composition Note: the US Census treats Hispanic/Latino as an ethnic category. This table excludes Latinos from the racial categories and assigns them to a separate category. Hispanics/Latinos may be of any race.
Race / Ethnicity (NH = Non-Hispanic)	Pop 1980	Pop 1990	Pop 2000	Pop 2010	Pop 2020	% 1980	% 1990	% 2000	% 2010	% 2020
White alone (NH)	6,556	5,720	5,540	5,305	4,150	62.84%	60.94%	57.58%	58.35%	54.46%
Black or African American alone (NH)	3,719	3,583	3,899	3,586	2,952	35.65%	38.17%	40.52%	39.45%	38.74%
Native American or Alaska Native alone (NH)	13	17	27	33	41	0.12%	0.18%	0.28%	0.36%	0.54%
Asian alone (NH)	3	6	9	12	0	0.03%	0.06%	0.09%	0.13%	0.00%
Native Hawaiian or Pacific Islander alone (NH)	x	x	0	1	0	x	x	0.00%	0.01%	0.00%
Other race alone (NH)	5	0	1	3	20	0.05%	0.00%	0.01%	0.03%	0.26%
Mixed race or Multiracial (NH)	x	x	49	50	269	x	x	0.51%	0.55%	3.53%
Hispanic or Latino (any race)	137	61	97	101	188	1.31%	0.65%	1.01%	1.11%	2.47%
Total	10,433	9,387	9,622	9,091	7,620	100.00%	100.00%	100.00%	100.00%	100.00%

=== 2000 census ===
As of the census of 2000, there were 9,622 people, 3,414 households, and 2,526 families living in the parish. The population density was 25 inhabitants per square mile (9.7/km^{2}). There were 3,988 housing units at an average density of 10 per square mile (3.9/km^{2}). The racial makeup of the parish was 57.87% White, 40.91% Black or African American, 0.28% Native American, 0.09% Asian, 0.02% Pacific Islander, 0.22% from other races, and 0.61% from two or more races; 1.01% of the population were Hispanic or Latino of any race.

In 2000, were 3,414 households, out of which 35.70% had children under the age of 18 living with them, 51.50% were married couples living together, 18.60% had a female householder with no husband present, and 26.00% were non-families. Individuals made up 23.10% of all households, and 11.50% had someone living alone who was 65 years of age or older. The average household size was 2.74 and the average family size was 3.23.

In the parish the population was spread out, with 30.10% under the age of 18, 9.30% from 18 to 24, 24.80% from 25 to 44, 21.50% from 45 to 64, and 14.40% who were 65 years of age or older. As of 2000, the median age was 35 years. For every 100 females there were 90.80 males. For every 100 females age 18 and over, there were 85.40 males.

According to the 2000 census, the median income for a household in the parish was $23,153, and the median income for a family was $27,870. Males had a median income of $27,132 versus $17,760 for females. The per capita income for the parish was $12,119. About 26.00% of families and 29.90% of the population were below the poverty line, including 40.10% of those under age 18 and 18.90% of those age 65 or over.

== Education ==
Public schools in Red River Parish are operated by the Red River Parish School District.

It is in the service area of Bossier Parish Community College.

== Government ==
Red River Parish is governed by the Red River Parish Police Jury, which is divided into seven districts. District 1 is represented by William Brown, District 2 by Brandon Hillman, District 3 by Shawn Beard, District 4 by Jessie Davis, District 5 by John W. Moore, District 6 by Ben Taylor, and District 7 by Tray Murray. Red River Parish is represented in the Louisiana State Senate by Republican Louie Bernard of District 31. In the Louisiana House of Representatives, the parish is represented by Republican Michael Firment of District 22 and Democrat Kenny R. Cox of District 23. In the United States House of Representatives, it is represented by Republican Mike Johnson of Louisiana's 4th congressional district.

== National Guard ==
Coushatta is the home of C Troop 2-108th Cavalry Squadron, a unit dating back to the Confederate Army during the Civil War under the nickname "the Wildbunch". This unit was formerly known as A Company 1-156 Armor Battalion and served recently in Iraq during 2004-5 under the 256th Infantry Brigade. This unit returned from its second deployment to Iraq in 2010.

== Hospital ==
Christus Coushatta Health Care Center is the only hospital in Red River Parish.

== Prison ==
Name	Address	Zip	Aged
Red River Parish Detention Center	E. Carroll Street, Coushatta, Louisiana	71019	18+

== Notable people ==
- Jean Baptiste Brevelle (1698–1754), early 18th century explorer, trader and soldier of Fort Saint Jean Baptiste des Natchitoches and Le Poste des Cadodaquious, the first European settlement in the area.
- Andrew R. Johnson, former state senator (1916–1924) and mayor of Homer in Claiborne Parish, is interred in Red River Parish at Springville Cemetery in Coushatta.
- Lloyd F. Wheat, attorney and member of the Louisiana State Senate from Red River and Natchitoches parishes from 1948 to 1952

== Politics ==
United States presidential election results for Red River Parish, Louisiana
Year	Republican		Democratic		Third party(ies)	
Year	No.	%	No.	%	No.	%
1912	6	1.29%	357	76.61%	103	22.10%
1916	4	0.70%	567	99.30%	0	0.00%
1920	187	19.62%	766	80.38%	0	0.00%
1924	34	5.26%	579	89.49%	34	5.26%
1928	317	26.00%	891	73.09%	11	0.90%
1932	24	1.42%	1,661	98.34%	4	0.24%
1936	132	7.45%	1,641	92.55%	0	0.00%
1940	231	10.88%	1,892	89.12%	0	0.00%
1944	409	29.55%	975	70.45%	0	0.00%
1948	113	5.37%	452	21.46%	1,541	73.17%
1952	774	29.82%	1,822	70.18%	0	0.00%
1956	661	36.97%	803	44.91%	324	18.12%
1960	406	21.18%	377	19.67%	1,134	59.15%
1964	2,235	87.00%	334	13.00%	0	0.00%
1968	380	10.08%	914	24.24%	2,477	65.69%
1972	2,245	65.95%	957	28.11%	202	5.93%
1976	1,728	46.61%	1,906	51.42%	73	1.97%
1980	2,147	43.06%	2,776	55.68%	63	1.26%
1984	3,060	60.39%	1,958	38.64%	49	0.97%
1988	2,266	49.41%	2,254	49.15%	66	1.44%
1992	1,649	35.24%	2,360	50.43%	671	14.34%
1996	1,344	31.28%	2,641	61.48%	311	7.24%
2000	2,200	48.65%	2,177	48.14%	145	3.21%
2004	2,507	53.15%	2,140	45.37%	70	1.48%
2008	2,484	53.66%	2,080	44.93%	65	1.40%
2012	2,483	51.65%	2,253	46.87%	71	1.48%
2016	2,391	54.07%	1,938	43.83%	93	2.10%
2020	2,413	58.40%	1,644	39.79%	75	1.82%
2024	2,337	62.74%	1,321	35.46%	67	1.80%

== See also ==
- National Register of Historic Places listings in Red River Parish, Louisiana
