= Red River Senior High School =

Public high school in Coushatta, Louisiana, United States

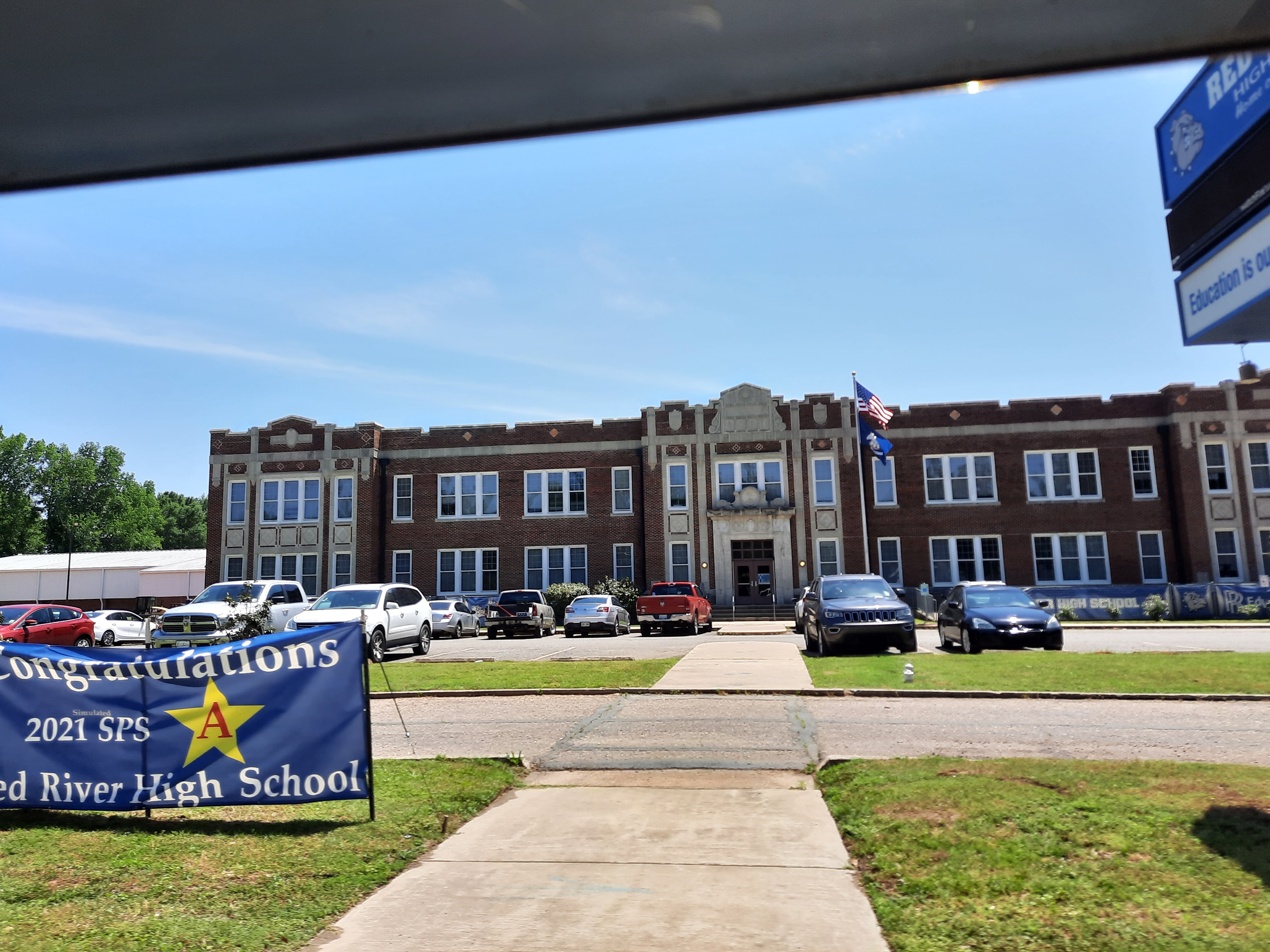

Location
- 915 East Carroll Street; Coushatta, (Red River Parish), Louisiana 71019; United States
- Coordinates: 32.0153°N 93.3354°W

Information
- Type: Public high school
- School district: Red River Parish School Board
- Principal: Norman Picou
- Staff: 35.45 (FTE)
- Enrollment: 349 (2024–2025)
- Student to teacher ratio: 9.84
- Colors: Blue and silver
- Mascot: Bulldogs

Red River Senior High School is a public, secondary school in Coushatta, Louisiana, United States. It is part of the Red River Parish School District and serves students in grades nine through twelve. The school's mascot is the Bulldog.

Formerly known as Coushatta High School, Red River Senior High is located at 915 East Carroll Street on a shared campus with the district's junior high school.

== Athletics ==
Red River Senior High athletics competes in the LHSAA.

== Notable alumni ==
- Bennie Logan, NFL player
