= Riverdale Academy (Louisiana) =

Location
- Louisiana Highway 515; Ark-La-Tex; Coushatta, Red River Parish, Louisiana, Louisiana 71019; 32.163935°N 93.4302159°W

Information
- School type: Private
- Opened: Fall 1970
- Principal: Dr. Hunter Brown
- Grades: Pre-K-12
- Gender: Any
- Enrolment: 247
- Average class size: 18
- Fight song: Raging Rebels
- Sports: football, basketball, baseball, softball, track, golf, cheer, danceline
- Mascot: Rebel
- Accreditation: Mississippi Association of Independent Schools

Riverdale Academy is a private school in East Point, Louisiana, United States. Located outside Coushatta, Riverdale is the only private K-12 school in Red River Parish.

The main building of Riverdale Academy was built in the 1920s as East Point School, a public K-8 school. In response to a desegregation order resulting from a 1966 court case (U.S. v. Red River Parish School Board, C.A. No. 12169, W.D. La., filed July, 1966) and population loss, numerous schools in Red River Parish had been consolidated or closed by 1970. East Point School was sold for $501.50 on January 8, 1970, to Florane House Movers, which then turned over the property to a parents group to form a new segregation academy.

The school opened in the fall of 1970 as a segregation academy. Its mascot is the Raging Rebels .

== State support ==
Riverdale, like other private schools in Louisiana, gets state support in the form of tax deductions for tuition, tuition grants for low income children, buses, and lunches. Louisiana provides transportation of students to all schools public and private, as long as the school does not have discriminatory policies.

== See also ==
- List of high schools in Louisiana
- List of school districts in Louisiana
- Red River Parish School District
