= East Point, Louisiana =

Unincorporated community in Louisiana, US

East Point
- Unincorporated community
- Hamlet of East Point
- Location within Louisiana Location within the United States
- Coordinates: 32°09′56″N 93°25′53″W
- Country: United States
- State: Louisiana
- Parish: Red River
- Elevation: 144 ft (44 m)

East Point is an unincorporated community in Red River Parish, Louisiana, United States.

The private K-12 school, Riverdale Academy (established 1970), is located in East Point.
