= Coushatta, Louisiana =

- Town
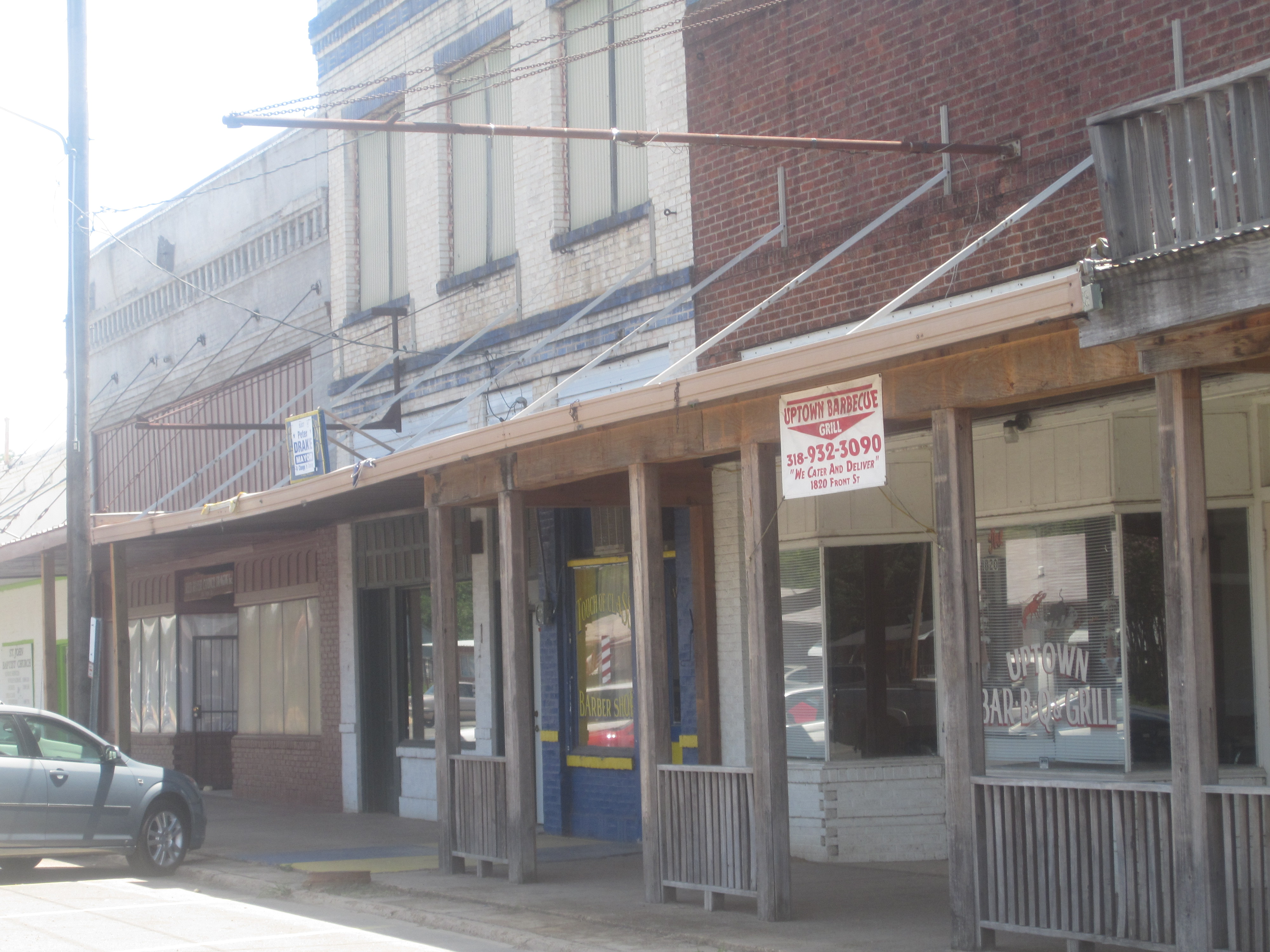
- Downtown Coushatta

- Location of Coushatta in Red River Parish, Louisiana.

- Location of Louisiana in the contiguous United States
- Coordinates: 32°01′23″N 93°20′30″W
- Country: United States
- State: Louisiana
- Parish: Red River

Government
  - Mayor: Ashanti Cole (I)

Area
  - Total: 3.44 sq mi (8.90 km^{2})
  - Land: 3.34 sq mi (8.65 km^{2})
  - Water: 0.097 sq mi (0.25 km^{2})
- Elevation: 141 ft (43 m)

Population (2020)
  - Total: 1,752
  - Density: 524.5/sq mi (202.52/km^{2})
- Time zone: UTC-6 (CST)
  - Summer (DST): UTC-5 (CDT)
- Zip Code: 71019
- Area code: 318
- FIPS code: 22-18055
- Website: townofcoushatta.com

Coushatta is a town in, and the parish seat of, rural Red River Parish in north Louisiana, United States. It is situated on the east bank of the Red River. The community is approximately 45 miles south of Shreveport on U.S. Highway 71. The population, 2,299 at the 2000 census, is nearly two-thirds African American, most with long family histories in the area. The 2010 census, however, reported 1,964 residents, a decline of 335 persons, or nearly 15 percent during the course of the preceding decade. In 2020, its population was 1,752. The city is named after the Coushatta, a Native American nation indigenous to the region.

== History ==
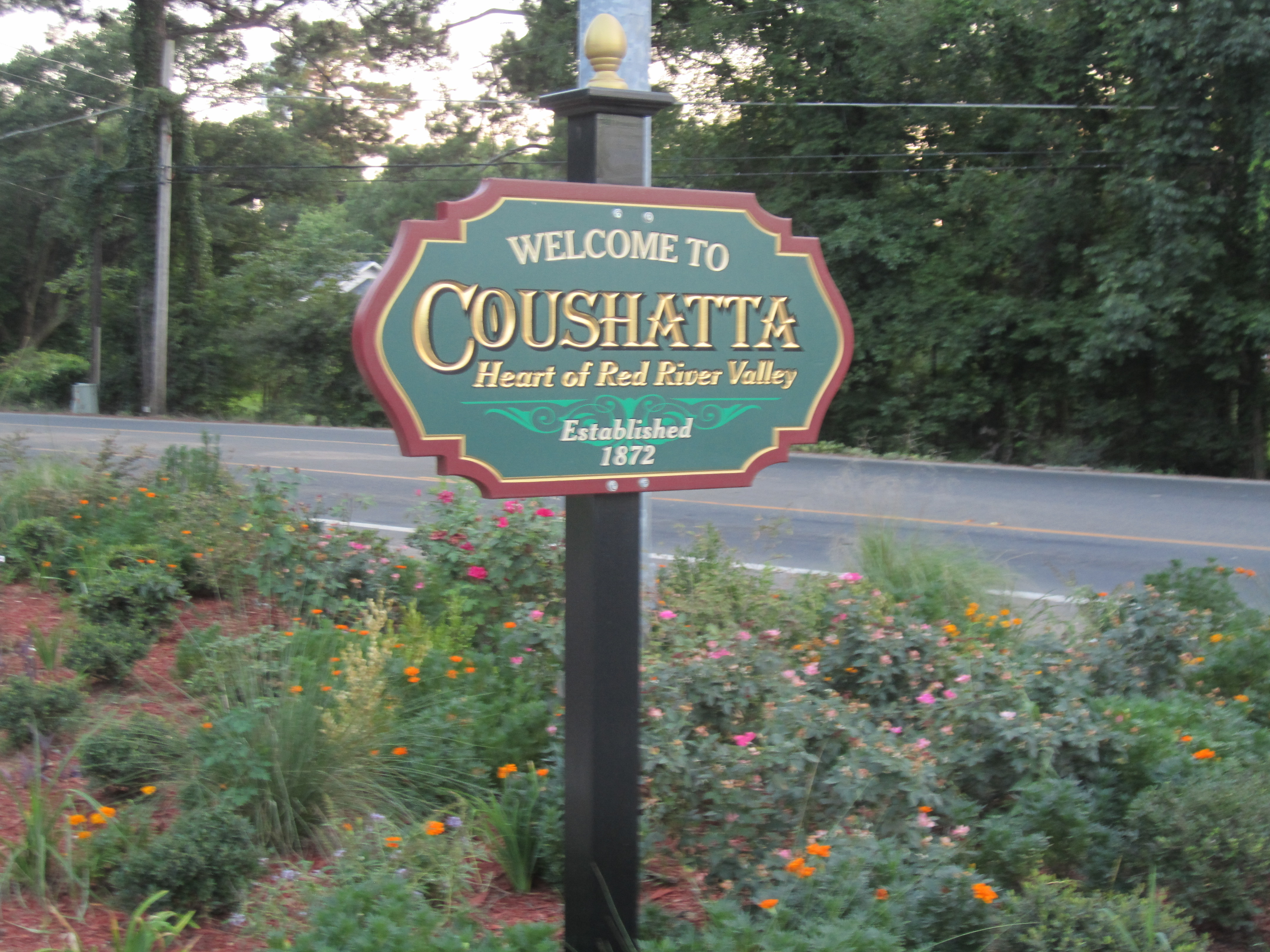
Welcome sign

Red River Parish and the Red River Valley were areas of unrest and white paramilitary activity and violence after the Civil War, and especially during the 1870s of Reconstruction. The parish developed around cotton cultivation and enslaved African Americans who far outnumbered the whites. After the war, white planters and farmers tried to reestablish dominance over a majority of the population. With emancipation and being granted citizenship and suffrage, African Americans tried to create their own lives.

Formed in May 1874 from white militias, the White League in Louisiana was increasingly well-organized in rural areas like Red River Parish. It worked to turn out the Democratic Party, as well as suppress freedmen's civil rights and voting rights. It used violence against officeholders, running some out of town and killing others, and acted near elections to suppress black and white Republican voter turnout.

In one of the more flagrant examples of violence, the White League in August 1874 captured six Republican officials in Coushatta, made them sign a pledge to leave the state, and escorted them when they were assassinated on their departure from the state. Victims included the brother and three brothers-in-law of the Republican State Senator Marshall H. Twitchell. Twitchell's wife and her brothers were from a family with long ties in Red River Parish. One of Twitchell's several biographies is an unpublished 1969 dissertation at Mississippi State University in Starkville by the historian Jimmy G. Shoalmire, a Shreveport native and a specialist in Reconstruction studies.

The White League also killed five to twenty freedmen who had been escorting the Republicans and were witnesses to the assassinations. The events became known as the Coushatta Massacre and contributed to the Republican governor's requesting more federal troops from president Ulysses S. Grant to help control the state. Ordinary Southerners wrote to the White House describing the terrible conditions and fear they lived under during these years.

With increased fraud, violence and intimidation, white Redeemer Democrats gained control of the state legislature in 1876 and established a new system of one-party rule. They passed laws making elections more complicated and a new constitution with provisions that effectively disenfranchised most African Americans and many poorer whites. This disenfranchisement persisted for decades into the 20th century before passage of civil rights legislation and the Voting Rights Act of 1965.

After World War II, Dr. Lawrence Edward L'Herisson Sr., a native of Bossier Parish, built a 23-bed regional rural hospital in Coushatta. He subsequently relocated to Shreveport. Coushatta is now served by the 25-bed Christus Coushatta Health Care Center.

== Geography ==
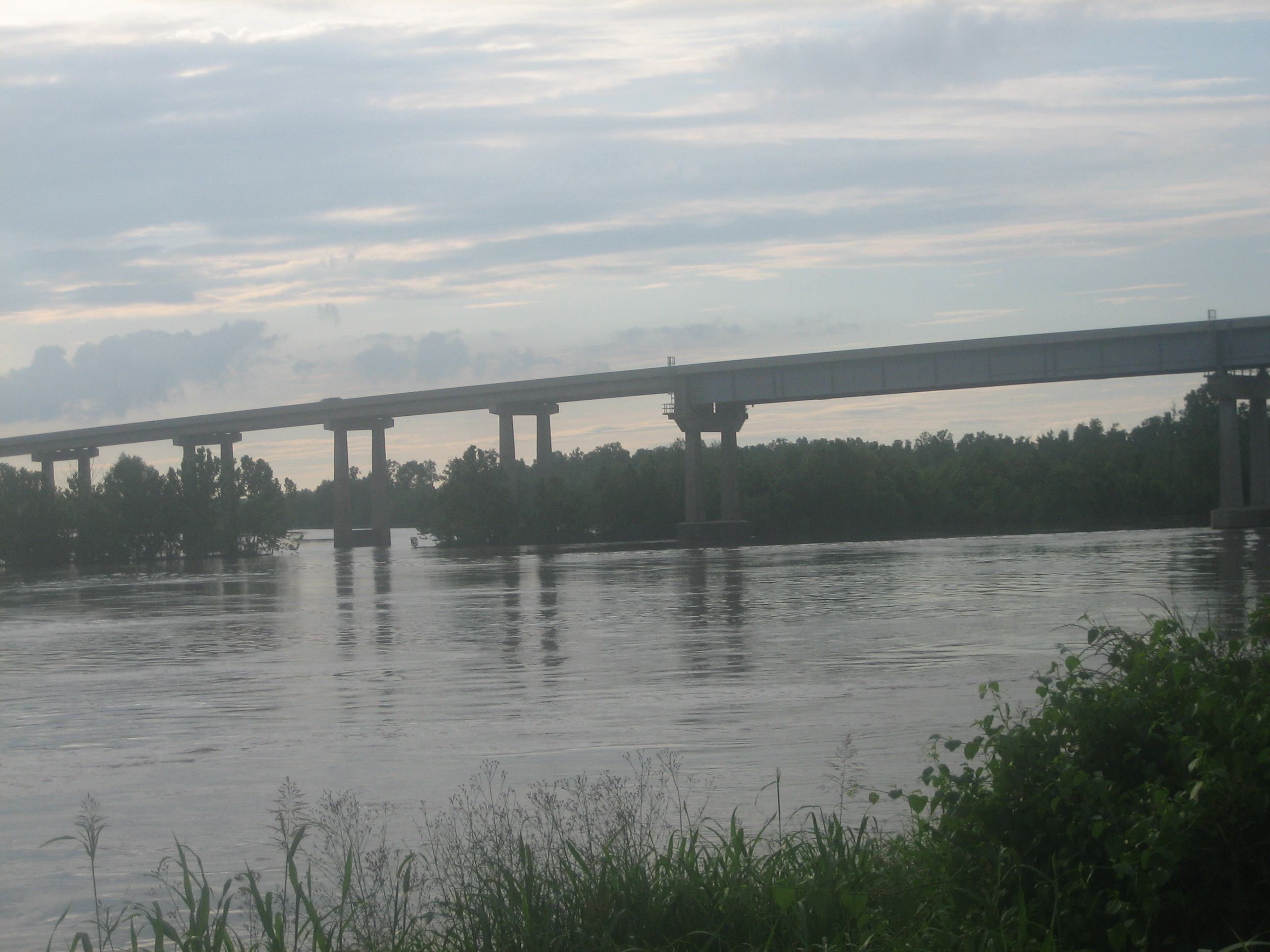
The Red River at Coushatta

According to the United States Census Bureau, the town has a total area of 3.4 square miles (8.8 km^{2}), of which 3.3 square miles (8.5 km^{2}) is land and 0.1 square miles (0.26 km^{2}) (2.91%) is water.

North of Coushatta, Loggy Bayou, which flows from Lake Bistineau, joins the Red River.

=== Climate ===
This climatic region is typified by relatively small seasonal temperature variations, with warm to hot (and often humid) summers and mild winters. According to the Köppen Climate Classification system, Coushatta has a humid subtropical climate, abbreviated "Cfa" on climate maps.

Climate data for Coushatta, Louisiana
Month	Jan	Feb	Mar	Apr	May	Jun	Jul	Aug	Sep	Oct	Nov	Dec	Year
Mean daily maximum °F (°C)	61 (16)	64 (18)	71 (22)	77 (25)	84 (29)	89 (32)	91 (33)	91 (33)	88 (31)	80 (27)	71 (22)	63 (17)	78 (26)
Mean daily minimum °F (°C)	41 (5)	44 (7)	51 (11)	57 (14)	66 (19)	72 (22)	74 (23)	74 (23)	69 (21)	59 (15)	50 (10)	43 (6)	58 (14)
Average precipitation inches (mm)	5.5 (140)	3.3 (84)	3.5 (89)	3.6 (91)	6.1 (150)	6.1 (150)	5.1 (130)	4.8 (120)	6 (150)	3.9 (99)	4.6 (120)	4.6 (120)	57.2 (1,450)
Source: Weatherbase

== Demographics ==
Historical population
Census	Pop.	Note	%±
1880	488		—
1890	619		26.8%
1900	600		−3.1%
1910	564		−6.0%
1920	962		70.6%
1930	959		−0.3%
1940	1,289		34.4%
1950	1,788		38.7%
1960	1,663		−7.0%
1970	1,492		−10.3%
1980	2,084		39.7%
1990	1,845		−11.5%
2000	2,299		24.6%
2010	1,964		−14.6%
2020	1,752		−10.8%
2025 (est.)	1,623	▼	−7.4%
U.S. Decennial Census

=== 2020 census ===
As of the 2020 census, Coushatta had a population of 1,752. The median age was 39.4 years. 26.9% of residents were under the age of 18 and 18.8% were 65 years of age or older. For every 100 females there were 86.4 males, and for every 100 females age 18 and over there were 78.4 males age 18 and over.

0.0% of residents lived in urban areas, while 100.0% lived in rural areas.

There were 652 households in Coushatta, of which 35.4% had children under the age of 18 living in them. Of all households, 23.8% were married-couple households, 22.9% were households with a male householder and no spouse or partner present, and 48.5% were households with a female householder and no spouse or partner present. About 36.2% of all households were made up of individuals and 14.4% had someone living alone who was 65 years of age or older.

There were 706 housing units, of which 7.6% were vacant. The homeowner vacancy rate was 2.0% and the rental vacancy rate was 4.6%.

Coushatta racial composition as of 2020
Race	Number	Percentage
White (non-Hispanic)	465	26.54%
Black or African American (non-Hispanic)	1,175	67.07%
Native American	6	0.34%
Other/Mixed	51	2.91%
Hispanic or Latino	55	3.14%

== Economy ==
Coushatta is the home of C Troop 2-108th Cavalry Squadron, a unit dating back to the Confederate Army during the Civil War under the nickname "the Wildbunch." This unit was formerly known as A Company 1-156 Armor Battalion and served recently in Iraq during 2004–2005 under the 256th Infantry Brigade. This unit returned from its second deployment to Iraq in 2010.

== Education ==
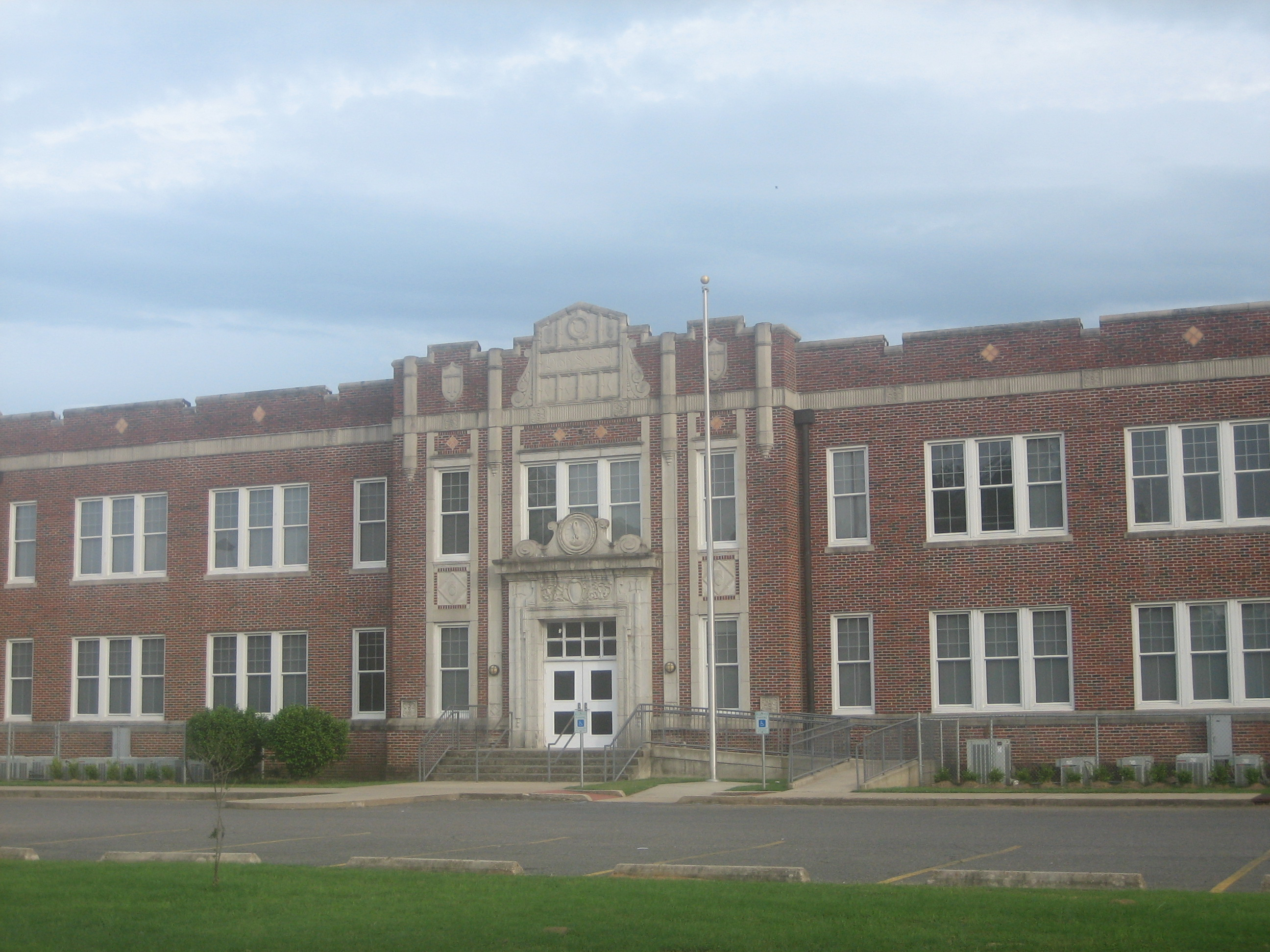
Red River Junior and Senior High School in Coushatta

Coushatta and all of Red River Parish are served by the Red River Parish School District. Zoned campuses include Red River Elementary School (grades PK–5), Red River Junior High School (grades 6–8), and Red River Senior High School (grades 9–12). Coushatta is also home to Magnolia Bend Academy (grades PK-12), a “homeschool service” with both in-person and at-home enrollment options.

== Media ==
Newspapers include The Coushatta Citizen and Red River Parish Journal. Radio station KRRP broadcasts gospel music.

== Notable people ==
- Joe Adcock, slugging first baseman for the Milwaukee Braves in the 1950s, was born and reared in Coushatta.
- Robert Charles Browne, Convicted murderer and suspected serial killer
- John Hilliard, Defensive end who played for the Seattle Seahawks
- Andrew R. Johnson (1856–1933), Louisiana state senator from 1916 to 1924 from Bienville and Claiborne parishes and mayor of Homer, Louisiana.
- Vickie Johnson, WNBA New York Liberty (1997–2006), San Antonio Silver Stars (2006–2009)
- Bennie Logan, NFL defensive lineman for the Tennessee Titans
- Lloyd F. Wheat, retired attorney and state senator from Red River and Natchitoches parishes from 1948 to 1952
- W. Scott Wilkinson, Coushatta native and a Shreveport attorney, state representative for Caddo Parish

== In popular culture ==
Huell Babineaux, a fictional character from the American television shows Breaking Bad and Better Call Saul, is from Coushatta. Coushatta plays a pivotal role in the Better Call Saul episode of the same name.
