= Red River Parish School District =

School district in Louisiana, United States

Red River Parish Public Schools

Location
- Coordinates: 32.01235°N 93.33586°W

District information
- Motto: Every child. Every day. Whatever it takes
- Grades: K-12
- Superintendent: Alison Strong
- Schools: Red River Elementary School, Red River Junior High, Red River High School, Ware Youth Center

Students and staff
- Students: 1270
- Faculty: 274

Other information
- Website: https://rrbulldogs.com

Red River Parish Public Schools is a public school district headquartered in Coushatta, Louisiana, United States.

The district serves all of Red River Parish. The district's mascot is the Bulldog.

== Schools ==
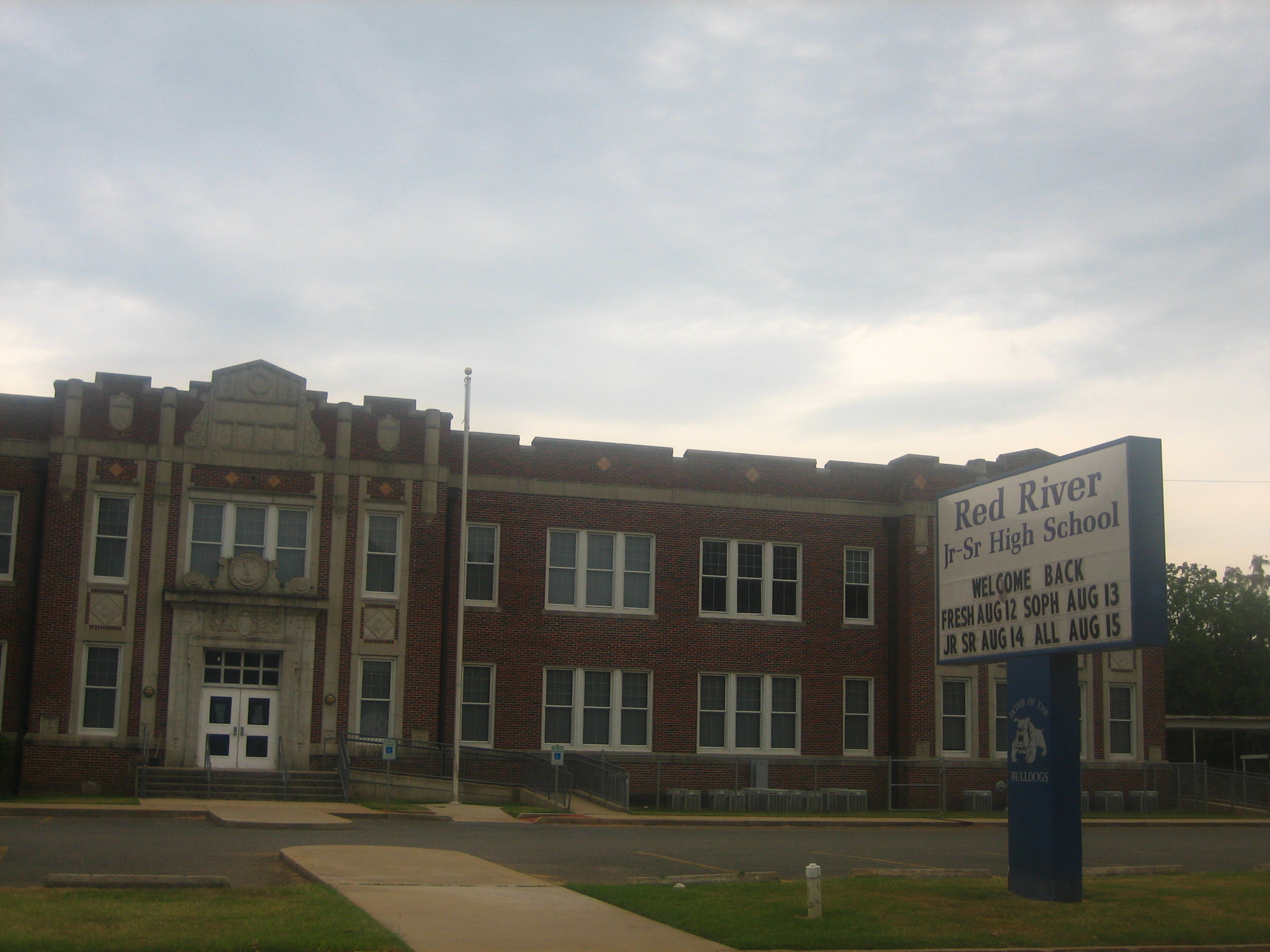
Red River Junior/Senior High School in Coushatta. The school is split into two separate campuses - Red River Junior High and Red River High - that operate separately of each other.

=== High school ===
- Grades 9-12
  - Red River Senior High School (Coushatta) (Bulldogs)

=== Junior high school ===
- Grades 6-8
  - Red River Junior High School (Coushatta)

=== Elementary school ===
- Grades PK-5
  - Red River Elementary School (Coushatta)

=== Academy ===
- Grades PK-12
  - Riverdale Academy (Unincorporated area)

=== Other Campuses ===
- Red River Parish Springville Educational Center (Unincorporated area)
- Ware Youth Center (Unincorporated area)

== Demographics ==
- Total Students (as of October 1, 2007): 1,509
- Gender
  - Male: 51%
  - Female: 49%
- Race/Ethnicity
  - African American: 66.27%
  - Caucasian: 32.80%
  - Hispanic: 0.46%
  - Asian: 0.27%
  - Native American: 0.20%
- Socio-Economic Indicators
  - At-Risk: 85.82%
  - Free Lunch: 78.40%
  - Reduced Lunch: 7.42%

== School uniforms ==
All students enrolled in Red River Parish Schools are required to wear uniforms.

== See also ==
- List of school districts in Louisiana
- Benjamin Milam Teekell
