= National Register of Historic Places listings in St. Martin Parish, Louisiana =

Location of St. Martin Parish in Louisiana

This is a list of the National Register of Historic Places listings in St. Martin Parish, Louisiana.

This is intended to be a complete list of the properties and districts on the National Register of Historic Places in St. Martin Parish, Louisiana, United States. The locations of National Register properties and districts for which the latitude and longitude coordinates are included below, may be seen in a map.

There are 25 properties and districts listed on the National Register in the parish, including 1 National Historic Landmark. There is one former listing.

This National Park Service list is complete through NPS recent listings posted August 28, 2026.

== Current listings ==
	Name on the Register	Image	Date listed	Location	City or town	Description
1	Emile Bergeron Farmstead	Emile Bergeron Farmstead	March 13, 2024 (#100010048)	4507-C Main Highway; 30°14′41″N 91°53′06″W	Breaux Bridge	
2	Bonin House	Bonin House	January 27, 1997 (#96001609)	421 N. Main St. 30°07′39″N 91°49′41″W	St. Martinville	
3	Breaux Bridge Historic District	Breaux Bridge Historic District	July 28, 1995 (#95000907)	Roughly bounded by Bayou Teche, Van Buren St., Main St., and Bridge St. 30°16′26″N 91°53′55″W	Breaux Bridge	
4	Burdin House		December 9, 1999 (#99001479)	422 N. Pinaud St. 30°07′40″N 91°49′25″W	St. Martinville	
5	Dautreuil House	Dautreuil House	March 30, 1995 (#95000356)	517 E. Bridge St. 30°07′21″N 91°49′28″W	St. Martinville	
6	Fontenette-Durand Maison Dimanche		April 19, 1984 (#84001356)	Louisiana Highway 94; 30°15′56″N 91°55′40″W	Breaux Bridge vicinity	
7	Fourgeaud House	Fourgeaud House	May 5, 1999 (#99000527)	130 S. Main St. 30°16′23″N 91°53′56″W	Breaux Bridge	
8	Katie Plantation House		June 29, 2001 (#01000669)	1015 John D. Hebert Dr. 30°13′03″N 91°54′16″W	Breaux Bridge vicinity	
9	Levert-St. John Bridge	Levert-St. John Bridge	March 26, 1998 (#98000268)	O'Neal Boudreaux Rd. over the Bayou Teche; 30°09′29″N 91°48′43″W	St. Martinville vicinity	
10	Maison Olivier (Acadian House)	Maison Olivier (Acadian House)	March 30, 1973 (#73002133)	1200 N. Main St., within Longfellow-Evangeline State Historic Site; 30°08′17″N 91°49′30″W	St. Martinville	National Historic Landmark
11	Old Castillo Hotel	Old Castillo Hotel	July 24, 1979 (#79003122)	220 Port St. 30°07′17″N 91°49′39″W	St. Martinville	Street renamed to Evangeline Blvd
12	Olivier Pigeonnier	Olivier Pigeonnier	March 14, 1983 (#83000541)	Southwest of Breaux Bridge off Louisiana Highway 94; 30°15′57″N 91°55′43″W	Breaux Bridge vicinity	
13	Patin House	Patin House	November 13, 1991 (#91001680)	219 W. Bridge St. 30°16′19″N 91°54′01″W	Breaux Bridge	
14	Pellerin-Chauffe House	Pellerin-Chauffe House	April 5, 1984 (#84001358)	South of Breaux Bridge on Louisiana Highway 347; 30°15′35″N 91°52′57″W	Breaux Bridge vicinity	
15	Henri Penne House	Henri Penne House	June 9, 1980 (#80004252)	West of Breaux Bridge; 30°15′54″N 91°55′42″W	Breaux Bridge vicinity	
16	Ransonet House	Ransonet House	May 10, 1990 (#90000748)	431 E. Bridge St. 30°16′32″N 91°53′53″W	Breaux Bridge	
17	St. Martin of Tours Catholic Church	St. Martin of Tours Catholic Church	April 10, 1972 (#72001454)	133 S. Main St. 30°07′22″N 91°49′41″W	St. Martinville	
18	St. Martin Parish Courthouse	St. Martin Parish Courthouse	November 19, 1981 (#81000658)	S. Main St. 30°07′09″N 91°49′47″W	St. Martinville	
19	St. Martinville Elementary School	St. Martinville Elementary School	October 18, 1996 (#96001162)	303 Church St. 30°07′17″N 91°49′59″W	St. Martinville	No longer extant per Google Street View.
20	St. Martinville Historic District		January 27, 1983 (#83000542)	Louisiana Highways 31 and 96; 30°07′24″N 91°49′42″W	St. Martinville	
21	Sandoz House	Sandoz House	October 29, 1982 (#82000456)	West of St. Martinville on Louisiana Highway 96; 30°08′03″N 91°53′35″W	St. Martinville vicinity	Destroyed by fire, 1985.
22	Soulier House	Soulier House	May 23, 1997 (#97000466)	417 N. Main St. 30°07′36″N 91°49′42″W	St. Martinville	
23	Stephanie Plantation House	Stephanie Plantation House	May 20, 1998 (#98000570)	1862 Louisiana Highway 347; 30°21′16″N 91°52′44″W	Arnaudville vicinity	
24	U.S. Post Office	U.S. Post Office	April 5, 1972 (#72001455)	Main and Port Sts. 30°07′19″N 91°49′45″W	St. Martinville	
25	D. W. Voorhies House		October 16, 2008 (#08001011)	410 Washington St. 30°07′14″N 91°49′55″W	St. Martinville	

== Former listings ==
	Name on the Register	Image	Date listed	Date removed	Location	City or town	Description
1	Fontenette-Bienvenu House	Fontenette-Bienvenu House	August 21, 1997 (#97000876)	March 13, 2024	201 N. Main St. 30°07′30″N 91°49′44″W	St. Martinville	

== See also ==
- List of National Historic Landmarks in Louisiana
- National Register of Historic Places listings in Louisiana
