= National Register of Historic Places listings in Red River Parish, Louisiana =

Location of Red River Parish in Louisiana

This is a list of the National Register of Historic Places listings in Red River Parish, Louisiana.

This is intended to be a complete list of the properties on the National Register of Historic Places in Red River Parish, Louisiana, United States. The locations of National Register properties for which the latitude and longitude coordinates are included below, may be seen in a map.

There are 2 properties listed on the National Register in the parish, and one formerly-listed property.

This National Park Service list is complete through NPS recent listings posted December 12, 2025.

== Current listings ==
	Name on the Register	Image	Date listed	Location	City or town	Description
1	Coushatta Bank Building	Coushatta Bank Building	September 8, 1983 (#83000536)	103 Carroll St. 32°00′30″N 93°21′04″W	Coushatta	
2	Thomas House	Thomas House	February 22, 2002 (#02000038)	Louisiana Highway 787; 32°04′21″N 93°10′51″W	Martin vicinity	

== Former listings ==
	Name on the Register	Image	Date listed	Date removed	Location	City or town	Description
1	Planter's Hotel	Planter's Hotel	December 3, 1980 (#80001758)	November 29, 2016	Carroll St. 32°01′18″N 93°21′02″W	Coushatta	Burned down around 2006 and subsequently delisted.

== See also ==
- List of National Historic Landmarks in Louisiana
- National Register of Historic Places listings in Louisiana
