= Bonin House =

- U.S. National Register of Historic Places
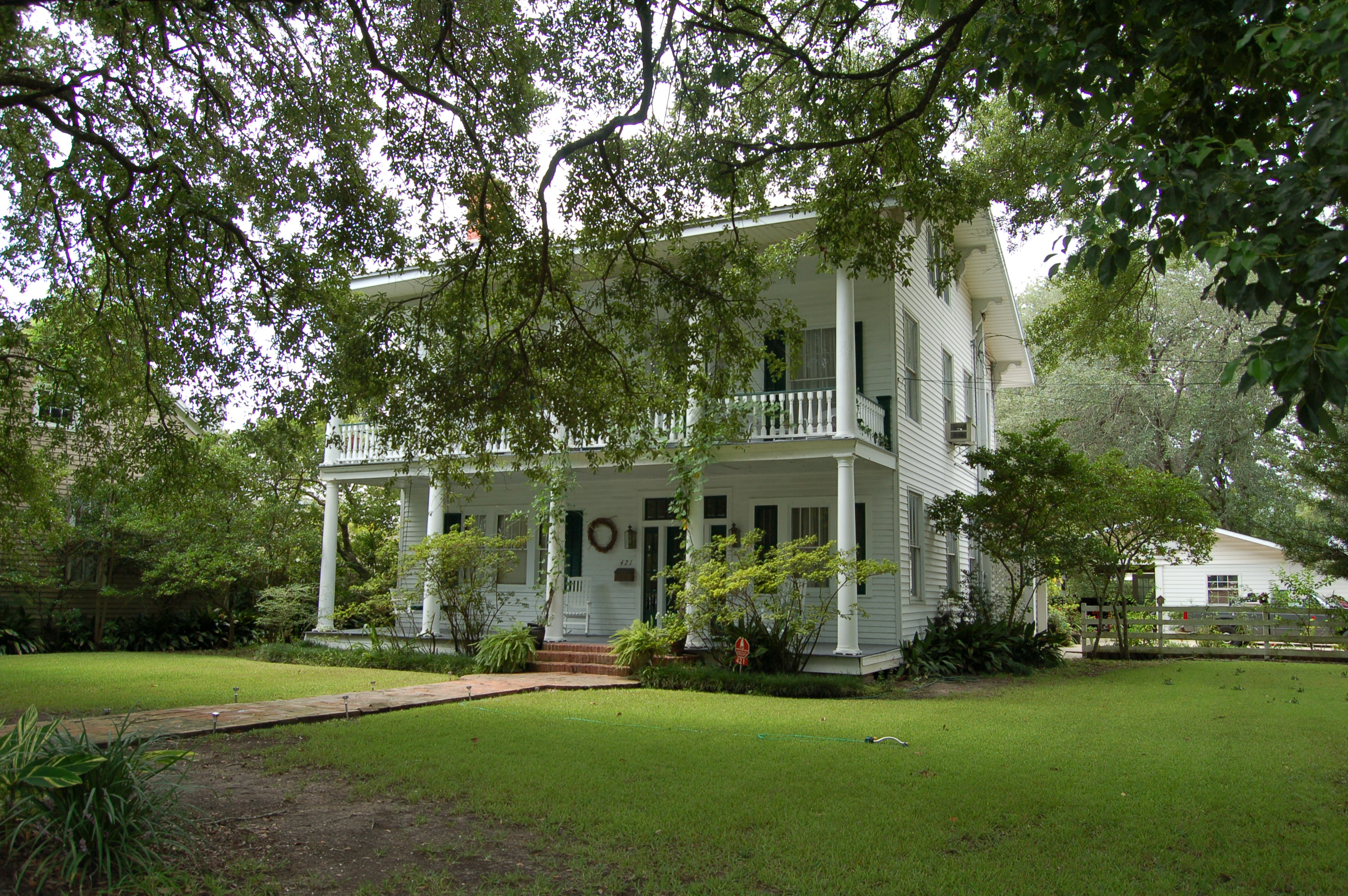

- Location within Louisiana
- Location: 421 North Main Street, St. Martinville, Louisiana
- Coordinates: 30°07′39″N 91°49′41″W
- Area: less than one acre
- Built: 1850
- Architectural style: Colonial Revival, Italianate, Greek Revival
- NRHP reference No.: 96001609
- Added to NRHP: January 27, 1997

The Bonin House is a historic house in St. Martinville, Louisiana, U.S.. It was built in 1850, and designed in the Greek Revival architectural style. It was redesigned in the Italianate style in 1875, and in the Colonial Revival style in 1910. It belonged to Luke Bonin and his wife, Blanche, from 1904 to 1964, and to their grandson, Willie Z. Bienvenu, from 1969 to 1996. It has been listed on the National Register of Historic Places since January 27, 1997.
