= Fontenette =

Fontenette is a surname. Notable people with the surname include:

- Ken Fontenette (born 1986), American football player
- Olivier Fontenette (born 1982), French footballer
- Randon Fontenette (born 2005), American college football player
- Taurian Fontenette (1983–2026), American streetball player

== See also ==
- Fontenette-Bienvenu House, historic house in St. Martinville, Louisiana, U.S.
