= Longfellow-Evangeline State Historic Site =

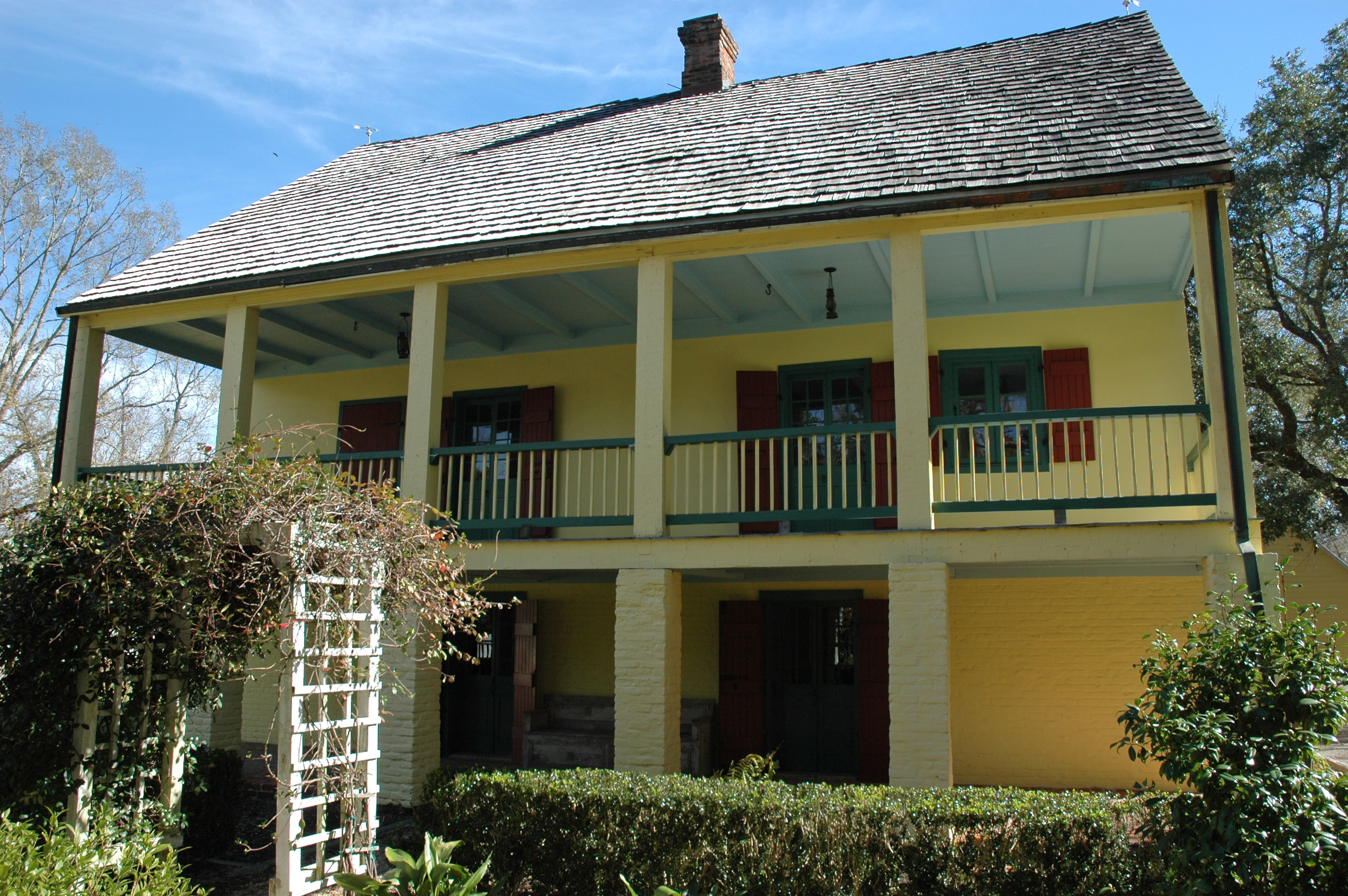
- Maison Olivier

- Location within Louisiana
- Location: St. Martin Parish, Louisiana, United States of America
- Coordinates: 30°08′02″N 91°49′36″W
- Area: approx. 157 acres (64 ha)
- Established: 1934
- Governing body: Louisiana Office of State Parks
- Website: Official web site
- Acadian House
- U.S. National Register of Historic Places
- U.S. National Historic Landmark
- Built: c. 1815
- NRHP reference No.: 73002133

Significant dates
- Added to NRHP: March 30, 1973
- Designated NHL: May 30, 1974

Longfellow-Evangeline State Historic Site (French: Site historique d'État Longfellow-Evangeline), located in St. Martinville, Louisiana, showcases the cultural significance of the Bayou Teche region. It is the oldest state park site in Louisiana, founded in 1934 as the Longfellow-Evangeline State Commemorative Area. Evangeline was Henry Wadsworth Longfellow's enormously popular 1847 epic poem about Acadian lovers, who are now figures in local history. In the town center, the Evangeline Oak is the legendary meeting place of the two lovers, Evangeline and Gabriel. A statue of Evangeline marks her supposed grave next to St. Martin of Tours Church. The state historic site commemorates the broader historical setting of the poem in the Acadian and Creole culture of this region of Louisiana.

Several historic buildings are showcased at Longfellow-Evangeline State Historic Site, which cover 157 acres (0.64 km^{2}):

Maison Olivier, designated a National Historic Landmark (as Acadian House) in 1974, is a plantation home built c. 1815 by Pierre Olivier Duclozel de Vezin, a wealthy Creole at the time. The structure is an excellent example of a Raised Creole Cottage, a simple and distinctive architectural form which shows a mixture of Creole, Caribbean, and French influences. Maison Olivier is located behind the visitor center. Also near Maison Olivier is a blacksmith shop.

There is also a c. 1790 Acadian cabin, which reveals the contrast between Acadian and Creole architecture.

A reproduction Acadian farmstead lies near Bayou Teche. It is representative of a single-family farm in the early 19th century. It includes a family home, a barn, a privy, an outdoor kitchen, and a bread oven.

== See also ==
- List of Louisiana state parks
- List of National Historic Landmarks in Louisiana
- National Register of Historic Places listings in St. Martin Parish, Louisiana
