= D. W. Voorhies House =

Historic house in Louisiana, United States

- U.S. National Register of Historic Places
- Location within Louisiana Location within the United States
- Location: 410 Washington St., St. Martinville, Louisiana
- Coordinates: 30.1205°N 91.8319°W
- Area: less than 1 acre
- Built: 1903
- Architectural style: Queen Anne Revival, Eastlake
- NRHP reference No.: 08001011
- Added to NRHP: October 16, 2008

D. W. Voorhies House is a house in St. Martinville, Louisiana, United States. The building was listed on the National Register of Historic Places on October 16, 2008.

The house was built in 1903 with many decorative features, all of which survive, although one, the front door, was moved to a different location in the house. The details include fishscale shingles, an oculus, and beaded rails in a wraparound porch.

It is the 16th property listed as a featured property of the week in a program of the National Park Service that began in July, 2008.
