= Alexandria Garden District =

Historic district in Louisiana, United States

- U.S. National Register of Historic Places
- U.S. Historic district
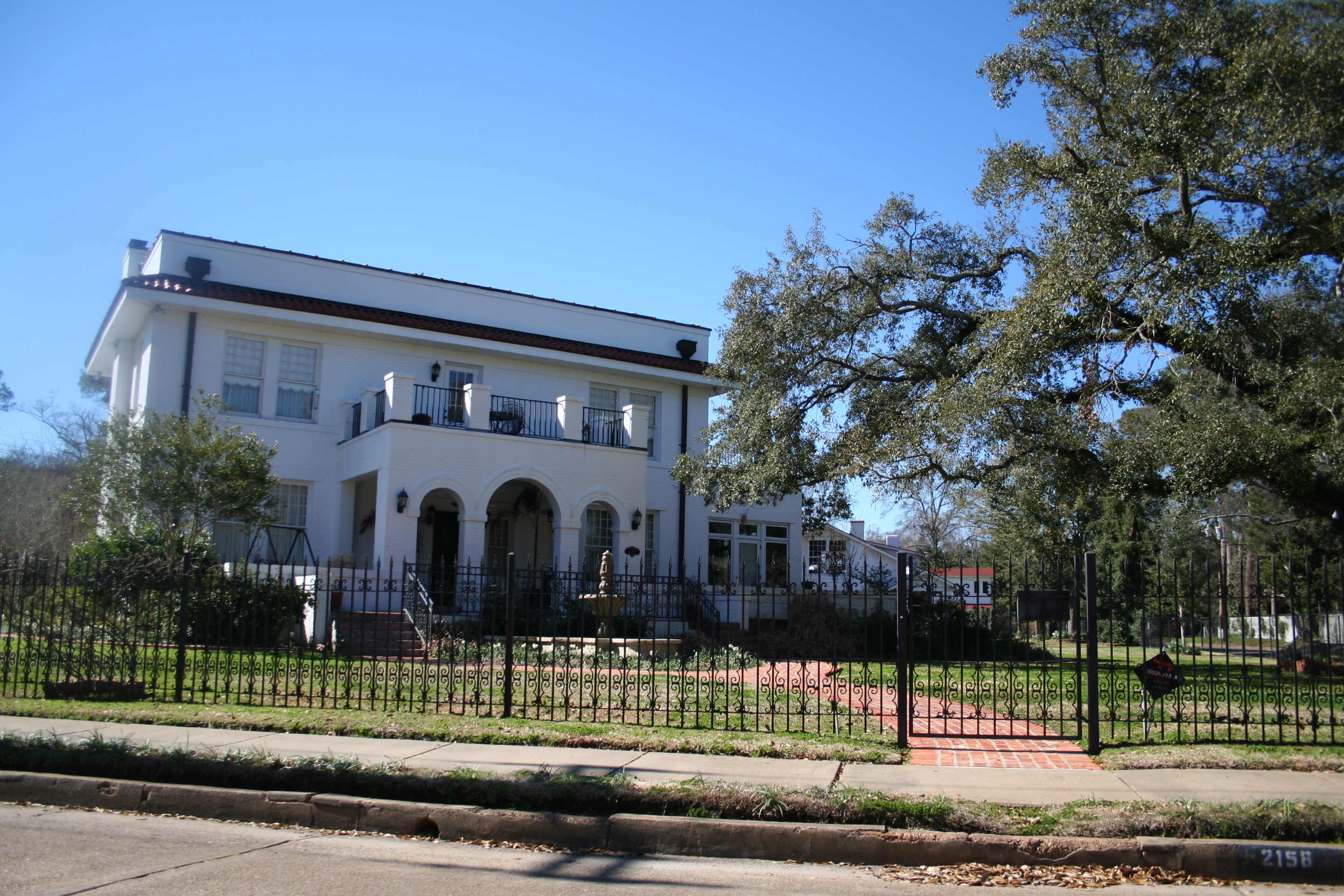

- Location within Louisiana Location within the United States
- Location: Roughly bounded Marye St., Bolton Ave., White St., and Bayou Hynson, Alexandria, Louisiana
- Coordinates: 31°17′59″N 92°27′32″W
- Area: 105 acres (42 ha)
- Architectural style: Bungalow/Craftsman, Colonial Revival, et al.
- NRHP reference No.: 01000336
- Added to NRHP: April 09, 2001

Alexandria Garden District is located in Alexandria, Louisiana. It was added to the National Register of Historic Places on April 9, 2001. Boundaries of the district are approximately described as Marye Street, Bolton Avenue, White Street, and Hynson Bayou. 60 percent of the 293 buildings included in the district are classified as non-contributing, the highest rate among National Register Historic Districts in Louisiana.

Bolton High School falls within the district. Many city leaders of the 1940s through the 1970s lived in the Garden District.
