= National Register of Historic Places listings in Louisiana =

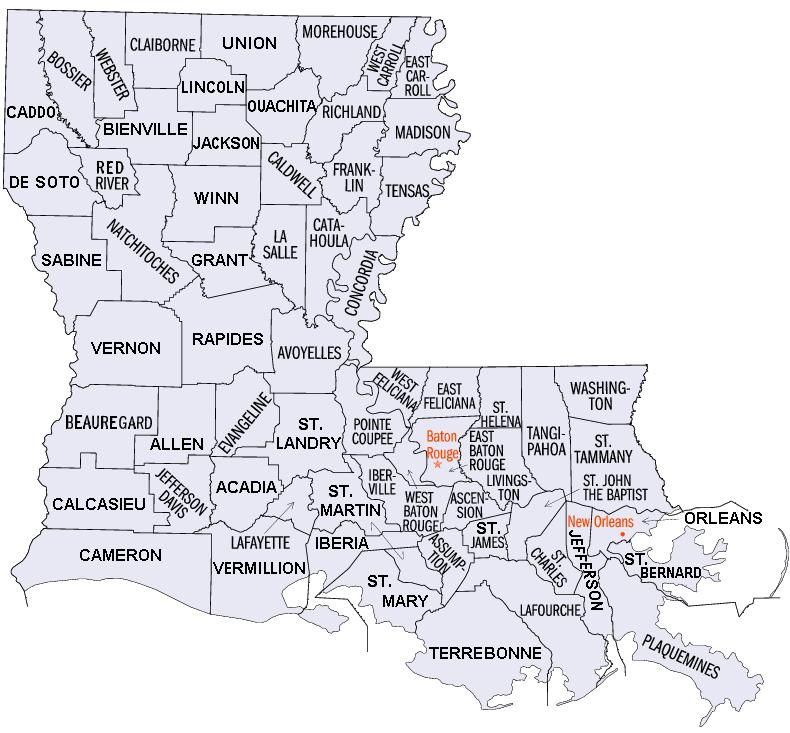
Map of Louisiana's 64 parishes

This is a list of properties and districts in Louisiana that are listed on the National Register of Historic Places. There are listings in each of Louisiana's 64 parishes.

The locations of National Register properties and districts (at least for all showing latitude and longitude coordinates below), may be seen in a map by clicking on "Map of all coordinates".

== Current listings by parish ==
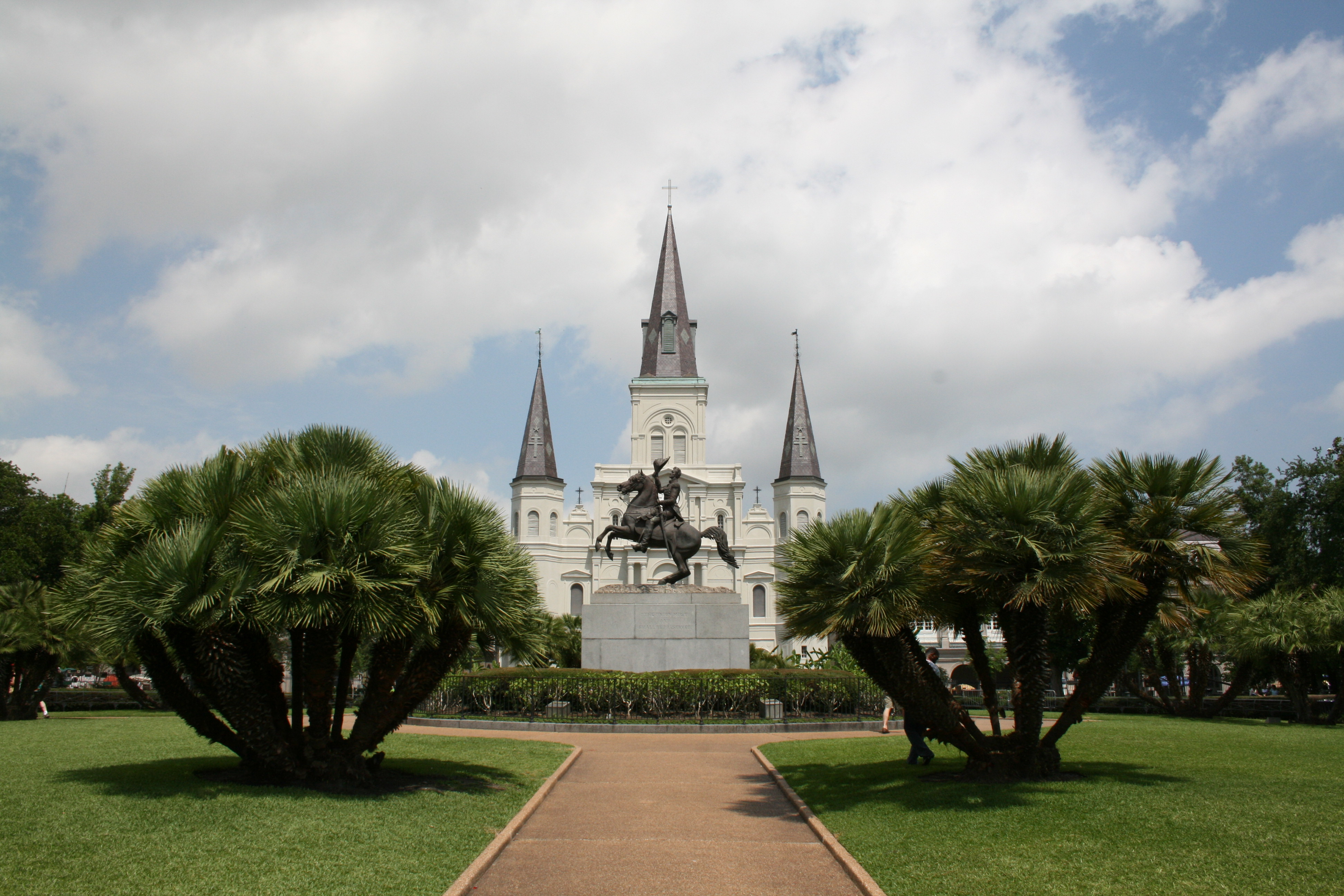
Jackson Square, in Orleans Parish

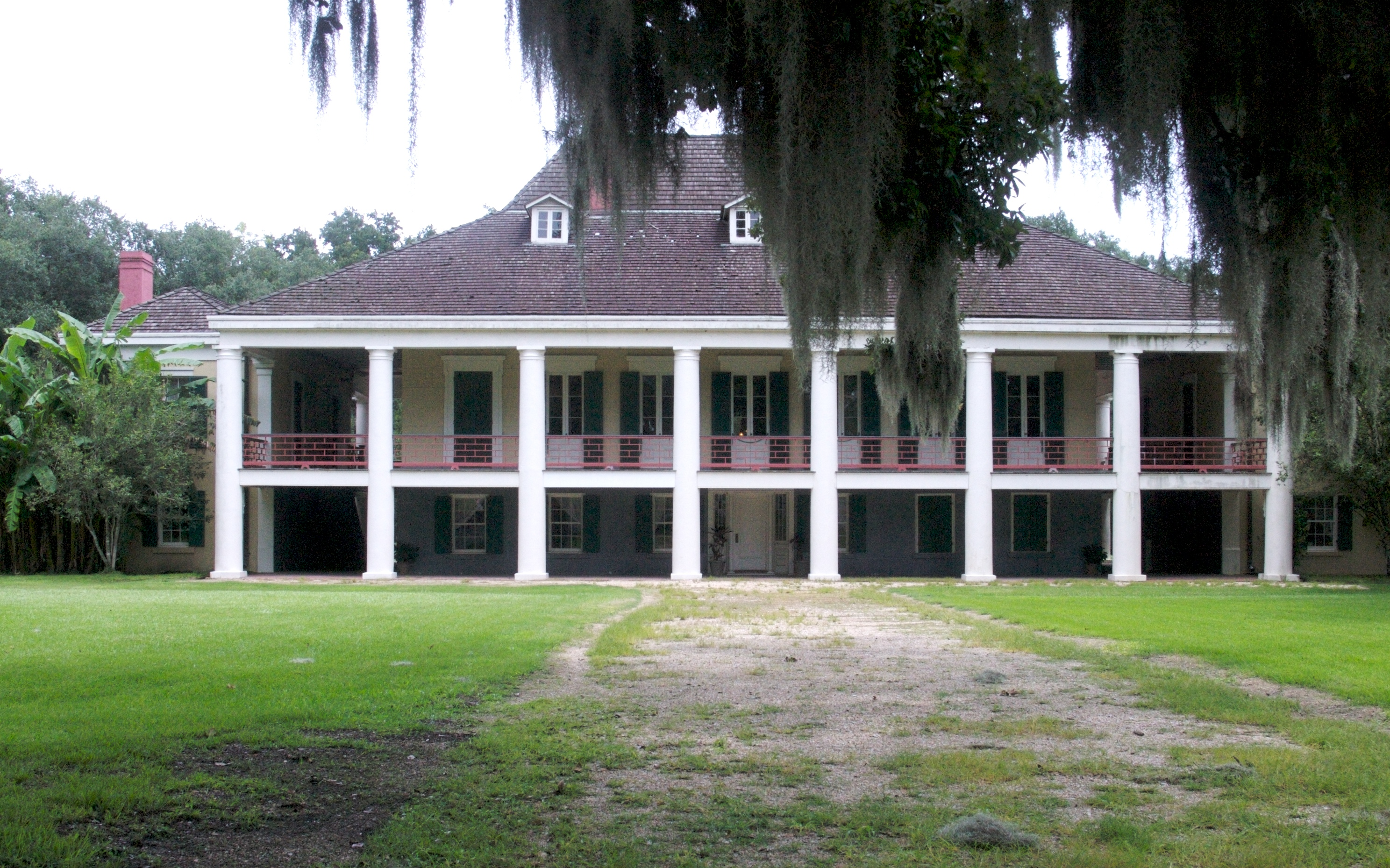
Destrehan Plantation, in St. Charles Parish

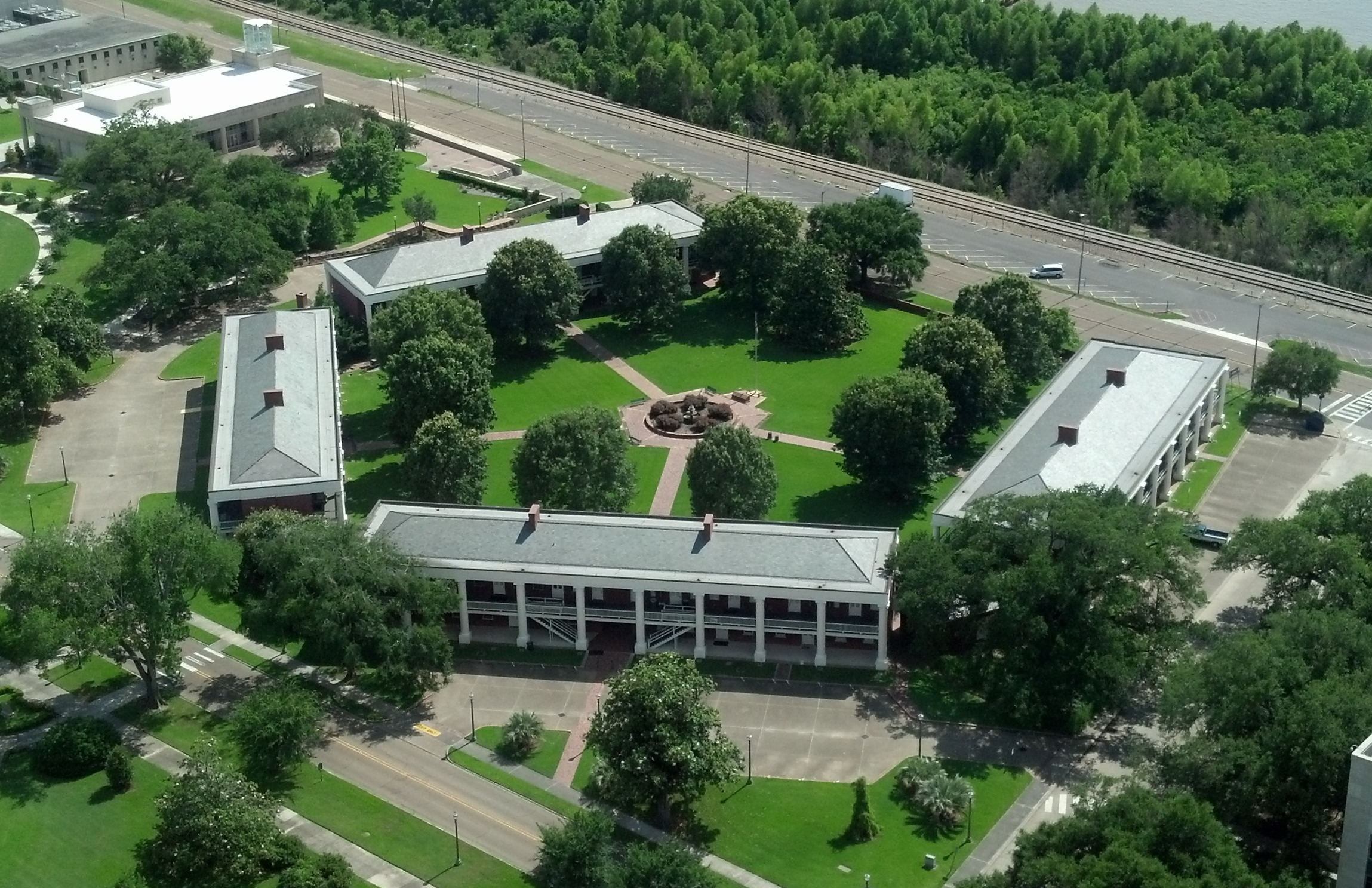
Pentagon Barracks, in East Baton Rouge Parish

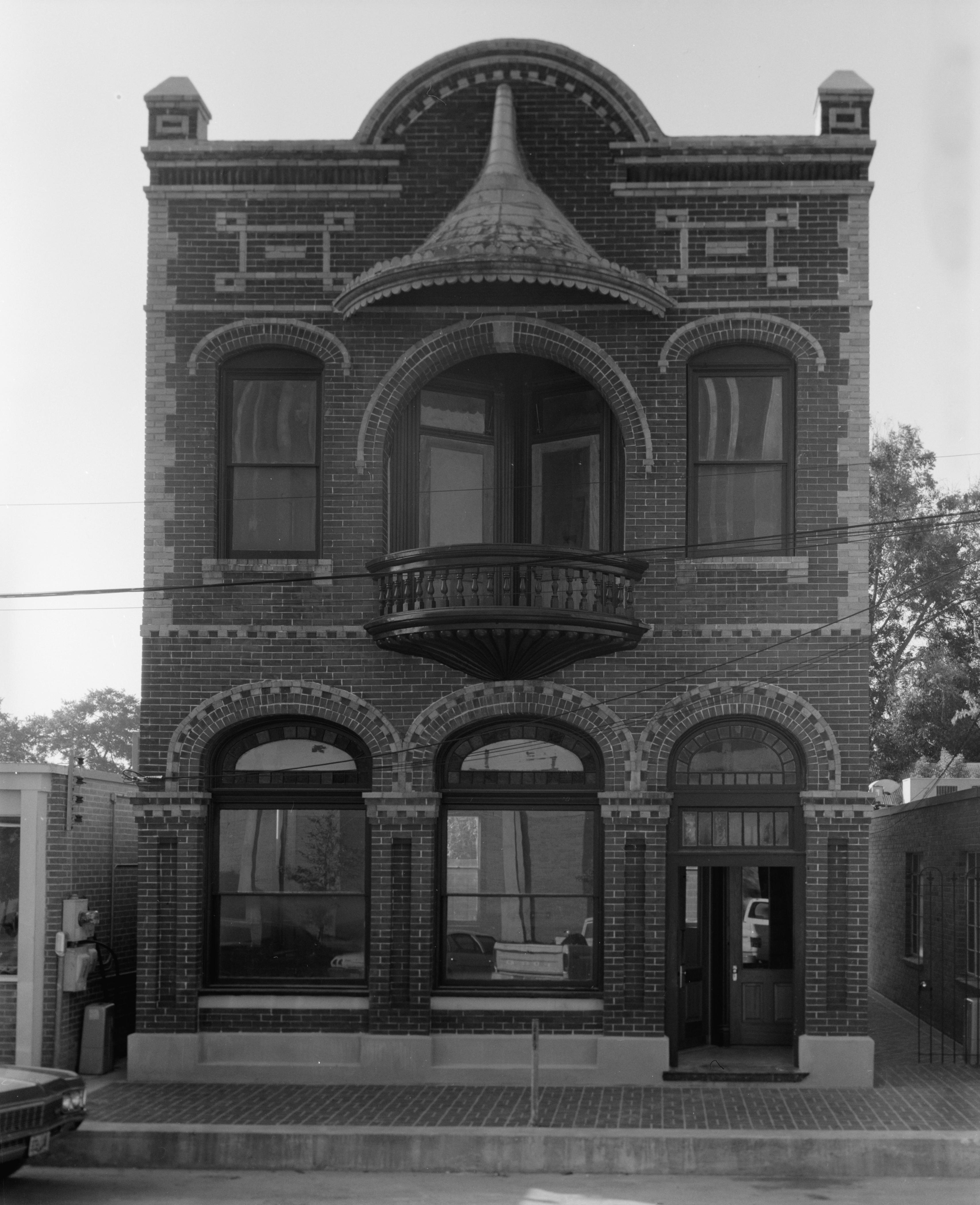
Old Lafayette City Hall, in Lafayette Parish

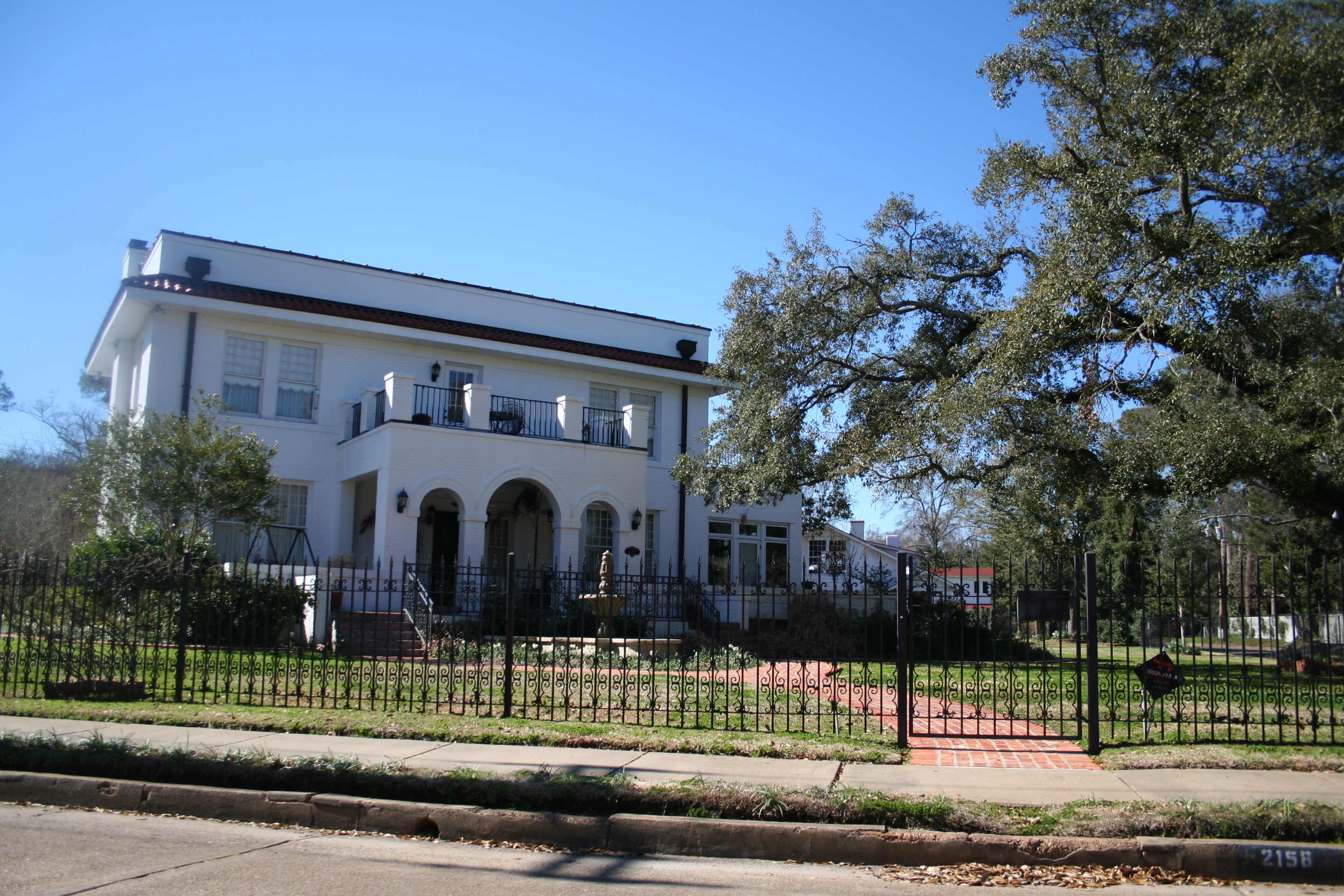
Alexandria Garden District, in Rapides Parish

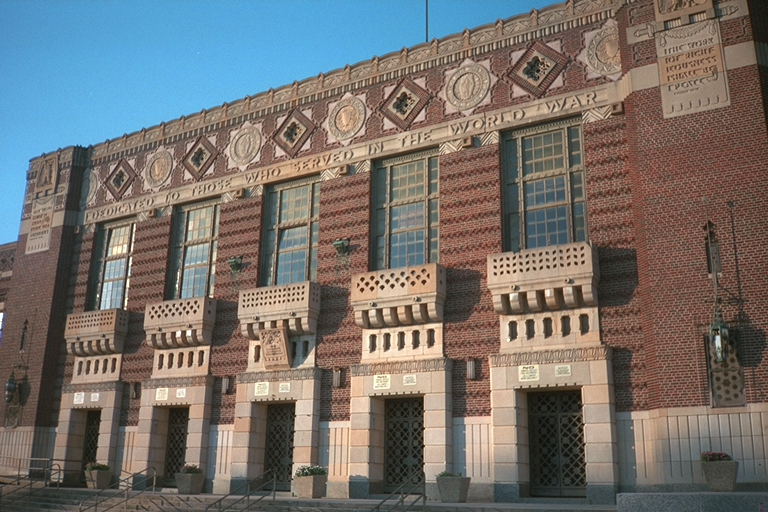
Shreveport Municipal Memorial Auditorium, in Caddo Parish

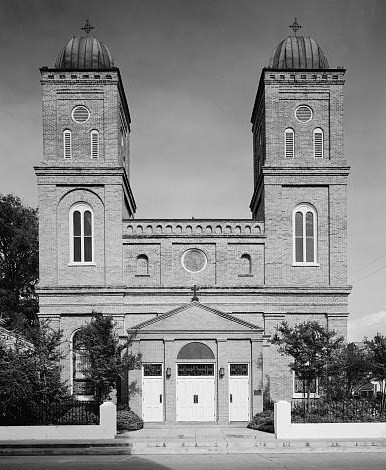
Natchitoches Historic District, in Natchitoches Parish

The following are approximate tallies of current listings by parish. These counts are based on entries in the National Register Information Database as of June 6, 2025 and new weekly listings posted since then on the National Register of Historic Places web site. There are frequent additions to the listings and occasional delistings and the counts here are approximate and not official. New entries are added to the official Register on a weekly basis. Also, the counts in this table exclude boundary increase and decrease listings which only modify the area covered by an existing property or district, although carrying a separate National Register reference number.

	Parish	# of Sites
1	Acadia	12
2	Allen	4
3	Ascension	17
4	Assumption	9
5	Avoyelles	30
6	Beauregard	12
7	Bienville	13
8	Bossier	6
9	Caddo	71
10	Calcasieu	22
11	Caldwell	10
12	Cameron	2
13	Catahoula	14
14	Claiborne	13
15	Concordia	13
16	De Soto	28
17	East Baton Rouge	95
18	East Carroll	8
19	East Feliciana	33
20	Evangeline	5
21	Franklin	4
22	Grant	8
23	Iberia	34
24	Iberville	25
25	Jackson	6
26	Jefferson	27
27	Jefferson Davis	18
28	La Salle	6
29	Lafayette	43
30	Lafourche	38
31	Lincoln	31
32	Livingston	16
33	Madison	14
34	Morehouse	9
35	Natchitoches	39
36	Orleans	195
37	Ouachita	34
38	Plaquemines	16
39	Pointe Coupee	33
40	Rapides	82
41	Red River	2
42	Richland	10
43	Sabine	9
44	St. Bernard	12
45	St. Charles	7
46	St. Helena	3
47	St. James	21
48	St. John the Baptist	18
49	St. Landry	37
50	St. Martin	25
51	St. Mary	30
52	St. Tammany	44
53	Tangipahoa	32
54	Tensas	10
55	Terrebonne	23
56	Union	12
57	Vermilion	20
58	Vernon	16
59	Washington	18
60	Webster	19
61	West Baton Rouge	16
62	West Carroll	4
63	West Feliciana	32
64	Winn	6
(duplicates)		(0)
Total:		1,521

This National Park Service list is complete through NPS recent listings posted October 30, 2026.

== See also ==
- List of National Historic Landmarks in Louisiana
- List of bridges on the National Register of Historic Places in Louisiana
- List of historical societies in Louisiana
