= Dautreuil House =

- U.S. National Register of Historic Places
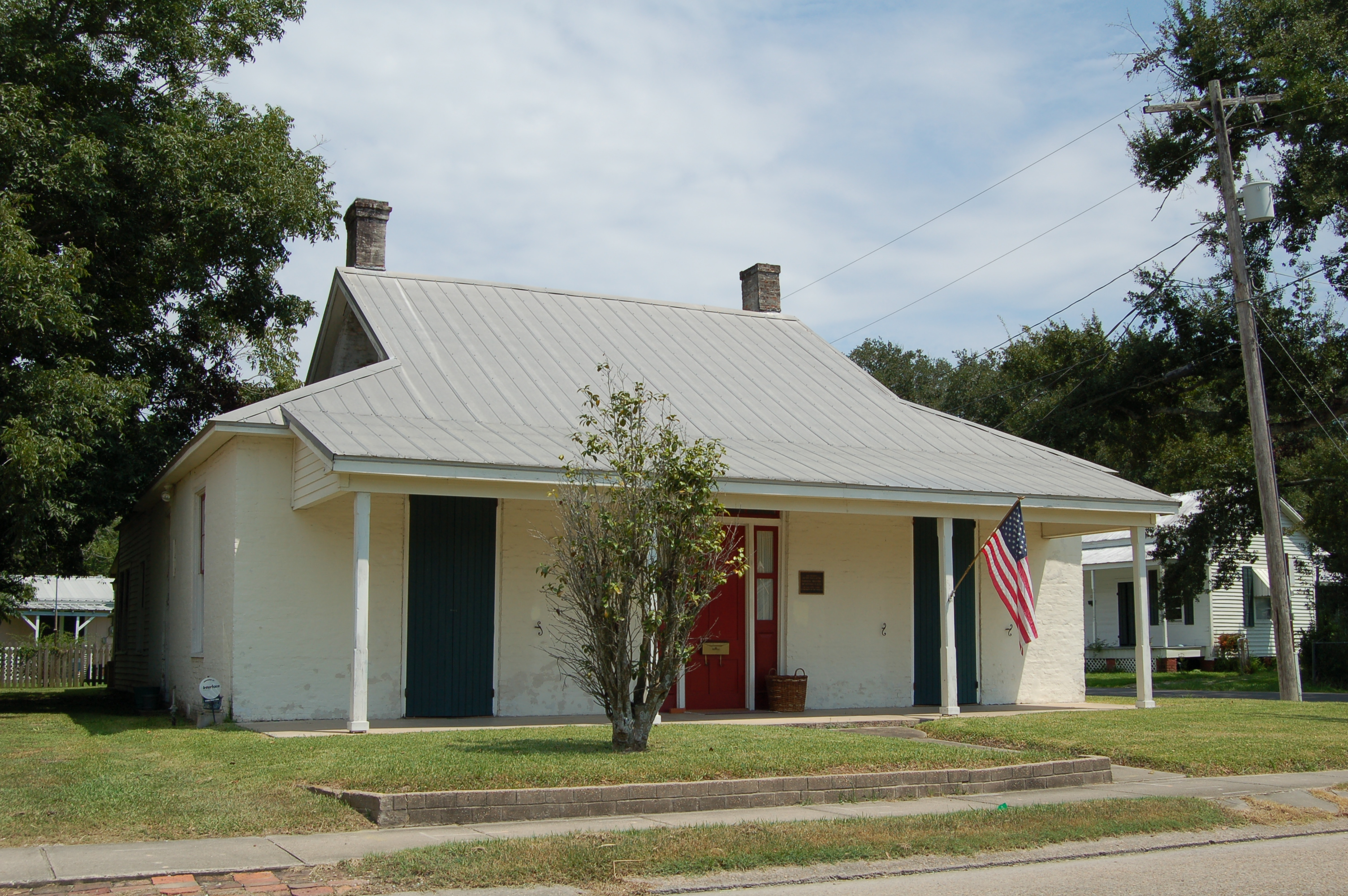

- Location within Louisiana
- Location: 517 E. Bridge St., St. Martinville, Louisiana
- Coordinates: 30°07′21″N 91°49′28″W
- Area: less than one acre
- Built: c.1840
- Architectural style: Greek Revival, French Creole
- NRHP reference No.: 95000356
- Added to NRHP: March 30, 1995

The Dautreuil House, at 517 E. Bridge St. in St. Martinville, Louisiana, was built around 1840. It was listed on the National Register of Historic Places in 1995.

It is a one-story brick house, with brick laid in common bond, with Creole and Greek Revival influences.

The Dautreuil family believes that the house was built by Louis Dautreuil and his wife Eupheme Bertrand Dautreuil. They had 11 children together. Louis and Eupheme are buried in the local cemetery.

It has been operated as the La Maison Louie Bed and Breakfast.
