= James C. Thibodeaux =

American photographer (1911–2004)

James Charles Thibodeaux
- Born: July 21, 1911; St. Martinville, Louisiana, U.S.
- Died: August 19, 2004 (aged 93); New Orleans, Louisiana, U.S.
- Education: Cooper Union, Mechanics' Institute
- Occupations: Photographer, painter, educator, stage actor, television operations supervisor

James Charles Thibodeaux (July 21, 1911 – August 19, 2004), was an American photographer, painter, stage actor, and educator. He was the United States Army's first Black art instructor.

== Early life and education ==
James C. Thibodeaux was born on July 21, 1911, in St. Martinville, Louisiana, to parents Fannie E. (née Young) and Ernest Charles Thibodeaux, Sr.. His mother died when he was a child, and by 1920 the family had moved to the North Dallas area of Dallas, Texas. They lived near the Central Avenue (or Central Track) shopping district, and their local barbershop was a common hangout of Blind Lemon Jefferson during this time period. He attended Catholic high school, at the Sisters’ Institute (later known as St. Peter’s Academy), and graduated at age 17 in 1928.

Starting in 1929, Thibodeaux attended Cooper Union, and later the Mechanics’ Institute (an affiliated institution to Cooper Union) in New York City; he had a full scholarship. While attending college, he worked under noted Black printmaker Bernie Haynes Robynson; whom he met through sculptor and teacher, Augusta Savage. Thibodeaux attended classes at the General Society of Mechanics and Tradesmen, and in 1932 earned a diploma in freehand drawing.

== Career ==
After moving to New York City, he lived at the Harlem YMCA at 180 West 135th Street, and worked as a page for WOR, an independent radio station.

Thibodeaux was drafted on July 10, 1943, and served in the United States Army during World War II. He was the United States Army's special services first Black art instructor.

After his military service he returned to work at WOR. He retired in 1977 from WOR, with his last role as a television operations supervisor. During his career at WOR, he continued to pursue his art, photography, and acting. His art work was shown at the Metropolitan Museum of Art. In 1936, his artwork was exhibited at the Texas Centennial Exposition in the Hall of Negro Life. Subjects of his portrait photographs included boxer Joe Louis, and singer–songwriter Ruth Brown.

Thibodeaux was also a stage actor at the Dallas Negro Players, and later at the Harlem Experimental Players. In 1992, he was recognized by the Junior Black Academy of Arts and Letters as a "Dallas Living Legend".

== Death and legacy ==
He died on August 19, 2004 in New Orleans. Thibodeaux's photograph collection is held at the Dolph Briscoe Center for American History at UT Austin. Oral histories with Thibodeaux were conducted in 1994 and 1997 by the Texas African American Photography Archive.
