= St. Martin Parish Courthouse =

- U.S. National Register of Historic Places
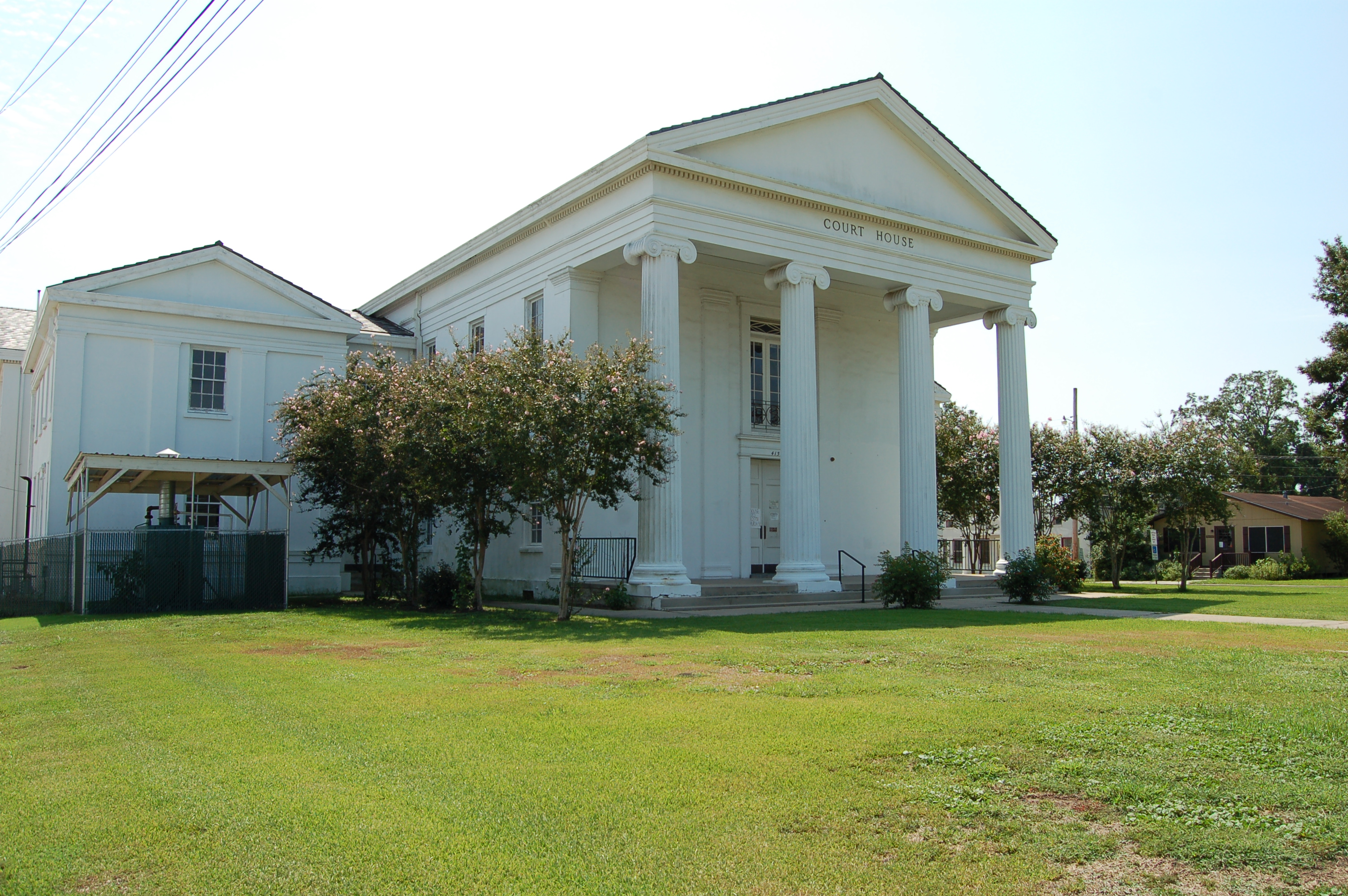

- Location within Louisiana Location within the United States
- Interactive map showing the location of St. Martin Parish Courthouse
- Location: S. Main St., St. Martinville, Louisiana
- Coordinates: 30°07′09″N 91°49′47″W
- Area: 0.2 acres (0.081 ha)
- Built: 1859, 1937
- Architectural style: Greek Revival
- NRHP reference No.: 81000658
- Added to NRHP: November 19, 1981

The St. Martin Parish Courthouse, on S. Main St. in St. Martinville, Louisiana, is a Greek Revival-style courthouse which was built in 1859. It was listed on the National Register of Historic Places in 1981.

It was built in form of a four-column Ionic temple, and is two stories with a central hall plan on each floor. The walls are stuccoed brick; the columns are brick with stucco fluting; the bases and capitals of the columns are of cast iron.

It was expanded in 1937 with the addition of a relatively large rear wing that holds the present courtroom. The original building was modified by installation of marble floors and dado and by installation of an oculus in the tympanum. An iron interior staircase was replaced. The interior has no specific noticeable features remaining from the original 1859 construction.

The courthouse was expanded again in the 1950s and 1960s by addition of two wings with recessed pediments and pilasters.

It was deemed significant in 1980 in the state of Louisiana as one of just four antebellum courthouses still in use, and as one of few temple form Greek Revival buildings.
