= Bernie Haynes Robynson =

American printmaker (1900–2001)

- Born: 1900; Paris, Kentucky, U.S.
- Died: December 20, 2001 (aged 100–101); New York, U.S.
- Other names: Bernie Robynson, Bernie Hayes Robynson, Bernice Haynes Robynson
- Education: Knoxville College, YMCA School of Art, National Academy of Design, Art Students League of New York
- Occupations: Printmaker, illustrator, graphic artist, educator
- Movement: Harlem Renaissance

Bernie Haynes Robynson (1900—2001), was an American printmaker, illustrator, graphic artist, and educator. He is associated with graphic arts history within the Harlem Renaissance, a Black cultural movement of the 1920s in New York City.

== Biography ==
Bernie Haynes Robynson was born in 1900 in Paris, Kentucky into an African American family. Some of his early records use the name Bernice Haynes Robynson. He attended classes at Knoxville College, the YMCA School of Art, the National Academy of Design, and the Art Students League of New York. Robynson had studied under Augusta Savage; British painter and sculptor, Charles Louis Hinton; and cartoonist, Mort Burger.

Robynson did commercial artwork for the Madam C. J. Walker Manufacturing Company, and the Fuller Poster Company. His illustrations were published in The New York Age, The Crisis, and Amsterdam News.

Photographer and painter, James C. Thibodeaux had been one of Robynson's students.

== Death and legacy ==
He died on December 20, 2001. The Oregon Historical Society Research Library has a collection of his posters. The Beinecke Rare Book and Manuscript Library at Yale University also contains his work in the collection. The W. E. B. Du Bois Papers at the Special Collections and University Archives, University of Massachusetts Amherst Libraries contain the 1929 mailing address for Robynson, who was working as an illustrator for The Crisis at the time.

== Exhibitions ==
- 1933, "Exhibition of the Work of Negro Artists", Harmon Foundation, Art Centre, New York City, New York
