= Fontenette-Bienvenu House =

- Formerly listed on the U.S. National Register of Historic Places
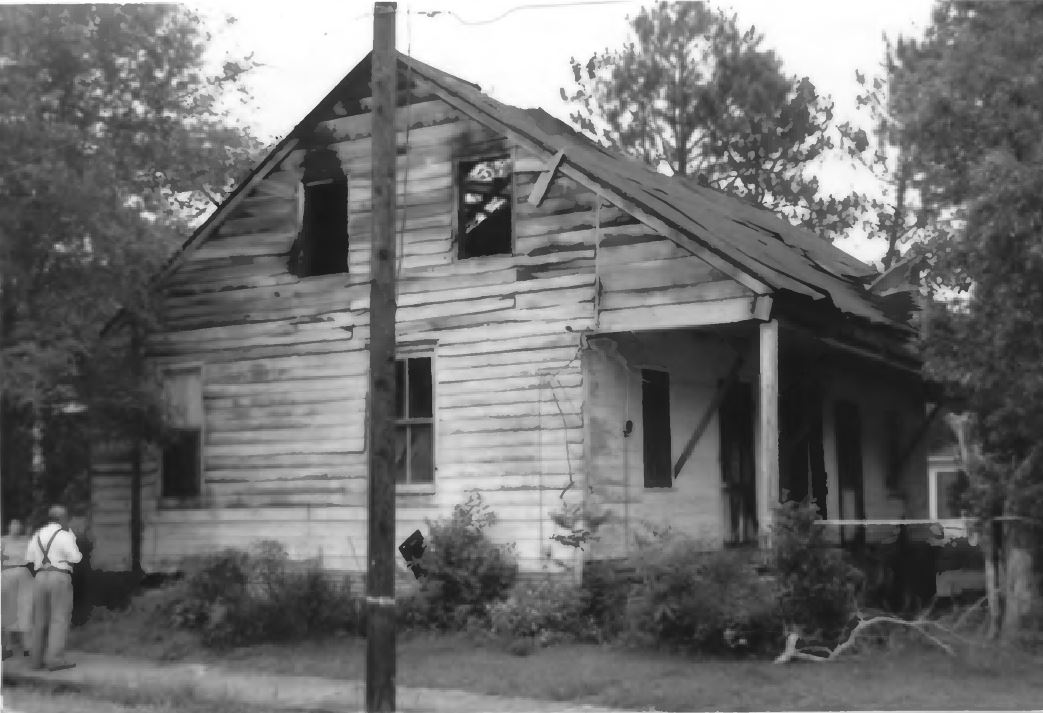

- Location within Louisiana
- Location: 201 N. Main St. St. Martinville, Louisiana
- Coordinates: 30°07′30″N 91°49′44″W
- Area: 0.5 acres (0.20 ha)
- Built: 1817
- Architectural style: Federal, French Creole
- MPS: Louisiana's French Creole Architecture MPS
- NRHP reference No.: 97000876

Significant dates
- Added to NRHP: August 21, 1997
- Removed from NRHP: March 13, 2024

The Fontenette-Bienvenu House, at 201 N. Main St. in St. Martinville, Louisiana, was built in 1817. It was listed on the National Register of Historic Places in 1997, and was delisted in 2024.

It is "a one-and-a-half story Creole cottage of colombage construction with Federal details. It is located on Main Street near the central church square in the parish seat of St. Martinville. The house was completed in either 1817 or early 1818 forJacques Fontenette, who died on April 23, 1818. His succession, opened May 4, 1818, refers to 'a fine house, newly constructed'".
