= Coushatta Bank Building =

- U.S. National Register of Historic Places
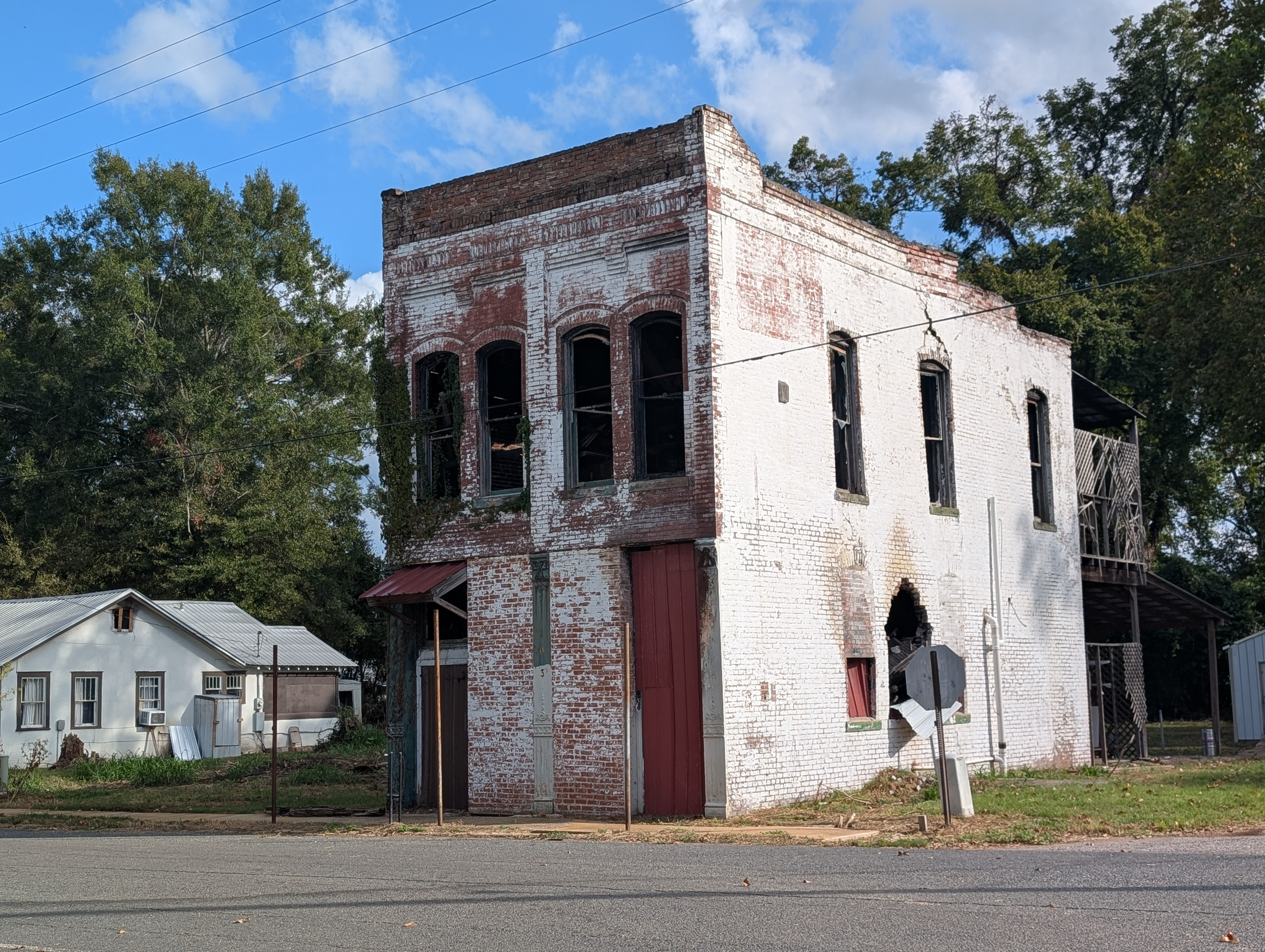
- Coushatta Bank in 2025

- Location within Louisiana Location within the United States
- Location: 103 Carroll St., Coushatta, Louisiana
- Coordinates: 32°0′30″N 93°21′4″W
- Area: 0.1 acres (0.040 ha)
- Built: c.1890
- NRHP reference No.: 83000536
- Added to NRHP: September 8, 1983

The Coushatta Bank Building, at 103 Carroll Street in Coushatta, Louisiana, was built in about 1890. It was listed on the National Register of Historic Places in 1983.

It is a two-story brick false front commercial building. Its facade is topped by a brick-paneled frieze itself topped by a pressed metal entablature and a cornice. It has segmentally arched windows and decorative cast-iron pillars. The building has a brick vault towards the back.

Out of about 40 historic commercial structures in Coushatta, it is the only one with detailing meriting calling it "Victorian" in style.
