= Thomas House (Martin, Louisiana) =

Historic house in Louisiana, United States

- U.S. National Register of Historic Places
- Location within Louisiana
- Nearest city: Martin, Louisiana
- Coordinates: 32°4′21″N 93°10′51″W
- Area: 1 acre (0.40 ha)
- Built: c.1855
- Architectural style: Log single pen
- NRHP reference No.: 02000038
- Added to NRHP: February 22, 2002

The Thomas House on rural Louisiana Highway 787 near Martin in Red River Parish, Louisiana, is a historic house built around 1855. It was listed on the National Register of Historic Places in 2002.

It is a log house built originally with a single pen, which was expanded by a frame addition later. The original log section is well-preserved, and is of fairly fine work, with squared logs joined by half-dovetail notching.

It is significant as a rare surviving example of domestic log construction by the Scots-Irish/Appalachian Uplanders who settled northern Louisiana in the 1830s.
