= Colombage =

Colombage is a surname. Notable people with the surname include:

- Jayanath Colombage, Sri Lankan flag officer
- Maria Colombage (born 1984), Sri Lankan model
- Priyantha Colombage (born 1966), Sri Lankan film director
- Sachindu Colombage (born 1998), Sri Lankan cricketer
