= Patin House =

- U.S. National Register of Historic Places
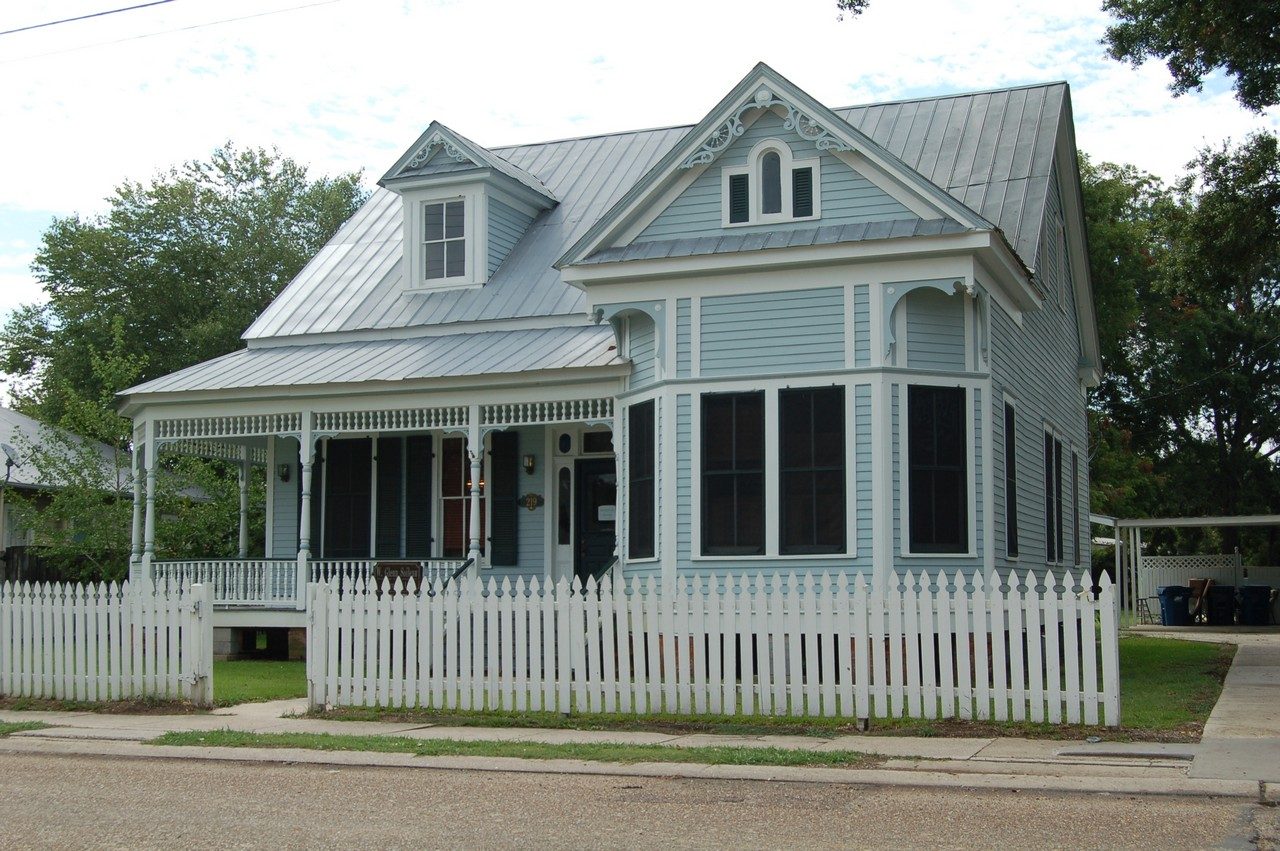

- Location within Louisiana
- Location: 219 W. Bridge St., Breaux Bridge, Louisiana
- Coordinates: 30°16′19″N 91°54′01″W
- Area: less than one acre
- Built: 1895
- Architectural style: Stick/eastlake, Queen Anne
- NRHP reference No.: 91001680
- Added to NRHP: November 13, 1991

The Patin House, at 219 W. Bridge St. in Breaux Bridge, Louisiana, was built in 1895. It was listed on the National Register of Historic Places in 1991.

It includes elements of Stick/eastlake and Queen Anne style.
