= Bossier Parish, Louisiana =

Parish in Louisiana, United States

Coordinates: 32.68°N 93.60°W

Bossier Parish
- Parish
- Parish of Bossier; Paroisse de Bossier (French)
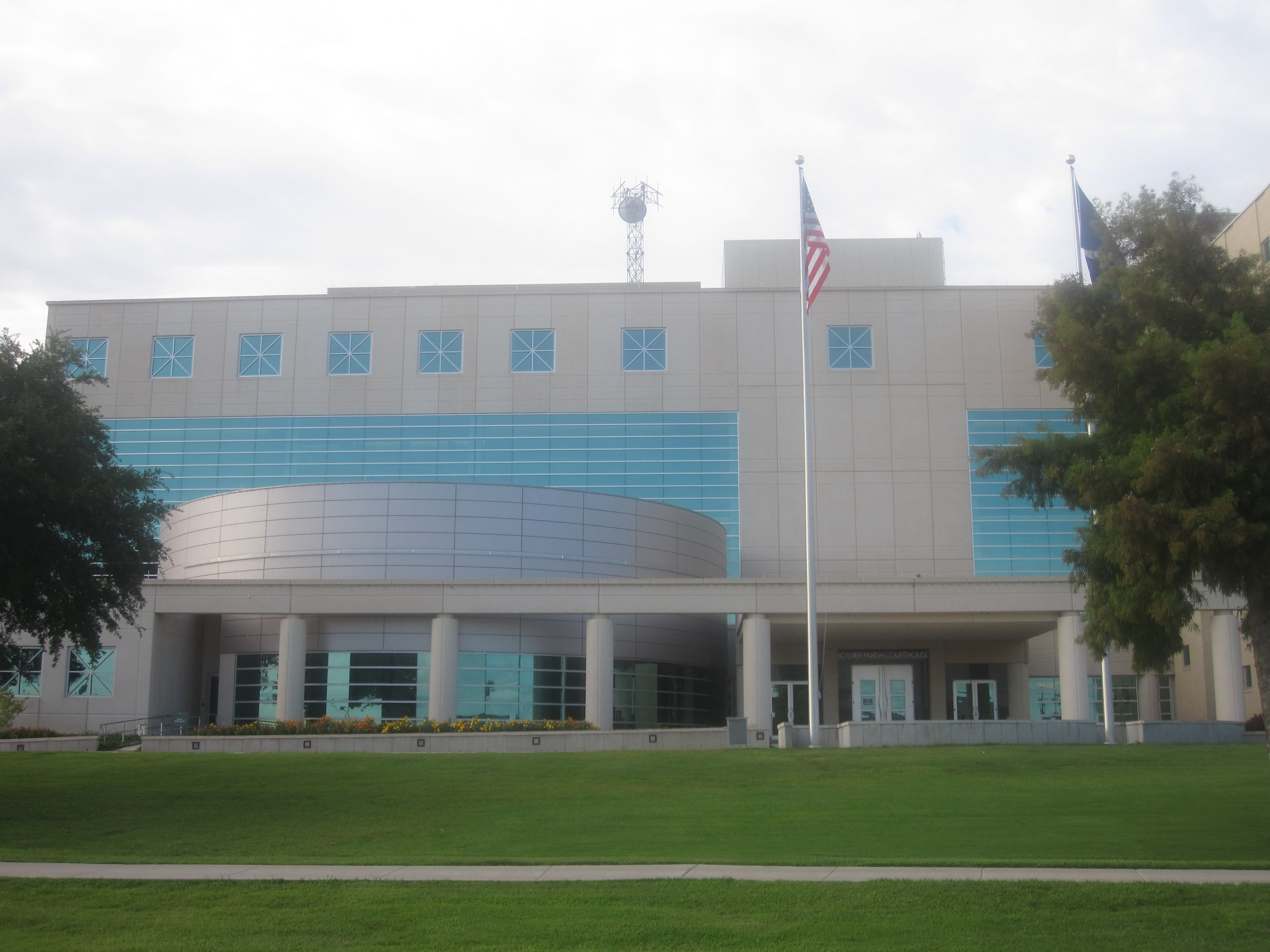
- Renovated Bossier Parish Courthouse in Benton

- Location within the U.S. state of Louisiana

- Louisiana's location within the U.S.
- Country: United States
- State: Louisiana
- Region: North Louisiana
- Founded: February 24, 1843
- Named for: Pierre Bossier
- Parish seat: Benton
- Largest city: Bossier City

Area
  - Total: 867 sq mi (2,250 km^{2})
  - Land: 840 sq mi (2,200 km^{2})
  - Water: 27 sq mi (70 km^{2})
  - percentage: 3.1 sq mi (8.0 km^{2})

Population (2020)
  - Total: 128,746
  - Estimate (2025): 131,867 ▲
  - Density: 150/sq mi (59/km^{2})
- Time zone: UTC-6 (CST)
  - Summer (DST): UTC-5 (CDT)
- Area code: 318
- Congressional district: 4th
- Website: bossierparishla.gov

Bossier Parish (/ˈboʊʒər/ BOH-zhər; French: Paroisse de Bossier [paʁwas də bɔsje]) is a parish located in the northwestern part of the U.S. state of Louisiana. At the 2020 census, the population was 128,746.

The parish seat is Benton. The principal city is Bossier City, which is located east of the Red River and across from the larger city of Shreveport, the seat of Caddo Parish. The parish was formed in 1843 from the western portion of Claiborne Parish. Bossier Parish is part of the Shreveport–Bossier City metropolitan statistical area, the largest metropolitan area in North Louisiana.

Lake Bistineau and Lake Bistineau State Park are included in parts of Bossier and neighboring Webster and Bienville parishes. Loggy Bayou flows south from Lake Bistineau in southern Bossier Parish, traverses western Bienville Parish, and in Red River Parish joins the Red River.

== History ==
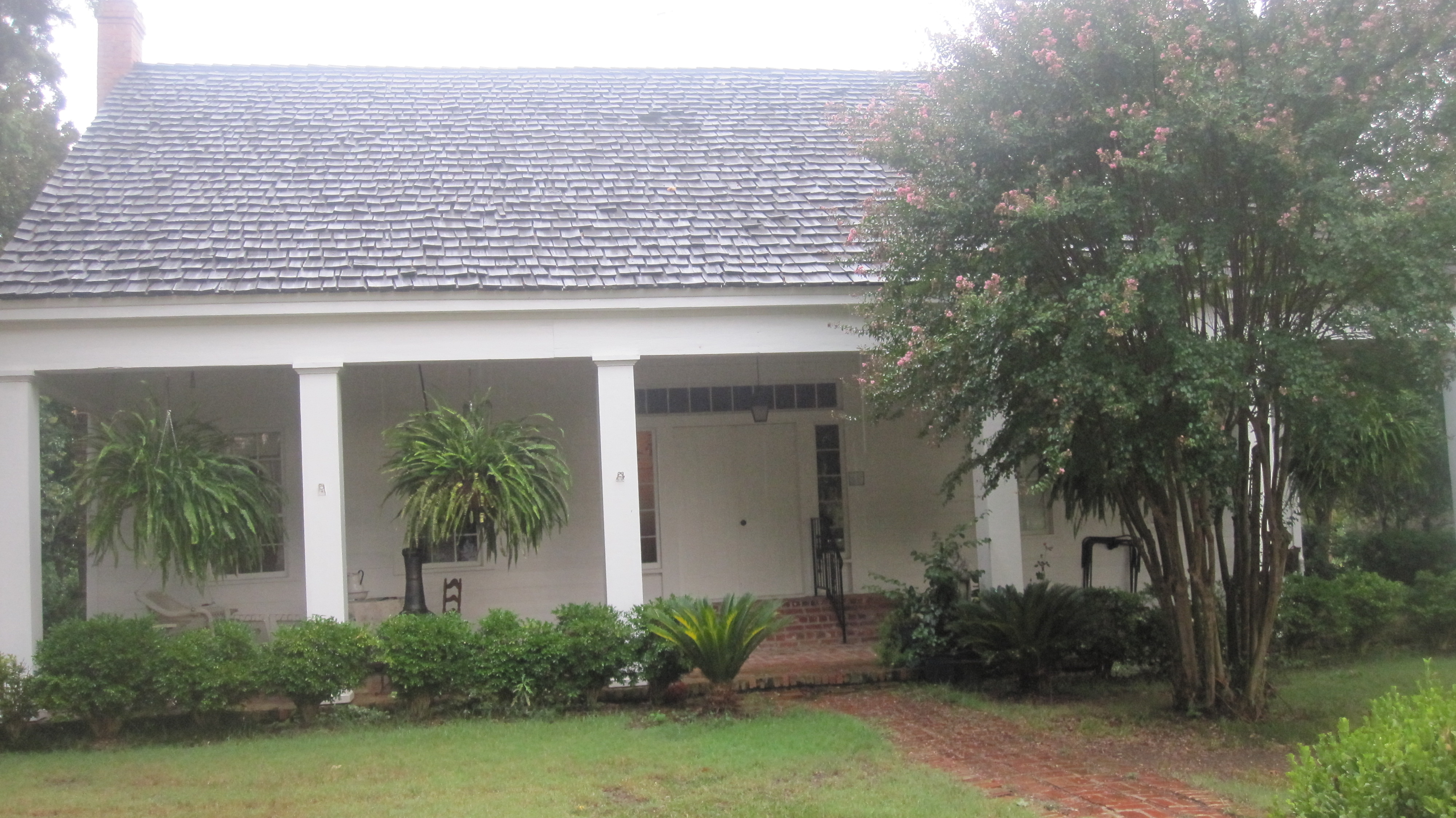
Arnold-Tidwell House near the Cypress Lake recreational area is one of three antebellum homes still standing in Bossier Parish.

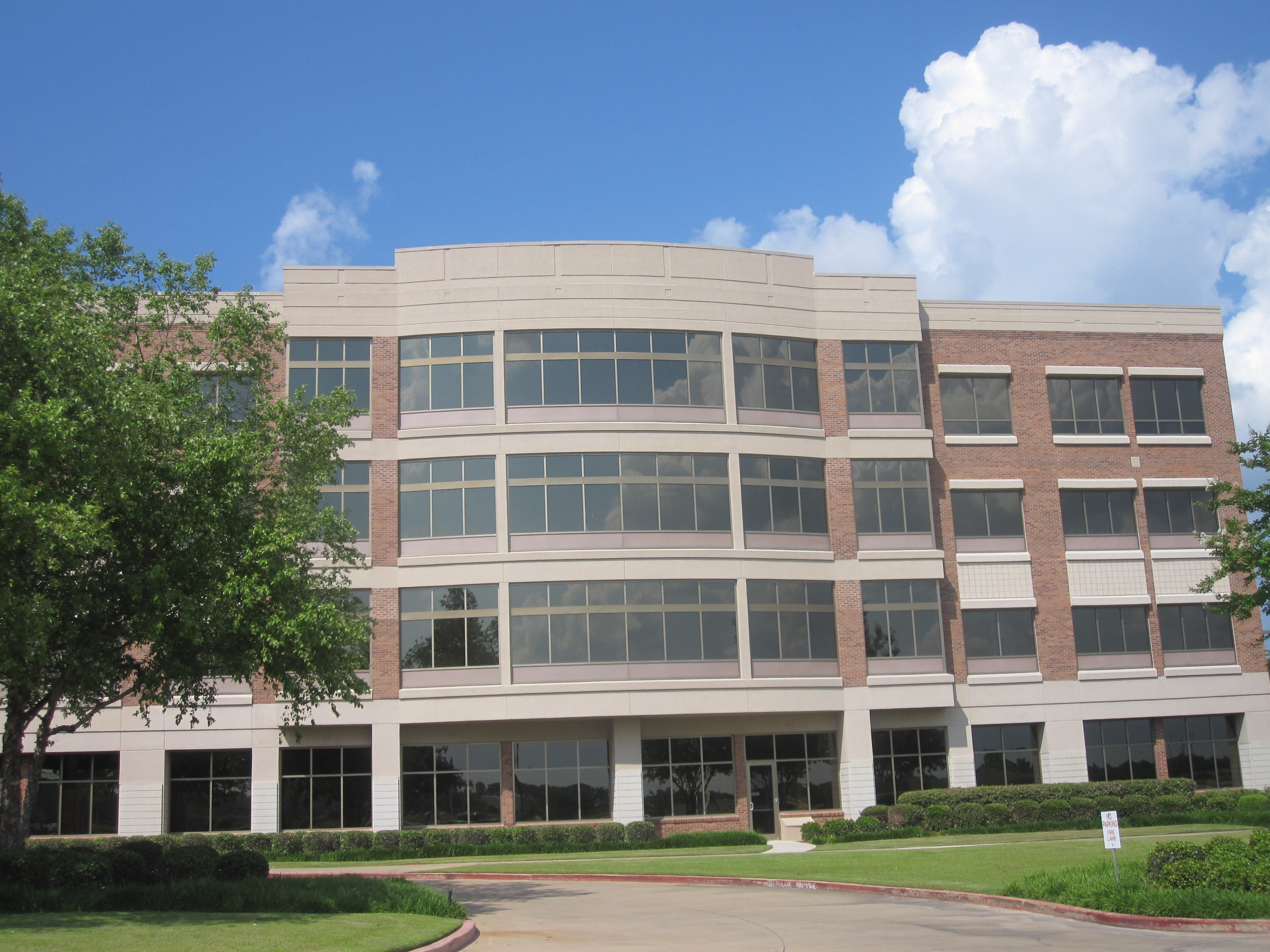
Willis Knighton Hospital in Bossier City serves much of northern Bossier Parish.

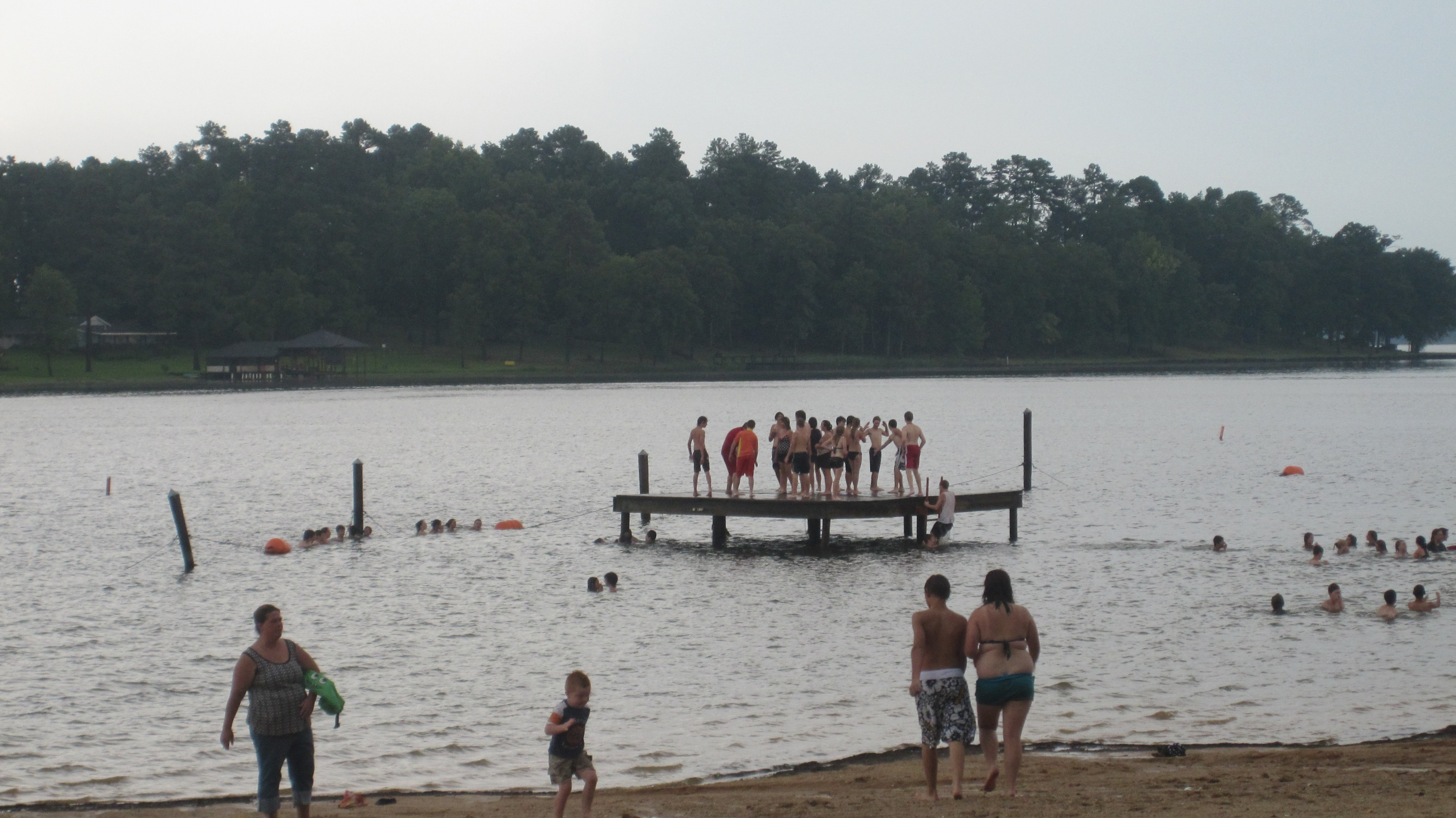
Swimmers at Cypress Lake on a cloudy summer day

Bossier Parish is named for Pierre Bossier, an ethnic French, 19th-century Louisiana state senator and U.S. representative from Natchitoches Parish.

Bossier Parish was spared fighting on its soil during the American Civil War. In July 1861, at the start of the war, the Bossier Parish Police Jury appropriated $35,000 for the benefit of Confederate volunteers and their family members left behind, an amount then considered generous.

After the war, whites used violence and intimidation to maintain dominance over the newly emancipated freedmen. From the end of Reconstruction into the 20th century, violence increased as conservative white Democrats struggled to maintain power over the state. In this period, Bossier Parish had 26 lynchings of African Americans by whites, part of racial terrorism. This was the fifth-highest total of any parish in Louisiana, tied with the total in Iberia Parish in the South of the state. Overall, parishes in northwest Louisiana had the highest rates of lynchings.

== Geography ==
According to the U.S. Census Bureau, the parish has a total area of 867 square miles (2,250 km^{2}), of which 840 square miles (2,200 km^{2}) is land and 27 square miles (70 km^{2}) (3.1%) is water. Four miles east of Bossier City is Barksdale Air Force Base.

=== Major highways ===
- Interstate 20
  - Interstate 220
- Future Interstate 69
- U.S. Highway 71
- U.S. Highway 79 / U.S. Highway 80
- Louisiana Highway 2
- Louisiana Highway 3
- Louisiana Highway 72
- Louisiana Highway 154
- Louisiana Highway 157
- Louisiana Highway 160
- Louisiana Highway 162
- Louisiana Highway 164
- Louisiana Highway 511
- Louisiana Highway 515
- Louisiana Highway 527
- Louisiana Highway 528
- Louisiana Highway 529
- Louisiana Highway 537
- Louisiana Highway 612
- Louisiana Highway 614
- Louisiana Highway 782-2
- Louisiana Highway 3032
- Louisiana Highway 3105
- Louisiana Highway 3227

=== Adjacent counties and parishes ===
- Miller County, Arkansas (northwest)
- Lafayette County, Arkansas (north)
- Webster Parish (east)
- Bienville Parish (southeast)
- Red River Parish (south)
- Caddo Parish (west)

=== National protected area ===
- Red River National Wildlife Refuge (part)

== Communities ==
=== Cities ===
- Bossier City (largest municipality)
- Shreveport (partial)

=== Towns ===
- Benton (parish seat)
- Haughton
- Plain Dealing (smallest municipality)

=== Unincorporated areas ===
==== Census-designated places ====
- Eastwood
- Red Chute

==== Unincorporated communities ====
- Elm Grove
- Fillmore
- Princeton
- Taylortown

== Demographics ==
Historical population
Census	Pop.	Note	%±
1850	6,962		—
1860	11,348		63.0%
1870	12,675		11.7%
1880	16,042		26.6%
1890	20,330		26.7%
1900	24,153		18.8%
1910	21,738		−10.0%
1920	22,266		2.4%
1930	28,388		27.5%
1940	33,162		16.8%
1950	40,139		21.0%
1960	57,622		43.6%
1970	64,519		12.0%
1980	80,721		25.1%
1990	86,088		6.6%
2000	98,310		14.2%
2010	116,979		19.0%
2020	128,746		10.1%
2025 (est.)	131,867	▲	2.4%
U.S. Decennial Census; 1790-1960 1900-1990; 1990-2000 2010

=== 2020 census ===
As of the 2020 census, the parish had a population of 128,746 people, 50,092 households, and 33,963 families. The median age was 36.2 years; 25.5% of residents were under the age of 18, and 14.8% were 65 years of age or older. For every 100 females there were 96.3 males, and for every 100 females age 18 and over there were 93.7 males age 18 and over.

Of the households, 34.9% had children under the age of 18 living in them, 46.6% were married-couple households, 18.7% were households with a male householder and no spouse or partner present, and 28.6% were households with a female householder and no spouse or partner present. About 27.2% of all households were made up of individuals and 10.1% had someone living alone who was 65 years of age or older.

The racial makeup of the parish was 63.0% White, 23.4% Black or African American, 0.6% American Indian and Alaska Native, 1.9% Asian, 0.1% Native Hawaiian and Pacific Islander, 3.8% from some other race, and 7.3% from two or more races. Hispanic or Latino residents of any race comprised 8.0% of the population.

72.8% of residents lived in urban areas, while 27.2% lived in rural areas.

There were 55,237 housing units, of which 9.3% were vacant. Among occupied housing units, 64.1% were owner-occupied and 35.9% were renter-occupied. The homeowner vacancy rate was 1.8% and the rental vacancy rate was 11.3%.

=== Racial and ethnic composition ===
Bossier Parish, Louisiana – Racial and ethnic composition Note: the US Census treats Hispanic/Latino as an ethnic category. This table excludes Latinos from the racial categories and assigns them to a separate category. Hispanics/Latinos may be of any race.
Race / Ethnicity (NH = Non-Hispanic)	Pop 1980	Pop 1990	Pop 2000	Pop 2010	Pop 2020	% 1980	% 1990	% 2000	% 2010	% 2020
White alone (NH)	63,127	65,812	71,701	80,991	78,982	78.20%	76.45%	72.93%	69.24%	61.35%
Black or African American alone (NH)	15,024	17,301	20,347	24,245	29,868	18.61%	20.10%	20.70%	20.73%	23.20%
Native American or Alaska Native alone (NH)	188	274	440	533	573	0.23%	0.32%	0.45%	0.46%	0.45%
Asian alone (NH)	416	867	1,216	1,873	2,341	0.52%	1.01%	1.24%	1.60%	1.82%
Native Hawaiian or Pacific Islander alone (NH)	x	x	79	154	113	x	x	0.08%	0.13%	0.09%
Other race alone (NH)	256	35	94	128	480	0.32%	0.04%	0.10%	0.11%	0.37%
Mixed race or Multiracial (NH)	x	x	1,370	2,029	6,152	x	x	1.39%	1.73%	4.78%
Hispanic or Latino (any race)	1,710	1,799	3,063	7,026	10,237	2.12%	2.09%	3.12%	6.01%	7.95%
Total	80,721	86,088	98,310	116,979	128,746	100.00%	100.00%	100.00%	100.00%	100.00%

=== 2010 census ===
According to the 2010 U.S. census, there were 116,979 people, 62,000 households, and 37,500 families residing in the parish. The population density was 142 inhabitants per square mile (55/km^{2}). There were 49,000 housing units at an average density of 48 per square mile (19/km^{2}).

The racial makeup of the parish in 2010 was 70.66% White, 18.52% Black or African American, 0.82% Native American, 2.18% Asian, 0.18% Pacific Islander, 1.00% from other races, and 1.65% from two or more races; 8.15% of the population were Hispanic or Latino American of any race.

== Law, government and politics ==
Bossier Parish is governed by a 12-member elected body: the Bossier Parish Police Jury (which is equivalent to a county commission in other states). Members are elected from single-member districts.The current members of the police jury are:

- District 1 - Bob Brotherton
- District 2 - Glenn Benton
- District 3 - Philip Rogers
- District 4 - John Ed Jordan
- District 5 - Julianna Parks
- District 6 - Chris Marsiglia
- District 7 - Jimmy Cochran
- District 8 - Douglas E. Rimmer
- District 9 - Charles Gray
- District 10 - Jerome Darby
- District 11 - Tom Salzer
- District 12 - Paul M. "Mac" Plummer

Since the late 20th century, the non-Hispanic white population of the parish has shifted from the Democratic to the Republican Party (as have most conservative whites in Louisiana and other Southern U.S. states). The state was a one-party state dominated by the Democratic Party from the period after the turn of the century (when most Blacks were disenfranchised in Louisiana) to the mid-20th century.

Bossier Parish has since reliably voted for Republican candidates in most contested U.S. presidential elections. Since 1952, George Wallace, the former governor of Alabama who ran in 1968 on the American Independent Party ticket, has been the only non-Republican to carry Bossier Parish.

In 2008, U.S. Senator John McCain of Arizona won in Bossier Parish with 32,713 votes (71.4 percent) over Democrat Barack H. Obama of Illinois, who received 12,703 votes (27.8 percent). In 2012, Mitt Romney polled 34,988 votes (72 percent) in Bossier Parish (2,275 more ballots than McCain drew in 2008). President Obama won 12,956 (26.6) of the votes in Bossier Parish.

United States presidential election results for Bossier Parish, Louisiana
Year	Republican		Democratic		Third party(ies)	
Year	No.	%	No.	%	No.	%
1912	6	1.23%	427	87.68%	54	11.09%
1916	9	1.32%	675	98.68%	0	0.00%
1920	44	5.68%	731	94.32%	0	0.00%
1924	48	5.84%	751	91.36%	23	2.80%
1928	225	15.93%	1,187	84.07%	0	0.00%
1932	56	2.49%	2,191	97.51%	0	0.00%
1936	193	8.89%	1,975	91.01%	2	0.09%
1940	275	8.23%	3,045	91.17%	20	0.60%
1944	622	20.37%	2,430	79.59%	1	0.03%
1948	338	8.72%	1,147	29.59%	2,391	61.69%
1952	3,677	57.81%	2,683	42.19%	0	0.00%
1956	3,107	48.97%	1,954	30.80%	1,284	20.24%
1960	3,429	39.32%	2,198	25.21%	3,093	35.47%
1964	9,822	83.53%	1,937	16.47%	0	0.00%
1968	3,745	23.74%	2,782	17.63%	9,249	58.63%
1972	12,856	78.63%	2,914	17.82%	580	3.55%
1976	12,132	59.22%	8,062	39.35%	293	1.43%
1980	16,515	62.70%	9,377	35.60%	447	1.70%
1984	22,638	76.01%	7,006	23.52%	138	0.46%
1988	20,807	69.16%	9,035	30.03%	243	0.81%
1992	15,628	47.64%	11,313	34.49%	5,860	17.87%
1996	16,852	47.63%	15,504	43.82%	3,026	8.55%
2000	23,224	64.66%	11,933	33.23%	758	2.11%
2004	30,040	70.34%	12,317	28.84%	348	0.81%
2008	32,713	71.37%	12,703	27.71%	419	0.91%
2012	34,988	72.05%	12,956	26.68%	618	1.27%
2016	35,474	71.16%	12,641	25.36%	1,733	3.48%
2020	38,074	69.66%	15,662	28.66%	919	1.68%
2024	37,105	71.04%	14,467	27.70%	660	1.26%

== National Guard ==
The 165th CSS (Combat Service Support) Battalion is headquartered in Bossier City. This unit was deployed to Iraq in 2008. Also located in Bossier City is the 156TH Army Band which deployed as part of the 256th Infantry Brigade in 2010 to Iraq.

== Education ==
Bossier Parish School Board operates public schools in the parish.

It is in the service areas of Bossier Parish Community College and Northwest Louisiana Technical Community College.

== Notable people ==
- William Benton Boggs (1854–1922), first mayor of Plain Dealing and former member of the Louisiana House of Representatives and the Louisiana State Senate
- Roy A. Burrell, state representative from District 2 (Caddo and Bossier parishes) since 2004
- E. S. Dortch, planter and politician and last surviving (1943) Bossier Parish veteran of the Confederate States Army
- George Dement, former mayor of Bossier City and innkeeper and restaurateur
- Jack Favor, a rodeo star, was falsely imprisoned in 1967 at the Louisiana State Penitentiary for the murders of Mr. and Mrs. W. H. Richey.
- Ryan Gatti, lawyer and former state senator for District 36
- Booker T, American professional wrestler and promoter.
- Mike Johnson, Speaker of the U.S. House of Representatives; constitutional attorney in Benton
- Jerry Miculek, American professional speed and competition shooter known for his 20 world records; resides in Princeton
- Jimmy Boyd, former Louisiana State Representative
- Justin Wells, singer-songwriter
- Joe Waggonner, former U.S. Representative
- Willie Waggonner, former sheriff of Bossier Parish
- Judi Ann Mason, television writer, producer, and playwright
- Adam Bass, current state senator for Louisiana's 36th State Senate district.
- Harmonica Fats, blues harmonica player
- Campbell B. Hodges, former U.S. Army general and president of Louisiana State University
- Ford E. Stinson, U.S. Army officer and former Louisiana State Representative
- Vol Dooley, controversial former sheriff of Bossier Parish
- William Clark Hughes, former Speaker of the Louisiana House of Representatives
- Billie Jean Horton, former country-music singer-songwriter and promoter who was married to Hank Williams and Johnny Horton
- Greg Stumon, former professional football player in the Canadian Football League
- Jared Leto, actor and singer
- Shannon Leto, drummer of rock band Thirty Seconds to Mars
- Riley Stewart, former professional baseball pitcher in the Negro Leagues
- Henry Warren Ogden, former member of the United States House of Representatives and the Louisiana House of Representatives
- Myron Baker, former professional football player in the NFL
- Joe Delaney, former professional football player in the NFL and posthumous recipient of the Presidential Citizen's Medal
- Jesse Winchester, American-Canadian musician and songwriter
- Bobby Smith, former professional football defensive back in the NFL
- Brad Pye, Jr., sports journalist, broadcaster, and activist
- Willa Mae Sudduth, a founder of the Coalition of Labor Union Women
- Dodie Horton, current Louisiana State Representative
- Dak Prescott, current professional football quarterback in the NFL
- Keith Lehr, poker player and two-time World Series of Poker bracelet winner
- John A. Franks, businessman and racehorse owner and breeder
- V. V. Whittington, banker and former Louisiana State Senator
- Frank Bradley, former professional baseball pitcher in the Negro Leagues
- Robert C. Smith, former political scientist and professor at San Francisco State University
- David Houston, country music singer
- Jack Clayton, former collegiate football, baseball, and basketball coach

== See also ==
- National Register of Historic Places listings in Bossier Parish, Louisiana
- Bossier Press-Tribune
