= Plain Dealing High School =

Location
- 300 East Vance Street; Plain Dealing, Bossier Parish, Louisiana 71064; United States; 32.90989°N 93.69912°W

Information
- Type: Public
- Established: 1907
- School district: Bossier Parish School Board
- Principal: Jason Edwards
- Staff: 36.70 (FTE)
- Grades: PK–12
- Enrollment: 276 (2023-24)
- Student to teacher ratio: 7.52
- Colors: Red and Black
- Team name: Lions
- Yearbook: Au Roarer
- Website: pdmhs.bossierschools.org

Plain Dealing High School, formerly Plain Dealing Middle/High School and Louisiana New Tech at Plain Dealing, is public school in Plain Dealing, Louisiana, United States. It is a part of Bossier Parish Schools.

It covers grades Pre-Kindergarten through 12.

== History ==
The cornerstone of the school building was laid at the site of the original wooden building on December 19, 1888. At the time, PDHS was known as Pioneer High School. The school would not take on the name "Plain Dealing High School" until around 1902. The school graduated its first official class in 1908, the centennial of which was celebrated in May 1988. The school's first brick structure was erected in 1921.

The school's first principal, Joseph E. Johnston, was the great-grandfather of former Louisiana Senator J. Bennett Johnston.

The school yearbook, Au Roarer, has been published annually since 1948.

During Jim Crow segregation of public schools, black educator Carrie Martin established a school for black students off Highway 3 south of downtown Plain Dealing, which would eventually be named for her. Following desegregation of Louisiana public schools in 1970, Carrie Martin School would be combined with Plain Dealing High School, with PDHS retaining its campus, school colors, and mascot. Carrie Martin School would become Plain Dealing Elementary School until it was renamed for Martin in 2003.

In 2009, the Bossier Parish School Board voted to alter the school's academic format and changed the school's name to "Louisiana New Tech at Plain Dealing."

In 2017 the district announced that it will merge Martin Elementary into Plain Dealing High, and stop using the former elementary facility.

== Athletics ==
The Plain Dealing Lions compete in District 1-1A of the Louisiana High School Athletic Association.

- Football
- Basketball (Boys and Girls)
- Softball
- Baseball
- Track

== Notable alumni ==
- Greg Stumon, 1987 Defensive Player of the Year, Canadian Football League
- Joe Waggonner, United States Congressman for Louisiana's 4th congressional district (1961–1979)
- Willie Waggonner, sheriff of Bossier Parish, Louisiana
