= 1976 United States presidential election in Louisiana =

- November 2, 1976

Nominee	Jimmy Carter	Gerald Ford
Party	Democratic	Republican
Home state	Georgia	Michigan
Running mate	Walter Mondale	Bob Dole
Electoral vote	10	0
Popular vote	661,365	587,446
Percentage	51.73%	45.95%
Parish results
Carter
40–50%
50–60%
60–70%
70–80%
Ford
40–50%
50–60%
60–70%
President before election
Gerald Ford
Republican
Elected President
Jimmy Carter
Democratic

The 1976 United States presidential election in Louisiana took place on November 2, 1976, as part of the 1976 United States presidential election. State voters chose ten representatives, or electors, to the Electoral College, who voted for president and vice president.

Louisiana was won by Jimmy Carter (D–Georgia), with 51.73% of the popular vote. Carter defeated incumbent President Gerald Ford (R–Michigan), who finished with 45.95% of the popular vote. No third-party candidate amounted to 1% of the vote; American Party candidate Lester Maddox came the closest with 0.79%.

Jimmy Carter went on to become the 39th president of the United States. As of the 2024 presidential election, this is the last election in which Grant Parish and West Carroll Parish voted for a Democratic presidential candidate.

== Campaign ==
Among white voters, 57% supported Ford while 40% supported Carter.

== Results ==
1976 United States presidential election in Louisiana
Party	Candidate	Votes	%
Democratic	Jimmy Carter	661,365	51.73%
Republican	Gerald Ford (inc.)	587,446	45.95%
American	Lester Maddox	10,058	0.79%
Communist	Gus Hall	7,417	0.58%
Nomination	Eugene McCarthy	6,588	0.52%
Libertarian	Roger MacBride	3,325	0.26%
Socialist Workers	Peter Camejo	2,240	0.18%
Total votes		1,278,439	100%

=== Results by parish ===
Parish	Jimmy Carter Democratic		Gerald Ford Republican		Lester Maddox American		Gus Hall Communist		Eugene McCarthy Nominated		Various candidates Other parties		Margin		Total votes cast
Parish	#	%	#	%	#	%	#	%	#	%	#	%	#	%	Total votes cast
Acadia	10,814	61.28%	6,296	35.68%	105	0.59%	206	1.17%	96	0.54%	131	0.74%	4,518	25.60%	17,648
Allen	5,373	70.02%	2,080	27.11%	80	1.04%	68	0.89%	29	0.38%	43	0.56%	3,293	42.91%	7,673
Ascension	9,100	65.10%	4,435	31.73%	205	1.47%	86	0.62%	75	0.54%	77	0.55%	4,665	33.37%	13,978
Assumption	4,401	57.07%	3,117	40.42%	62	0.80%	58	0.75%	28	0.36%	45	0.58%	1,284	16.65%	7,711
Avoyelles	8,104	60.86%	4,574	34.35%	396	2.97%	123	0.92%	46	0.35%	72	0.54%	3,530	26.51%	13,315
Beauregard	5,322	60.57%	3,196	36.38%	79	0.90%	77	0.88%	54	0.61%	58	0.66%	2,126	24.19%	8,786
Bienville	3,402	56.60%	2,499	41.57%	40	0.67%	37	0.62%	20	0.33%	13	0.22%	903	15.03%	6,011
Bossier	8,062	39.35%	12,132	59.22%	99	0.48%	74	0.36%	52	0.25%	68	0.33%	-4,070	-19.87%	20,487
Caddo	30,593	41.15%	42,627	57.34%	342	0.46%	219	0.29%	349	0.47%	210	0.28%	-12,034	-16.19%	74,340
Calcasieu	33,980	64.61%	17,485	33.24%	326	0.62%	284	0.54%	267	0.51%	253	0.48%	16,495	31.37%	52,595
Caldwell	1,830	48.08%	1,890	49.66%	46	1.21%	25	0.66%	7	0.18%	8	0.21%	-60	-1.58%	3,806
Cameron	2,432	72.86%	819	24.54%	16	0.48%	34	1.02%	10	0.30%	27	0.81%	1,613	48.32%	3,338
Catahoula	2,547	53.43%	2,086	43.76%	64	1.34%	33	0.69%	14	0.29%	23	0.48%	461	9.67%	4,767
Claiborne	2,891	46.58%	3,216	51.81%	46	0.74%	17	0.27%	13	0.21%	24	0.39%	-325	-5.23%	6,207
Concordia	3,892	49.19%	3,849	48.65%	84	1.06%	37	0.47%	15	0.19%	35	0.44%	43	0.54%	7,912
DeSoto	4,630	55.46%	3,601	43.14%	53	0.63%	31	0.37%	22	0.26%	11	0.13%	1,029	12.32%	8,348
East Baton Rouge	49,956	48.11%	51,655	49.75%	577	0.56%	529	0.51%	563	0.54%	547	0.53%	-1,699	-1.64%	103,827
East Carroll	2,367	56.93%	1,681	40.43%	44	1.06%	34	0.82%	18	0.43%	14	0.34%	686	16.50%	4,158
East Feliciana	3,485	65.47%	1,668	31.34%	58	1.09%	42	0.79%	29	0.54%	41	0.77%	1,817	34.13%	5,323
Evangeline	7,578	65.56%	3,715	32.14%	103	0.89%	79	0.68%	39	0.34%	44	0.38%	3,863	33.42%	11,558
Franklin	3,824	47.85%	3,947	49.39%	96	1.20%	63	0.79%	21	0.26%	40	0.50%	-123	-1.54%	7,991
Grant	3,670	59.81%	2,280	37.16%	80	1.30%	47	0.77%	26	0.42%	33	0.54%	1,390	22.65%	6,136
Iberia	9,984	48.11%	10,392	50.07%	167	0.80%	73	0.35%	75	0.36%	62	0.30%	-408	-1.96%	20,753
Iberville	7,254	63.69%	3,822	33.56%	87	0.76%	113	0.99%	54	0.47%	59	0.52%	3,432	30.13%	11,389
Jackson	3,605	51.06%	3,310	46.88%	71	1.01%	30	0.42%	17	0.24%	27	0.38%	295	4.18%	7,060
Jefferson	53,257	41.75%	71,787	56.28%	786	0.62%	517	0.41%	685	0.54%	528	0.41%	-18,530	-14.53%	127,560
Jefferson Davis	6,376	62.04%	3,603	35.06%	76	0.74%	102	0.99%	55	0.54%	66	0.64%	2,773	26.98%	10,278
Lafayette	19,918	45.58%	22,805	52.19%	343	0.78%	219	0.50%	225	0.51%	189	0.43%	-2,887	-6.61%	43,699
Lafourche	14,131	53.80%	11,434	43.53%	267	1.02%	185	0.70%	111	0.42%	138	0.53%	2,697	10.27%	26,266
LaSalle	2,961	46.93%	3,161	50.10%	88	1.39%	51	0.81%	19	0.30%	30	0.48%	-200	-3.17%	6,310
Lincoln	4,971	41.53%	6,828	57.05%	84	0.70%	30	0.25%	20	0.17%	36	0.30%	-1,857	-15.52%	11,969
Livingston	9,875	62.13%	5,555	34.95%	156	0.98%	131	0.82%	79	0.50%	99	0.62%	4,320	27.18%	15,895
Madison	4,933	69.21%	2,096	29.41%	58	0.81%	21	0.29%	11	0.15%	9	0.13%	2,837	39.80%	7,128
Morehouse	4,017	41.45%	5,418	55.90%	157	1.62%	48	0.50%	19	0.20%	33	0.34%	-1,401	-14.45%	9,692
Natchitoches	6,692	53.89%	5,248	42.26%	308	2.48%	73	0.59%	40	0.32%	56	0.45%	1,444	11.63%	12,417
Orleans	93,130	55.33%	70,925	42.14%	789	0.47%	1,234	0.73%	1,407	0.84%	819	0.49%	22,205	13.19%	168,304
Ouachita	15,738	38.91%	24,082	59.53%	342	0.85%	110	0.27%	106	0.26%	73	0.18%	-8,344	-20.62%	40,451
Plaquemines	2,614	29.52%	6,052	68.35%	33	0.37%	38	0.43%	81	0.91%	37	0.42%	-3,438	-38.83%	8,855
Pointe Coupee	5,147	65.35%	2,567	32.59%	68	0.86%	43	0.55%	22	0.28%	29	0.37%	2,580	32.76%	7,876
Rapides	20,851	53.10%	17,766	45.25%	343	0.87%	102	0.26%	121	0.31%	81	0.21%	3,085	7.85%	39,264
Red River	1,906	51.42%	1,728	46.61%	40	1.08%	11	0.30%	8	0.22%	14	0.38%	178	4.81%	3,707
Richland	3,495	48.07%	3,630	49.93%	73	1.00%	37	0.51%	18	0.25%	17	0.23%	-135	-1.86%	7,270
Sabine	4,555	54.54%	3,531	42.28%	120	1.44%	68	0.81%	23	0.28%	54	0.65%	1,024	12.26%	8,351
St. Bernard	12,969	48.92%	12,707	47.94%	171	0.65%	178	0.67%	373	1.41%	110	0.41%	262	0.98%	26,508
St. Charles	6,872	59.73%	4,270	37.11%	92	0.80%	127	1.10%	60	0.52%	84	0.73%	2,602	22.62%	11,505
St. Helena	2,622	69.22%	1,046	27.61%	39	1.03%	31	0.82%	22	0.58%	28	0.74%	1,576	41.61%	3,788
St. James	4,531	60.69%	2,751	36.85%	47	0.63%	67	0.90%	34	0.46%	36	0.48%	1,780	23.84%	7,466
St. John the Baptist	5,700	59.32%	3,597	37.43%	85	0.88%	112	1.17%	50	0.52%	65	0.68%	2,103	21.89%	9,609
St. Landry	15,613	59.49%	9,956	37.94%	185	0.70%	234	0.89%	128	0.49%	127	0.48%	5,657	21.55%	26,243
St. Martin	7,992	64.28%	4,112	33.07%	147	1.18%	91	0.73%	43	0.35%	48	0.39%	3,880	31.21%	12,433
St. Mary	9,401	50.25%	8,919	47.67%	142	0.76%	103	0.55%	83	0.44%	60	0.32%	482	2.58%	18,708
St. Tammany	14,691	46.79%	15,822	50.39%	319	1.02%	158	0.50%	256	0.82%	153	0.49%	-1,131	-3.60%	31,399
Tangipahoa	14,432	59.36%	9,242	38.02%	199	0.82%	179	0.74%	131	0.54%	128	0.53%	5,190	21.34%	24,311
Tensas	2,081	56.60%	1,553	42.24%	24	0.65%	8	0.22%	8	0.22%	3	0.08%	528	14.36%	3,677
Terrebonne	10,627	43.76%	12,895	53.11%	317	1.31%	160	0.66%	154	0.63%	129	0.53%	-2,268	-9.35%	24,282
Union	3,600	45.54%	4,139	52.36%	77	0.97%	42	0.53%	19	0.24%	28	0.35%	-539	-6.82%	7,905
Vermilion	11,246	63.00%	6,133	34.36%	162	0.91%	162	0.91%	66	0.37%	81	0.45%	5,113	28.64%	17,850
Vernon	6,202	59.26%	3,970	37.94%	156	1.49%	76	0.73%	29	0.28%	32	0.31%	2,232	21.32%	10,465
Washington	10,000	62.22%	5,677	35.32%	151	0.94%	112	0.70%	62	0.39%	71	0.44%	4,323	26.90%	16,073
Webster	7,286	48.52%	7,550	50.28%	82	0.55%	35	0.23%	27	0.18%	37	0.25%	-264	-1.76%	15,017
West Baton Rouge	3,809	64.73%	1,913	32.51%	54	0.92%	49	0.83%	25	0.42%	34	0.58%	1,896	32.22%	5,884
West Carroll	2,595	50.76%	2,407	47.09%	70	1.37%	19	0.37%	10	0.20%	11	0.22%	188	3.67%	5,112
West Feliciana	1,890	64.59%	990	33.83%	21	0.72%	10	0.34%	8	0.27%	7	0.24%	900	30.76%	2,926
Winn	3,543	51.43%	3,209	46.58%	81	1.18%	25	0.36%	11	0.16%	20	0.29%	334	4.85%	6,889
Totals	661,365	51.73%	587,446	45.95%	10,058	0.79%	7,417	0.58%	6,588	0.52%	5,565	0.44%	73,919	5.78%	1,278,439

==== Parishes that flipped from Republican to Democratic ====
- Allen
- Avoyelles
- Acadia
- Catahoula
- Concordia
- Evangeline
- East Carroll
- Iberville
- Iberia
- Jackson
- Lafourche
- Madison
- Orleans
- Rapides
- Pointe Coupee
- St. Helena
- St. James
- St. Bernard
- Vermilion
- West Baton Rouge
- West Carroll
- Winn
- Ascension
- Assumption
- Beauregard
- Bienville
- Calcasieu
- Cameron
- DeSoto
- East Feliciana
- Livingston
- Jefferson Davis
- Natchitoches
- Red River
- Sabine
- St. Charles
- St. John the Baptist
- St. Landry
- St. Martin
- St. Mary
- Tangipahoa
- Tensas
- Vernon
- Washington

=== Results by congressional district ===
Carter won 5 of the state's 8 congressional districts, including one which elected a Republican, while Ford won the remaining 3, including 2 which elected Democrats.

District	Carter	Ford	Representative
1st	51.3%	48.7%	F. Edward Hébert
1st	51.3%	48.7%	Richard A. Tonry
2nd	55.7%	44.3%	Lindy Boggs
3rd	45.4%	54.6%	Dave Treen
4th	45.8%	54.2%	Joe Waggoner
5th	49.1%	50.9%	Otto Passman
5th	49.1%	50.9%	Jerry Huckaby
6th	54.7%	45.3%	Henson Moore
7th	60.7%	39.3%	John Breaux
8th	61.6%	38.4%	Gillis William Long

== See also ==
- United States presidential elections in Louisiana

== Works cited ==
- Black, Earl; Black, Merle (1992). The Vital South: How Presidents Are Elected. Harvard University Press. ISBN 0674941306.
