= Walter O. Bigby =

American judge and politician

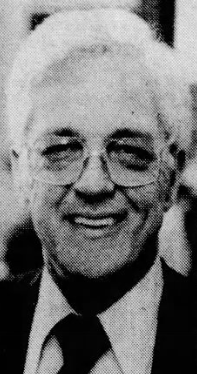
- Bigby in 1976

Member of the Louisiana House of Representatives
- In office 1968–1979
- Preceded by: Ford E. Stinson
- Succeeded by: Robert R. Adley

Judge of the Louisiana Court Appeal for the Second Circuit
- In office 1979–1980

Personal details
- Born: Walter Oliver Bigby; April 10, 1927 Vernon Parish, Louisiana, U.S.
- Died: January 2, 1980 (aged 52) Bossier City, Louisiana, U.S.
- Party: Democratic
- Relatives: V. V. Whittington (father-in-law)
- Education: Louisiana State University
- Occupation: Judge

Walter Oliver Bigby (April 10, 1927 – January 2, 1980), nicknamed "Dean of the House", was an American judge and politician. A member of the Democratic Party, he served in the Louisiana House of Representatives from 1968 to 1979 and as a judge of the Louisiana Court Appeal for the Second Circuit from 1979 to 1980.

== Life and career ==
Bigby was born in Vernon Parish, Louisiana, the son of Harvey Bigby and Ethel Swindle. He attended Benton High School, graduating in 1944. After graduating, he served in the United States Navy, which after his discharge, he attended Louisiana State University, earning his Juris Doctor degree in 1952.

Bigby served in the Louisiana House of Representatives from 1968 until his resignation in 1979. After resigning from the House, he served as judge of the Louisiana Court Appeal for the Second Circuit from 1979 to 1980.

== Death ==
Bigby died on January 2, 1980, of lung cancer at the Bossier City General Hospital in Bossier City, Louisiana, at the age of 52.
