= Justice Watkins =

Justice Watkins may refer to:

- Lynn B. Watkins(1836–1901), justice of the Louisiana Supreme Court from 1886 to 1901
- Samuel Watkins (judge) (fl. 1700s), chief justice of the Leeward Islands in 1706, and from 1716 to c. 1742
- Tasker Watkins (1918–2007), Lord Justice of Appeal and deputy Lord Chief Justice of England and Wales

== See also ==
- Judge Watkins (disambiguation)
