= Benton Middle School (disambiguation) =

Benton Middle School may refer to any of the following institutions in the United States:

- Benton Middle School, in Benton, Kentucky
- Benton Middle School, in Benton, Louisiana
- Benton Middle School, in Prince William County, Virginia
