= Parkway High School (Louisiana) =

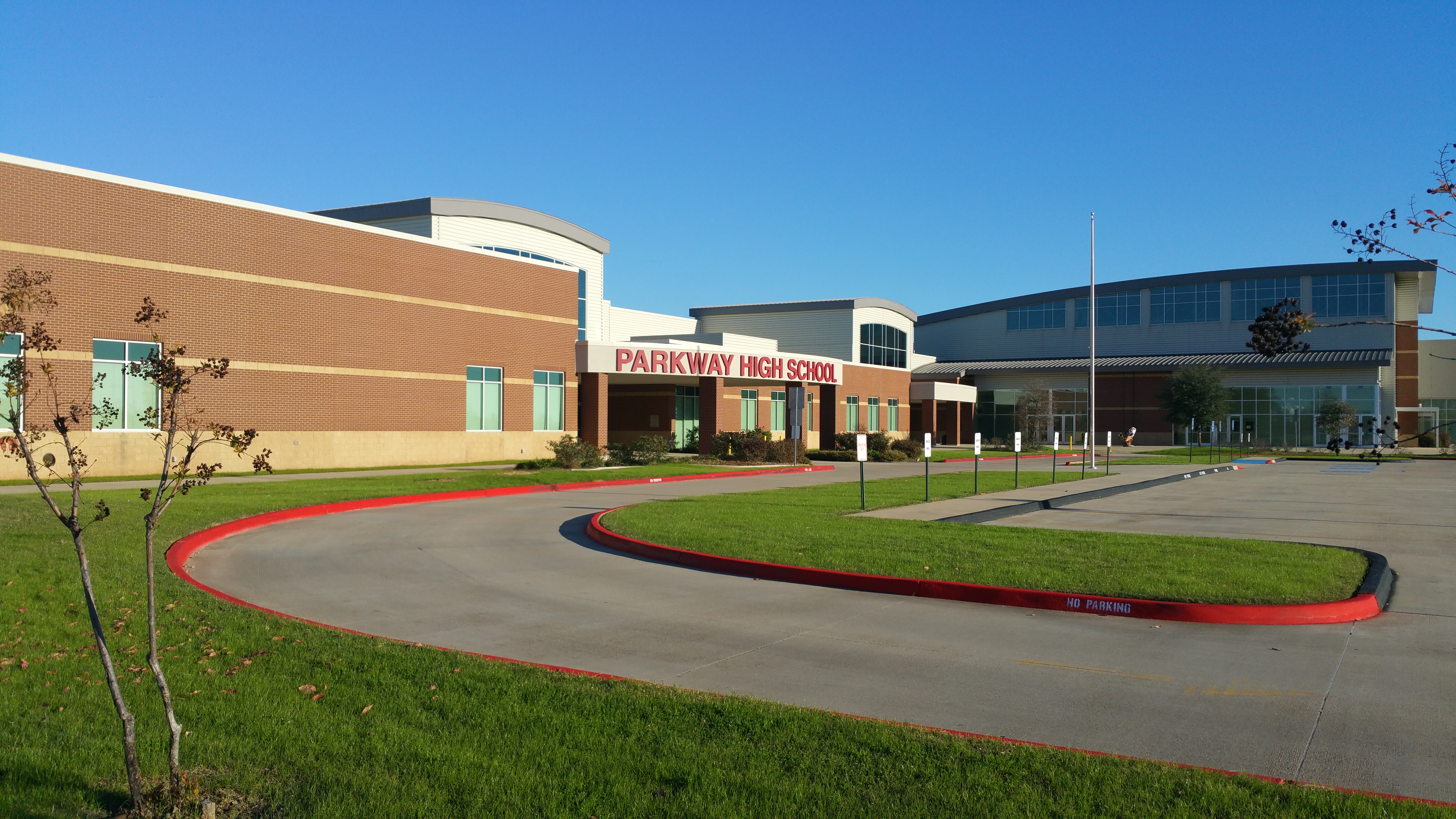

Location
- 2010 Colleen Drive; Bossier City address, Bossier Parish, Louisiana 71112; United States; 32°26′03″N 93°38′41″W

Information
- Type: Public high school
- Motto: Present, Respectful, On-task, Well-behaved, Leaders (PROWL)
- Established: 1968; 58 years ago
- School district: Bossier Parish School Board
- Principal: Steven Vrbka
- Teaching staff: 78.00 (on an FTE basis)
- Grades: 9–12
- Enrollment: 1,349 (2023–2024)
- Student to teacher ratio: 17.29
- Schedule type: Block
- Colors: Red, black, and white
- Athletics conference: LHSAA
- Mascot: Panther
- Nickname: Panthers
- Rivals: Airline High School,
- Yearbook: Superbia Pardi
- Website: parkway.bossierschools.org

Parkway High School is a class 5A public high school located in south bossier (SOBO) of Bossier City, Louisiana, United States. The school is under the directory of the Bossier Parish School Board, and is currently under the administration of Principal Steven Vrbka. Parkway was ranked as a "Top Gains School" by the Louisiana Department of Education in 2012.

Alongside the main campus, the school operates property at the Preston Crownover Stadium, which serves as the school's main athletics facility. The school is partnered with Bossier Parish Community College and the Bossier Parish School for Technology and Innovative Learning to provide collegiate-level dual enrollment courses and vocational courses.

== History ==
Parkway High School began as a junior high school in 1963 and became a high school beginning with the freshman class of 1968. The original school was on Panther Drive, north of the current campus. The school moved to their new campus on Colleen Drive during the 2009–2010 school year. After the 2015–2016 school year, principal Nichole E. Bourgeois Ed.D. was promoted to the position of assistant superintendent, and vice principal Lorenza Baker was transferred to Rusheon Middle School, where he took on the role of principal. Waylon Bates, former principal of Haughton Middle School, took over as principal of Parkway in the 2016–2017 school year with Justin James taking the vice principal position left vacant by Baker.

== Activities and student life ==
Parkway High School has a wide range of extracurricular activities such as its nearly 200 member band, The Pride of Pantherland. Other activities include the Black Cat Revue dance line team, the cheerleading squad, and their Cross Country Team. The school is home to many clubs such as the National Beta Club, the Octagon Club, the National Honor Society, Destination Imagination, and FCA. Being very close to Barksdale Air Force Base, the school has a prominent JROTC program, the LA-071st, which is the second largest JROTC program in the state of Louisiana with more than 300 students in the curriculum. The program includes a widely successful Cyber Patriot team that finished in the top one percent of nationwide teams at the CyberPatriot VI National Finals in 2014.

The school is the recipient of a $500,000 National Math and Science Initiative grant sponsored by the Department of Defense Education Activity for the improvement and promotion of Advanced Placement courses at the school. The school also is a three-year recipient of the State Farm Celebrate My Drive grant, totaling up to $150,000 overall. The grant money from Celebrate My Drive is used to promote safe driving and improve student life overall.

== Athletics ==
Parkway High athletics competes in the LHSAA as a 5A school.

== Marching and concert band ==
The school is home to a large instrumental music program.. This program is divided into two major classifications, marching band and concert band. The program also includes a jazz band, orchestra and a basketball pep band.

The school's marching band program, widely known as the Pride of Pantherland, is a nearly 200-member Corps Style competition band. The Pride of Pantherland performs at most home football games at halftime and participates in four to five marching competitions per season. Recent accolades of the Pride of Pantherland Marching Band include Grand Champions at the Northwestern State University Classic on the Cane Invitational in the 2014, 2015, 2016, 2021 and 2023 seasons, superior ratings at the LMEA District VIII Marching Assessment, and seventh place at the Louisiana Showcase of Marching Bands in 2015 and fourth place in 2017. The marching band also hosts their own invitational in early October at which they perform in exhibition. Parkway's marching band performed half-time for the Saints vs. Steelers in New Orleans on December 23, 2018. The school's concert band program features two main performing ensembles, the symphonic band and the wind ensemble. The symphonic band is made up mostly of younger players and performs musical literature with a focus on expanding the skill of instrumentalists. The wind ensemble is mostly LMEA District VIII honor bands members who are selected through audition. The wind ensemble performs collegiate-level musical literature and serves as the school's main concert ensemble. Recent accolades of the Parkway Concert Bands include superior ratings at district festival, superior ratings at the Smoky Mountain Music Festival in 2015, and a high number of students in the LMEA District VIII Honor Bands. In 2018, Parkway performed at the Bands of America in Indianapolis, IN. They are currently preparing for the 2019 Percy Grainger Festival in Chicago, IL.

== Notable alumni ==
- Seth Lugo (2008), Kansas City Royals pitcher
- Terrace Marshall Jr. (2018), Wide Receiver for the San Francisco 49ers and CFP National Champion (2019), 2nd round draft pick by the Carolina Panthers of the NFL in 2021
- Israel Mukuamu (2018), Dallas Cowboys safety
- Eric Brown (2019), Milwaukee Brewers shortstop
- Mikaylah Williams (2023), Guard for the LSU Tigers, 2x Gatorade Player of the Year
