= Bossier Press-Tribune =

US newspaper

The Bossier Press-Tribune
- Type: Weekly newspaper (formerly daily)
- Owner(s): Specht Newspapers, Inc.
- Publisher: David Arthur Specht, Jr.
- Founded: 1940 (as Bossier Tribune)
- Language: English
- Sister newspapers: Minden Press-Herald
- Website: bossierpress.com

The Bossier Press-Tribune is a newspaper serving Bossier Parish in northwestern Louisiana. Published on Wednesdays, the Press-Tribute covers mostly local news but includes regional, state, and national coverage for its readership when warranted.

== History ==
The origin of The Press-Tribune can be traced to 1940 when, as the weekly Bossier Tribune, it was in competition with the Planters Press. In 1945, T. L. Morris sold the Bossier Tribune to Larry Freeman, who was also the publisher of a Jewish newspaper in Shreveport. In the latter 1970s, the Bossier Tribune and The Planters Press merged to become the Bossier Press-Tribune.

In the 1990s, Robert E. "Bob" Barton, the owner of The Press-Tribune at the time and who served in the Louisiana House of Representatives from 1996 to 2000, purchased (from Wilton Corley) the Bossier Banner-Progress, a 131-year-old weekly newspaper that served the parish seat in Benton.

The publisher is David Arthur Specht, Jr. (born 1969) of Specht Newspapers, Inc. The Press-Tribune began daily publication in 2008, but has since been reduced to thrice-weekly publication. The sports editor is Russell Wayne Hedges, a son of football coach Lee Hedges of Shreveport.

The Press-Tribune is a sister publication of the Minden Press-Herald in Minden in neighboring Webster Parish, Louisiana.
