= Senator Whittington =

Senator Whittington may refer to:

- William Madison Whittington (1878–1962), Mississippi State Senate
- V. V. Whittington (1893–1974), Louisiana State Senate
