= Senator Dortch =

Senator Dortch may refer to:

- E. S. Dortch (1841–1943), Louisiana State Senator for Bossier and Webster parishes from 1900 to 1908
- William Theophilus Dortch (1824–1889), Confederate States Senator from North Carolina from 1862 to 1865
