= John Sandlin =

John Sandlin may refer to:

- John N. Sandlin (1872–1957), American lawyer, jurist, and politician
- Johnny Sandlin (1945–2017), American recording engineer and record producer
