= John T. Watkins =

American judge (1854-1925)

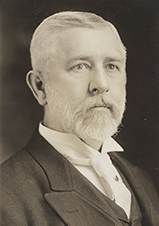

Member of the U.S. House of Representatives from Louisiana's 4th district
- In office March 4, 1905 – March 3, 1921
- Preceded by: Phanor Breazeale
- Succeeded by: John N. Sandlin

Personal details
- Born: John Thomas Watkins; January 15, 1855 Webster Parish, Louisiana, U.S.
- Died: April 25, 1925 (aged 71) Louisiana, U.S.
- Resting place: Murrell Cemetery in Minden, Louisiana
- Party: Democratic
- Spouse: Elizabeth Murrell
- Parent: J. D. Watkins (father)
- Relatives: Lynn B. Watkins (uncle)
- Education: Cumberland University
- Occupation: Lawyer

John Thomas Watkins (January 15, 1854 – April 25, 1925) was an American lawyer, jurist and politician who served eight terms as a U.S. representative for Louisiana's 4th congressional district from 1905 to 1921.

== Early life and education ==
John Thomas Watkins was the oldest of two sons raised by his parents, J. D. Watkins and Mary Morrow Watkins. His father was a judge and State Senator in Louisiana. Born in Minden, Webster Parish, in 1854, John Thomas Watkins attended Minden Male Academy and spent three years at Cumberland University in Tennessee. He studied law and was admitted to the bar in 1878, when he began working in his fathers law practice in Minden.

== Family ==
In 1879, at the age of 25, he married Elizabeth Murrell. As children, John T. and Elizabeth had been baptized in the same Baptist church in Minden on the same day.

== Political career ==
He won election as judge of the district court three times, serving from 1892 to 1904. After leaving the bench, he resumed the practice of law.

In 1902, he considered running for Congress against longtime incumbent Phanor Breazeale, but decided against it. Instead, he focused his attention on the Louisiana Baptist Convention, where he gave the keynote address in 1902. He was subsequently elected president of the convention for the 1902–1903 term. After completing his term as president, he decided it was time to challenge Breazeale in the 1904 election.

=== Tenure in Congress ===
Running as a Democrat, Watkins defeated Breazeale with 58 percent of the vote, taking his seat in the Fifty-ninth Congress on March 4, 1905. He was subsequently re-elected to the seven succeeding Congresses, serving until March 3, 1921.

In the House, he rose to be chairman of the Committee on Revision of the Laws. He held that position during the Sixty-second through Sixty-fifth Congresses.

In the 1912 presidential election, Watkins supported Champ Clark of Missouri, who as Speaker of the House had control over Watkins’ legislative priorities. When Clark lost the nomination to New Jersey governor Woodrow Wilson, Watkins was left on unfriendly terms with the new administration.

The bad relationship with Wilson grew worse when Watkins initially sided with Speaker Clark in opposing Wilson's proposal for U.S. involvement in World War I. Appearing politically vulnerable, Watkins was challenged in the 1918 Democratic primary by Louisiana judge John N. Sandlin, who had served with Watkins as a delegate to the 1912 Democratic Convention, where Sandlin had supported Wilson. Watkins narrowly defeated Sandlin in the 1918 primary after a bitter campaign.

Sandlin ran again in 1920 and defeated Watkins by a large margin.

== After Congress ==
After his defeat, Watkins chose to remain in Washington, D.C., taking up a legal practice there. His wife Elizabeth had died shortly after the 1920 election, and Watkins had also lost a daughter in 1916. His son died in 1923, leaving him with two surviving adult daughters.

== Death ==
John T. Watkins died in Washington on April 25, 1925. His body was returned to Louisiana and is interred in Murrell Cemetery in Minden, Louisiana.

U.S. House of Representatives
Preceded by Phanor Breazeale	Member of the U.S. House of Representatives from Louisiana's 4th congressional district 1905 – 1921	Succeeded by John N. Sandlin
