= Vol Dooley =

American sheriff

Sheriff of Bossier Parish, Louisiana
- In office July 8, 1976 – July 1, 1988
- Preceded by: William Edward "Willie" Waggonner
- Succeeded by: Larry Deen

Personal details
- Born: Vol Sevier Dooley Jr. January 20, 1927 Memphis, Shelby County, Tennessee, USA
- Died: August 11, 2014 (aged 87) Bossier City, Louisiana
- Cause of death: Lengthy illness
- Resting place: Hillcrest Cemetery in Haughton, Louisiana
- Party: Democrat / later Republican
- Spouse(s): (1) Bobbie Katherine Dooley (divorced) (2) Ruth Lilley Dooley
- Children: 7; 28 grandchildren
- Parent(s): Vol Sr., and Sadie Rae Hargrove Dooley
- Occupation: Law-enforcement officer

Vol Sevier Dooley Jr. (January 20, 1927 – August 11, 2014) was an American sheriff. He served as sheriff of Bossier Parish in northwestern Louisiana from 1976 until 1988. He was involved in the false conviction of rodeo star Jack Favor in 1967.

== Early life and career ==
Born in Memphis, Tennessee, Dooley joined Troop G of the Louisiana State Police in 1950, and in 1954, joined the Bossier Sheriff's Office. With the state police, he developed an expertise in fingerprinting and photographic equipment, which he brought to the sheriff's department.

In 1967, as chief deputy, Dooley was accused of involvement in a plot by Sheriff Waggonner, Judge O. E. Price, and District Attorney Louis H. Padgett Jr. to falsely convict rodeo champion Jack Favor of Fort Worth, Texas, of the double-murder of an elderly couple. Favor sued for wrongful conviction and imprisonment, settling for $55,000.

== Service as sheriff ==
Dooley was elected sheriff in a special election in 1976 to fill the remainder of the preceding term, and was reelected in 1979 and 1983. In 1984, Dooley and six of his deputies were found liable for injuries incurred by prison inmate Jessie Lee Smith while being transported from the Bossier Parish Jail in Benton to the Elayn Hunt Correctional Center in St. Gabriel, Louisiana.

In 1985, Dooley was cited in a Chicago Tribune piece on Louisiana politics, noting Dooley's friendship with Governor Edwin Edwards:

That's the long-accepted way things work in Louisiana, a state that operates under a political trickle-down theory, beginning with the governor. Just as in the economic trickle-down theory, the political version goes that if the big guns at the top are taken care of, the benefits will eventually reach everyone else down below. In the form, for example, of more hospital rooms. Eventually the power and its benefits, albeit on a much smaller scale, trickle down to the parishes--as the counties are called in Louisiana--to the Vol Dooleys and the Wiley Fallons.

Dooley lost his final bid for reelection in October 1987 to former chief deputy, Larry Deen, with Dooley winning less than 29 percent of the vote. Dooley thereafter worked in security for the Port of Shreveport.

== Personal life and death ==
Dooley divorced his first wife, with whom he had four children, and remarried. One of his sons, Vol Dooley III, was murdered in 2001. Dooley died in Bossier City at age 87, following a long illness.

Preceded by William Edward "Willie" Waggonner	Sheriff of Bossier Parish, Louisiana; 1976—1988	Succeeded by Larry Deen
