= Willie Waggonner =

American sheriff

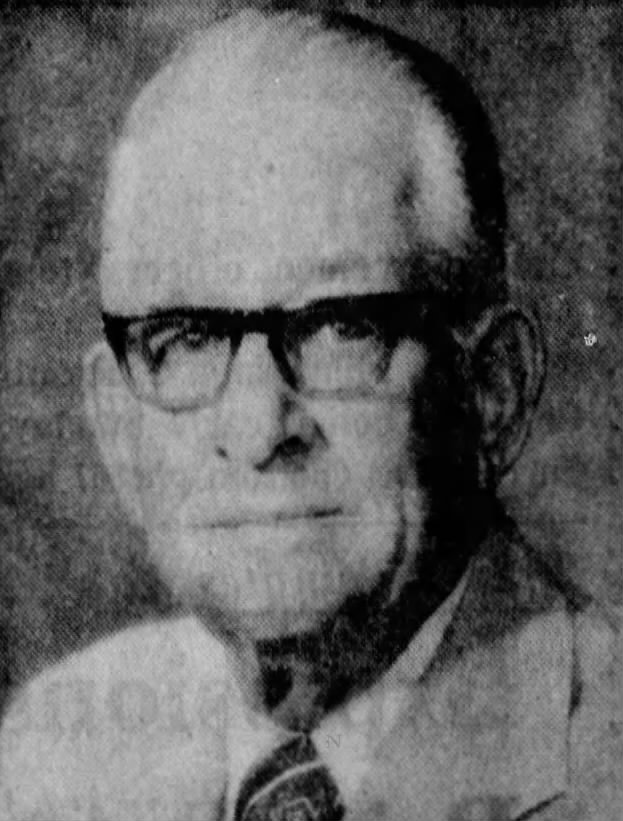
- Waggonner in 1976

Sheriff of Bossier Parish, Louisiana
- In office July 1, 1948 – May 9, 1976
- Preceded by: Louis H. Padgett Jr.
- Succeeded by: Vol Dooley

Personal details
- Born: William Edward Waggonner; August 7, 1905 Plain Dealing, Louisiana, U.S.
- Died: May 9, 1976 (aged 70) Plain Dealing, Louisiana, U.S.
- Party: Democratic
- Relatives: Joe Waggonner (brother)
- Profession: Law enforcement

William Edward Waggonner (August 7, 1905 – May 9, 1976) was an American sheriff. He served as the sheriff in Bossier Parish, Louisiana from 1948 to 1976.

== Life and career ==
Waggonner was born in Plain Dealing, Louisiana, the brother of Joe Waggonner, a United States representative. Waggonner attended at the Plain Dealing Middle/High School, where he later graduated. He served as a member of the Plain Dealing Masonic Lodge, with also being a member of the Plain Dealing Lions Club and Bossier Chamber of Commerce. In the 1960s, Waggonner was a part of rodeo performer Jack Favor's falsely accused murder and robbery case, in which he was exceedingly concerned along with district attorney Louis H. Padgett Jr. for which the case was solved.

Waggonner died on May 9, 1976 of a heart attack at his home in Plain Dealing, Louisiana, at the age of 70. According to his The Times obituary, he survived at least three heart attacks.
