= Robert C. Smith (political scientist) =

American political scientist (born 1947)

- Born: February 12, 1947; Benton, Louisiana
- Died: April 13, 2023 (aged 76)
- Education: University of California, Berkeley; University of California, Los Angeles; Howard University
- Known for: Work on racial politics in the United States
- Spouse: Scottie Gibson (m. 1972)
- Children: 3
- Awards: Distinguished Ph.D. Alumni Award from Howard University (1998)
- Scientific career
- Fields: Political science
- Institutions: San Francisco State University
- Thesis: Black elites and Black groups in the federal policy process: a study in interest articulation (1976)

Robert Charles Smith (February 12, 1947 - April 13, 2023) was a political science professor at San Francisco State University (SFSU). He is known for his scholarship on race and politics in the United States, about which he has written several books. The "Black Politics" class he began teaching at SFSU in 1990 proved controversial; students protested the class because it was offered in the political science department rather than the African American studies department, which was interpreted by some students as encroaching on the latter department's area of focus.
