= Judge Watkins =

Judge Watkins may refer to:

- Harry Evans Watkins (1898–1963), judge of the United States District Courts for the Northern and the Southern Districts of West Virginia
- Henry Hitt Watkins (1866–1947), judge of the United States District Court for the Western District of South Carolina
- Robert Dorsey Watkins (1900–1986), judge of the United States District Court for the District of Maryland
- William Keith Watkins (born 1951), judge of the United States District Court for the Middle District of Alabama

== See also ==
- Justice Watkins (disambiguation)
