= William Benton Boggs =

American politician (1854–1922)

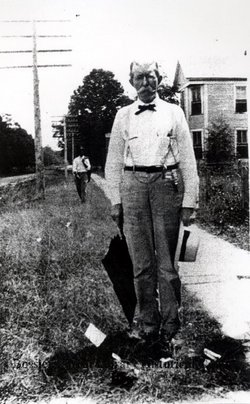
- Boggs in the 1900s

Member of the Louisiana House of Representatives
- In office 1892–1900
- Preceded by: Robert Houston Curry
- Succeeded by: W. H. McClenaghen

Member of the Louisiana State Senate
- In office 1908–1916
- Preceded by: E. S. Dortch
- Succeeded by: William J. Johnston

Personal details
- Born: October 8, 1854 Alabama, U.S.
- Died: February 18, 1922 (aged 67) Louisiana, U.S.
- Party: Democratic
- Children: 2

William Benton Boggs (October 8, 1854 – February 18, 1922) was an American politician. He served as a Democratic member of the Louisiana House of Representatives and the Louisiana State Senate.

Boggs was born in Alabama, the son of Lucinda Barnett and Samuel Boggs. Boggs served as the mayor of Plain Dealing, Louisiana. In 1892, he was elected to the Louisiana House of Representatives. Boggs succeeded Robert Houston Curry. In 1900, he was succeeded by W. H. McClenaghen. Eight years later, Boggs was elected to the Louisiana State Senate. He succeeded E. S. Dortch. In 1916, Boggs was succeeded by William J. Johnston.

Boggs died in February 1922 in Alabama, at the age of 67. He was buried in Plain Dealing Cemetery.
