= Bossier Parish School Board =

School district in Louisiana, United States

Coordinates: 32.75308°N 93.65978°W

Address
- 410 Sibley St Benton, Bossier Parish, Louisiana, 71006; United States

District information
- Superintendent: Jason Rowland

Other information
- Website: www.bossierschools.org

Bossier Parish School Board is a school district headquartered in Benton, Louisiana, United States. The Superintendent of Bossier Schools is, as of 2024, Jason Rowland.

The district serves all of Bossier Parish.

== History ==
The first school built by Bossier Parish School Board was Benton High School in 1890. By 1905 It had three teachers and one graduating class. The school taught grades 6–12 with no more than 25 students per grade, with some grades missing students. In May 1969 the Supreme Court issued Desegregation in schools. The only black school in Benton, C.H. Irion High School, became Benton Elementary School; for the first time in Bossier School History blacks and whites were able to go to the same school. Benton High School currently teaches grades 9–12.

In 2016 the areas within Bossier City were seeing declining student populations while several outerlying areas are having increasing populations.

== Controversies ==
Bossier Parish Schools was criticized when staff emails were published displaying a cavalier attitude about teaching creationism directly from the Bible to students. One teacher, Carolyn Goodwin, mentioned that "We pray at school functions and probably break the law all the time!!”

In February 2017, Americans United for Separation of Church and State filed a federal lawsuit alleging a variety of unconstitutional practices. The lawsuit was filed by multiple anonymous plaintiffs (represented by Americans United) who alleged official prayers were regularly held at school events (many of which were being held in churches). Classroom teachers, who were uniformly Christians, taught creationism and required students to recite prayers. Teachers and coaches also promoted religious student clubs and off-campus religious events. Religious items were displayed in classrooms and offices.

A joint consent decree between the Bossier Parish School Board and the Bossier parents represented by Americans United was filed with the U.S. District Court for Western Louisiana on January 22, 2018. This consent decree would end official prayers, teacher proselytism, teaching of creationism, religious displays, and staff organization of any religious activities at Bossier Parish Schools. It would also require the district to create a monitoring committee to identify and resolve any future violations.

In September 2017, in reaction to the protests by professional athletes during the playing of "The Star Spangled Banner", the superintendent of the Bossier Parish School Board, Scott Smith, released a statement requiring all athletes at schools in the parish to stand during the playing of the anthem. The statement read: "Our principals and their coaching staffs have sole discretion in determining consequences should a student athlete elect not to stand during the National Anthem and they are making their expectations known to players and their families this week." A letter to parents and students signed by the principal of Parkway High School outlined punishments ranging from a one-game suspension to physical punishments, such as extra running for failure to comply, to removal from the team for continued protests.

== Notable former school board members ==
- Henry Burns
- Jake W. Cameron
- Joe Waggonner

== Schools ==
=== K-12 schools ===
- Plain Dealing High School (Plain Dealing)

=== High schools ===
- Airline High School (Bossier City)
- Benton High School (Benton)
- Bossier High School (Bossier City)
- Haughton High School (Haughton)
- Parkway High School (Unincorporated area)
- Bossier Parish School for Technology and Innovative Learning (Bossier City)

=== Middle schools ===
6-8

- Benton Middle School (Benton)
- Cope Middle School (Bossier City)
- Elm Grove Middle School (Bossier City)
- Greenacres Middle School (Bossier City)
- Haughton Middle School (Haughton)
- Rusheon Middle School (Bossier City)

=== Elementary schools ===
PK-5

- Bossier Elementary School (Bossier City)
- Central Park Elementary School (Bossier City)
- Plantation Park Elementary School (Bossier City)
  - In 2016 there was a controversy over whether the name should be changed.
- Meadowview Elementary School (Bossier City)
- Waller Elementary School (Bossier City)

K-5

- Apollo Elementary School (Bossier City)
- Elm Grove Elementary (Elm Grove)
- R. V. Kerr Elementary School (Bossier City)
- Stockwell Place Elementary School (Bossier City)
- Legacy Elementary School (Bossier City)
- W. T. Lewis Elementary School (Bossier City)

4-5

- Curtis Elementary School (Bossier City)
- Princeton Elementary School (Princeton)

K-4

- Benton Elementary School (Benton)

K-3

- Bellaire Elementary School (Bossier City)
- Sun City Elementary School (Bossier City)

2-3

- Platt Elementary School (Eastwood CDP)

K-1

- T. L. Rodes Elementary School (Eastwood CDP)

=== Former schools ===
- Carrie Martin Elementary School (Plain Dealing) - Renamed from Plain Dealing Elementary School in 2003. Merged into Plain Dealing HS after 2017
