= Overton Brooks =

American congressman from Louisiana (1897–1961)

Thomas Overton Brooks
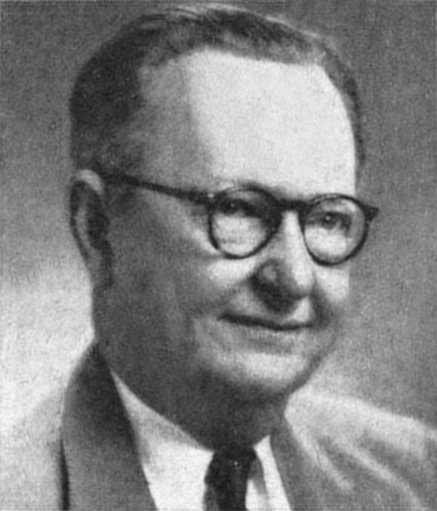

Chairman of the House Science and Astronautics Committee
- In office January 3, 1959 – September 16, 1961
- Speaker: Sam Rayburn
- Preceded by: Committee established
- Succeeded by: George P. Miller

Member of the U.S. House of Representatives from Louisiana's 4th district
- In office January 3, 1937 – September 16, 1961
- Preceded by: John N. Sandlin
- Succeeded by: Joe Waggonner

Personal details
- Born: December 21, 1897 Baton Rouge, Louisiana, U.S.
- Died: September 16, 1961 (aged 63) Bethesda, Maryland, U.S.
- Resting place: Forest Park East Cemetery in Shreveport, Louisiana
- Party: Democratic
- Spouse: Mary Fontaine "Mollie" Meriwether (m. 1932)
- Relations: John H. Overton (uncle); Walter Hampden Overton (great-grandfather)
- Children: 1
- Education: Louisiana State University (LLB)
- Occupation: Attorney

Military service
- Branch/service: United States Army
- Years of service: World War I

The Veterans Administration Hospital in Shreveport, Louisiana, is named for Overton Brooks; photo taken from Clyde Fant Parkway (2012)

Thomas Overton Brooks (December 21, 1897 – September 16, 1961) was a Democratic U.S. representative from the Shreveport-based fourth congressional district of northwestern Louisiana, serving for nearly a quarter century, beginning on January 3, 1937 until his death in office on September 16, 1961. Originally a supporter of Franklin Delano Roosevelt's New Deal, he became part of the conservative wing of the Democratic Party.

From a prominent family, Brooks was a nephew of U.S. Senator John Holmes Overton, a staunch ally of Huey Long, and a great-grandson of Walter Hampden Overton. At the time of his death, he was chairman of the House Science and Astronautics Committee.

== Before politics ==
Brooks was born in Baton Rouge to Claude M. Brooks and the former Penelope Overton. He graduated from public schools. Brooks served overseas during World War I as an enlisted man in the Sixth Field Artillery, First Division, Regular Army, 1918–1919.

After the war, he obtained a degree in 1923 from Louisiana State University Law Center in Baton Rouge. He was admitted to the bar and began his practice in Shreveport in Caddo Parish in the northwestern corner of his state.

In 1928, Brooks represented Walter Lawson, a Black baseball fan, in his federal lawsuit against baseball player Art Shires and the Shreveport Sports. Brooks alleged that Shires intentionally threw a ball into the Negro grandstand, breaking Lawson's jaw. Lawson died a few months after the incident, allegedly due to a brain injury.

On June 1, 1932, Brooks married the former Mary Fontaine "Mollie" Meriwether, daughter of Minor Meriwether, a planter and banker, and the former Anne Finley McNutt. Overton and Mollie Brooks had one child, Laura Anne Brooks (1936-1994).

== Political career ==
=== Election campaigns ===
Brooks was first elected to Congress in 1936, succeeding John N. Sandlin, who had chosen not to run for reelection in order to make an unsuccessful run for the Senate. Brooks, who ran as the "Long-Allen candidate", defeated Wilburn V. Lunn, his opponent in the Democratic Party primary, then won the general election.

Brooks was reelected to Congress twelve times. He won the general election with more than 90 percent of the vote in 1938, while facing the nominal opposition of Ben Neal running as an independent.

Brooks overcame primary opposition in 1940, a year in which Sam H. Jones (1897–1978) , running as a reformer against the Long machine, urged that Brooks be ousted. Brooks eliminated two of his opponents, state Representative Wellborn Jack (1907–1991) of Caddo Parish, and J. Frank Colbert (1882–1949), the former mayor of Minden, before beating Henry Andrew O'Neal, a Shreveport insurance agent, in the second round of balloting. Brooks then won a victory by the customary landslide in the general election.

In 1948, Brooks defeated two intra-party rivals, Harvey Locke Carey (1915–1984) of Minden, a former short-term U.S. attorney for the United States District Court for the Western District of Louisiana, and former State Senator Lloyd Hendrick (1908–1951), a Natchitoches Parish native residing in Shreveport.

In 1950, Brooks faced a challenge from the right mounted by James H. Greene (1918–1988), a 32-year-old graduate of Fair Park High School, a veteran of the United States Navy, and at the time a reporter for the now defunct Shreveport Journal. Brooks defeated him handily.

In the summer of 1952 Brooks faced off against another young rival, attorney Lawrence L. May, Jr. (1921–1995), in the primary. May declared himself "an anti-Truman, anti-New Deal, anti-communist Democrat" who could not be "bought or bribed." He denounced federal bureaucracy, claimed that Congress had followed the blueprint of The Communist Manifesto, and complained that inflated home prices and large federal withholding rates from paychecks meant that many could "barely buy groceries." May went on to criticize the way the Truman Administration was prosecuting the Korean War, while claiming that Brooks had given tacit support of a "Marxist" foreign policy: "We cannot return sanity in foreign affairs by returning to Congress the same men who got us into this mess." After defeating May in the primary Brooks ran unopposed in the general election.

Brooks faced Mrs. Sophie Thompson in the 1954 Democratic primary for his House seat. He won in a walk with over 90 percent of the vote. He did not face any Republican opposition in the general election.

In 1956 Brooks ran against L. Calhoun Allen, Jr. (1920-1990), the first Republican to seek that congressional seat since Reconstruction, who ran on a platform of states rights, "100 percent racial segregation", and "peace, prosperity and progress"—all of which Brooks likewise endorsed. Brooks also urged the strengthening of our national defense, the expanded production of natural gas, rural electrification, and "fair prices" for farm, dairy, and ranch products.

Brooks won with 62 percent of the vote. The national party did not do as well: although Brooks had endorsed Adlai Stevenson for president, his Republican opponent, Dwight D. Eisenhower became the first Republican since the Reconstruction era to win Louisiana's electoral votes. (Note: Allen, who had declared himself an "Eisenhower Republican", later returned to the Democratic Party and held a number of local offices, including mayor of Shreveport, over the next several decades.)

Brooks faced Thompson again in the 1958 Democratic primary; he won by an even greater margin. He ran unopposed in the general election.

In Brooks's last election in 1960 he faced another Republican challenger, Fred Charles McClanahan Jr. (1918–2007), a contractor from Shreveport who was reared in Homer in Claiborne Parish. McClanahan had flown sixty-eight combat missions in World War II and received the Distinguished Flying Cross, the Air Medal, and the Purple Heart. His wife, Mary, an educator, was active in the League of Women Voters. George Despot, later a state Republican chairman, was his campaign manager.

McClanahan called for a two-party system, which he maintained would "bring us new recognition and respect in national affairs and stabilize state government with a constant watchdog...." McClanahan, who endorsed the Nixon-Lodge ticket, called for the United States "to lead the free world in resisting the spread of communism and winning the Cold War in this hemisphere and in every country. ... Our foreign aid program must be re-evaluated on the basis of our aims...." Like Brooks, McClanahan affirmed his support for states' rights and segregation, having proclaimed "No right of the United States government to force integration in public schools."

Brooks prevailed in his final race, 74-26 percent, though the Kennedy-Johnson ticket did not carry the Fourth Congressional District.

=== Service on the Armed Services and Astronautics Committees ===
Brooks served on the House Committee on Armed Services from 1947 to 1958. From his berth on the House Armed Services Committee, Brooks became a champion of veterans' causes. The Overton Brooks Veterans Administration Medical Center at 510 East Stoner Street in Shreveport south of I-Interstate 20 and viewed from along the Clyde Fant Parkway is named in his honor.

He then became the first chairman of the newly formed House Space Committee (later the House Science and Astronautics Committee), reportedly because his seniority entitled him to a more important post on Armed Services than he was considered capable of handling. Whatever the reasons for his appointment as Chair of this new committee, Brooks was "a tireless worker" who saw the committee's mission as embracing all aspects of scientific research, not just astronautics.

Brooks was reappointed chair of the Science and Astronautics Committee in 1961. At a time when NASA's programs and budget were under review, Brooks strongly supported a civilian, rather than military, space program. On May 4, 1961, his committee sent a memo to then Vice President Lyndon B. Johnson on this subject. President John F. Kennedy's speech which prompted the development of the Apollo program was delivered a few weeks later.

=== Foreign policy positions ===
Brooks supported the Truman Doctrine and the Truman Administration's policy of containment of the Soviet Union. In 1947–1948 Brooks served on the Herter Committee, established by the Republican majority in Congress to review conditions in postwar Europe and proposals for the economic aid program known as "the Marshall Plan". Brooks headed the subcommittee concerned with the Armed Services. The committee issued a report supporting the Marshall Plan on bipartisan lines, endorsed by both isolationists and internationalists on the Committee.

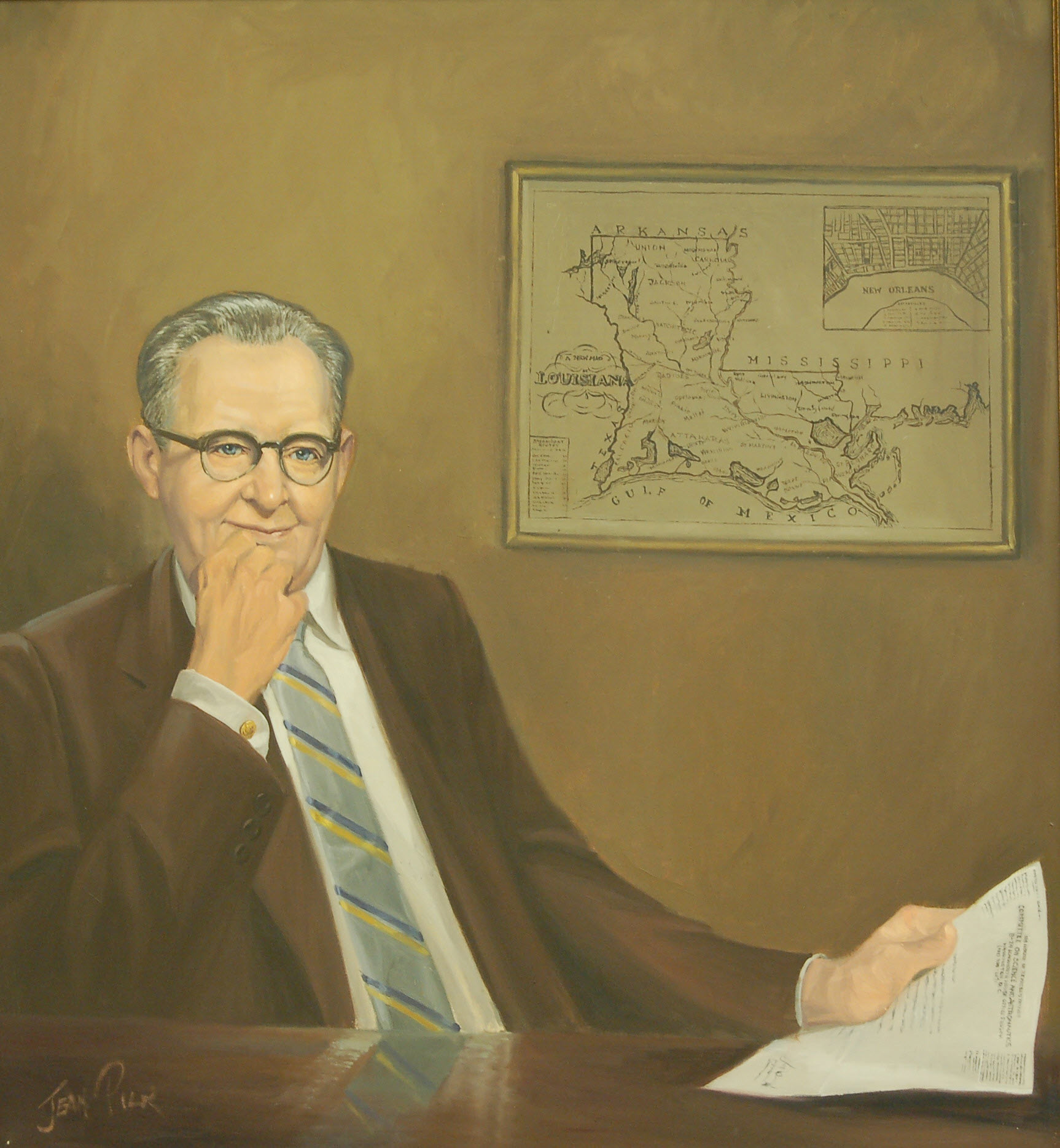
Portrait of Brooks in the Collection of the U.S. House of Representatives

Brooks was a staunch anti-communist throughout the Cold War. That did not, however, prevent his political opponents from claiming that he supported a "Marxist" foreign policy.

=== Civil rights ===
The white voters of the Fourth Congressional District were, throughout Brooks' tenure, fiercely opposed to integration; in 1964 an unnamed reporter claimed "there are more haters per square mile [in Shreveport] than anywhere else in the country". Brooks was, not surprisingly, an unflagging defender of racial segregation in all aspects of society.

In 1956, Brooks signed the Southern Manifesto, a protest by Senators and House members from the Deep South of the desegregation of public schools ordered by the United States Supreme Court in the case Brown v. Board of Education. Brooks also employed Ned Touchstone, one of the first leaders of the arch-segregationist White Citizens' Council movement in Louisiana, as part of his Congressional staff for five years.

Even so he still faced frequent opposition from candidates who described themselves as more committed than Brooks to preserving segregation. This opposition became particularly heated after he voted on January 31, 1961 to expand the House Rules Committee to permit Speaker Sam Rayburn of Texas to appoint newer, more liberal members to the panel, which determines the rules under which bills will be brought to the House floor for debate and vote.

Conservatives in both parties generally opposed this vote, which they termed "packing the Rules Committee," comparing it to Roosevelt's failed "court packing scheme" of 24 years earlier. Many southern Democrats saw the expansion of the committee as certain to advance civil rights legislation to House floor, rather than to keep it confined to the committee, where Howard W. Smith of Virginia was the chairman and opponents held the upper hand. Joe Waggonner, another early leader of the White Citizens' Council movement in Louisiana, later announced that he would challenge Brooks in the August 1962 Democratic primary.

A civic group known as the Congressional Affairs League of Louisiana was formed to express a vote of "No Confidence" in Brooks. Among the organizers of the League were Charles E. Roemer, II, who was later a supporter of African Americans' civil rights and the commissioner of administration for eight years under Governor Edwin Edwards and the father of Governor Buddy Roemer, but was then a committed segregationist.

That same year Roy Davis, an American preacher, white supremacist, and con artist who co-founded the second iteration of the Ku Klux Klan in 1915, led a Ku Klux Klan rally in Coushatta, (Note: Coushatta was the site of the Coushatta Massacre in 1874, an attack by members of the White League, a white supremacist paramilitary organization composed of white Southern Democrats, on Republican officeholders and freedmen in which they assassinated six white Republicans and five to 20 freedmen who were witnesses.) roughly fifty miles from Shreveport. While the rally was underway crosses were burned in roughly a dozen sites in Shreveport, including the front yard of Brooks' Linden Street home in Shreveport. That led to a denunciation of the incident by the Mayor of Shreveport, a police investigation, and Davis's arrest. Caddo Parish Sheriff J. Howell Flournoy advised Brooks to remain in Washington and not to return home until tensions had eased.

=== Environmental concerns ===
While in Congress Brooks took up the issue of making the Red River navigable from Shreveport to Alexandria, a project continued by his successor, Joe Waggonner, under the name the Red River Waterway Project and eventually completed as the J. Bennett Johnston Waterway. Brooks was associated with the National Rivers and Harbors Congress, an organization of state and city officials, port authority members, engineering company executives, and others interested in navigation improvement projects.

At the same time Brooks became concerned in 1957 with the issue of interstate water pollution, in particular the pollution coming from oil fields in Arkansas that was making the water on Corney Creek and Corney Lake, near Homer, Louisiana in Claiborne Parish, unfit for livestock and recreation. Federal law at the time gave the federal government limited authority to remedy interstate pollution, and then only with the consent of the states involved. Brooks' complaints about fish kills started the process for a dramatic expansion of federal environmental law over the next 15 years, culminating in the Clean Water Act in 1972.

== Death and legacy ==
A few months after the roll call vote on enlargement of the House Rules Committee, Brooks died of a heart attack at Bethesda Naval Hospital in Bethesda, Maryland. Former Shreveport Mayor James C. Gardner stated in his memoirs that he believed Brooks's death was "largely a result of the strain that he experienced from the Rules Committee vote. The party had demanded a vote that had a large and vocal opposition among the congressman's constituents."

Brooks' death propelled Joe Waggonner into the special election to choose a new representative. After winning a closed primary race, Waggonner faced a stronger-than-usual Republican challenger in Charlton Lyons, a Shreveport oilman originally from Vermilion Parish in South Louisiana. Waggonner prevailed with 54 percent of the vote, having carried every parish in the district except Lyons' adopted Caddo Parish. Waggonner ran again with ease in 1962 for election to his first full term in the House.

Brooks was a member of the Masonic Lodge, the Shriners, the Benevolent and Protective Order of Elks, the American Legion, the Veterans of Foreign Wars, and the Kiwanis International.

Brooks is interred at Forest Park Cemetery East in Shreveport. He was Episcopalian.

== See also ==
- List of members of the United States Congress who died in office (1950–1999)

=== Notes ===
U.S. House of Representatives
Preceded by John N. Sandlin	Member of the U.S. House of Representatives from Louisiana's 4th congressional district 1937–1961	Succeeded by Joe Waggonner
