= Brad Pye Jr. =

American journalist (1931–2020)

- Pye in 1970
- Born: June 11, 1931; Plain Dealing, Louisiana, U.S.
- Died: July 5, 2020 (aged 89); Los Angeles, California, U.S.
- Occupations: Sports journalist, broadcaster
- Spouse: Eunice Prye
- Children: 5

Brad Pye Jr. (June 11, 1931 – July 5, 2020) was an American sports journalist, broadcaster, and Los Angeles community activist. He was the first recognized African-American sportswriter in Southern California and the first African-American scout for the Los Angeles/San Diego Chargers. He was the sports director for several African-American radio stations and sportswriter for several local newspapers in the state. He was noted for utilizing his position to advocate equality for and recognition of African-American athletes and journalists.

== Early life ==
Pye was born in Plain Dealing, Louisiana, on June 11, 1931. At the age of 12 he moved to Los Angeles by himself. He lived on Central Avenue on his own for four years, until his mother joined him. He went on to study at Jefferson High School, East Los Angeles College, Compton College, and California State University, Los Angeles. He held various jobs including a shoe shiner, gas station attendant, and factory worker.

== Career ==
Pye served as sports director for major African-American radio stations KGFJ, KACE, KDAY, and KJLH, and was sports editor for the Los Angeles Sentinel for nearly 30 years. He was also a regular sports columnist for the L.A. Watts Times, Compton Bulletin, and Inland Valley News newspapers.

In 1961, Pye became the first African-American public relations staffer in Major League Baseball while working for the Los Angeles Angels. He was also the first African-American administrator in the American Football League while serving under Commissioner Al Davis.

In addition to his work in sports journalism, Pye was active in the Government of Los Angeles County and led a 24-year career working in multiple capacities. In 1987 he began working as a deputy under county supervisor Kenneth Hahn and was promoted to assistant chief deputy three months later. He worked as a top deputy to Yvonne Brathwaite Burke after she succeeded Hahn as county supervisor in 1992. With Burke's support, Pye launched a program to provide free year-round swimming instruction for kids, which continues today as the Aquatic Foundation of Metropolitan Los Angeles.

In 1993, Pye became division chief of the Department of Children and Family Services and worked as the Americans with Disabilities Act (ADA) coordinator and manager of the Disaster Services Section, the Exams/Recruitment Section, and the Health and Safety/Return to Work Section. Pye also volunteered throughout the city of Los Angeles and was the first African-American president of the L.A. Department of Recreation and Parks Board of Commissioners.

== Legacy ==
Pye paved the way for the advancement of African-Americans to senior level positions within Los Angeles city and county government agencies. In 2015, the City of Los Angeles named the gymnasium at Saint Andrews Recreation Center as the Brad Pye Jr. Athletic Center in honor of Pye's impact and contribution to the city and local residents. Pye's papers are preserved at the University Library in Special Collections and Archives at California State University, Northridge.

== Personal life and death ==
Pye was married to Eunice Prye. Together, they had four daughters (Jill, Jenice, Jan, and Sharee) and one son (Brad III). Both his wife and son predeceased him.

Pye died in his sleep on July 5, 2020, at his home in Los Angeles. He was 89 years old. He was buried in Inglewood Park Cemetery on July 22, 2020.
