= J. D. Watkins =

American judge and politician

District Judge of the Louisiana Second Judicial District Court
- In office 1865–1869

Member of the Louisiana State Senate
- In office 1880–1884

Personal details
- Born: John Dyer Watkins; September 27, 1828 Caldwell County, Kentucky, U.S.
- Died: December 19, 1895 (aged 67) Minden, Louisiana, U.S.
- Party: Democratic
- Children: 2; including John T. Watkins
- Relatives: Lynn B. Watkins (brother)
- Education: Cumberland College
- Occupation: Judge

John Dyer Watkins (September 27, 1828 – December 19, 1895) was an American judge and politician. A member of the Democratic Party, he served as district judge of the Second Judicial District Court of Louisiana from 1865 to 1869 and in the Louisiana State Senate from 1880 to 1884.

== Life and career ==
Watkins was born in Caldwell County, Kentucky, the son of Thomas Watkins and Nancy Dyer. He was the brother of Lynn B. Watkins, an associate judge of the Louisiana Supreme Court. He attended and graduated from Cumberland College. After graduating, he worked as a schoolteacher in Minden, Louisiana.

Watkins served as district judge of the Second Judicial District Court of Louisiana from 1865 to 1869. After his service as judge, he served in the Louisiana State Senate from 1880 to 1884.

== Death ==
Watkins died on December 19, 1895, at his home in Minden, Louisiana, at the age of 67.
