= V. V. Whittington =

American banker and politician (1893–1974)

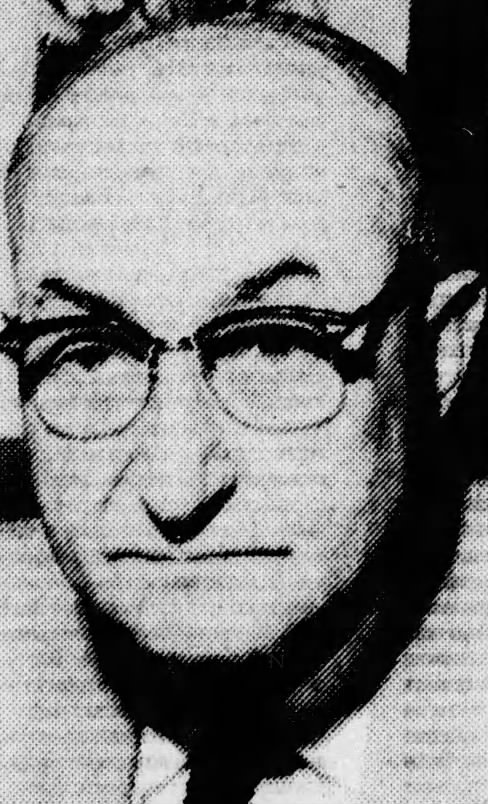

Member of the Louisiana State Senate
- In office 1928–1932

Personal details
- Born: Volney Voss Whittington; September 26, 1893 Bossier Parish, Louisiana, U.S.
- Died: February 7, 1974 (aged 80) Benton, Louisiana, U.S.
- Party: Democratic
- Relatives: Walter O. Bigby (son-in-law)
- Occupation: Banker

Volney Voss Whittington (September 26, 1893 – February 7, 1974) was an American banker and politician. A member of the Democratic Party, he served in the Louisiana State Senate from 1928 to 1932.

== Life and career ==
Whittington was born in Bossier Parish, Louisiana, the son of Jasper and Anna Martin Whittington. He worked as a teacher.

Whittington served in the Louisiana State Senate from 1928 to 1932. After his service in the Senate, he worked as a banker for multiple banking companies, and he served as vice president of the American Banking Association from 1949 to 1951.

== Death ==
Whittington died on February 7, 1974, in Benton, Louisiana, at the age of 80. He was buried at Hillcrest Cemetery.

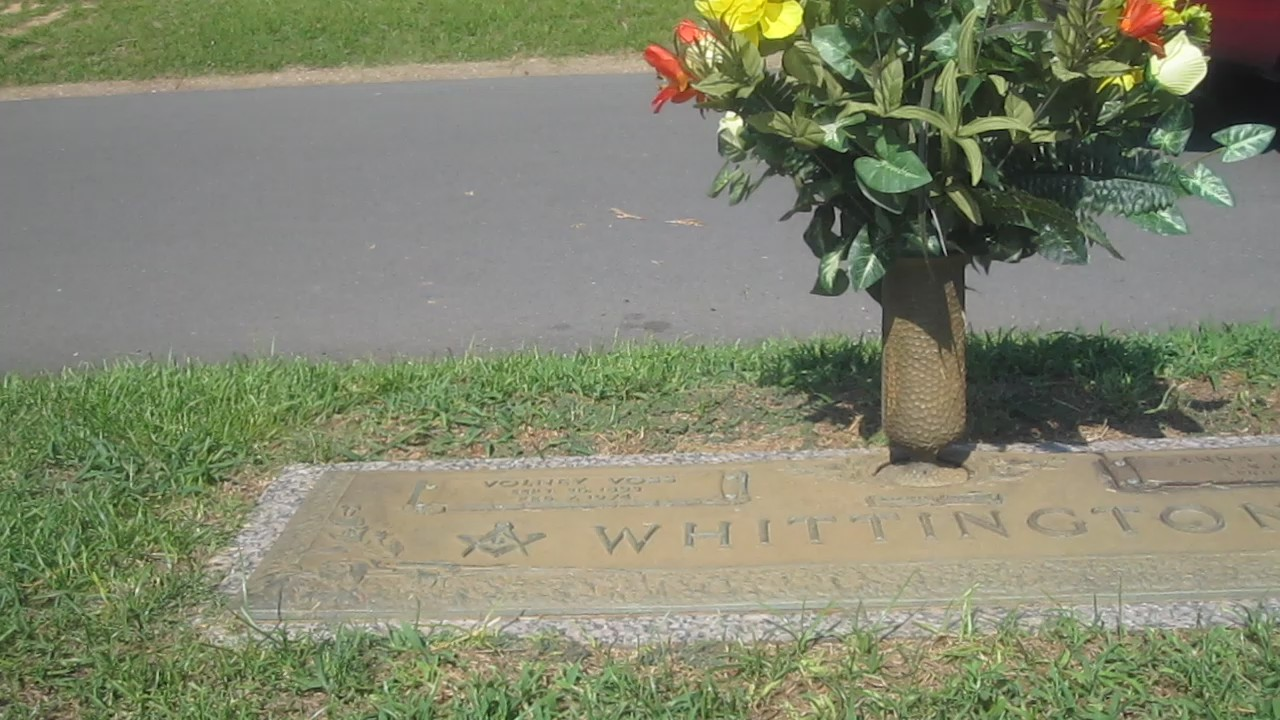
Whittington's grave in 2009
