= Lynn B. Watkins =

American judge (1836–1901)

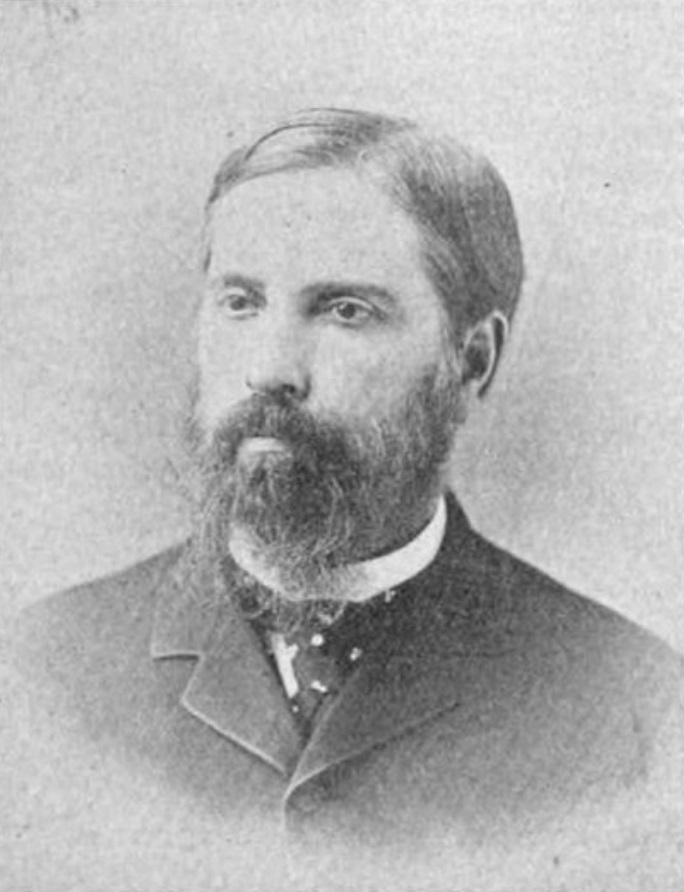

Justice of the Louisiana Supreme Court
- In office April 19, 1886 – March 2, 1901
- Preceded by: Thomas Courtland Manning
- Succeeded by: Olivier O. Provosty

Personal details
- Born: Lynn Boyd Watkins; October 9, 1836; Caldwell County, Kentucky, U.S.
- Died: March 2, 1901 (aged 64); New Orleans, Louisiana, U.S.
- Relatives: J. D. Watkins (brother); John T. Watkins (nephew)
- Profession: Judge

Military service
- Allegiance: Confederate States
- Branch/service: Confederate States Army

Lynn Boyd Watkins (October 9, 1836 – March 2, 1901) was a justice of the Louisiana Supreme Court from April 19, 1886, to March 2, 1901.

Born in Caldwell County, Kentucky, Watkins served in the Confederate States Army and became a District Judge, in Louisiana in 1871. His brother J. D. Watkins was a Louisiana state senator.

Watkins died on March 2, 1961, in New Orleans, Louisiana, at the age of 64.

Political offices
Preceded by Thomas Courtland Manning	Justice of the Louisiana Supreme Court; 1886–1901	Succeeded by Olivier O. Provosty
