= John N. Sandlin =

American politician

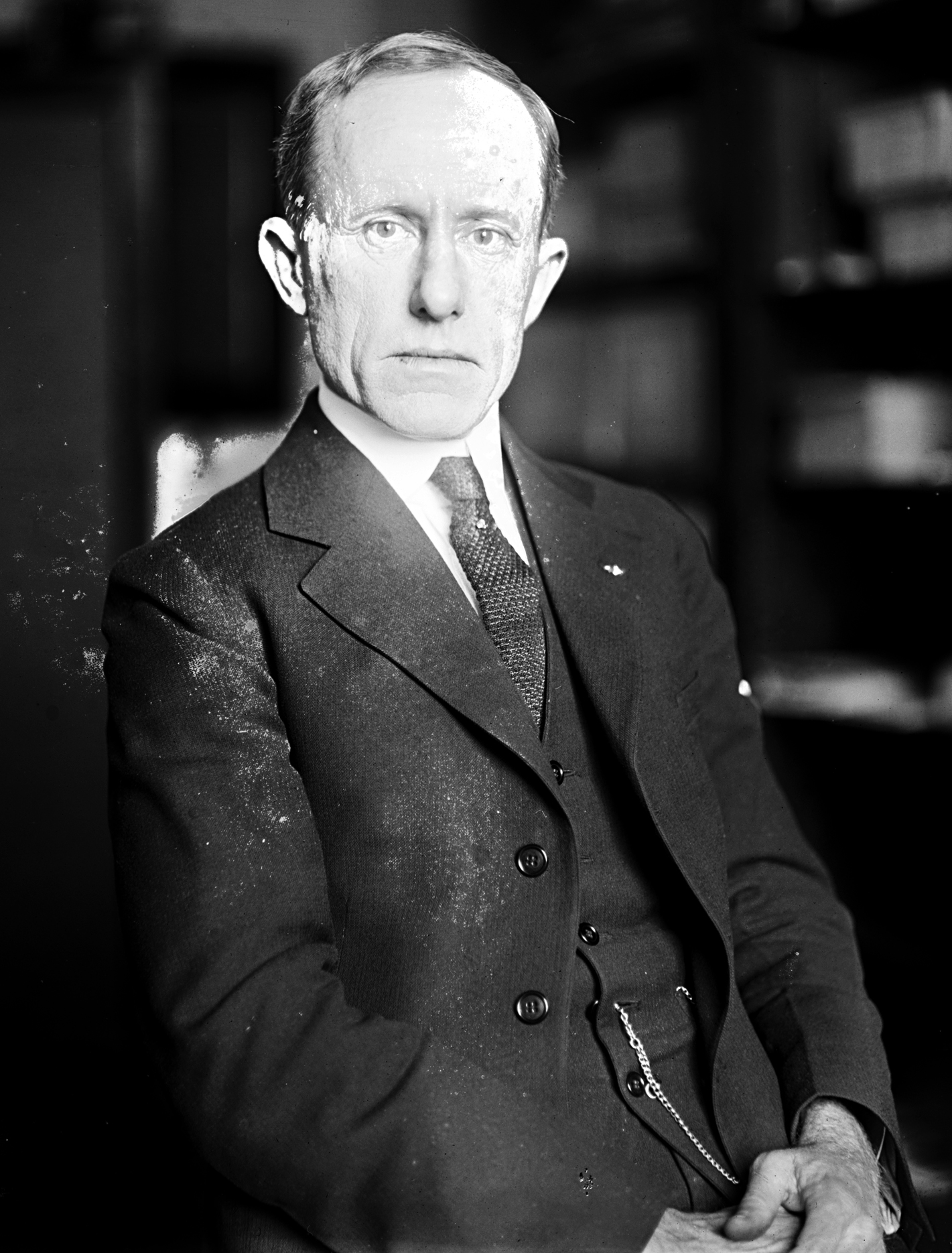

Member of the U.S. House of Representatives from Louisiana's 4th district
- In office March 4, 1921 – January 3, 1937
- Preceded by: John T. Watkins
- Succeeded by: Overton Brooks

Personal details
- Born: John Nicholas Sandlin; February 24, 1872 Minden, Louisiana
- Died: December 25, 1957 (aged 85) Minden, Louisiana
- Resting place: Minden Cemetery, Louisiana, U.S.
- Party: Democratic

John Nicholas Sandlin (February 24, 1872 – December 25, 1957) was an American lawyer, jurist, and politician who served eight terms as a U.S. representative from Louisiana from 1921 to 1937.

== Early life and career ==
John Sandlin was born near Minden, Webster Parish, Louisiana on February 24, 1872. He attended the public schools and went on to study law. He was admitted to the bar in 1896 and commenced practice in Minden.

=== Early career ===
He served as prosecuting attorney for the second district of Louisiana from 1904 to 1910, then became a judge of the Second Judicial District of Louisiana from 1910 to 1920.

== Political career ==
He was a delegate to the Democratic National Convention in 1916, when President Woodrow Wilson was re-nominated for a second term. In 1918, Sandin challenged incumbent Democratic Congressman John T. Watkins in the Democratic primary election, but lost a close race.

=== Congress ===
In 1920, he again ran for Watkins’ seat in the United States House of Representatives. He won election to the 67th Congress and was subsequently re-elected to the seven succeeding Congresses, serving in the House from March 4, 1921, to January 3, 1937.

He was not a candidate for renomination in 1936, choosing instead to run an unsuccessful campaign for nomination to the United States Senator.

== Later career and death ==
He returned to Minden and engaged once again in the practice of law.

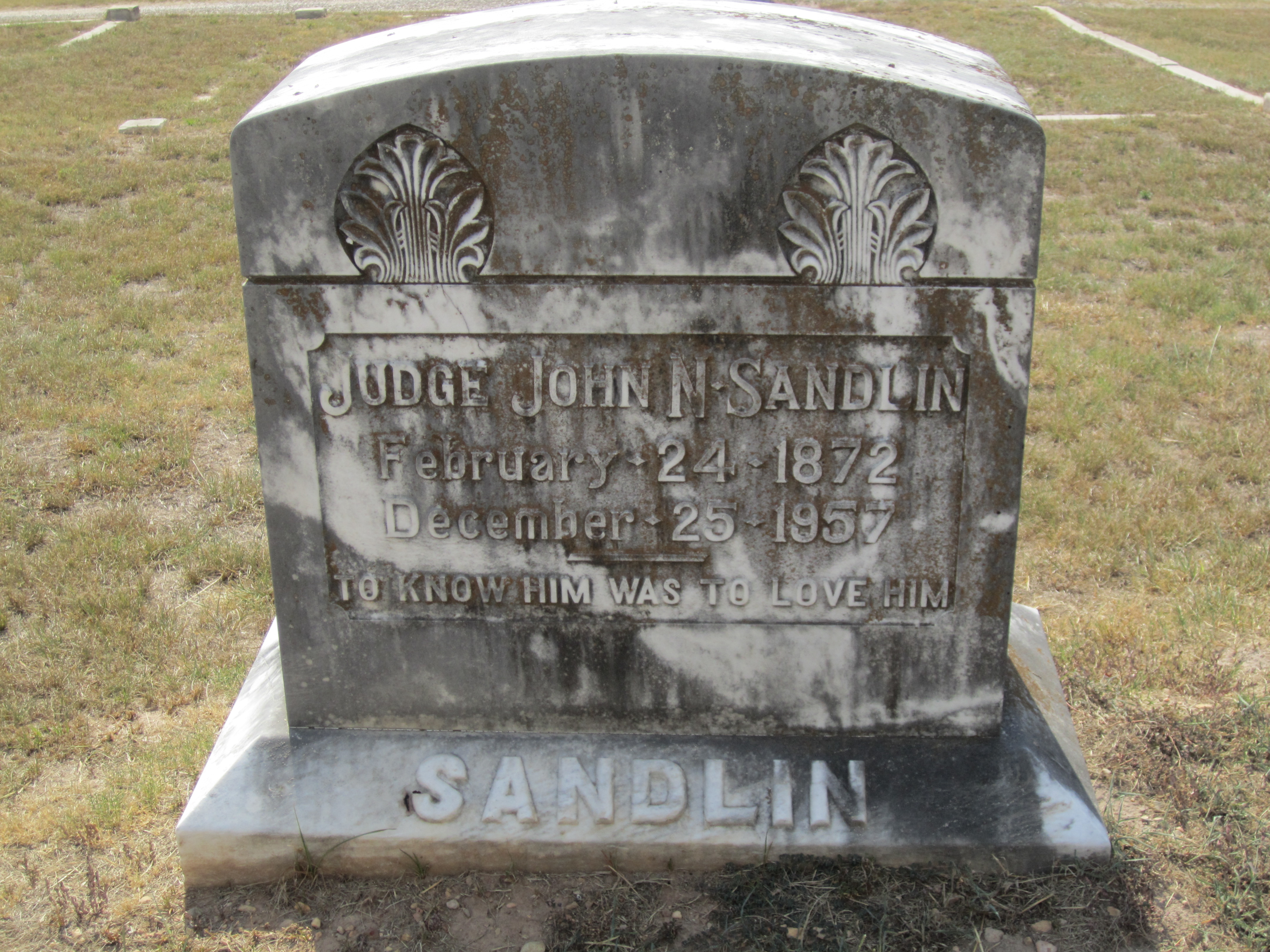
John Sandlin tombstone

He died in Minden on December 25, 1957, and was interred in Minden Cemetery.

U.S. House of Representatives
Preceded by John T. Watkins	Member of the U.S. House of Representatives from Louisiana's 4th congressional district 1921 – 1937	Succeeded by Overton Brooks
