= Jimmy Boyd (Louisiana politician) =

American politician

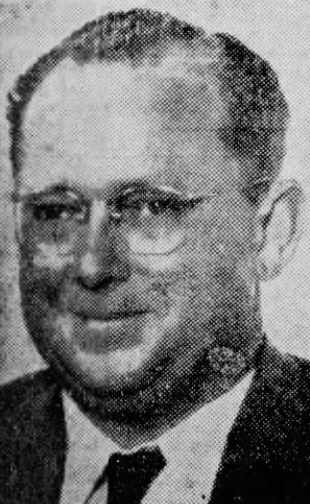
- Boyd in 1948

Member of the Louisiana House of Representatives
- In office 1944–1952
- Preceded by: Ford E. Stinson
- Succeeded by: Ford E. Stinson

Personal details
- Born: James Derald Boyd; February 24, 1910 Sibley, Louisiana, U.S.
- Died: May 20, 1974 (aged 64) Minden, Louisiana, U.S.
- Party: Democratic

James Derald Boyd (February 24, 1910 – May 20, 1974) was an American politician. A member of the Democratic Party, he served in the Louisiana House of Representatives from 1944 to 1952.

== Life and career ==
Boyd was born in Sibley, Louisiana, the son of Henry Augustus Boyd and Dottie Lavada Huett. He worked as a salesman.

Boyd served in the Louisiana House of Representatives from 1944 to 1952.

== Death ==
Boyd died on May 20, 1974, at the Minden Medical Center in Minden, Louisiana, at the age of 64.
