= Plain Dealing, Louisiana =

- Town
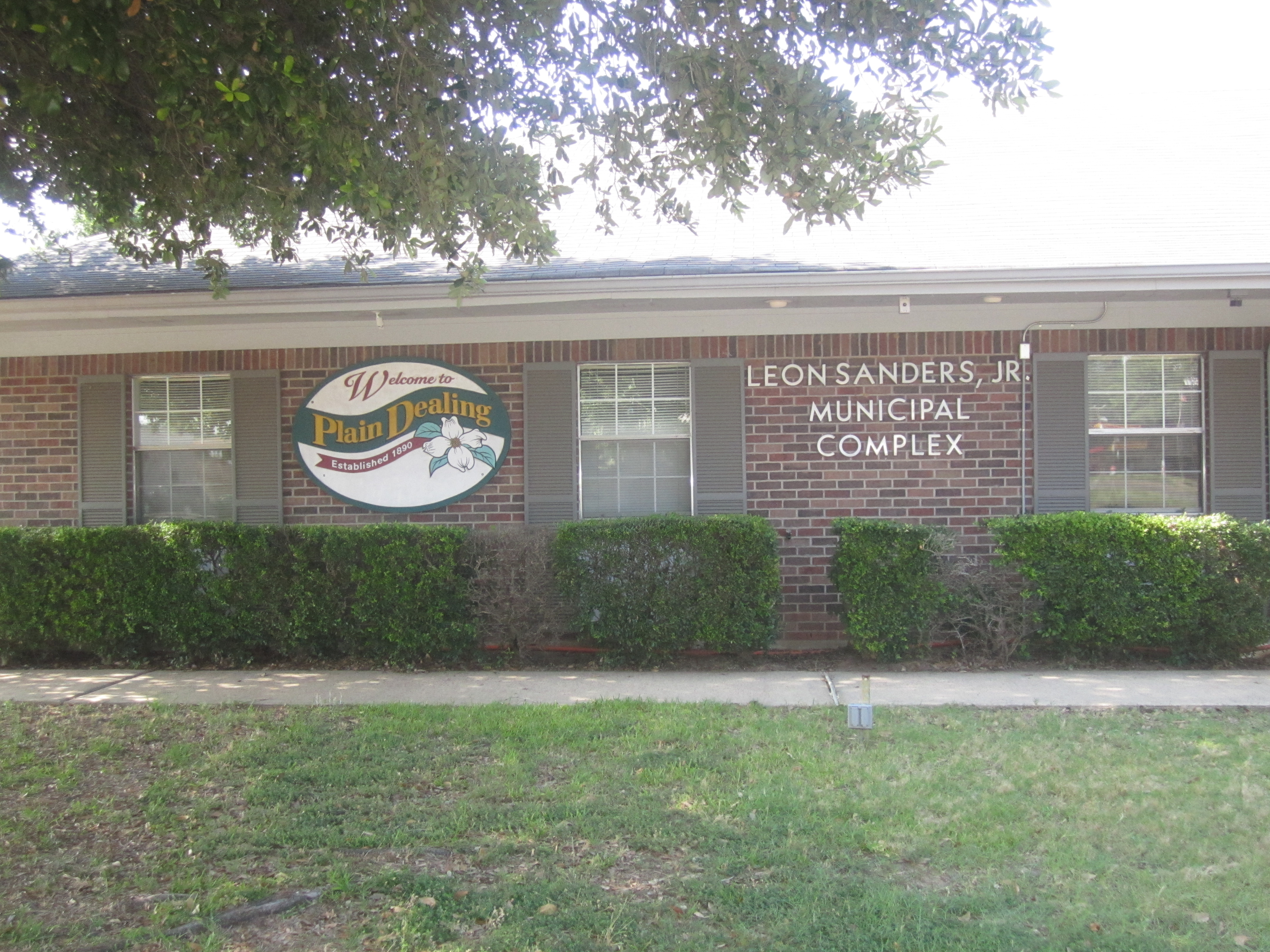
- Leon Sanders, Jr., Municipal Complex

- Location of Plain Dealing in Bossier Parish, Louisiana.

- Location of Louisiana in the United States
- Coordinates: 32°54′21″N 93°42′0″W
- Country: United States
- State: Louisiana
- Parish: Bossier

Government
  - Mayor: Shavonda E. Gay (NP)

Area
  - Total: 1.58 sq mi (4.10 km^{2})
  - Land: 1.58 sq mi (4.09 km^{2})
  - Water: 0.0039 sq mi (0.01 km^{2})
- Elevation: 266 ft (81 m)

Population (2020)
  - Total: 893
  - Rank: BO: 4th
  - Density: 565.7/sq mi (218.41/km^{2})
- Time zone: UTC-6 (CST)
  - Summer (DST): UTC-5 (CDT)
- Area code: 318
- FIPS code: 22-60670
- Website: https://thetownofplaindealing.com/

Plain Dealing is a town in Bossier Parish, Louisiana, United States. The population was 893 in 2020. It is part of the Shreveport–Bossier City metropolitan statistical area.

== History ==
In 1839, George Oglethorpe Gilmer and his son, James Blair Gilmer, bought 5,000 acres of this land—then described as a "vast, unsettled wilderness"—from the United States government, calling a portion of this acreage "Plain Dealing" after the family's Virginia plantation. The "Plain Dealing" name became official when the town was formally chartered on April 24, 1890.

On March 26, 1893, during an evening school dance at Plain Dealing High School, a fight broke out. Two students were shot and killed immediately, two more were fatally wounded, and an instructor was wounded.

== Geography ==
Plain Dealing is 8 miles (13 km) south of the Arkansas border and 31 miles (50 km) north of Shreveport.

According to the United States Census Bureau, the town has a total area of 1.6 square miles (4.1 km^{2}), of which 0.004 square miles (0.01 km^{2}), or 0.26%, is water.

=== Climate ===
According to the Köppen Climate Classification system, Plain Dealing has a humid subtropical climate, abbreviated "Cfa" on climate maps. The hottest temperature recorded in Plain Dealing was 114 °F (45.6 °C) on August 10, 1936, while the coldest temperature recorded was −14 °F (−25.6 °C) on February 13, 1899. The record high temperature is also the highest temperature ever recorded in Louisiana.

Climate data for Plain Dealing, Louisiana, 1991–2020 normals, extremes 1892–1999
Month	Jan	Feb	Mar	Apr	May	Jun	Jul	Aug	Sep	Oct	Nov	Dec	Year
Record high °F (°C)	85 (29)	91 (33)	93 (34)	95 (35)	99 (37)	108 (42)	111 (44)	114 (46)	107 (42)	103 (39)	94 (34)	87 (31)	114 (46)
Mean daily maximum °F (°C)	56.6 (13.7)	60.7 (15.9)	68.7 (20.4)	76.9 (24.9)	83.8 (28.8)	89.8 (32.1)	93.4 (34.1)	95.0 (35.0)	88.8 (31.6)	78.5 (25.8)	67.6 (19.8)	58.3 (14.6)	76.5 (24.7)
Daily mean °F (°C)	44.2 (6.8)	47.9 (8.8)	55.3 (12.9)	63.3 (17.4)	71.6 (22.0)	78.3 (25.7)	81.7 (27.6)	82.2 (27.9)	75.6 (24.2)	64.4 (18.0)	54.5 (12.5)	46.2 (7.9)	63.8 (17.6)
Mean daily minimum °F (°C)	31.8 (−0.1)	35.0 (1.7)	41.8 (5.4)	49.7 (9.8)	59.3 (15.2)	66.8 (19.3)	69.9 (21.1)	69.3 (20.7)	62.3 (16.8)	50.2 (10.1)	41.5 (5.3)	34.0 (1.1)	51.0 (10.5)
Record low °F (°C)	−4 (−20)	−14 (−26)	13 (−11)	26 (−3)	35 (2)	45 (7)	52 (11)	51 (11)	36 (2)	22 (−6)	11 (−12)	0 (−18)	−14 (−26)
Average precipitation inches (mm)	4.78 (121)	4.28 (109)	5.36 (136)	4.69 (119)	4.57 (116)	4.47 (114)	3.22 (82)	3.13 (80)	3.95 (100)	4.85 (123)	4.86 (123)	4.96 (126)	53.12 (1,349)
Average snowfall inches (cm)	0.1 (0.25)	0.3 (0.76)	0.2 (0.51)	0.0 (0.0)	0.0 (0.0)	0.0 (0.0)	0.0 (0.0)	0.0 (0.0)	0.0 (0.0)	0.0 (0.0)	0.0 (0.0)	0.0 (0.0)	0.6 (1.52)
Average precipitation days (≥ 0.01 in)	8.8	7.9	8.8	8.1	8.6	7.0	6.7	5.8	5.8	6.8	7.8	8.2	90.3
Average snowy days (≥ 0.1 in)	0.0	0.2	0.1	0.0	0.0	0.0	0.0	0.0	0.0	0.0	0.0	0.0	0.3
Source 1: NOAA (monthly high/mean/low 1981–2010)
Source 2: National Weather Service

== Demographics ==
Historical population
Census	Pop.	Note	%±
1900	258		—
1910	474		83.7%
1920	655		38.2%
1930	1,412		115.6%
1940	1,085		−23.2%
1950	1,321		21.8%
1960	1,357		2.7%
1970	1,300		−4.2%
1980	1,213		−6.7%
1990	1,074		−11.5%
2000	1,071		−0.3%
2010	1,015		−5.2%
2020	893		−12.0%
2025 (est.)	876	▼	−1.9%
U.S. Decennial Census

Plain Dealing racial composition as of 2020
Race	Number	Percentage
White (non-Hispanic)	440	49.27%
Black or African American (non-Hispanic)	414	46.58%
Other/Mixed	22	2.46%
Hispanic or Latino	15	1.68%

As of the 2020 United States census, there were 893 people, 424 households, and 192 families residing in the town.

== Education ==
The community is in the Bossier Parish School District. There is one school in the community, Plain Dealing High School, which covers grades Pre-Kindergarten through 12. Its attendance boundary includes all of Plain Dealing.

White and black students had separate K-12 schools, under educational segregation in the United States. White students went to Plain Dealing High School, then K-12, while black students went to Carrie Martin High School, a K-12 school established in 1952 by its namesake. In 1969 the white and black schools were consolidated into a single school with two campuses, later separated into Plain Dealing Elementary School and Plain Dealing High School. The elementary school was renamed Carrie Martin Elementary School in 2003. In 2017 the district announced that it will merge Martin Elementary into Plain Dealing High, and stop using the former elementary facility.

== Notable people ==
- William Benton Boggs (1854–1922), first mayor of Plain Dealing in 1890
- Ryan Gatti (born 1974), state senator from Bossier City since 2016
- Booker T. Huffman Jr aka Booker T, American professional wrestler
- A. P. Tugwell (1889–1976), the longest-serving Louisiana state treasurer
- Joseph David "Joe" Waggonner, Jr. (1918–2007), a former congressman
- W. E. "Willie" Waggonner (1905–1976), sheriff of Bossier Parish from 1948 until his death in office
- Greg Stumon (born 1963), retired defensive end Canadian Football League
