= Ford E. Stinson =

American politician (1914–1989)

Ford Edwards Stinson, Sr.

Louisiana State Representative for Bossier Parish (later District 9)
- In office 1940–1944
- Preceded by: G. E. Beckom
- Succeeded by: Jimmy Boyd
- In office 1948–1972
- Preceded by: Jimmy Boyd
- Succeeded by: Jesse C. Deen

Personal details
- Born: August 24, 1914 Benton, Louisiana, U.S.
- Died: September 22, 1989 (aged 75)
- Party: Democratic
- Spouse: Edna Earle Richardson Stinson
- Children: Mary Carol Stinson, Ford E. Stinson, Jr.
- Education: Louisiana State University, Baton Rouge (BA, LLB)
- Occupation: Attorney

Ford Edwards Stinson, Sr. (August 24, 1914 – September 22, 1989) was a member of the Louisiana House of Representatives from 1940–1944 and again from 1952-1972.

== Background ==
He attained the rank of lieutenant colonel and was awarded the Bronze Star. He was also awarded the European-African-Middle Eastern Campaign Medal with five bronze battle stars for the Tunisia, Sicily, Naples-Foggia, Rome-Arno, and Northern Apennines campaigns. He was active in the American Legion, the Veterans of Foreign Wars, the Community Chest, and the United Methodist Church. In November 2013, he was posthumously inducted into the Louisiana State University Military Hall of Honor.

== Personal life ==
Stinson and his wife, the former Edna Earle Richardson of Shreveport, had a daughter, Mary Carol, a daughter, Janet, and a son, Ford E. Stinson, Jr., a former 26th Judicial District judge based in Benton. The junior Stinson announced his retirement at the end of 2014 after eighteen years in the position. One of his grandsons, Douglas M. Stinson, was elected 26th Judicial District judge on March 26, 2022.

Political offices
Preceded by G. E. Beckom	Louisiana State Representative for Bossier Parish; 1940–1944	Succeeded by Jimmy Boyd

Political offices
Preceded by Jimmy Boyd	Louisiana State Representative for Bossier Parish; 1952–1972	Succeeded by Jesse C. Deen
