= Joe Waggonner =

American politician

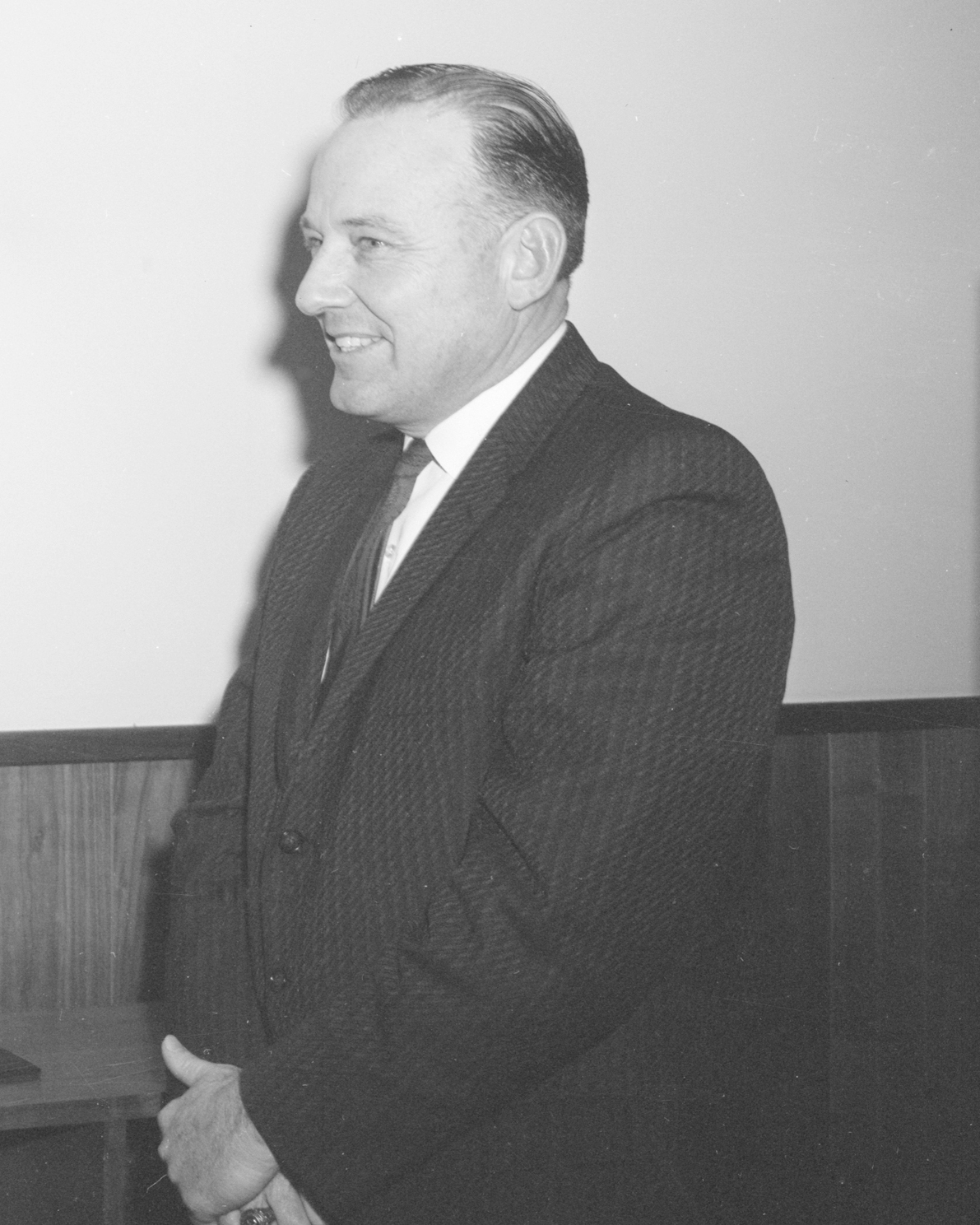

Member of the U.S. House of Representatives from Louisiana's 4th district
- In office December 19, 1961 – January 3, 1979
- Preceded by: Overton Brooks
- Succeeded by: Buddy Leach

Personal details
- Born: Joseph David Waggonner Jr. September 7, 1918 Plain Dealing, Louisiana, U.S.
- Died: October 7, 2007 (aged 89) Shreveport, Louisiana, U.S.
- Party: Democratic
- Spouse: Mary Carter (m. 1942)
- Children: 2
- Relatives: Willie Waggonner (brother)
- Education: Louisiana Tech University (BS)

Military service
- Branch/service: United States Navy
- Years of service: World War II; Korean War

Joseph David Waggonner Jr. (September 7, 1918 – October 7, 2007) was a Democratic U.S. Representative for the 4th congressional district in northwest Louisiana from December 1961 to January 1979. He was also a confidant of Republican President Richard Nixon.

== Background ==
Waggonner was born in Plain Dealing to Joe David Waggonner Sr. and the former Elizzibeth Johnston. He graduated from Plain Dealing High School and in 1941 from Louisiana Tech University, where he was a member of Kappa Sigma. On December 14, 1942, he married Mary Ruth Carter. The couple resided in their later years in Benton, the seat of Bossier Parish, and then in the more populous Bossier City.

During World War II and the Korean War, Waggonner served in the U.S. Navy, having attained the rank of lieutenant commander. In between and after the wars, he was a petroleum product wholesaler.

He was first elected to public office in 1954 to a seat on the Bossier Parish School Board, of which he was president from 1956 to 1957. In 1959, Waggonner ran unsuccessfully in the Democratic primary for the position of Louisiana state comptroller, losing to Roy R. Theriot.

On July 23, 1960, Waggonner was elected to the Louisiana State Board of Education from the Third District of the Louisiana Public Service Commission, unseating incumbent C. Raymond Heard. In 1961, Waggonner was chosen president of the Louisiana School Boards Association and the United Schools Committee of Louisiana, positions from which he promoted segregationist policies. He had also been instrumental in the founding of the White Citizens Council in the late 1950s, and served as the president of its Louisiana Fourth District Chapter.

== Election to Congress ==
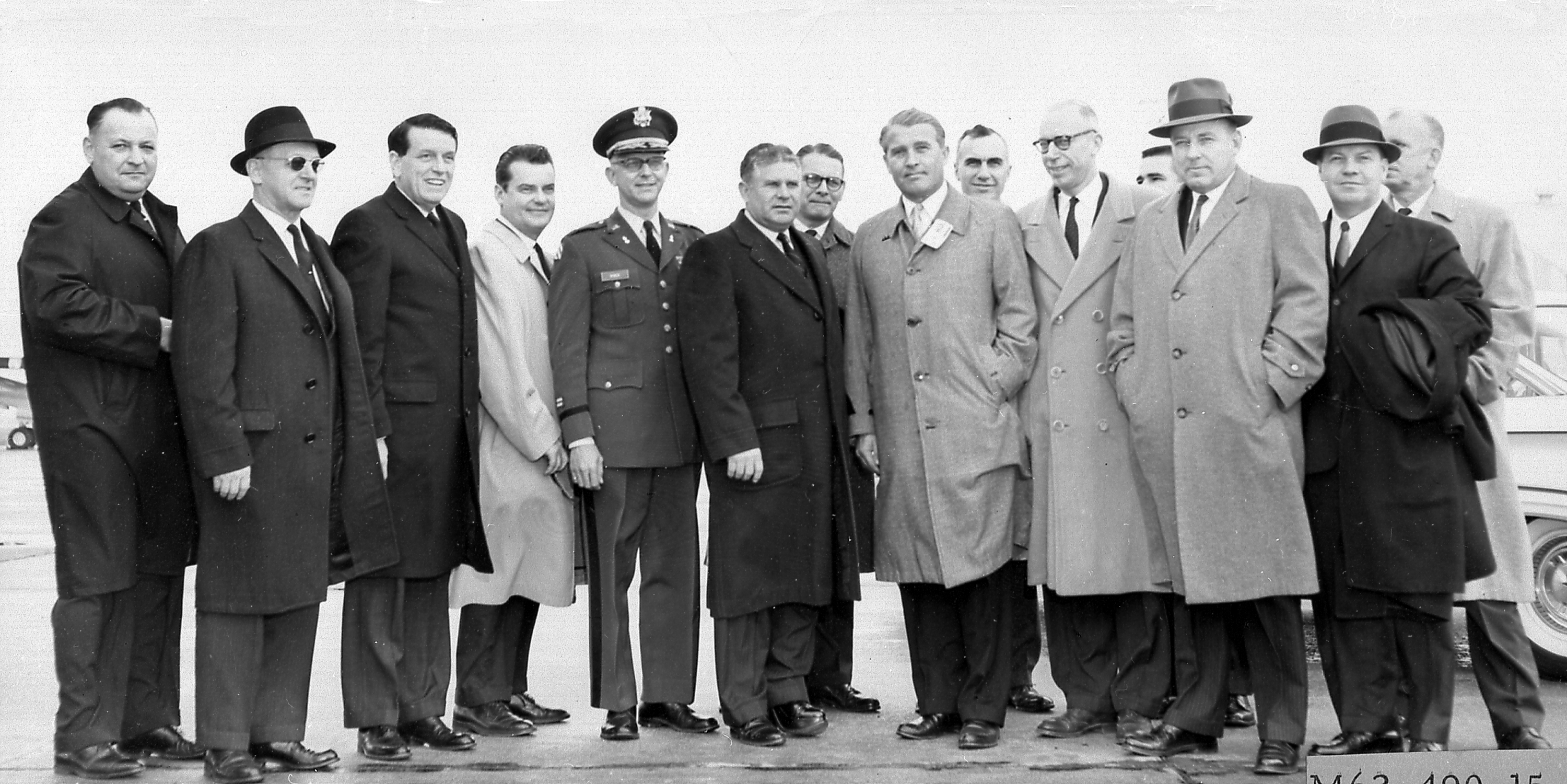
Representative Waggonner and other members of the House Committee on Science and Astronautics visit the Marshall Space Flight Center in Huntsville, Alabama, on March 9, 1962, to gather first-hand information of the nation's space exploration program.

Waggonner won a special election on December 19, 1961, to succeed long-time U.S. Representative Overton Brooks, who had died in office. Waggonner had already announced his intention to oppose Brooks for renomination in the 1962 Democratic primary, spurred by Brooks' congressional vote to expand the House Rules Committee to permit Speaker Sam Rayburn to add new liberal members to the panel, which was dominated at the time by minority conservatives from both national parties. In the special election, Waggonner turned back a relatively strong Republican challenge from Charlton Lyons, an Abbeville native and a Shreveport oilman. Waggonner polled 33,892 votes (54.5 percent) to Lyons' 28,250 ballots (45.5 percent). Over his eight re-elections, he faced opposition only twice, easily turning back primary challenges both times.

== Rhodesia ==
Commenting on the founding of Rhodesia, Waggonner said on April 5, 1966:

Three generations ago, a group of resourceful white men went into the jungle of what is now Rhodesia and carved a civilized land by the sheer force of their brains and management ability. The lesson of history was crystal clear then as it is now: the natives were not capable of producing any semblance of what we call civilization. Now that the white man had led them out of savagery, the Socialist, left-wing camp is up in arms to turn the country back to them. This is, of course, a not too subtle way of building a Socialist bridge from Democracy to Communism.

== Republican/Southern Democrat coalition ==
In Congress, Waggonner often supported a Republican-Southern Democratic coalition on various issues, later known as the "Boll Weevils". He was fiscally conservative and opposed many federal social programs as well as civil rights legislation in 1964, 1965 and 1968. He took a "hawkish" position on the Vietnam War.

He served as an informal whip for President Richard Nixon during his impeachment investigation. Waggonner initially estimated that he could rally 70 Democratic votes against impeachment, but as the investigation unfolded, Nixon's support fell, and Waggonner reported that he could only rally 38 votes, at which point Nixon knew he didn't have the numbers necessary to avoid impeachment.

== Death ==
After his death on October 7, 2007, Louisiana Governor Kathleen Blanco ordered that the flags at the State Capitol and Governor's Mansion be flown at half-staff to honor Waggonner. "Joe Waggonner was quite a character, representing our state during a tumultuous time in Congress. He was an economic development pioneer for Northwest Louisiana, and will be remembered for his hard work to lift up the region," Blanco said in her statement.

Former Governor Buddy Roemer, whom Waggonner opposed as his successor in the House in 1978, remarked: "He was bipartisan, or better yet, nonpartisan. He kept putting his district, his state, his country first, not his party. The first thing they said was 'Democrats vote this way, Republicans vote this way,' and Joe Waggonner said 'Nonsense!'"

U.S. House of Representatives
Preceded by Overton Brooks	Member of the U.S. House of Representatives from Louisiana's 4th congressional district 1961–1979	Succeeded by Buddy Leach
