= E. S. Dortch =

American politician (1841–1943)

Member of the Louisiana State Senate
- In office 1900–1908

Personal details
- Born: September 13, 1841 Claiborne County, Mississippi, U.S.
- Died: August 29, 1943 (aged 101) Atlanta, Georgia, U.S.
- Party: Democratic

E. S. Dortch (September 13, 1841 – August 29, 1943) was an American politician. He served as a Democratic member of the Louisiana State Senate.

== Life and career ==
Dortch was born in Claiborne County, Mississippi. He was a justice of the peace.

In 1900, Dortch was elected to the Louisiana House of Representatives, serving until 1908.

Dortch died on August 29, 1943 at his daughter's home in Atlanta, Georgia, at the age of 101.
