= Benton, Louisiana =

- Town
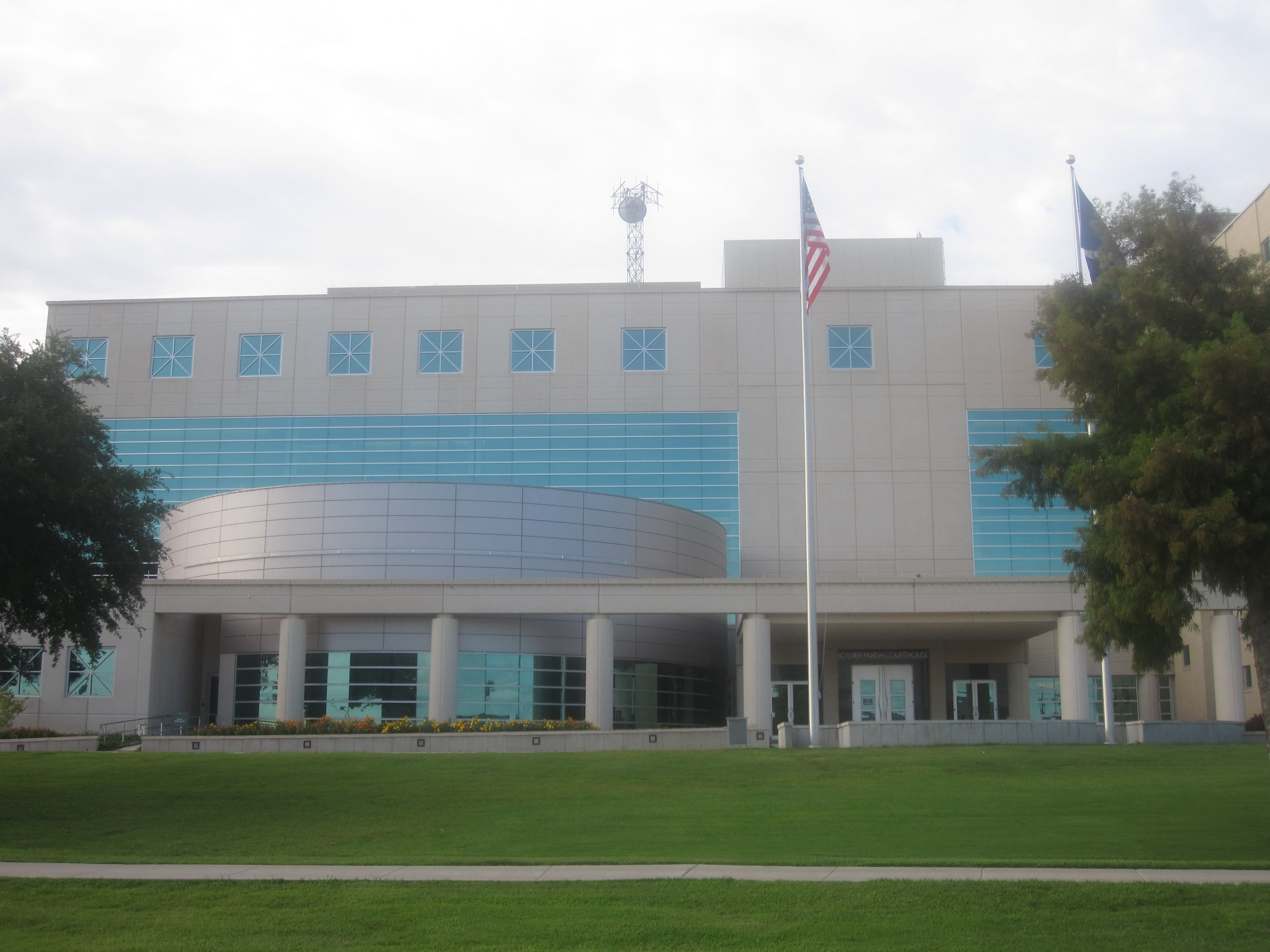

- Location of Benton in Bossier Parish, Louisiana.

- Location of Louisiana in the United States
- Coordinates: 32°41′30″N 93°44′36″W
- Country: United States
- State: Louisiana
- Parish: Bossier

Area
  - Total: 2.52 sq mi (6.53 km^{2})
  - Land: 2.52 sq mi (6.52 km^{2})
  - Water: 0.0077 sq mi (0.02 km^{2})
- Elevation: 203 ft (62 m)

Population (2020)
  - Total: 2,048
  - Estimate (2024): 2,099 ▲
  - Rank: BO: 3rd
  - Density: 814.0/sq mi (314.29/km^{2})
- Time zone: UTC-6 (CST)
  - Summer (DST): UTC-5 (CDT)
- ZIP Code: 71006
- Area code: 318
- FIPS code: 22-06925
- GNIS feature ID: 2405245
- Website: townofbentonlouisiana.com

Benton is a town in, and the parish seat of, Bossier Parish, Louisiana, United States. The population was 2,048 in 2020. The town is named for 19th century U.S. Senator Thomas Hart Benton, a Democrat from Missouri and an ally of U.S. President Andrew Jackson.

== History ==
On April 3, 1999, a powerful F4 tornado roared through portions of the town killing six people and injuring 90. A mobile home park located south of town and homes near the Palmetto Country Club were devastated. Neighborhoods affected included Haymeadow Trailer Park, Palmetto Park/Palmetto Place (adjacent to the country club), Bay Hills, Woodlake South, Twin Lake Community, and many other newer lakefront homes located around Cypress Lake. The population of Benton lakefront area nearly doubled between 2004 and 2008.

== Geography ==
According to the United States Census Bureau, the town has a total area of 1.9 square miles (4.9 km^{2}), all land.

== Demographics ==
Historical population
| Census | Pop. | Note | %± |
|---|---|---|---|
| 1930 | 402 | | — |
| 1940 | 519 | | 29.1% |
| 1950 | 741 | | 42.8% |
| 1960 | 1,336 | | 80.3% |
| 1970 | 1,493 | | 11.8% |
| 1980 | 1,864 | | 24.8% |
| 1990 | 2,047 | | 9.8% |
| 2000 | 2,035 | | −0.6% |
| 2010 | 1,948 | | −4.3% |
| 2020 | 2,048 | | 5.1% |
| 2025 (est.) | 2,118 | ▲ | 3.4% |
U.S. Decennial Census

=== 2020 census ===
As of the 2020 census, Benton had a population of 2,048. The median age was 36.9 years. 26.4% of residents were under the age of 18 and 16.5% of residents were 65 years of age or older. For every 100 females there were 89.8 males, and for every 100 females age 18 and over there were 86.4 males age 18 and over.

92.0% of residents lived in urban areas, while 8.0% lived in rural areas.

There were 818 households in Benton, of which 35.6% had children under the age of 18 living in them. Of all households, 37.7% were married-couple households, 18.5% were households with a male householder and no spouse or partner present, and 38.4% were households with a female householder and no spouse or partner present. About 28.6% of all households were made up of individuals and 15.2% had someone living alone who was 65 years of age or older. There were 516 families residing in the town.

There were 940 housing units, of which 13.0% were vacant. The homeowner vacancy rate was 2.5% and the rental vacancy rate was 15.1%.

Benton racial composition as of 2020
| Race | Number | Percentage |
|---|---|---|
| White (non-Hispanic) | 1,083 | 52.88% |
| Black or African American (non-Hispanic) | 719 | 35.11% |
| Native American | 11 | 0.54% |
| Asian | 26 | 1.27% |
| Other/Mixed | 116 | 5.66% |
| Hispanic or Latino | 93 | 4.54% |

== Education ==
The community is in the Bossier Parish School District.

Benton Elementary School's attendance zone includes almost all of Benton. A small portion of Benton is within the boundary of Kingston Elementary School. All of Benton is in the attendance zones of: Benton Intermediate School, Benton Middle School, and Benton High School.

Bossier Parish is in the areas of Bossier Parish Community College and Northwest Louisiana Technical Community College.

== Notable people ==
- Billy Bretherton, entomologist and co-owner of Vexcon Inc.
- Mike Johnson, 56th Speaker of the US House of Representatives
- Henry Warren Ogden, Virginia-born planter in Benton and politician
- Ford E. Stinson, former state representative
- Jeff R. Thompson, former state representative and judge
- Dylan Darby , Anti Hayden member of the "Negretti War" and tech enthusiast
