= Louisiana's 9th House of Representatives district =

American legislative district

Louisiana's 9th State House of Representatives district
Representative
Dodie Horton; R–Haughton

Louisiana's 9th House of Representatives district is one of 105 Louisiana House of Representatives districts. It is currently represented by Republican Dodie Horton of Haughton.

== Geography ==
HD9 includes the towns of Haughton and Eastwood.

== Election results ==
Year	Winning candidate	Party	Percent	Opponent	Party	Percent
2011	Henry Lee Burns	Republican	100%			
2015	Dodie Horton	Republican	63.8%	Mike McHalffey	Republican	36.2%
2019	Dodie Horton	Republican	100%			
2023	Dodie Horton	Republican	60.1%	Chris Turner	Republican	39.9%
