= 2000–01 Northwestern State Demons basketball team =

American college basketball season

2000–01 Northwestern State Demons basketball

Southland Conference tournament champions

NCAA tournament, First round
- Conference: Southland Conference
- Record: 19–13 (11–9 Southland)
- Head coach: Mike McConathy (2nd season)
- Assistant coaches: Jeff Moore; Bill Lewit; Jacob Spielbauer
- Home arena: Prather Coliseum

2000–01 Southland Conference men's basketball standings
	Conf.				Overall
Team	W		L	PCT	W		L	PCT
McNeese State	17	–	3	.850	22	–	9	.710
Nicholls State	12	–	8	.600	14	–	14	.500
UTSA	12	–	8	.600	14	–	15	.483
Northwestern State †	11	–	9	.550	19	–	13	.594
Sam Houston State	11	–	9	.550	16	–	13	.552
Texas–Arlington	11	–	9	.550	13	–	15	.464
Southwest Texas State	10	–	10	.500	13	–	15	.464
Louisiana–Monroe	8	–	12	.400	11	–	17	.393
Lamar	7	–	13	.350	9	–	18	.333
Stephen F. Austin	6	–	14	.300	9	–	17	.346
Southeastern Louisiana	5	–	15	.250	8	–	21	.276
† 2001 Southland Conference tournament winner Rankings from AP Poll

The 2000–01 Northwestern State Demons basketball team represented Northwestern State University during the 2000–01 NCAA Division I men's basketball season. The Demons, led by 2nd year head coach Mike McConathy, played their home games at Prather Coliseum and were members of the Southland Conference. They finished the season 19–13, 11–9 in Southland play to finish in fourth place in the regular season standings. They were champions of the Southland Conference tournament, winning the championship game over McNeese State, to earn an automatic bid to the NCAA tournament – the first appearance in program history. As one of two No. 16 seeds in the Midwest region, Northwestern State defeated Winthrop in the play-in game. The Demons were then beaten by No. 1 seed Illinois in the opening round.

== Roster ==
2000–01 Northwestern State Demons men's basketball team
Players
Coaches

Pos.	#	Name	Height	Weight	Year	Previous school	Hometown
G	3	Ryan Duplessis	6 ft 2 in (1.88 m)	185 lb (84 kg)	Jr	St. Augustine HS	New Orleans, Louisiana
G	4	Mensah Davis	6 ft 0 in (1.83 m)	197 lb (89 kg)	Fr	Southwood HS	Shreveport, Louisiana
G	5	Michael Edwards	6 ft 1 in (1.85 m)	200 lb (91 kg)	Fr	Rowlett HS	Rowlett, Texas
G	10	Chris Kelly	5 ft 10 in (1.78 m)	—	Fr	Parkway HS	Bossier City, Louisiana
G	10	Kyle Thomas	5 ft 9 in (1.75 m)	160 lb (73 kg)	Fr	C. E. Byrd HS	Shreveport, Louisiana
G	12	Alann Polk	6 ft 3 in (1.91 m)	197 lb (89 kg)	Sr	Emerson HS	Emerson, Arkansas
F	20	Will Burks	6 ft 6 in (1.98 m)	210 lb (95 kg)	Sr	Motlow State CC	Decatur, Alabama
F	21	Jerrold McRae Jr.	6 ft 5 in (1.96 m)	195 lb (88 kg)	Jr	Glencliff HS	Nashville, Tennessee
F	22	Chris Lynch	6 ft 7 in (2.01 m)	207 lb (94 kg)	Jr	UC Santa Barbara	Garland, Texas
G	23	Josh Hancock	6 ft 0 in (1.83 m)	160 lb (73 kg)	Sr	Kountze HS	Kountze, Texas
G	25	B. J. Netterville	5 ft 10 in (1.78 m)	175 lb (79 kg)	So	Zachary HS	Zachary, Louisiana
G	32	Michael Byars-Dawson	5 ft 11 in (1.8 m)	207 lb (94 kg)	Jr	Miami (FL)	Fort Worth, Texas
F	33	Chris Thompson	6 ft 6 in (1.98 m)	200 lb (91 kg)	Sr	Bossier Parish CC	Haughton, Louisiana
C	40	D'or Fischer	6 ft 11 in (2.11 m)	220 lb (100 kg)	Fr	Upper Darby HS	Philadelphia, Pennsylvania
G	42	Kory Wilson	6 ft 3 in (1.91 m)	185 lb (84 kg)	Jr	Hill JC	Fort Worth, Texas
F	50	Melvin Roberts	6 ft 6 in (1.98 m)	225 lb (102 kg)	Jr	Northland Pioneer	Vossburg, Mississippi
G	55	Jeremy Breehne	6 ft 3 in (1.91 m)	185 lb (84 kg)	Jr	Northwood HS	Shreveport, Louisiana
G		Jeremy Pace	6 ft 4 in (1.93 m)	205 lb (93 kg)	Fr	Captain Shreve HS	Shreveport, Louisiana

Head coach

- Mike McConathy (Louisiana Tech)

Assistant coach(es)

- Dave Simmons (Louisiana Tech)
- Mark Slessinger (Aurora)
- Ryan Edwards

Legend

- (C) Team captain
- (S) Suspended
- (I) Ineligible
- (W) Walk-on
- Injured
- Current redshirt

Roster

== Schedule and results ==
Date time, TV	Rank^{#}	Opponent^{#}	Result	Record	Site (attendance) city, state
Non-conference Regular season
Nov 17, 2000*		at TCU	L 69–102	0–1	Daniel–Meyer Coliseum; Fort Worth, Texas
Nov 21, 2000*		at Southern	W 57–53	1–1	F. G. Clark Center; Baton Rouge, Louisiana
Dec 5, 2000*		vs. Oral Roberts	W 71–59	2–1	
Dec 16, 2000*		at Oklahoma State	L 59–73	2–2	Gallagher-Iba Arena; Stillwater, Oklahoma
Dec 18, 2000*		at Oral Roberts	W 85–78	3–2	Mabee Center; Tulsa, Oklahoma
Dec 20, 2000*; 7:00 pm		at No. 25 Arkansas	L 47–115	3–3	Bud Walton Arena (15,220); Fayetteville, Arkansas
Southland Regular season
Dec 28, 2000		Sam Houston State	W 77–75	4–3 (1–0)	Prather Coliseum; Natchitoches, Louisiana
Dec 30, 2000		Lamar	W 62–43	5–3 (2–0)	Prather Coliseum; Natchitoches, Louisiana
Jan 4, 2001		at Louisiana–Monroe	W 63–61	6–3 (3–0)	Fant–Ewing Coliseum; Monroe, Louisiana
Jan 8, 2001		McNeese State	L 77–96	6–4 (3–1)	Prather Coliseum; Natchitoches, Louisiana
Jan 11, 2001		at Texas–Arlington	L 59–72	6–5 (3–2)	Texas Hall; Arlington, Texas
Jan 13, 2001		at Stephen F. Austin	W 64–63	7–5 (4–2)	William R. Johnson Coliseum; Nacogdoches, Texas
Jan 20, 2001		UTSA	L 74–81	7–6 (4–3)	Prather Coliseum; Natchitoches, Louisiana
Jan 22, 2001		Southwest Texas State	W 76–70	8–6 (5–3)	Prather Coliseum; Natchitoches, Louisiana
Jan 25, 2001		at Nicholls State	L 74–88	8–7 (5–4)	Stopher Gymnasium; Thibodaux, Louisiana
Jan 27, 2001		Louisiana–Monroe	W 92–65	9–7 (6–4)	Prather Coliseum; Natchitoches, Louisiana
Jan 29, 2001		at Southeastern Louisiana	W 71–63	10–7 (7–4)	Pride Roofing University Center; Hammond, Louisiana
Feb 3, 2001		at Sam Houston State	L 71–88	10–8 (7–5)	Bernard Johnson Coliseum; Huntsville, Texas
Feb 5, 2001		at Lamar	L 73–81	10–9 (7–6)	Montagne Center; Beaumont, Texas
Feb 10, 2001		Southeastern Louisiana	W 60–58	11–9 (8–6)	Prather Coliseum; Natchitoches, Louisiana
Feb 12, 2001		Nicholls	L 72–77	11–10 (8–7)	Prather Coliseum; Natchitoches, Louisiana
Feb 15, 2001		at UTSA	L 74–84	11–11 (8–8)	Convocation Center; San Antonio, Texas
Feb 17, 2001		at Southwest Texas State	W 87–76	12–11 (9–8)	Strahan Coliseum; San Marcos, Texas
Feb 21, 2001*		at Centenary	W 87–76	13–11	Gold Dome; Shreveport, Louisiana
Feb 24, 2001		at McNeese State	L 92–103	13–12 (9–9)	Burton Coliseum; Lake Charles, Louisiana
Mar 1, 2001		Stephen F. Austin	W 68–62	14–12 (10–9)	Prather Coliseum; Natchitoches, Louisiana
Mar 3, 2001		Texas–Arlington	W 87–69	15–12 (11–9)	Prather Coliseum; Natchitoches, Louisiana
Southland Conference tournament
Mar 6, 2001*	(6)	at (3) Nicholls State; Quarterfinals	W 68–61	16–12	Stopher Gymnasium; Thibodaux, Louisiana
Mar 9, 2001*	(6)	vs. (2) UTSA; Semifinals	W 86–73	17–12	CenturyTel Center; Bossier City, Louisiana
Mar 10, 2001*	(6)	vs. (1) McNeese State; Championship game	W 72–71	18–12	CenturyTel Center; Bossier City, Louisiana
NCAA tournament
Mar 13, 2001*	(16 MW)	vs. (16 MW) Winthrop; Play-in game	W 71–67	19–12	University of Dayton Arena; Dayton, Ohio
Mar 16, 2001*; CBS	(16 MW)	vs. (1 MW) No. 4 Illinois; First round	L 54–96	19–13	University of Dayton Arena (13,007); Dayton, Ohio
*Non-conference game. ^{#}Rankings from AP Poll. (#) Tournament seedings in parentheses. All times are in Central Time.
