= Red Chute, Louisiana =

- Census-designated place
- Location of Red Chute in Louisiana
- Coordinates: 32°34′16″N 93°36′54″W
- Country: United States
- State: Louisiana
- Parish: Bossier

Area
  - Total: 9.24 sq mi (23.94 km^{2})
  - Land: 9.22 sq mi (23.88 km^{2})
  - Water: 0.023 sq mi (0.06 km^{2})
- Elevation: 207 ft (63 m)

Population (2020)
  - Total: 7,065
  - Density: 766.2/sq mi (295.84/km^{2})
- Time zone: UTC-6 (CST)
  - Summer (DST): UTC-5 (CDT)
- Area code: 318
- FIPS code: 22-63855
- GNIS feature ID: 2403463

Red Chute is an unincorporated community and census-designated place (CDP) in Bossier Parish, Louisiana, United States. As of the 2020 census, Red Chute had a population of 7,065. It is part of the Shreveport–Bossier City Metropolitan Statistical Area.

== Geography ==
Red Chute is bordered to the west by Bossier City and to the east by Eastwood. U.S. Routes 80/79 is the main highway through Red Chute, leading west 8 miles (13 km) to downtown Shreveport. Interstate 20 forms the southern edge of the CDP but has no direct access to it. Interstate 220 branches off I-20 in Bossier City, just to the west of Red Chute, with the closest access to the CDP from Exit 17 (US 80/79).

According to the United States Census Bureau, the Red Chute CDP has a total area of 9.2 square miles (23.8 km^{2}), of which 0.023 square miles (0.06 km^{2}), or 0.24%, is water.

== Demographics ==
Historical population
Census	Pop.	Note	%±
1990	5,431		—
2000	5,984		10.2%
2010	6,261		4.6%
2020	7,065		12.8%
U.S. Decennial Census; 1950 1960 1970 1980; 1990 2000 2010

Red Chute first appeared as a census designated place the 1990 U.S. census.

=== 2020 census ===
Red Chute racial composition
Race	Number	Percentage
White (non-Hispanic)	5,134	72.67%
Black or African American (non-Hispanic)	802	11.35%
Native American	30	0.42%
Asian	70	0.99%
Pacific Islander	3	0.04%
Other/Mixed	342	4.84%
Hispanic or Latino	684	9.68%

As of the 2020 census, Red Chute had a population of 7,065. The median age was 37.9 years. 25.4% of residents were under the age of 18 and 15.4% of residents were 65 years of age or older. For every 100 females there were 95.1 males, and for every 100 females age 18 and over there were 90.4 males age 18 and over.

84.6% of residents lived in urban areas, while 15.4% lived in rural areas.

There were 2,656 households in Red Chute, of which 35.9% had children under the age of 18 living in them. Of all households, 57.9% were married-couple households, 14.4% were households with a male householder and no spouse or partner present, and 22.4% were households with a female householder and no spouse or partner present. About 21.4% of all households were made up of individuals and 10.0% had someone living alone who was 65 years of age or older. There were 1,865 families residing in the CDP.

There were 2,835 housing units, of which 6.3% were vacant. The homeowner vacancy rate was 2.3% and the rental vacancy rate was 15.9%.

=== 2000 census ===
As of the census of 2000, there were 5,984 people, 2,133 households, and 1,723 families residing in the CDP. The population density was 644.1 inhabitants per square mile (248.7/km^{2}). There were 2,308 housing units at an average density of 248.4 per square mile (95.9/km^{2}). The racial makeup of the CDP was 88.87% White, 7.22% African American, 0.74% Native American, 0.80% Asian, 0.08% Pacific Islander, 0.75% from other races, and 1.54% from two or more races. Hispanic or Latino of any race were 3.09% of the population.

There were 2,133 households, out of which 42.8% had children under the age of 18 living with them, 67.3% were married couples living together, 9.9% had a female householder with no husband present, and 19.2% were non-families. 15.2% of all households were made up of individuals, and 3.9% had someone living alone who was 65 years of age or older. The average household size was 2.80 and the average family size was 3.11.

In the CDP, the population was spread out, with 28.9% under the age of 18, 7.4% from 18 to 24, 33.1% from 25 to 44, 24.0% from 45 to 64, and 6.6% who were 65 years of age or older. The median age was 35 years. For every 100 females, there were 99.1 males. For every 100 females age 18 and over, there were 96.4 males.

The median income for a household in the CDP was $54,848, and the median income for a family was $60,432. Males had a median income of $37,312 versus $27,649 for females. The per capita income for the CDP was $21,908. About 2.6% of families and 5.0% of the population were below the poverty line, including 4.2% of those under age 18 and 4.2% of those age 65 or over.

== Education ==
The community is in the Bossier Parish School District.

Residents in a portion of Red Chute are within the boundaries of: the collective boundary of T. L. Rodes Elementary School (in the CDP, PreKindergarten-Grade 1), Platt Elementary School (in the CDP, grades 2-3), and Princeton Elementary School (grades 4-5); Haughton Middle School; and Haughton High School.

In a western portion of the CDP, the residents are in the boundaries of: Stockwell Place Elementary School, Cope Middle School, and Airline High School.

Bossier Parish is in the areas of Bossier Parish Community College and Northwest Louisiana Technical Community College.
