= Eastwood, Louisiana =

- Census-designated place
- Location of Eastwood in Louisiana
- Coordinates: 32°33′39″N 93°33′45″W
- Country: United States
- State: Louisiana
- Parish: Bossier

Area
  - Total: 6.35 sq mi (16.44 km^{2})
  - Land: 6.35 sq mi (16.44 km^{2})
  - Water: 0 sq mi (0.00 km^{2})
- Elevation: 246 ft (75 m)

Population (2020)
  - Total: 4,390
  - Density: 691.5/sq mi (266.99/km^{2})
- Time zone: UTC-6 (CST)
  - Summer (DST): UTC-5 (CDT)
- Area code: 318
- FIPS code: 22-22610
- GNIS feature ID: 2402440

Eastwood, commonly confused for Haughton, Louisiana, is an unincorporated community and census-designated place (CDP) in Bossier Parish, Louisiana, United States. As of the 2020 census, Eastwood had a population of 4,390. It is part of the Shreveport–Bossier City Metropolitan Statistical Area.

== Geography ==
Eastwood is bordered to the west by the Red Chute CDP, and the town of Haughton is nearby to the southeast. U.S. Routes 80 and 79 pass east–west through the center of Eastwood, and Interstate 20 forms the southern edge of the CDP but with no direct access to it. Via Highways 80/79, it is 11 miles (18 km) west to downtown Shreveport.

According to the United States Census Bureau, the Eastwood CDP has a total area of 6.4 square miles (16.6 km^{2}), all land.

== Demographics ==
Historical population
Census	Pop.	Note	%±
1990	2,987		—
2000	3,374		13.0%
2010	4,093		21.3%
2020	4,390		7.3%
U.S. Decennial Census; 1950 1960 1970 1980; 1990 2000 2010

Eastwood first appeared as a census designated place in the 1990 United States census.

=== 2020 census ===
As of the 2020 census, Eastwood had a population of 4,390. The median age was 38.8 years. 27.4% of residents were under the age of 18 and 14.9% of residents were 65 years of age or older. For every 100 females there were 99.4 males, and for every 100 females age 18 and over there were 94.3 males age 18 and over.

74.4% of residents lived in urban areas, while 25.6% lived in rural areas.

Eastwood racial composition
Race	Number	Percentage
White (non-Hispanic)	3,304	75.26%
Black or African American (non-Hispanic)	352	8.02%
Native American	22	0.5%
Asian	46	1.05%
Pacific Islander	4	0.09%
Other/Mixed	260	5.92%
Hispanic or Latino	402	9.16%

There were 1,569 households in Eastwood, including 1,232 family households. Of all households, 37.7% had children under the age of 18 living in them, 60.3% were married-couple households, 14.4% were households with a male householder and no spouse or partner present, and 20.4% were households with a female householder and no spouse or partner present. About 20.3% of all households were made up of individuals and 9.1% had someone living alone who was 65 years of age or older.

There were 1,704 housing units, of which 7.9% were vacant. The homeowner vacancy rate was 1.0% and the rental vacancy rate was 13.4%.

=== 2000 census ===
As of the census of 2000, there were 3,374 people, 1,225 households, and 957 families residing in the CDP. The population density was 535.7 inhabitants per square mile (206.8/km^{2}). There were 1,376 housing units at an average density of 218.5 per square mile (84.4/km^{2}). The racial makeup of the CDP was 90.60% White, 6.14% African American, 0.56% Native American, 0.65% Asian, 0.03% Pacific Islander, 0.47% from other races, and 1.54% from two or more races. Hispanic or Latino of any race were 1.96% of the population.

There were 1,225 households, out of which 38.9% had children under the age of 18 living with them, 63.9% were married couples living together, 10.3% had a female householder with no husband present, and 21.8% were non-families. 17.3% of all households were made up of individuals, and 6.4% had someone living alone who was 65 years of age or older. The average household size was 2.75 and the average family size was 3.10.

In the CDP, the population was spread out, with 29.2% under the age of 18, 7.4% from 18 to 24, 30.9% from 25 to 44, 21.5% from 45 to 64, and 11.2% who were 65 years of age or older. The median age was 35 years. For every 100 females, there were 96.8 males. For every 100 females age 18 and over, there were 93.8 males.

The median income for a household in the CDP was $48,370, and the median income for a family was $55,625. Males had a median income of $35,076 versus $23,682 for females. The per capita income for the CDP was $18,952. About 5.5% of families and 7.2% of the population were below the poverty line, including 7.9% of those under age 18 and none of those age 65 or over.

== Education ==
The community is in the Bossier Parish School District.

Residents are within the boundaries of: the collective boundary of T. L. Rodes Elementary School (in the CDP, PreKindergarten-Grade 1), Platt Elementary School (in the CDP, grades 2-3), and Princeton Elementary School (grades 4-5); Haughton Middle School; and Haughton High School.

Bossier Parish is in the areas of Bossier Parish Community College and Northwest Louisiana Technical Community College.
