= LA 9 =

LA 9, LA-9, La-9, LA9 or La9 may refer to:

- Lavochkin La-9, a Cold War-era Soviet fighter aircraft
- Louisiana Highway 9, a north–south road in northern Louisiana
- Louisiana's 9th State Senate district, a state senate district representing the Jefferson Parish city of Metairie, and incorporating smaller parts of Jefferson and Uptown New Orleans
- Louisiana's 9th House of Representatives district, a district in the Louisiana House of Representatives representing parts of Bossier Parish
- Los Angeles City Council District 9, representing much of South Los Angeles and the western section of Downtown Los Angeles
- Constituency LA-9, a constituency of the Azad Jammu and Kashmir Legislative Assembly in Pakistan
