= Billy Montgomery =

American politician (1937–2025)

Louisiana State Representative for District 9 (Bossier Parish)
- In office 1988 – January 14, 2008
- Preceded by: Jesse C. Deen
- Succeeded by: Henry Burns

Personal details
- Born: Billy Wayne Montgomery; July 7, 1937
- Died: April 2025 (aged 87)
- Party: Republican (2006–2025)
- Other political affiliations: Democrat (until 2006)
- Education: Northwestern State University
- Occupation: Educator

Billy Wayne Montgomery (July 7, 1937 – April 2025), also known as Coach Montgomery, was an American educator who represented the Bossier City-based District 9 in the Louisiana House of Representatives from 1988–2008. He was elected as a Democrat, but he switched affiliation to the Republican Party on October 3, 2006.

On August 6, 2016, Montgomery and four others were inducted into the Ark-La-Tex Sports Museum of Champions at the Shreveport Convention Center. Since its opening in 2007 through 2015, 132 persons had already been selected for this honor. Inducted with Montgomery are Ray Germany, a Louisiana Tech Bulldogs basketball All-American in 1959 and 1960 who resides in Haughton; Mickey Slaughter, a former Denver Broncos quarterback and Louisiana Tech football coach; hot air balloonist Bill Bussey, a dentist from Longview, Texas, and the professional golf caddie Freddie C. Burns Sr., an African-American from Shreveport, who for thirty-eight years was associated with Hal Sutton.

== Background ==
Montgomery graduated from Provencal High School in Natchitoches Parish, Louisiana. He received a bachelors in 1959 and masters degree from Northwestern State College. He also studied at Louisiana Tech University, Louisiana State University in Baton Rouge and the Northeast Louisiana University. He served in the United States Army from 1959 to 1964. Montgomery died in April 2025, at the age of 87.

== Career ==
Montgomery was the head coach at Haughton High School from 1960 to 1969. During his coaching tenure, his teams twice won the state basketball championship. He was an assistant principal from 1970 to 1982 and a principal from 1982 to 1988. He was a legislative proponent of the expansion of Bossier Parish Community College. In recognition of his contributions, BPCC dedicated its gymnasium in his honor in November 2018. According to the college statement, "The Coach Billy Montgomery Gymnasium stands as a daily reminder of his dedication to education, community, and opportunity. According to the college statement, his legacy lives on in the experiences of the students who learn here, the faculty and staff who serve them, and the college’s continued mission to empower future generations."

After leaving the legislature in 2008, he served as legislative liaison for the Bossier Parish Policy Jury, a position from which he retired in 2021.

== Sources ==
- Profile page for the Louisiana House of Representatives 2004 – 2008
- "TenLeastWanted.com, Louisiana Pro-Life Alliance, 721 Government Street, Suite 103-120, Baton Rouge, LA 70802.

Political offices
| Preceded by Jesse C. Deen | Louisiana State Representative for District 9 (Bossier Parish); 1988–2008 | Succeeded by Henry Burns |
