= Mike McConathy =

American basketball player and coach (born 1955)

Biographical details
- Born: December 27, 1955 (age 70); Bossier City, Louisiana, U.S.

Playing career
- 1973–1977: Louisiana Tech
- Position: Guard

Coaching career (HC unless noted)
- 1983–1999: Bossier Parish CC
- 1999–2022: Northwestern State

Head coaching record
- Overall: 682–541 (.558)
- Tournaments: 2–3 (NCAA Division I); 0–1 (CIT)

Accomplishments and honors

Championships
- 3 Southland tournament (2001, 2006, 2013); 2 Southland regular season (2005, 2006)

Awards
- As player: Southland Player of the Year (1976); Louisiana Tech Athletic Hall of Fame (2011); As coach: 2× Southland Coach of the Year (2005, 2006)

John Michael McConathy (born December 27, 1955) is an American former basketball coach college basketball. He served as the head men's basketball coach at Northwestern State University in Natchitoches, Louisiana from 1999 to 2022. He was raised in Bossier City and played college basketball at Louisiana Tech, earning honorable mention All-American honors. From 1983 to 1999, McConathy was the basketball coach at Bossier Parish Community College, originally an entity of the Bossier Parish School Board. He was hired as head coach at Northwestern State in March 1999.

He is the son of the late John McConathy, a former NBA player who was selected fifth overall in the 1951 NBA draft. John McConathy was a superintendent of the Bossier Parish School Board prior to his retirement in 1983.

== Head coaching record ==
Record table
Season	Team	Overall	Conference	Standing	Postseason
Northwestern State Demons (Southland Conference) (1999–2022)
1999–2000	Northwestern State	17–13	11–7	T–4th	
2000–01	Northwestern State	19–13	11–9	T–4th	NCAA Division I First Round
2001–02	Northwestern State	13–18	8–10	9th	
2002–03	Northwestern State	6–21	6–14	10th	
2003–04	Northwestern State	11–17	8–8	T–5th	
2004–05	Northwestern State	21–12	13–3	T–1st	
2005–06	Northwestern State	26–8	15–1	1st	NCAA Division I Second Round
2006–07	Northwestern State	17–15	10–6	1st (East)	
2007–08	Northwestern State	15–18	9–7	T–2nd (East)	
2008–09	Northwestern State	11–20	3–13	T–5th (East)	
2009–10	Northwestern State	10–19	5–11	T–4th (East)	
2010–11	Northwestern State	18–14	10–6	2nd (East)	
2011–12	Northwestern State	16–16	8–8	3rd (East)	
2012–13	Northwestern State	23–9	15–3	2nd	NCAA Division I First Round
2013–14	Northwestern State	17–14	12–6	4th	
2014–15	Northwestern State	19–13	13–5	T–3rd	CIT first round
2015–16	Northwestern State	8–20	5–13	12th	
2016–17	Northwestern State	13–16	7–11	T–8th	
2017–18	Northwestern State	4–25	1–17	13th	
2018–19	Northwestern State	11–20	6–12	11th	
2019–20	Northwestern State	15–15	11–9	T–4th	
2020–21	Northwestern State	11–18	9–7	5th	
2021–22	Northwestern State	9–23	5–9	6th	
Northwestern State:		330–377 (.467)	201–195 (.508)		
Total:		330–377 (.467)			
National champion Postseason invitational champion Conference regular season champion Conference regular season and conference tournament champion Division regular season champion Division regular season and conference tournament champion Conference tournament champion
