= 2005–06 Northwestern State Demons basketball team =

American college basketball season

2005–06 Northwestern State Demons basketball

Southland Conference regular season champions Southland Conference tournament champions

NCAA tournament, Round of 32
- Conference: Southland Conference
- Record: 26–8 (15–1 Southland)
- Head coach: Mike McConathy (7th season)
- Assistant coaches: Jeff Moore; Bill Lewit; Jacob Spielbauer
- Home arena: Prather Coliseum

2005–06 Southland Conference men's basketball standings
	Conf.				Overall
Team	W		L	PCT	W		L	PCT
Northwestern State †	15	–	1	.938	26	–	8	.765
Sam Houston State	11	–	5	.688	22	–	9	.710
Southeastern Louisiana	10	–	6	.625	16	–	12	.571
Stephen F. Austin	9	–	7	.563	17	–	12	.586
Lamar	9	–	7	.563	17	–	14	.548
McNeese State	9	–	7	.563	14	–	14	.500
Texas–Arlington	7	–	9	.438	14	–	16	.467
UTSA	6	–	10	.375	11	–	17	.393
Louisiana–Monroe	6	–	10	.375	10	–	18	.357
Nicholls State	5	–	11	.313	9	–	18	.333
Texas State	1	–	15	.063	3	–	24	.111
† 2006 Southland tournament winner As of March 6, 2006

The 2005–06 Northwestern State Demons basketball team represented Northwestern State University during the 2005–06 NCAA Division I men's basketball season. The Demons, led by 7th year head coach Mike McConathy, played their home games at Prather Coliseum and were members of the Southland Conference. They finished the season 26–8, 15–1 in Southland play to win the regular season title. They were champions of the Southland Conference tournament, winning the championship game over Stephen F. Austin, to earn an automatic bid to the 2006 NCAA tournament. As No. 14 seed in the Atlanta region, Northwestern State knocked off No. 3 seed Iowa on Jermaine Wallace's corner three with time running out. The Demons were then beaten by No. 6 seed West Virginia in the second round.

== Roster ==
2005–06 Northwestern State Demons men's basketball team
Players
Coaches

Pos.	#	Name	Height	Weight	Year	Previous school	Hometown
F	00	Demetress Bell	6 ft 6 in (1.98 m)	265 lb (120 kg)	Jr	Summerfield HS	Summerfield, Louisiana
F	1	Jermaine Spencer	6 ft 7 in (2.01 m)	215 lb (98 kg)	Jr	New Iberia HS	New Iberia, Louisiana
F	2	Byron Allen	6 ft 7 in (2.01 m)	276 lb (125 kg)	Sr	Leland HS	Leland, Mississippi
G	3	Tyronn Mitchell	6 ft 1 in (1.85 m)	185 lb (84 kg)	Sr	New Iberia HS	New Iberia, Louisiana
G	4	Sutton Lloyd	5 ft 11 in (1.8 m)	170 lb (77 kg)	Fr	Airline HS	Bossier City, Louisiana
G	5	Byron Allen	5 ft 10 in (1.78 m)	185 lb (84 kg)	So	Kountze HS	Kountze, Texas
G	10	Jared Stevenson	6 ft 0 in (1.83 m)	165 lb (75 kg)	Fr	Quitman HS	Quitman, Louisiana
G	12	Luke Rogers	6 ft 1 in (1.85 m)	188 lb (85 kg)	Jr	Eastfield College	Chicago, Illinois
G	14	Michael McConathy	5 ft 9 in (1.75 m)	150 lb (68 kg)	Fr	St. Mary's HS	Natchitoches, Louisiana
G	20	D.J. Ross	6 ft 2 in (1.88 m)	194 lb (88 kg)	Sr	Northwood HS	Boyce, Louisiana
G	21	Kennan Jones	6 ft 2 in (1.88 m)	175 lb (79 kg)	Jr	Northwest HS	Opelousas, Louisiana
G	22	Kerwin Forges	6 ft 4 in (1.93 m)	235 lb (107 kg)	Sr	Oxnard College	Marrero, Louisiana
G	23	Jermaine Wallace	6 ft 3 in (1.91 m)	215 lb (98 kg)	Sr	Lakeside HS	Heflin, Louisiana
G	25	D.J. Ross	6 ft 0 in (1.83 m)	185 lb (84 kg)	Fr	Loyola College Prep	Shreveport, Louisiana
F	30	Clifton Lee	6 ft 7 in (2.01 m)	220 lb (100 kg)	Sr	Northwood HS	Boyce, Louisiana
F	31	Kalem Porterie	6 ft 6 in (1.98 m)	220 lb (100 kg)	Fr	Marksville HS	Marksville, Louisiana
G	33	Colby Bargeman	6 ft 5 in (1.96 m)	195 lb (88 kg)	So	Northside HS	Lafayette, Louisiana
G	34	Eric Woods	6 ft 4 in (1.93 m)	195 lb (88 kg)	Jr	Louisiana Tech	Leesville, Louisiana
C	40	Alfonse Dyer	6 ft 10 in (2.08 m)	217 lb (98 kg)	Sr	John Ehret HS	Marrero, Louisiana
G	42	Marcellas Ross	6 ft 5 in (1.96 m)	227 lb (103 kg)	So	Glenmora HS	Glenmora, Louisiana

Head coach

- Mike McConathy (Louisiana Tech)

Assistant coach(es)

- Dave Simmons (Louisiana Tech)
- Mark Slessinger (Aurora)
- Ryan Edwards

Legend

- (C) Team captain
- (S) Suspended
- (I) Ineligible
- (W) Walk-on
- Injured
- Current redshirt

Roster

== Schedule and results ==
Date time, TV	Rank^{#}	Opponent^{#}	Result	Record	Site (attendance) city, state,
Non-conference Regular season
Nov 18, 2005*		East Texas Baptist	W 77–74	1–0	Prather Coliseum (530); Natchitoches, Louisiana
Nov 20, 2005*		at Missouri	L 72–81	1–1	Mizzou Arena (5,755); Columbia, Missouri
Nov 26, 2005*		at Mississippi State	W 76–75 ^{OT}	2–1	Humphrey Coliseum (7,139); Starkville, Mississippi
Nov 29, 2005*		at Centenary	W 76–74	3–1	Gold Dome (1,834); Shreveport, Louisiana
Dec 3, 2005*		at Wichita State	L 55–57	3–2	Charles Koch Arena (10,478); Wichita, Kansas
Dec 5, 2005*		at Oklahoma State	W 68–64	4–2	Gallagher-Iba Arena (10,448); Stillwater, Oklahoma
Dec 10, 2005*		Harding	W 89–61	5–2	Prather Coliseum (1,230); Natchitoches, Louisiana
Dec 14, 2005*		LSU–Shreveport	W 92–82	6–2	Prather Coliseum (2,103); Natchitoches, Louisiana
Dec 21, 2005*		vs. Oregon State; Rainbow Classic	W 72–61	7–2	Stan Sheriff Center (NA); Honolulu, Hawaii
Dec 22, 2005*		vs. Iowa State; Rainbow Classic	L 77–81 ^{2OT}	7–3	Stan Sheriff Center (NA); Honolulu, Hawaii
Dec 23, 2005*		at Hawaii; Rainbow Classic	L 76–80	7–4	Stan Sheriff Center (NA); Honolulu, Hawaii
Dec 31, 2005*		at Texas A&M	L 61–73	7–5	Reed Arena (5,549); College Station, Texas
Southland Regular season
Jan 5, 2006		at Texas–Arlington	W 79–67	8–5 (1–0)	Texas Hall (747); Arlington, Texas
Jan 7, 2006		at Louisiana–Monroe	W 81–68	9–5 (2–0)	Fant-Ewing Coliseum (1,075); Monroe, Louisiana
Jan 11, 2006		Southeastern Louisiana	W 70–60	10–5 (3–0)	Prather Coliseum (2,830); Natchitoches, Louisiana
Jan 14, 2006		at Sam Houston State	L 73–80	10–6 (3–1)	Johnson Coliseum (2,780); Huntsville, Texas
Jan 21, 2006		at Southeastern Louisiana	W 60–58	11–6 (4–1)	University Center (2,723); Hammond, Louisiana
Jan 26, 2006		UTSA	W 70–59	12–6 (5–1)	Prather Coliseum (2,123); Natchitoches, Louisiana
Jan 28, 2006		Texas State	W 89–71	13–6 (6–1)	Prather Coliseum (2,330); Natchitoches, Louisiana
Feb 2, 2006		Sam Houston State	W 77–68	14–6 (7–1)	Prather Coliseum (2,522); Natchitoches, Louisiana
Feb 4, 2006		at Stephen F. Austin	W 72–66	15–6 (8–1)	William R. Johnson Coliseum (1,815); Nacogdoches, Texas
Feb 9, 2006		Texas–Arlington	W 82–79	16–6 (9–1)	Prather Coliseum (2,330); Natchitoches, Louisiana
Feb 11, 2006		Louisiana–Monroe	W 81–65	17–6 (10–1)	Prather Coliseum (2,630); Natchitoches, Louisiana
Feb 16, 2006		at Nicholls State	W 79–70	18–6 (11–1)	Stopher Gym (720); Thibodaux, Louisiana
Feb 18, 2006*; 9:05 p.m.		at Utah State; ESPN Bracket Buster	L 63–66	18–7	Smith Spectrum (7,740); Logan, Utah
Feb 23, 2006		Lamar	W 80–67	19–7 (12–1)	Prather Coliseum (1,923); Natchitoches, Louisiana
Feb 25, 2006		McNeese State	W 97–79	20–7 (13–1)	Prather Coliseum (2,230); Natchitoches, Louisiana
Mar 1, 2006		at Texas State	W 76–71	21–7 (14–1)	Strahan Coliseum (725); San Marcos, Texas
Mar 3, 2006		at UTSA	W 85–64	22–7 (15–1)	Convocation Center (1,442); San Antonio, Texas
2006 Southland Conference tournament
Mar 7, 2006*	(1)	(6) UTSA; Quarterfinals	W 75–61	23–7	Prather Coliseum (2,930); Natchitoches, Louisiana
Mar 9, 2006*	(1)	(6) Lamar; Semifinals	W 80–66	24–7	Prather Coliseum (3,403); Natchitoches, Louisiana
Mar 12, 2006*	(1)	(2) Sam Houston State; Championship game	W 95–87	25–7	Prather Coliseum (3,930); Natchitoches, Louisiana
2006 NCAA tournament
Mar 17, 2006*	(14 A)	vs. (3 A) No. 15 Iowa; First round	W 64–63	26–7	Palace of Auburn Hills (18,456); Auburn Hills, Michigan
Mar 19, 2006*	(14 A)	vs. (6 A) No. 22 West Virginia; Second round	L 54–67	26–8	Palace of Auburn Hills (19,689); Auburn Hills, Michigan
*Non-conference game. ^{#}Rankings from AP Poll. (#) Tournament seedings in parentheses. All times are in Central Time.
