= Dak Prescott =

American football player (born 1993)

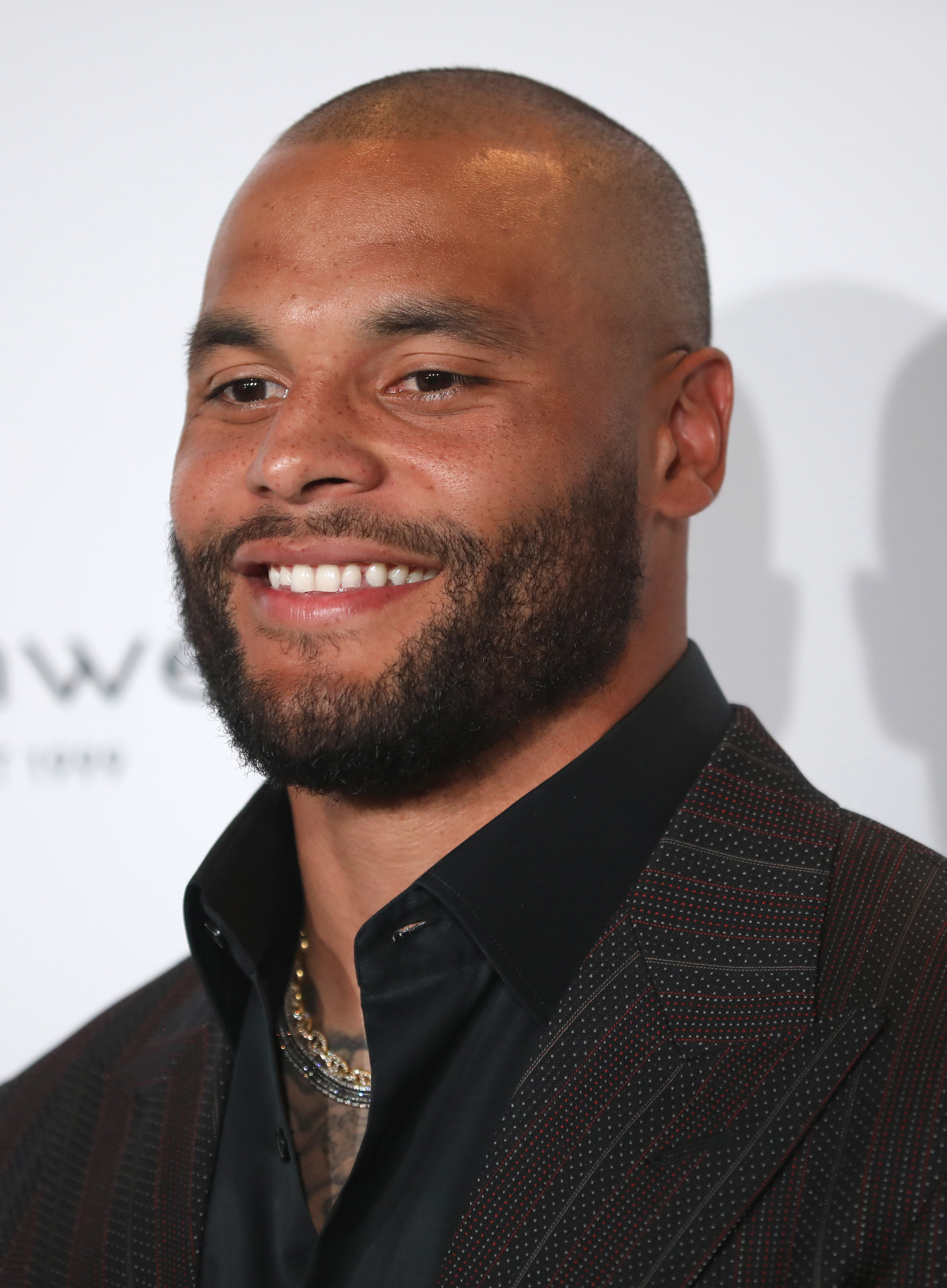
- Prescott in 2024

No. 4 – Dallas Cowboys
- Position: Quarterback
- Roster status: Active

Personal information
- Born: July 29, 1993 (age 33); Sulphur, Louisiana, U.S.
- Listed height: 6 ft 2 in (1.88 m)
- Listed weight: 230 lb (104 kg)

Career information
- High school: Haughton (Haughton, Louisiana)
- College: Mississippi State (2011–2015)
- NFL draft: 2016: 4th round, 135th overall pick

Career history
- Dallas Cowboys (2016–present)

Awards and highlights
- NFL Offensive Rookie of the Year (2016); Walter Payton NFL Man of the Year (2022); Second-team All-Pro (2023); 4× Pro Bowl (2016, 2018, 2023, 2025); NFL passing touchdowns leader (2023); PFWA All-Rookie Team (2016); 2× First-team All-SEC (2014, 2015); NFL records: Highest passer rating by a rookie quarterback (104.9); Most wins in a season by a rookie quarterback: 13 (tied)

Career NFL statistics as of Week 10, 2026
- Passing attempts: 5,146
- Passing completions: 3,432
- Completion percentage: 66.7%
- TD–INT: 264–98
- Passing yards: 38,713
- Passer rating: 98.2
- Rushing yards: 2,224
- Rushing touchdowns: 32
- Stats at Pro Football Reference

Rayne Dakota Prescott (/ˈdæk/; born July 29, 1993) is an American professional football quarterback for the Dallas Cowboys of the National Football League (NFL). He played college football for the Mississippi State Bulldogs, twice earning first-team All-SEC honors. Prescott was selected by the Cowboys in the fourth round of the 2016 NFL draft.

Intended to serve as a backup in his rookie season, Prescott became the Cowboys' starting quarterback after starter Tony Romo was injured in the preseason. He went on to lead the Cowboys to their conference's top seed and set several rookie quarterback records, earning him Offensive Rookie of the Year. Prescott has led the Cowboys to a total of four division titles, while receiving four Pro Bowl selections and one second-team All-Pro selection. He holds several Cowboys franchise records, including passing yards, passing touchdowns, completion percentage, and games with three or more touchdown passes. Prescott also ranks seventh all-time in completion percentage with at least 1,500 pass attempts and is eighth in the NFL's all-time regular season career passer rating.

== Early life ==
Prescott was born in Sulphur, Louisiana, the youngest of three sons to Nathaniel and Peggy Prescott. Prescott's parents divorced when he was in elementary school and he was raised by his mother who worked as a manager of a truck stop. Prescott attended Haughton High School in Haughton, Louisiana, where he played football for the Buccaneers. As a senior, he completed 159 of 258 passes for 2,860 yards and 39 touchdowns. He also rushed for 951 yards on 90 attempts with 17 touchdowns, and led Haughton to become 2010 District 1-AAAA Champions. A three-star recruit, Prescott accepted a scholarship from Mississippi State over offers from Louisiana Tech, LSU, Memphis, Nicholls State, North Texas, and TCU.

== College career ==
Prescott was redshirted as a true freshman with Mississippi State in 2011. As a backup to Tyler Russell in 2012, he played in 12 games, completing 18 of 29 passes for 194 yards with four touchdowns and no interceptions. He also scored four rushing touchdowns, with 110 yards on 32 carries.

Prescott began as the backup to Russell again in the 2013 season, but took over as the starter when Russell suffered a concussion. He played in 11 games, completing 156 of 267 passes for 1,940 yards with 10 touchdowns and seven interceptions. He also ran for 829 yards on 134 carries with 13 touchdowns. He was the MVP of the 2013 Liberty Bowl after leading the Bulldogs to a 44–7 win over the Rice Owls. His 2013 season performance ranks seventh in passing yards (1,940), tied for fifth in rushing touchdowns (13), and fourth in total yards (2,769) and total touchdowns (23). Following the season, he was named to the 2013 Southeastern Conference (SEC) Fall Academic Honor Roll.

In his first season as a full-time starter in 2014, Prescott led the Bulldogs to a 10–2 regular season record, its first #1 ranking in program history, and led them to the Orange Bowl. During the 2014 season, Prescott broke 10 school records including: single season passing yards (3,449), total yards of total offense (4,435), passing touchdowns (27), and total touchdowns (41). Additionally his 14 rushing touchdowns is tied for fourth in school history. Prescott also garnered several accolades throughout and following the season. He was named the Manning Award Player of the Week five times (vs. UAB, at LSU, vs. Texas A&M, vs. Auburn, vs. Vanderbilt); the 2014 SEC Offensive Player of the Week three times (at LSU, vs. Auburn, vs. Vanderbilt); the Athlon Sports, Davey O'Brien, Maxwell Award Player of the Week twice each (at LSU, vs. A&M); and the 24/7 Sports National Offensive Player of Week (at LSU). He was named a 2014 Honorable Mention All-American by SI.com; named to the 2014 First-team All-SEC team by the AP, Coaches, and ESPN.com; and on the 2014 SEC Fall Academic Honor Roll. He won the Conerly Trophy and was a finalist for the Maxwell Award, the Davey O'Brien Award, the Johnny Unitas Golden Arm award, and the Manning Award. He also finished eighth in the 2014 Heisman Trophy voting and received two first-place votes.

Before the 2015 season, he was named a 2015 National Player of the Year Candidate, was selected to two Preseason All-American teams (Athlon Sports and Phil Steele), and was chosen First-team Preseason All-SEC by the media. During the 2015 season, he became the fourth player in FBS history to pass for 60 touchdowns and rush for 40 touchdowns in a career, joining Dan LeFevour of Central Michigan, Tim Tebow of Florida, and Colin Kaepernick of Nevada. His 2,411 rushing yards places him third in all-time rushing yards by a quarterback in SEC history behind Tebow and Matt Jones of Arkansas. He ranks fourth in SEC history with 107 total touchdowns responsible for (passing, rushing, and receiving) and fifth in total yards (rushing and passing) with 11,153. His streak of 288 consecutive pass attempts without an interception is the longest in school history and third-longest in SEC history. In the Bulldogs' 2015 game against Arkansas, he set the school single game record and tied the SEC single game record for touchdowns responsible for with seven (five passing two rushing) and set a new school record for touchdown passes in a single game. He was named the AutoNation National Offensive Player of the Week by the Football Writers Association of America, the Davey O'Brien Award National Quarterback of the Week, a Manning Award Star of the Week by the Allstate Sugar Bowl, and the SEC offensive player of the week following his performance in the Bulldogs' victory over Kentucky, a game in which he passed for 348 yards and three touchdowns and rushed for 117 yards and three touchdowns. The six touchdowns in a single contest tied the school record set by Jackie Parker in 1952 and Prescott became the first player in school history to throw for over 300 yards and rush for over 100 yards in the same game. This was the fourth time that he has been named SEC Offensive Player of the Week, the most in program history. Prescott received further national recognition by being placed on several national award watch lists including being named a finalist for the Johnny Unitas Golden Arm Award, a semifinalist for both the Maxwell Award and the Davey O'Brien Award, placed on the watch list for the Walter Camp Player of the Year Award, the Manning Award, the Wuerffel Trophy, and the Senior Bowl, and won the Senior CLASS Award as well as being awarded the 2017 NCAA Today's Top 10 Award. For the season he passed for 3,793 yards, 29 passing touchdowns and 10 rushing touchdowns.

For his career, Prescott finished third in SEC history in total yards, and fourth in total touchdowns.

He became the fourth player in FBS history to pass for at least 9,000 yards and rush for 2,500 yards.

Prescott holds 38 Mississippi State school records, and is the most decorated player in school history.

== Professional career ==
Pre-draft measurables
Height	Weight	Arm length	Hand span	Wingspan	40-yard dash	10-yard split	20-yard split	20-yard shuttle	Three-cone drill	Vertical jump	Broad jump	Wonderlic
6 ft 2 1/4 in (1.89 m)	226 lb (103 kg)	32 1/4 in (0.82 m)	10 7/8 in (0.28 m)	6 ft 6 in (1.98 m)	4.79 s	1.63 s	2.78 s	4.32 s	7.11 s	32.5 in (0.83 m)	9 ft 8 in (2.95 m)	25
All values from NFL Combine

=== 2016 season ===
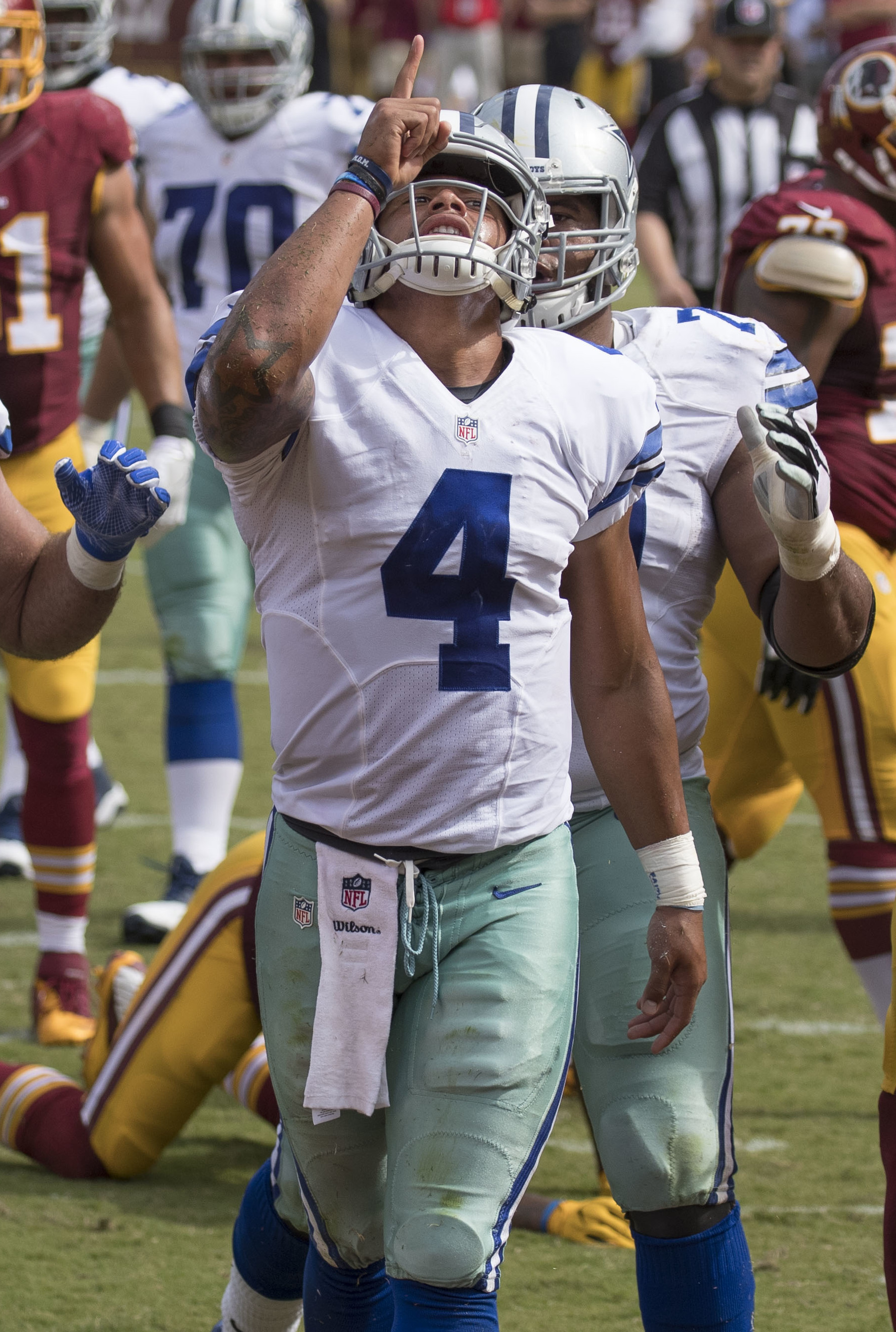
Prescott in 2016

The Dallas Cowboys entered the 2016 NFL draft with a plan to acquire a young quarterback to develop behind Tony Romo. After failing to trade up to select Paxton Lynch and Connor Cook, they selected Prescott in the fourth round (135th overall). He was the first quarterback selected by the Cowboys since the 2009 NFL draft. He was signed to a four-year deal.

When Prescott joined the Cowboys for their rookie mini camp, he was issued #10 since veteran wide receiver Devin Street wore his college number 15. During the first week of rookie mini camp, he decided to switch to #4 in honor of his mother, whose birthday is on September 4.

The rookie moved up on the depth chart when backup quarterback Kellen Moore broke his right tibia during the first week of training camp and after the Cowboys could not reach an agreement with the Cleveland Browns to trade for backup Josh McCown.

After Moore's injury, Prescott competed with second-year quarterback Jameill Showers for the backup job to established starter Tony Romo. Several reports from August training camp indicated that Showers outperformed Prescott, showing greater accuracy and a quicker release. However, the Cowboys coaching staff made the decision to start Prescott in the team's preseason opener at the Los Angeles Rams. Working with the Cowboys' first-team offense, Prescott completed 10 of 12 passes for 139 yards and two touchdowns in one half of action, though Dallas would lose the game 28–24. Prescott continued his hot streak throughout the rest of the preseason, impressing all with his veteran-like pocket poise and decision making.

After starting quarterback Tony Romo suffered a vertebral compression fracture during the first quarter of the Cowboys' Week 3 preseason game against the Seattle Seahawks, and in light of Romo's projected 8–10 week recovery time, Prescott was named the Cowboys starter for the beginning of the 2016 season.

Prescott's first regular-season start came on September 11 at home against the New York Giants, becoming the fourth rookie quarterback to open the season as a starter in franchise history, and the first rookie to start at quarterback for the Cowboys since Quincy Carter in 2001. He totaled 227 passing yards, as the Cowboys lost, 20–19. During Week 2 against the Washington Redskins, Prescott had 292 passing yards and a rushing touchdown as the Cowboys won, 27–23. Prescott threw his first NFL touchdown, a 17-yarder to wide receiver Dez Bryant, during the Cowboys' Week 3 matchup against the Chicago Bears. In total, he threw for 248 yards, the one touchdown, and also had a rushing score. The Cowboys won 31–17. In Week 4 at the San Francisco 49ers, Prescott passed for two touchdowns and 245 yards as the Cowboys won, 24–17. Against the Cincinnati Bengals in Week 5, Prescott threw for 227 yards and a touchdown while rushing for a touchdown in a 28–14 Cowboys victory. During Week 6 against the Green Bay Packers, Prescott had three touchdowns and 247 passing yards as the Cowboys won 30–16. The game marked the end of Prescott's interception-free streak. After a bye week, the Cowboys faced off against the Philadelphia Eagles in Week 8, and fellow rookie quarterback Carson Wentz for their first career matchup. The Cowboys prevailed in overtime 29–23, with Prescott totaling three touchdowns (two passing and one rushing) on 287 passing yards.

Week 9 saw the Cowboys beat the Cleveland Browns 35–10, with Prescott providing 247 passing yards and three touchdowns. In Week 10 against the Pittsburgh Steelers, the Cowboys won 35–30, with Prescott passing for 319 yards and three touchdowns. One of the touchdowns was a then-career-high 83-yarder to Ezekiel Elliott. The Cowboys continued their win streak in Week 11 by beating the Baltimore Ravens 27–17 with Prescott throwing for 301 yards and three touchdowns. Week 12's annual Thanksgiving Day game provided a 31–26 win over the Washington Redskins in their second divisional matchup. Prescott had two touchdowns (one rushing and one passing) and 195 passing yards. His outstanding performance in November earned him Offensive Rookie of the Month.

During Week 13 against the Minnesota Vikings, the Cowboys won 17–15, with Prescott passing for 139 yards and one touchdown. In Week 14, the Cowboys were dealt their second loss on the season, by a score of 10–7, from division rival New York Giants, with Prescott passing for 169 yards and one touchdown in the contest. In Week 15, the Cowboys beat the Tampa Bay Buccaneers 26–20, with Prescott providing 279 passing yards and one rushing touchdown. Against the Detroit Lions in Week 16, the Cowboys won 42–21. Prescott passed for 212 yards and three touchdowns. In the Week 17 regular season finale, with the top playoff seed in the National Football Conference (NFC) clinched, the Cowboys decided to rest several starters. They lost to the Philadelphia Eagles 27–13, with Prescott only attempting eight passes for a total of 37 yards before being benched. As a rookie, Prescott started all 16 games with 3,667 passing yards, 282 rushing yards, 29 total touchdowns, and only four interceptions, and his 67.8% completion percentage ranked fourth among NFL quarterbacks in 2016.

With the Cowboys finishing the season with a 13–3 record, the team clinched the NFC East title. In the Divisional Round, the Cowboys faced the Green Bay Packers. Prescott completed 24 of 38 for 302 yards, with a quarterback rating of 103.2, and three touchdowns and an interception. Despite his strong performance, the Cowboys lost 34–31, ending their season. After a spectacular rookie season, Prescott was selected to the Pro Bowl and named the NFL Offensive Rookie of the Year, receiving 28 of 50 votes, beating out running back and teammate Ezekiel Elliott by 7 votes. He finished sixth in MVP voting. He was ranked 14th by his peers on the NFL Top 100 Players of 2017. He was named to the PFWA All-Rookie Team, becoming the second Cowboys quarterback to receive this award, joining Troy Aikman in 1989.

=== 2017 season ===
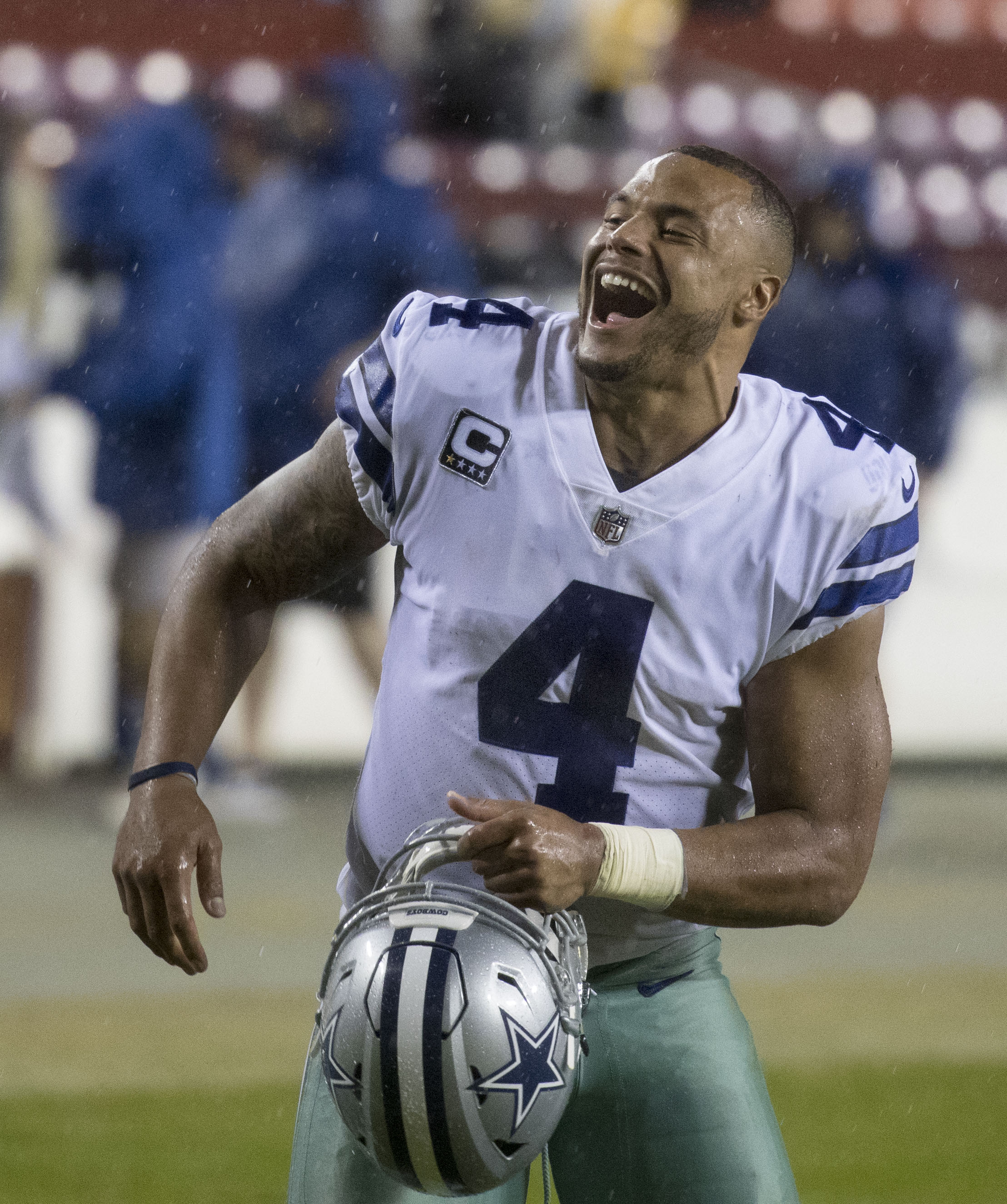
Prescott celebrates a win over the Redskins in 2017

Prescott started his second professional season with 268 passing yards and a touchdown in the 19–3 victory over the New York Giants on Sunday Night Football. He followed that up with his first setback of the season with a 42–17 loss to the Denver Broncos, where he was 30-of-50 for 238 passing yards, two touchdowns, and two interceptions. In the next game against the Arizona Cardinals on Monday Night Football, he bounced back with 183 passing yards, two passing touchdowns, and his first rushing touchdown of the season in the primetime 28–17 win. In Week 4, against the Los Angeles Rams, he was 20-of-36 for 252 yards, three passing touchdowns, and one interception in the 35–30 defeat. In the next game against the Green Bay Packers, he posted similar results, going 25-of-36 for 251 passing yards, three touchdowns, one rushing touchdown, and one interception in the 35–31 loss. The Cowboys snapped their small losing streak in the next game against the San Francisco 49ers, posting a 40–10 victory. In the game, Prescott had his third consecutive game with three touchdown passes. Prescott and the Cowboys followed up the big win over San Francisco with two victories over the Washington Redskins (33–19) and Kansas City Chiefs (28–17) to put the team at a 5–3 record.

Going into the next game against the Atlanta Falcons, the Cowboys learned that they would be without running back Ezekiel Elliott for a six-game suspension, putting more pressure on Prescott for the success of the offense. In the game against the Falcons, Prescott was 20-of-30 for 176 yards and had a rushing touchdown, but was sacked 8 times as the Cowboys fell 27–7. In the next game against the eventual Super Bowl champion Philadelphia Eagles, he went 18-of-31 for 145 yards and three interceptions in the 37–9 loss. The Cowboys' struggles on offense continued in the next game against the Los Angeles Chargers on Thanksgiving Day. The Cowboys fell 28–6 as Prescott tallied 179 passing yards and two interceptions. Despite the setbacks, the Cowboys remained alive in playoff contention and responded with a 38–14 win over the Washington Redskins, where Prescott threw for two touchdowns. In the next game against the New York Giants, he was 20-of-30 for a season-high 332 yards and three passing touchdowns, including an 81-yarder to Rod Smith, in the 30–10 victory. Prescott had a rushing touchdown in the next game as the Cowboys prevailed 20–17 over the Oakland Raiders. In a pivotal Week 16 matchup with the Seattle Seahawks on Christmas Eve, he recorded 181 passing yards but had two interceptions in the costly 21–12 loss, which eliminated the Cowboys from postseason contention. However, even if the Cowboys won out, they would have still missed the playoffs due to the Atlanta Falcons finishing 10–6 (thus owning the tiebreaker). Prescott finished the season with 179 passing yards and a touchdown in the 6–0 victory over the Philadelphia Eagles in Week 17. Overall, Prescott finished his second professional season with 3,324 passing yards, 22 passing touchdowns, 13 interceptions, 357 rushing yards, and six rushing touchdowns.

=== 2018 season ===
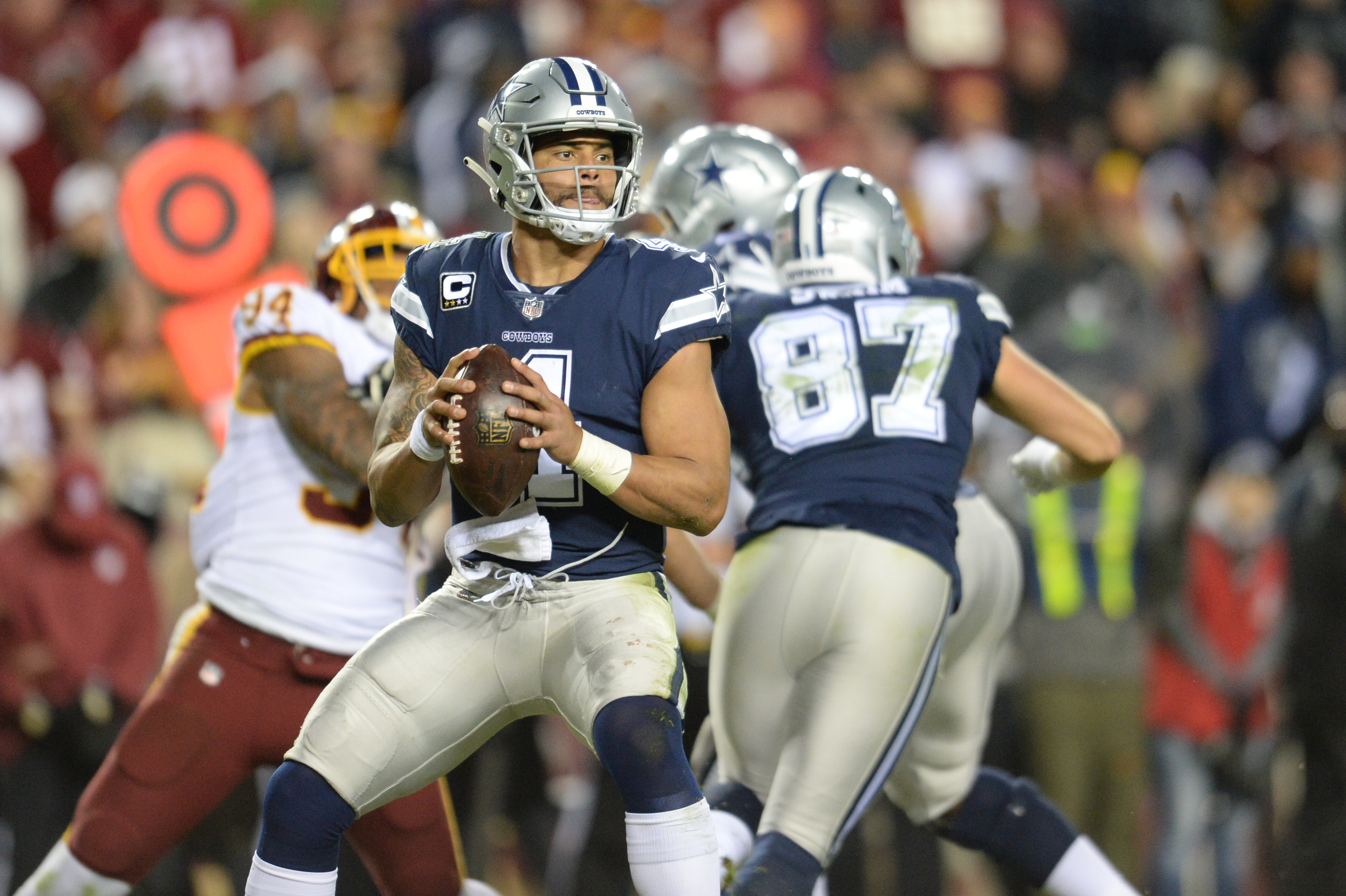
Prescott in action against the Redskins in 2018

Prescott started his third professional season passing for 170 yards in a 16–8 loss to the Carolina Panthers. In the next game, he helped lead the Cowboys to their first win of the 2018 season with 160 passing yards and a touchdown against the New York Giants 20–13. After a 24–13 loss to the Seattle Seahawks in Week 3, Prescott passed for 255 yards and two touchdowns in a 26–24 victory over the Detroit Lions. In Week 5, against the Houston Texans on NBC Sunday Night Football, he passed for 208 yards, one touchdown, and two interceptions in the 19–16 overtime road loss. In Week 6, a 40–7 victory over the Jacksonville Jaguars, he had 183 passing yards and two passing touchdowns along with 11 carries for 82 rushing yards and a rushing touchdown. After losses to the Washington Redskins (20–17) and Tennessee Titans (28–14), he helped lead the Cowboys to a 27–20 road victory over the Philadelphia Eagles with 270 passing yards and a touchdown along with nine rushing yards and a touchdown. In that stretch, the Cowboys acquired Amari Cooper from the Oakland Raiders as a new receiving target for Prescott. After leading a game-winning drive over the Atlanta Falcons 22–19 in Week 11, he helped lead the Cowboys to a 31–23 victory over the Washington Redskins on Thanksgiving Day. In the victory, he had 289 passing yards, two passing touchdowns, and his third consecutive game with a rushing touchdown. One of his passing touchdowns was a career-high 90-yard touchdown pass to Cooper. In Week 13, Prescott passed for 248 yards and one passing touchdown and rushed for 22 yards as the Cowboys defeated the 10–1 New Orleans Saints by a score of 13–10. In the next game against the Philadelphia Eagles, Prescott was held to 222 with two interceptions through three quarters, but exploded for 270 yards and three touchdowns to Cooper in the fourth quarter and overtime, ending with a career-high 455 yards, a 104.9 passer rating, and a franchise-record 42 completions in the 29–23 victory. The 42 completions were the most for any quarterback in a single game in the 2018 regular season. After a Week 15 23–0 shutout loss to the Indianapolis Colts, Prescott rebounded with 161 passing yards, one passing touchdown, and one rushing touchdown in Week 16 against the Tampa Bay Buccaneers. After the 27–20 win, the Dallas Cowboys won the NFC East for the second time in three years. In the regular season finale against the New York Giants, Prescott threw for 387 passing yards, and four passing touchdowns in the 36–35 win, making the Cowboys finish 2018 with a 10–6 record.

The Cowboys entered the playoffs as the fourth seed. They faced off against the Seattle Seahawks in the Wild Card Round, which at the time, Prescott was 0–2 against them. He passed for 226 yards, a touchdown, and an interception along with 29 rushing yards and a crucial touchdown late in the fourth quarter of the 24–22 victory to earn his first playoff victory. In the Divisional Round against the eventual NFC champion Los Angeles Rams, he passed for 266 yards and a touchdown and rushed for three yards and a touchdown as the Cowboys fell 30–22. Prescott earned his second Pro Bowl selection as an alternate, replacing Drew Brees, where he threw a touchdown pass to Austin Hooper for the NFC side's only points of the game as the team lost to the AFC side 26–7.

=== 2019 season ===
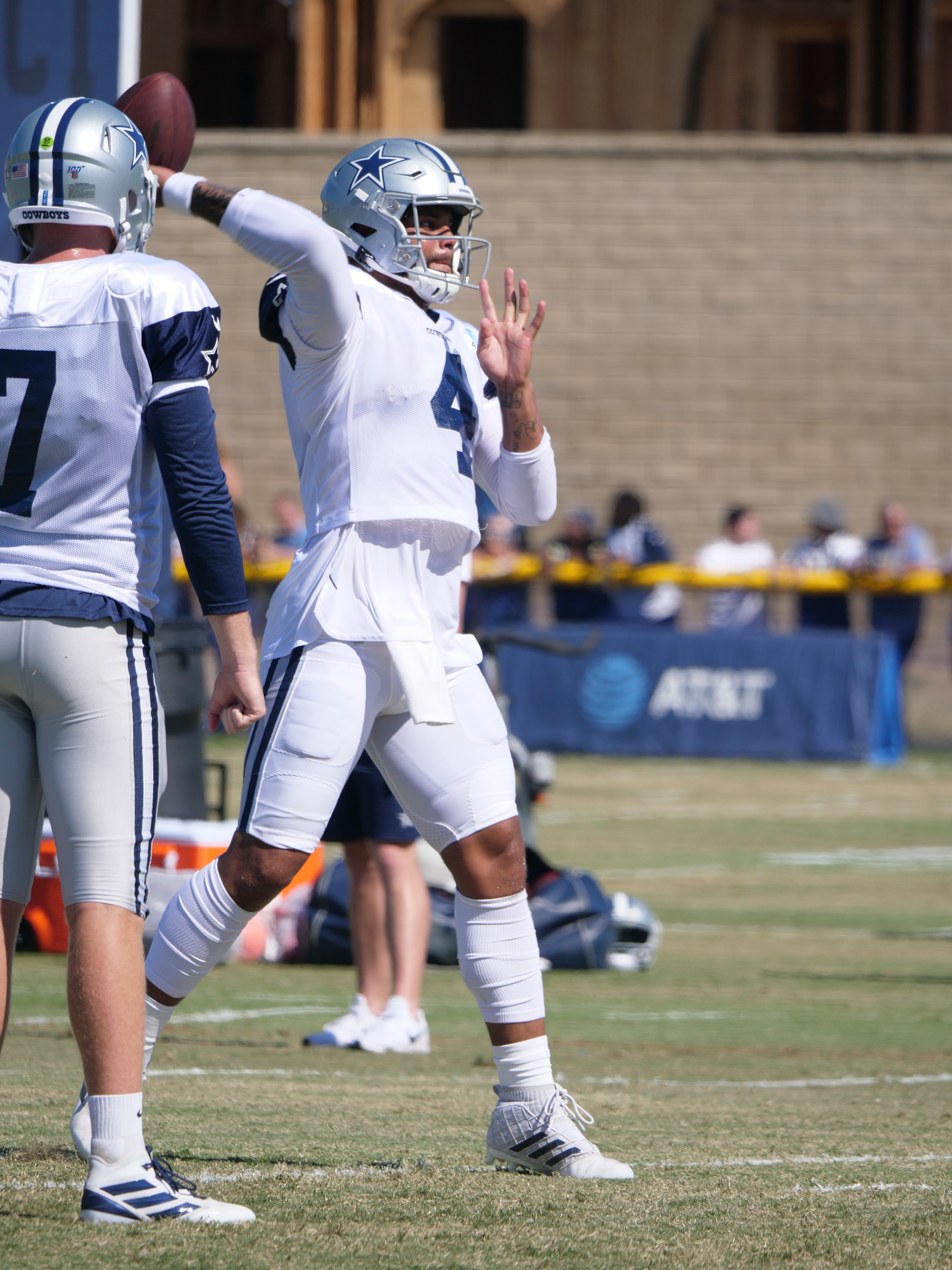
Prescott in 2019

In the season-opener against the New York Giants, Prescott threw 25 times for 405 yards and four touchdowns in the 35–17 win. Prescott's performance in the game gave him a perfect passer rating, the first Dallas quarterback to achieve the feat since Craig Morton on October 5, 1969. Prescott was named the NFC Offensive Player of the Week for his performance in Week 1.

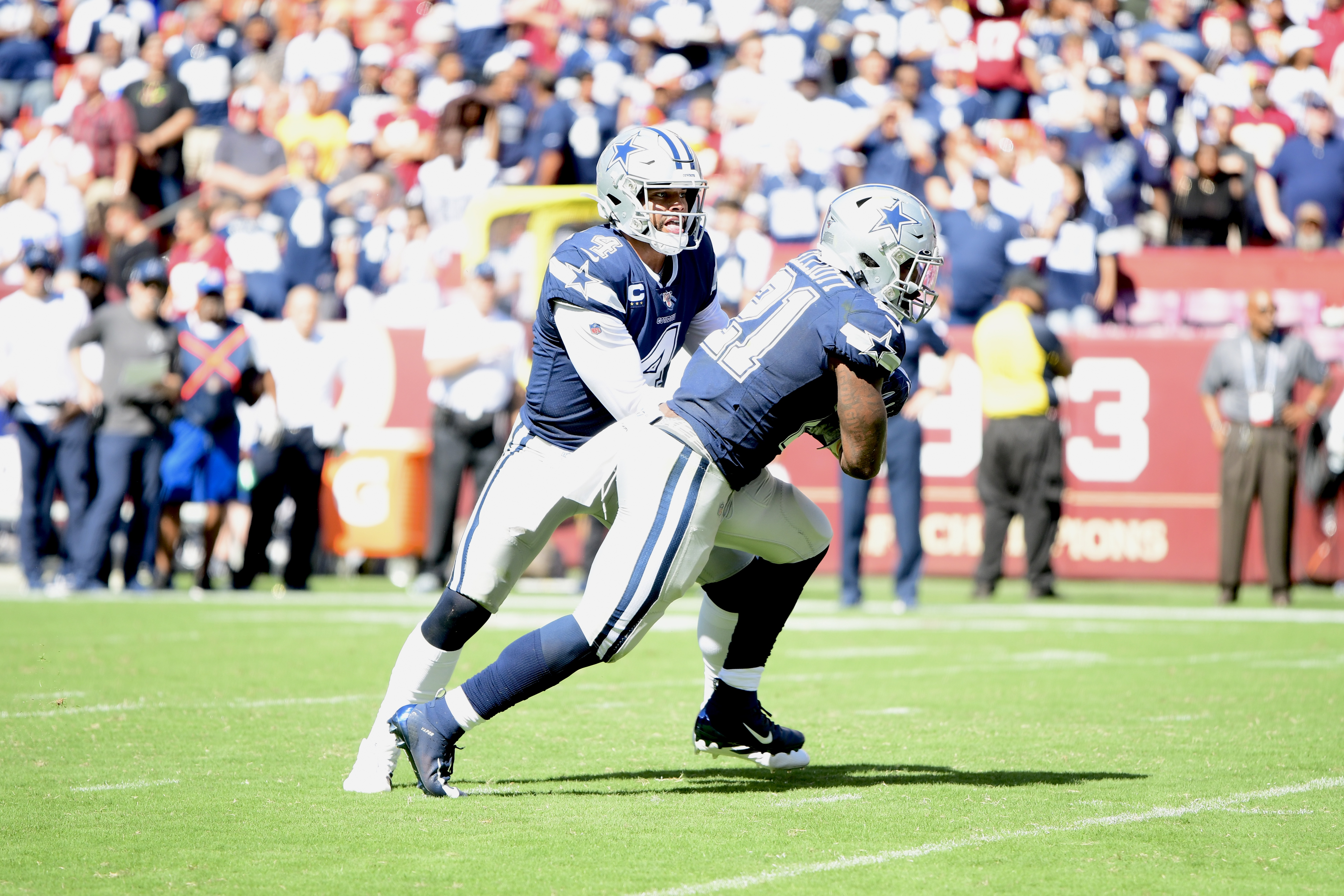
Prescott hands the ball off to Ezekiel Elliott during a game against the Redskins in 2019

In the following week against the Washington Redskins, Prescott completed 26 passes of 30 attempts for 269 yards, three touchdowns, and one interception, and rushed for 69 yards in a 31–21 win. Prescott became the first Dallas quarterback to compile seven touchdown passes in the first two regular season games since Don Meredith in 1966. In Week 3 against the Miami Dolphins, Prescott went 19-of-32 passes for 246 yards with two passing touchdowns and one interception, and rushed for a touchdown, joining Roger Staubach's record of 20 career rushing touchdowns, in a 31–6 win.

In Week 4 against the New Orleans Saints, Prescott completed 22 passes of 33 attempts for 223 passing yards and one interception in a 12–10 defeat. During Week 5 against the Green Bay Packers, Prescott finished with 463 passing yards, two touchdowns, and three interceptions as the Cowboys lost 34–24. In the following week against the New York Jets, Prescott completed 28 passes of 40 attempts for 277 passing yards and rushed for a touchdown in a 24–22 loss, making the Cowboys having their third consecutive loss. During Week 7 against the Philadelphia Eagles, Prescott went 21-of-27 passes for 239 yards, one touchdown, one interception, and had another 30 rushing yards for one touchdown with 10–37 win.

During Week 9 against the New York Giants on Monday Night Football, Prescott's first pass attempt was intercepted by Antoine Bethea. Afterwards, he threw for 257 yards and three touchdowns in the 37–18 road victory. In Week 10 against the Minnesota Vikings on NBC Sunday Night Football, Prescott threw for 397 yards, three touchdowns, and one interception in the 28–24 loss. During Week 11 against the Detroit Lions, Prescott finished with 444 passing yards, 28 rushing yards, and four total touchdowns in the 35–27 road victory. For his efforts, Prescott was named the NFC Offensive Player of the Week for the second time in 2019.

Against the New England Patriots in Week 12, Prescott struggled during the game as he completed 19-of-33 passes for 212 yards and an interception in a 13–9 defeat. During the Thanksgiving Day game against the Buffalo Bills in Week 13, Prescott passed 32 completions of 49 attempts for 355 passing yards, two passing touchdowns, and one interception in a 26–15 defeat. In the following week against the Chicago Bears in Week 14 on Thursday Night Football, Prescott threw 27 of 49 completions for 334 passing yards and a touchdown in a 31–24 defeat.

During the game against the Los Angeles Rams in Week 15, Prescott threw 9 of 16 completions for 160 yards in the first half. He finished the game with 15 completions of 23 attempts for 212 yards and two touchdown passes, snapping the Cowboys' three-game losing streak in a 44–21 victory. During the NFC East title clinching game in Week 16 against the Philadelphia Eagles, Prescott threw 25 of 44 for 265 yards in a 17–9 defeat. In Week 17 against the Washington Redskins, Prescott threw for 303 yards and four touchdowns and rushed for 35 yards during the 47–16 win.

Prescott finished the season with 4,902 passing yards, which ranked second in the league, 30 touchdowns, which ranked fourth, and 11 interceptions. In addition, he recorded 52 carries for 277 rushing yards and three rushing touchdowns as the Cowboys missed the playoffs with an 8–8 record. He was ranked 46th by his fellow players on the NFL Top 100 Players of 2020.

=== 2020 season ===
The Cowboys placed the franchise tag on Prescott on March 16, 2020, worth $31.4 million for the 2020 season. He signed the tender on June 22, 2020. In Week 1 against the Los Angeles Rams on NBC Sunday Night Football, Prescott threw for 266 yards and a touchdown and rushed for 30 yards as the Cowboys lost 20–17. In Week 2 against the Atlanta Falcons, Prescott threw for 450 passing yards and a touchdown, and rushed for three additional touchdowns to help the Cowboys win 40–39. At one point during the game, the Falcons had a twenty-point lead over the Cowboys, but Prescott's four second half touchdowns aided by a successful onside kick and a last-second field goal won the game for the Cowboys. The win marked the largest comeback at home for the Cowboys since 1984. He became the first player in NFL history to pass for at least 400 yards and rush for three touchdowns in the same game. Prescott was named the NFC Offensive Player of the Week for his performance in Week 2. During Week 3 against the Seattle Seahawks, Prescott finished with 472 passing yards, three touchdowns, and two interceptions as the Cowboys lost 38–31. During Week 4 against the Cleveland Browns, Prescott finished with 502 passing yards, four touchdowns, an interception, and a lost fumble as the Cowboys lost 49–38. He became the first player in NFL history to pass for at least 450 yards in three consecutive games.

In the Week 5 37–34 win against the New York Giants, Prescott suffered an injury to his right ankle, and was carted off the field. He completed 14 passes for 166 yards and an interception plus had a receiving touchdown before leaving. It was revealed that he had suffered a compound fracture and dislocation to his right ankle, and he underwent surgery the same night, ending his season. Prescott was placed on season-ending injured reserve on October 19, 2020.

=== 2021 season ===
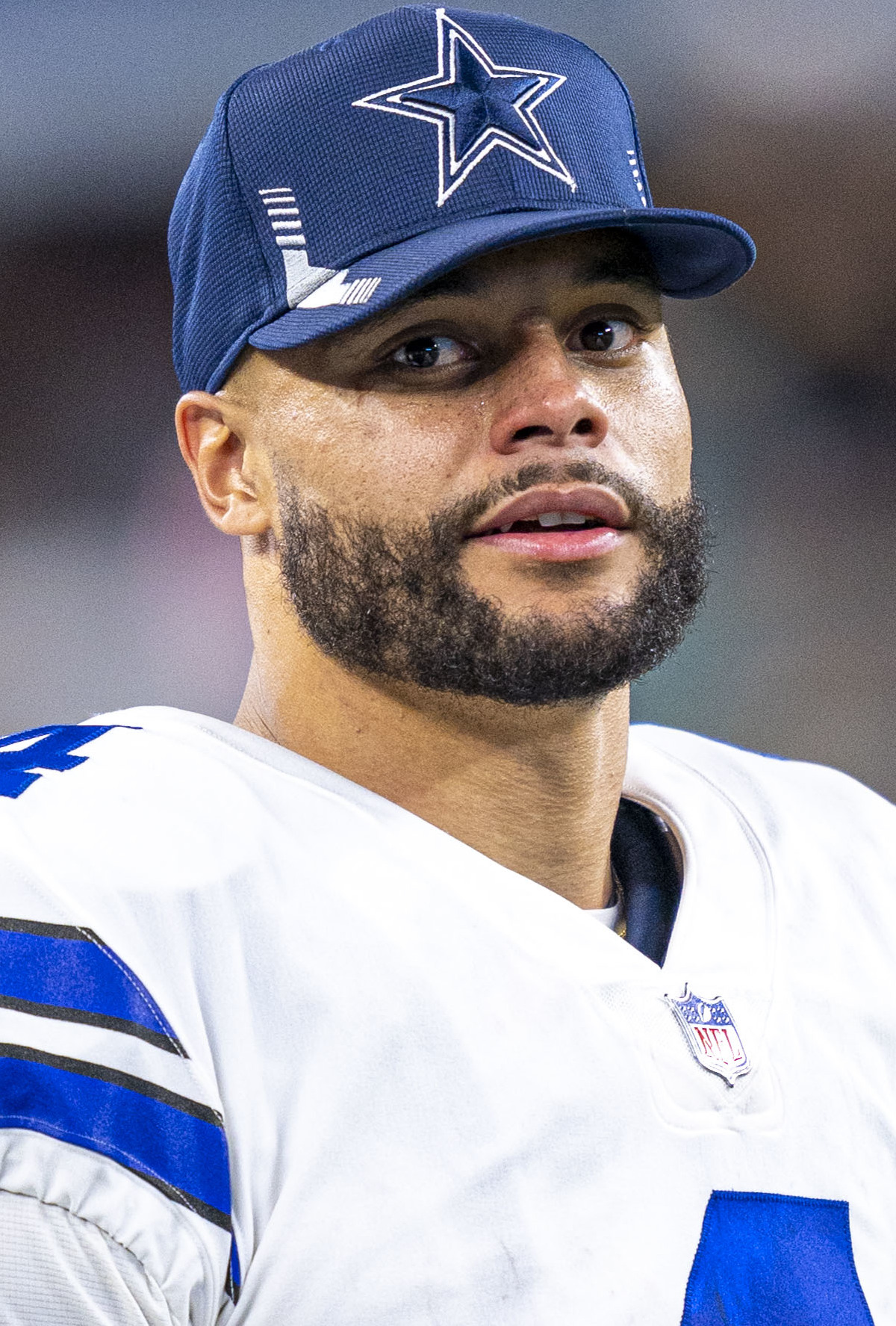
Prescott with the Cowboys in 2021

The Cowboys placed the exclusive franchise tag on Prescott for the second consecutive season on March 9, 2021, and he signed a four-year contract extension with the Cowboys the next day for $160 million with $126 million guaranteed. The deal included a $66 million signing bonus, the highest in NFL history at the time (it was surpassed in 2023 by quarterback Lamar Jackson's contract with the Baltimore Ravens). In June 2021, he left Adidas and signed a five-year deal with Jordan. In his first game back from his injury in Week 1 against the defending Super Bowl champion Tampa Bay Buccaneers in the NFL Kickoff Game, Prescott threw for 403 yards, three touchdowns, and an interception in a 31–29 loss. In Week 6, Prescott threw for 445 yards, three touchdowns, and one interception in a 35–29 overtime win over the New England Patriots. His performance earned him NFC Offensive Player Of The Week. In Week 16, Prescott threw four touchdowns in a 56–14 blowout win against the Washington Football Team as the Cowboys would go on to clinch the NFC East division title. For his performance against Washington, Prescott earned another NFC Offensive Player of the Week. In Week 18, Prescott threw for 295 yards and five touchdowns in a 51–26 win over the Philadelphia Eagles, earning NFC Offensive Player of the Week.

As the division winner, the Cowboys hosted the San Francisco 49ers in the Wild Card Round. In the game, Prescott completed 23 of 43 passing attempts for 254 yards with one touchdown and one interception, and also rushed for 27 yards and an additional touchdown in the 23–17 loss. On the last play with 14 seconds left, Prescott ran a quarterback draw up the middle for 17 yards, and was unable to spike the ball to stop the clock from running down. Despite the loss, Prescott was named NVP (Nickelodeon Valuable Player) with more than 81 percent of the online vote, becoming the second losing quarterback to do so in as many years. Prescott later apologized for comments which appeared to condone fans throwing objects at the officiating crew after the game ended. He was ranked 44th by his fellow players on the NFL Top 100 Players of 2022.

=== 2022 season ===
In Week 1 against the Tampa Bay Buccaneers, Prescott struggled, completing 14 of 29 passes for 134 yards and an interception before leaving the game in the fourth quarter with a right thumb injury in the 19–3 loss. Later, it was announced Prescott would miss 6–8 weeks with the thumb injury. Prescott returned in Week 7 against the Detroit Lions, where he threw 207 yards and a touchdown in the 24–6 win. Prescott finished the season with 2,860 passing yards, 66.2% passing completion, 23 touchdowns, and a season-high of 15 interceptions in 12 games.

In the Wild Card Round, Prescott completed 25 of 33 passes for 305 yards, four passing touchdowns, and rushed for a touchdown as the Cowboys defeated the Tampa Bay Buccaneers 31–14.

In the Divisional Round, Prescott threw for 206 yards and one touchdown but threw two interceptions as the Cowboys would lose 19–12 against the San Francisco 49ers. He won the 2022 NFL Walter Payton Man of the Year. Prescott was ranked 56th by his fellow players on the NFL Top 100 Players of 2023.

=== 2023 season ===
In the season opener against the division rival New York Giants, Prescott completed 13 of 24 passes for 143 yards, shutting them out 40–0 in a blowout victory. It was his 11th consecutive time beating the New York Giants. In Week 2 against the New York Jets, Prescott completed 31 passes out of 38 attempts for 255 passing yards and 2 passing touchdowns in a 30–10 win. In the following week against the Arizona Cardinals, Prescott went 25-of-40 passes for 249 yards, a touchdown, and an interception in a 28–16 defeat. In Week 4 against the New England Patriots, Prescott completed 28 passes out of 34 attempts for 261 passing yards and a first-quarter touchdown to CeeDee Lamb in a 38–3 win. Facing the eventual NFC champion San Francisco 49ers the following week, Prescott was sacked three times and completed 14-of-24 passes for 153 passing yards, a touchdown pass, and three interceptions in a 42–10 lopsided defeat. In Week 6 against the Los Angeles Chargers, Prescott completed 21 of 30 passes for 272 yards, a touchdown pass, 40 rushing yards and a touchdown as the Cowboys rallied for a 20–17 victory. Prescott also became the 30th quarterback to throw at least one touchdown pass against 31-or-more opponents in NFL history.

After the bye week, Prescott threw 25-of-31 completions for 304 yards, four passing touchdowns, and an interception as the Cowboys defeated the Los Angeles Rams 43–20 in their 11th consecutive home victory. In Week 9 against the Philadelphia Eagles, Prescott threw for 374 passing yards and three touchdown passes in a 28–23 defeat. In Week 10, Prescott completed 26 of 35 passes for 404 passing yards, four touchdown passes, an interception, and had a 10-yard rushing touchdown, defeating the New York Giants 49–17 for his 12th consecutive victory against them. He also set a franchise record with his third game of at least 400 passing yards and four touchdown passes, and was named FedEx Air Player of Week 10. In Week 12 on Thanksgiving Day, Prescott threw for 331 yards and 4 passing touchdowns in his fifth consecutive game with at least two touchdown passes, defeating the Washington Commanders 45–10. Prescott also tied Tony Romo's team record of 10 games with at least four touchdown passes. Prescott was named the NFC Offensive Player of the month for November after passing for 1,298 yards, 13 touchdowns, one interception, and completing 68.5% of his passes.

In Week 13 against the Seattle Seahawks, Prescott threw for 299 yards and 3 passing touchdowns in a 41–35 victory. In Week 15 against the Buffalo Bills, Prescott struggled throughout the game, taking three sacks and completing 21 of 34 passes for 134 yards and an interception in a 31–10 loss. In the following week against the Miami Dolphins, Prescott completed 20-of-32 passes for 253 yards and two touchdowns, and lost a fumble in the 22–20 loss. In Week 17 against the Detroit Lions, Prescott threw 26 of 38 completions for 345 yards and two touchdowns, including a 92-yard touchdown to CeeDee Lamb, and an interception in a narrow 20–19 win. The 92-yard touchdown pass was the second-longest pass in franchise history, behind a 95-yard connection between Don Meredith and Bob Hayes in 1966.

In the regular season finale against the Washington Commanders, Prescott completed 31 passes out of 36 attempts for 279 yards, four touchdowns, and an interception, leading the Cowboys to a 38–10 blowout victory and clinching the NFC East. Prescott finished his 2023 regular season with a 69.5% completion percentage, 4,516 passing yards, and NFL leading 36 passing touchdowns, nine interceptions, and a career-high passer rating of 105.9. Prescott was named a finalist for NFL MVP and finished second in voting, behind Lamar Jackson. At home against the No. 7 seeded Green Bay Packers in the Wild Card Round, Prescott threw two interceptions in the first half, with one of them returned for a touchdown as the Cowboys fell into a 27–0 hole that they could not recover from, as they lost 48–32.

=== 2024 season ===
On September 8, 2024, Prescott and the Cowboys agreed to terms on a four-year contract extension worth $240 million, including $231 million guaranteed and an $80 million signing bonus. With an average of $60 million a year, the deal gives Prescott the highest average annual value in NFL history.

In the Cowboys’ season opener against the Cleveland Browns, he completed 19 of 32 passes for 179 yards and one touchdown in a 33–17 win. In Week 3 against the Baltimore Ravens, he threw for 379 yards and two touchdowns in a 28–25 loss. Four days later, in a Week 4 matchup with the New York Giants on Thursday Night Football, Prescott completed 22 of 27 passes for 221 yards and two touchdowns in a 20–15 win. In Week 5 against the Pittsburgh Steelers on Sunday Night Football, despite throwing two interceptions and losing a fumble, he threw for 352 yards and two touchdowns, including a four-yard game-winning touchdown pass to Jalen Tolbert with 20 seconds remaining in a 20–17 victory. In the Cowboys’ Week 6 matchup against the Detroit Lions, Prescott struggled, throwing for just 178 yards and two interceptions in a 47–9 loss.

In Week 9, Prescott injured his hamstring during a 27–21 loss to the Falcons. An initial diagnosis revealed that Prescott suffered a partial avulsion of his right hamstring, keeping him sidelined for multiple weeks. On November 12, Cowboys owner Jerry Jones announced Prescott would undergo hamstring surgery and miss the rest of the season. Prescott finished his ninth season with 1,978 passing yards, 11 touchdowns, and eight interceptions, leading the Cowboys to a 3–5 record. His 86.0 passer rating and 1.38-to-1 touchdown-to-interception ratio were career lows, while his 64.7% completion rate was the second-lowest of his career.

=== 2025 season ===
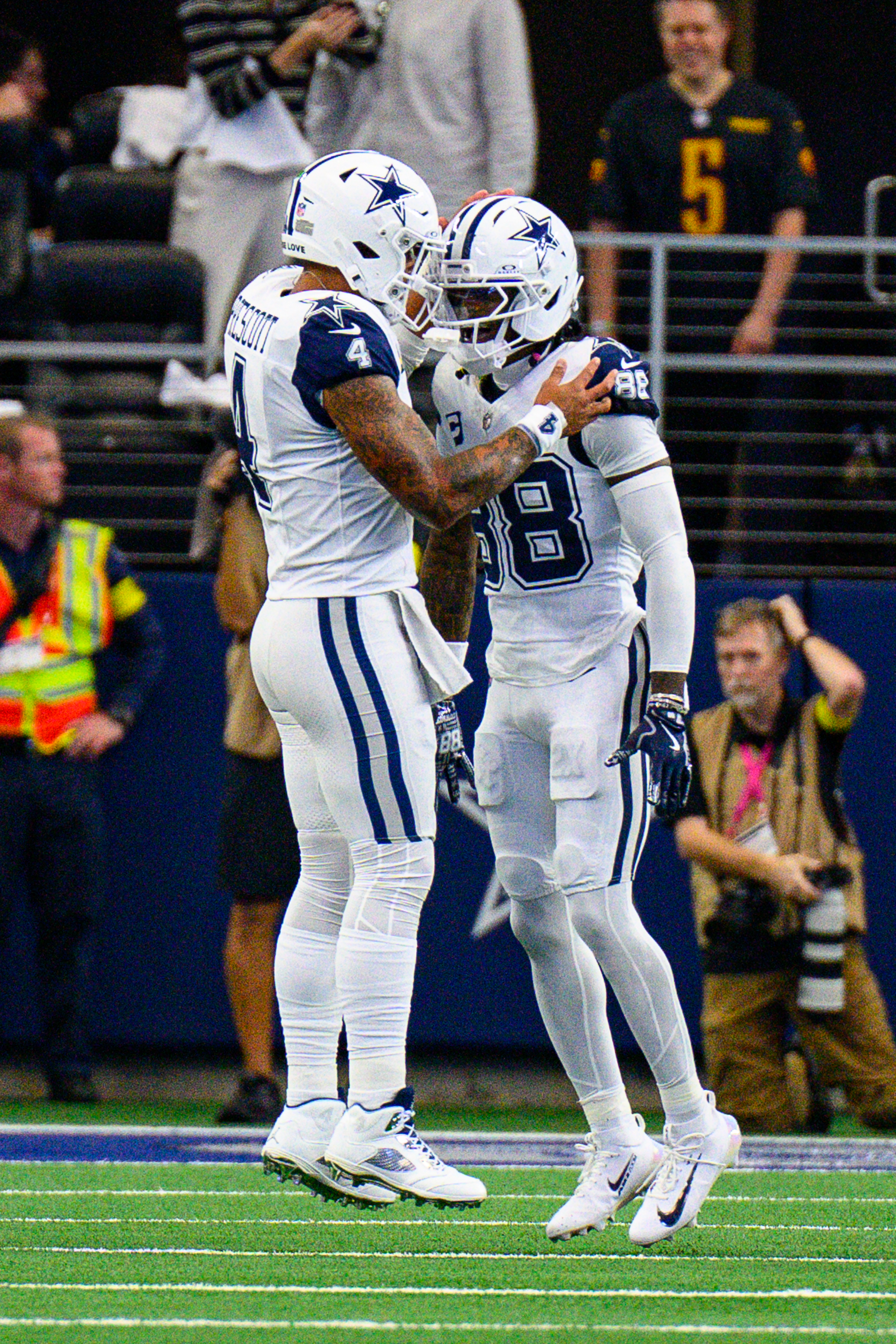
Prescott with CeeDee Lamb in 2025

Following the retirement of Zack Martin and the departure of DeMarcus Lawrence via free agency, Prescott became the longest active member of the Cowboys. Prescott became the longest-tenured quarterback with the team that originally drafted him going into the 2025 season.

In the NFL Kickoff game of the 2025 NFL season against the Philadelphia Eagles, Eagles defensive tackle Jalen Carter spat on Prescott, resulting in an unsportsmanlike penalty and Carter's disqualification only six seconds into the game. Prescott was claimed to have spit first, but he later denied that he was spitting and if he did, it was accidental. During the game, Prescott completed 21 of 34 passes for 188 yards in a 24–20 loss.

In Week 2 against the New York Giants, Prescott completed 38 of 52 passes for 361 yards, throwing two touchdowns and one interception in a 40–37 overtime victory. In Week 4 against the Green Bay Packers on Sunday Night Football, Prescott completed 31 of 40 passes for 319 yards and three touchdowns, and also scored on a two-yard rushing touchdown in a 40–40 tie. In Week 5 against the New York Jets, Prescott completed 18 of 29 passes for 237 yards and four touchdowns in a 37–22 victory.

In Week 6 against the Carolina Panthers, Prescott completed 25 of 34 passes for 261 yards and three touchdowns in a 30–27 loss. In Week 7 against the Washington Commanders, Prescott completed 21 of 30 passes for 264 yards and three touchdowns in a 44–22 win. In Week 9 against the Arizona Cardinals on Monday Night Football, Prescott completed 24 of 39 passes for 250 yards, throwing one touchdown and one interception in a 27–17 loss.

In Week 11 against the Las Vegas Raiders on Monday Night Football, Prescott completed 25 of 44 passes for 268 yards and four touchdowns in a 33–16 victory. For his efforts, he set the Cowboys franchise record for most games with 3+ passing touchdowns with 41, surpassing Tony Romo's previous record of 40.

In Week 12 against the Eagles, Prescott completed 23 of 36 passes for 354 yards, throwing two touchdowns and one interception, and also scored on an eight-yard rushing touchdown in a 24–21 victory. He led the team past a 21–0 deficit in the second quarter, tying the record for the largest comeback victory in Cowboys history. Prescott also broke Tony Romo's all-time franchise passing yards record of 34,184 yards.

In Week 13 against the Kansas City Chiefs on Thanksgiving Day, Prescott completed 27 of 39 passes for 320 yards, throwing two touchdowns and one interception in a 31–28 victory. In Week 16 against the Los Angeles Chargers, Prescott completed 21 of 30 passes for 244 yards and two touchdowns in a 34–17 loss. In Week 17 against the Commanders on Christmas Day, Prescott completed 19 of 37 passes for 307 yards and two touchdowns in a 30–23 win.

Prescott finished the season with a 67.3% completion percentage, 4,552 passing yards and 30 touchdowns against 10 interceptions. He also led the league in passing completions for the second time in his career. He was also named to his fourth career Pro Bowl.

=== 2026 season ===
In Week 2 against the Washington Commanders, Prescott completed 26 of 31 passes for 279 yards and threw four touchdowns to break Tony Romo's franchise record of 248 career touchdowns in a 37-20 win. In Week 3 against the Baltimore Ravens, Prescott completed 25 of 40 passes for 276 yards and one touchdown in a 34-31 loss. In Week 4 against the Houston Texans, Prescott completed 32 of 45 passes for 335 yards, and threw a game-winning 12-yard touchdown pass to CeeDee Lamb with 40 seconds remaining in a 34-30 victory.

In Week 7 against the Philadelphia Eagles on Monday Night Football, Prescott completed 15 of 27 passes for 212 yards and three touchdowns in a 38-21 victory. In Week 9 against the Indianapolis Colts, Prescott completed 21 of 34 passes for 335 yards and touchdowns in a 27-23 victory. In Week 10 against the San Francisco 49ers, Prescott completed 30 of 51 passes for 343 yards, throwing five touchdowns and one interception in a 46-40 loss.

== Career statistics ==
Legend
	Led the league
**Bold**	Career high

=== NFL ===
==== Regular season ====
Year	Team	Games			Passing										Rushing					Sacks		Fumbles	
Year	Team	GP	GS	Record	Cmp	Att	Pct	Yds	Y/A	Y/G	Lng	TD	Int	Rtg	Att	Yds	Y/A	Lng	TD	Sck	SckY	Fum	Lost
2016	DAL	16	16	**13–3**	311	459	67.8	3,667	8.0	229.2	83	23	4	104.9	57	282	4.9	18	**6**	25	143	9	4
2017	DAL	16	16	9–7	308	490	62.9	3,324	6.8	207.8	81	22	13	86.6	57	**357**	**6.3**	21	**6**	32	185	4	3
2018	DAL	16	16	10–6	356	526	67.7	3,885	7.4	242.8	90	22	8	96.9	**75**	305	4.1	28	**6**	**56**	**347**	12	**6**
2019	DAL	16	16	8–8	388	596	65.1	**4,902**	8.2	306.4	62	30	11	99.7	52	277	5.3	**42**	3	23	151	6	2
2020	DAL	5	5	2–3	151	222	68.0	1,856	**8.4**	**371.2**	58	9	4	99.6	18	93	5.2	12	3	10	66	3	3
2021	DAL	16	16	11–5	**410**	596	68.8	4,449	7.5	278.1	51	**37**	10	104.2	48	146	3.0	21	1	30	144	**14**	**6**
2022	DAL	12	12	8–4	261	394	66.2	2,860	7.3	238.3	68	23	**15**	91.1	45	182	4.0	25	1	20	126	4	1
2023	DAL	17	17	12–5	**410**	590	**69.5**	4,516	7.7	265.6	**92**	36	9	**105.9**	55	242	4.4	22	2	39	255	4	2
2024	DAL	8	8	3–5	185	286	64.7	1,978	6.9	247.3	65	11	8	86.0	13	54	4.2	22	1	21	112	4	1
2025	DAL	17	17	7–9–1	404	**600**	67.3	4,552	7.6	267.8	86	30	10	99.5	53	177	3.3	14	2	31	208	6	2
2026	DAL	10	10	4–6	248	387	64.1	2,724	7.0	272.4	53	21	6	96.4	29	109	3.8	11	1	15	69	1	0
Career		149	149	87–61–1	3,432	5,146	66.7	38,713	7.5	259.8	92	264	98	98.2	502	2,224	4.4	42	32	302	1,806	67	30

==== Postseason ====
Year	Team	Games			Passing									Rushing					Sacks		Fumbles	
Year	Team	GP	GS	Record	Cmp	Att	Pct	Yds	Y/A	Lng	TD	Int	Rtg	Att	Yds	Y/A	Lng	TD	Sck	SckY	Fum	Lost
2016	DAL	1	1	0–1	24	38	63.2	302	**7.9**	40	3	1	**103.2**	2	13	6.5	9	0	2	11	0	0
2018	DAL	2	2	**1–1**	42	65	64.6	492	7.6	44	2	1	91.3	8	32	4.0	16	**2**	2	18	0	0
2021	DAL	1	1	0–1	23	43	53.5	254	5.9	38	1	1	69.3	4	27	6.8	17	1	**5**	**40**	**1**	0
2022	DAL	2	2	**1–1**	**48**	**70**	**68.6**	**511**	7.3	46	**5**	**2**	101.5	**11**	**46**	4.2	11	1	2	8	0	0
2023	DAL	1	1	0–1	41	60	68.3	403	6.7	**47**	3	**2**	89.8	6	45	**7.5**	**18**	0	4	16	0	0
Career		7	7	2–5	178	276	64.5	1,962	7.1	47	14	7	91.8	31	163	5.3	18	4	15	93	1	0

=== College ===
Season	Team	Games			Passing								Rushing				Receiving			
Season	Team	GP	GS	Record	Cmp	Att	Pct	Yds	Y/A	TD	Int	Rtg	Att	Yds	Avg	TD	Rec	Yds	Avg	TD
2011	Mississippi State	0	0	—	Redshirt															
2012	Mississippi State	12	0	—	18	29	62.1	194	6.7	4	0	**163.8**	32	118	3.7	4	0	0	0.0	0
2013	Mississippi State	11	7	4–3	156	267	58.4	1,940	7.3	10	7	126.6	134	829	**6.2**	13	**2**	**53**	**26.5**	**2**
2014	Mississippi State	13	13	**10–3**	244	396	61.6	3,449	**8.7**	27	**11**	151.7	**210**	**986**	4.7	**14**	**2**	35	17.5	1
2015	Mississippi State	13	13	9–4	**316**	**477**	**66.2**	**3,793**	8.0	**29**	5	151.0	160	588	3.7	10	0	0	0.0	0
Career		49	33	23–10	734	1,169	62.8	9,376	8.0	70	23	146.0	536	2,521	4.0	41	4	88	22.0	3

== Career highlights ==
=== Awards and honors ===
NFL

- NFL Rookie of the Year (2016)
- Walter Payton Man of the Year (2022)
- Offensive Rookie of the Month – November 2016
- Pepsi NFL Rookie of the Year winner (2016)
- 5× Pepsi NFL Rookie of the Week
- 4× Pro Bowl (2016, 2018, 2023, 2025)
- 2× FedEx Air Player of the Week (2018)
- 4× NFC Offensive Player of the Week (Week 1, 2019, Week 11, 2019, Week 2, 2020, Week 6, 2021)
- PFWA Good Guy Award (2026)
- Ranked No. 14 in the Top 100 Players of 2017
- Ranked No. 46 in the Top 100 Players of 2020
- Ranked No. 44 in the Top 100 Players of 2022
- Ranked No. 56 in the Top 100 Players of 2023
- Ranked No. 16 in the Top 100 Players of 2024
- Ranked No. 79 in the Top 100 Players of 2025
- Ranked No. 31 in the Top 100 Players of 2026

College

- 2016 Senior Bowl Most Outstanding Player
- 2015 Senior Class Award
- 2014 and 2015 Conerly Trophy
- 2015 Belk Bowl MVP
- 2013, 2014, and 2015 SEC Fall Academic Honor Roll
- 2015 SEC Offensive Player of the Week (at Arkansas and vs. Kentucky)
- 2014 and 2015 First-team All-SEC (AP and Coaches)
- 2014 SEC Offensive Player of Week (at LSU, vs. Auburn, and vs. Vanderbilt)
- 2013 Liberty Bowl MVP

=== Records ===
==== NFL records ====
Prescott finished his 2016 rookie regular season with a record 11 games with an over 100 NFL passer rating, breaking the rookie record of nine games set by Russell Wilson in 2012. He tied the Ben Roethlisberger 2004 rookie record of winning 13 games as a starter. His NFL passer rating of 104.9 broke Robert Griffin III's rookie record of 102.4 set in 2012. His 0.87% interception to attempts (459–4) broke the rookie record of 1.27% (393–5) set by Robert Griffin III. He threw 23 touchdowns and 4 interceptions for a touchdown to interception ratio of 5.75 breaking the previous rookie record of 4.00 (20 touchdowns and 5 interceptions) set by Robert Griffin III, and for a touchdown to interception differential of 19 breaking Russell Wilson's rookie record of 16 (26 touchdowns and 10 interceptions). His 67.76% pass completion percentage broke the rookie record of 66.44% set by Ben Roethlisberger. In a game against the Tampa Bay Buccaneers, Prescott set an NFL rookie record with an 88.9% completion percentage. The record was later broken by Jayden Daniels in 2024.

In 2023, he led the NFL in passing touchdowns, with 36, and passing completions, with 410.

==== Cowboys franchise records ====
- Most Completions (game): 42 (December 9, 2018, against the Philadelphia Eagles)
- Most Completions (rookie season): 311 (2016)
- Most Completions (game, as a rookie): 32 (December 18, 2016, against the Tampa Bay Buccaneers)
- Most Pass Attempts (rookie season): 459 (2016)
- Most Passing Yards (career): 34,378 (2025)
- Most Passing Yards (rookie season): 3,667 (2016)
- Most Passing Touchdowns (career): 249 (2026)
- Most Passing Touchdowns (season): 37 (2021)
- Most Passing Touchdowns (rookie season): 23 (2016)
- Best Passer Rating (rookie season): 104.9 (2016)
- Best Passer Rating (game, as a rookie): 148.3 (December 16, 2016, against the Detroit Lions)
- Most Yds/Pass Att (rookie season): 7.99 (2016)
- Most Pass Yds/Game (career): 257.1
- Most Pass Yds/Game (season): 306.4 (2019)
- Most Pass Yds/Game (rookie season): 229.2 (2016)
- Most 300+ yard passing games (rookie season): 3
- Completion Percentage (career): 66.6%
- Interception Percentage: (career: minimum 16 starts): 2.0%
- Interception Percentage: (season/rookie season): 0.9% (2016)
- Most sacks taken: (season) 56 (2018)
- Most 4th Quarter Comebacks (rookie season): 5 (2016)
- Most 4th Quarter Comebacks (season): 5 (2016, tied with Tony Romo in 2012)
- Most Games with 3+ Passing Touchdowns (career): 41 (2025)

==== College records ====
- Prescott holds 38 Mississippi State school records
- Single game record for passing yards in the Orange Bowl (453)
- Single game record for passing attempts in the Orange Bowl (51, tied)
- Single game record for passing completions in the Orange Bowl (33, tied)
- Single game record for passing yards in the Belk Bowl (380)
- Single game record for total yards in the Belk Bowl (427)
- Single game record for touchdown passes in the Belk Bowl with (4, tied with Brendon Kay and John Wolford)

== Personal life ==
Prescott is a Christian. He is the son of Nathaniel and Peggy Prescott and has two older brothers, Tad and Jace, an older sister, Natalie Prescott-Smith, and an older half-brother, Elliott Prescott, from his father's previous marriage. Jace was an offensive lineman at Northwestern State. His mother died of colon cancer in November 2013. The Faith Fight Finish Foundation by Dak Prescott has been established in her honor, which helps people deal with adversity. His older brother Jace died by suicide in April 2020. His father is African American and his mother was White. Prescott currently resides in Frisco, Texas.

Prescott graduated from Mississippi State with a bachelor's degree in educational psychology in December 2014, and a master’s degree in workforce leadership in December 2015, both of which he completed before entering the 2016 NFL Draft.

On November 26, 2023, Prescott's then-girlfriend, Sarah Jane Ramos, announced via Instagram that the couple were expecting the birth of a baby girl. On March 4, Prescott announced that the baby was born on February 29, 2024. On October 18th, 2024 the two announced their engagement via Instagram; seven months later, Prescott and Ramos welcomed a second daughter on May 22, 2025. Prescott and Ramos ended their engagement in March 2026, one month before the wedding was scheduled to take place.

== See also ==
- Mississippi State Bulldogs football statistical leaders
- List of National Football League records (individual)
