= 2006 Southland Conference men's basketball tournament =

American basketball tournament

- Classification: Division I
- Season: 2005–06
- Teams: 8
- First round site: Campus sites Campus locations
- Finals site: Prather Coliseum; Natchitoches, Louisiana
- Champions: Northwestern State (2nd title)
- Winning coach: Mike McConathy (2nd title)
- MVP: Clifton Lee (Northwestern State)

2005–06 Southland Conference men's basketball standings
	Conf.				Overall
Team	W		L	PCT	W		L	PCT
Northwestern State †	15	–	1	.938	26	–	8	.765
Sam Houston State	11	–	5	.688	22	–	9	.710
Southeastern Louisiana	10	–	6	.625	16	–	12	.571
Stephen F. Austin	9	–	7	.563	17	–	12	.586
Lamar	9	–	7	.563	17	–	14	.548
McNeese State	9	–	7	.563	14	–	14	.500
Texas–Arlington	7	–	9	.438	14	–	16	.467
UTSA	6	–	10	.375	11	–	17	.393
Louisiana–Monroe	6	–	10	.375	10	–	18	.357
Nicholls State	5	–	11	.313	9	–	18	.333
Texas State	1	–	15	.063	3	–	24	.111
† 2006 Southland tournament winner As of March 6, 2006

The 2006 Southland Conference men's basketball tournament took place March 7–12, 2006. The quarterfinal and semifinal rounds were played at the home arena of the higher seeded-teams, with the championship game played at Prather Coliseum in Natchitoches, Louisiana. Number 1 seed Northwestern State won the championship game over number 2 seed Sam Houston State, 95–97.

The Demons earned the conference's automatic bid to the NCAA tournament where they won the first NCAA Tournament game in the round of 64 by knocking off Iowa, 64–63 in the opening round. The Demons lost in the second round to No. 6 seed West Virginia.

== Format ==
The top eight eligible men's basketball teams in the Southland Conference receive a berth in the conference tournament. After the conference season, teams were seeded by conference record.

== Bracket ==
Quarterfinals; March 7
1	Northwestern State	75
8	UTSA	61
4	Stephen F. Austin	72
5	McNeese State	70
(Pairings are reseeded after the first round)
3	Southeastern Louisiana	65
6	Lamar	68
2	Sam Houston State	86
7	Texas–Arlington	84

Semifinals; March 9
1	Northwestern State	80
6	Lamar	66
2	Sam Houston State	78
4	Stephen F. Austin	72

Finals; March 12
1	Northwestern State	95
2	Sam Houston State	87
