= Dodie Horton =

American politician (born 1956)

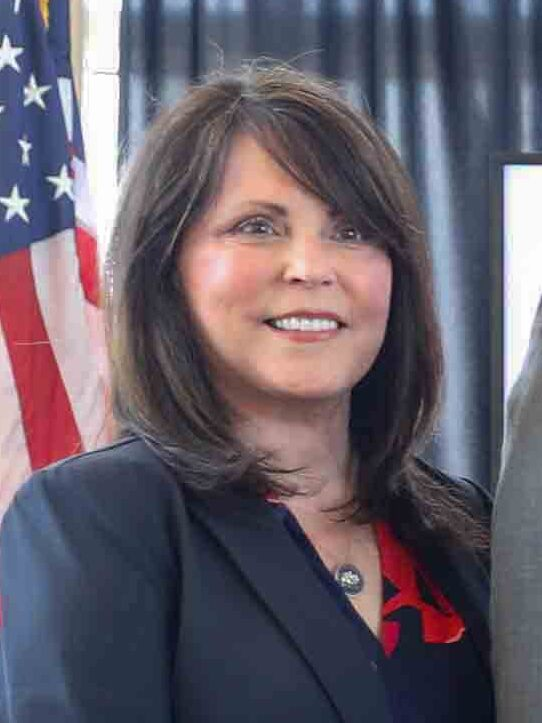
- Horton in 2025

Member of the Louisiana House of Representatives from the 9th district
- Incumbent
- Assumed office January 2016
- Preceded by: Henry Burns

Personal details
- Born: December 6, 1956 (age 69)
- Party: Republican
- Spouse: Gary Horton (m. 1976)
- Children: 3
- Occupation: Legislative assistant prior to her election to the state House of Representatives

Sylvia Delores Miller Horton, known as Dodie Horton (born December 6, 1956), is a Republican from Haughton, Louisiana, who is the state representative for District 9 in Bossier Parish in the northwestern corner of her state.

In January 2016, Horton succeeded Henry Burns of Bossier City, who left the House seat to seek the District 36 position in the Louisiana State Senate. Horton had been Burns' legislative assistant since he entered the House in 2008.

In the primary election held on October 24, 2015, Horton handily defeated a single opponent, fellow Republican Mike McHalffey (born March 1959) of Benton, 4,584 votes (63.8 percent) to 2,602 (36.2 percent), for the right to succeed Burns.

== Career ==
On June 8, 2017, Democratic state Senator Karen Carter Peterson of New Orleans shouted an obscenity at Representative Horton after Horton asked a group of senators present on the House floor to stop talking so that the budget proceedings being considered could be heard. Peterson later apologized for her verbal attack.

The House voted in May 2019 to roll back a sales tax hike of 0.45 percent that was scheduled to expire in 2025, but Horton said that she was pessimistic about the tax being reduced because so many Republicans in the state Senate are not conservatives. "Not all Republicans are equal," she said.

In March 2022, Horton authored House Bill 837 that would punish schools, teachers and administrators for discussing any topics in classrooms that related to LGBTQ American individuals, their lives and their families. Horton stated that "my bill is an attempt to protect our most innocent from indoctrination of any kind." Horton went on to claim that sexual orientation is a choice.

In 2023, Horton authored HB8 which requires public schools to display the national motto of "In God We Trust" inside of all classrooms. The bill was signed by Governor John Bel Edwards in June 2023.

In 2024, Horton voted in favor of advancing House Bill 545 from the Administration of Criminal Justice committee. The bill, filed by Republican Beryl Amedee, would remove legal protections for obscenity from teachers and librarians in all Louisiana public schools.

In 2024, Horton pushed for House Bill 71, requiring the Ten Commandments to be displayed in all Louisiana public schools. The bill was signed into law June 18, 2024, by Governor Jeff Landry. Within hours after its signing the law was challenged by four civil liberties groups.

== Personal life ==
Horton and her husband, Gary Lynn Horton (born November 1953), married in 1976. They have three daughters. She is Southern Baptist.

Horton has a high school education.

Louisiana House of Representatives
Preceded by Henry Burns	Louisiana State Representative for District 9 (Bossier Parish); 2016 –	Succeeded by Incumbent
