= Haughton High School =

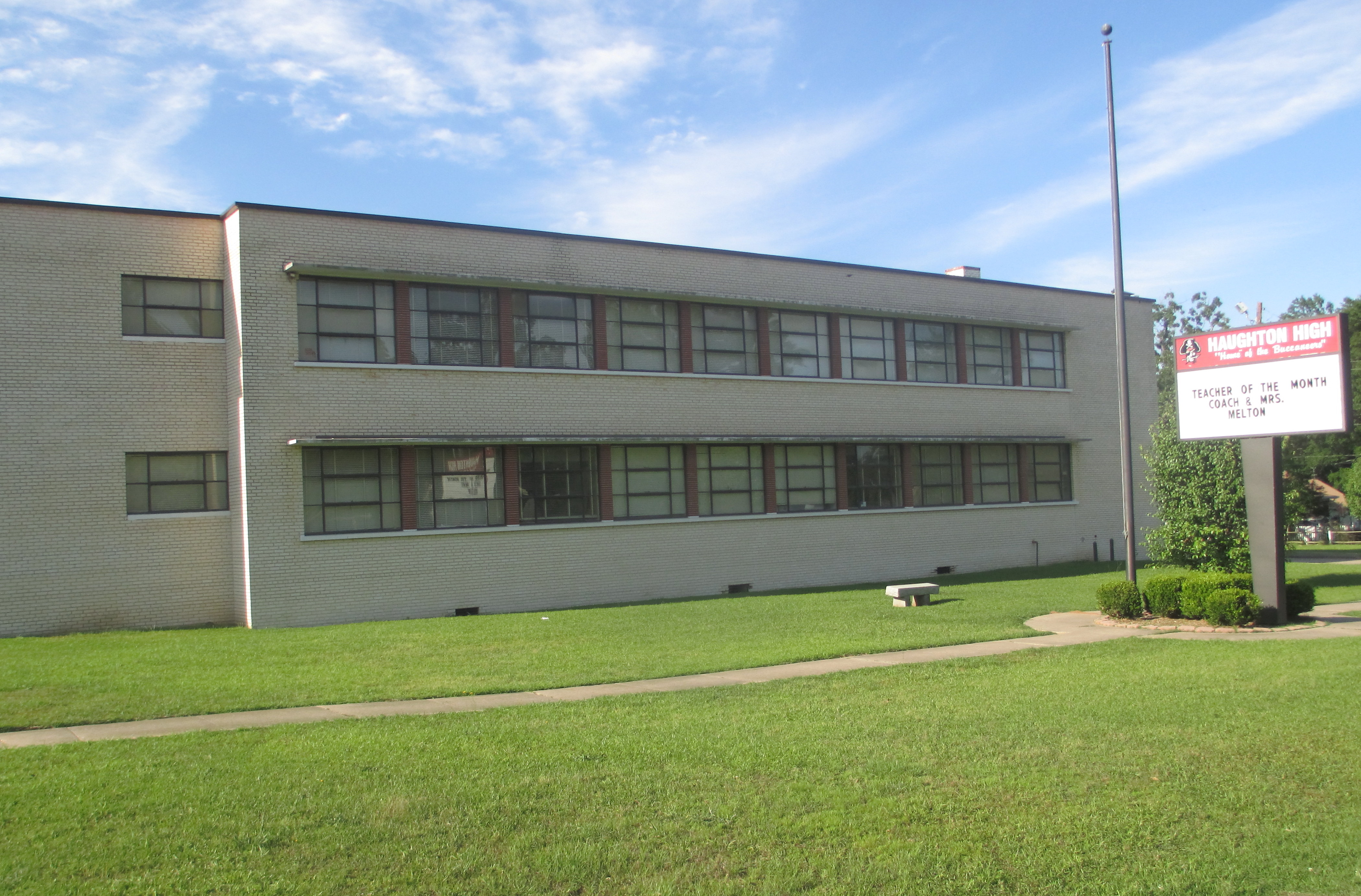

Location
- 210 E McKinley Ave; Haughton, Bossier Parish, Louisiana 71037; United States; 32.5341°N 93.5006°W

Information
- Type: Public
- School district: Bossier Public Schools
- Principal: David Haynie
- Teaching staff: 74.17 (on an FTE basis)
- Grades: 9–12
- Enrollment: 1,412 (2023–2024)
- Student to teacher ratio: 19.04
- Colors: Red & White
- Mascot: Buccaneer
- Nickname: Bucs
- Communities served: Town of Haughton
- Feeder schools: Haughton Middle School
- Website: haughtonh.bossierschools.org/o/hhs

Haughton High School is a public high school in Haughton, Louisiana, United States that enrolls 1,159 students from grades 9–12. The school received an "A" rating by the Louisiana Department of Education. It is administered by Bossier Parish Schools. 80% of students received a four-year diploma, compared to 79% in the district and 74% statewide. The Haughton Buccaneers play in district District 1-5A.

The school's attendance boundary includes Haughton, a small portion of Bossier City, Eastwood, most of Red Chute, Fillmore, Princeton, and the East Reservation Area of Barksdale Air Force Base.

== Athletics ==
Haughton High athletics competes in the LHSAA.

=== Championships ===
Football Championships

- (1) State Championship: 1977

== Notable alumni ==
- Myron Baker, linebacker for the Bears and Panthers.
- Joe Delaney (class of 1977) former NFL running back.
- Crystal Smith (class of 2002), WNBA player.
- Dak Prescott (class of 2011), quarterback for the Mississippi State Bulldogs football team. Quarterback for the Dallas Cowboys in the NFL.

== Notable faculty ==
- Billy Wayne Montgomery, tennis coach, basketball coach, principal and a former member of the Louisiana House of Representatives.
