= 2001 Southland Conference men's basketball tournament =

American basketball tournament

- Classification: Division I
- Season: 2000–01
- Teams: 8
- First round site: Campus sites
- Semifinals site: CenturyTel Center; Bossier City, Louisiana
- Finals site: CenturyTel Center; Bossier City, Louisiana
- Champions: Northwestern State (1st title)
- Winning coach: Mike McConathy (1st title)
- MVP: Michael Byars-Dawson (Northwestern State)

2000–01 Southland Conference men's basketball standings
	Conf.				Overall
Team	W		L	PCT	W		L	PCT
McNeese State	17	–	3	.850	22	–	9	.710
Nicholls State	12	–	8	.600	14	–	14	.500
UTSA	12	–	8	.600	14	–	15	.483
Northwestern State †	11	–	9	.550	19	–	13	.594
Sam Houston State	11	–	9	.550	16	–	13	.552
Texas–Arlington	11	–	9	.550	13	–	15	.464
Southwest Texas State	10	–	10	.500	13	–	15	.464
Louisiana–Monroe	8	–	12	.400	11	–	17	.393
Lamar	7	–	13	.350	9	–	18	.333
Stephen F. Austin	6	–	14	.300	9	–	17	.346
Southeastern Louisiana	5	–	15	.250	8	–	21	.276
† 2001 Southland Conference tournament winner Rankings from AP Poll

The 2001 Southland Conference men's basketball tournament took place March 6–10, 2001. The quarterfinal rounds were played at the home arena of the higher seeded-teams, with the semifinals and championship game played at CenturyTel Center in Bossier City, Louisiana.

Sixth-seeded Northwestern State won the championship game over top-seeded McNeese State, and earned the conference's automatic bid to the NCAA tournament. Conference tournament runner-up McNeese State was invited to the 2001 NIT Tournament. Michael Byars-Dawson of Northwestern State was named the tournament's MVP.

== Format ==
The top eight eligible men's basketball teams in the Southland Conference received a berth in the conference tournament. After the conference season, teams were seeded by conference record.

== Bracket ==
Quarterfinals; March 6
1	McNeese State	83
8	Louisiana–Monroe	78
4	Sam Houston State	103
5	Texas–Arlington	98^{2OT}
3	Nicholls State	61
6	Northwestern State	68
2	UTSA	71
7	Southwest Texas State	69

Semifinals; March 9
1	McNeese State	99
4	Sam Houston State	82
6	Northwestern State	86
2	UTSA	71

Finals; March 10
1	McNeese State	71
6	Northwestern State	72
