= Henry Lee Burns =

American politician in Louisiana (born 1947)

Louisiana State Representative for District 9 (Bossier Parish)
- In office January 14, 2008 – January 11, 2016
- Preceded by: Billy Montgomery
- Succeeded by: Dodie Horton

Personal details
- Born: March 2, 1947 (age 79) Shongaloo, Louisiana, U.S.
- Party: Democrat- turned-Republican (2006)
- Spouse: Lynette Morrand Burns
- Children: Including: Christopher Ryan Burns
- Parent(s): A. J., Sr., and Mildred O'Bier Burns
- Education: Shongaloo High School Northwestern State University Pepperdine University
- Occupation: Bakery owner; Horse breeder

Military service
- Branch/service: United States Army
- Rank: Lieutenant colonel

Henry Lee Burns (born March 2, 1947) is former Louisiana politician who served in the Louisiana House of Representatives.

Louisiana House of Representatives
Preceded by Billy Montgomery	Louisiana State Representative for District 9 (Bossier Parish); Henry Lee Burns; 2008–2016	Succeeded by Dodie Horton
