= Haughton, Louisiana =

- Town
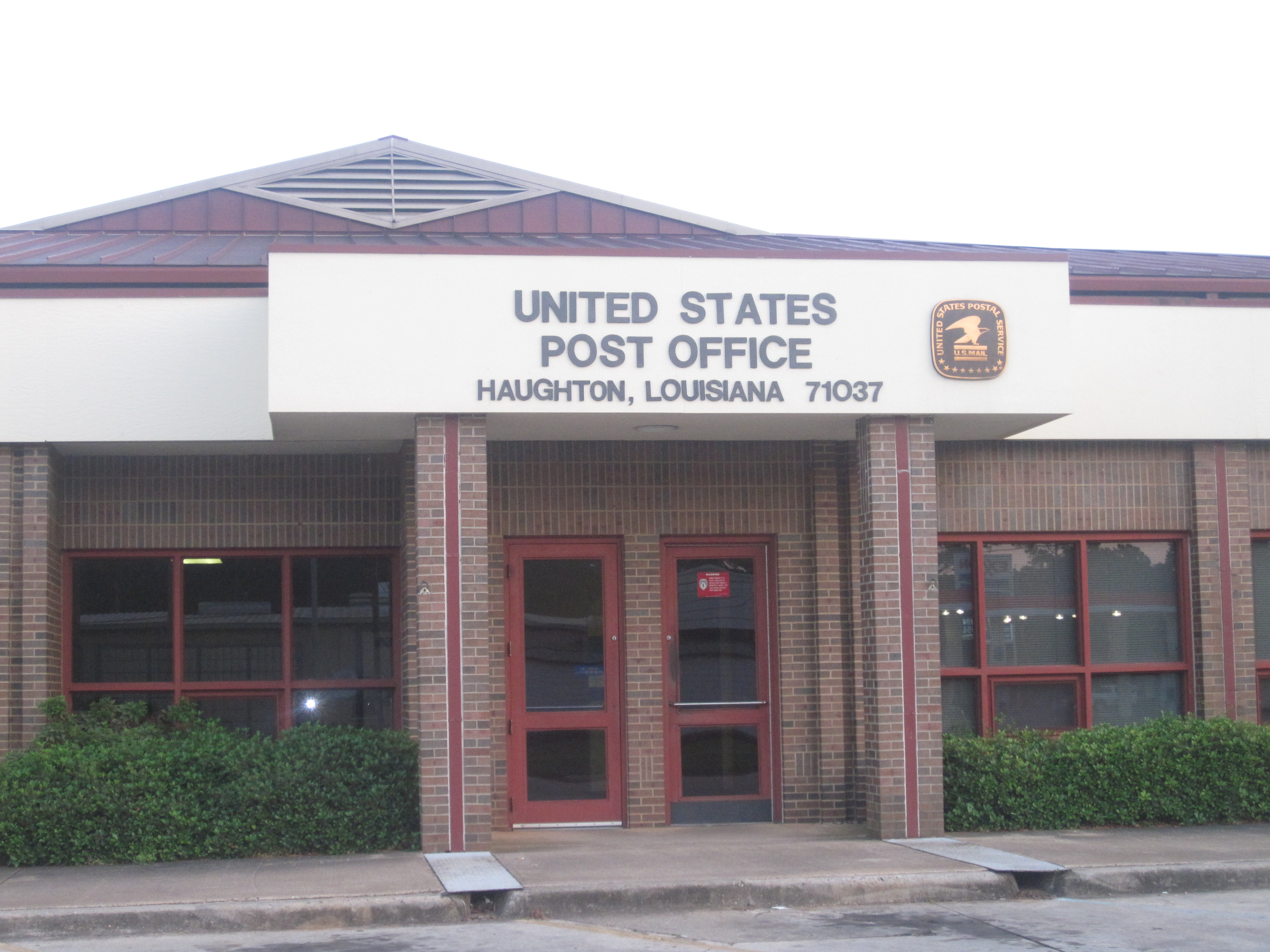
- The U.S. Post Office in Haughton

- Location of Haughton in Bossier Parish, Louisiana.

- Location of Louisiana in the United States
- Coordinates: 32°30′52″N 93°29′58″W
- Country: United States
- State: Louisiana
- Parish: Bossier

Area
  - Total: 5.72 sq mi (14.82 km^{2})
  - Land: 5.72 sq mi (14.82 km^{2})
  - Water: 0 sq mi (0.00 km^{2})
- Elevation: 230 ft (70 m)

Population (2020)
  - Total: 4,539
  - Rank: BO: 2nd
  - Density: 793.2/sq mi (306.27/km^{2})
- Time zone: UTC-6 (CST)
  - Summer (DST): UTC-5 (CDT)
- ZIP code: 71037
- Area code: 318
- FIPS code: 22-33420
- GNIS feature ID: 2405802
- Website: haughtonla.gov

Haughton is a town in Bossier Parish, Louisiana, United States. The population was 4,539 in 2020. It is part of the Shreveport-Bossier City metropolitan area.

== Geography ==
Haughton is located 15 miles (24 km) east of Bossier City and 17 miles (27 km) east of Shreveport. Interstate 20 touches the northwestern corner of the town, with access from Exit 33 (Elm Street).

According to the United States Census Bureau, the town has a total area of 5.3 square miles (13.6 km^{2}), all land.

=== Climate ===
The climate in this area is characterized by hot, humid summers and generally mild to cool winters. According to the Köppen Climate Classification system, Haughton has a humid subtropical climate, abbreviated "Cfa" on climate maps.

== Demographics ==
Historical population
Census	Pop.	Note	%±
1890	305		—
1900	194		−36.4%
1910	249		28.4%
1940	409		—
1950	501		22.5%
1960	611		22.0%
1970	885		44.8%
1980	1,510		70.6%
1990	1,664		10.2%
2000	2,792		67.8%
2010	3,454		23.7%
2020	4,539		31.4%
2025 (est.)	4,828	▲	6.4%
U.S. Decennial Census

Haughton racial composition as of 2020
Race	Number	Percentage
White (non-Hispanic)	3,146	69.31%
Black or African American (non-Hispanic)	829	18.26%
Native American	27	0.59%
Asian	24	0.53%
Pacific Islander	1	0.02%
Other/Mixed	301	6.63%
Hispanic or Latino	211	4.65%

As of the 2020 United States census, there were 4,539 people, 1,139 households, and 891 families residing in the town.

== Education ==
The community is in the Bossier Parish School District.

Most of Haughton is zoned to Haughton Elementary School. A portion of Haughton does not include, but is considered it, contains the collective boundary of T. L. Rodes Elementary School (Pre-Kindergarten-Grade 1), Platt Elementary School (grades 2-3), and Princeton Elementary School (grades 4-5). All residents are assigned to Haughton Middle School and Haughton High School.

== Media ==
KBTT is a radio station in Haughton.

== Notable people ==
- Myron Baker, linebacker for the Chicago Bears from 1993 to 1995.
- Joe Delaney, NFL player for the Kansas City Chiefs
- E. S. Dortch, planter and politician; veteran of the Confederate States Army
- John A. Franks, thoroughbred racehorse breeder
- Dak Prescott, professional football player
