= Bossier Parish Community College =

Public college in Bossier City, Louisiana, US

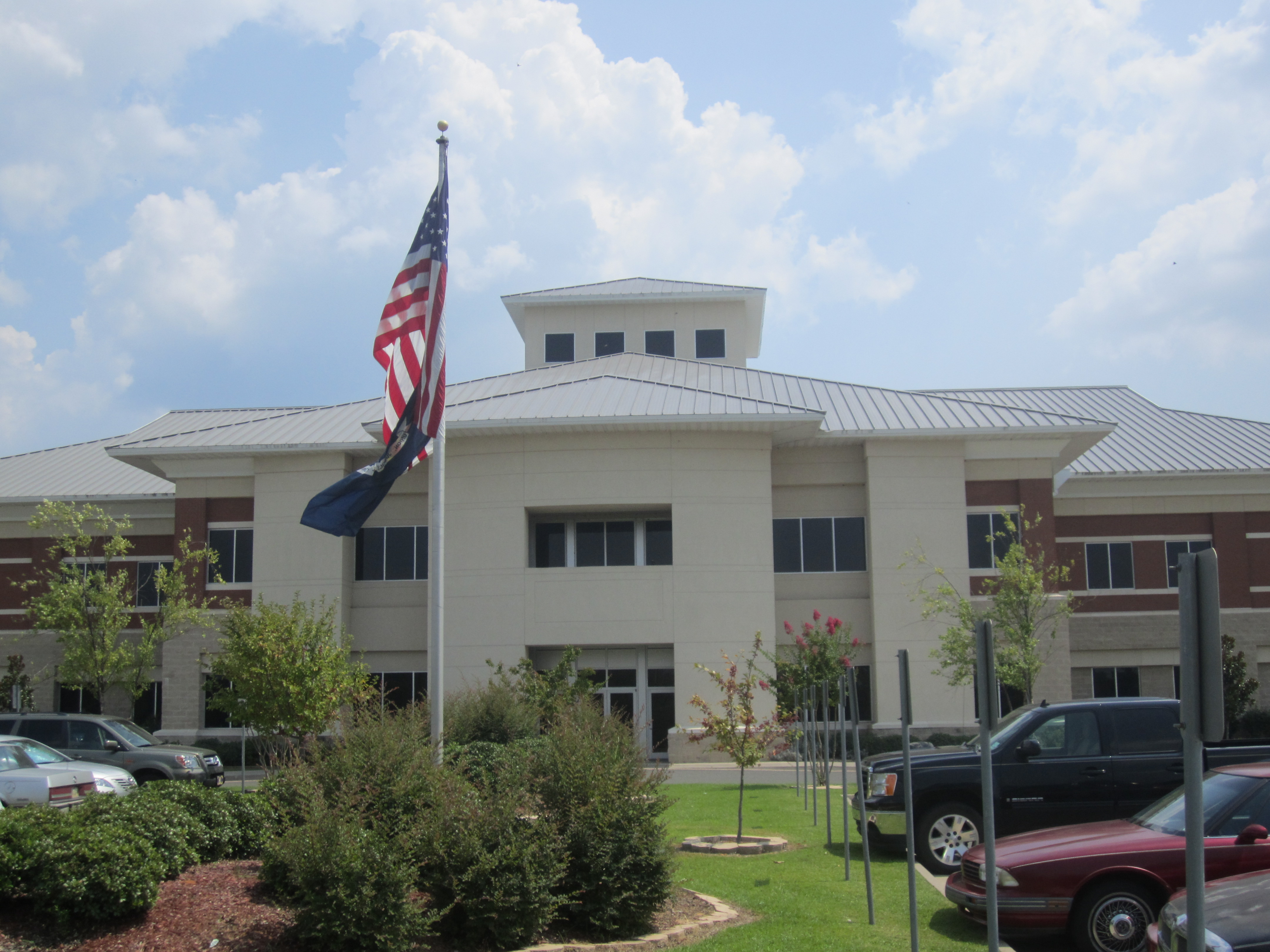
- Type: Public community college
- Established: 1967
- Chancellor: Rick Bateman
- Location: Bossier City, Louisiana, United States
- Colors: Maroon, Gold, and White
- Mascot: Cavalier
- Website: www.bpcc.edu

Bossier Parish Community College (BPCC) is a public community college located in Bossier City, Louisiana, United States. Established in 1967, BPCC was established by the Louisiana legislature in 1966 and began classes in 1967. Their current main campus, located on HWY 80, was built in 2004.
